= Cultural impact of Whitney Houston =

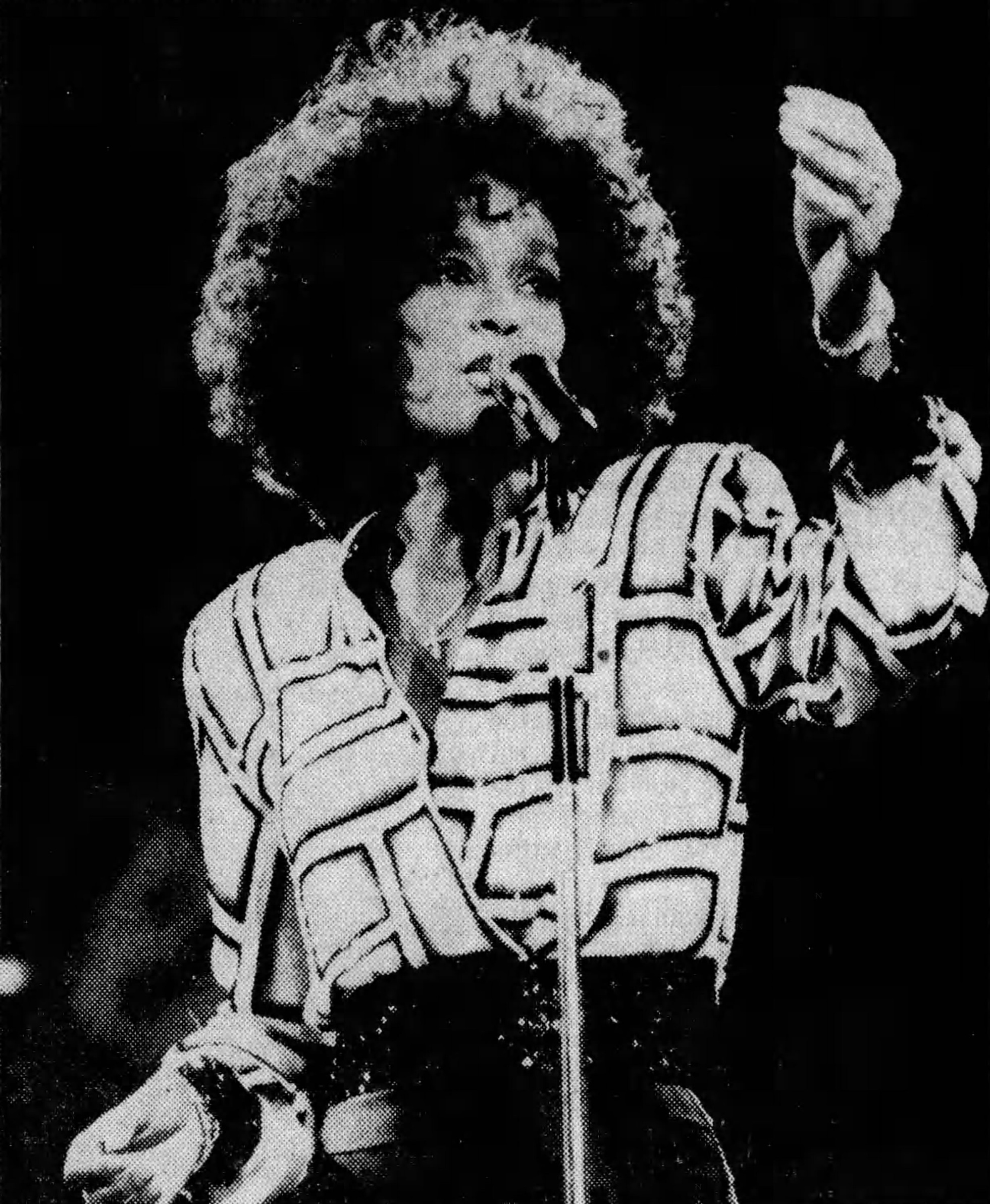
Whitney Houston during her heyday in August, 1987. She had just released her first two albums, Whitney Houston (1985) and Whitney (1987), both of them topped the Billboard 200 and are among the all time album best-sellers.

American singer and actress Whitney Houston (1963–2012) is widely regarded as one of the most culturally significant figures of the 20th century. She is recognized for her music and Hollywood crossover that influenced the breaking down of gender and racial barriers. As one of the best-selling and most awarded performers in history, Houston's career has been influential to the entertainment industry and popular culture. Known as ''The Voice", she was named the greatest woman in music by ABC and the second-greatest singer of all time by Rolling Stone. In 2025, Forbes named Houston the top black female vocalist, the number one female singer of the 80s and third of the 90s. Publications including the Rock and Roll Hall of Fame, Fox News, and NBC News dubbed Houston the “greatest singer of her generation”.

Houston has had an impact on breaking racial barriers for African Americans in the entertainment industry. She is also a gay icon and had an impact on politics. Her popularity and achievements has been compared to that of cultural icons Michael Jackson, Elvis Presley, the Beatles, and Judy Garland.

Houston has the most consecutive US number-one singles, the best-selling album of all time by a woman, best-selling single of the 1980s by a woman, best-selling debut album by a solo artist, best-selling R&B album by a woman, best selling gospel album and best-selling single by a woman. Her first two albums, Whitney Houston (1985) and Whitney (1987), along with The Bodyguard soundtrack (1992), rank among the best-selling albums of all time and made her the first black artist to score three RIAA diamond-certified albums. Her second album Whitney (1987) was the first album by an artist to debut at number one on the Billboard 200 and UK Albums Chart. "I Wanna Dance with Somebody (Who Loves Me)" and "I Will Always Love You" are among the best-selling singles of all time, with the former being named the best pop song ever by Billboard.

Houston worked in nine feature films, three television films, and seven television episodes, and appeared in seventeen commercials. She made her screen acting debut in the romantic thriller film The Bodyguard (1992) which was one of the 10 highest-grossing films worldwide at the time, making $411 million worldwide. Houston continued starring roles in Waiting to Exhale (1995), The Preacher's Wife (1996) and Cinderella (1997). As a film producer, she produced film series such as The Princess Diaries and The Cheetah Girls and multicultural movies Cinderella and Sparkle (2012). As a teen model, she was one of the first black women to appear on the cover of Seventeen magazine.

She has been inducted into multiple halls and walks of fame, including the Grammy Hall of Fame (twice), the Rock and Roll Hall of Fame in her first nomination, the National Rhythm and Blues Hall of Fame, the Georgia Music Hall of Fame, the New Jersey Hall of Fame, and the National Recording Registry at the Library of Congress. Houston won two Emmy Awards, five World Music Awards, nine Grammy Awards (including two Grammy Hall of Fame inductions and the Grammy Lifetime Achievement Award), 16 Billboard Music Awards (36 Billboard awards in all), 22 American Music Awards, and 33 Guinness World Records. The Guinness World Records named Houston the highest-earning posthumous female celebrity. Her life has been the subject of several documentaries and biopics.

== Fame and stardom ==
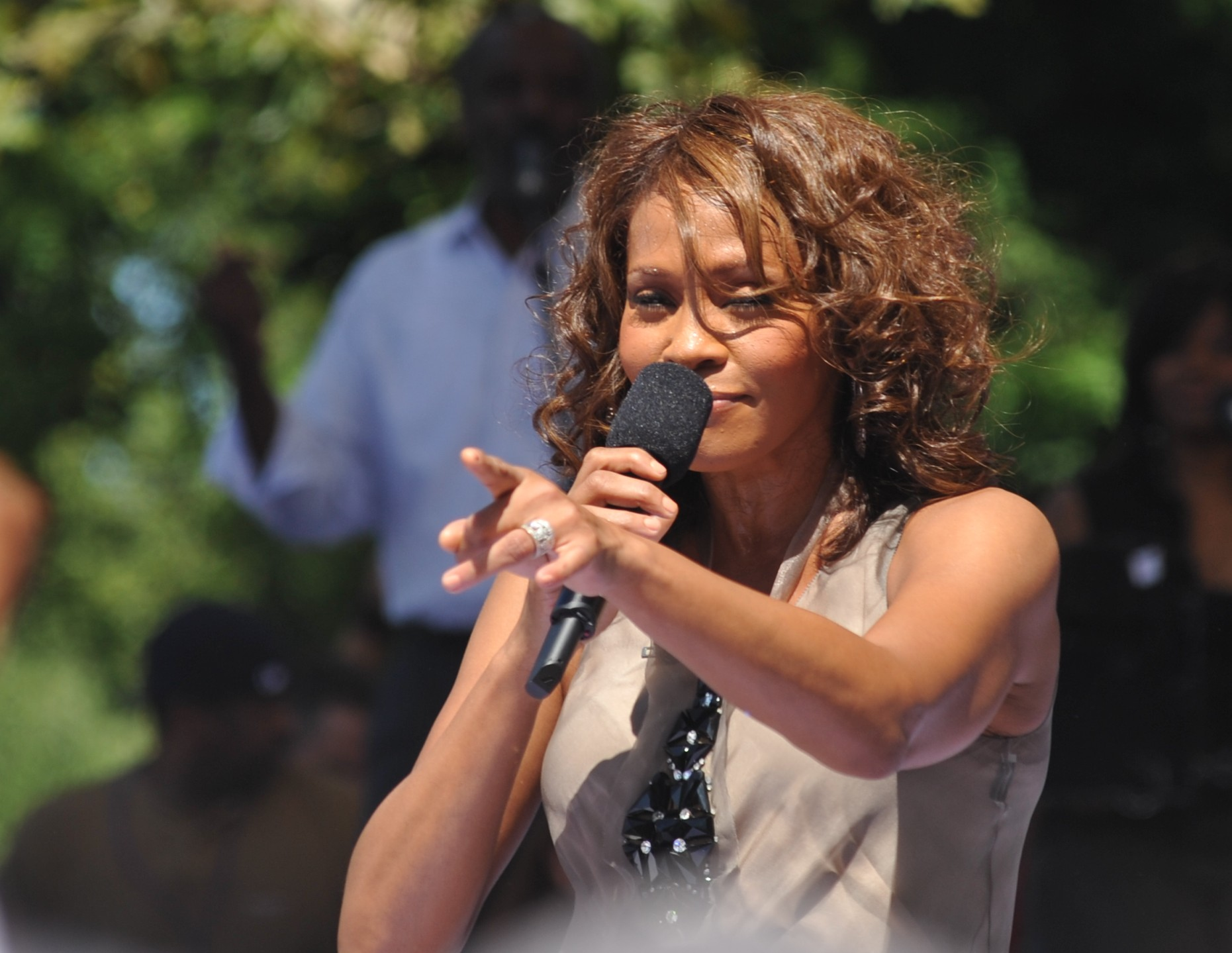
Houston in 2009.

Houston achieved success across multiple fields of entertainment, especially in music, movies, television, and modeling. She is the black female artist with the most Guinness World Records in history with 34. In 1997, the Franklin School in East Orange, New Jersey, which Houston attended as a child, was renamed to the Whitney E. Houston Academy of Creative & Performing Arts. Madame Tussauds unveiled four wax figures of Houston in 2013, inspired by her looks from the music video of I Wanna Dance with Somebody (Who Loves Me), film The Bodyguard, album cover of I Will Always Love You: The Best of Whitney Houston and The Star-Spangled Banner performance at the 1991 Super Bowl, marking the first time in its over 200-year history to happen to a celebrity. She held an honorary Doctorate in Humanities from Grambling State University, Louisiana.

According to J. Randy Taraborrelli, by 1995, Houston had "become something more than a star or even a superstar. She's a phenomenon, a force, an international icon so famous she can be identified almost anywhere by her first name alone. She belongs to that exclusive VIP one-name club, those people for whom no additional identification is required: Cher, Liza, Elvis, Roseanne, and Michael." In 2023, writer Laura Finley named Houston as one of the 300 women who have significantly contributed to American popular culture in her book titled Women in Popular Culture. Author Gerrick Kennedy wrote in his 2022 book about Houston, Didn't We Almost Have It All: In Defense of Whitney Houston, that "it took just four songs to make her the preeminent voice of a generation. Think about that. Not four albums. Songs. 'Saving All My Love for You'. 'How Will I Know'. 'Greatest Love of All'. 'I Wanna Dance with Somebody (Who Loves Me)'. When counted together, it's not even twenty minutes of her vocal instrument on display. Just four songs and Whitney Houston became the Queen of Pop —the Voice."

Houston was ranked among the greatest women in music by VH1 and as one of the greatest voices of the last twenty-two years in a 2003 MTV2 online poll. MTV Australia ranked Houston at first place among the top 10 musical divas of all time in 2013. Early in her career, Houston's success with her landmark self-titled debut album was so massive that a journalist from the New York Times called her "pop's new queen". In their Houston obituary, The Advocate referred to Houston as "the mother of pop". In one of his write-ups on Houston, Brian Boone of Grunge called Houston "America's inscrutable queen of pop".

=== Honorifics ===
Houston received the Howie Richmond Hitmaker Award at the Songwriters Hall of Fame in 1990, resulting in the first Hall of Fame honor Houston received in her career due to her impact on songwriters. In 1994, Houston received the Award of Merit at the American Music Awards. Fifteen years later, Houston received the American Music Award for International Artist Award for Excellence. A premier black female entertainer, Houston was honored by many black music award establishments, including inductions into the Soul Train Hall of Fame and the BET Walk of Fame in 1995 and 1996. In 1994, she received the Sammy Davis Jr. Entertainer of the Year honor at the 8th annual Soul Train Music Awards. Four years after that in 1998, Houston was the first recipient of the newly named Quincy Jones Award for Career Achievement (formerly the Heritage Award for Career Achievement), followed by the Female Artist of the Decade for Extraordinary Achievements in 2000. In 2001, Houston became the first recipient of the BET Lifetime Achievement Award at the first annual BET Awards. Nine years later, she received the BET Honors Award for her career in entertainment. In 1994, Houston received the Legend Award at the World Music Awards.

In 2016, Houston's musical legacy was honored at the National Museum of African American History and Culture at the Smithsonian Institution in Washington, D.C., with several artifacts of Houston donated from her estate being displayed in its Musical Crossroads gallery. Among the items of Houston displayed there include the Oscar de la Renta purple gown she wore during her performance at the Americana Festival during Liberty Weekend in 1986, the Diane von Fürstenberg red gown Houston wore during her appearance at the 1993 Billboard Music Awards, several of her awards including a Soul Train Music Award, an NAACP Image Award and an American Music Award and a green military flight jump suit Houston wore in 1991 while preparing for her Welcome Home Heroes with Whitney Houston concert. In 2019, several more of her artifacts were displayed at the National Museum of African American Music in Nashville, Tennessee.

Following her death in 2012, Houston was posthumously awarded the Billboard Millennium Award at the Billboard Music Awards, inducted into the Echo Music Awards Hall of Fame in Germany, and was the first female and black artist to be awarded the Global Icon award at the MTV Europe Music Awards. In 2013, Houston was inducted into both the New Jersey Hall of Fame and Georgia Music Hall of Fame. In August 2014, she was inducted into the National Rhythm and Blues Hall of Fame in its second class. In 2020, she was inducted into the Rock and Roll Hall of Fame after her first ballot. In addition, her music has also been rewarded with honors with her debut album, Whitney Houston, and her iconic rendition of "I Will Always Love You", being inducted into the Grammy Hall of Fame in 2013 and 2018 respectively. The latter song was included in the list of the Songs of the Century by the Recording Industry Association of America and the National Endowment of the Arts. In 2019, the same song was inducted into the National Recording Registry for being "culturally, historically, or aesthetically significant". Houston received the Grammy Lifetime Achievement Award in 2026.

== Artistry ==
=== Musicianship and voice ===
Houston's music encompassed a broad range of genres, including R&B, pop, rock, soul, gospel, funk, dance, Latin pop, disco, house, hip hop soul, new jack swing, opera, reggae, and Christmas. Among the lyrical themes explored in her music included romance, relationships, infidelity, religion, tabloid media and feminism.

The Rock and Roll Hall of Fame stated: "Her sound expanded through collaborations with a wide array of artists, including Stevie Wonder, Luther Vandross, Babyface, Missy Elliott, Bobby Brown, and Mariah Carey." AllMusic commented that, "Houston was able to handle big adult contemporary ballads, effervescent, stylish dance-pop and slick urban contemporary soul with equal dexterity".

Houston was considered a trendsetter in pop balladry, with Richard Rischar stating "the black pop ballad of the mid-1980s had been dominated by the vocal and production style that was smooth and polished, led by singers Whitney Houston, Janet Jackson, and James Ingram."

Houston's remix of her 1991 new jack swing hit, "My Name Is Not Susan", was credited later for "breaking new ground" in blending genres as it included female British rapper Monie Love in one of the earliest remixes involving a rapper on a song by a contemporary R&B/pop artist before the practice became commonplace.

During the early stages of Houston's career, some Black critics and audiences accused her voice and music of not sounding "Black enough". Steve Rose of The Guardian attributed this perception to her "syrupy ballads and perky dance-pop," along with music videos that featured a mix of both Black and white dancers. At the time, Houston had established herself as a mainstream pop star, with a musical style that differed from the soul and R&B genres often associated with Black artists. Due to her mixing pop, R&B and gospel music, Rolling Stone called her "the ultimate crossover artist".

Houston was also acclaimed for mixing older soul and pop with the cutting-edge sound of the contemporaries of her era. Houston's producer Narada Michael Walden told Rolling Stone in 2012, "Because of her cousin Dionne, she understood all those pretty-ass melodies from Burt Bacharach. But because she was young and from the era of Michael Jackson, Prince and Madonna, she had soul in her too – those rhythms. She had both sides. Plus, she was so damn gorgeous. You couldn’t say no to her."

Andrew Chan of Slant Magazine wrote "the way Whitney's image muffled her political significance made it easier for non-black singers to mimic her without being accused of cultural theft, and the following decade witnessed an accelerated de-racialization of African-American vocal tradition. The shift has been so complete that virtually every new female pop star expecting mass acclaim for her instrument must now be equipped with an arsenal of techniques that a few decades ago would have marked her as too 'soul', too 'urban', too black for the white audience".

Houston had a four-octave vocal range. Her voice has sometimes been described as either a soprano, spinto soprano or "mezzo-soprano". (Note: Following Houston's vocal changes in the mid-to-late 1990s, Houston's voice type was sometimes labeled a "dramatic mezzo-soprano" up until the end of her life, due to vocal maturity and lifestyle choices.) Andrew Chan said of Houston's timbre that it was "so clean that when she did sustain a note at the very top of her chest range (for instance, in the climactic moments of "I'm Every Woman"), there was none of that danger, that premonition of something about to snap, so integral to the drama of deep-soul testimony", comparing her vocal style of that of soul-oriented artists such as Aretha Franklin and Chaka Khan. Chan further stated that what made Houston "universally palpable" was "her knack for harnessing the intensity of Aretha while also letting the ear-caressing tones of quiet storm share the foreground." In his article on Houston during the singer's early career in 1987, Richard Corliss of Time magazine wrote that Houston's voice was "the supplest pipes in pop music." In another unrelated Time review, they wrote of Houston's voice, "if the human voice is a musical instrument, hers is a Stradivarius among ordinary violins."

=== Videography ===
Houston was one of the first recording artists to emerge in the MTV Generation during the 1980s with most of her music videos earning popularity on MTV. Houston’s music video, for the song "How Will I Know", released in December 1985, helped introduce the singer to a wider audience on MTV and established her as a cultural icon early in her career. It won the MTV Video Music Award for Best Female Video at the 1986 MTV Video Music Awards. The music video for "Greatest Love of All" helped cement the M.O. for the classic Whitney video.

Most of Houston's notable videos involve just a bit of perfunctory storyline and focus on her performance, however, several sources recognized her as one of the pioneers who laid the groundwork and broke down barriers with the videos during her generation. In addition, Houston has also been recognized for being one of the "most preeminent divas of the early music video age." In 2003, VH1 ranked Houston at number three on the list of '50 Greatest Women of the Video Era'. Gil Kaufman from MTV News said that "[Houston] proved you could make a fuss without making a spectacle."

In the 2023 book, Diva: Feminism and Fierceness from Pop to Hip-Hop, a chapter was dedicated to Houston's pioneering contributions on MTV. Writer Gwynne George stated most of Houston's early videos "allowed her to foreground her professionalism by repeatedly showcasing and insisting upon her artistic labour as a Black creative professional", further stating that Houston "incorporate[d] the idea of creative labour -- whether rehearsing with background singers, recording in the studio or performing onstage, her professionalism was repeatedly foreground."

George further wrote that Houston's performance in her music videos "cohered with emerging depictions of 'working girls' as a cultural archetype in Hollywood in the 1980s, wherein women were shown conspicuously moving into the workplace and enjoying their roles as professionals - thus allowing for certain forms of empowerment, albeit curtailed in the workplace." George drew comparisons of Houston's repeated stagings of rehearsals and recordings to that of some of Michael Jackson's music videos that showcased similar performance videos.

George stated Houston's 1980s-era videos in Reagan-era America "arguably combated contemporary controlling images of black women, imbuing her star brand with notions of hard work, discipline and technical proficiency at a charged sociopolitical moment. In this way, Houston's music videos can be read as Black feminist spaces -- using an insistence on her professionalism as a counterpunch to white supremacist discourses of the day."

== Influence on popular culture ==
=== Racial and gender barriers ===
==== Music ====
Houston is recognized as one of the most influential R&B artists in history and a cultural icon. ABC News described Houston as a "revolutionary artist who enchanted audiences with her iconic voice—and kicked down the door for Black artists who followed her." Julianne MacNeill of Woman's World magazine credited Houston with "single-handedly changing the world of pop and R&B music". CBS News recognized her as the "voice of the post-civil rights era". On what would've been Houston's 50th birthday in 2013, Mikael Wood of the Los Angeles Times hailed her as a "superstar vocalist whose hit tunes helped bridge the gap between pop and soul music".

During the 1980s, MTV was coming into its own and received criticism for not playing enough videos by black artists. With Michael Jackson breaking down the color barrier for black men, Houston did the same for black women. Although the video for her song "You Give Good Love" was initially restricted from airing on MTV because it sounded too black, she became the first black woman to receive heavy rotation on the network following the success of the "How Will I Know" video. According to author Ann Kaplan in her book Rocking Around the Clock: Television, Postmodernism and Consumer Culture, "until the recent advent of Whitney Houston, Tina Turner was the only female Black singer featured regularly, and even so, her videos are far and few between." Houston was only the second black female artist to win an MTV Video Music Award after Turner. Houston was credited for breaking barriers for black female artists on the channel resulting in videos by Janet Jackson, Jody Watley and Tracy Chapman to be immediately accepted to the channel's playlist.

Houston also broke barriers for black women getting airplay on pop radio. Black female artists, such as Anita Baker and Janet Jackson, were successful in popular music partly because Houston paved the way. Baker commented that "Because of what Whitney and Sade did, there was an opening for me ... For radio stations, black women singers aren't taboo anymore." According to Justin Kantor for the Seattle Post-Intelligencer, Houston's success on pop radio, starting with "You Give Good Love", "opened the floodgates for big-voiced female R&B singers in the 'crossover' market of the 1980's and '90s." The song's producer Kashif added in the same article, "[You Give Good Love] took my career to a whole new level and helped to cement my status as an elite producer. For that I am eternally grateful to Whitney." Kantor further stated that Houston "transformed the landscape of commercial R&B for further African-American songwriters and producers whose work had previously been overlooked by top-40 programmers," adding that the album's black collaborators – Narada Michael Walden, Preston Glass and LeMel Humes – benefited from working on the album. "Greatest Love of All", according to Kantor, "forever secure[d] [Houston's] prominent place in universal pop culture and the lives of countless millions... bec[oming] the soundtrack to graduations and celebrations of achievements everywhere."

In March 1986, Houston broke a six-year drought of black female number one albums on the Billboard 200 when Whitney Houston topped the chart on International Woman's Day, March 8 of that year. (Note: From January 12, 1980 to March 1, 1986, no black female artist had topped the Billboard 200, only going as high as number two.) The last black female artist to top the chart had been Donna Summer in early January 1980. Houston's breakthrough led to other black female artists to achieve similar success. On June 21, 1986, Janet Jackson's Control and Patti LaBelle's Winner in You joined Houston's debut into the top three of the Billboard 200, which set another historic milestone as it being the first time that black artists and female artists held the top three positions on what was then called the Top Pop Albums chart. Control and Winner in You subsequently followed Houston to number one on the Billboard 200 not too long after, another first. On their 1986 year-end Billboard Hot 100 list, it was reported that six songs by black artists – including Houston's "How Will I Know" – made it to the top ten of the list, the most since 1979, partially due to Houston's success.

Houston in particular became the first black woman—and just the second woman in its history—to be named the top pop artist on Billboard's year-end chart that year and was the first woman ever to have an album placed at number one on their top pop albums list. In addition, when "Greatest Love of All" and the Whitney Houston album simultaneously topped the Hot 100 and Billboard 200 on May 17, 1986, Houston had become the first female artist since Kim Carnes in June 1981 to do so.

AllMusic noted her contribution to the success of black artists on the pop scene. The New York Times stated that "Houston was a major catalyst for a movement within black music that recognized the continuity of soul, pop, jazz and gospel vocal traditions". Richard Corliss of Time magazine commented on her initial success breaking various barriers:

Of her first album's ten cuts, six were ballads. This chanteuse [Houston] had to fight for air play with hard rockers. The young lady had to stand uncowed in the locker room of macho rock. The soul strutter had to seduce a music audience that anointed few black artists with superstardom. ... She was a phenomenon waiting to happen, a canny tapping of the listener's yen for a return to the musical middle. And because every new star creates her own genre, her success has helped other blacks, other women, other smooth singers find an avid reception in the pop marketplace.

Houston has also been recognized for playing a pivotal role in crossing racial boundaries in the recording industry, where black artists were once considered to be substandard. Author Maureen Mahon states: "In the 1980s, Whitney Houston, Michael Jackson, Janet Jackson, and Prince were among the African American artists who crossed over ... When black artists cross over into pop success they cease to be black in the industry sense of the word. They get promoted from racialized black music to universal pop music in an economically driven process of racial transcendence."

==== Film ====
In film, Houston also broke racial barriers, starring with her debut starring role in the feature film, The Bodyguard. The film was notable for its successful portrayal of an interracial couple as Houston and co-star Kevin Costner's characters engaged in a brief romance in the film just months after the 1992 Los Angeles riots. In 2012, Jess Cagle of Entertainment Weekly explained, "It was interesting that 'The Bodyguard' also came out the year of the Rodney King riots, when tension between the races was very much in the news and very much a concern of everyone... then there was "The Bodyguard," it was an interracial romance. There was no discussion about it. It was a monster hit. People loved it. People loved those two stars. For anyone to say that there was a problem with the interracial romance made you look stupid. It made you look completely out of step with the rest of the culture." ABC News explained in 2012, "At the time, a black woman and a white man sharing such a tender moment together on the big screen sparked widespread discussion about interracial issues." The film was compared to films such as Guess Who's Coming to Dinner and similar films and said while films such as ...Dinner "made interracial love their pivotal plot points", The Bodyguard "seemed to blur race".

Her second film, Waiting to Exhale (1995), was notable for having an all-African-American cast, and was called by The Los Angeles Times a "social phenomenon". Waiting to Exhale was a financial success, grossing for a total worldwide of $81.45 million, proving that a film with an all-black female cast can become a blockbuster hit. According to Susan King of the Los Angeles Times, the film "showed the power of black actresses and led to other successful movies with ethnic casts." Among the films that immediately spawned afterwards included How Stella Got Her Groove Back, The Best Man and Diary of a Mad Black Woman. It also was notable for its portrayal of black women as strong middle class citizens rather than as stereotypes.

==== Impact ====
In a 2014 Mic.com article that celebrated Houston's contribution to contemporary R&B music, Houston was credited by Natalie Morin with paving the way for the multifaceted careers of Beyoncé and Nicki Minaj for being "able to transition so smoothly between music, modeling and acting". Morin further wrote, "Houston proved that female musicians (and more specifically, black female musicians) could be triple or even quadruple threats. Now that's a given for modern musicians." In the same article, Morin credited Houston's "perfection of a 'fierce' and 'strong' image" as her "most consciously imitated quality", comparing it to Beyoncé's "Queen Bey" persona and Minaj's "half-comical, half-feared 'Barbie/Roman'" image and cites it as the reason for singers such as Ariana Grande to "[sing] about how they don't need a man to feel fulfilled. Houston was the iconic strong, independent woman that was a rare find in the public eye."

Essence ranked Houston at number five on their list of 50 Most Influential R&B Stars ever, calling her "the diva to end all divas". In October 2022, the same magazine ranked Houston at number one on its list of the 10 greatest R&B solo artists of all time. In 2015, she was placed at number nine (making her the second-highest-ranking woman) by Billboard on the list "35 Greatest R&B Artists Of All Time"; ten years later, in its list of the "75 Best R&B Artists Of All Time", Houston moved up to fifth place. According to the Official Charts Company, Houston "managed to straddle both the worlds of commercial pop and R&B, breaking down barriers for Black women in pop music and opening the doors for future superstars like Mariah Carey and Beyoncé." In 2025, Forbes named Houston the top black female vocalist.

=== As a gay icon ===
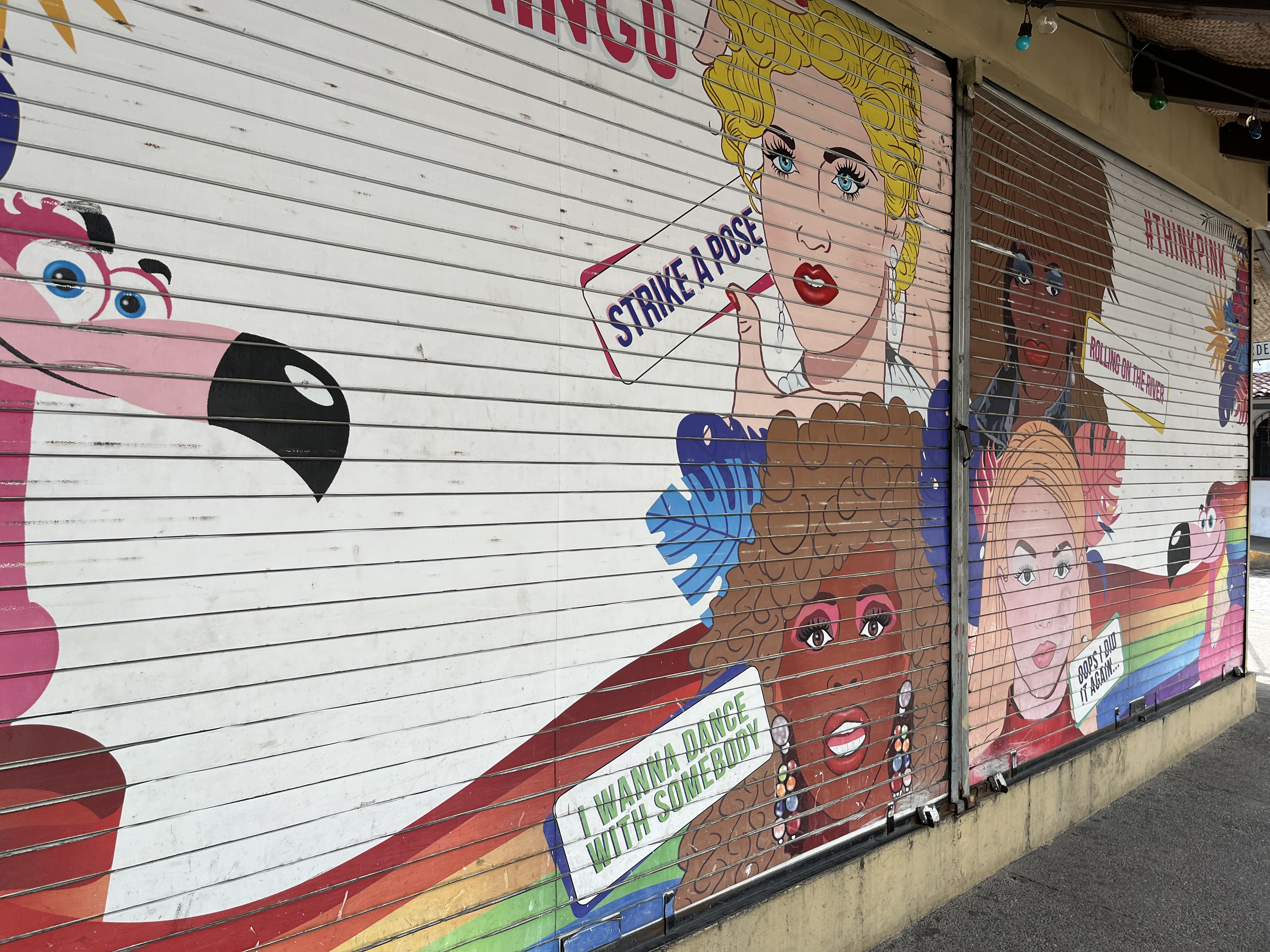
A Pride mural featuring Houston and other gay icons is shown in Puerto Vallarta.

In the early 1980s, Houston was in a same-sex relationship with Robyn Crawford. In 1986, the LGBT magazine publication The Advocate reported that one of Houston's concerts at the Boston Common in Boston raised $30,000 for the AIDS Action Committee of Massachusetts and the Gay and Lesbian Counseling Service. Since then Houston became an activist for the fight against HIV and AIDS during the first decade of the AIDS epidemic. The Whitney Houston Foundation for Children, in particular, focused on helping children who suffered from HIV/AIDS, among other issues. In 1990, Whitney took part in Arista Records' 15th anniversary gala, which was an AIDS benefit, where she sang "I Wanna Dance with Somebody (Who Loves Me)", "Greatest Love of All" and, with cousin Dionne Warwick, "That's What Friends Are For". A year later, Whitney participated in the Reach Out & Touch Someone AIDS vigil at London in September 1991 while she was finishing her historic ten-date residency at London's Wembley Arena; there, she stressed the importance of AIDS research and addressing HIV stigma.

In June 1999, Whitney gave a surprise performance at the 13th Annual New York City Lesbian & Gay Pride Dance at one of the city's West Side piers. According to Instinct magazine, Houston's unannounced performance at the Piers "ushered in a new era that would eventually make high-profile artists performing at LGBTQ events virtually commonplace". Before hitting the stage, Houston was asked by MTV veejay John Norris why she decided to attend the event. Houston replied, "We're all God's children, honey". In May 2000, Houston made the cover of Out magazine.

In the same year of her Out interview, Houston released her first greatest hits compilation, Whitney: The Greatest Hits, which was released as a two-CD set. While Disc One, titled "Cool Down", was a selection of her love ballads, Disc Two, titled "Throw Down", featured mostly house and club remixes primarily aimed at her gay audience as a substitution of her uptempo hits, which was hailed at the time as a "bold move", that helped "repositioned Houston in the marketplace alongside emerging dancefloor divas of the day J-Lo & Britney." In its review of The Greatest Hits, the New York Daily News remarked "In her dance mixes, she exudes an erotic dynamism that no one else has the lung power to match. This isn't just an ecstatic piece of party music – it utterly redefines Houston as an artist."

In his book, Gay Icons: The (Mostly) Female Entertainers Gay Men Love (2018), French academic Georges-Claude Guilbert wrote, "I do not think that anyone would dispute Houston’s gay iconicity... She was beautiful, she was black, she was fierce (sometimes), she sang dance music." Said Gerrick Kennedy in 2022 to CNN: "She was really the first one to do those big house remixes in a way we weren’t really seeing from Black girls. There was an element of performance in a space where queer people, especially Black queer people, were able to find freedom and liberation. That’s our connection with diva figures – how they make us feel, and it’s usually rooted in some form of liberation." Kennedy noted the release of Houston's critically acclaimed 1998 album, My Love Is Your Love, as "the moment when I, a Black queer boy growing up in the Midwest, which was super oppressive, felt free."

During her Billboard interview promoting her album, Born This Way, Lady Gaga referenced Houston alongside other female icons of the 1990s era, including Madonna, TLC and En Vogue as female artists who "were making very empowering music for women and the gay community and all kind of disenfranchised communities, the lyrics and the melodies were very poignant and very gospel and very spiritual", using them as influence into the creation of her hit of the same name. At the 2011 Grammy Awards, while accepting the Grammy for Best Pop Vocal Album for her 2009 EP, The Fame Monster, Gaga directly thanked Houston for inspiring "Born This Way".

Like most of her peers and contemporaries, Houston has become imitated and portrayed by drag queens over the years. Several drag performers such as Morgan McMichaels, Moltyn Decadence, Mimi Imfurst, Cherry Pop and Brenda Dahling have all imitated Houston's onstage mannerisms, wardrobe and performance style. Houston's "Queen of the Night" attire was also emulated by drag queens.

Popular drag queen performer Trinity K. Bonet has often impersonated Houston during her performances. Bonet appeared as Houston for an opening sketch of an Ellen episode in June 2019.

In 2017, drag queen Sasha Velour attracted national attention from her lip sync to Houston's "So Emotional" on season nine of RuPaul's Drag Race, where she unveiled a bed of roses falling out of her wig, with The A.V. Club naming it “performance of the year” while Entertainment Weekly listed it in their "TV's Best Musical Moments" list.

In 2022, Velour explained that her performance of the song was her way of [capturing] the feeling of isolation, among other things, telling them "I saw the rose petals as a kind of iconography or metaphor... Loneliness, heartache, love, loss, grieving – I can hear different colors of all of that in ‘So Emotional.’ I wanted to take something broad like that, and just show how it builds and builds as her (Houston’s) performance gets more intense." Houston is one of the most popular artists to be covered in the lip sync battle portion of Drag Race alongside other divas such as Cher, Aretha Franklin, Beyoncé, Lady Gaga, Britney Spears and Janet Jackson.

In 2025, openly pansexual and non-binary deejay Felix Jaehn remixed Houston's iconic 1999 hit, "It's Not Right but It's Okay", which reached several charts in Europe and topped the charts in the Czech Republic. That same year, openly gay singer Calum Scott released a reimagined symphonic duet ballad rendition of Houston's iconic 1987 hit, "I Wanna Dance with Somebody (Who Loves Me)", which reached the UK charts. In addition, gay singers Claybourne Elder, Matt Alber, Scott Matthew, Ty Herndon and Aiden James have covered "I Wanna Dance with Somebody".

Many of her songs are considered gay anthems, including "Saving All My Love for You", "How Will I Know", "Love Will Save the Day", "My Love Is Your Love", "I Have Nothing", "Where Do Broken Hearts Go", "Run to You", "So Emotional", "I Wanna Dance With Somebody", and "It's Not Right but It's Okay". "It's Not Right but It's Okay", in particular, has made several best-of lists in LGBTQ and dance music categories and in 2018, Billboard cited the song as the "gay national anthem".

=== Public image and perception ===
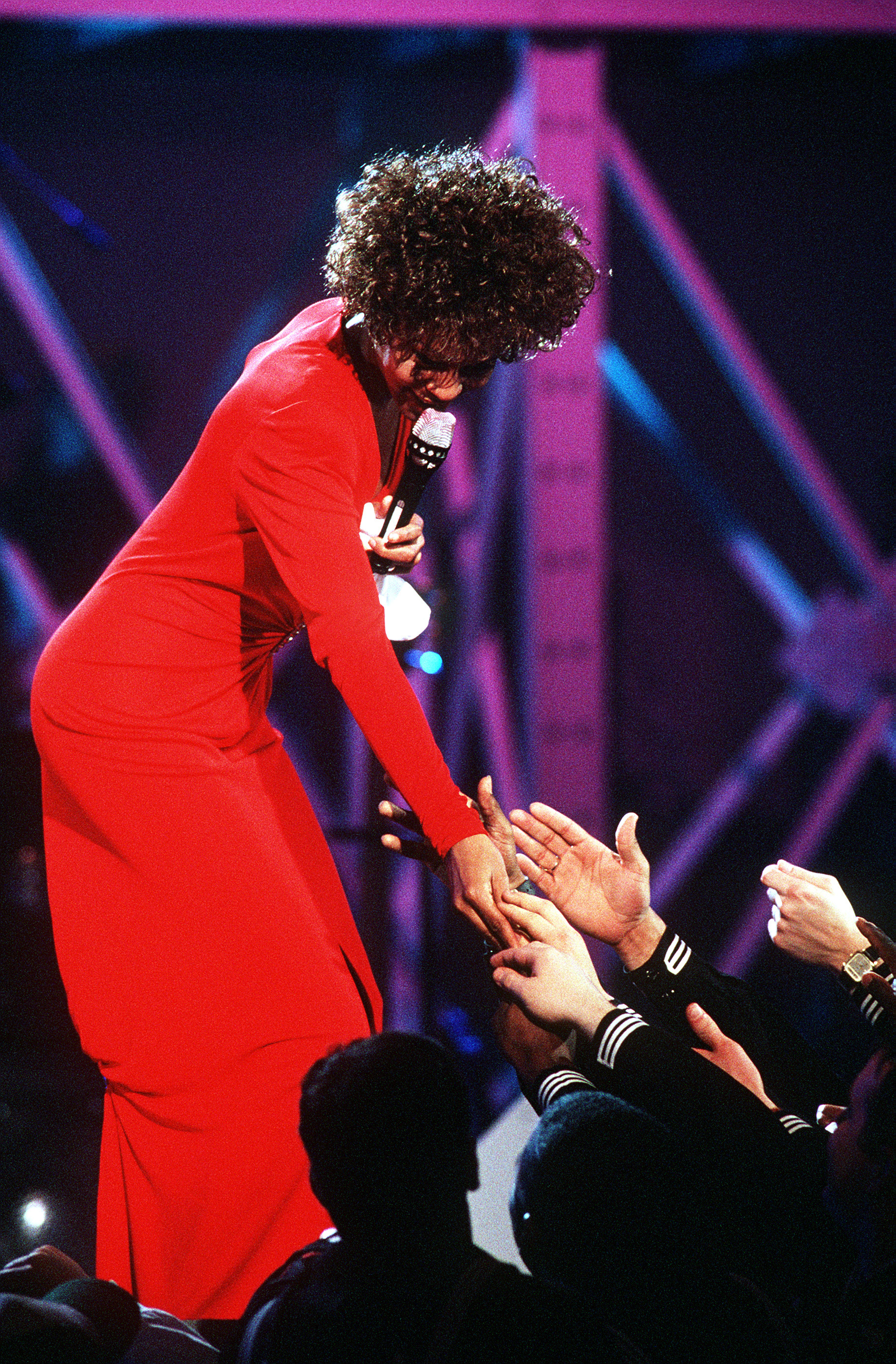
Houston greeting soldiers returning from the Persian Gulf War during her Welcome Home Heroes show, 1991.

Pop culture critics stated that in the past, very few people of color were widely embraced as "America's Sweetheart", until Houston's arrival in the mid-1980s and even then, the singer was considered a rare exception in a category often dominated by white women. According to music journalist Gerrick Kennedy, the nation had not yet "collectively christened a Black girl as America's Sweetheart" prior to Houston. Beginning with her breakthrough during the 1980s, Houston cultivated a wholesome image that was marketed as "America's Sweetheart" by both the media and her management. Journalists such as Janice Min and Bim Adewunmi called her "the first black America's sweetheart". Film director Kevin Macdonald said Houston cemented her status as "America's Sweetheart" when she performed "The Star Spangled Banner" at Super Bowl XXV, becoming "this symbol of everything that was pure and sweet and lovely about America at that time".

According to Constance Grady of Vox, Houston represented "a kind of Americana to which Black women are not usually allowed access" that simultaneously made her palatable to white audiences but dismissible by some Black critics, who at times accused her of selling out. In the mid-1990s, the singer traded her "America's Sweetheart" image in exchange for championing Black culture and art. Houston's reputation soured in the early 2000s when her drug addiction and troubled marriage to singer Bobby Brown became highly publicized and parodied by the media. Grady theorized that Houston "was allowed to be America's Black sweetheart, but only if she followed the rules laid out by white America". Kennedy said that, for much of her career, Houston hid her personal struggles in order to be accepted as "America's Sweetheart", until the public ultimately ran out of patience with her.

Still however, A. Curtis Farrow, a music promoter from Houston's hometown of Newark, New Jersey and the founder of McDonald's Gospelfest told the Asbury Park Press in 2020 following news of Houston's induction into the Rock and Roll Hall of Fame that "[Houston] never really stopped being 'America's sweetheart', ... To this day, when you talk about national anthems at the Super Bowl, everyone talks about hers first." Farrow further added that Houston's Rock Hall induction was "America saying 'You know what? The voice, America's sweetheart Whitney Houston, is ours.'" Folk rock singer and guitarist Matt Nathanson's 2024 song "Whitney Houston's National Anthem", a duet with The Indigo Girls, off his album, King of (Un)Simple, references her Super Bowl XXV performance and uses the "America's Sweetheart" moniker to depict her.

== Impact on vocal style ==
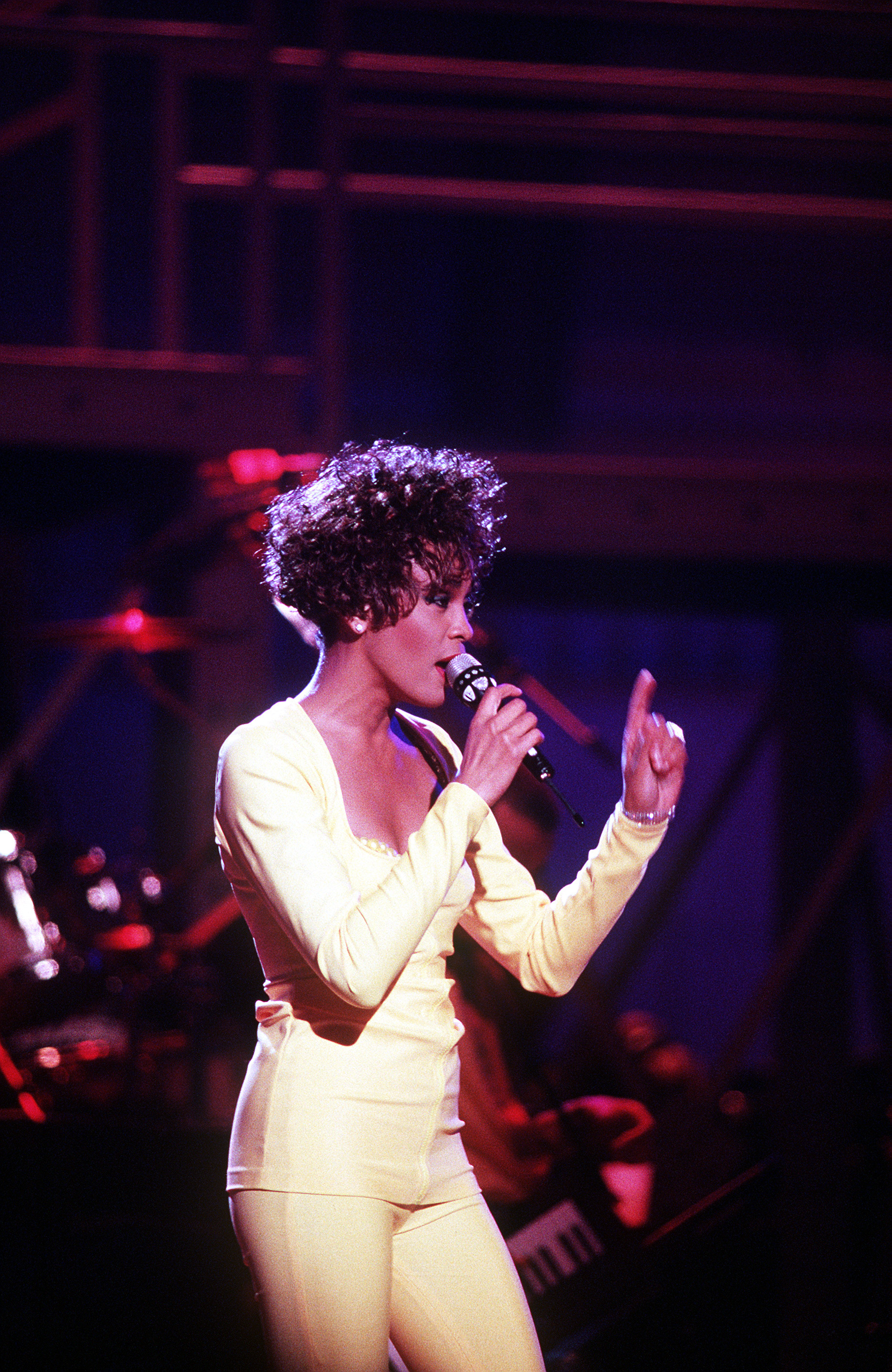
Houston performing "Saving All My Love for You" at the Welcome Home Heroes with Whitney Houston concert in 1991.

Houston has been nicknamed "The Voice" and is regarded as one of the greatest vocalists of all time. Stephen Holden of The New York Times said that Houston "revitalized the tradition of strong gospel-oriented pop-soul singing". Ann Powers of the Los Angeles Times referred to Houston as a "national treasure". Jon Caramanica, another music critic of The New York Times, called Houston "R&B's great modernizer", adding "slowly but surely reconciling the ambition and praise of the church with the movements and needs of the body and the glow of the mainstream". He also drew comparisons between Houston's influence and other big names on 1980s pop:

She was, alongside Michael Jackson and Madonna, one of the crucial figures to hybridize pop in the 1980s, though her strategy was far less radical than that of her peers. Jackson and Madonna were by turns lascivious and brutish and, crucially, willing to let their production speak more loudly than their voices, an option Ms. Houston never went for. Also, she was less prolific than either of them, achieving most of her renown on the strength of her first three solo albums and one soundtrack, released from 1985 to 1992. If she was less influential than they were in the years since, it was only because her gift was so rare, so impossible to mimic. Jackson and Madonna built worldviews around their voices; Ms. Houston's voice was the worldview. She was someone more to be admired, like a museum piece, than to be emulated.

The Independent's music critic Andy Gill also wrote about Houston's influence on modern R&B and singing competitions, comparing it to Michael Jackson's. "Because Whitney, more than any other single artist – Michael Jackson included – effectively mapped out the course of modern R&B, setting the bar for standards of soul vocalese and creating the original template for what we now routinely refer to as the 'soul diva'", stated Gill. "Jackson was a hugely talented icon, certainly, but he will be as well remembered (probably more so) for his presentational skills, his dazzling dance moves, as for his musical innovations. Whitney, on the other hand, just sang and the ripples from her voice continue to dominate the pop landscape." Gill said that there "are few, if any, Jackson imitators on today's TV talent shows, but every other contestant is a Whitney wannabe, desperately attempting to emulate that wondrous combination of vocal effects – the flowing melisma, the soaring mezzo-soprano confidence, the tremulous fluttering that carried the ends of lines into realms of higher yearning".

Houston's vocal stylings have had a significant impact on the music industry. Stephen Holden from The New York Times, in his review of Houston's Radio City Music Hall concert on July 20, 1993, praised her attitude as a singer, writing, "Whitney Houston is one of the few contemporary pop stars of whom it might be said: the voice suffices. While almost every performer whose albums sell in the millions calls upon an entertainer's bag of tricks, from telling jokes to dancing to circus pyrotechnics, Ms. Houston would rather just stand there and sing." With regard to her singing style, he added: "Her [Houston's] stylistic trademarks – shivery melismas that ripple up in the middle of a song, twirling embellishments at the ends of phrases that suggest an almost breathless exhilaration – infuse her interpretations with flashes of musical and emotional lightning."

In the list of "15 Grammy Winners Who Changed Music Forever" from the website, The Scroller, Houston was included with Dana Aliaga writing that her "Grammy-winning voice became the benchmark for modern vocal performance, influencing generations of singers across pop and R&B", adding that her "ability to combine technical perfection with emotional force reshaped expectations for what a lead vocalist could do, both on record and on stage" and that "her sound defined an era and turned vocal excellence into a cultural obsession."

Houston was credited with popularizing melisma during the 1980s and 1990s. Though other artists such as Aretha Franklin, Stevie Wonder and Ray Charles had used the technique prior, vocal coach Steve Sweetland explained that what set Houston apart was that with her, it "was an attitude more than anything else. She truly believed in the artistic value of the melisma. Whereas the others were perhaps simply going along with the trends, she embodied that; she made it part of herself." Gerrick Kennedy stated: "Melismatic singing the way we heard it from Whitney is most responsible for shaping the central thesis of contemporary pop. It's a style that inspired Mariah Carey and Adele and Beyoncé and Ariana Grande, and countless American Idol and Voice contestants have tried to mimic it."

Lauren Everitt from BBC News commented on the melisma used in Houston's recording. "An early 'I' in Whitney Houston's 'I Will Always Love You' takes nearly six seconds to sing. In those seconds the former gospel singer-turned-pop star packs a series of different notes into the single syllable", stated Everitt. "The technique is repeated throughout the song, most pronouncedly on every 'I' and 'you'. The vocal technique is called melisma and it has inspired a host of imitators. Other artists may have used it before Houston, but it was her rendition of Dolly Parton's love song that pushed the technique into the mainstream in the 90s. ... But perhaps what Houston nailed best was moderation." Everitt said that "[i]n a climate of reality shows ripe with 'oversinging', it's easy to appreciate Houston's ability to save melisma for just the right moment."

According to Steve Huey, writing for AllMusic, he stated "the shadow of Houston's prodigious technique still looms large over nearly every pop and R&B diva who has followed." Houston's emergence in the mid-1980s as a vocalist in popular music had a significant impact on the era of contemporary R&B spanning roughly from the mid-1980s to the early 2000s.

Houston's vocal talent also left an impact on songwriters. When Houston performed a jazz ballad-arranged rendition of Leon Russell's "A Song for You" inspired by Donny Hathaway's arrangement during her Welcome Home Heroes with Whitney Houston concert in 1991, Russell reportedly was so moved by her rendition that he wrote a letter to the singer expressing his admiration for her rendition, something he hadn't done before. Following the huge success of "I Will Always Love You", the song's writer and original performer Dolly Parton remarked how Houston helped Parton to be thought of as a songwriter. Said Parton: "I was just a girl with the big hair and big tits and a big personality, but I think that one kind of pointed a finger at me as a serious songwriter and the fact that it did so well and I was so touched by it and so honored by it. That one will stand out in my mind forever." Shannon Rubicam of Boy Meets Girl and co-writer of Houston's mega hit "I Wanna Dance with Somebody (Who Loves Me)" called Houston a "true recording artist, because she just found her way into making a song her own when she liked it."

In 2023, Rolling Stone ranked Houston second on their list of the greatest singers of all time, stating, "The standard-bearer for R&B vocals, Whitney Houston possessed a soprano that was as powerful as it was tender. Take her cover of Dolly Parton's 'I Will Always Love You', which became one of the defining singles of the 1990s; it opens with her gently brooding, her unaccompanied voice sounding like it's turning over the idea of leaving her lover behind with the lightest touch. By the end, it's transformed into a showcase for her limber, muscular upper register; she sings the title phrase with equal parts bone-deep feeling and technical perfection, turning the conflicted emotions at the song's heart into a jumping-off point for her life's next step."

In her review of I Look to You, music critic Ann Powers of the Los Angeles Times wrote, "[Houston's voice] stands like monuments upon the landscape of 20th century pop, defining the architecture of their times, sheltering the dreams of millions and inspiring the climbing careers of countless imitators". Powers added, "When she was at her best, nothing could match her huge, clean, cool mezzo-soprano". Elysa Gardner of the Los Angeles Times in her review for The Preacher's Wife soundtrack highly praised Houston's vocal ability, commenting, "She is first and foremost a pop diva – at that, the best one we have. No other female pop star – not Mariah Carey, not Celine Dion, not Barbra Streisand – quite rivals Houston in her exquisite vocal fluidity and purity of tone and her ability to infuse a lyric with mesmerizing melodrama."

In March 2020, the Library of Congress announced that Houston's 1992 single "I Will Always Love You" had been added to its National Recording Registry, a list of "aural treasures worthy of preservation" due to their "cultural, historical and aesthetic importance" in the American soundscape. Houston's debut album is listed as one of the 500 Greatest Albums of All Time by Rolling Stone magazine and is on Rock and Roll Hall of Fame's Definitive 200 Albums list. In 2004, Billboard picked the success of her first release on the charts as one of 110 Musical Milestones in its history. The first single "I Wanna Dance with Somebody (Who Loves Me)" from her second album was named as the best pop song in history by Billboard. On August 5, 2022, Beyoncé released "The Queens Remix" to her single "Break My Soul", in which she mentions Houston, along with other cultural icons.

== Achievements ==
=== In music ===
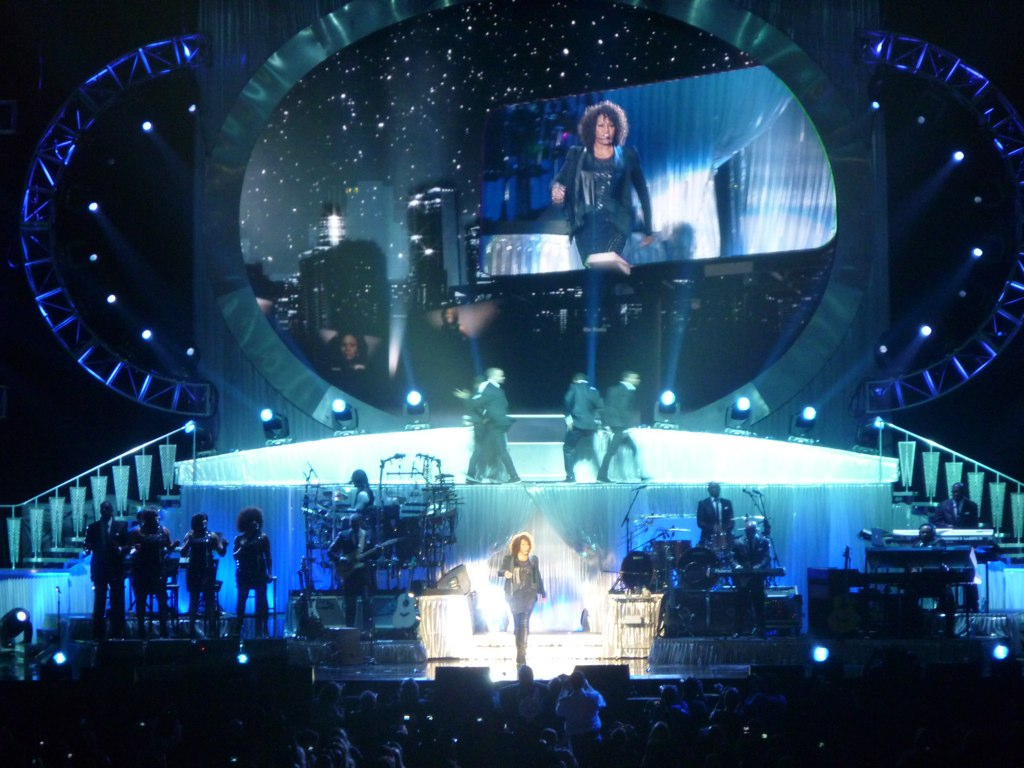
Houston performing at the Mediolanum Forum in Milan in 2010.

Houston has sold over 220 million record sales worldwide, ranking among the best-selling artists of all time. She is ranked by the RIAA as the best-selling female R&B artist of the 20th century and fifth highest-certified female artist in the United States, with 62 million album-equivalent units.

Houston is one of the most successful artists in Billboard history. In 2015, Houston was ranked the ninth most successful artist in the history of the Billboard Hot 100. With 11 number one singles on the Billboard Hot 100, Houston ranks as the seventh artist with the most number ones on the chart and fourth place among female artists. Houston is one of a few artists to have ten or more number one official singles on three or more Billboard genre charts, earning 10 number-one singles on the Adult Contemporary chart and 14 number-one singles on the Hot Dance Club Play chart. With those accomplishments, she ranks in 15th and 13th place among the Greatest Adult Contemporary Artists and Greatest Top Dance Club Artists lists, respectively. In 2010, Houston was ranked third place among its "Top 50 R&B/Hip-Hop Artists of the Past 25 Years" list, having earned eight number-one singles on the Hot R&B/Hip-Hop Songs chart and five number-one albums on the Top R&B/Hip-Hop Albums chart.

Houston set and broke several chart records throughout her career. Her debut album, Whitney Houston, produced three number-one singles on the Billboard Hot 100, which set a record for female artists at the time for the most number-ones off a single album. The same album topped the Billboard 200 year-end chart, making her the first female artist to accomplish this milestone. Her 1987 sophomore album, Whitney, became the first album by a female artist to debut at number-one on the Billboard 200. The same album produced four number-one singles on the Billboard Hot 100, which was a record for a female artist at the time. In April 1988, Houston became the first and only artist to produce seven consecutive number-one singles on the Billboard Hot 100, breaking a longstanding record set by the Beatles and the Bee Gees. In February 1991, Houston became the first female artist to record multiple number-one singles off three albums or more. Houston became the first artist of the Nielsen Soundscan era to have three singles enter the top twenty of the Billboard Hot 100 simultaneously with "I Will Always Love You", "I'm Every Woman" and "I Have Nothing" making the top 11. In addition, in its sixth week of release, The Bodyguard became the first in history to sell over a million copies in a single week, later paving the way for albums who sold a million within the first week.

Her 1987 hit, "I Wanna Dance with Somebody (Who Loves Me)", reportedly sold 18 million copies worldwide, making it the best-selling 1980s single by a female artist. Her 1992 rendition of "I Will Always Love You" broke many chart records. It stayed at number-one on the Billboard Hot 100 for fourteen weeks, an all-time record at the time. It continues to hold records for being the song with the most consecutive weeks at number-one by a female artist, by a solo artist, and also the record for the longest-running number-one single from a soundtrack. The song would top the charts in 33 other countries and would sell 24 million copies worldwide, becoming the best-selling single by a female artist.

In November 1993, Houston’s soundtrack to The Bodyguard was certified ten times platinum (later re-certified as diamond) for sales of over ten million copies, marking the first time in history that a female artist achieved this milestone. Two months later, in January 1994, her 1985 debut studio album, Whitney Houston, was also certified ten times platinum, making Houston the first female artist to have multiple albums certified diamond. In October 2020, her second studio album, Whitney, was certified diamond for over ten million copies in sales. As a result, Houston became the first black recording artist to produce three albums to go diamond by the Recording Industry Association of America. All three aforementioned albums are often ranked as some of the best-selling albums of all time, with The Bodyguard as the best-selling album by a female artist of all time with sales of 45 million copies worldwide while her debut album is the best selling debut album of all time by a solo artist at 25 million.

In November 1995, Houston's single "Exhale (Shoop Shoop)" set further chart records. It became just the third single in Billboard Hot 100 to enter the chart at number one. It was also the first soundtrack single to debut at the top spot and as of 2026 is only one of just five soundtrack songs to do so. Until 2021, it also held the record for the most weeks lingering at the second spot following its number one debut for eleven weeks, later overtaken by the song "Stay" by The Kid Laroi and Justin Bieber at twelve weeks. It still holds that chart record as a solo artist and as a female artist, shared only with Olivia Rodrigo's "Good 4 U", also released in 2021. It also holds the record for most consecutive weeks at the second spot after its number one debut. Houston's eleventh and final number one single on the Billboard Hot 100, it tied Houston as the female artist with the most number one singles with fellow pop superstar Madonna before Mariah Carey broke the record in 1997 with "Honey".

Houston's 1996 soundtrack to The Preacher's Wife set the longest single-week sales of a gospel album in the United States with over 330,000 copies during its sixth week of release. It would eventually sell over three million copies in the United States, half a million copies in Asia and over a million copies in Europe, and would sell over six million copies worldwide, becoming the best selling gospel release in history. Houston's sixth and final non-holiday studio album, I Look to You (2009) helped her to establish a chart record for Houston having the most cumulative weeks at number one by a female artist with over 46 weeks, a record Houston held until 2020. The album also topped several European charts upon its release, the first since 1998's My Love Is Your Love.

In the weeks following the singer's death in 2012, Houston would set more chart records. Her 1992 hit "I Will Always Love You" re-entered the Billboard Hot 100 at number seven on February 25, 2012, making her the first female artist to have the same song re-enter the top ten twice. Joining Madonna, whose single "Give Me All Your Luvin'" entered the same chart at number ten, they became just the third and fourth female artists to have top ten placements on the Hot 100 in four different decades, joining Cher and Barbra Streisand.

The following week, on March 3, it re-peaked at number three on the same chart, marking the first time a single had done so since "The Twist" by Chubby Checker in 1962 had re-peaked at number one for that year after previously topping the chart two years prior. That same week, Houston became the first posthumous artist to land three songs inside the top 40 with previous hits "I Wanna Dance with Somebody (Who Loves Me)" and "Greatest Love of All" re-peaking at numbers 25 and 36 respectively. A fourth re-entry, "How Will I Know", entered the top fifty at number 49.

For the week of March 3, Houston set several new chart records on the Billboard 200. The first record occurred when three of her albums - Whitney: The Greatest Hits, The Bodyguard and Whitney Houston - simultaneously charted inside the top ten. The second was when ten of Houston's albums, including the recently released box set, Triple Feature (featuring three of Houston's albums I'm Your Baby Tonight, My Love Is Your Love and Just Whitney), simultaneously charted in the same week, a record Houston held until 2023.

Around the same time, Houston re-entered global charts including Australia and the United Kingdom. In the UK alone, Houston set an all-time chart record after twelve of her songs re-entered the top 75 of the UK singles chart, breaking Amy Winehouse's previous record of eleven from the year before after Winehouse's own untimely passing.

In 2019, Houston returned to several Billboard singles charts with the Kygo-remixed version of her previously unreleased rendition of "Higher Love". On the Billboard Hot 100, it entered and peaked at number 63, giving Houston her highest chart peak since 2000 and becoming her milestone 40th hit on the chart. On the Dance Club Songs chart, it became her fourteenth number one single. In 2020, it peaked at number seven on the Adult Contemporary chart and remained on the chart for 40 weeks. In achieving this milestone, Houston broke Barbra Streisand's record of being the female artist with the longest chart span of top ten singles on the adult contemporary chart at 35 years, 6 months and 18 days, surpassing Streisand's span of 32 years, 7 months and 12 days.

=== In film and television ===
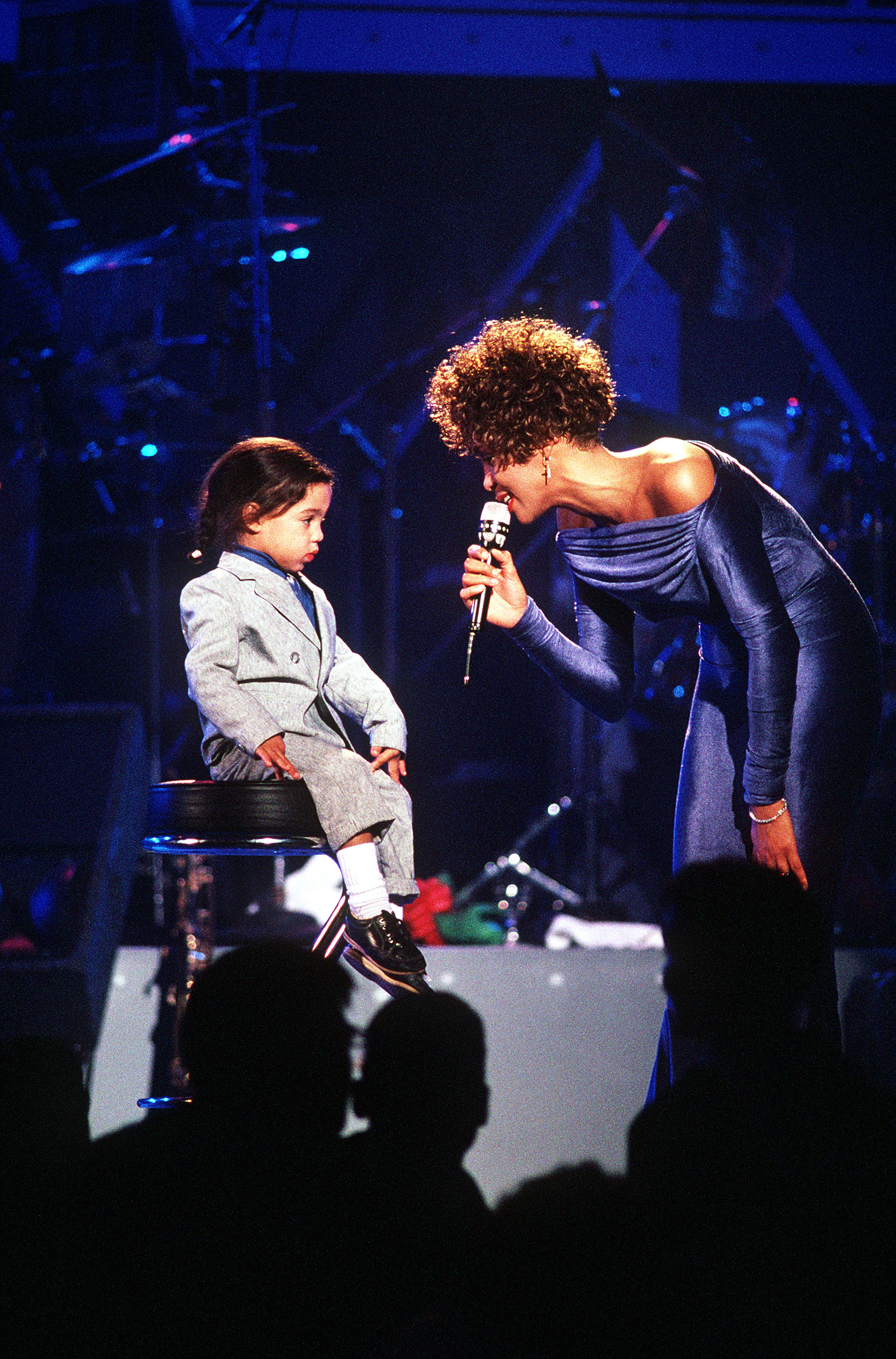
Houston performing "Greatest Love of All" at the Welcome Home Heroes with Whitney Houston concert in 1991, which at the time was the highest viewed concert in the history of HBO.

Houston's first film, The Bodyguard, was enormously successful upon its release in 1992. The film's total global net gross was $410.9 million in its initial run, which was a record for Warner Bros. Pictures at the time. As a result, it became the second-highest-grossing film of 1992, behind Aladdin, which opened on the same day. At the time of its release, it was the tenth-highest-grossing film of all time. For her role in the film, Houston was ranked inside the top thirty by Billboard on its list of "The 100 Best Acting Performances by Musicians in Movies", with the magazine writing that "though she plays to type, it’s the realism that she brings to the role -- the confidence, the panic and the fear -- that makes it such a captivating performance, one that safely holds a place among musician debuts on the big screen." Initially panned by critics after its release, The Bodyguard later received belated praise in publications such as Variety, Collider, CinemaBlend, Marie Claire and Glamour.

Her next film, Waiting to Exhale (1995), was also a financial success, opening at number one at the North American box office and grossing $14.1 million its first weekend of release. It eventually grossed $67.05 million in North America and another $14.4 million internationally, for a total worldwide gross of $81.45 million, proving that films starring predominantly black actresses could be a blockbuster hit. It was the 26th highest-grossing film of 1995, according to box office receipts.

For her third film, The Preacher's Wife in 1996, Houston earned over $10 million, which made her the first black actress to earn that much for a motion picture, making her one of the top ten most bankable film actresses of that time. The film was a more moderate commercial success but has been regarded as one of the greatest Christmas-themed films in movie history.

Houston earned several acting nods throughout her film career, including three successive NAACP Image Award nominations for Outstanding Actress in a Motion Picture, eventually winning one for her role in The Preacher's Wife. Houston is considered by some as one of the "greatest singers-turned-actors of all time". Houston was cited as one of three female performers to achieve similar levels of music and film along with Barbra Streisand and Jennifer Lopez.

Houston also achieved success on television. Her 1986 Grammy Awards performance of her hit "Saving All My Love for You" resulted in Houston winning the Primetime Emmy Award for Outstanding Individual Performance in a Variety or Music Program. Her 1988 performance at the Nelson Mandela 70th Birthday Tribute attracted a worldwide audience of over 600 million viewers, becoming just the second largest viewed rock charity concert after Live Aid. In 1991, Houston received the CableACE Award for Best Performance in a Music Special or Series for her HBO concert special, Welcome Home Heroes with Whitney Houston. The special, her first of three for the network, was the highest-rated concert in HBO history at the time. It earned a then all-time rating of 7.9 million viewers. Her follow-up HBO concert specials, Whitney: The Concert for a New South Africa (1994) and Classic Whitney: Live from Washington, D.C. (1997), also were ratings winners. In 1999, Houston co-headlined the TV special VH1 Divas Live '99, which drew 19.4 million viewers and became the highest-rated program in VH1's history at the time.

In addition, Houston had impact as both a film and television producer. In the latter, Houston helped to produce a modern day rendition of Rodgers & Hammerstein's Cinderella (1997). The telecast aired to over 60 million viewers who watched at least a portion of the film, becoming the most-watched television musical in several years and earning more viewership than 1993's Gypsy. According to the Nielsen ratings, Cinderella averaged a 22.3 rating and 31 share (although it was originally estimated that the program had earned only an 18.8 rating), which is believed to have been bolstered by the film's strong appeal towards women and adults between the ages of 18 and 49.

Translated, this means that 31 percent of televisions in the United States aired the premiere, while 23 million different households tuned in to the broadcast. Surprisingly, 70 percent of Cinderella's total viewership that evening consisted of females under the age of 18, specifically ages two to 11. The broadcast attracted a particularly high number of younger audience members, including children, teenagers and young adults, in turn making Cinderella the television season's most popular family show.

Houston also produced the first two films in the Cheetah Girls franchise. Both films broke ratings records for Disney, with the first film premiering to 6.5 million viewers, then a record for the channel, while its sequel earned 8.2 million viewers. As a film producer, Houston helped to produce the first two box office films based on The Princess Diaries Both films earned over $100 million in the box office, making Houston one of the first black film producers to accomplish this. The films were responsible for making the then-unknown actress Anne Hathaway a box office star.

== Creative inspiration ==
=== Influence ===
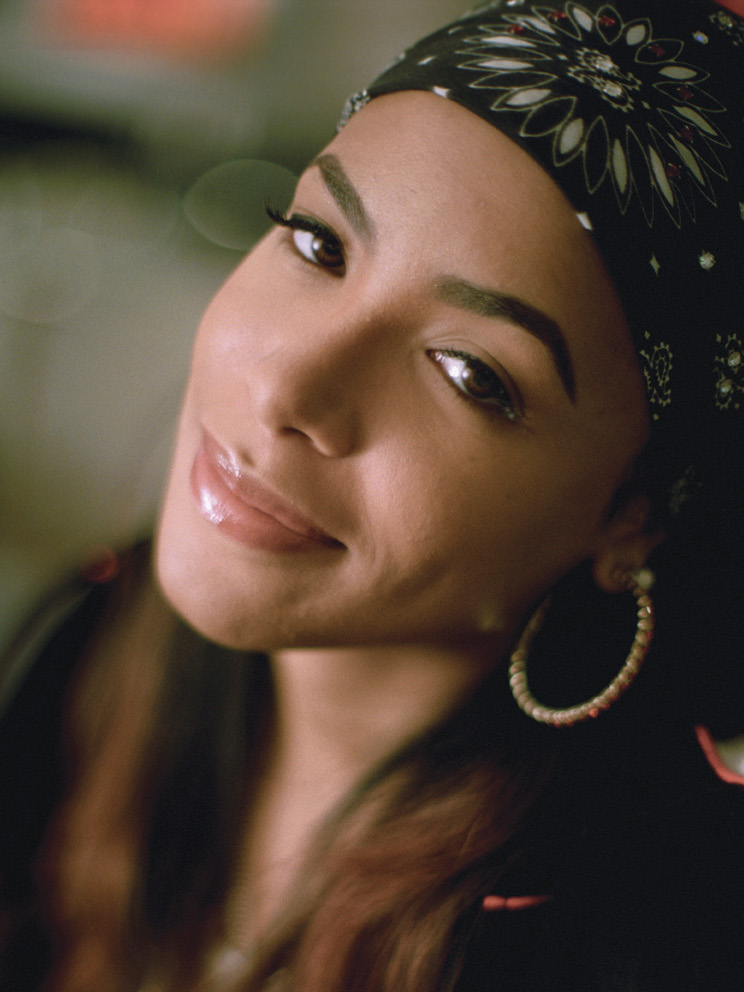
Aaliyah

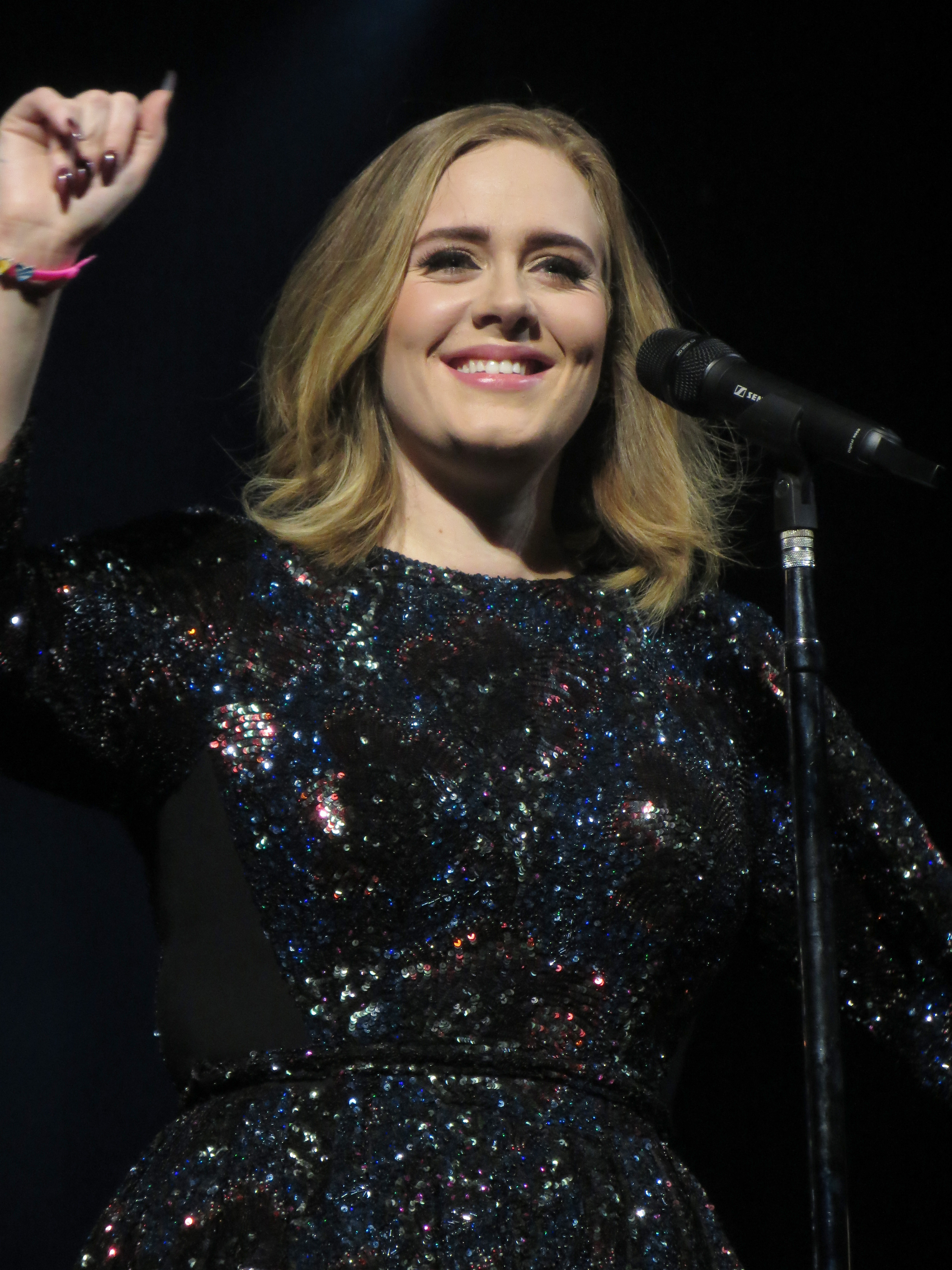
Adele

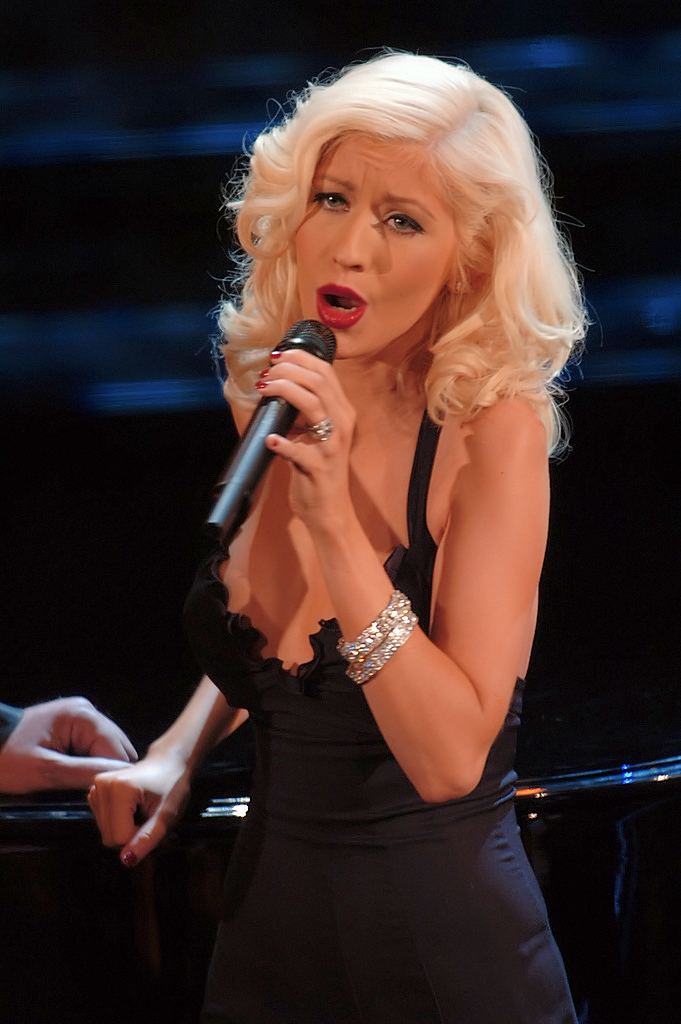
Christina Aguilera

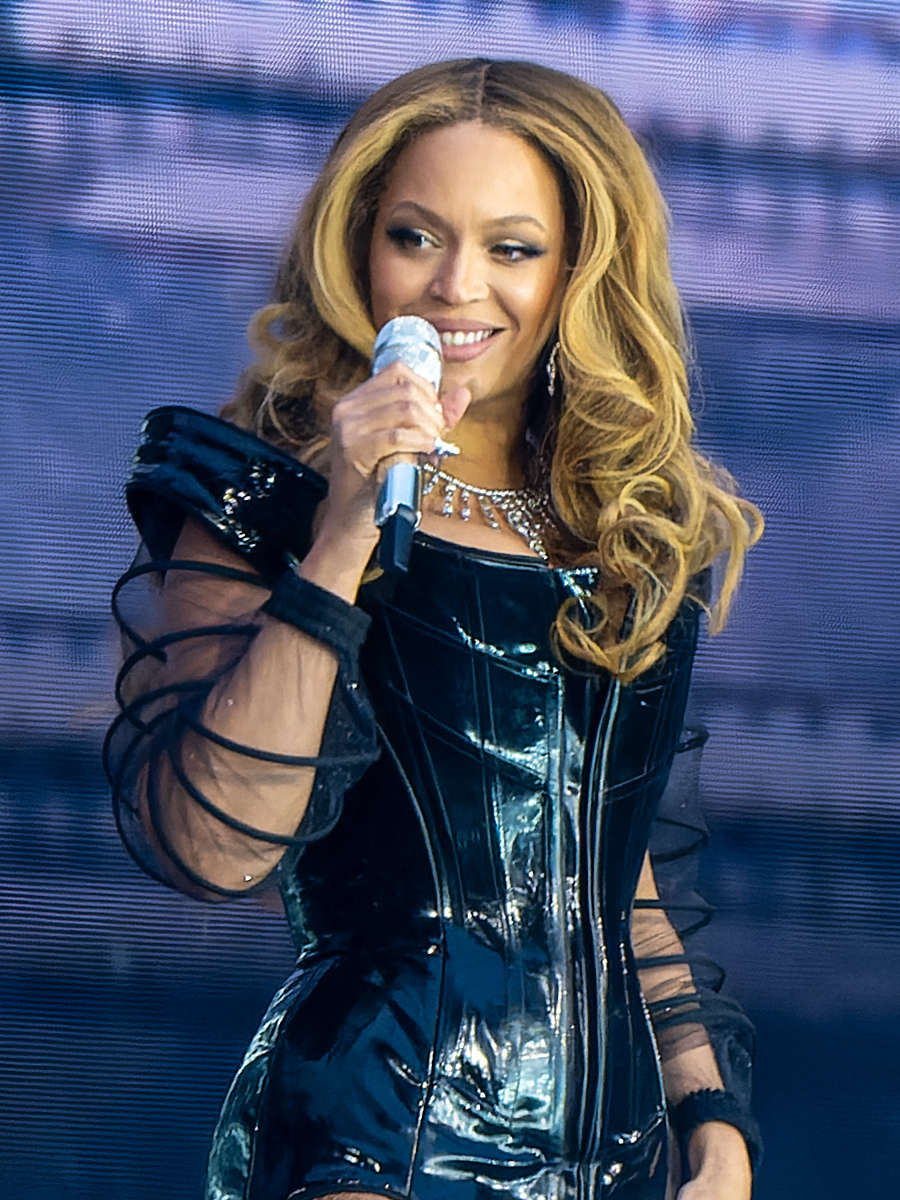
Beyoncé

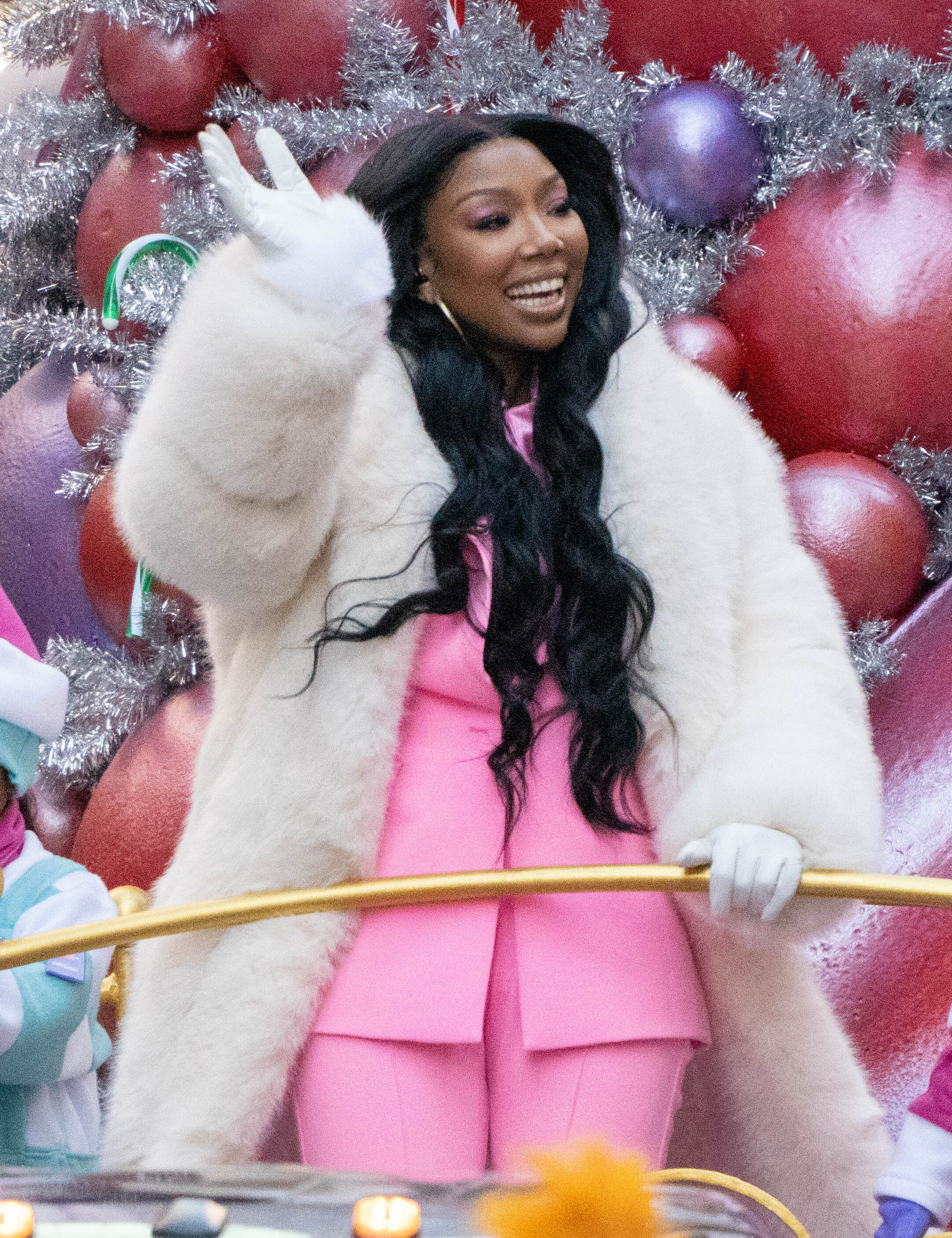
Brandy

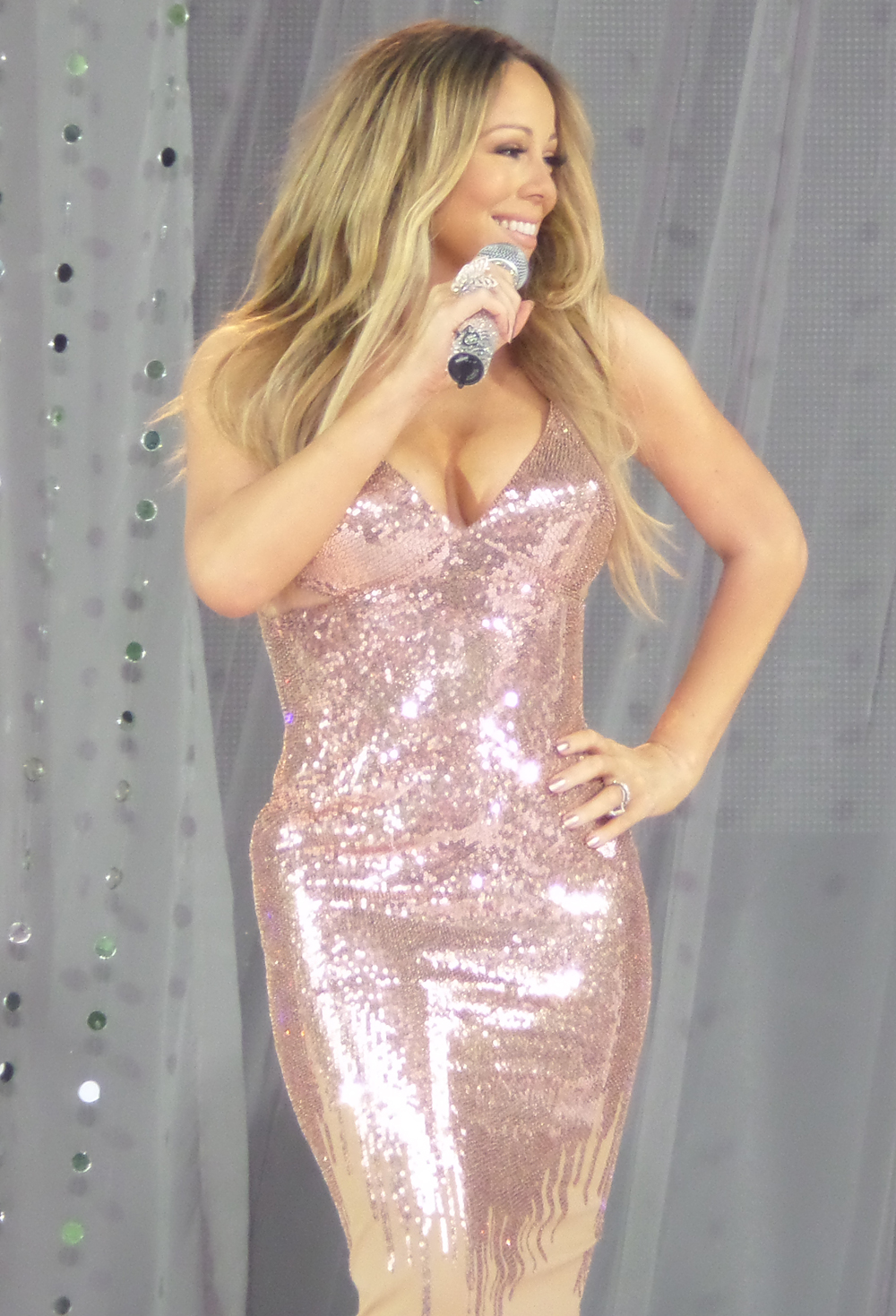
Mariah Carey

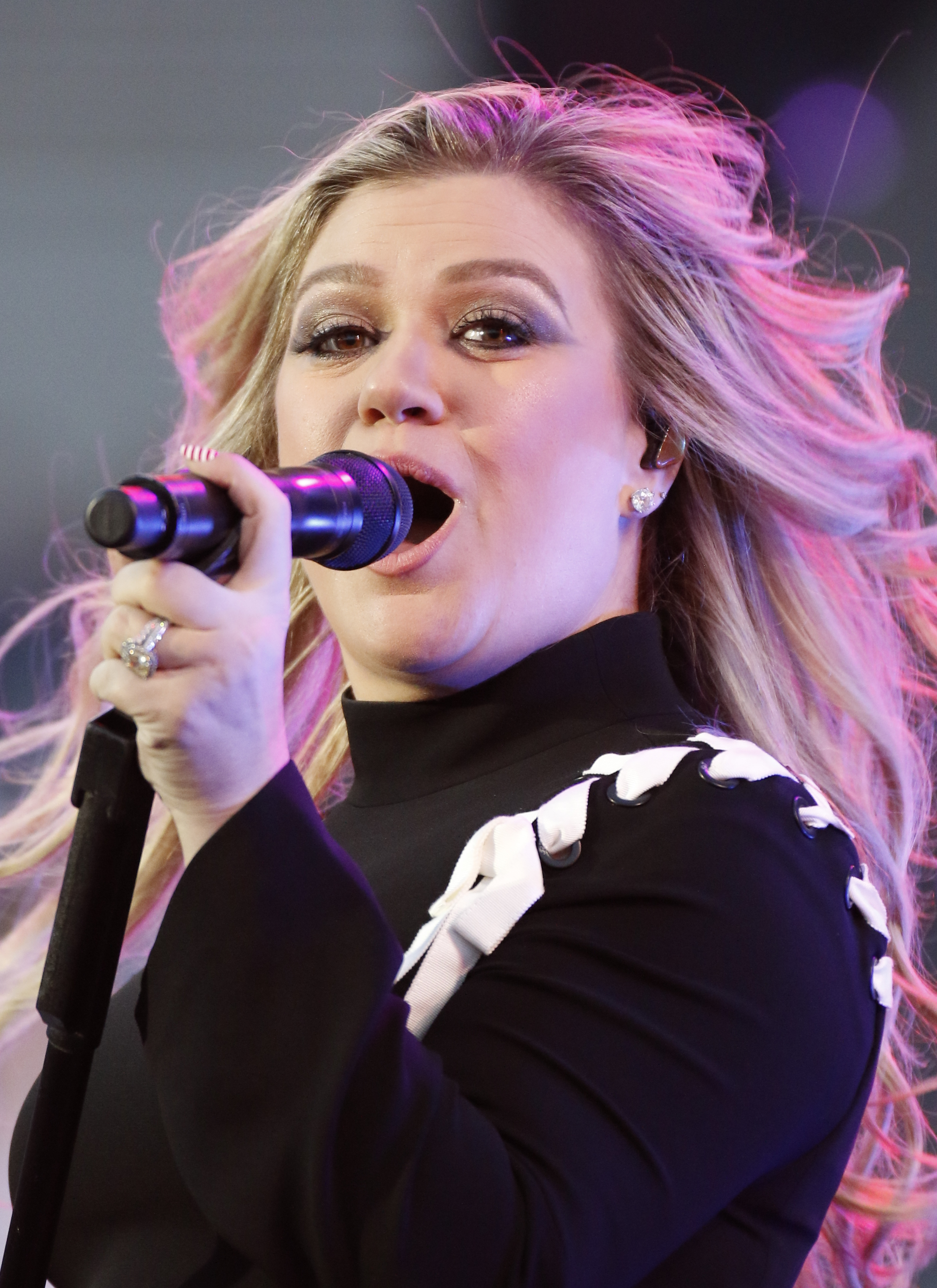
Kelly Clarkson

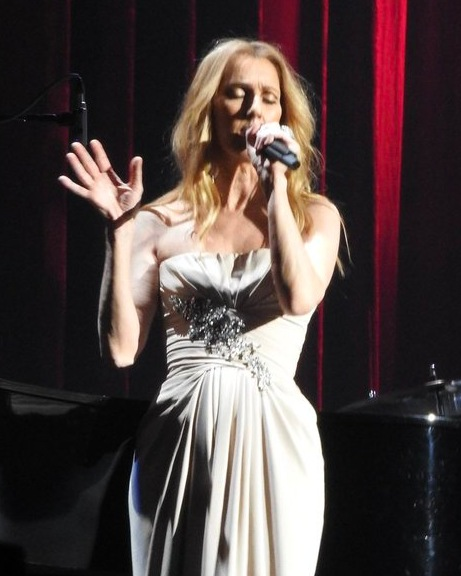
Celine Dion

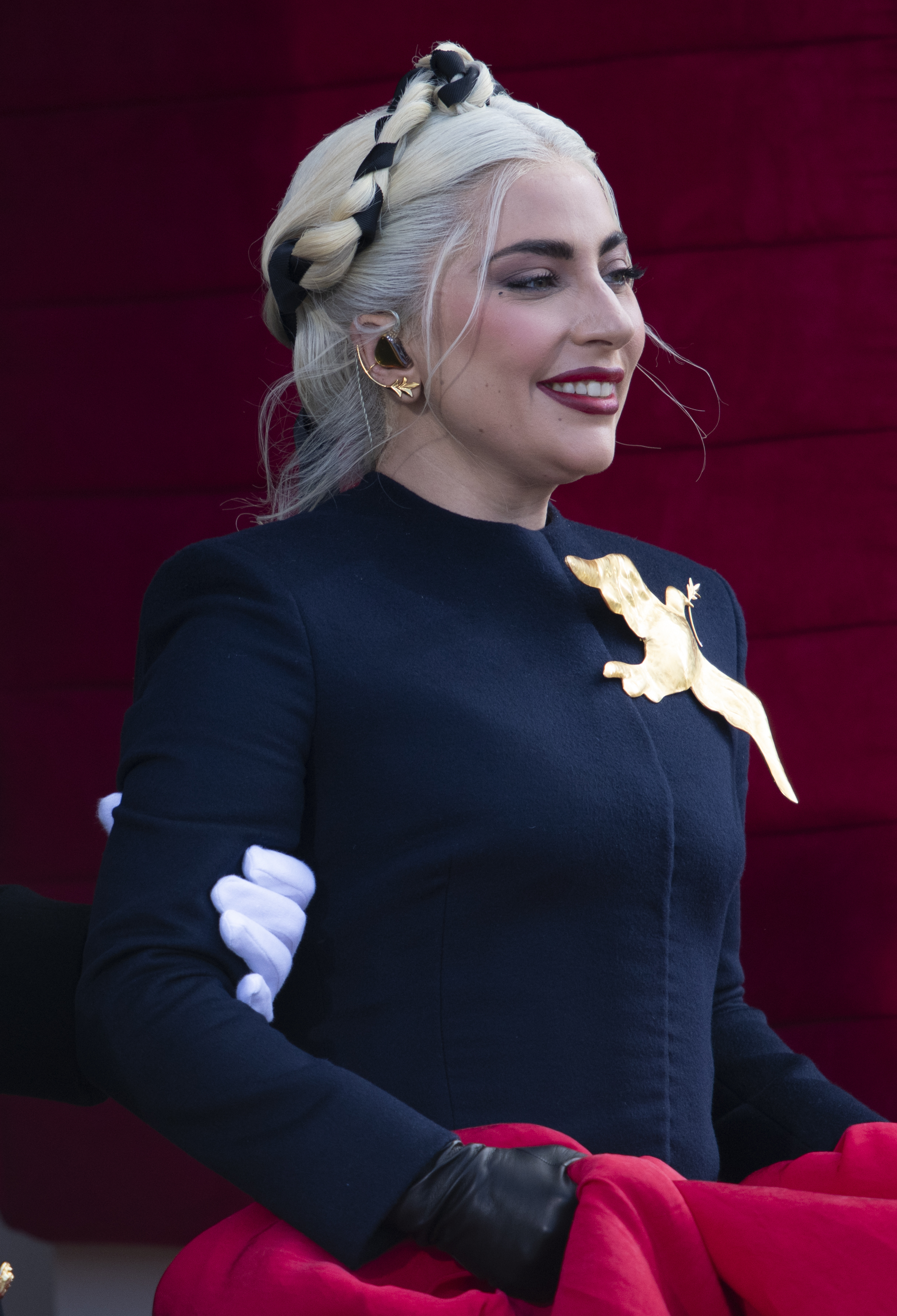
Lady Gaga

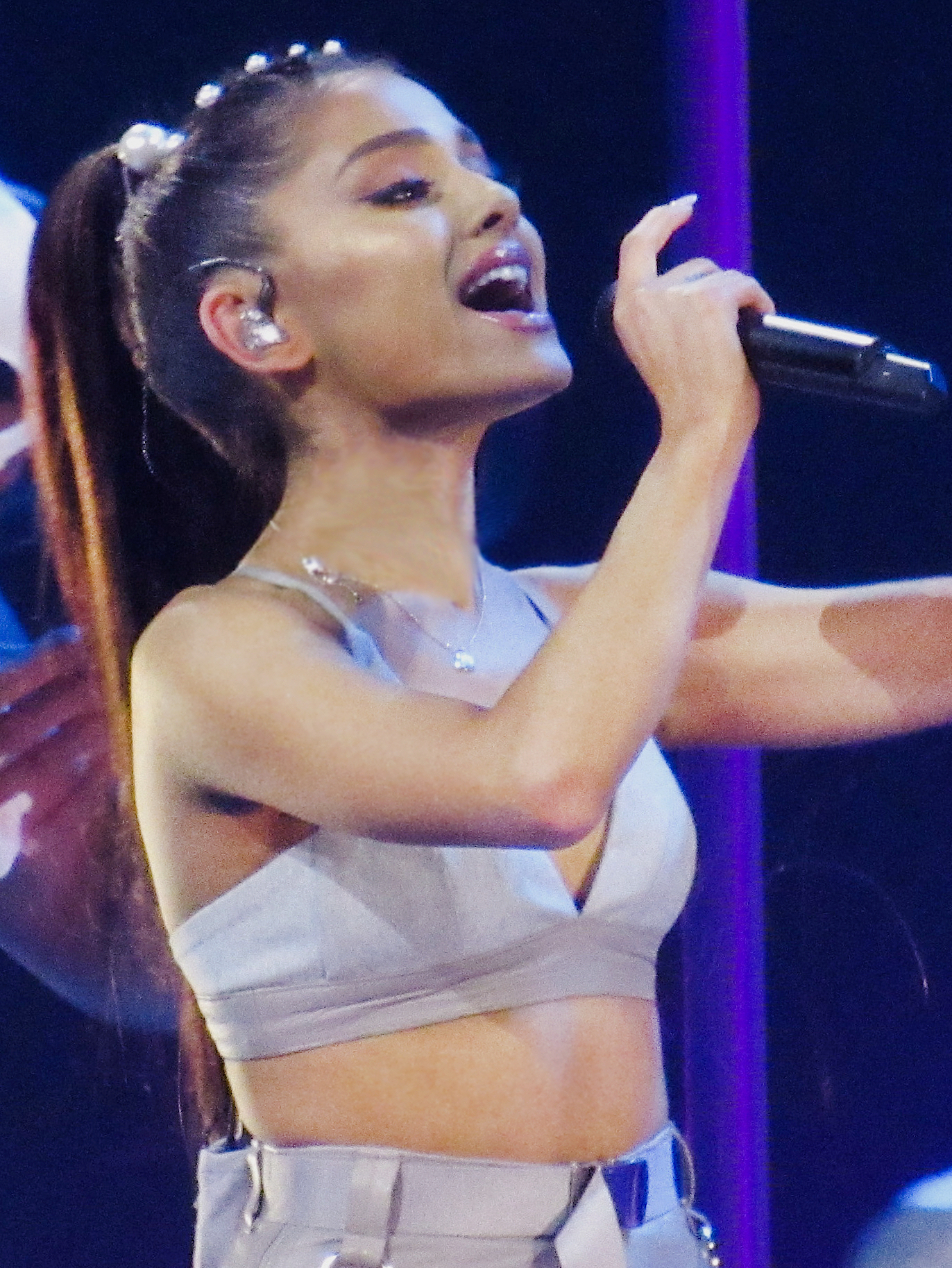
Ariana Grande

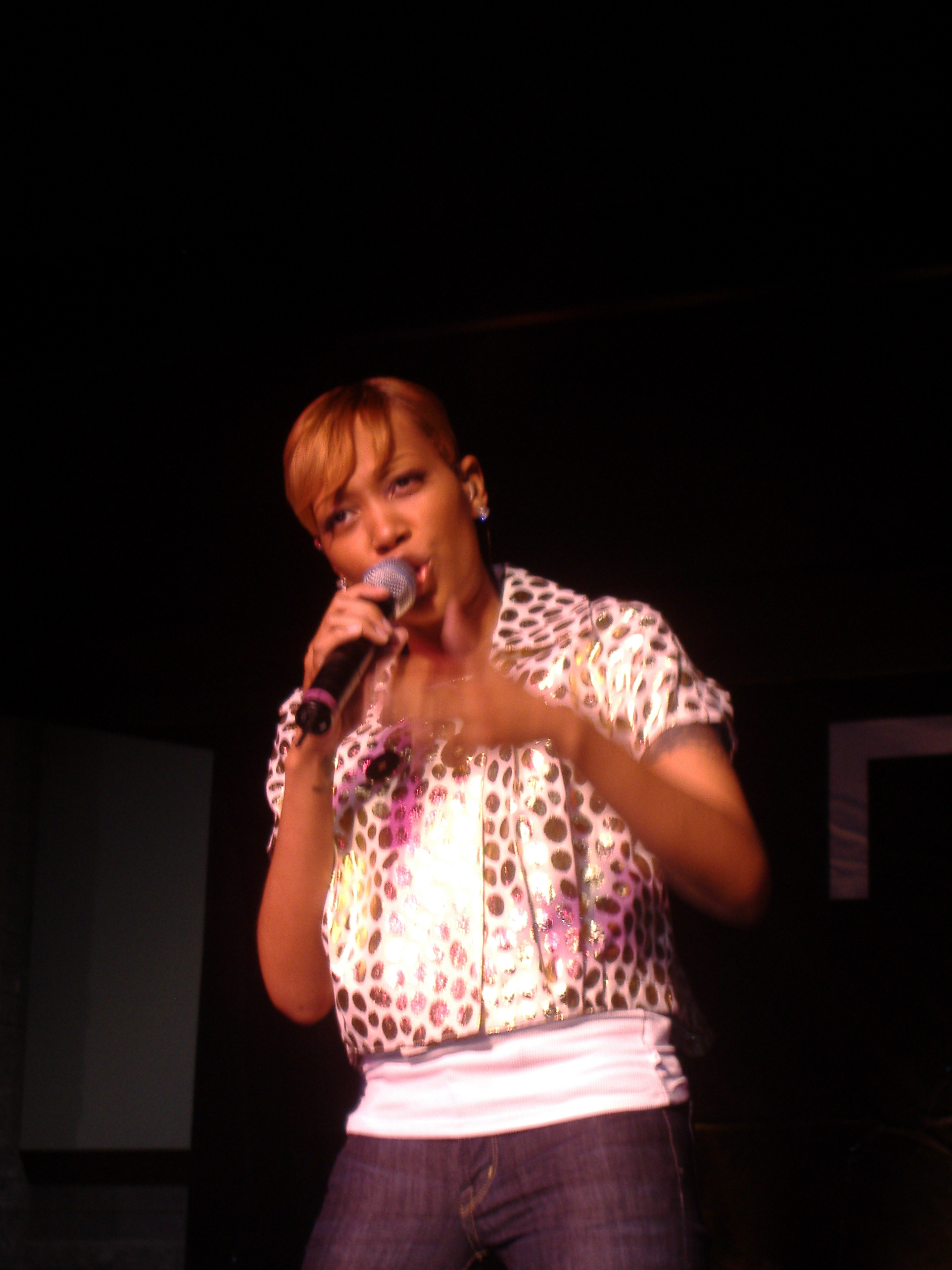
Monica

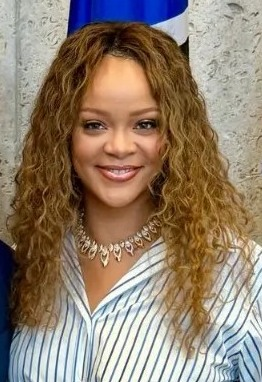
Rihanna

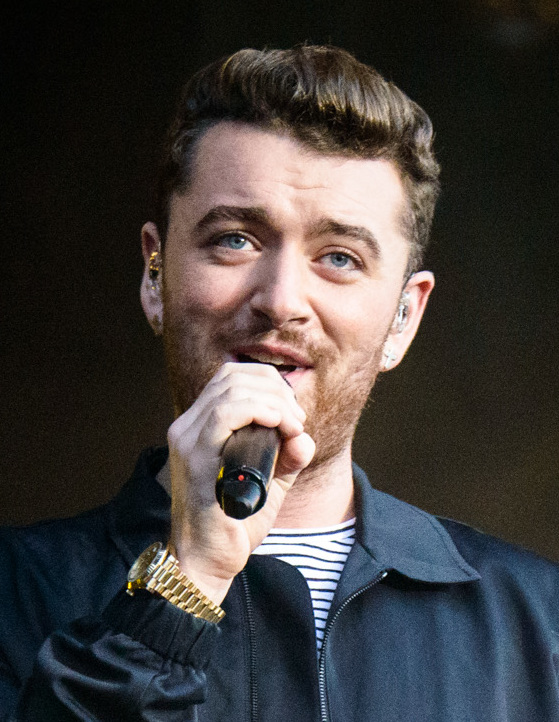
Sam Smith

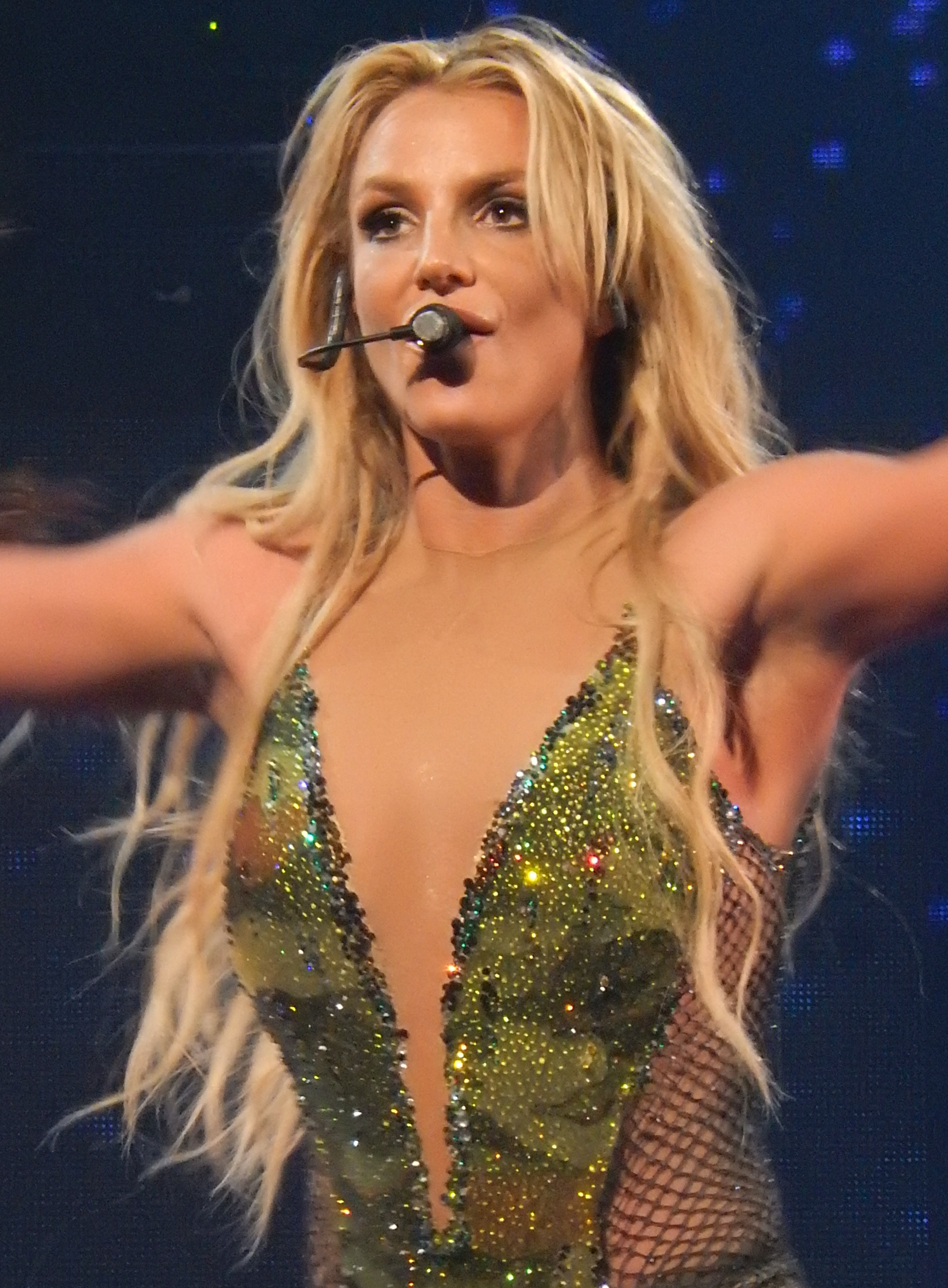
Britney Spears

Several artists have cited Houston as an influence including those pictured above.

Since her career's inception in 1977, Houston has influenced and inspired various number of artists all over the world. Producer, musician, and former American Idol judge Randy Jackson named Houston, along with Mariah Carey and Celine Dion as the voices of the modern era. Of Houston, in particular, with whom he played bass guitar on some of her recordings including, most notably, "How Will I Know" and "I Wanna Dance with Somebody (Who Loves Me)", Jackson called her "the voice of a generation". As part of the "1990s vocal trinity" with Carey and Dion, Houston was widely credited with reviving the power ballad, and in doing so reshaping the adult contemporary radio format, making it one of the most popular formats of the 1990s and the early 2000s. Songwriter Diane Warren, who wrote seven songs for Houston in a 20-year span including the hits "I Learned From the Best" and "I Didn't Know My Own Strength", said about the singer after her death, "She influenced every singer that we know, (every) modern singer has been influenced by Whitney Houston, whether it's Christina Aguilera. Celine (Dion). Mariah (Carey). They all got it from Whitney. ... Her music will live on forever." Canadian singer Rêve recorded the song "Whitney" (2022), which was in tribute to Houston and her 1993 hit cover of "I'm Every Woman", which she sampled. The song went to number 29 on the Canadian Hot 100.

Various artists who have named Houston as a major influence and inspiration include:

- Aaliyah
- Adele
- Agnes Carlsson
- Alexia
- Alicia Keys
- Ariana Grande
- Ari Lennox
- Ashanti
- Ava Max
- Beyoncé
- Brandy
- Britney Spears
- Bruno Mars
- Calum Scott
- Celine Dion
- Christina Aguilera
- Ciara
- Coco Jones
- Deborah Cox
- Demi Lovato
- Giorgia
- Jennifer Hudson
- Jennifer Lopez
- Jessie J
- Jessica Simpson
- JMSN
- Jordin Sparks
- Katy Perry
- Kelly Clarkson
- Kelly Rowland
- Lady Gaga
- Laura Pausini
- Lucky Daye
- LeAnn Rimes
- Leona Lewis
- Mariah Carey
- Melanie Fiona
- Michael Jackson
- Miley Cyrus
- Monica
- Muni Long
- Natalie Imbruglia
- Nicki Minaj
- Nicole Scherzinger
- Olivia Dean
- Pia Toscano
- Pink
- Rihanna
- Robin Thicke
- Sabrina Carpenter
- Sam Smith
- Samara Joy
- Selena
- Sheléa
- Stacie Orrico
- Taylor Swift
- Toni Braxton
- Tyla
- Zara Larsson

Singer and entertainer Michael Jackson named Houston as one of his musical inspirations, calling her a "wonderful singer, real stylist. You hear one line, and you know who it is." Tony Bennett said of Houston: "When I first heard her, I called Clive Davis and said, 'You finally found the greatest singer I've ever heard in my life.'"

R&B singer Faith Evans stated: "Whitney was not just a singer with a beautiful voice. She was a true musician. Her voice was an instrument and she knew how to use it. With the same complexity as someone who has mastered the violin or the piano, Whitney mastered the use of her voice. From every run to every crescendo—she was in tune with what she could do with her voice and it's not something simple for a singer—even a very talented one—to achieve. Whitney is 'the Voice' because she worked for it. This is someone who was singing backup for her mom when she was 14 years old at nightclubs across the country. This is someone who sang backup for Chaka Khan when she was only 17. She had years and years of honing her craft on stage and in the studio before she ever got signed to a record label. Coming from a family of singers and surrounded by music; she pretty much had a formal education in music, just like someone who might attend a performing arts high school or major in voice in college."

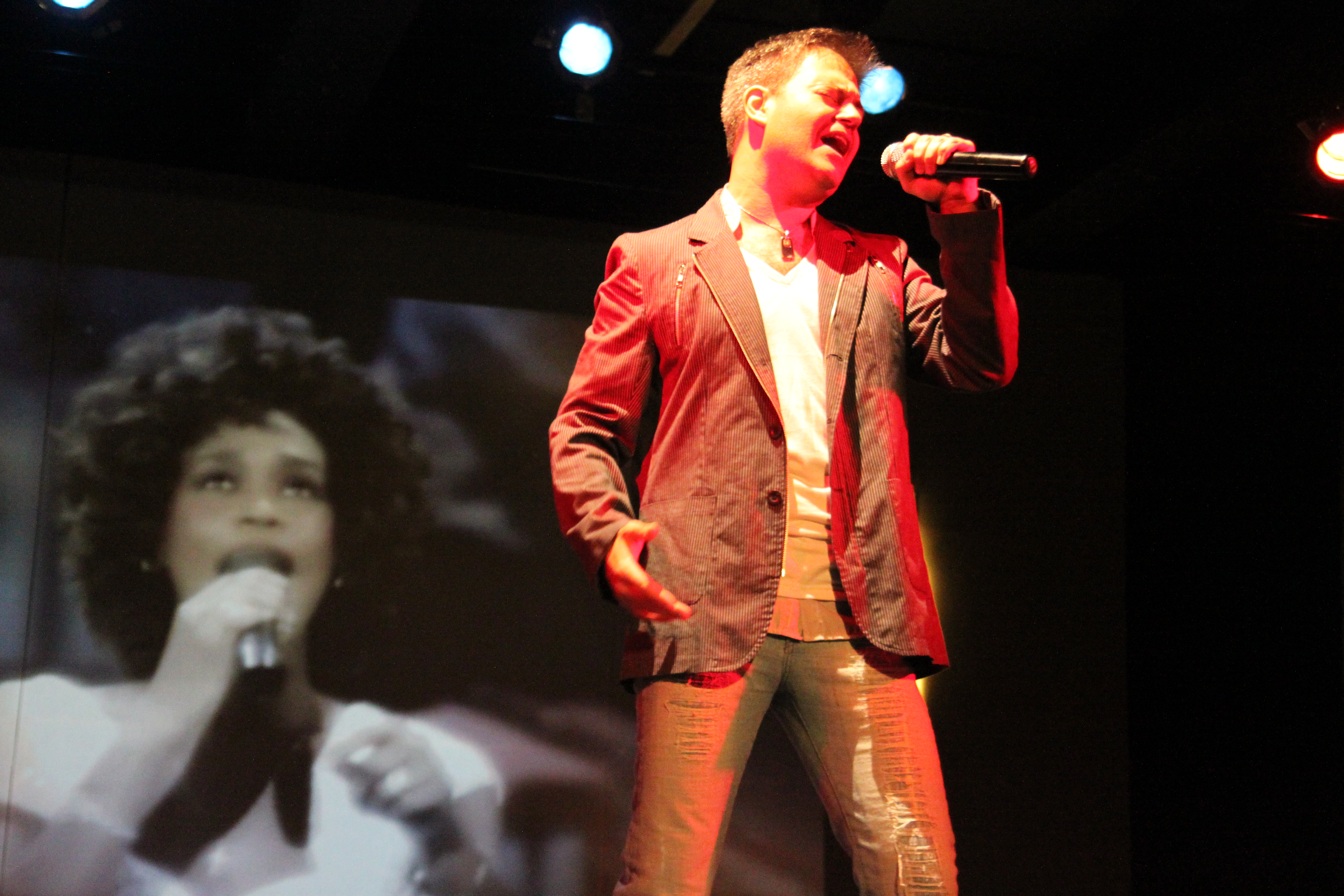
A singer pays tribute to Houston

Mariah Carey, who was often compared to Houston, said, "She [Houston] has been a big influence on me." She later told USA Today that "none of us would sound the same if Aretha Franklin hadn't ever put out a record, or Whitney Houston hadn't." Celine Dion who was the third member of the troika that dominated female pop singing in the 1990s, did a telephone interview with Good Morning America on February 13, 2012, saying "Whitney's been an amazing inspiration for me. I've been singing with her my whole career, actually. I wanted to have a career like hers, sing like her, look beautiful like her." Beyoncé told the Globe and Mail that Houston "inspired [her] to get up there and do what [she] did". She also wrote on her website on the day after Houston's death, "I, like every singer, always wanted to be just like [Houston]. Her voice was perfect. Strong but soothing. Soulful and classic. Her vibrato, her cadence, her control. So many of my life's memories are attached to a Whitney Houston song. She is our queen and she opened doors and provided a blueprint for all of us."

Mary J. Blige said that Houston inviting her onstage during VH1's Divas Live show in 1999 "opened doors for [her] all over the world". Brandy stated, "The first Whitney Houston CD was genius. That CD introduced the world to her angelic yet powerful voice. Without Whitney, half of this generation of singers wouldn't be singing." Kelly Rowland, in an Ebony feature article celebrating black music in June 2006, recalled that "[I] wanted to be a singer after I saw Whitney Houston on TV singing 'Greatest Love of All'. I wanted to sing like Whitney Houston in that red dress." She added that "and I have never, ever forgotten that song [Greatest Love of All]. I learned it backward, forward, sideways. The video still brings chills to me. When you wish and pray for something as a kid, you never know what blessings God will give you."

Alicia Keys said "Whitney is an artist who inspired me from [the time I was] a little girl." Oscar winner Jennifer Hudson cites Houston as her biggest musical influence. She told Newsday that she learned from Houston the "difference between being able to sing and knowing how to sing". Leona Lewis, who has been called "the new Whitney Houston", also cites her as an influence. Lewis stated that she idolized her as a little girl. In 2026, Olympics gymnast Jordan Chiles mentioned in an interview that she would "love to leave a legacy like Beyoncé or Whitney Houston".

=== Covers and samples ===
Houston's music has been recorded, sampled and performed by a variety of artists. One of the first songs of Houston's to be covered was "Eternal Love", her collaboration with Paul Jabara on his album, Paul Jabara & Friends (1983) by fellow soul singer Stephanie Mills on her album, Merciless (1983), less than two years before Houston officially released her debut album. In addition, Houston's voice on the Michael Zager Band's "Life's a Party" (1978) was sampled on the track "Take Me (Ce Soir)" by Sedat the Turkish Avenger.

Her 1987 hit, "I Wanna Dance with Somebody (Who Loves Me)" has been covered more than 337 times from various artists of different musical genres, according to the sample database site, WhoSampled. Among its most prominent covers include versions from Fall Out Boy, Ashley Tisdale, Jessie J, David Byrne, Evanescence, James Bay and Sleep Token among others. The same song has been sampled 124 times, including most prominently in songs such as pop artist Bebe Rexha and rapper Lil Wayne's "The Way I Are (Dance With Somebody)", "Dance!" by singer Lumidee and hip-hop artist Fatman Scoop, singer Natalie La Rose's "Somebody" ft. Jeremih, and country artist Thomas Rhett's "Don't Wanna Dance", which interpolated the song's chorus. In addition, the song's sound and style deeply influenced Rick Astley's 1988 hit, "She Wants to Dance with Me" and Lady Gaga's 2011 song, "Fashion of His Love", which was included in special editions of her hit album, Born This Way.

Female rap trio Salt-N-Pepa interpolated Houston's 1991 hit, "My Name Is Not Susan" for their own hit, "Whatta Man" (1993).

R&B artist Sevyn Streeter sampled Houston's 1985 hit, "Saving All My Love for You", for her song, "My Love for You" (2019). Natalie Grant and Dolly Parton covered Houston's 1997 gospel-dance hit "Step by Step" in 2023. Ariana Grande and Cynthia Erivo covered "When You Believe" at the 2024 Met Gala.

Her landmark cover of "I Will Always Love You" from The Bodyguard has been covered over 191 times and sampled 64 times, including acts such as Canadian DJ Sickick, British rapper Theophilus London and the R&B group Next. Among the most notable covers of Houston's rendition of the song include Zapp & Roger and Shirley Murdock, LeAnn Rimes, Keke Wyatt, Jennifer Hudson and Beyoncé.

Canadian rapper Drake sampled Houston's 1993 hit, "I Have Nothing", for his song, "Tuscan Leather", which opened his acclaimed 2013 album, Nothing Was the Same while rapper French Montana sampled the same song for his 2011 song, "Bend You Over". The same song has been covered over 128 times, with versions by Jazmine Sullivan, Jack Vidgen, Ariana Grande, Deborah Cox and David Phelps among others.

Following her death in 2012, the TV show Glee dedicated an episode to Houston on their third season titled "Dance with Somebody" and featured several covers of Houston's work sung by the show's cast including Matthew Morrison, Amber Riley, Darren Criss and Chris Colfer. Of the covers, "It's Not Right but It's Okay" and "How Will I Know" made the Billboard Hot 100, while a third, a cover of "I Wanna Dance with Somebody", made the Canadian Hot 100.

Houston is the most covered female artist in the history of American Idol with over 50 covers of her music performed during the show, only behind Stevie Wonder, The Beatles and Elton John, with "I Have Nothing" being the most frequently covered song in the show's history with over fourteen covers performed during the live shows.

At the BET Awards in June 2012, Monica, Brandy, Chaka Khan, brother Gary Garland and mother Cissy Houston all took part in performing Houston's songs in tribute to Houston, who performed at the first annual BET Awards in June 2001 and was the first recipient of the BET Lifetime Achievement Award. On December 16, 2012, singers Jordin Sparks, Melanie Fiona and Ledisi paid tribute to Houston on the 2012 Divas Live program, a show Houston had been a constant presence on, going back to 1999, singing Houston classics such as "I'm Every Woman", "I Wanna Dance with Somebody (Who Loves Me)" and "How Will I Know".

Pop singer Pink referenced Houston and "I Wanna Dance with Somebody" in her 2022 single, "Never Gonna Not Dance Again".

Other artists who have sampled and covered Houston over the years include Ariana Grande, Celine Dion, Christina Aguilera, Chante Moore, Jennifer Holliday, Babyface, Kelly Rowland, Katy Perry, Robin Thicke, Usher, Rapsody, Don Toliver, Tamar Braxton, George the Poet, Craig David, Aretha Franklin, Patti LaBelle, Natalie Cole, Jake Zyrus, The Whispers, Deborah Cox, Tamia, Glennis Grace, The Game, 9th Wonder, Twista, Gudda Gudda, Lil B, Jim Jones and David Guetta among a slew of others.

== Political impact ==
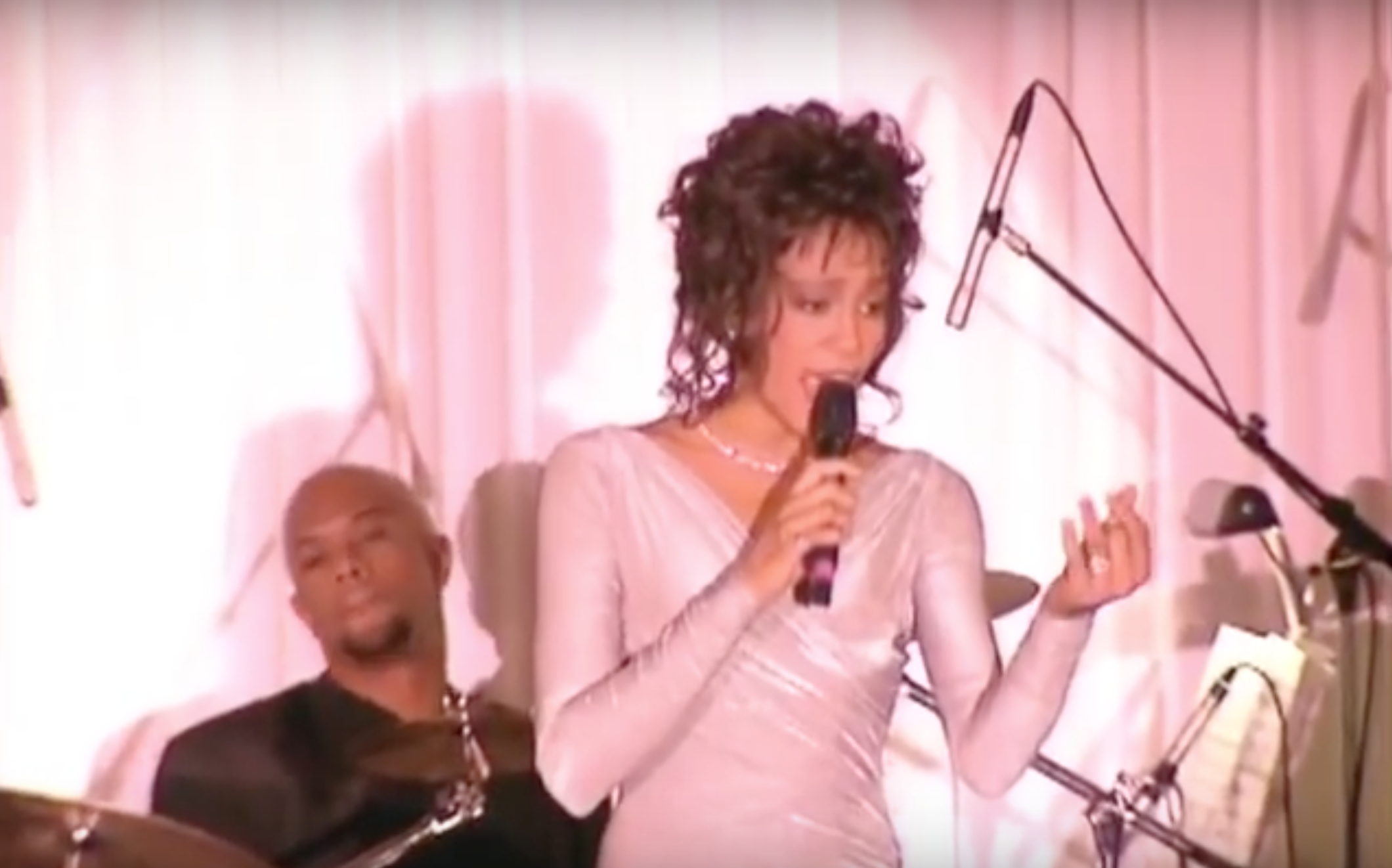
Houston performing at a state dinner in the White House honoring South African president Nelson Mandela in 1994

In January 1986, Houston was one of the main vocalists behind the song "King Holiday", alongside Stephanie Mills, El DeBarge, Teena Marie, New Edition, Menudo, Lisa Lisa, Full Force, Stacy Lattisaw and James "J.T." Taylor as part of the King Dream Chorus with the King Holiday Crew (Kurtis Blow, Run-DMC, Whodini, the Fat Boys and Melle Mel) in honor of Martin Luther King Jr. Day, which was observed as a national holiday in the United States on January 20, 1986 to commemorate the legacy of civil rights activist Martin Luther King Jr. Co-produced by King's youngest son Dexter, the song became a hit, reaching number 30 on the Hot Black Singles chart. All proceeds of the song's sales went into the King Center in Atlanta.

Some of Houston's music was praised for delivering positive social messages. Stephen Holden of The New York Times wrote of her iconic rendition of "Greatest Love of All": "Houston sings [the song] with a forceful directness that gives its message of self-worth an astounding resonance and conviction" and called the song a compelling assertion of spiritual devotion, black pride, and family loyalty, all at once. In his review of Houston's sophomore album, Whitney, Vince Aletti of Rolling Stone raved the album's fifth hit single "Love Will Save the Day" as "the only song to even remotely acknowledge the problems of the world at large." Houston's 1993 hit rendition of "I'm Every Woman" was regarded as a "feminist anthem" by several critics. In 2025, Ebony magazine mentioned the Houston rendition in their article, "The Evolution of Black Female Empowerment Anthems", writing, "[Houston] paid homage to Chaka Khan’s original version and transformed it into a soaring anthem for female solidarity." It was included alongside other black feminist anthems such as Sister Rosetta Tharpe's "Strange Things Happening Every Day", Aretha Franklin's "Respect", Janet Jackson's "Control", Lauryn Hill's "Doo Wop (That Thing)" and Destiny's Child's "Independent Women Part 1". The music video of the song featured Houston performing it with other notable female artists such as the R&B group TLC, the song's original composer Valerie Simpson, mother Cissy Houston and the song's original performer Chaka Khan along with Houston's female backup dancers. It later won the NAACP Image Award for Outstanding Music Video.

Houston showed support to Nelson Mandela and the anti-apartheid movement since the beginning of her career. She participated in the Nelson Mandela 70th Birthday Tribute concert at London's Wembley Stadium on June 11, 1988, which was watched by more than half a billion viewers and raised $1 million in charities, while also bringing awareness to apartheid. Houston had refused to work with agencies who did business with South Africa during her modeling years in the early-80s. Prince Mensah of One Ghana, One Voice honored Houston's activism against the apartheid of South Africa, writing, "Whitney Houston was one of the few African-Americans who believed in Africa long before it became fashionable in the United States. She celebrated her identity as a Black person in many ways. As a person born in segregated times, she chose a front seat role in fighting against prejudice. Some people might choose to remember only her struggles, but Africa remembers her as a sister, a queen, a trailblazer and an inspiration. She truly left indelible footprints in our lives." Mensah added Houston's refusal to book modeling and later musical appointments in the region "cemented her status as an icon among Africans, who felt she was one of the few bridges between their continent and the rest of the world." In August 1988, Houston headlined Madison Square Garden for a United Negro College Fund benefit concert to raise money to fund historically black colleges and universities, raising a quarter of a million dollars. Houston later received the Frederick D. Patterson Award for her advocacy for black colleges and universities in March 1990. In May of that same year, Houston was named a "Point of Light Contributing Leader" and applauded by President Bush at The White House for her social consciousness. She and her mom Cissy (and brothers Michael and Gary) visited The White House and were given a private tour.

During the Persian Gulf War, on January 27, 1991, Houston performed "The Star-Spangled Banner", the US national anthem, at Super Bowl XXV at Tampa Stadium. She donated all of the earnings from the performance sales to Gulf War servicemen and their families. The record label followed suit and she was voted to the American Red Cross Board of Directors as a result. Following the terrorist attacks in 2001, Houston re-released "The Star-Spangled Banner" to support the New York Firefighters 9/11 Disaster Relief Fund and the New York Fraternal Order of Police. She waived her royalty rights to the song, which reached number one on charts in October 2001 and generated more than $1 million. Cinque Henderson wrote in a 2016 article about Houston's Super Bowl performance in The New Yorker that Houston's rendition of the song was "the most influential performance of a national song since Marian Anderson sang “My Country, ’Tis of Thee” on the steps of the Lincoln Memorial on the eve of the Second World War." Henderson further added that Houston's re-arrangement of the song helped to change African Americans' often-negative feelings about the national anthem, writing, "By making the idea of freedom the emotional and structural high point (not just the high note) of the anthem, Houston unlocked that iron door for black people and helped make the song a part of our cultural patrimony, too." Henderson explained that Houston's version "wasn't just a revolution in music; it was a revolution in meaning." Writer Daphne A. Brooks wrote in her 2012 obituary on Houston for The Nation of her iconic performance of the Star Spangled Banner that by "not just hitting that note but living in it and by finally and absolutely killing it, Whitney Houston – a black woman born just weeks before the March on Washington, raised by pioneering artists like mother Cissy, cousin Dionne and godmother Aretha – willed herself into America's narrative of freedom and democracy through the sheer crushing command of her voice. That day, she staged a struggle on the battlefield of song and cemented her title as the voice of the post-civil rights era."

Later after her Super Bowl performance in 1991, Houston put together her Welcome Home Heroes concert with HBO for the soldiers fighting in the Persian Gulf War and their families. The free concert took place at Naval Station Norfolk in Norfolk, Virginia in front of 3,500 servicemen and women. HBO descrambled the concert so that it was free for everyone to watch. The show gave HBO its highest ratings ever.

In October 1994, Houston attended and performed at a state dinner in the White House honoring newly elected South African president Nelson Mandela. At the end of her world tour, Houston performed three concerts in South Africa to honor President Mandela, playing to more than 200,000 people; this made her the first major musician to visit the newly unified and apartheid free nation following Mandela's winning election. Portions of Whitney: The Concert for a New South Africa were broadcast live on HBO with funds of the concerts being donated to various charities in South Africa. Houston's Whitney Houston Foundation for Children organization was awarded a VH1 Honor for all the charitable work in June 1995. Later in 1996, Houston did a private gig, for the wedding of Princess Rashidah, the eldest daughter of the Sultan of Brunei, Hassanal Bolkiah, at Jerudong Park Garden on August 24, 1996. She was reportedly paid $7 million to perform for this event. Media stories on the Brunei royal family indicated that Prince Jefri gave Houston a blank check for the event and instructed her to fill it out for what she felt she was worth.

Proceeds of Houston's two one woman show sold-out concerts at the DAR Constitution Hall in Washington, D.C. for her Classic Whitney: Live from Washington, D.C., taped live in October 1997, went to Marian Wright Edelman's Children's Defense Fund and were commemorated on the 100th anniversary of operatic singer Marian Anderson's birthday; significant due to Anderson famously being denied a concert there by the Daughters of the American Revolution. Houston's shows eventually raised $300,000 for the Children's Defense Fund.

According to her friend, New Hope Baptist Church minister Reverend DeForest Soaries, Houston "inherited from both of her parents a keen but little known interest in, and passion for, issues, projects and people that improved the plight of blacks and other disadvantaged populations." Continued Soaries: "Whenever we spoke over the years, Whitney always took an interest in discussing whatever community project I was working on and she herself was determined to make a difference in people’s lives. She supported many local groups financially– almost always anonymously. She also gave help to some local politicians."

Osama Bin Laden was reportedly a fan of Whitney Houston despite his opposition to music. He reportedly wanted to make her one of his wives.

Songfacts claimed in 2002, as the United States prepared to go to war with Iraq, Saddam Hussein had the Houston rendition of "I Will Always Love You" covered by an Iraq-based vocalist during his re-election campaign. As a result, Houston's record label filed a complaint to the Iraqi mission in the United Nations.

After Houston's sudden death in 2012, The White House issued a statement, stating that President Obama was "deeply concerned" by the news and that "it's a tragedy to lose somebody so talented at such a young age". New Jersey Governor Chris Christie ordered all New Jersey state flags to be flown at half-staff on February 18 to honor Houston. Cory Booker, then mayor of Newark, New Jersey, stated that "Houston went from a Newark church to the global stage, but she always remained a deep part of the city's pride and collective heart." In 2017, Houston's rendition of "I'm Every Woman" took on some political significance when it was played during the San Jose Women's March on January 21, 2017, with over 25,000 female protesters marching during the demonstration following the election of Donald Trump. The Kygo and Houston rendition of "Higher Love" was played immediately following Joe Biden's victory speech after his election as the 46th President of the United States on November 7, 2020. Writing for Billboard, Katie Bain described the song's use in a political setting: "Indeed, after Biden shared his vision of 'a nation united, a nation strengthened. A nation healed, 'Higher Love' backed up the message, particularly for those who know all the words ... Few sentiments could so effectively summarize the weary travails of the American collective consciousness during the past four years." In 2021, President Donald Trump issued an amended executive order to induct Houston into the National Garden of American Heroes monument project; in 2025, he reiterated his plans to plan the garden to include Houston; the project is set to be implemented in 2026. In December 2023, the New Jersey Hall of Fame unveiled the Whitney Houston Service Area, formerly known as the Vauxhal Service Area at the Garden State Parkway. The New Jersey Hall of Fame explained that the renaming was part of their "ongoing program to honor its inductees by renaming Garden State Parkway service areas after them, and building displays about them". Following the aftermath of the Palisades Fire in January 2025, the firefighters who battled the destructive wildfire were acknowledged at the 67th Annual Grammy Awards in which while being given a standing ovation by the audience of celebrities and Grammy winners and nominees, Houston's 1991 rendition of Ray Charles's "America the Beautiful" was playing in the background.

== Press and media ==
=== Recognition ===
Houston has been ranked and featured on various lists of the greatest singers of all time. In 2013, ABC named Houston the greatest woman in music. She was placed at number three on VH1's list of "50 Greatest Women of the Video Era". She was also ranked as one of the "Top 100 Greatest Artists of All Time", "Top 100 Greatest Women of Rock & Roll" and “Top 200 Greatest Cultural Icons of All Time” by VH1. Houston's entrance into the music industry is considered one of the 25 musical milestones of the last 25 years, according to USA Today in 2007. It stated that she paved the way for Mariah Carey's chart-topping vocal gymnastics. In 2024, she was ranked as the best female vocalist of all time by Smooth Radio. Many major publications including the Rock and Roll Hall of Fame, Fox News, NBC News and The Independent dubbed Houston the “greatest singer of her generation”. In 2025, Forbes named Houston the top black female vocalist, the number one female singer of the 80s and third of the 90s. In 2026, the online publication Consequence ranked her the third best vocalist of all time behind only Aretha Franklin and Queen lead singer Freddie Mercury.

VH1 listed her 1991 "The Star-Spangled Banner" performance at the Super Bowl as one of the greatest moments that rocked TV. She performed before 73,813 fans, 115 million viewers in the United States and a worldwide television audience of 750 million. The performance has often been compared to Elvis Presley's landmark trio of shows on the Ed Sullivan Show in 1956, stating the performance was "as influential a moment in television history" as Presley's performances. Her ''Concert for a New South Africa'' in 1994 was considered the nation's "biggest media event since the inauguration of Nelson Mandela". During the 1994 FIFA World Cup Final, Houston arrived on the playing field with the legendary Brazilian soccer player Pelé and performed six songs for 25 minutes with support from several thousand dancers, flag bearers, and musicians during closing ceremony before the final game, Brazil vs. Italy; with over 2 billion viewers during her performance.

=== Tabloid ===
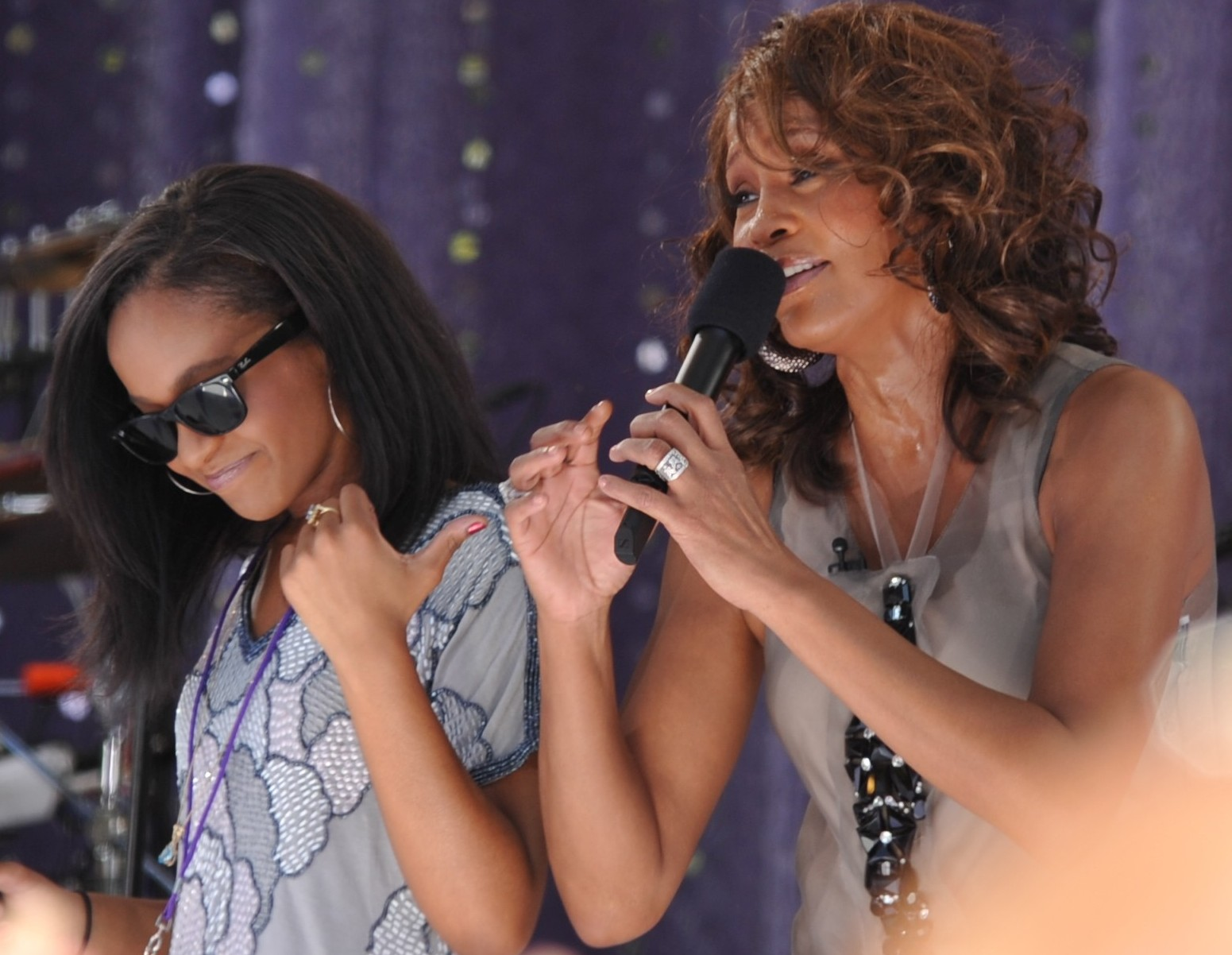
The personal life of Houston and her family members received extensive media coverage

Besides the widely recognition of her talent, Houston's private life and that of her family members have been the subjects of media and tabloid coverage.

Almost immediately after Houston achieved her first hit single with "You Give Good Love", the singer's personal life hit gossip columns. Rumors of her intimate relationship with her best friend and personal assistant Robyn Crawford began hitting the press after Houston wanted to fly Crawford to join her at a black radio convention in 1985, which caught the attention of radio disk jockeys and tabloid newspapers alike. Houston and Crawford often shared the same hotel room and when Houston moved to bigger residences, Crawford accompanied her. As Houston's fame grew, her father advised the pair to stay apart from each other during public appearances and date men to avoid suspicion. The singer constantly denied reports of a romance with Crawford during her first fifteen years in the spotlight and denied gay and lesbian rumors about herself.

During the late 1980s, tabloids published claims that Houston was involved in a love triangle between actresses Jodie Foster and Kelly McGillis, with Houston allegedly stopping by a movie set to fight McGillis over their alleged involvement with Foster. Neither Houston nor Foster addressed these claims but in 2009, McGillis, who came out as lesbian that same year, denied the rumors and admitted she never even met Houston. In 2006, Houston's sister-in-law Tina Brown told the National Enquirer that the singer was involved in "steamy same-sex affairs" with multiple women during the later years of her marriage to her brother Bobby Brown, even claiming she once caught the singer half-dressed with a woman while visiting the home Houston shared with her husband.

Even after her death, the singer's sexuality and sexual identity continues to be a heavily debated topic with some consensus among her friends and family that she was either bisexual or at the least, "sexually fluid".

In 1993, tabloids reported that Houston had overdosed on diet pills in an attempt to lose the weight she gained following her pregnancy and birth of Bobbi Kristina Brown, to which Houston through her lawyer denied the story as "completely wrong - not accurate - completely out of whack. None of this has happened."

In the 2000s, her drug use, the tumultuous marriage to singer Bobby Brown and family controversies often overshadowed her acting and singing career. In September 2001, Houston's extremely thin appearance at Michael Jackson: 30th Anniversary Special led to rumors about her health. In 2002, Houston became embroiled in an widespread media covered legal dispute with John Houston Enterprise, a company started by her father. The company, run by Kevin Skinner, sued her for $100 million, claiming unpaid compensation. Houston's father died in February 2003, and the lawsuit was dismissed in April 2004, with no compensation awarded.

Houston occasionally addressed the tabloid media in her music. In 1998, she recorded the song "In My Business" for the album, My Love Is Your Love, collaborating with rap artist Missy Elliott, while a gender-swapped remake of Stevie Wonder's "I Was Made to Love Him" from the same album called out the media for their "disapproval" of her marriage to Bobby Brown. Four years later, in 2002, Houston co-penned the anti-tabloid diss track "Whatchulookinat", in which Houston called out tabloid press for invading her privacy, "messing with [her] reputation" and "tryna dirty up [her] name". The song and her music video to her 2003 hit "Try It on My Own" addressed her 2000 Academy Award rehearsal incident in which the singer was replaced from a medley performance for singing a different song than what Burt Bacharach requested.

During the promotion for her 2002 album Just Whitney, Houston gave an infamous interview with Diane Sawyer. During the interview, she addressed rumors of drug use, famously saying, "crack is wack". She admitted to using various substances but denied having an eating disorder.

The 2005 reality show Being Bobby Brown drew criticism for what critics perceived to be unflattering moments from Houston and Bobby Brown, but still achieved high ratings. However, the show was not renewed for a second season after Houston declined further participation. In September 2006, a year after Being Bobby Brown aired, Houston filed for legal separation from Brown, later filing for divorce the following month, citing irreconcilable differences. The divorce was granted on April 24, 2007.

=== Death news coverage ===
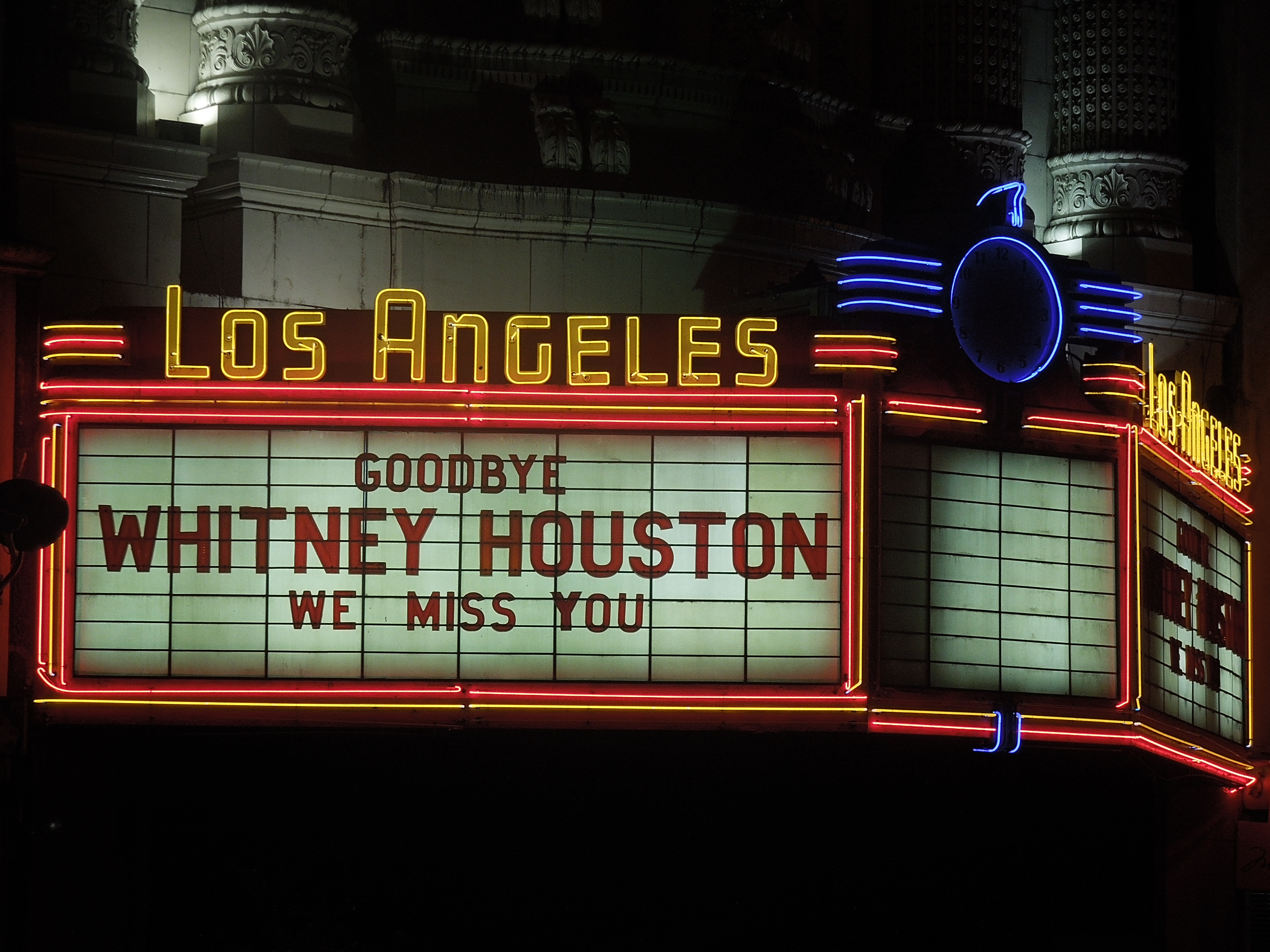
A "We miss you" message displayed for Houston at the Los Angeles Theatre following her death, February 11, 2012.

When Houston died at the age of 48 on the eve of the 2012 Grammy Awards, the global media gave extensive news coverage for weeks.

ABC, CBS, NBC, CNN, MSNBC, Fox News, BBC News, and Sky News interrupted their programming to cover Houston's death, featuring interviews with those who knew her. Saturday Night Live displayed a photo of a smiling Houston from her 1996 appearance. MTV and VH1 aired many of her classic videos with news segments and celebrity reactions. Her memorial service was televised globally.

At the 54th Grammy Awards, the anticipation for the show's tributes to Houston greatly helped increased the ratings, which became the second highest in its history with 39.9 million viewers (trailing only behind the 1984 Grammys with 51.67 million viewers). The rating was 50% higher than in 2011. This remains the highest-rated Grammy telecast on 21st-century U.S. television.

Coverage of Houston's death was ranked as the most memorable entertainment event in television history by a study from Sony Electronics and Nielsen Media Research. The first hour after the news of her death saw 2,481,652 X (formerly Twitter) posts (18% of all tweets) and all of the trending topics mentioned Houston. Within 24 hours it had reached 35 million tweets (52 million in 2026), making it the most-tweeted breaking-news event in the history of X (formerly Twitter). Her death also brought 1,532,302 hits per hour to her Wikipedia article, the highest peak traffic on any article since at least January 2010. Houston topped the list of Google searches in 2012, both globally and in the United States, according to Google's Annual Zeitgeist most-popular searches list.

Houston's funeral was televised and reportedly drew millions. It was reported by Adweek that Houston's funeral was viewed by over nine million viewers across all cable news networks in the US alone. Because Saturday viewerships are "usually slow", Houston's funeral set records for Saturday cable TV viewership.

According to CNN stats, the funeral was watched by over 5.4 million viewers on the channel. 1.42 and 1.38 million viewers respectively watched the proceedings on HLN and Fox News, while over 709,000 viewers watched on MSNBC.

The funeral was also streamed on the Associated Press, which reported that the live stream accumulated 7.3 million streams and had two million unique visitors during the funeral, surpassing the all-time AP Live streams from the British royal wedding of Prince William and Kate Middleton.

The death of Houston and Brown's only child, Bobbi Kristina Brown, 3 years later in 2015, was also covered internationally.

=== Documentaries and specials ===
Her life, career and death have been the subject of many documentaries and specials. On November 16, 2012, CBS aired We Will Always Love You: A Grammy Salute to Whitney Houston, nine months after Houston's death. Among the singers that took part in the Houston tribute were singers Celine Dion, CeCe Winans, Yolanda Adams, Usher and Jennifer Hudson. A television documentary film entitled Whitney: Can I Be Me aired on Showtime on August 25, 2017. The film was directed by Nick Broomfield.

On April 27, 2016, it was announced that Kevin Macdonald would work with the film production team Altitude, producers of the Amy Winehouse documentary film Amy (2015), on a new documentary film based on Houston's life and death. It is the first documentary authorized by Houston's estate. That film, entitled Whitney, premiered at the 2018 Cannes Film Festival and was released internationally in theaters on July 6, 2018.

Lifetime released the documentary Whitney Houston & Bobbi Kristina: Didn't We Almost Have It All in 2021, which The Atlanta Journal-Constitution called "...less an exposé and more a loving tribute to these two women". On the tenth anniversary of her death, ESPN ran a 30-minute documentary of Houston's acclaimed performance of The Star Spangled Banner at Super Bowl XXV in 1991 titled Whitney's Anthem. In 2015, Lifetime premiered the biographical film Whitney, which mentions that Whitney Houston was named after prominent television actress Whitney Blake, the mother of Meredith Baxter, star of the television series Family Ties. The film was directed by Houston's Waiting to Exhale co-star Angela Bassett, and Houston was portrayed by model Yaya DaCosta.

In April 2020, it was announced that a biopic based on Houston's life, said to be "no holds barred", titled I Wanna Dance with Somebody, would be produced, with Bohemian Rhapsody screenwriter Anthony McCarten writing the script and director Kasi Lemmons at the helm. Clive Davis, the Houston estate and Primary Wave were behind the biopic, with Sony Pictures & TriStar Pictures. On December 15, 2020, it was announced that actress Naomi Ackie had been picked to portray Houston. The film opened on December 23, 2022, and grossed around $60 million, becoming one of the highest grossing biopics based on a historical African American female figure after the Tina Turner biopic, What's Love Got to Do with It.

Each actress listed portrays Houston:

- Whitney – Yaya DaCosta, 2015
- Bobbi Kristina – Demetria McKinney, 2017
- The Bobby Brown Story – Gabrielle Dennis, 2018
- Selena: The Series – Shauntè Massard, 2021 (S2, E6)
- I Wanna Dance with Somebody – Naomi Ackie, 2022
