= Whitney Houston filmography =

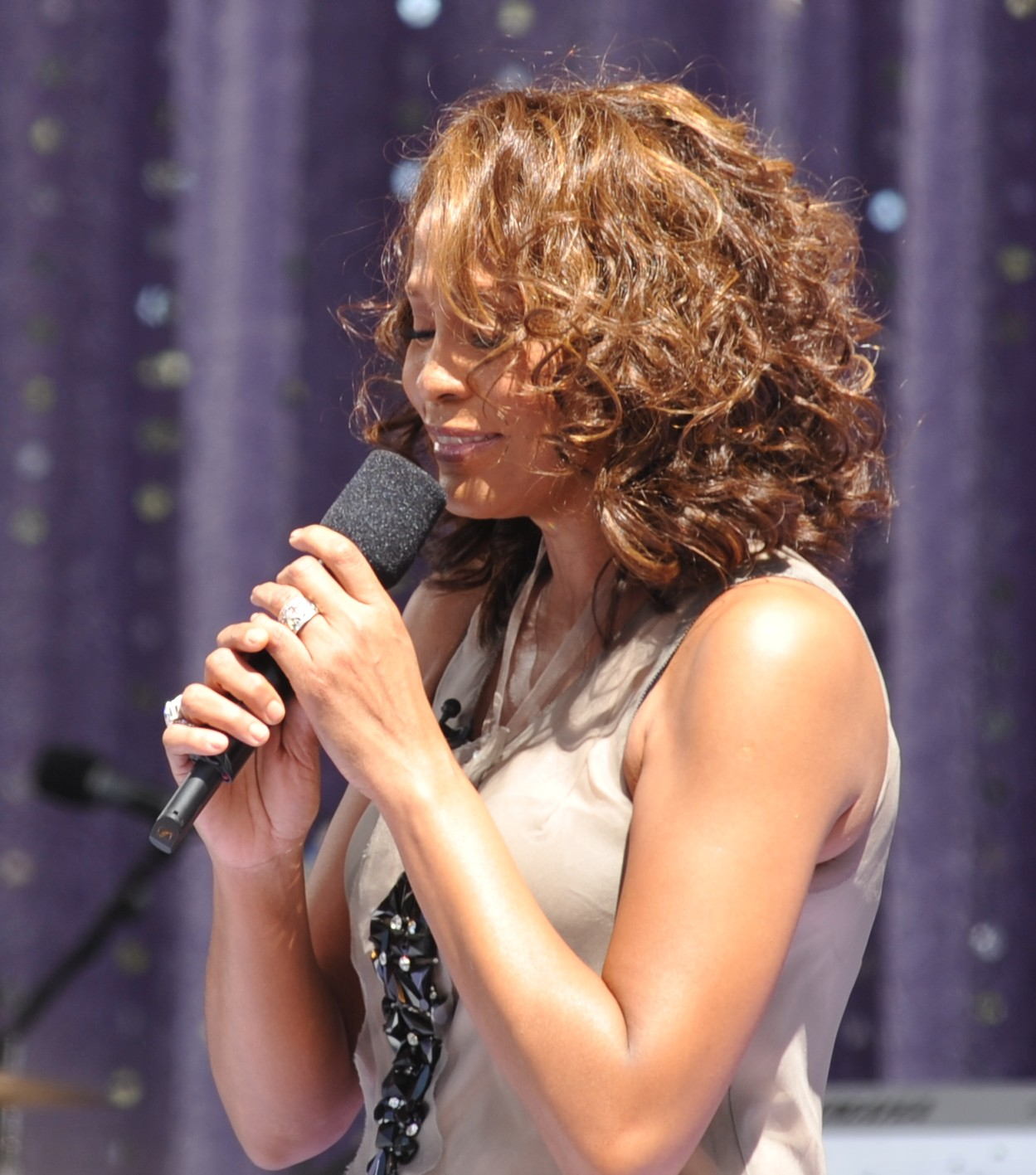
Whitney Houston performing

American entertainer Whitney Houston worked in nine feature films, three television films, and seven television episodes, and appeared in seventeen commercials. A Hollywood crossover icon, she is one of the most significant cultural figures of the 20th century.

She made her screen acting debut as Rachel Marron in the romantic thriller film The Bodyguard (1992). Despite mixed reviews from film critics, it was the second-highest-grossing film worldwide in 1992, making $411 million worldwide. The soundtrack became the best-selling soundtrack of all time, selling more than 45 million copies worldwide.

In 1995, Houston starred alongside Angela Bassett, Loretta Devine, and Lela Rochon in her second film, Waiting to Exhale (1995), which was notable for having an all-African-American cast, and was called by The Los Angeles Times a "social phenomenon". Upon release, the film received mixed reviews from critics. Waiting to Exhale was a financial success, grossing $14.1 million in its first weekend of release. In total, the film grossed $67.05 million in North America, and $14.4 million internationally, for a total worldwide gross of $81.45 million, making it the 26th highest-grossing film of 1995. The soundtrack to the film, which has sold over twelve million copies worldwide, also featured exclusively female African-American artists, and, at the 39th Grammy Awards in 1997, received a total of eleven nominations including Album of the Year, Song of the Year for "Exhale (Shoop Shoop)" and three Best Female R&B Vocal Performance nominees, then won Best R&B Song for "Exhale (Shoop Shoop)".

In 1996, Houston starred in the holiday comedy The Preacher's Wife, with Denzel Washington. Houston earned $10 million for the role, making her one of the highest-paid actresses in Hollywood at the time and the highest-earning African-American actress in Hollywood. The movie was a moderate success, earning approximately $57 million at the box offices. It was nominated for five Image Awards, including Outstanding Motion Picture, and won two—for Best Actress (Whitney Houston) and Best Supporting Actress (Loretta Devine). It was nominated for the Academy Award for Best Music, Original Musical or Comedy Score. The Preacher's Wife: Original Soundtrack Album is the best-selling gospel album of all time. The soundtrack also remained at number one for a record twenty-six weeks on the Billboard Top Gospel Albums Chart.

During her 20-year film career, Houston received several acting nominations for all four of her feature film roles. For her role in The Bodyguard, later listed by Billboard, as one of the "100 best acting performances by [a] musician in a film", Houston received the People's Choice Awards nomination for Favorite Leading Actress in a Dramatic Motion Picture, the MTV Movie Awards nominations for Best Female Actress and Best Breakthrough Performance and the NAACP Image Award nomination for Outstanding Actress. For Waiting to Exhale, she received a second consecutive NAACP Image Award nomination for Outstanding Actress. For her role in The Preacher's Wife, Houston won the NAACP Image Award for Outstanding Actress.

As a film producer, she produced hit series such as The Princess Diaries, The Cheetah Girls and multicultural movies like Cinderella (1997) and Sparkle (2012). Houston is considered by some as one of the "greatest singers-turned-actors of all time". Houston was cited as one of three female performers to achieve similar levels of success in music and film along with Barbra Streisand and Jennifer Lopez.

== Feature films ==
Title	Year	Credit(s)	Role	Director(s)	World box office
The Bodyguard	1992	Actress	Rachel Marron	Mick Jackson	$411,000,000
Waiting to Exhale	1995	Actress	Savannah Jackson	Forest Whitaker	$82,000,000
The Preacher's Wife	1996	Actress	Julia Coleman-Biggs	Penny Marshall	$57,000,000
The Princess Diaries	2001	Producer	—N/a	Garry Marshall	$165,300,000
Nora's Hair Salon	2004	Uncredited Cameo	Herself	Jerry Lamothe	—N/a
The Princess Diaries 2: Royal Engagement	2004	Producer	—N/a	Garry Marshall	$134,700,000
The Last Days of Left Eye	2007	Documentary cameo	Herself	Lauren Lazin	—N/a
Michael Jackson: The Life of an Icon	2011	Documentary cameo	Herself	Andrew Eastel	—N/a
Sparkle	2012	Actress; executive producer	Emma Anderson	Salim Akil	$24,700,000
Whitney: Can I Be Me	2017	Documentary subject	Herself	Nick Broomfield; Rudi Dolezal	—N/a
Whitney	2018	Documentary film	Herself	Kevin Macdonald	$5,000,000

== Television ==
Title	Year	Episode	Credit(s)	Role	Creator(s)/Director(s)
Gimme a Break!	1984	"Katie's College"	Actress	Rita Lammar	Hal Cooper
As the World Turns	1984	"Cinderella's Concert"	Actress	Herself	Irna Phillips
Silver Spoons	1985	"Head Over Heels"	Actress	Herself	Jack Shea
Saturday Night Live	1991	"Alec Baldwin/Whitney Houston"	Actress	Herself	Dave Wilson
Saturday Night Live	1996	"Rosie O'Donnell/Whitney Houston"	Actress	Herself	Beth McCarthy-Miller
Rodgers and Hammerstein's Cinderella	1997	Television film	Actress; executive producer	Fairy Godmother	Robert Iscove
Boston Public	2003	"Chapter 66"	Actress	Herself	Jonathan Pontell
The Cheetah Girls	2003	Television film	Producer	—N/a	Oz Scott
Being Bobby Brown	2005	Reality television series	Reality show subject	Herself	—N/a
The Cheetah Girls 2	2006	Television film	Co-executive producer	—N/a	Kenny Ortega
The X Factor	2009	"Week 2"	Guest mentor	Herself	Phil Heyes
Whitney at the BBC	2021	Music Show	A collection of some her biggest hits performed at the BBC.	Herself	

== Commercials ==
Year	Company	Promoting	Country	Notes
1983	Dr Pepper/Seven Up	Canada Dry (soft drink beverage)	United States	Houston appeared in this commercial before debut as a professional singer and sang the praises of sugar-free Canada Dry Ginger Ale.
1986	Coca-Cola	Diet Coke (soft drink beverage)	United States	Houston sang its theme song, "Just for the taste of it".
1988	Coca-Cola	Diet Coke (soft drink beverage)	United States	Houston sang the other version of its advertising slogan at the time, "Just for the taste of it".; Outside the United States, the second version of advertising was released, in which "Greatest Love of All" was used as background music.; 1989 MTV Video of the Year winning "This Note's for You" by Neil Young, parodied parts of this advertising to criticize pop/rock stars who make commercial endorsements, most notably Michael Jackson for Pepsi and Houston for Diet Coke, using look-alikes for them.
1989	Sanyo	Electronics (the stereo, TV)	Japan	Houston was featured on print advertisements and sang the theme song for TV commercial, "Takin' a Chance", produced by Keith Thomas. It was released as a CD single in Japan and included in Japanese edition of I'm Your Baby Tonight.; Sanyo also sponsored Houston's 1990 Japan only Feels So Right Tour.
1994–1995	AT&T	Telephone services	United States	Houston sang its theme song, "True Voice".
1999	Nissin	Consumer credit business	Japan	Houston appeared on both print advertisement and TV commercial for Nissin, a nonbank finance company that lends to consumers and small businesses in Japan, with then the company's slogan "Make it happen with Nissin"
