= An Evening with Whitney: The Whitney Houston Hologram Tour =

2020–23 concert tour by Whitney Houston

An Evening with Whitney
- Posthumous tour by Whitney Houston
- Promotional poster for the tour
- Location: Europe • North America
- Start date: February 25, 2020
- End date: May 31, 2022
- Legs: 1
- No. of shows: 12 in Europe; 42 in North America; 54 in total
- Website: aneveningwithwhitney.com

Whitney Houston concert chronology
- Nothing but Love World Tour (2009–10); An Evening with Whitney (2020–22)

An Evening with Whitney: The Whitney Houston Hologram Tour was a posthumous concert tour featuring a projected image of American singer Whitney Houston. The tour began in Europe on February 25, 2020, and ended after a residency in Las Vegas on May 31, 2022.

== Background ==
Base Hologram and the Estate of Whitney E. Houston announced that the production will reunite audiences with Houston, using state of the art technology to create a live theatrical concert. It will not be using Pepper's ghost, in which a 2D image is projected on plexiglass and then reflected onto an LED screen. Rather, the specters are projected in front of a translucent screen. The show will be creatively directed and choreographed by Fatima Robinson, and will feature dancers, singers and a live band. The show is set to feature Houston's most iconic hits, including "I Will Always Love You", "I Wanna Dance with Somebody (Who Loves Me)", "My Love Is Your Love", and the 2019 Kygo produced worldwide hit single, a cover of Steve Winwood's "Higher Love".

Speaking on the tour, Pat Houston, president of the Estate stated:

"Whitney is not with us, but her music will live with us forever. We know we made the right decision partnering with BASE because they understand how important it is to produce a phenomenal hologram. They also know that engaging her fans with an authentic Whitney experience would resonate worldwide because of the iconic status that she created over three decades. Her fans deserve nothing less because she gave nothing less than her best."

Late February 2020, it was announced the show would head to North America, first stopping in Las Vegas. A few weeks later it was revealed the image would have a Vegas residency at the Flamingo Hotel.

== Opening act ==
- Rob Green (United Kingdom and Ireland)

== Setlist ==
The following set list as listed in the tour program

1. "Higher Love"
2. "Saving All My Love for You"
3. "All the Man That I Need"
4. "I Have Nothing"
5. "I Wanna Dance with Somebody (Who Loves Me)"
6. "It's Not Right but It's Okay"
7. "I Believe in You and Me"
8. "Run to You"
9. "Step by Step"
10. "How Will I Know"
11. "My Love Is Your Love"
12. "Greatest Love of All"
13. "Exhale (Shoop Shoop)"
14. "I Will Always Love You"
  Encore
15. "Dance Sequence" (contains elements of "Queen of the Night")
16. "I'm Every Woman"

== Tour dates ==
Date	City	Country	Venue
Europe
February 25, 2020	Sheffield	England	Irwin Mitchell Oval Hall
February 27, 2020	Liverpool	England	M&S Bank Arena
February 28, 2020	Manchester	England	O_{2} Apollo
February 29, 2020	Leeds	England	First Direct Arena
March 1, 2020	Glasgow	England	SEC Armadillo
March 3, 2020	Dublin	Ireland	Bord Gáis Energy Theatre
March 4, 2020	Birmingham	England	Arena Birmingham
March 5, 2020	Bournemouth	England	Windsor Hall
March 6, 2020	Cardiff	England	Motorpoint Arena
March 7, 2020	Brighton	England	Brighton Centre
March 9, 2020	Nottingham	England	Royal Concert Hall
March 10, 2020	London	England	Eventim Apollo
North America
October 26, 2021	Las Vegas	United States	Harrah's Showroom
April 7, 2022	Las Vegas	United States	Harrah's Showroom
April 8, 2022	Las Vegas	United States	Harrah's Showroom
April 9, 2022	Las Vegas	United States	Harrah's Showroom
April 10, 2022	Las Vegas	United States	Harrah's Showroom
April 12, 2022	Las Vegas	United States	Harrah's Showroom
April 13, 2022	Las Vegas	United States	Harrah's Showroom
April 14, 2022	Las Vegas	United States	Harrah's Showroom
April 15, 2022	Las Vegas	United States	Harrah's Showroom
April 16, 2022	Las Vegas	United States	Harrah's Showroom
April 17, 2022	Las Vegas	United States	Harrah's Showroom
April 19, 2022	Las Vegas	United States	Harrah's Showroom
April 20, 2022	Las Vegas	United States	Harrah's Showroom
April 21, 2022	Las Vegas	United States	Harrah's Showroom
April 22, 2022	Las Vegas	United States	Harrah's Showroom
April 23, 2022	Las Vegas	United States	Harrah's Showroom
April 24, 2022	Las Vegas	United States	Harrah's Showroom
April 26, 2022	Las Vegas	United States	Harrah's Showroom
April 27, 2022	Las Vegas	United States	Harrah's Showroom
April 28, 2022	Las Vegas	United States	Harrah's Showroom
April 29, 2022	Las Vegas	United States	Harrah's Showroom
April 30, 2022	Las Vegas	United States	Harrah's Showroom
May 1, 2022	Las Vegas	United States	Harrah's Showroom
May 3, 2022	Las Vegas	United States	Harrah's Showroom
May 4, 2022	Las Vegas	United States	Harrah's Showroom
May 5, 2022	Las Vegas	United States	Harrah's Showroom
May 6, 2022	Las Vegas	United States	Harrah's Showroom
May 7, 2022	Las Vegas	United States	Harrah's Showroom
May 8, 2022	Las Vegas	United States	Harrah's Showroom
May 10, 2022	Las Vegas	United States	Harrah's Showroom
May 11, 2022	Las Vegas	United States	Harrah's Showroom
May 12, 2022	Las Vegas	United States	Harrah's Showroom
May 13, 2022	Las Vegas	United States	Harrah's Showroom
May 14, 2022	Las Vegas	United States	Harrah's Showroom
May 15, 2022	Las Vegas	United States	Harrah's Showroom
May 24, 2022	Las Vegas	United States	Harrah's Showroom
May 25, 2022	Las Vegas	United States	Harrah's Showroom
May 26, 2022	Las Vegas	United States	Harrah's Showroom
May 27, 2022	Las Vegas	United States	Harrah's Showroom
May 28, 2022	Las Vegas	United States	Harrah's Showroom
May 29, 2022	Las Vegas	United States	Harrah's Showroom
May 31, 2022	Las Vegas	United States	Harrah's Showroom

Cancellations and rescheduled shows

Date	Location	Venue	Reason
March 2, 2020	Aberdeen, Scotland	P&J Live	Cancelled
March 12, 2020	Brussels, Belgium	Henry Le Bœuf Hall	Coronavirus outbreak
March 13, 2020	Amsterdam, Netherlands	AFAS Live	Coronavirus outbreak
March 14, 2020	Ghent, Belgium	Capitole	Coronavirus outbreak
March 15, 2020	Paris, France	Salle Pleyel	Coronavirus outbreak
March 19, 2020	Zürich, Switzerland	Samsung Hall	Cancelled
March 20, 2020	Berlin, Germany	Admiralspalast	Coronavirus outbreak
March 21, 2020	Bratislava, Slovakia	Incheba Expo Arena	Coronavirus outbreak; Part of City Sounds Festival
March 22, 2020	Vienna, Austria	Stadthalle F	Coronavirus outbreak
March 23, 2020	Milan, Italy	Teatro degli Arcimboldi	Coronavirus outbreak
March 23, 2020	Bratislava, Slovakia	Incheba Expo Arena	Rescheduled to March 21, 2020
March 25, 2020	Copenhagen, Denmark	Forum Black Box	Rescheduled to March 29, 2020
March 26, 2020	Oslo, Norway	Folketeateret	Rescheduled to March 30, 2020
March 26, 2020	Prague, Czech Republic	Kongresový sál	Coronavirus outbreak
March 28, 2020	Stockholm, Sweden	Cirkus	Rescheduled to April 1, 2020
March 29, 2020	Copenhagen, Denmark	Forum Black Box	Coronavirus outbreak
March 30, 2020	Saint Petersburg, Russia	Oktyabrskiy Big Concert Hall	Cancelled
March 30, 2020	Oslo, Norway	Folketeateret	Coronavirus outbreak
March 31, 2020	Moscow, Russia	State Kremlin Palace	Cancelled
April 1, 2020	Stockholm, Sweden	Cirkus	Coronavirus outbreak
April 2, 2020	Kyiv, Ukraine	National Palace of Arts "Ukraina"	Cancelled
April 3, 2020	Minsk, Belarus	Palace of the Republic	Cancelled
