= Whitney Houston =

American singer and actress (1963–2012)

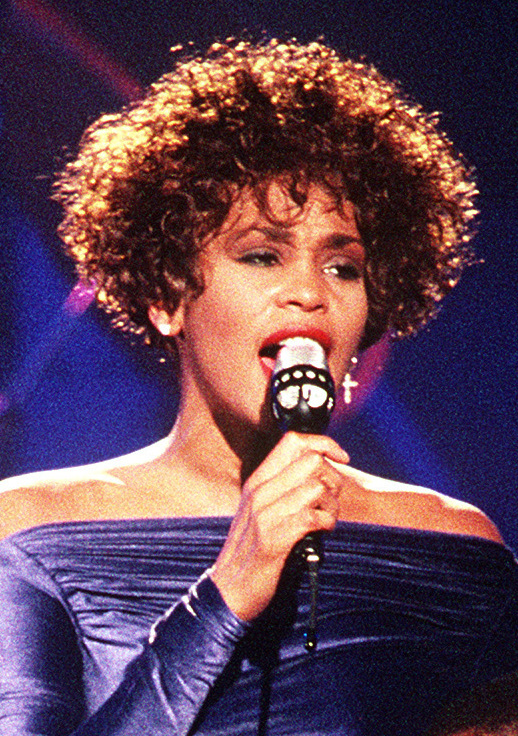
- Houston in 1991
- Born: Whitney Elizabeth Houston; August 9, 1963; Newark, New Jersey, U.S.
- Died: February 11, 2012 (aged 48); Beverly Hills, California, U.S.
- Burial place: Fairview Cemetery, Westfield, New Jersey
- Occupations: Singer; actress; film producer; record producer
- Years active: 1977–2012
- Works: Albums; singles; videography; filmography; performances; songs recorded
- Spouse: Bobby Brown (m. 1992; div. 2007)
- Children: Bobbi Kristina Brown
- Parents: John Houston (father); Cissy Houston (mother)
- Relatives: Leontyne Price (cousin); Gary Garland (half-brother); Dionne Warwick (cousin); Dee Dee Warwick (cousin); Jeremiah Burke Sanderson (great-great-grandfather)
- Awards: Full list
- Musical career
- Origin: New York City
- Genres: R&B; pop; soul; gospel; dance; funk; new jack swing
- Instrument: Vocals
- Labels: Arista; RCA
- Website: whitneyhouston.com

Whitney Elizabeth Houston (August 9, 1963 – February 11, 2012) was an American singer, actress, film producer, and record producer. Commonly referred to as "the Voice", Houston is one of the best-selling music artists of all time, with sales of more than 220 million records worldwide. She is among the most awarded entertainers of all time. A cultural icon, Houston broke down gender and racial barriers through her artistic achievements, Hollywood crossover, and music videos. Known for her vocal delivery, gospel singing style, crossover appeal, and live performances, she was ranked second on Rolling Stone's list of the greatest singers of all time in 2023.

Houston became one of the first black women to appear on the cover of Seventeen after becoming a teen model in 1981. She signed to Arista Records at the age of 19. Her first two studio albums, Whitney Houston (1985) and Whitney (1987), topped the Billboard 200 for 14 and 11 weeks, respectively. The former remains the best-selling debut album by a solo artist, while the latter made her the first woman to debut atop the US and UK charts. Houston took a more urban turn with her third album, I'm Your Baby Tonight (1990), and performed an acclaimed rendition of "The Star-Spangled Banner" at Super Bowl XXV in 1991. She then starred in the films The Bodyguard (1992), Waiting to Exhale (1995), The Preacher's Wife (1996), Cinderella (1997) and Sparkle (2012), and produced the film franchises The Princess Diaries (2001–2004) and The Cheetah Girls (2003–2006). Soundtracks of The Bodyguard and The Preacher's Wife, respectively, rank as the best-selling soundtrack album and gospel album of all time, with the former winning the Grammy Award for Album of the Year and topping the Billboard 200 for 20 weeks.

Following the success of My Love Is Your Love (1998), Houston's first studio album in eight years, she renewed her contract with Arista Records for $100 million in 2001, one of the largest recording deals of all time. However, her drug use and a tumultuous marriage to singer Bobby Brown tarnished her "America's Sweetheart" image, overshadowing her next albums, Just Whitney (2002) and One Wish: The Holiday Album (2003). After divorcing Brown, Houston returned to the top of the Billboard 200 with her final album, I Look to You (2009). On February 11, 2012, Houston accidentally drowned in a bathtub at the Beverly Hilton hotel in Beverly Hills, California, with heart disease and cocaine use as contributing factors. News of her death coincided with the 54th Annual Grammy Awards and broke Internet and television records. Houston's death was covered internationally along with her memorial service.

Houston's first two albums, along with The Bodyguard soundtrack, rank among the best-selling albums of all time and made her the first black artist to score three RIAA diamond-certified albums. "I Wanna Dance with Somebody (Who Loves Me)" and "I Will Always Love You" are among the best-selling singles ever; the latter remains the best-selling single by a woman and has been certified diamond by the RIAA. Houston scored eleven number-one singles on the Billboard Hot 100 and remains the only artist to have seven consecutive singles top the chart. She has been inducted into multiple halls and walks of fame, including the Rock and Roll Hall of Fame, the Rhythm & Blues Hall of Fame, and the Grammy Hall of Fame (twice). Guinness World Records named Houston the highest-earning posthumous female celebrity. Her assets amounted to $250 million, earned over a 25-year career. Her life and career have been the subject of multiple documentaries and television specials.

== Early life and family ==
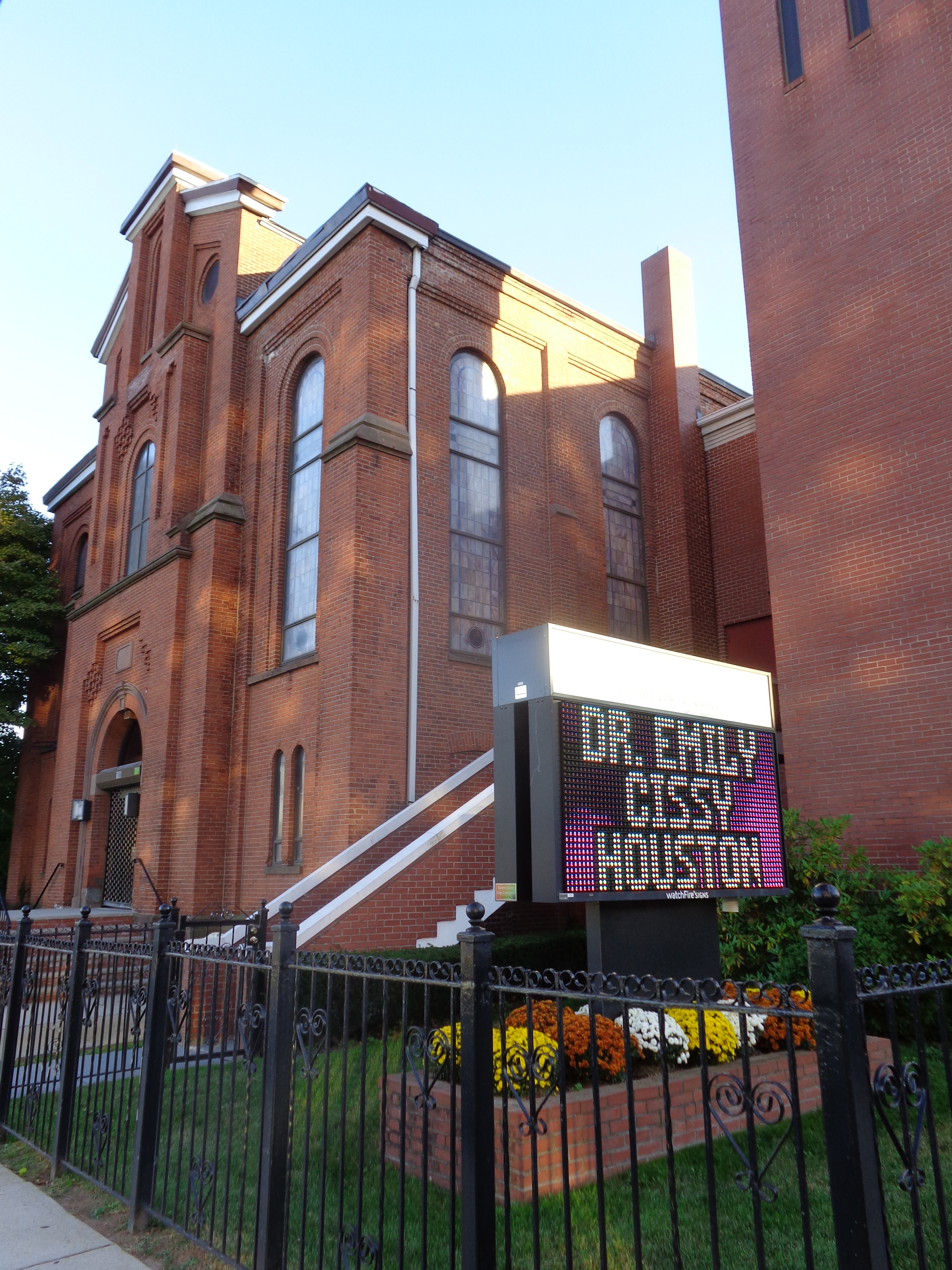
New Hope Baptist Church, where Houston sang in the choir as a child

Whitney Elizabeth Houston was born on August 9, 1963, at Presbyterian Hospital in Newark, New Jersey, to Emily "Cissy" (née Drinkard) and John Russell Houston Jr. Cissy was a Grammy-winning gospel and soul singer who was a member of The Drinkard Singers and the founder of The Sweet Inspirations before becoming a solo artist. John was a former Army serviceman who later became an administrator under Newark mayor Kenneth A. Gibson. According to her mother, Houston was named after actress Whitney Blake. Houston was given the nickname "Nippy" by her father.

Houston's parents were both African-American. Cissy Houston stated that she had partial Dutch and Native American ancestry. Houston was a cousin of singers Dionne and Dee Dee Warwick as well as a cousin of opera singer Leontyne Price. Aretha Franklin was an "honorary aunt" while Darlene Love was Houston's godmother. Houston's paternal great-great-grandfather Jeremiah Burke Sanderson was an American abolitionist and advocate for the civil and educational rights of black Americans during the mid-19th century. Houston had three older brothers: paternal half-brother John III; maternal half-brother Gary, a basketball player and singer; and full brother Michael.

At three, Houston witnessed the Newark race riots of 1967. Following Cissy signing a solo recording contract in 1970, the Houston family relocated to a suburban area of East Orange, New Jersey, called Doddtown. Prior to moving to East Orange, the Houstons had raised their children on Newark's Wainwright Street. Houston's parents married in the spring of 1964, just months before Houston's first birthday. Initially a happy union, the marriage dissolved by Houston's teen years after Houston's father suffered a near-fatal heart attack. By 18, Houston's parents separated; divorcing over a decade later.

Houston was raised in the Baptist faith. She joined the church choir at New Hope Baptist Church in Newark at the age of five, and she also learned to play piano at New Hope. She later recalled being exposed to the Pentecostal church nearby as well. Houston made her solo performance debut at New Hope singing the hymn "Guide Me O Thou Great Jehovah" at the age of 12 in November 1975. Around this same period, she told her mother that she wanted to pursue a career in music. Houston would be trained on how to sing by Cissy throughout her teen years.

Houston attended Franklin Elementary School (now the Whitney E. Houston Academy of Creative and Performing Arts) from first grade to sixth grade before transferring to Mount Saint Dominic Academy, a Catholic girls' high school in Caldwell, New Jersey, at 13. She graduated from Mount Saint Dominic in 1981.

== Career ==
=== 1977–1984: Career beginnings ===
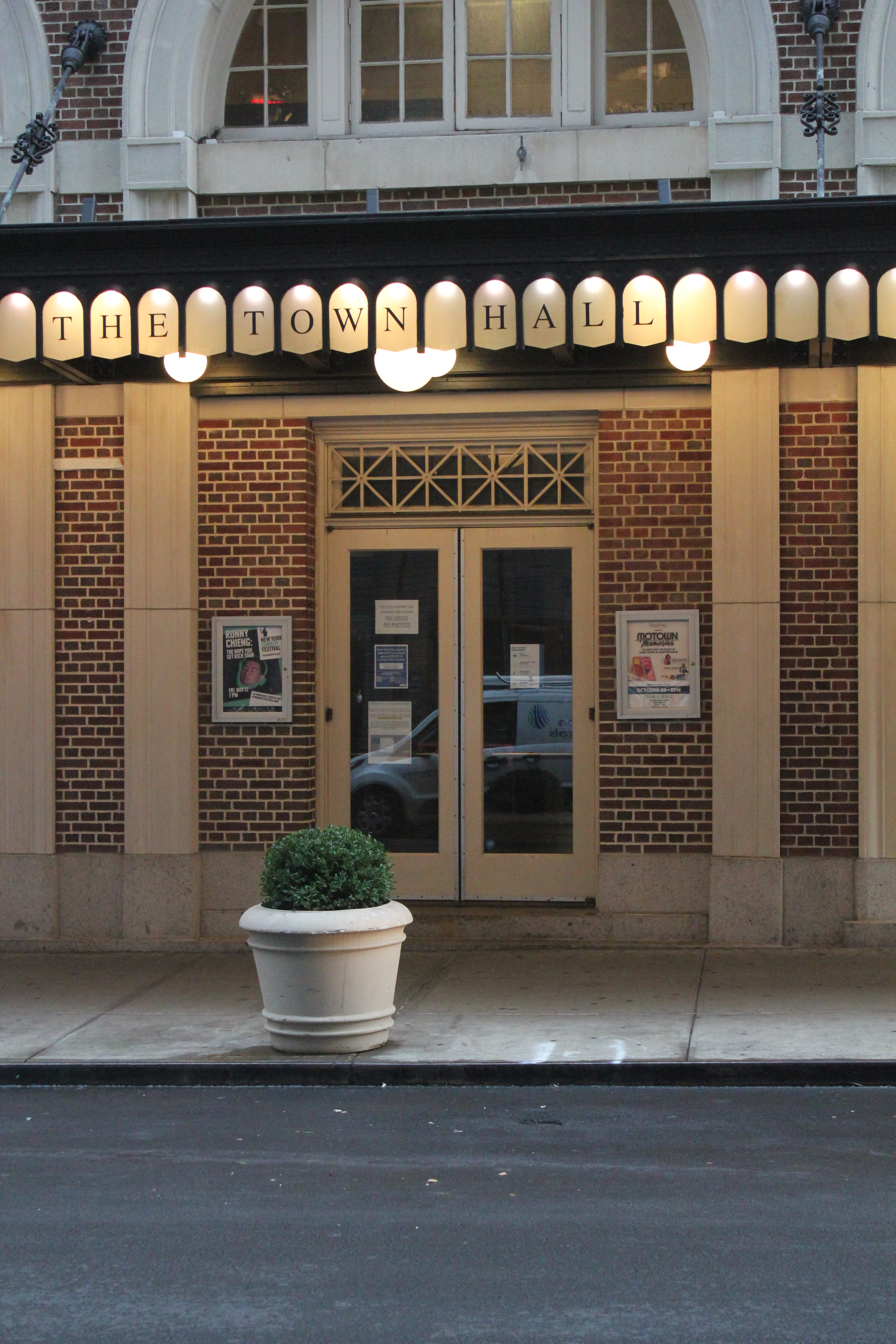
Houston gave her first public non-church performance at Manhattan's Town Hall as a teenager.

Houston's professional career began when she joined her mother's band as a background singer at fourteen while Cissy performed at Manhattan cabaret clubs. Houston gave her first solo during Cissy's performance at Manhattan's Town Hall in February 1978, performing "Tomorrow" from the Broadway musical, Annie, where she received her first standing ovation. Houston began a career as a session vocalist backing up artists like her mother, Michael Zager, the Neville Brothers, Chaka Khan and Lou Rawls. Houston was the featured vocalist in Zager's disco song "Life's a Party" (1978).

Houston became a fashion model in 1980 after being spotted at Carnegie Hall and signed first with Click Models before moving onto the Wilhelmina Models agency, where she landed the cover of Seventeen. Houston's girl next door charm helped her to land in fashion spreads for Glamour, Cosmopolitan and Young Miss. Houston continued her music career during this period, recording demos of gospel recordings. Houston's vocal talent made her sought after for recording deals, but were turned down by her mother, who insisted that Houston finish high school.

Signing with Tara Productions in September 1981, Houston hired Gene Harvey as her manager, with Daniel Gittleman and Seymour Flics also playing part in managing her. During 1982, Houston auditioned for both Elektra Records and CBS Records. Houston's feature on the song "Memories" from Material's album One Down, led to critical raves, with then-Village Voice critic Robert Christgau calling it "one of the most gorgeous ballads you've ever heard". Producer Paul Jabara later featured her on the ballad, "Eternal Love", issued off his album, Paul Jabara & Friends.

After seeing Houston perform at the Seventh Avenue South nightclub in Manhattan, Gerry Griffith—then the A&R representative for Arista Records—convinced label head Clive Davis to see her perform at the Sweetwaters nightclub the following evening. Upon viewing the performance, an impressed Davis offered Houston a recording contract. With her parents present, Houston signed on April 10, 1983.

Houston was introduced to a national audience in June 1983, performing the song "Home" from the Broadway musical The Wiz on The Merv Griffin Show. During this period, Houston almost landed a role on The Cosby Show before pulling out on the show due to her emerging career. Houston landed a cameo role on Gimme a Break!, was featured in a Canada Dry commercial and also sang commercial jingles, including one for the restaurant brand, Steak & Ale.

Houston did not begin work on an album immediately. The label wanted to make sure no other company signed her away and Davis wanted to ensure he had the right material and producers for her debut album. Some producers passed on the project because of prior commitments. After seeing her perform in New York, Michael Masser paired Houston with Teddy Pendergrass, on the duet, "Hold Me", which appeared on his album, Love Language. Released in May 1984, the song was Houston's first hit, reaching the top ten of the US R&B and adult contemporary charts. Houston also received notice in 1984 after being paired up with Jermaine Jackson, with whom the duet, "Take Good Care of My Heart", was featured on Jackson's self titled album, while also appearing with Jackson performing the song and another duet, "Nobody Loves Me Like You Do", on an episode of As the World Turns. All three songs eventually appeared on her debut album.

=== 1985–1986: Whitney Houston and rise to international prominence ===
Whitney Houston was released on Valentine's Day, February 14, 1985. The album received mixed to positive reviews in its initial run, with most of the positive remarks aimed at Houston's vocal ability. Rolling Stone called Houston "one of the most exciting new voices in years" while The New York Times called the album "an impressive, musically conservative showcase for an exceptional vocal talent". Debuting at number 166 on the Billboard 200 on March 30, 1985, the album reached the top ten 23 weeks later. It reached number one in March 1986, where it stayed for 14 weeks—the longest run of any debut album by a woman.

Whitney Houston spawned four top ten singles on the Billboard Hot 100, tying a then-record set by Cyndi Lauper and Madonna for most top ten singles off an album released by a female artist. The first single, "You Give Good Love", peaked at number three and attracted some notoriety after advice columnist Ann Landers included it in her list of rock songs deemed "trashy music" on her Ask Ann Landers column; Houston quickly addressed Landers's comments in an interview with The Chicago Tribune. The three follow-up singles "Saving All My Love for You", "How Will I Know" and "Greatest Love of All" topped the Hot 100 back-to-back, setting a new record for a female artist for most number one hits off a single album. Two days after achieving her first number one hit, Houston opened at Carnegie Hall. In addition, the ballad "All at Once" became an international hit in Europe and Japan.

A global success, Whitney Houston reached the top ten in twenty global territories, including the UK, and topped the charts in six others, including Canada and Australia. The album has since been certified Diamond in the United States for sales of 14 million copies, with over 25 million units sold worldwide, becoming the best-selling solo debut album in music history and the best-selling debut album by a female artist. The album is also listed in the Guinness World Records as the best-selling R&B studio album by a female artist in history.

In a May 25, 1986 article on The New York Times, journalist Stephen Holden declared Houston "the new queen of pop". The album's success was attributed to performances on late-night talk shows, a format not often accessible to emerging black talent at the time and exposure on music video stations, including MTV, which at the time was receiving harsh criticism for not playing enough videos from artists of color while favoring predominantly white acts. Houston stated the channel rejected the clip to "You Give Good Love" for "being a very R&B kind of song", only for them to play the clip for "Saving All My Love for You" due to the song "hit(ting) so hard and explod(ing) so heavy" that they "had no choice but to play it". In December, the video to "How Will I Know" was submitted and accepted by MTV brass and sent the video to heavy rotation almost immediately after it debuted that month and later led to Houston's music regularly being played on the channel, the first occurrence for a black female artist. The success of the "How Will I Know" video resulted in Houston winning the MTV Video Music Award for Best Female Video in September. In July 1986, her first major world tour, The Greatest Love World Tour, was launched and Houston performed on four continents for 54 shows until that December.

Houston was ranked the top new pop artist of 1985 by Billboard; the following year, her debut was the best-selling album of the year. Houston was denied a nomination for the Grammy Award for Best New Artist due to her recordings in the previous year, prompting a letter of protest from Clive Davis. The album was nominated for five Grammys, including Album of the Year. She won her first Grammy for "Saving All My Love for You" in the Best Female Pop Vocal Performance category. Later, a performance of the song at the ceremony won Houston an Emmy for Individual Performance in a Variety or Music Program. She won her first seven American Music Awards from the album, out of a record 13 nominations. Houston's debut album is listed as one of Rolling Stone's 500 Greatest Albums of All Time and on the Rock and Roll Hall of Fame's Definitive 200 list. Houston's entrance into the music industry was considered one of the 25 musical milestones of the last 25 years, according to USA Today in 2007.

=== 1987–1989: Whitney ===
Houston in 1987

Houston's second album, Whitney, was released in June 1987. Mostly produced by Narada Michael Walden, critics complained that the material was too similar to her previous album. Rolling Stone said, "the narrow channel through which this talent has been directed is frustrating". Regardless of mixed reviews, the album enjoyed commercial success. On June 27, Houston became the first woman in music history to debut at number one on the Billboard 200 with the album. Houston was also the first artist ever to enter number one in the US and UK simultaneously, while also reaching number one in every country it charted. The album stayed at number one on the Billboard 200 for its first eleven weeks and is one of five albums to spend their first ten weeks or more at number one on the chart.

The album's first single, "I Wanna Dance with Somebody (Who Loves Me)", was a global hit, selling over 18 million copies worldwide. It also became the best-selling single of the 1980's by a female artist and remains one of the best-selling singles of all time. The song peaked at number one on the Billboard Hot 100 and topped the charts in 17 countries, including Australia, West Germany and the UK. Three more singles from the album — "Didn't We Almost Have It All", "So Emotional" and "Where Do Broken Hearts Go" — reached number one on the Hot 100 within a six-month stretch. On April 23, 1988, Houston became the only artist in history to achieve seven consecutive number-one singles on the Billboard Hot 100 with "Where Do Broken Hearts Go", breaking the previous record of six held by the Beatles and the Bee Gees. Houston also broke an all-time record for most number ones recorded by a solo female artist at the time and broke her own record by producing four number one singles off the same album. When the fifth single, "Love Will Save the Day", peaked at number nine on the chart, Houston joined a small list of artists to have more than five top ten singles off an album. Whitney has sold more than 20 million copies worldwide, with ten million sold in the United States alone, where it has been certified Diamond.

Whitney earned Houston a second Grammy nomination for Album of the Year, while "I Wanna Dance with Somebody (Who Loves Me)" won her a second Grammy for Best Female Pop Vocal Performance. Houston went on to win four American Music Awards, six Billboard awards and her first Soul Train Music Award for the album.

Houston launched her second world tour, the Moment of Truth World Tour, in July 1987. The North American leg of the tour grossed more than $20 million, becoming one of the top ten tours on the continent, as well as the top female tour. An expansive tour, the singer toured 160 dates in four continents, including nine sold-out dates at London's Wembley Arena. During that period, Houston recorded one of the main theme songs for the 1988 Summer Olympics in Seoul, "One Moment in Time", which later became a top five US hit and hit number one in the UK, Germany and Europe and won Houston a Sports Emmy Award.

Houston participated in the Nelson Mandela 70th Birthday Tribute at London's Wembley Stadium in support of the then-imprisoned civil rights activist and the anti-apartheid movement. Houston had refused work in South Africa due to the country's then strict apartheid laws. The concert aired on June 11 of the year, was watched by half a billion viewers and raised $1 million in charities, raising awareness of apartheid. That August, Houston held a benefit concert at Madison Square Garden to fund HBCUs, raising a quarter of a million dollars. Houston's philanthropy continued in 1989 when she founded the Whitney Houston Foundation for Children, a nonprofit organization that has raised funds for the needs of children around the world. The organization cares for homelessness, children with cancer or AIDS and other issues of self-empowerment.

Houston's unprecedented success during this era caused Forbes magazine to take notice. In 1987, she ranked 8th place among the highest-paid entertainers in show business, earning $43 million, only trailing Bill Cosby and Eddie Murphy. She ranked 17th place in 1988.

=== 1990–1991: I'm Your Baby Tonight and "The Star-Spangled Banner" ===
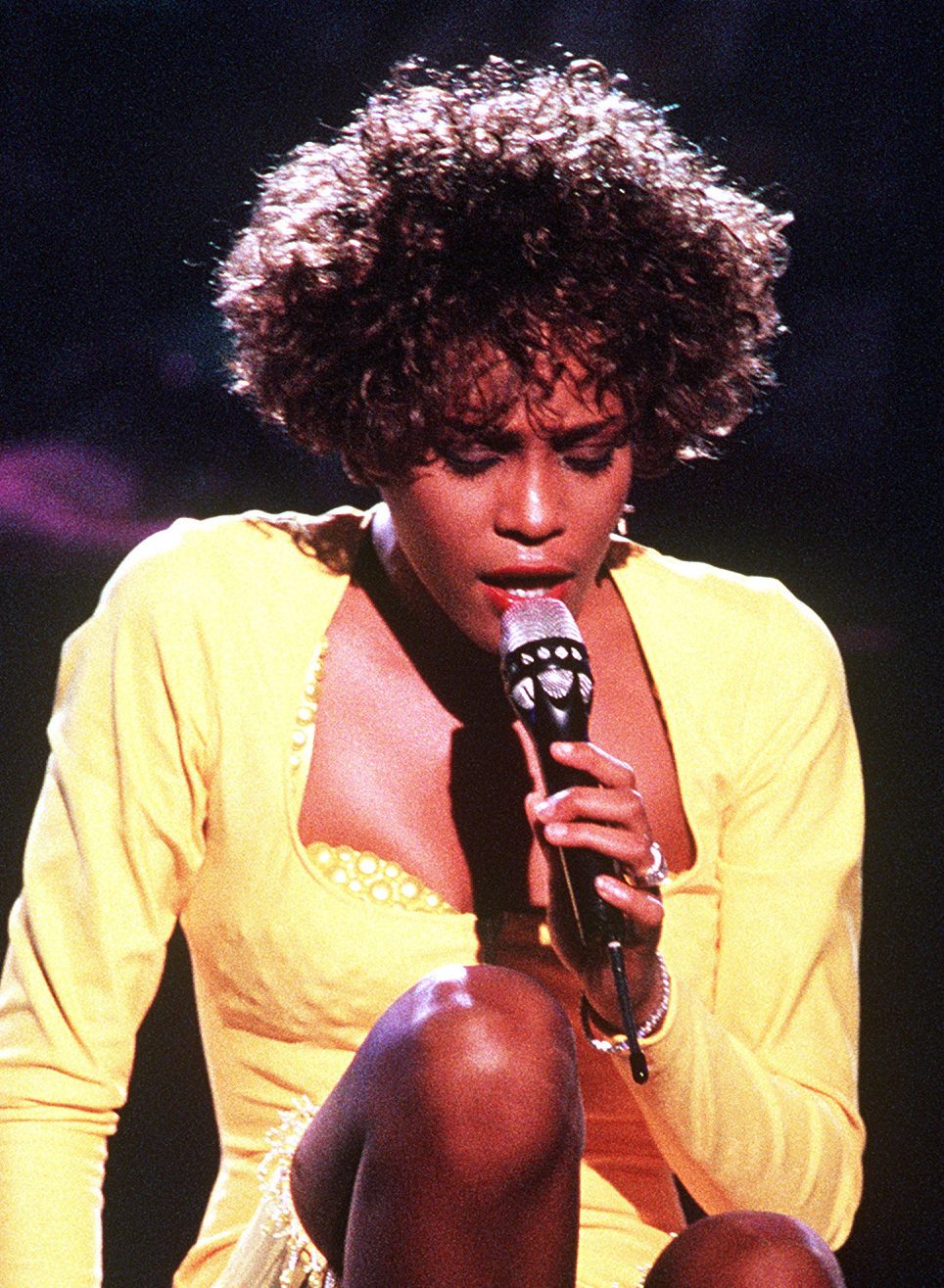
Houston performing "Saving All My Love for You" on the Welcome Home Heroes concert in 1991

With the success of her first two albums, Houston became an international crossover superstar, appealing to all demographics. However, some black critics believed she was "selling out". They felt her singing on record lacked the soul that was present during her live concerts. At the 1989 Soul Train Music Awards, when Houston's name was called out for a nomination, a few in the audience jeered. Houston defended herself against the criticism, stating, "If you're gonna have a long career, there's a certain way to do it and I did it that way. I'm not ashamed of it."

Houston took a more urban direction with her third studio album, I'm Your Baby Tonight, released in November 1990. The first album in which she served as executive producer and exerted creative control for the first time in her career, Houston recruited the production team of Antonio "L.A." Reid and Babyface, as well as Luther Vandross and Stevie Wonder for the album, while retaining previous producer Walden. Reviews were mixed to positive. Rolling Stone felt it was her "best and most integrated album", while Entertainment Weekly, at the time thought Houston's shift towards an urban direction was "superficial".

Commercially, the album was a success, peaking at number three on the Billboard 200, staying inside the top ten for 22 weeks, becoming the tenth best-selling album of 1991, while topping the Top R&B Albums chart, staying there for eight weeks. As a result, Houston earned four Billboard Music Awards, including the top-selling R&B album of 1991. Houston returned to the top of the Hot 100 with the title track and "All the Man That I Need", helping Houston to set another chart record by being the first female soloist to have multiple number one pop songs on three albums at least. (Note: Along with Houston, the other acts who have done this include the Supremes, the Beatles, Michael Jackson, Mariah Carey, Janet Jackson and The Weeknd.) The title track, in particular, gave Babyface and Reid their first number one pop single, while "All the Man That I Need" became Houston's third single to top the pop, R&B and AC charts. The ballad "Miracle" and the more hip-hop driven "My Name Is Not Susan" followed those singles inside the top 20, with "Miracle" reaching the top ten. The remix of "My Name Is Not Susan" included rapper Monie Love.

I'm Your Baby Tonight would go on to sell ten million units worldwide, including going platinum four times in the US. In addition to winning the four Billboard Music Awards, Houston was nominated for several Grammys and American Music Awards for the album. A bonus track from the album's Japanese edition, "Higher Love", was remixed by Norwegian DJ and record producer Kygo and released posthumously in 2019 to commercial success. It topped the US Dance Club Songs chart and reached number two in the UK, becoming Houston's highest-charting single in the country since 1999.

During the Persian Gulf War, on January 27, 1991, Houston performed "The Star-Spangled Banner", the US national anthem, at Super Bowl XXV at Tampa Stadium. Houston's vocals were pre-recorded, prompting criticism. Dan Klores, a spokesman for Houston, said: "This is not a Milli Vanilli thing. She sang live, but the microphone was turned off. It was a technical decision, partially based on the noise factor. This is standard procedure at these events." Nevertheless, a commercial single and video of the performance reached the Top 20 on the US Hot 100, giving Houston the biggest chart hit for a performance of the national anthem. (Note: José Feliciano's version reached number 50 in November 1968.)

Houston donated her share of the proceeds to the American Red Cross Gulf Crisis Fund and was named to the Red Cross Board of Governors. Her rendition was critically acclaimed and is considered the benchmark for singers; VH1 listed the performance as one of the greatest moments that rocked TV. Following the September 11, 2001, terrorist attacks, the single was rereleased, with all profits going towards the firefighters and victims of the attacks. It reached number 6 in the Hot 100 and was certified platinum. The song's re-charting made Houston the first woman to chart the same song inside the top 20 of the Hot 100. In March 1991, Houston put together her Welcome Home Heroes concert with HBO for the soldiers fighting in the Persian Gulf War and their families. The free concert took place at Naval Station Norfolk in Norfolk, Virginia in front of 3,500 servicemen and women. HBO descrambled the concert so that it was free for everyone to watch. The show gave HBO its highest ratings ever at the time.

Houston embarked on her third world tour, the I'm Your Baby Tonight World Tour, in which Houston performed 99 shows, including a ten-date sold-out residency at Wembley Arena in London. The concert tour produced mixed to positive reviews. While The Sun Sentinel argued that Houston should have opted for smaller venues and theaters that were "far more suitable to her sophistication and talent", USA Today praised Houston for "shak[ing] the confinements of her recordings' calculated productions and gets downright gutsy and soulful".

=== 1992–1994: The Bodyguard ===
With the success of her music, Houston received offers of film work, including work with Robert De Niro, Quincy Jones and Spike Lee, but she did not feel the time was right. Her first film role was in The Bodyguard, released in 1992. Houston played a star who is being stalked by a crazed fan and hires a bodyguard (played by Kevin Costner) to protect her. Houston's mainstream appeal allowed audiences to look past the interracial nature of her character's relationship with Costner's character. However, controversy arose as some felt Houston's face had been intentionally left out of the advertising to hide the film's interracial relationship. In a 1993 interview with Rolling Stone, Houston said that "people know who Whitney Houston is – I'm black. You can't hide that fact."

The film received mixed reviews. While Houston was accused of merely "playing herself" but came out "largely unscathed", and "lacked chemistry" with her co-star, another review wrote that she "photographs wonderfully, and has a warm smile, and yet is able to suggest selfish and egotistical dimensions in the character." Houston was nominated for Outstanding Actress at the NAACP Image Awards, the MTV Movie Award for Best Female Performance and the People's Choice Award nod for Favorite Actress in a Dramatic Motion Picture. Upon its release, The Bodyguard grossed more than $121 million in the U.S. and $410 million worldwide, making it one of the top 100 highest-grossing films in history at its time of release. It remains in the top 50 of most successful R-rated films in box-office history.

The film's soundtrack also enjoyed success. As executive producer of the soundtrack, Houston recorded six tracks, two of which she produced. Rolling Stone described it as "nothing more than pleasant, tasteful and urbane". The soundtrack opened at number two on the Billboard 200 and took the number-one spot the following week, accumulating 20 weeks atop the chart, the first album by a woman to do so. One of the fastest-selling albums ever, it became the first album in music history to sell more than a million copies in a single week under the Nielsen Soundscan tracking system. The Bodyguard became the first album in history by a female artist to be certified diamond by the RIAA after it passed the ten-million mark in early November 1993. It has since gone on to sell more than 19 million copies alone in the US, with total sales reaching 45 million copies worldwide, becoming the best-selling album by a female artist and the best-selling soundtrack album in history, earning Houston several Guinness World Records.

At the 1994 Grammy Awards, Houston won the Grammy for Album of the Year for the soundtrack and was the first black woman to win as producer as well as artist. In addition to the Grammy, Houston also won a record-setting eight American Music Awards, eleven Billboard Music Awards, five NAACP Image Awards and earned the Soul Train Music Award for the Sammy Davis Jr. Entertainer of the Year honor. Houston also earned international honors for the soundtrack, including a Juno Award, five World Music Awards, six Japan Gold Disc Awards and a Brit Award.

The soundtrack's lead single was "I Will Always Love You", written and originally recorded by Dolly Parton. Houston's version was highly acclaimed by critics, regarding it as her "signature song" or "iconic performance". Rolling Stone and USA Today called her rendition a tour-de-force. The song went on to become the longest-running number one single in Billboard Hot 100 history at the time for a record setting 14 weeks. The song also became Houston's fourth record-setting "triple-crown" number one Billboard hit after it topped the R&B and AC charts. (Note: Houston shares the feat with singer Lionel Richie.) It has gone on to sell more than eleven million units in the United States and was certified diamond in January 2021, making Houston just one of four female artists to earn a diamond-certified single and album. It remains the best-selling US single by a female artist. The song topped the charts in 34 countries and went on to sell 24 million units worldwide, becoming the best-selling single ever by a female solo artist. The song earned Houston the Grammys for Record of the Year and Best Pop Female Vocal Performance.

The soundtrack's follow-up singles, "I'm Every Woman" and "I Have Nothing", both reached number four on the Billboard Hot 100. Houston set a new Billboard Hot 100 chart record on March 13, 1993 when the two singles joined "I Will Always Love You" in simultaneously charting inside the top 20 in the same week, the first for an artist in the Nielsen SoundScan era. The fourth single, "Run to You", achieved modest success in the US and UK, while "Queen of the Night" reached the top 40 in several global charts and a remixed version topped the US dance chart. The success of The Bodyguard led to Houston becoming a cover story for Rolling Stone in its June 10, 1993 issue.

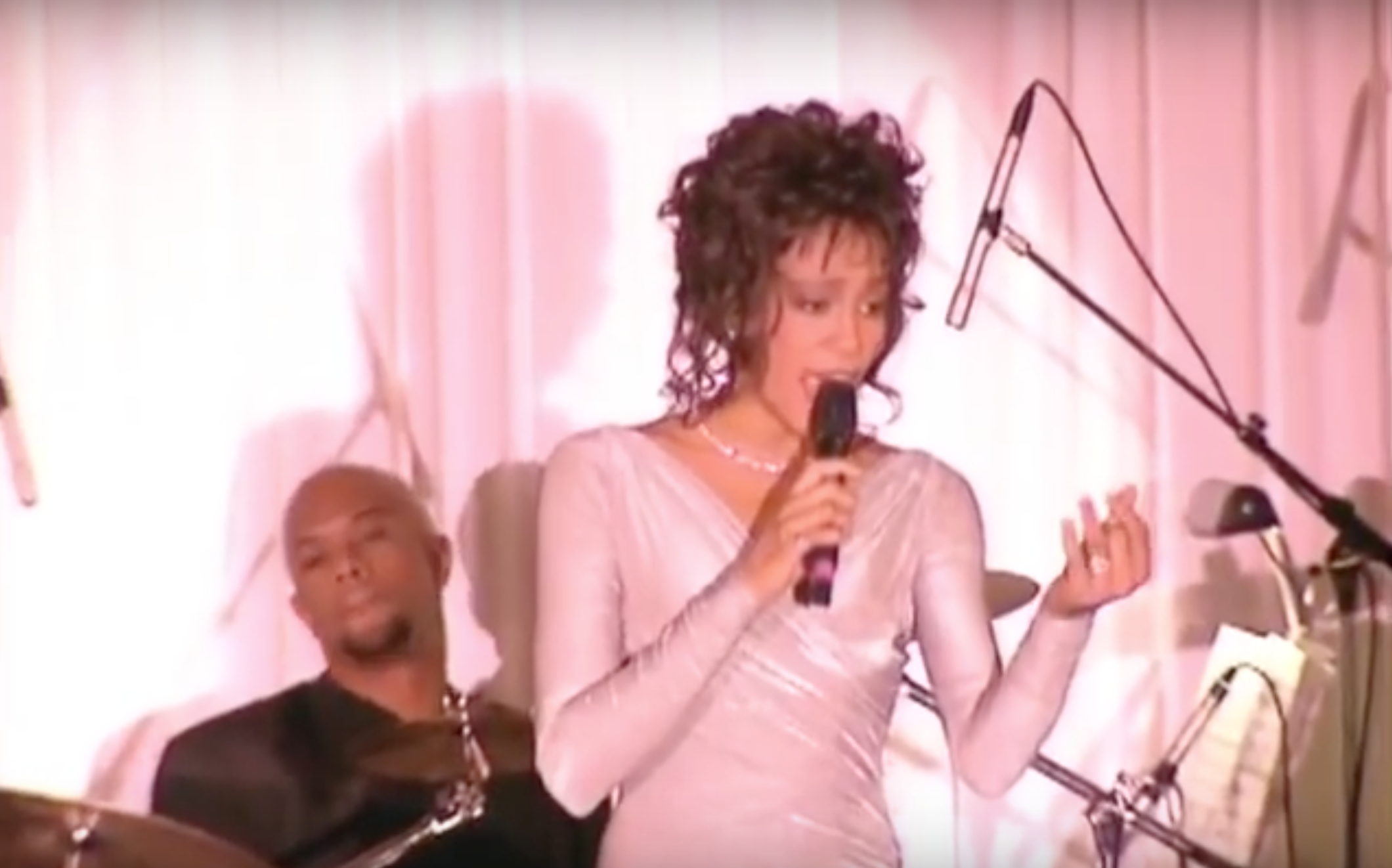
Houston performing at a state dinner in the White House honoring South African president Nelson Mandela in 1994

Houston then embarked on her most expansive global tour to date: The Bodyguard World Tour. She toured for nearly two years to mostly sold-out audiences across five continents. Houston eventually ranked as the third highest-earning female entertainer of 1993-94, according to Forbes, named as one of the 100 most powerful people in Hollywood by Premiere and placed in the top five of Entertainment Weekly's annual "Entertainer of the Year" ranking. In 1994, Jet reported that Houston was one of the top ten television celebrity spokespeople of the year according to Video Storyboard Tests due to her celebrity endorsement of AT&T that year.

In October 1994, Houston attended and performed at a state dinner in the White House honoring newly elected South African president Nelson Mandela. At the end of her world tour, Houston performed three concerts in South Africa to honor President Mandela, playing to more than 200,000 people; this made her the first major musician to visit the newly unified and apartheid free nation following Mandela's winning election. Portions of Whitney: The Concert for a New South Africa were broadcast live on HBO with funds of the concerts being donated to various charities in South Africa. The event was considered the nation's "biggest media event since the inauguration of Nelson Mandela". In May 1995, Houston hosted the 8th Annual Nickelodeon Kids' Choice Awards. A month later, in June 1995, Houston's Whitney Houston Foundation for Children was awarded a VH1 Honor for all of their charitable work.

=== 1995–1997: Waiting to Exhale, The Preacher's Wife and Cinderella ===
In 1995, Houston starred in Waiting to Exhale as Savannah Jackson, a TV producer. Houston called the film "a breakthrough for the image of black women because it presents them both as professionals and as caring mothers". It reached number one in the US box office and entered the highest-grossing film lists of both 1995 and 1996, eventually grossing over $67 million in the US, while grossing $81 million altogether worldwide. At the time of release, the film received mixed reviews from critics. According to Susan King from the Los Angeles Times, the film "showed the power of black actresses and led to other successful movies with ethnic casts." The film's success led to similar films such as How Stella Got Her Groove Back, The Best Man and Diary of a Mad Black Woman. The film was also notable for its portrayal of black women as strong middle class citizens rather than as stereotypes. Houston received positive reviews for her role, with The New York Times reporting: "Ms. Houston has shed the defensive hauteur that made her portrayal of a pop star in 'The Bodyguard' seem so distant." Houston was nominated a second time for the NAACP Image Award for Outstanding Actress.

Houston contributed three songs to the film's soundtrack and advised producer Babyface to make it an "album of women with vocal distinction". As a result, several other contemporary female R&B singers such as Brandy, Mary J. Blige and Toni Braxton contributed to the soundtrack. Houston's single, "Exhale (Shoop Shoop)", debuted at number one on the Billboard Hot 100, only the third single to do so. (Note: It also became the first song from a soundtrack to debut at number one and is only one of four soundtrack songs to do so, the others being Celine Dion's "My Heart Will Go On" and Aerosmith's "I Don't Want to Miss a Thing", both released in 1998 and Justin Timberlake's "Can't Stop the Feeling!" in 2016.) Two other Houston singles from the soundtrack, "Count On Me", a duet with CeCe Winans, and "Why Does It Hurt So Bad", also reached the US top 40, with "Count On Me" reaching number eight on the Billboard Hot 100. The soundtrack reached number one on the Billboard 200 in January 1996 and was certified seven-times platinum in the US. The album received eleven Grammy nominations and the American Music Award for Favorite Soundtrack. The soundtrack received strong reviews; as Entertainment Weekly stated: "the album goes down easy, just as you'd expect from a package framed by Whitney Houston tracks ... the soundtrack waits to exhale, hovering in sensuous suspense" and has since ranked it as one of the 100 Best Movie Soundtracks.

Houston's next film, the Christmas comedy The Preacher's Wife (1996), was largely an update of The Bishop's Wife (1948) and starred Houston alongside Denzel Washington and Courtney B. Vance. Houston earned $10 million for the role, making her the highest-earning African-American actress in Hollywood at the time. The movie, with its all African-American cast, was a moderate success, earning about $50 million in the US. The film gave Houston the strongest reviews of her acting career. The San Francisco Chronicle said Houston "is rather angelic herself, displaying a divine talent for being virtuous and flirtatious at the same time" and she "exudes gentle yet spirited warmth, especially when praising the Lord in her gorgeous singing voice". Houston won the NAACP Image Award for Outstanding Actress in a Motion Picture for the film.

The accompanying soundtrack was Houston's first full-length foray into gospel music, which she produced with Mervyn Warren. Six of the more traditional gospel tracks were recorded with the Georgia Mass Choir at the Great Star Rising Baptist Church in Atlanta. Upon its release, the soundtrack entered number three on the Billboard 200 and topped the Top Gospel Albums chart, the first by a female artist. Three singles were released, including "I Believe in You and Me", which reached the US top-ten, and "Step by Step", which became a hit in Europe. The soundtrack sold six million units worldwide, becoming the best-selling gospel album of all time. Despite its success, Houston complained of not receiving a gospel nomination at the 40th Annual Grammy Awards in 1998 and responded by boycotting the ceremony. (Note: Houston told Entertainment Tonight, "basically it was my gospel album, and it was excluded from the gospel category altogether. I'm not going this year... I'm sick of work being done and people not recognizing it.") Houston's work was acknowledged by the Dove Awards and the NAACP Image Awards, where Houston received the award for Outstanding Gospel Artist.

In 1996, Houston formed her film production company, BrownHouse Productions. Debra Martin Chase became her partner. Their goal was "to show aspects of the lives of African-Americans that have not been brought to the screen before" while improving how African-Americans are portrayed in film and television. Their first project was a made-for-television remake of Rodgers and Hammerstein's Cinderella. In addition to co-producing, Houston starred in the film as the Fairy Godmother along with Brandy, Jason Alexander, Whoopi Goldberg and Bernadette Peters. Houston was initially offered the role of Cinderella in 1993, but other projects intervened. The film is notable for its multi-racial cast and non-stereotypical message. An estimated 60 million viewers tuned into the special giving ABC its highest TV ratings in 16 years. The movie received seven Emmy nominations including Outstanding Variety, Musical or Comedy, while winning Outstanding Art Direction in a Variety, Musical or Comedy Special.

Houston and Chase held the rights to Donald Bogle's story about actress Dorothy Dandridge, and spent five years trying to convince studios to make a biopic accordingly, but on August 21, 1999, Introducing Dorothy Dandridge, starring Halle Berry and based on a book by Earl Mills, debuted on HBO.

In October, a third HBO concert special, Classic Whitney: Live from Washington, D.C. aired with proceeds of the special going to Marian Wright Edelman's Children's Defense Fund, eventually reaching $300,000. In early 1998, Houston received the Quincy Jones Award for outstanding career achievements at the 12th Soul Train Music Awards.

=== 1998–2000: My Love Is Your Love and Whitney: The Greatest Hits ===
In 1998, Houston released My Love Is Your Love, her first studio album in eight years. Released during the so-called "Super Tuesday" week on November 17 of the year where multiple albums by other recording artists were also issued, the album debuted and peaked at number 13 on the Billboard 200. The album featured production from Rodney Jerkins, Wyclef Jean and Missy Elliott and resulted in Houston receiving some of her strongest reviews ever, with Rolling Stone writing that Houston was singing "with a bite in her voice" while The Village Voice called it "Whitney's sharpest and most satisfying so far". Billboard magazine noted the album had a "funkier and edgier sound than past releases" and saw Houston "handling urban dance, hip-hop, mid-tempo R&B, reggae, torch songs and ballads all with great dexterity". The album produced five top 40 singles on the Billboard Hot 100, the most for a Houston album since 1987's Whitney.

The leading single was the Mariah Carey-featured duet, "When You Believe", off The Prince of Egypt, which peaked at number 15 in the US and reached number two on the Eurochart Hot 100, and later won an Academy Award for Best Original Song. The second single, "Heartbreak Hotel", peaked at number two on the Billboard Hot 100, while the following two singles, "It's Not Right but It's Okay" and the title track, produced by Jean, each peaked at number four. The final single, "I Learned From the Best", also reached the US top 40. The album remained on the Billboard 200 for almost two years and sold four million units alone in the US, where it was certified four-times platinum by the RIAA. Besides "Believe", the latter four singles reached number one on the Billboard Dance Club Songs chart.

Houston's North American leg of her world tour to promote the album was successful but plagued by cancellations with Houston's publicist citing "throat problems and a 'bronchitis situation'". However, its European leg was ranked as the highest-grossing arena tour of the year in the continent. The success of the tour led to My Love Is Your Love reaching number one on the European Top 100 Albums chart in August 1999, staying there for six weeks. All of Houston's singles from the album were successful internationally, with the title track reaching number one on the Eurochart Hot 100 and selling more than three million units worldwide while the last release, "I Learned From the Best" topped the charts in Poland and Romania. Eventually, global sales of the album reached 10 million units worldwide.

The album's European success helped Houston win the MTV Europe Music Award for Best R&B, while the music video for "Heartbreak Hotel" led to Houston receiving her first MTV Video Music Award nomination in over a decade. Nominated for four Grammys at the 2000 ceremony, Houston nabbed her sixth and final competitive Grammy in the Best Female R&B Vocal Performance category for "It's Not Right but It's Okay". Near the end of the year, the Recording Industry Association of America hosted its Century Awards and named Houston the top-selling R&B female artist of the century with certified US sales of 51 million records at the time while the soundtrack to The Bodyguard received the award for top-selling soundtrack album of the century. In March 2000, Houston earned a special honor at the 14th Soul Train Music Awards as the female artist of the decade for her extraordinary artistic contributions during the 1990s.

The next year, in May 2000, Houston's first compilation album, Whitney: The Greatest Hits, was released. The album reached number five in the US and number one in the UK and also reached the top ten in multiple countries. A double-disc collection, the album's first disc, "Cool Down", featured all of Houston's hit ballads, while the second disc, "Throw Down", featured house and club remixes of the singer's uptempo hits, in response to the well-received dance remixes from My Love Is Your Love. It also included four new tracks, three of them duets from the likes of Deborah Cox, Enrique Iglesias and George Michael. The singles with the latter two artists, "Could I Have This Kiss Forever" and "If I Told You That", both became hits in Europe. The set was later certified five times platinum in the US for sales of five million copies, while worldwide sales reached 10 million.

=== 2000–2008: Just Whitney, Princess Diaries, and Cheetah Girls ===
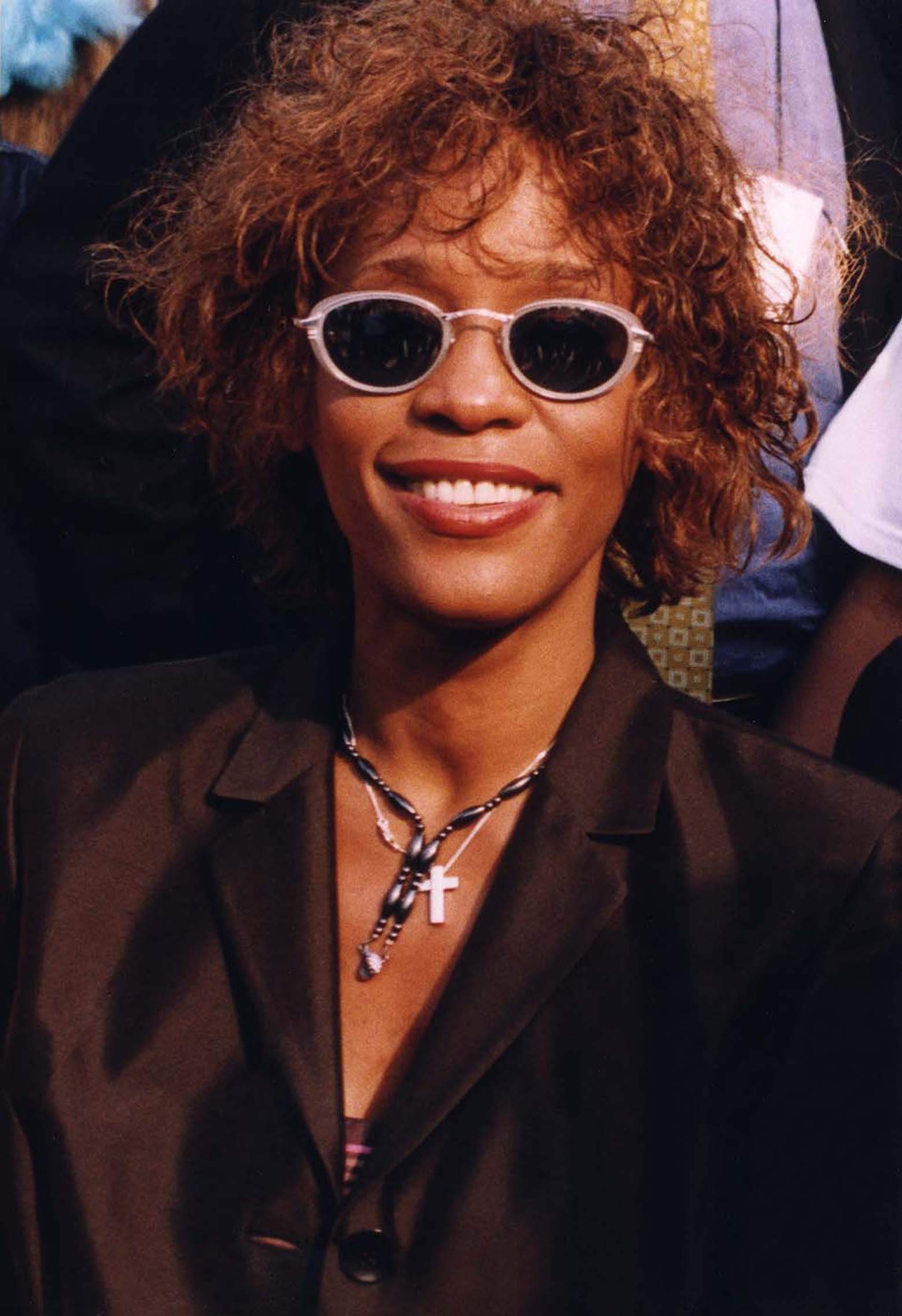
Houston outside the Capitol Hill, Washington, D.C., on October 16, 2000

Houston's reputation as "America's Sweetheart", which she was nicknamed for the duration of her career, came under scrutiny at the beginning of the 2000s. Reports of erratic behavior, showing up hours late to interviews, photo shoots, rehearsals and canceling several concerts, had been following her since the late 1990s.

Houston failed to show up to induct Clive Davis into the Rock and Roll Hall of Fame in March 2000. Weeks later, Houston was scheduled to perform at the Academy Awards but was fired from the event by musical director and longtime friend Burt Bacharach. At the time, her publicist cited throat problems as the reason for the cancellation. In his book, The Big Show: High Times and Dirty Dealings Backstage at the Academy Awards, author Steve Pond revealed that "Houston's voice was shaky, she seemed distracted and jittery, and her attitude was casual, almost defiant"; though she was supposed to perform "Over the Rainbow", she sang a different song during rehearsals. Houston later admitted she had been fired. Houston, however, did show up for a scheduled performance to celebrate Arista's 25th anniversary with Clive Davis, and her performance received good reviews.

In May 2000, Houston's longtime executive assistant and friend, Robyn Crawford, resigned from Houston's management company.

Despite increasing negative press, Houston continued to find success. She produced the film The Princess Diaries (2001) alongside fellow BrownHouse partner Debra Martin Chase. Starring Anne Hathaway and Julie Andrews, the film became an unexpected success in the box office, grossing more than $165 million worldwide. Houston and Chase became the first black people in box office history to produce a film that surpassed $100 million in the box office. In August 2001, Houston signed one of the biggest record deals in music history, with Arista/BMG. She renewed her contract for $100 million to release six new albums, for which she would also earn royalties.

A performance at the Michael Jackson: 30th Anniversary Celebration in September 2001 led to increasing rumors of drug use and possible health issues due to Houston's extremely thin frame. She canceled a second performance scheduled for the following night. Within weeks, Houston's rendition of "The Star-Spangled Banner" was re-released after the September 11 attacks, with the proceeds donated to the New York Firefighters 9/11 Disaster Relief Fund and the New York Fraternal Order of Police. The single reached No. 6 on the US Hot 100, topping its previous position.

Houston released her fifth studio album, Just Whitney, in December 2002. The album debuted at number nine on the Billboard 200 and was certified platinum, though it received mixed reviews. In August 2003, Houston's second television film as a producer, The Cheetah Girls, premiered on the Disney Channel. A soundtrack of the film, executive produced by Houston, became successful, reaching double platinum status in the US. Later that November, Houston released her first Christmas album, One Wish: The Holiday Album, which featured traditional holiday songs and was certified gold in the US.

In April 2004, Houston's second film as producer, The Princess Diaries 2: Royal Engagement, was equally successful in the box office like its predecessor, earning $134 million in the box office. For most of the year, Houston toured internationally. Houston's success behind the scenes continued in 2006 with the airing of The Cheetah Girls 2, which Houston served as executive producer. The film remains one of the highest-rated Disney Channel Original Movies (DCOM) in history with more than 8.1 million viewers tuning in for the premiere.

=== 2009–2012: I Look to You and Sparkle ===
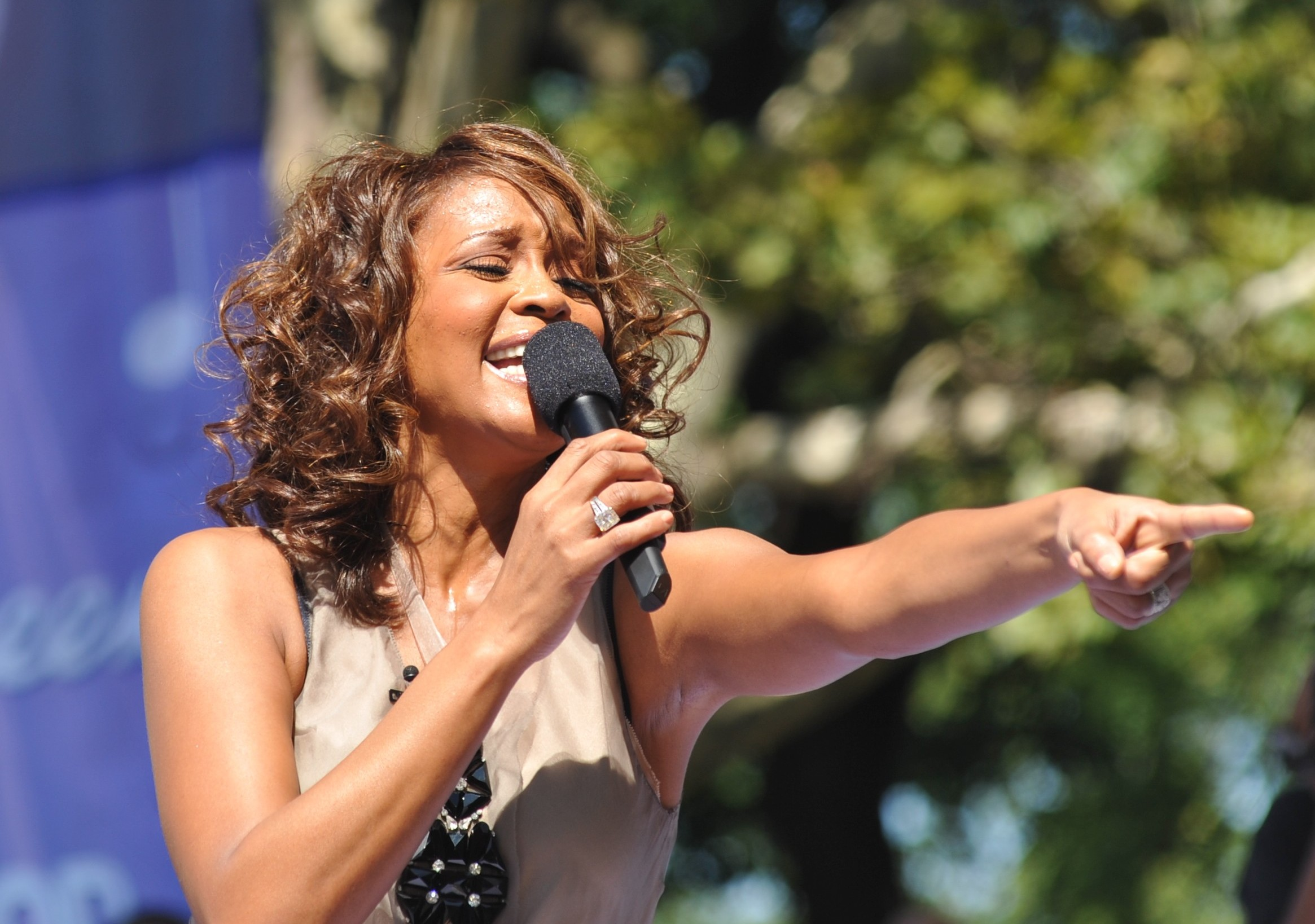
Houston performing "I Look to You" on Good Morning America, September 1, 2009

Houston released I Look to You in August 2009. The album debuted at No. 1 on the Billboard 200 with 305,000 copies sold, marking a strong return. The album's success was followed by her performance on various European television shows and her appearance as a guest mentor on The X Factor in the UK. Despite a wardrobe malfunction during her performance of "Million Dollar Bill", the single still achieved commercial success, later going platinum in the United Kingdom. The title track was also a hit and was later certified platinum in the United States. Following the album's release, Houston embarked on the Nothing but Love World Tour, her first world tour in more than 10 years. Despite some negative reviews and rescheduled concerts, Houston continued to perform.

In January 2010, Houston was nominated for two NAACP Image Awards and won Best Music Video for "I Look to You". On January 16, she received the Entertainers Award at the BET Honors, acknowledging her lifetime achievements spanning more than 25 years. In January 2011, Houston made a surprise appearance at the BET Celebration of Gospel where she joined friend, gospel singer Kim Burrell onstage, to perform a duet version of "I Look to You"; their performance was received well. It would be Houston's final television performance prior to her death.

Later in 2010, Houston was cast in the remake of the 1976 film Sparkle, where she served as both a star and executive producer. The film marked her final acting role before her untimely death. The film was released on August 17, 2012. The soundtrack featured "Celebrate", the last song Houston recorded, which was released in May 2012.

On February 9, 2012, two days before her death, she performed a final public performance as an impromptu duet with her friend and former collaborator Kelly Price, at the Tru nightclub in Hollywood, singing "Jesus Loves Me".

== Artistry ==
=== Influences ===
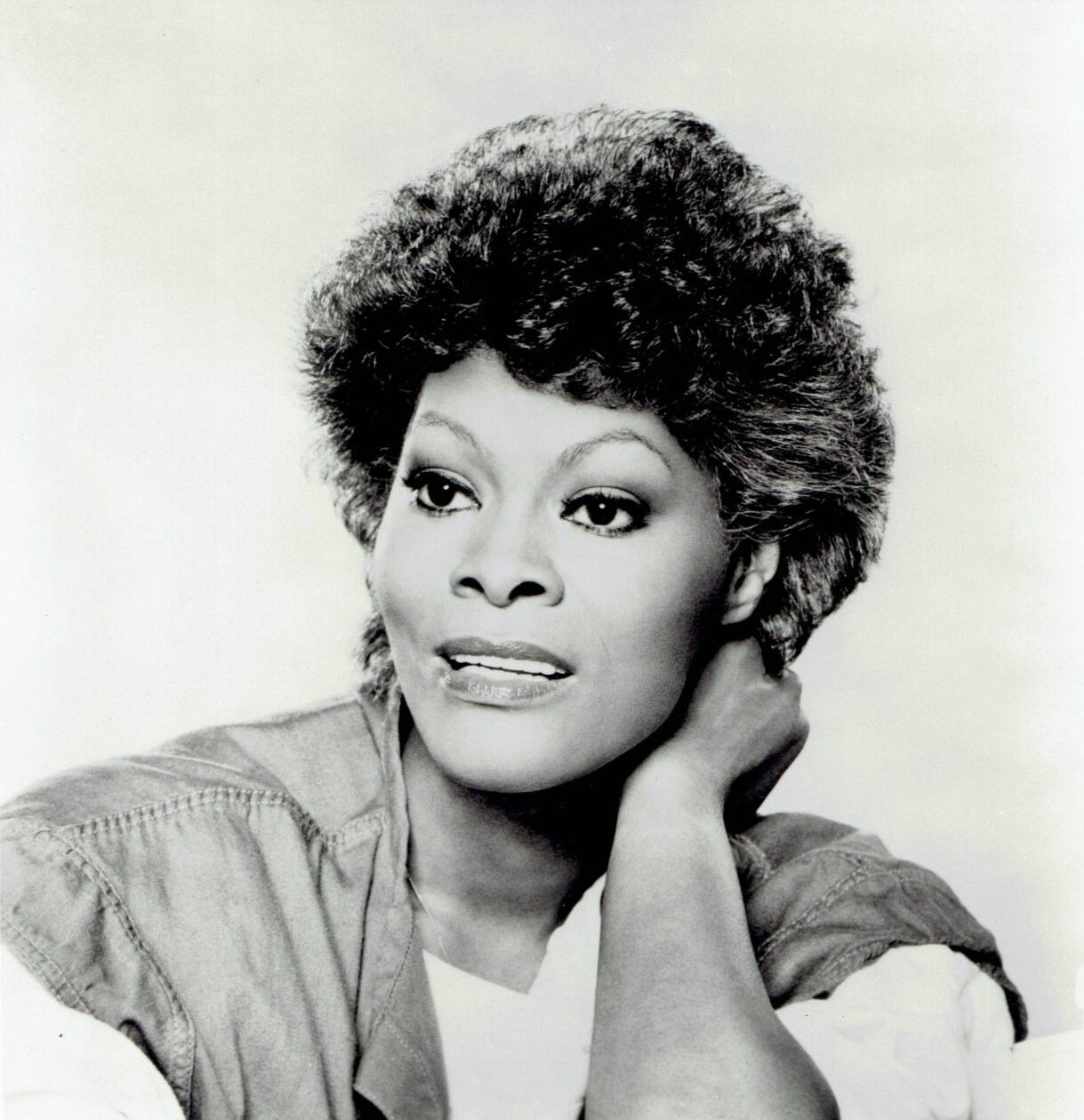
Houston's cousin Dionne Warwick (pictured in 1986) was one of her main influences.

Houston's biggest musical influence was her mother Cissy Houston. In terms of presentation, stage presence and showmanship, Houston was heavily influenced by her cousin Dionne Warwick. Houston had viewed Warwick's shows since her early childhood. Her other cousin Dee Dee Warwick was said to have also influenced her vocally as well.

Other musical influences included Karen Carpenter, Aretha Franklin, Chaka Khan, Gladys Knight, Roberta Flack and godmother Darlene Love.

Barbra Streisand was a singer Houston admired and was inspired by as well. African American entertainers Sammy Davis Jr., Lena Horne and Dorothy Dandridge were artists Houston looked up to in terms of them breaking racial barriers for African Americans in entertainment.

Houston learned her performance style in her early career from Luther Vandross, who would perform shows in-the-round at arenas, with Houston's first two major world tours being in-the-round type shows. As a child, Houston's first record purchase was Stevie Wonder.

Houston was also heavily influenced by gospel music, having been exposed to it at her mother's church at New Hope Baptist Church, where most of her maternal relatives performed and played instruments; Houston would incorporate gospel elements in much of her secular music works and also recorded gospel songs.

=== Musical style ===
Houston's music encompassed a broad range of genres, including R&B, pop, rock, soul, gospel, funk, dance, Latin pop, disco, house, hip-hop soul, new jack swing, opera, reggae, and Christmas. Among the lyrical themes explored in her music included romance, relationships, religion and feminism. The Rock and Roll Hall of Fame stated: "Her sound expanded through collaborations with a wide array of artists, including Stevie Wonder, Luther Vandross, Babyface, Missy Elliott, Bobby Brown, and Mariah Carey." AllMusic commented that, "Houston was able to handle big adult contemporary ballads, effervescent, stylish dance-pop and slick urban contemporary soul with equal dexterity". Houston was considered a trendsetter in pop balladry, with Richard Rischar stating "the black pop ballad of the mid-1980s had been dominated by the vocal and production style that was smooth and polished, led by singers Whitney Houston, Janet Jackson, and James Ingram."

During the early stages of Houston's career, some Black critics and audiences accused her voice and music of not sounding "Black enough". Steve Rose of The Guardian attributed this perception to her "syrupy ballads and perky dance-pop," along with music videos that featured a mix of both Black and white dancers. At the time, Houston had established herself as a mainstream pop star, with a musical style that differed from the soul and R&B genres often associated with Black artists. Due to her mixing pop, R&B and gospel music, Rolling Stone called her "the ultimate crossover artist".

Houston was also acclaimed for mixing older soul and pop with the cutting-edge sound of the contemporaries of her era. Houston's producer Narada Michael Walden told Rolling Stone in 2012, "Because of her cousin Dionne, she understood all those pretty-ass melodies from Burt Bacharach. But because she was young and from the era of Michael Jackson, Prince and Madonna, she had soul in her too – those rhythms. She had both sides. Plus, she was so damn gorgeous. You couldn’t say no to her."

Andrew Chan of Slant Magazine wrote "the way Whitney's image muffled her political significance made it easier for non-black singers to mimic her without being accused of cultural theft, and the following decade witnessed an accelerated de-racialization of African-American vocal tradition. The shift has been so complete that virtually every new female pop star expecting mass acclaim for her instrument must now be equipped with an arsenal of techniques that a few decades ago would have marked her as too 'soul', too 'urban', too black for the white audience".

=== Voice and timbre ===
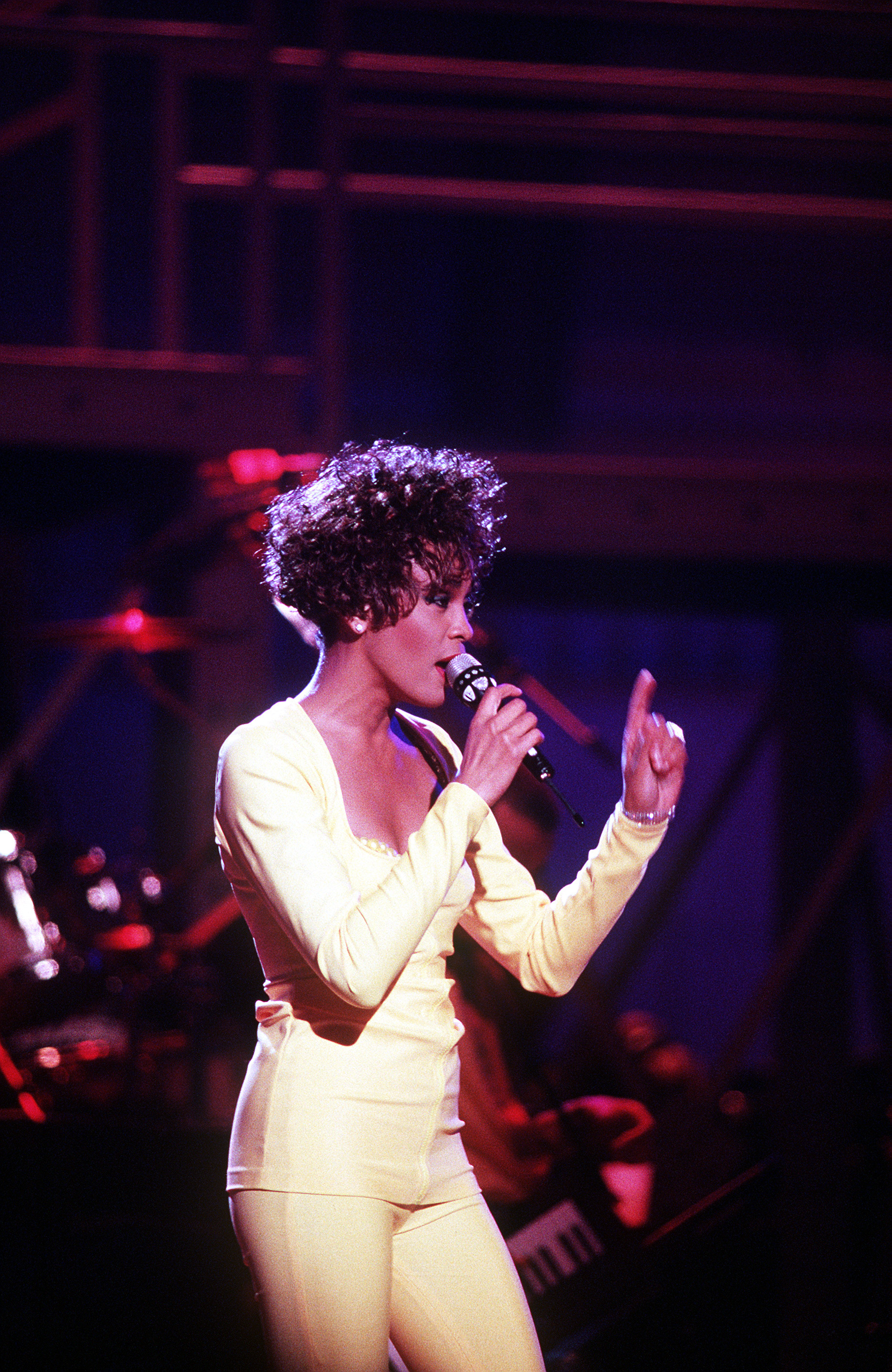
Houston's vocal ability earned her the nickname "the Voice".

Houston had a four-octave vocal range. Her vocal ability led critics to refer to her as "the Voice". Her voice has sometimes been described as either a soprano, spinto soprano or mezzo-soprano. (Note: Following Houston's vocal changes in the mid-to-late 1990s, Houston's voice type was sometimes labeled a "dramatic mezzo-soprano" up until the end of her life, due to vocal maturity and lifestyle choices.) Music critic Andrew Chan of Slant Magazine said of Houston's timbre that it was "so clean that when she did sustain a note at the very top of her chest range (for instance, in the climactic moments of "I'm Every Woman"), there was none of that danger, that premonition of something about to snap, so integral to the drama of deep-soul testimony", comparing her vocal style of that of soul-oriented artists such as Aretha Franklin and Chaka Khan. Chan further stated that what made Houston "universally palpable" was "her knack for harnessing the intensity of Aretha while also letting the ear-caressing tones of quiet storm share the foreground." In his article on Houston during the singer's early career in 1987, Richard Corliss of Time magazine wrote that Houston's voice was "the supplest pipes in pop music." In another unrelated Time review, they wrote of Houston's voice, "if the human voice is a musical instrument, hers is a Stradivarius among ordinary violins."

Jon Pareles of The New York Times stated Houston's voice was a "technical marvel from its velvety depths to its allistic middle register to its ringing and airy heights". Throughout her career, her studio work was often compared to her live performances, in which Matthew Perpetua of Rolling Stone stated that what made Houston a "great singer" was her "ability to connect with a song and drive home its drama and emotion with incredible precision", adding that she was a "brilliant performer and her live shows often eclipsed her studio recordings". Elysa Gardner of the Los Angeles Times in her review for the soundtrack of The Preacher's Wife highly praised Houston's vocal ability, commenting, "She is first and foremost a pop diva – at that, the best one we have. No other female pop star – not Mariah Carey, not Celine Dion, not Barbra Streisand – quite rivals Houston in her exquisite vocal fluidity and purity of tone and her ability to infuse a lyric with mesmerizing melodrama." Michael Jackson named Houston as one of his musical inspirations, calling her a "wonderful singer, real stylist. You hear one line, and you know who it is." Following her death, music critic Jon Caramanica of The New York Times commented, "Her voice was clean and strong, with barely any grit, well suited to the songs of love and aspiration. [...] Hers was a voice of triumph and achievement and it made for any number of stunning, time-stopping vocal performances." Music critic Ann Powers of the Los Angeles Times said Houston's voice "stands like monuments upon the landscape of 20th century pop, defining the architecture of their times, sheltering the dreams of millions and inspiring the climbing careers of countless imitators". Mariah Carey stated, "She [Whitney] has a really rich, strong mid-belt that very few people have". Rolling Stone listed Houston the second greatest singer of all time, behind only Aretha Franklin, with the magazine calling her the "standard-bearer of R&B vocals".

Houston was credited with popularizing melisma during the 1980s and 1990s. Though other artists such as Aretha Franklin, Stevie Wonder and Ray Charles had used the technique prior, vocal coach Steve Sweetland explained that what set Houston apart was that with her, it "was an attitude more than anything else. She truly believed in the artistic value of the melisma. Whereas the others were perhaps simply going along with the trends, she embodied that; she made it part of herself." Lauren Everitt of BBC News commented on the melisma used in Houston's recording. "An early 'I' in Whitney Houston's 'I Will Always Love You' takes nearly six seconds to sing. In those seconds the former gospel singer-turned-pop star packs a series of different notes into the single syllable", stated Everitt. "The technique is repeated throughout the song, most pronouncedly [sic] on every 'I' and 'you'. The vocal technique is called melisma and it has inspired a host of imitators. Other artists may have used it before Houston, but it was her rendition of Dolly Parton's love song that pushed the technique into the mainstream in the 90s. [ ... ] But perhaps what Houston nailed best was moderation." Everitt said that "[i]n a climate of reality shows ripe with 'oversinging,' it's easy to appreciate Houston's ability to save melisma for just the right moment."

=== Stage performances ===
Most of Houston's early concert tours to promote her debut album and second album were performed in-the-round, also known as arena theatre or central staging, which is a theatrical stage configuration in which the audience surrounds the performance area on all sides. The shows mostly consisted of Houston, her nine-piece live band and four background vocalists with minimal use of choreography. For her second world tour, the Moment of Truth World Tour, she began incorporating backup dancers.

For her third world tour to support the I'm Your Baby Tonight album in 1991, Houston performed more elaborate choreography with male backup dancers and sometimes wore a headset during uptempo performances. Houston mostly wore catsuits designed by Marc Bouwer, which differed from her previous tours' wardrobe of mostly gowns and dresses. The tour also was the start of Houston and musical director Rickey Minor incorporating musical medleys, which became a Houston trademark. Initially, for her Bodyguard World Tour during its 1993 leg, Houston performed to smaller venues wanting to present a more intimate experience. But by the time Houston took the tour overseas, however, Houston performed at larger arenas and stadiums throughout Europe, Asia and South America. During her My Love Is Your Love World Tour in 1999, Houston wore edgier outfits designed for her by Dolce & Gabbana. The backup dancers on her Bodyguard and My Love Is Your Love tours were female while the dancers on her Nothing but Love World Tour were male.

Some of Houston's live performance trademarks included her rearranging her hit records with her band, singing it in a different style from the recordings. Houston also constantly ad-libbed and occasionally would scat-sing in the middle of the performances, particularly "Saving All My Love for You". Houston would also showcase her vocal range by extending notes longer, usually done by slower rearrangements by her band.

Stephen Holden from The New York Times, in his review of Houston's Radio City Music Hall concert on July 20, 1993, praised her attitude as a singer, writing, "Whitney Houston is one of the few contemporary pop stars of whom it might be said: the voice suffices. While almost every performer whose albums sell in the millions calls upon an entertainer's bag of tricks, from telling jokes to dancing to circus pyrotechnics, Ms. Houston would rather just stand there and sing."

With regard to her singing style, he added: "Her [Houston's] stylistic trademark—shivery melismas that ripple up in the middle of a song, twirling embellishments at the ends of phrases that suggest an almost breathless exhilaration—infuse her interpretations with flashes of musical and emotional lightning."

Andrew Chan of Slant Magazine wrote of her voice during live performances, "The labor of singing was not only apparent in her body language, it was also what made her such a presence on stage. On high notes she would tilt her head back, exposing her swan neck and the musculature rushing in to produce all that volume. Leaps into her silvery head voice were punctuated with a closing of the eyes, a wiggle of the fingers."

== Other ventures ==
=== Business ventures and endorsements ===
In 1986, Houston started her own management company, Nippy Inc. The company, which Houston's father John was president, was created to handle her business affairs. It managed her musical publishing, recordings and special projects throughout her career. The company helped to manage most of her musical work, starting with the Whitney album in 1987. In 1995, Houston founded BrownHouse Productions, a film production company, with Debra Martin Chase as a co-partner. It was originally named Houston Productions before settling on BrownHouse by 1997. The company's goal was to produce films and TV shows aimed at a predominantly African American audience. Through that company, Houston and Chase helped to produce two different film franchises, The Princess Diaries and The Cheetah Girls, while also producing the TV miniseries, Cinderella and the 2012 film, Sparkle, the latter being the last project Houston was involved in before her death. Houston and Chase also planned films with Will Smith, Monica and Aaliyah, none of which came to fruition, along with a planned biopic on actress Dorothy Dandridge. In 1998, Houston formed her own label, Better Place Records, having signed the R&B girl group Sunday and singer Shanna.

Starting in 1983, Houston began to get involved in commercials. Her first commercial, prior to reaching stardom, was as a singing waitress for the soft drink Canada Dry. She followed that up with performing the jingle to the restaurant Steak & Ale in at least two commercials throughout 1985, the same year her debut album was issued. In 1986, Houston became a soda pitchwoman, endorsing the Diet Coke soft drink, singing its "Just for the Taste of It" jingle. Two years later, in 1988, she did a second Diet Coke commercial that proved to be even more popular. It was later referenced in a parody by singer Neil Young in the music video for the song, "This Note's for You" in the musician's critique of "corporate rock" commercials. That same year, Houston did a European commercial endorsing Diet Coke's parent brand, Coca-Cola, to the tune of "Greatest Love of All". A year later, Houston performed her composition, "Takin' a Chance", for the Japanese brand Sanyo in several ads that aired on television throughout the country. In 1994, Houston endorsed the telephone company AT&T, performing its "True Voice" jingle. In 1999 and 2000, Houston endorsed the Japanese company Nissin, a non-bank finance company that lends to consumers and small businesses in Japan, with the company's slogan "Make it happen with Nissin".

=== Philanthropy and activism ===
Houston was a long-time supporter of charities around the world. In 1989, she established the Whitney Houston Foundation for Children. It offered medical assistance to sick and homeless children, fought to prevent child abuse, taught children to read, created inner-city parks and playgrounds and granted college scholarships, including one to the Juilliard School. At a 1988 Madison Square Garden concert, Houston earned more than $250,000 for the United Negro College Fund (UNCF). For her efforts, Houston received the UNCF Frederick D. Patterson Award in March 1990. In October 1988, Houston performed on the Channel Seven Perth Telethon in Perth to raise funds for several children's hospitals there. The following November, Houston announced plans to invest in a $100 million housing project set up by Vogue Skyview Estates, a real estate development firm, to create low and middle-income housing in her hometown of Newark, New Jersey. The Feingold Center for Children in Boston had its Hearing & Language Disorder Clinic renamed after the singer after she contributed to the hospital. In June 1995, it was reported that Houston donated $125,000 to Harlem's Hale House Center to help mothers who were at risk of abusing their children. Later, the Hale House Center built a Learning & Recreation Center due to Houston's donations. Houston also donated money to the St. Jude Children's Research Hospital. Newark's University Hospital renamed its Pediatric Special Care Unit the Whitney Houston Intensive Care Unit after Houston's contributions to the hospital.

Houston donated all of the earnings from her 1991 Super Bowl XXV performance of "The Star-Spangled Banner" sales to Gulf War servicemen and their families. The record label followed suit and she was voted to the American Red Cross Board of Directors as a result. Following the terrorist attacks in 2001, Houston re-released "The Star-Spangled Banner" to support the New York Firefighters 9/11 Disaster Relief Fund and the New York Fraternal Order of Police. She waived her royalty rights to the song, which reached number one on charts in October 2001 and generated more than $1 million. Houston declined to perform in apartheid-era South Africa in the 1980s. Her participation at the 1988 Freedomfest performance in London (for a then-imprisoned Nelson Mandela) grabbed the attention of other musicians and the media. During her historic South African tour in 1994, Houston donated all of its concert proceeds to numerous children's charities, including two children's museums, the President's Trust Fund (for Nelson Mandela) and the Kasigo Trust among several orphanages.

In addition, Houston became an activist for the fight against HIV and AIDS during the first decade of the AIDS epidemic. In 1986, the LGBT magazine publication The Advocate reported that one of Houston's concerts at the Boston Common in Boston raised $30,000 for the AIDS Action Committee of Massachusetts and the Gay and Lesbian Counseling Service. The Whitney Houston Foundation for Children, in particular, focused on helping children who suffered from HIV/AIDS, among other issues. In 1990, Houston took part in Arista Records' 15th anniversary gala, which was an AIDS benefit, where she sang "I Wanna Dance with Somebody (Who Loves Me)", "Greatest Love of All" and, with cousin Dionne Warwick, "That's What Friends Are For". A year later, Houston participated in the Reach Out & Touch Someone AIDS vigil at London in September 1991 while she was finishing her historic ten-date residency at London's Wembley Arena; there, she stressed the importance of AIDS research and addressing HIV stigma.

In June 1999, Houston gave a surprise performance at the 13th Annual New York City Lesbian & Gay Pride Dance at one of the city's West Side piers. According to Instinct magazine, Houston's unannounced performance at the Piers "ushered in a new era that would eventually make high-profile artists performing at LGBTQ events virtually commonplace". Before hitting the stage, Houston was asked by MTV veejay John Norris why she decided to attend the event. Houston replied, "We're all God's children, honey".

== Personal life ==
=== Religion ===
Houston was a Christian and she made it a point to sing gospel songs in her concerts. During her childhood, she regularly attended New Hope Baptist Church where she joined the children's choir and later performed solos on a regular basis there. Houston's mother Cissy wrote that while at New Hope, Houston "got saved" and she later told her that she "accepted the Savior into her life" at around thirteen years old. Houston's recording of "Do You Hear What I Hear", from the Christmas compilation album, A Very Special Christmas (1987), has constantly appeared on the Billboard gospel charts since 2011. In 1997, Houston was given a special honor from the Dove Awards for helping to bring gospel music to the attention of the mainstream. Two of Houston's final recordings—"His Eye Is on the Sparrow" and "Celebrate", from the 2012 film, Sparkle—posthumously made the Billboard gospel charts. Her last public performance prior to her death was an impromptu duet of "Jesus Loves Me" with friend and former collaborator Kelly Price at the Tru nightclub in Hollywood.

=== Relationships, marriage, and family ===
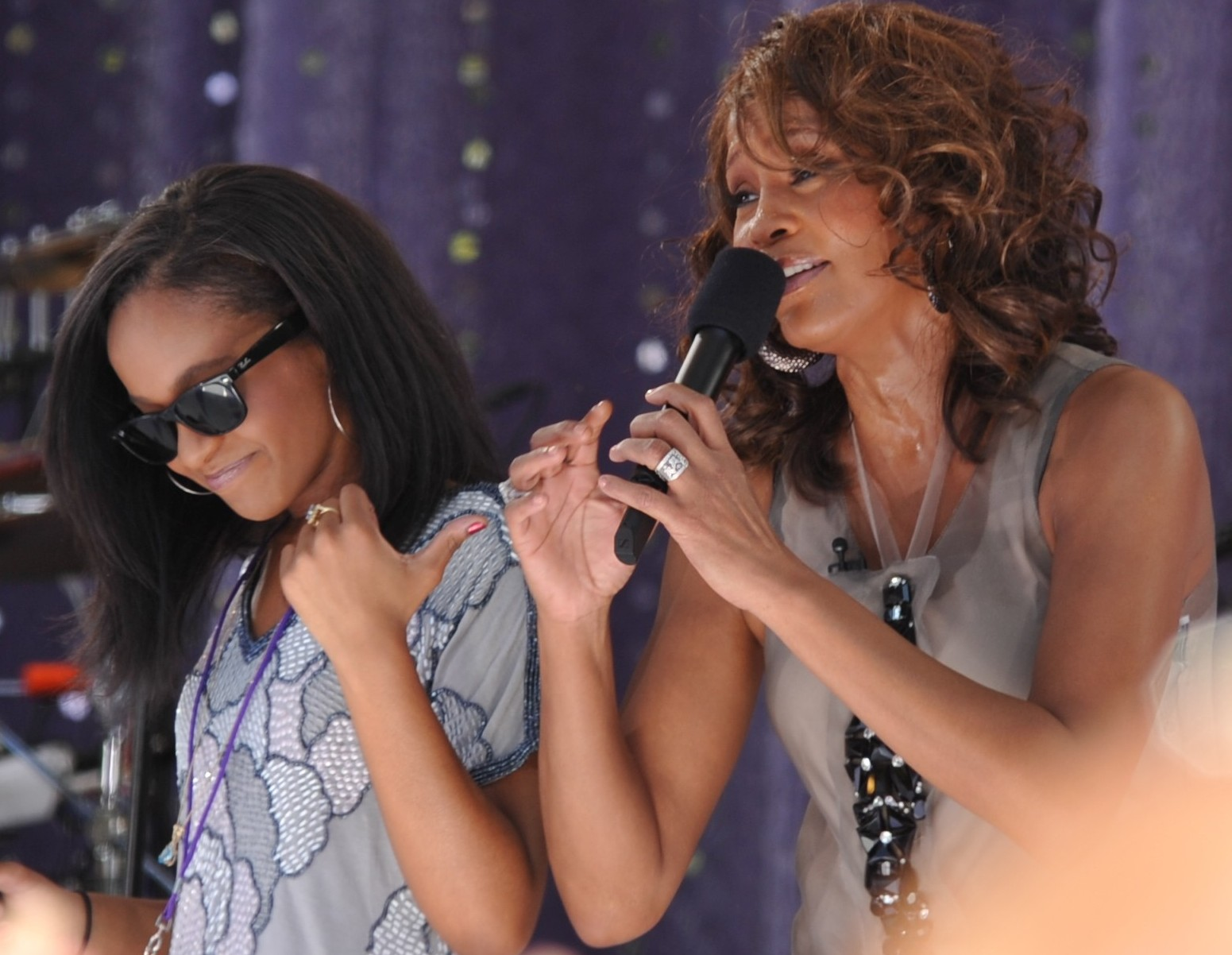
Houston and her daughter Bobbi Kristina Brown in 2009

Houston first met Robyn Crawford when Crawford was 19 and Houston was 16; the two were summer camp counselors at the East Orange Community Development Center in East Orange, New Jersey. According to Crawford, the two were romantically involved for a few years until Houston began seeking a recording contract. Crawford and Houston continued their professional relationship and platonic friendship until Crawford left Houston's employ in 2000.

In the 1980s, Houston was romantically linked to musician Jermaine Jackson, American football star Randall Cunningham, and actor Eddie Murphy.

In July 2012, it was reported that rapper MC Hammer was encouraged to marry Houston by her father John during Super Bowl XXV in January 1991, despite the fact that Hammer was already a married man with children; Houston and Hammer maintained a friendship until Houston's death.

Houston met R&B singer Bobby Brown at the 1989 Soul Train Music Awards. After a three-year courtship, the two were married on July 18, 1992. The two singers occasionally collaborated on songs, including the hit record, "Something in Common". The following year, Houston gave birth to their daughter Bobbi Kristina Brown (March 4, 1993 – July 26, 2015), the couple's only child.

While they were married, Brown had several run-ins with the law for drunken driving, drug possession and battery, including some jail time. In December 2003, Brown was charged with battery following an altercation during which he threatened to beat Houston and then assaulted her. Police reported that Houston had visible injuries to her face.

Starting in April of the following year, the reality show Being Bobby Brown was taped and later premiered on Bravo, in June 2005. The show drew criticism for what critics perceived to be unflattering moments from the couple, but still achieved high ratings. However, the show was not renewed for a second season after Houston declined further participation. In September 2006, a year after Being Bobby Brown aired, Houston filed for legal separation from Brown, later filing for divorce the following month, citing irreconcilable differences. The divorce was granted on April 24, 2007.

=== Sexuality ===
Houston's sexuality was a heavily debated and discussed topic throughout the singer's career. Rumors of her sexual orientation hit gossip columns almost immediately after Houston's debut album became a hit in 1985. Houston's relationship with Robyn Crawford was a popular topic, in particular. In the late 1980s, tabloid magazines claimed Houston was involved in a love triangle with actresses Jodie Foster and Kelly McGillis. In 2009, McGillis publicly came out as lesbian and denied the Houston-Foster rumor, claiming she never met Houston.

In multiple interviews, when broached about it, Houston would deny being gay and lesbian. Following her death, some former employees and family members claimed Houston was either bisexual or at least "sexually fluid".

Robyn Crawford wrote in her 2019 memoirs, A Song for You: My Life with Whitney Houston, that the two "never talked about labels, like lesbian or gay. We just lived our lives and I hoped it could go on that way forever." Crawford stated later in an interview while promoting her book that Houston's quick dismissive attitude towards questions of her sexuality were due to the singer "reject[ing] all labels". Scottish director Kevin Macdonald, director of the estate-approved documentary, Whitney (2018), concluded Houston wasn't gay but that she was fluid in her sexuality since he believed she didn't fit any label.

=== Legal issues ===
On April 19, 1991, at the start of her I'm Your Baby Tonight World Tour, Houston and her brother Michael got involved in an altercation with three men at a hotel in Lexington, Kentucky, after the men reportedly sought her for an autograph while they were trying to watch a heavyweight boxing championship match. After seeing the men attack her brother, Houston reportedly jumped on one of the men, Ransom Brotherton, and punched him off her brother before Houston and her entourage fled from the hotel. Brotherton reported the incident, which led to him having to go to the hospital to receive "12 stitches over his left eye". Houston was charged with fourth degree assault for attacking Brotherton and "threatening to kill him", while her brother was charged with assaulting another man involved in the melee, Kevin Owens.

Charges were dropped against the Houstons in May due to "contradictory evidence" and due to the prosecution struggling to "prove them guilty". It was later revealed that the altercation began after the three men yelled racial slurs at Houston.

On January 11, 2000, while Houston was traveling with her husband Bobby Brown, airport security guards discovered half an ounce of marijuana in her handbag at Keahole-Kona International Airport in Hawaii. She departed before authorities could arrive. Houston was initially charged with a misdemeanor drug charge that carried a 30-day sentence and a $1,000 fine. The charges, however, were dropped in March 2001 after prosecutors received a substance abuse assessment from a counselor in New Jersey that stated the singer did not need treatment for substance abuse.

In 2002, Houston became embroiled in a legal dispute with John Houston Enterprise, a company started by her father. The company, run by Kevin Skinner, sued her for $100 million, claiming unpaid compensation. Houston's father died in February 2003, and the lawsuit was dismissed in April 2004, with no compensation awarded.

=== FBI files ===
FBI documents from 1988 to 1999 revealed that Houston was the target of both an alleged blackmail scheme and obsessive fan attention at the height of her career. The documents reveal that a lawyer from Chicago demanded up to $250,000 to keep "certain details" of her private life out of the press. The FBI eventually closed the case, after Houston and her father described the sender as a friend and reached a private agreement. The documents also include unsettling correspondence from devoted admirers whose letters and claims, including one who professed love in dozens of messages, leading to FBI inquiries, that were later classified as non-threatening.

=== Residences ===
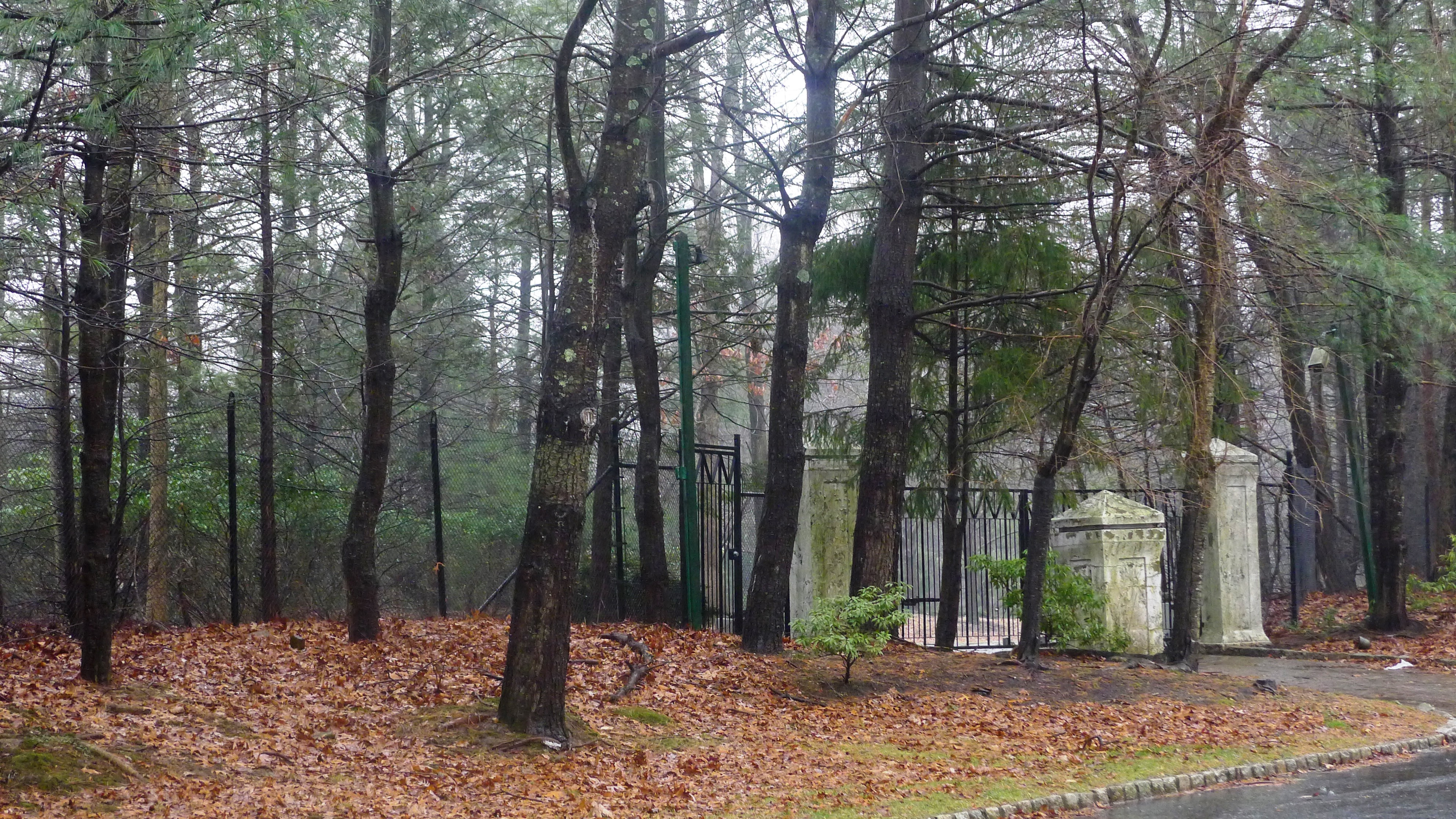
The front entrance of Houston's Mendham Township home.

Following graduation from Mount Saint Dominic Academy in 1981, Houston moved to a two-bedroom apartment at Woodbridge Township with Robyn Crawford that October.

By early 1986, Houston had relocated to a bigger apartment in Fort Lee, just minutes away from Manhattan. The apartment would later be used as the official headquarters of her management and production company, Nippy Inc., which Houston formed in late 1986, and with whom her father presided over during the company's duration.

With help from her father, Houston purchased a mansion in Mendham Township, located at 22 North Gate Road, in late 1987. The 13,607-square-foot house had been built the year prior to Houston purchasing the property.

The house was the primary location for Houston and Bobby Brown's 1992 wedding as well as its driveway being the site where Houston took the photo for the cover of her 1998 album, My Love Is Your Love.

In 1993, Houston purchased a second home in the township, located at 1 Cross Way. The home served as the singer's personal recording studio at which she recorded her material, prominently the recordings of The Preacher's Wife, My Love Is Your Love and Just Whitney.

During the latter years of her marriage to Brown, Houston lived in Alpharetta, Georgia, a suburb of Atlanta, splitting time between there and Mendham. In 2003, the couple purchased a mansion in Alpharetta, where much of the taping of the reality series, Being Bobby Brown, was filmed.

Following her separation from Brown, Houston rented a palatial house in Laguna Hills, California in April 2006 and lived there until 2008.

Houston's last house prior to her death was an Alpharetta-based townhouse that was co-owned by Houston's daughter. Houston also owned a condo at Williams Island in Aventura, Florida, a suburb of Miami.

=== Health ===
During her marriage, Houston suffered several miscarriages, including one during the filming of The Bodyguard, another in July 1994, and another in December 1996.

In June 1993, the New York Post reported that Houston overdosed on diet pills in an attempt to lose weight following the birth of her daughter and had been treated at a Miami-area hospital. The following day after the Post article was published, Houston denied the allegations through her lawyer Sheldon Platt, with Platt stating, "she has never taken a diet pill in her life. She's outraged. She's hurt." Platt also denied Houston had been taken to the hospital, adding "the article is completely wrong - not accurate - completely out of whack. None of this has happened."

Rolling Stone published a story in June 2000 stating that Cissy Houston and others had held a July 1999 intervention in which they unsuccessfully attempted to persuade Whitney to obtain drug treatment.

In her 2019 memoir A Song for You: My Life with Whitney Houston, Houston's longtime executive assistant and friend, Robyn Crawford, said she departed from Houston's management company after Houston declined to seek help for her drug dependency; years earlier, Houston claimed in an interview that the two friends parted ways over Houston's husband, Bobby Brown.

In September 2001, Houston's extremely thin appearance led to rumors about her health. Her publicist Nancy Seltzer stated, "Whitney has been under stress due to family matters and when she is under stress she doesn't eat." In 2009, Houston acknowledged that drug use had been the reason for her weight loss in 2001.

In 2002, Houston gave an interview with Diane Sawyer to promote her upcoming album. During the interview, she addressed rumors of drug use, famously saying, "crack is whack". She admitted to using various substances but denied having an eating disorder.

In September 2009, Houston was interviewed by Oprah Winfrey. In the interview, she admitted to using drugs with Brown during their marriage and described her struggles with addiction. She told Winfrey that before The Bodyguard her drug use was light, that she used drugs more heavily after the film's success and the birth of her daughter, and that by 1996 "[doing drugs] was an everyday thing ... I wasn't happy by that point in time. I was losing myself." Houston told Winfrey that she had attended a 30-day rehabilitation program. Houston also acknowledged to Winfrey that her drug use had continued after rehabilitation, and that at one point, her mother obtained a court order and the assistance of law enforcement to press her into receiving further drug treatment. Houston's mother recalled the incident in her 2013 book, Remembering Whitney: My Story of Love, Loss, and the Night the Music Stopped; when she visited her daughter's Alpharetta residence in 2005, the walls were "spray-painted" with "big glaring eyes and strange faces. Evil eyes, staring out like a threat", and most of her daughter's head was cut out of a framed photo. Houston herself explained it in her interview with Winfrey. When Winfrey asked Houston if she was drug-free, Houston responded, "'Yes, ma'am. I mean, you know, don't think I don't have desires for it.'"

In May 2011, Houston enrolled in rehabilitation again due to drug and alcohol problems, which she stated was part of her "longstanding recovery process". A month later, it was reported that Houston had been diagnosed with emphysema.

== Death ==
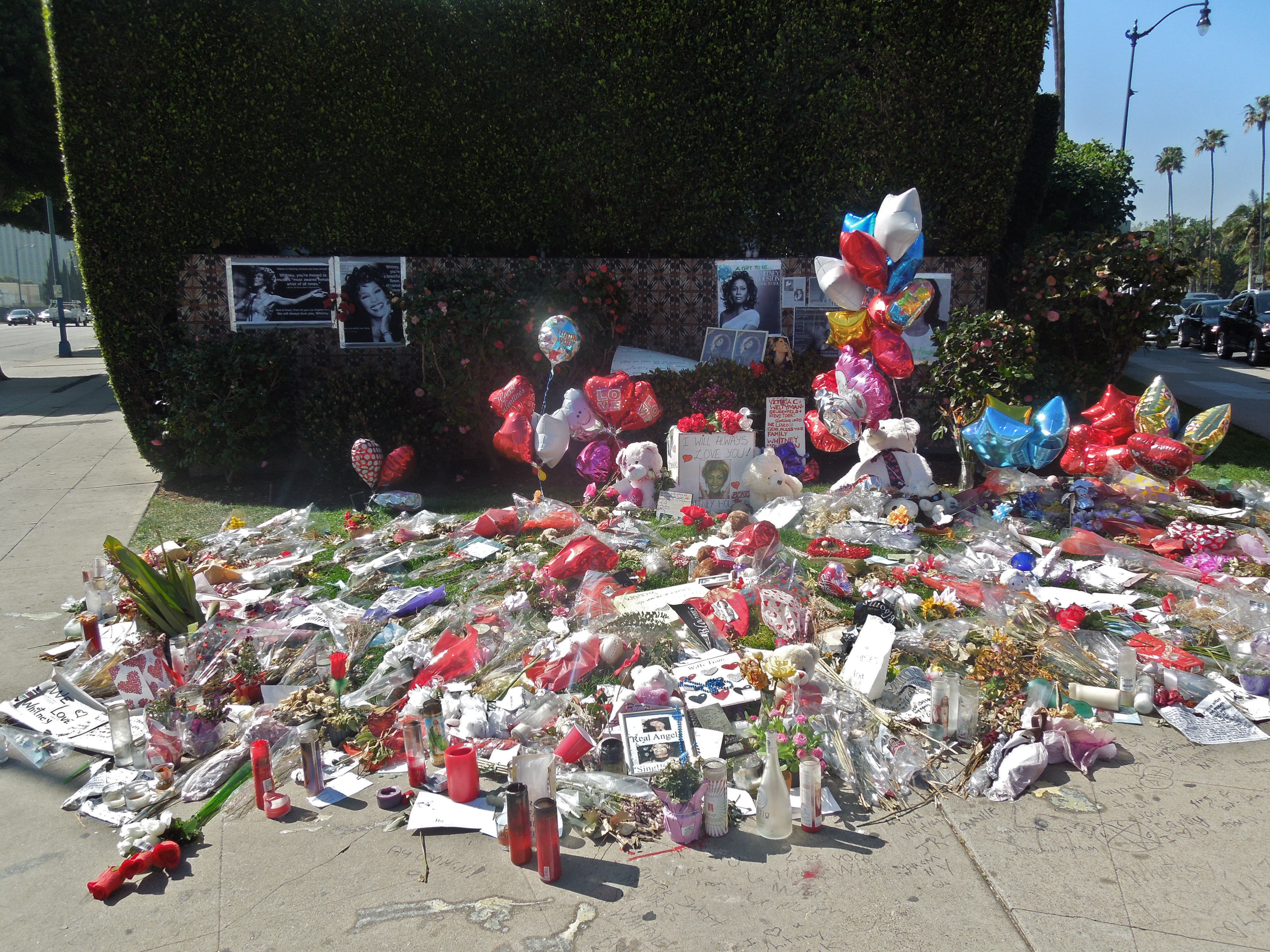
Flowers near the Beverly Hilton Hotel

On February 11, 2012, Houston was found unconscious in Suite 434 at the Beverly Hilton, submerged in the bathtub. Houston reportedly appeared "disheveled" and "erratic" in the days before her death. Beverly Hills paramedics arrived about 3:30 pm, found Houston unresponsive, and performed CPR. Houston was pronounced dead at 3:55 pm PST. The cause of death was not immediately known; local police said there were "no obvious signs of criminal intent". On March 22, 2012, the Los Angeles County Coroner's Office reported that Houston's death was caused by drowning and the "effects of atherosclerotic heart disease and cocaine use". The manner of death was listed as "accident".

A few minutes after the Associated Press sent out a breaking news alert on Twitter (X) with the news confirmed by Houston's publicist at 4:57 p.m. PT, ABC, CBS, NBC, CNN, MSNBC, Fox News, BBC News, and Sky News all interrupted their programming to cover Houston's death, featuring interviews with those who knew her. The first hour after the news of her death saw 2,481,652 X (Twitter) posts (18% of all tweets) and all of the trending topics mentioned Houston. Within 24 hours it had reached 35 million tweets, making it the most-tweeted breaking-news event in the history of X (Twitter). Her death also brought 1,532,302 hits per hour to her Wikipedia article, the highest peak traffic on any article since at least January 2010.

The 54th Annual Grammy Awards took place the day following her death and included a tribute to Houston; it was later credited for the Grammys' second-highest ratings in history. The February 11, 2012, Clive Davis pre-Grammy party that Houston had been expected to attend, which featured many of the biggest names in music and film, went on as scheduled, although it was quickly turned into a tribute to Houston. Numerous other public figures also expressed their grief, including Mariah Carey, Quincy Jones, Darlene Love, Aretha Franklin and Oprah Winfrey. Houston's death was covered internationally in the media, as was her memorial service, which was held for Houston at her home church, New Hope Baptist Church, in Newark, New Jersey, on February 18, 2012. Her assets at the time, earned over a 25-year career, amounted to $250 million.

Houston's music surged in popularity. According to representatives from Houston's record label, Houston sold 8 million records worldwide in the first 10 months of the year she died. The single "I Will Always Love You" returned to the Billboard Hot 100 after almost 20 years, peaking at number three and becoming the first posthumous top-10 single since 2001. Houston set a Guinness World Record for a female artist by having 10 albums inside the Billboard 200 simultaneously. In October 2023, Houston made the list of the top ten highest-earning posthumous celebrities on Forbes, earning $30 million, later winning a Guinness World Records entry as the highest-earning posthumous female, her 32nd record.

== Legacy ==
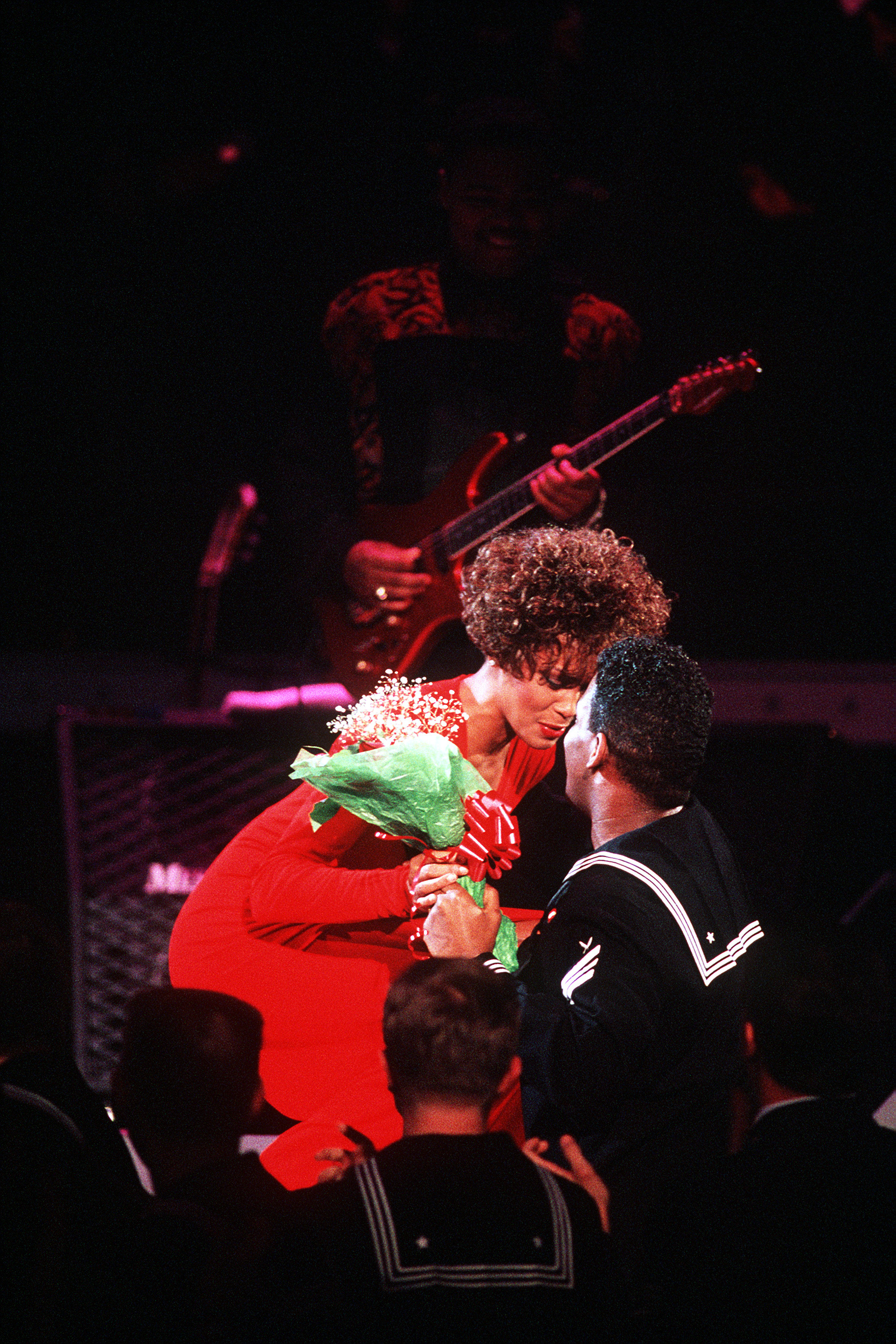
Houston performing "Where Do Broken Hearts Go" during her HBO-televised concert "Welcome Home Heroes"

Houston has been regarded as one of the greatest vocalists of all time and a cultural icon. She is also recognized as one of the most influential R&B artists in history. ABC News described Houston as a "revolutionary artist who enchanted audiences with her iconic voice –– and kicked down the door for Black artists who followed her." Julianne MacNeill of Woman's World magazine credited Houston with "single-handedly changing the world of pop and R&B music". During the 1980s, MTV was coming into its own and received criticism for not playing enough videos by black artists. With Michael Jackson breaking down the color barrier for black men, Houston did the same for black women. She became the first black woman to receive heavy rotation on the network following the success of the "How Will I Know" video. Stephen Holden of The New York Times said that Houston "revitalized the tradition of strong gospel-oriented pop-soul singing". Ann Powers of the Los Angeles Times referred to Houston's voice as a "national treasure".

The Independent's music critic Andy Gill also wrote about Houston's influence on modern R&B and singing competitions, comparing it to Michael Jackson's, stating that "Jackson was a hugely talented icon, certainly, but he will be as well remembered (probably more so) for his presentational skills, his dazzling dance moves, as for his musical innovations. Whitney, on the other hand, just sang and the ripples from her voice continue to dominate the pop landscape." Gill said that there "are few, if any, Jackson imitators on today's TV talent shows, but every other contestant is a Whitney wannabe, desperately attempting to emulate that wondrous combination of vocal effects – the flowing melisma, the soaring mezzo-soprano confidence, the tremulous fluttering that carried the ends of lines into realms of higher yearning".

According to Linda Lister in Divafication: The Deification of Modern Female Pop Stars, she has been called the "Queen of Pop" for her influence during the 1990s, commercially rivaling Mariah Carey and Celine Dion. Rolling Stone stated that Houston "redefined the image of a female soul icon and inspired singers ranging from Mariah Carey to Rihanna". In 2013, ABC named Houston the greatest woman in music. She was ranked among the greatest women in music by VH1. In 2016, CNN listed her as one of the most romantic singers of the 20th century. Houston's entrance into the music industry is considered one of the 25 musical milestones of the last 25 years, according to USA Today in 2007. It stated that she paved the way for Mariah Carey's chart-topping vocal gymnastics. Many major publications including the Rock and Roll Hall of Fame, Fox News, NBC News and The Independent dubbed Houston the "greatest singer of her generation". Despite his opposition to music, Osama Bin Laden was reportedly fond of Whitney Houston. According to poet and activist Kola Boof, bin Laden wanted to make her one of his wives. In February 2025, Donald Trump announced plans to build a statue of Houston among a slew of others for the proposed National Garden of American Heroes, that would be implemented in 2026.

== Achievements ==
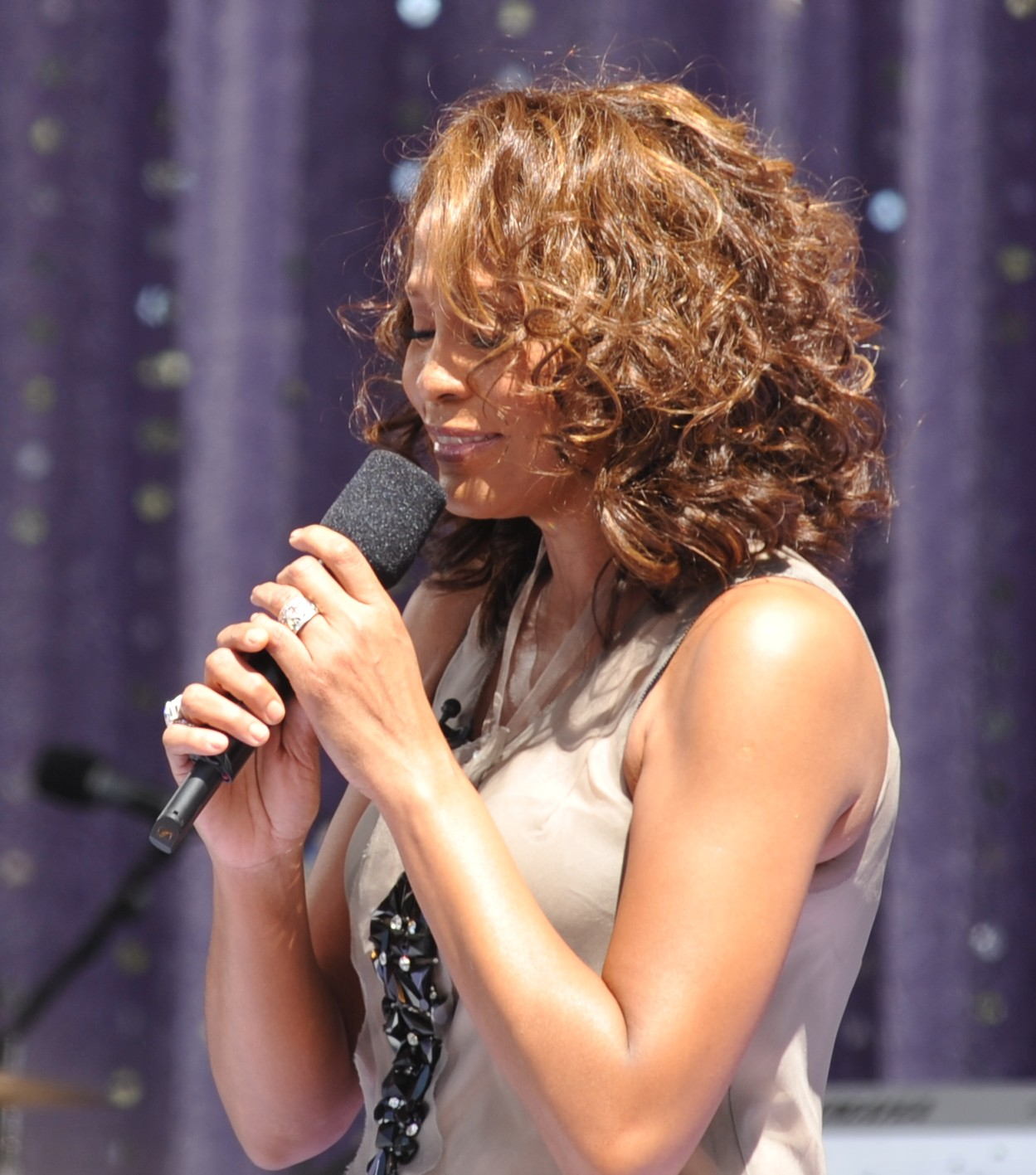
Houston in 2009

Houston is one of the most awarded entertainers of all time, she won numerous accolades throughout her career, including two Emmy Awards, five World Music Awards, nine Grammy Awards (including two Grammy Hall of Fame inductions and the Grammy Lifetime Achievement Award), 16 Billboard Music Awards (36 Billboard awards in all) and 22 American Music Awards. Houston currently holds the record for most American Music Awards in a single night with eight, a record for a woman and tied in general with Michael Jackson. Houston was the first artist to win more than 11 Billboard awards in one night at its fourth annual ceremony in 1993, which set a Guinness World Record at the time. Houston continues to hold the record for the most WMAs won in a single year, winning five trophies at the sixth World Music Awards in 1994. Houston is also the black female artist with the most Guinness World Records in history with 33.

A premier black female entertainer, Houston was inducted into the BET Walk of Fame and the Soul Train Hall of Fame. In 2001, Houston became the first artist to receive the BET Lifetime Achievement Award. In 2010, she was honored at The BET Honors with the Entertainers Award. In 2008, Billboard magazine released a list of the Hot 100 All-Time Top Artists to celebrate the US singles chart's 50th anniversary, ranking Houston at number nine. In November 2010, Billboard released its "Top 50 R&B/Hip-Hop Artists of the Past 25 Years" list and ranked Houston at number three who not only went on to earn eight number-one singles on the R&B/Hip-Hop Songs chart, but also landed five number ones on R&B/Hip-Hop Albums. The magazine later ranked her the 69th "Greatest Female Artist of the 21st Century". Houston is one of the longest-running acts on the US Billboard charts, with a total of 692 weeks on the Billboard Hot 100 and 1,064 weeks on the Billboard 200.

Houston is one of the best-selling recording artists of all time, with more than 220 million records sold worldwide. She was ranked the best-selling female R&B artist of the 20th century by the RIAA in 1999. Houston sold more physical singles than any other female solo artist in history. As of 2026, she is ranked as one of the best-selling artists in the United States by the RIAA with 62 million certified albums. Houston released seven studio albums and two soundtrack albums, all of which have been certified diamond, multi-platinum or platinum.

Houston became the first female artist to go diamond with an album after her soundtrack to The Bodyguard went ten-times platinum in November 1993. In January 1994, her debut album Whitney Houston was the first studio album by a woman to be certified ten-times platinum, making her the first solo artist to receive two diamond-certified albums. When her second album, Whitney (1987), was certified diamond in October 2020, Houston became the first black recording artist in history to have three diamond-certified albums. Those three albums are also among the best-selling albums of all time. Houston is the only black female artist with six albums to sell more than ten million units worldwide, the third most in general by a female artist. The Bodyguard remains the best-selling soundtrack and best-selling female album of all time, with global units of over 45 million, while "I Will Always Love You" remains the best-selling single by a female artist at 24 million units worldwide. In addition, her soundtrack for The Preacher's Wife is the best-selling gospel release ever.

She held an honorary Doctorate in Humanities from Grambling State University, Louisiana. Houston was inducted into the New Jersey Hall of Fame in 2013. She was inducted into the official Rhythm and Blues Hall of Fame in its second class in 2014. In 2020, Houston was inducted into the Rock and Roll Hall of Fame after her first nomination. In October 2020, the music video for "I Will Always Love You" surpassed 1 billion views on YouTube, making Houston the first solo 20th-century artist to have a video reach that milestone. In May 2023, Houston was one of the first of 13 artists to be given the Brits Billion Award by the BPI for reaching 1 billion career streams in the United Kingdom. Houston is one of only a handful of artists from the 20th century to have multiple songs streamed a billion times on Spotify with her 1987 hit, "I Wanna Dance with Somebody (Who Loves Me)", her posthumous 2019 hit, "Higher Love" and her famous 1992 rendition of "I Will Always Love You" reaching the feat in 2023, 2024 and 2026. In September 2025, Houston was inducted into the Gospel Music Hall of Fame Missouri at St. Louis, Missouri. In January 2026, Houston received the Grammy Lifetime Achievement Award. In February 2026, Houston's music video to "I Have Nothing" surpassed a billion views, her second video to do so.

== Commemoration ==
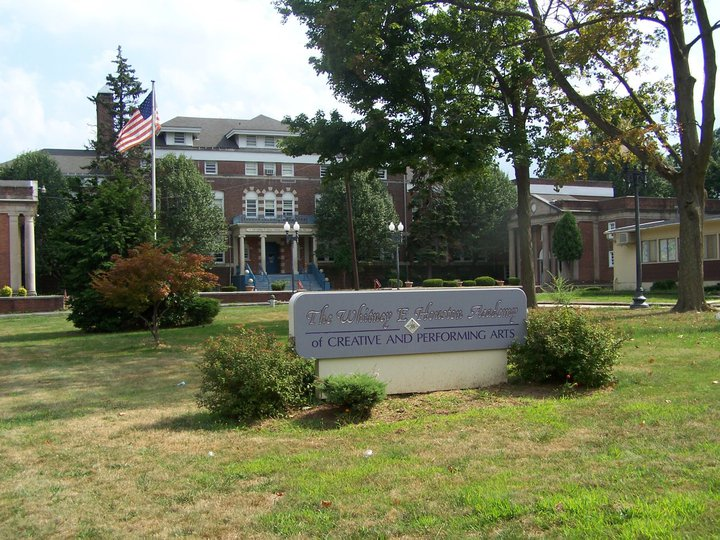
Whitney E. Houston Academy of Creative & Performing Arts

- In 1997, the Franklin School in East Orange, New Jersey, which Houston attended as a child, was renamed to the Whitney E. Houston Academy of Creative & Performing Arts.
- In 2014, the Hatfield Orchids registered a new cymbidium hybrid orchid in the Royal Horticultural Society (RHS) under the name Cymbidium Whitney Houston named after Houston.
- Five posthumous albums have been released, including three compilation albums and two live albums. A posthumous concert tour, An Evening with Whitney: The Whitney Houston Hologram Tour, featuring a projected image of Houston, ran from 2020 to 2023.
- Madame Tussauds unveiled four wax figures of Houston in 2013, inspired by her looks from the music video of I Wanna Dance with Somebody (Who Loves Me), film The Bodyguard, album cover of I Will Always Love You: The Best of Whitney Houston and The Star-Spangled Banner performance at the 1991 Super Bowl.
- In 2015, Lifetime premiered the biographical film Whitney. Houston was portrayed by model Yaya DaCosta.
- In 2016, Houston's musical legacy was honored at the National Museum of African American History and Culture at the Smithsonian Institution in Washington, D.C., with several artifacts of Houston throughout her career donated from her estate being displayed in its Musical Crossroads gallery.
- A television documentary film entitled Whitney: Can I Be Me aired on Showtime on August 25, 2017. The film was directed by Nick Broomfield.
- Whitney, a documentary film based on Houston's life and death, premiered at the 2018 Cannes Film Festival and was released internationally in theaters on July 6, 2018.
- In 2019, Houston and Kygo's version of "Higher Love" was released as a single. It reached number two on the UK Singles Chart and reached the top 10 in several countries.
- Lifetime released the documentary Whitney Houston & Bobbi Kristina: Didn't We Almost Have It All in 2021.
- A mural of Houston, made of hand cut glass by artist Maude Lemaire, was installed at 45 Williams Street, Newark, New Jersey, in 2021.
- On August 11, 2021, Houston was the first profile of the ABC documentary series, Superstar, with interviews from Brandy, BeBe Winans, Chaka Khan, Narada Michael Walden, Darlene Love and Savion Glover.
- On the tenth anniversary of her death, ESPN ran a 30-minute documentary of Houston's acclaimed performance of The Star Spangled Banner at Super Bowl XXV in 1991 titled Whitney's Anthem.
- Starting in February 2022, on the tenth anniversary of her death, Funko Pop! released the first of what would be four Funko Pop figurines of Houston in her outfit from the "How Will I Know" music video, followed by her Super Bowl XXV tracksuit outfit the following March, her laid back pink gown from her debut album that June and her outfit from the "I Wanna Dance with Somebody (Who Loves Me)" music video that August, on the day before what would've been her 59th birthday.
- Whitney Houston: I Wanna Dance with Somebody, a biographical film, opened on December 23, 2022, with Houston being portrayed by Naomi Ackie. It grossed around $60 million.
- In December 2023, the New Jersey Hall of Fame unveiled the Whitney Houston Service Area, formerly known as the Vauxhal Service Area at the Garden State Parkway. The New Jersey Hall of Fame explained that the renaming was part of their "ongoing program to honor its inductees by renaming Garden State Parkway service areas after them, and building displays about them".
- In May 2025, it was announced by Houston's estate that The Voice of Whitney: A Symphonic Celebration, which integrates Houston's vocal recordings with the backing of an orchestra, will embark on a full length North American tour starting in September 2025.
- In September 2025, Calum Scott released a reimagined duet ballad rendition of "I Wanna Dance with Somebody (Who Loves Me)" with Houston.
- In what would've been Houston's 63rd birthday in August 2026, Mattel unveiled its official Barbie doll of Houston replicating her look from her famed 1987 music video of "I Wanna Dance with Somebody (Who Loves Me)".

== Discography ==
- Whitney Houston (1985)
- Whitney (1987)
- I'm Your Baby Tonight (1990)
- My Love Is Your Love (1998)
- Just Whitney (2002)
- One Wish: The Holiday Album (2003)
- I Look to You (2009)

== Filmography ==
Films starred

- The Bodyguard (1992)
- Waiting to Exhale (1995)
- The Preacher's Wife (1996)
- Cinderella (1997)
- Sparkle (2012)

Films produced

- Cinderella (1997)
- The Princess Diaries (2001)
- The Cheetah Girls (2003)
- The Princess Diaries 2: Royal Engagement (2004)
- The Cheetah Girls 2 (2006)
- Sparkle (2012)

Documentaries and others

- Nora's Hair Salon (2004)
- The Concert for a New South Africa (Durban) (2024)

=== Biographical adaptations ===
==== Documentaries ====
- Whitney: Can I Be Me (2017)
- Whitney (2018)

==== Feature films ====
- Whitney (2015)
- Whitney Houston: I Wanna Dance with Somebody (2022)

== Tours ==
=== Headlining tours ===
- US Tour (1985)
- The Greatest Love World Tour (1986)
- Moment of Truth World Tour (1987–1988)
- Feels So Right Tour (1990)
- I'm Your Baby Tonight World Tour (1991)
- The Bodyguard World Tour (1993–1994)
- Pacific Rim Tour (1997)
- The European Tour (1998)
- My Love Is Your Love World Tour (1999)
- Nothing but Love World Tour (2009–2010)

=== Tribute tours ===
- An Evening with Whitney: The Whitney Houston Hologram Tour (2020–2023)

=== Co-headlining tours ===
- Soul Divas Tour (2004)

== See also ==
- List of American Grammy Award winners and nominees
- List of artists who reached number one in the United States
- List of artists who reached number one on the U.S. dance chart
- Artists with the most number-ones on the U.S. Dance Club Songs chart
- List of artists with the most number-one European singles
- List of artists who have spent the most weeks on the UK music charts
- List of accolades received by Whitney Houston
- List of best-selling albums
- List of best-selling music artists
- List of best-selling gospel music artists
- List of best-selling singles
- List of Rock and Roll Hall of Fame inductees

== Bibliography ==
- Cox, Ted (1999). Whitney Houston: Black Americans of Achievement. Chelsea House Publishers. ISBN 0-7910-4456-4.
- Heppermann, Christine (2012). Whitney Houston: Recording Artist & Actress. ABDO Publishing. ISBN 9781614801733.
- Parish, James Robert (2003). Whitney Houston: The Unauthorized Biography. Aurum Press. ISBN 1-85410-921-9.
- Seal, Richard (1994). Whitney Houston: One Moment in Time. Britannia Press Publishing. ISBN 0-9519937-8-X.
