= Whitney: Can I Be Me =

2017 documentary film directed by Rudi Dolezal and Nick Broomfield

- Film Poster
- Directed by: Nick Broomfield; Rudi Dolezal
- Written by: Nick Broomfield
- Produced by: Nick Broomfield; Marc Hoeferlin
- Starring: Whitney Houston
- Cinematography: Sam Mitchell
- Edited by: Marc Hoeferlin
- Music by: Nick Laird-Clowes
- Production companies: Lafayette Films; Passion Pictures; Showtime Networks
- Distributed by: BBC (UK) (TV); Showtime Networks (USA) (TV)
- Release dates: April 24, 2017 (Italy); April 27, 2017 (Tribeca Film Festival); June 16, 2017 (UK)
- Running time: 105 minutes
- Countries: United States; United Kingdom
- Languages: English; French

Whitney: Can I Be Me is a 2017 British-American documentary film that was written, co-produced by Nick Broomfield and directed by Broomfield and Rudi Dolezal. The film's subject is the life and career of singer Whitney Houston.

== Synopsis ==
Using Whitney Houston's death on February 11, 2012 as a starting point, the documentary investigates Houston's history and her emotional connections with her family and friends. The film uses archive footage from Houston's 1999 World Tour mixed with testimonies from Houston's family, friends and musicians who worked with her. The documentary gives special attention to her relationships with her mother, father, husband, and daughter and her onetime best friend Robyn Crawford. The film also addresses Houston's history of drug use, including allegations of an overdose in the 1990s. The film touches upon Houston's beginnings as a gospel singer, her discovery by Arista Records's head Clive Davis, and key moments such as the releases of her debut album in 1985 and the film The Bodyguard in 1992.

== Cast ==
- Whitney Houston as Herself (archive footage)
- Bobbi Kristina Brown as Herself (archive footage)
- Bobby Brown as Himself (archive footage)
- Robyn Crawford as Herself (archive footage)
- John Russell Houston Jr. as Himself (archive footage)
- Cissy Houston as Herself (archive footage)
- David Roberts as Himself
- Alan Jacobs as himself (archive footage)

== Reception ==
On review aggregator Rotten Tomatoes, the film has an approval rating of 87% based on 67 reviews, with an average rating of 6.8/10. The site's critical consensus reads, "Whitney: Can I Be Me offers a sobering inside look at the tragic downfall of a brilliant performer, even as it leaves the audience yearning for deeper insight." On Metacritic, the film has a score of 64 out of 100, based on 15 critics, indicating "generally favorable reviews".
