= Soul Divas Tour =

2004 concert tour

- Promotional tour by Dionne Warwick, Natalie Cole and Whitney Houston
- Promotional poster for the tour
- Location: Europe; Asia
- Start date: July 7, 2004
- End date: July 11, 2004
- Legs: 1
- No. of shows: 7
Dionne Warwick tour chronology
Dionne: 40th Anniversary Tour (2003)	Soul Divas Tour (2004)	An Evening with Dionne (2007)
Natalie Cole tour chronology
Ask a Woman Who Knows Tour (2003)	Soul Divas Tour (2004)	I'm Leavin' Tour (2006)
Whitney Houston tour chronology
My Love Is Your Love World Tour (1999)	Soul Divas Tour (2004)	Nothing but Love World Tour (2009–10)

The Soul Divas Tour was a co-headlining concert tour by American recording artists Dionne Warwick, Natalie Cole and Whitney Houston. The tour was a one-month trek that started on July 7, in Hamburg, Germany. The tour was created and initiated by Felix Scheuerpflug and the team of the Welldone Agency. The exclusive promoter was Tchibo. Tickets were available on Tchibo.de only. Houston, who was featured as the main headliner, also toured Thailand, Hong Kong, and China without Cole and Warwick, adding a few more dates through late July.

This marked the first time the three singers embarked on a tour together. Highlights of the tour, included duets with Warwick and Houston, also Cole and Houston duet on Cole's number-one R&B hit "This Will Be". After Whitney's set, all three ladies would appear together to sing Warwick's worldwide hit, "That's What Friends Are For". At the time of the tour, entertainment media mentioned that the tour would arrive in North America, but was soon postponed until further notice.

== Set list ==
Dionne Warwick

1. "They Long to Be Close to You"
2. "Walk On By"
3. "Anyone Who Had a Heart"
4. "This Girl's in Love with You"
5. "I Say a Little Prayer"
6. "What the World Needs Now Is Love"
7. "I'll Never Love This Way Again"
8. "Heartbreaker"

Natalie Cole

1. "Tell Me All About It"
2. "What a Diff'rence a Day Makes"
3. "The Very Thought of You"
4. "Unforgettable"
5. "Miss You Like Crazy"
6. "Mr. Melody"
7. "I've Got Love on My Mind"
8. "This Will Be"

Whitney Houston

1. "If I Told You That"
2. "Get It Back"
3. "You Light Up My Life"
4. "Saving All My Love for You" / "Greatest Love of All" / "All at Once" / "You Give Good Love"
5. "Superstar" / "Never Too Much" (Tribute to Luther Vandross)
6. "Step by Step"
7. "Wishin' and Hopin'" / "Alfie (performed with Dionne Warwick) (Note: performed only in Hamburg, and Oberhausen)
8. "Heartbreak Hotel" / "It's Not Right but It's Okay"
9. "My Love Is Your Love"
10. "I Go to the Rock"
11. "This Will Be" (performed with Natalie Cole)
12. "I Wanna Dance With Somebody (Who Loves Me)"
13. "How Will I Know"
14. "Didn't We Almost Have It All" (Note: performed only in Beijing, and Shanghai)
15. "I Will Always Love You"
16. "I'm Every Woman"
17. "That's What Friends Are For" (performed with Natalie Cole and Dionne Warwick)

Notes

=== Notes ===
- Houston's set included a tribute to close friend Luther Vandross, performing his classic tunes "Never Too Much" and "Superstar". Vandross at the time was in a rehabilitation center recovering from a stroke in 2003.
- July 7 and 11: Hamburg, and Oberhausen, Whitney and Dionne sang a duet of "Wishin' and Hopin'"; also for the closing finale, "That's What Friends Are For" was performed by Cole, Houston and Warwick.
- Additional dates was set in Asia. Due to scheduling conflicts, Houston performed the remaining dates without Dionne Warwick and Natalie Cole. Whitney performed shows in Thailand, China and Hong Kong.
- July 19: in Bangkok, Whitney performed "Amazing Grace" followed by "I Go to the Rock".
- July 22, 25 and 28: during the shows in Shanghai, Beijing and Hong Kong she performed "The Battle Hymn of the Republic".

== Shows ==
Date	City	Country	Venue
Europe
July 7, 2004	Hamburg	Germany	Color Line Arena
July 9, 2004	Munich	Germany	Olympiahalle
July 11, 2004	Oberhausen	Germany	König Pilsener Arena
Asia (Whitney Houston only)
July 19, 2004	Bangkok	Thailand	Impact Arena
July 22, 2004	Shanghai	China	HongKou Stadium
July 25, 2004	Beijing	China	Beijing National Stadium
July 28, 2004	Hong Kong	China	Hong Kong Convention and Exhibition Centre

Cancelled show

Date	City	Country	Venue
July 2, 2004	Berlin	Germany	Brandenburg Gate
