= List of European number-one hits of 1999 =

This is a list of the European Hot 100 Singles and European Top 100 Albums number ones of 1999, as published by Music & Media magazine.

== Chart history ==
Key
†	Indicates best-performing single and album of 1999

Issue date	Song	Artist	Album	Artist	Ref.
2 January (Note: The first three weeks of 1999 were combined into the issue dated 16 January.)	"Believe"	Cher	The Best of 1980–1990	U2	
9 January	"Believe"	Cher	Ladies & Gentlemen: The Best of George Michael	George Michael	
16 January	"Believe"	Cher	Ladies & Gentlemen: The Best of George Michael	George Michael	
23 January	"Believe"	Cher	Ladies & Gentlemen: The Best of George Michael	George Michael	
30 January	"Believe"	Cher	Ladies & Gentlemen: The Best of George Michael	George Michael	
6 February	"Believe"	Cher	Ladies & Gentlemen: The Best of George Michael	George Michael	
13 February	"Believe"	Cher	Believe †	Cher	
20 February	"Believe"	Cher	Believe †	Cher	
27 February	"Big Big World"	Emilia	Believe †	Cher	
6 March	"Big Big World"	Emilia	Believe †	Cher	
13 March	"...Baby One More Time"	Britney Spears	Believe †	Cher	
20 March	"...Baby One More Time"	Britney Spears	Believe †	Cher	
27 March	"...Baby One More Time"	Britney Spears	Believe †	Cher	
3 April	"...Baby One More Time"	Britney Spears	Believe †	Cher	
10 April	"...Baby One More Time"	Britney Spears	13	Blur	
17 April	"...Baby One More Time"	Britney Spears	Sogno	Andrea Bocelli	
24 April	"...Baby One More Time"	Britney Spears	Sogno	Andrea Bocelli	
1 May	"...Baby One More Time"	Britney Spears	Sogno	Andrea Bocelli	
8 May	"...Baby One More Time"	Britney Spears	Bury the Hatchet	The Cranberries	
15 May	"...Baby One More Time"	Britney Spears	Bury the Hatchet	The Cranberries	
22 May	"I Want It That Way"	Backstreet Boys	Bury the Hatchet	The Cranberries	
29 May	"I Want It That Way"	Backstreet Boys	Bury the Hatchet	The Cranberries	
5 June	"I Want It That Way"	Backstreet Boys	Millennium	Backstreet Boys	
12 June	"I Want It That Way"	Backstreet Boys	Millennium	Backstreet Boys	
19 June	"I Want It That Way"	Backstreet Boys	Millennium	Backstreet Boys	
26 June	"I Want It That Way"	Backstreet Boys	Millennium	Backstreet Boys	
3 July	"I Want It That Way"	Backstreet Boys	My Love Is Your Love	Whitney Houston	
10 July	"My Love Is Your Love"	Whitney Houston	My Love Is Your Love	Whitney Houston	
17 July	"Wild Wild West"	Will Smith featuring Dru Hill and Kool Moe Dee	My Love Is Your Love	Whitney Houston	
24 July	"Wild Wild West"	Will Smith featuring Dru Hill and Kool Moe Dee	My Love Is Your Love	Whitney Houston	
31 July	"Wild Wild West"	Will Smith featuring Dru Hill and Kool Moe Dee	Californication	Red Hot Chili Peppers	
7 August	"Mambo No. 5 (A Little Bit of...)"	Lou Bega	Ricky Martin	Ricky Martin	
14 August	"Mambo No. 5 (A Little Bit of...)"	Lou Bega	Ricky Martin	Ricky Martin	
21 August	"Mambo No. 5 (A Little Bit of...)"	Lou Bega	My Love Is Your Love	Whitney Houston	
28 August	"Blue (Da Ba Dee)" †	Eiffel 65	My Love Is Your Love	Whitney Houston	
4 September	"Blue (Da Ba Dee)" †	Eiffel 65	My Love Is Your Love	Whitney Houston	
11 September	"Mambo No. 5 (A Little Bit of...)"	Lou Bega	My Love Is Your Love	Whitney Houston	
18 September	"Mambo No. 5 (A Little Bit of...)"	Lou Bega	My Love Is Your Love	Whitney Houston	
25 September	"Mambo No. 5 (A Little Bit of...)"	Lou Bega	My Love Is Your Love	Whitney Houston	
2 October	"Blue (Da Ba Dee)" †	Eiffel 65	Come On Over	Shania Twain	
9 October	"Blue (Da Ba Dee)" †	Eiffel 65	Come On Over	Shania Twain	
16 October	"Blue (Da Ba Dee)" †	Eiffel 65	Brand New Day	Sting	
23 October	"Blue (Da Ba Dee)" †	Eiffel 65	Brand New Day	Sting	
30 October	"Genie in a Bottle"	Christina Aguilera	Brand New Day	Sting	
6 November	"Genie in a Bottle"	Christina Aguilera	Peace	Eurythmics	
13 November	"Genie in a Bottle"	Christina Aguilera	Clapton Chronicles: The Best of Eric Clapton	Eric Clapton	
20 November	"Blue (Da Ba Dee)" †	Eiffel 65	Rainbow	Mariah Carey	
27 November	"Genie in a Bottle"	Christina Aguilera	The Greatest Hits	Cher	
4 December	"If I Could Turn Back the Hands of Time"	R. Kelly	All the Way... A Decade of Song	Celine Dion	
11 December	"If I Could Turn Back the Hands of Time"	R. Kelly	All the Way... A Decade of Song	Celine Dion	
18 December	"If I Could Turn Back the Hands of Time"	R. Kelly	All the Way... A Decade of Song	Celine Dion	
25 December	"If I Could Turn Back the Hands of Time"	R. Kelly	All the Way... A Decade of Song	Celine Dion	

== See also ==
- 1999 in music
- List of number-one hits in Europe
