= My Love Is Your Love (song) =

1999 single by Whitney Houston

Single by Whitney Houston

from the album My Love Is Your Love
- Released: May 31, 1999
- Studio: The Hit Factory
- Genre: R&B; reggae fusion
- Length: 4:20 (album version); 4:05 (single version)
- Label: Arista
- Songwriters: Wyclef Jean; Jerry Duplessis
- Producers: Wyclef Jean; Jerry Duplessis

Whitney Houston singles chronology
"It's Not Right but It's Okay" (1999)	"My Love Is Your Love" (1999)	"I Learned from the Best" (1999)

Audio sample
- "My Love Is Your Love": file; help

Music video
- "My Love Is Your Love" on YouTube

"My Love Is Your Love" is a song by American singer Whitney Houston. It was written and produced by Wyclef Jean and Jerry Duplessis for Houston's fourth studio album of the same name (1998). Musically, the song combines reggae, R&B, gospel, soul and funk elements. Jean and Duplessis developed its beat while traveling on Jean's tour bus, while the repeated "clap your hands" refrain interpolates the Meters' 1970 recording "Handclapping Song". The song is about an unconditional love that lasts so strong that it overcomes world tragedies.

Released on May 31, 1999, as the album's fourth single, it received positive reviews and sold 10 million units worldwide, hitting the top 10 in 23 international markets. The song peaked at number four on the US Billboard Hot 100, number two in the United Kingdom, and number one in New Zealand and on the Eurochart Hot 100. Along with the original mid-tempo reggae-influenced version that was produced by Wyclef Jean, a remixed dance version by Jonathan Peters was also released, and helped Houston earn a number one hit on the US Billboard Dance Club Play chart. It was later certified double platinum by the Recording Industry Association of America (RIAA) and platinum by the British Phonographic Industry (BPI) and was also certified in nine other countries.

A live version was included in the 2014 CD/DVD release, Whitney Houston Live: Her Greatest Performances. Duke Dumont interpolated the song in his hit song "I Got U". The song has been placed in three Houston compilation albums (Whitney: The Greatest Hits, The Ultimate Collection and I Will Always Love You: The Best of Whitney Houston) and is considered one of her signature songs.

== Background ==
Throughout the 1990s, Whitney Houston had enjoyed huge success in both music and movies but hadn't released a full-length studio album in nearly eight years since I'm Your Baby Tonight (1990). Following the end of a brief ten-date European tour, Houston began recording a batch of new songs aimed at R&B and hip-hop audiences.

Arista Records CEO Clive Davis had first contacted Wyclef Jean to work on a song for Houston while the producer and artist was on tour to promote his hit album, Wyclef Jean Presents The Carnival. At the time Jean was reached to give Houston a song, he had just produced a hit remix on Destiny's Child's 1998 hit, "No, No, No" and at the same time was working on the song "Maria Maria" with the rock band Santana, who had recently signed to Arista.

== Recording and composition ==
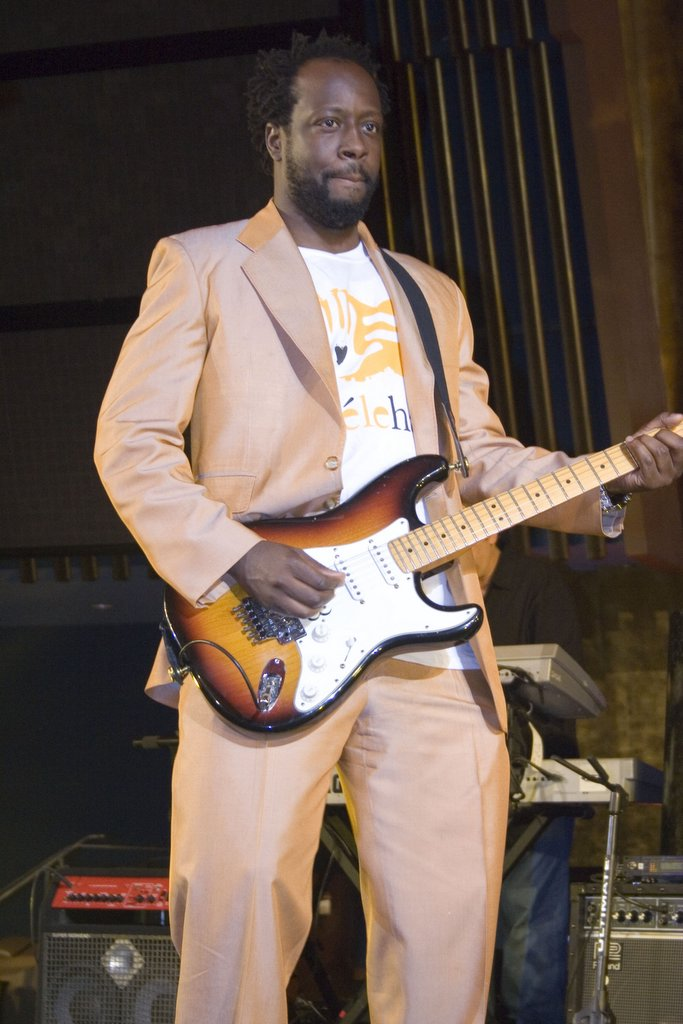
Wyclef Jean (pictured in 2006) co-wrote and co-produced "My Love Is Your Love" for Houston.

"My Love Is Your Love" was written and produced by Wyclef Jean and his cousin Jerry "Wonder" Duplessis. According to Duplessis, the pair developed the song's beat while traveling on Jean's tour bus, which was equipped with a recording studio. Jean later recalled that he had Houston and her family, particularly her daughter Bobbi Kristina Brown, in mind while composing the song. Jean recorded a demo of the song himself and sent it to Davis, who subsequently presented it to Houston, who agreed to record it.

Recording took place at The Hit Factory in Manhattan. Jean had not met Houston before the recording session and was initially uncertain about how she would respond to the song, wondering whether she would connect with the material. He subsequently described Houston as having "lit up the room" upon entering the studio, recalling her humor and outgoing personality. Jean said that the relaxed atmosphere of the session made it difficult for him to determine when they had completed the recording.

During the session, Jean stopped the recording after believing that Houston had sung a note either flat or sharp. Houston explained that she had intentionally bent the note rather than sung it out of tune. Jean later cited the incident as an example of her vocal control, explaining that she could move a note outside its conventional pitch and return it to pitch. Houston later referred to the recording as her "island song."

Houston's five-year-old daughter, Bobbi Kristina, was present during the recording session. Jean and Duplessis were reportedly inspired by the interaction between Houston and her daughter and decided to include Bobbi Kristina's voice in the recording. Houston approved the idea, and Bobbi Kristina can be heard encouraging her mother during the song. Additional background vocals were provided by Houston's husband Bobby Brown as well as future City High members Robbie Pardlo and Ryan Toby, while Houston performed the lead and background vocals. The recording also features the Family Friends Community Choir.

"My Love Is Your Love" is a R&B and reggae fusion song with funk, soul and gospel elements that walks at a tempo of 84 beats per minute and is set in the time signature of 4/4 common time, according to its sheet notes published by Sony/ATV Tunes on Musicnotes.com.

The song starts and mostly plays in the key of C major. The song interpolates the hook from the Meters' funk song "Handclapping Song" (1970), with a background singer repeating the line, "clap your hands y'all / it's alright".

== Critical reception ==
Daily Record wrote, "A fantastic return to form and another great single from her latest album of the same name. This once again uses a hip-hop beat to perfectly capture Whitney's soaring vocals." They also stated that "this is the best track in years from the soul diva." Entertainment Weekly editor Mark Bautz praised the song, "Wyclef Jean's gorgeous reggae-tinged title song and three funky cuts by Rodney Jerkins showcase the 35-year-old Whitney Houston in all her creative, soulful maturity." Rolling Stone's Rob Sheffield praised the song as a one with some "creative juice"; "on the excellent title track, Wyclef gives Houston the sexiest Bob Marley rip-off he's ever written." USA Today editor Rachel D. called this track "a spiritual, reggae-tinged jam from Wyclef Jean." Andy Gill of The Independent criticized "My Love Is Your Love," describing it as an "anthemic number" whose recycled melodies made its construction overly obvious.

== Chart performance ==
=== Europe ===
"My Love Is Your Love" was released throughout Europe in mid-1999, prior to the United States. Upon release, the song was popular immediately across Europe and became a bigger hit during her European leg of My Love Is Your Love World Tour.

On June 27, 1999, the single went straight to its peak position, number two, in the United Kingdom for the week ending date of July 3, 1999. According to The Official Charts Company, it has sold 525,000 copies there, becoming Britain's 22nd best-selling single of 1999.

In Germany, it was also very successful. The single entered Media Control Top 100 Singles Chart at number 39, the week dated June 14, 1999, and three weeks later reached a peak of two, spending fifteen consecutive weeks within the top 10 on the chart. It was certified Platinum by the Bundesverband Musikindustrie (BVMI) for shipments of 500,000 copies of the single.

The song also reached the number two position in countries such as Austria, Ireland, the Netherlands, Sweden, and Switzerland. It went to top five in Belgium (Flanders), Denmark, and Norway, and reached the top 10 on the singles charts in Belgium (Wallonia), Canada, Poland, and France.

Eventually, the single topped the European Hot 100 Singles Chart for a week, replacing the Backstreet Boys' "I Want It That Way" from the top spot, becoming her fourth number one single on the chart and was positioned at number six on Europe's Top Singles list of 1999. By September 1999, it was reported that the song had sold over 1.4 million copies worldwide and that at that time, all but 50,000 of those copies were from Europe.

=== Oceania ===
In Australia, the song reached a peak of number 27. In New Zealand, it peaked at number one for a week, making it Houston's third number-one single in the country after 1987's "I Wanna Dance with Somebody (Who Loves Me)" and 1992's "I Will Always Love You."

=== North America ===
Likewise, "My Love Is Your Love" was a big hit in the United States. The song debuted at number 81 on the Billboard Hot 100 chart, the issue dated September 4, 1999, without a retail release.

With its official single in two weeks, it shot up on the chart and reached the top 10 in the next three weeks, the issue date of October 9, 1999, becoming her 22nd Hot 100 top-10 hit.

On January 1, 2000, the single peaked at number four, making her the first artist to have a top-10 hit in the 1980s, 1990s and 2000s, staying within the top 10 of the chart for 17 weeks. It also reached the number two position on the Billboard Hot R&B/Hip-Hop Songs chart (formerly "Hot R&B Singles & Tracks"), the issue date of September 25, 1999, spending a total of 29 weeks on the chart, and topped Billboard Hot Dance Music/Club Play, making it Houston's eighth number-one song of the chart. The song also reached top 10 on the Billboard Pop Songs, becoming her final single on the chart.

According to Nielsen SoundScan in 1999, it had sold 900,000 copies in the US. The single was certified platinum by the Recording Industry Association of America for shipments of a million copies on December 14, 1999. In June 2025, the song was certified double platinum for equivalent sales of two million copies alone. In Canada, the song peaked at number 10, giving Houston her career 20th top ten entry in the country.

== Music video ==
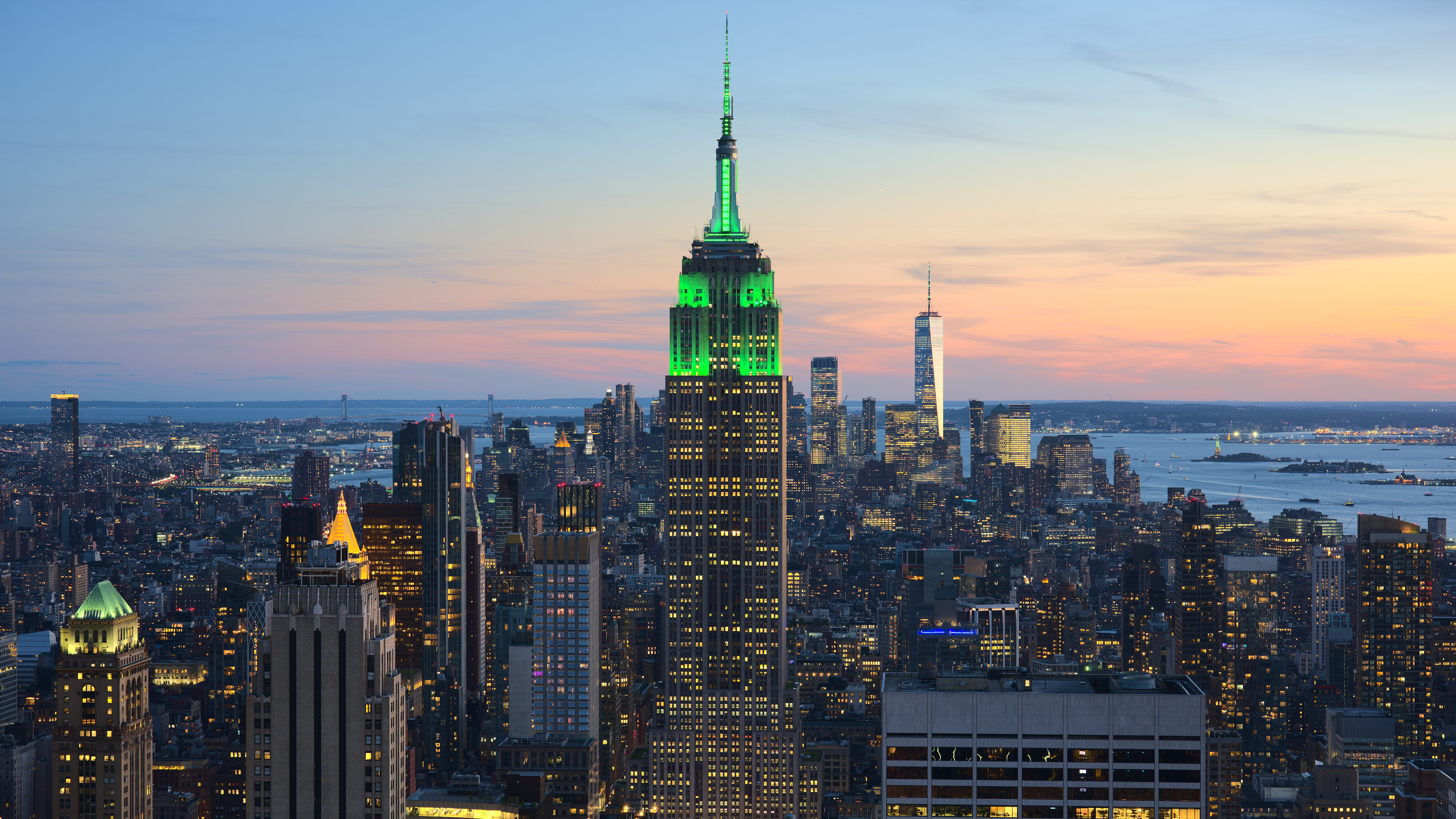
The music video for "My Love Is Your Love" was filmed in various locations throughout Manhattan.

The music video for "My Love Is Your Love" was directed by Kevin Bray and filmed in Manhattan boroughs of New York City in early spring 1999, marking Houston’s third consecutive video directed by Bray following "Heartbreak Hotel" and "It's Not Right but It's Okay." The video marked a stylistic departure from Houston’s earlier work, incorporating a more urban, hip-hop-influenced aesthetic and a casual visual style. According to Duplessis, Houston insisted that he and Jean appear in the video despite initial reservations from Arista Records executives, eventually securing their participation.

The video opens with a ticket attendant at a movie theater looking at the night sky before a citywide blackout plunges the surrounding neighborhood into darkness. Houston, wearing a long brown leather trench coat and an Afro hairstyle, walks through the streets, observing the mixture of disorder and quiet brought by the blackout. She later removes the coat to reveal a denim jacket, beige blouse, and dark denim jeans, with her casual appearance drawing inspiration from singer Lauryn Hill. The visuals later depict a neighborhood party, where Houston performs the song onstage before an audience, with Jean and Duplessis appearing as DJs. It concludes with the crowd applauding and celebrating alongside Houston, Jean, and Duplessis.

The video became a hit upon its premiere on the video channels MTV, BET and VH1 and, like many of Houston's music videos for the My Love Is Your Love album, spun on heavy rotation. Since being uploaded on Houston's official channel on YouTube, the video has been viewed over 124 million times on the channel.

== Live performances ==
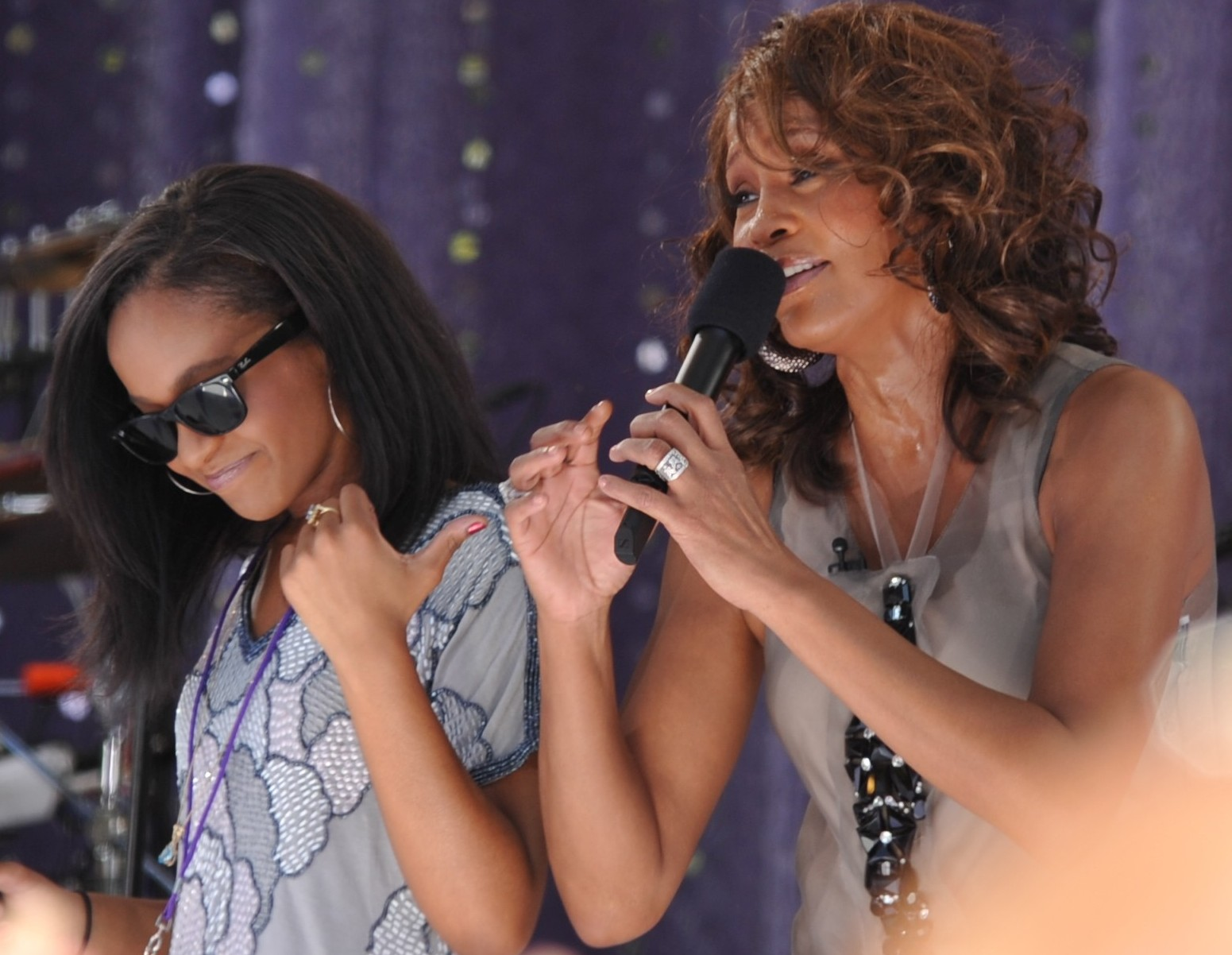
Houston performing My Love Is Your Love with Bobbi Kristina Brown on Good Morning America in 2009.

Houston gave several live performances of the song over the years. During promotion of the album, the singer constantly performed it. In November 1998, she premiered the song while appearing on Late Show with David Letterman in her first Letterman appearance since 1985. Wyclef Jean joined her onstage during the performance. Houston also performed the song while appearing on the Rosie O'Donnell Show in December of the same year as well as Today that same month.

Houston also performed the song at the 26th American Music Awards at Los Angeles' Shrine Auditorium in January 1999 with Jean and Babyface on piano. In April of that year, she performed the song at Divas Live '99 with her daughter Bobbi Kristina Brown singing alongside her while sitting in a chair and was later accompanied by rap artist Treach of the American hip-hop group Naughty by Nature. Houston also performed the song, along with "It's Not Right but It's Okay" and "I Learned From the Best", on the British music show, Top of the Pops. She also performed the song on the Oprah Winfrey Show in June 1999, just as the singer was about to launch a world tour.

In November 1999, the song was performed alongside the album track "Get It Back" at the 1999 MTV Europe Music Awards. During her performance at Arista's 25th anniversary concert special in May 2000, she performed the song as the closer to her show-stealing five-song set. Nine years later, she performed the song alongside her now-teenage daughter for Good Morning America.

Houston performed the song on two of her final world tours and the co-headlining territorial Soul Divas Tour in 2004. During some concert dates for the My Love Is Your Love World Tour (1999), Houston would be joined onstage by husband Bobby Brown, who would perform JT Money's "Who Dat". On other occasions Houston would bring her daughter onstage. For the Nothing but Love World Tour (2009–2010), Houston performed it solo.

== Legacy ==
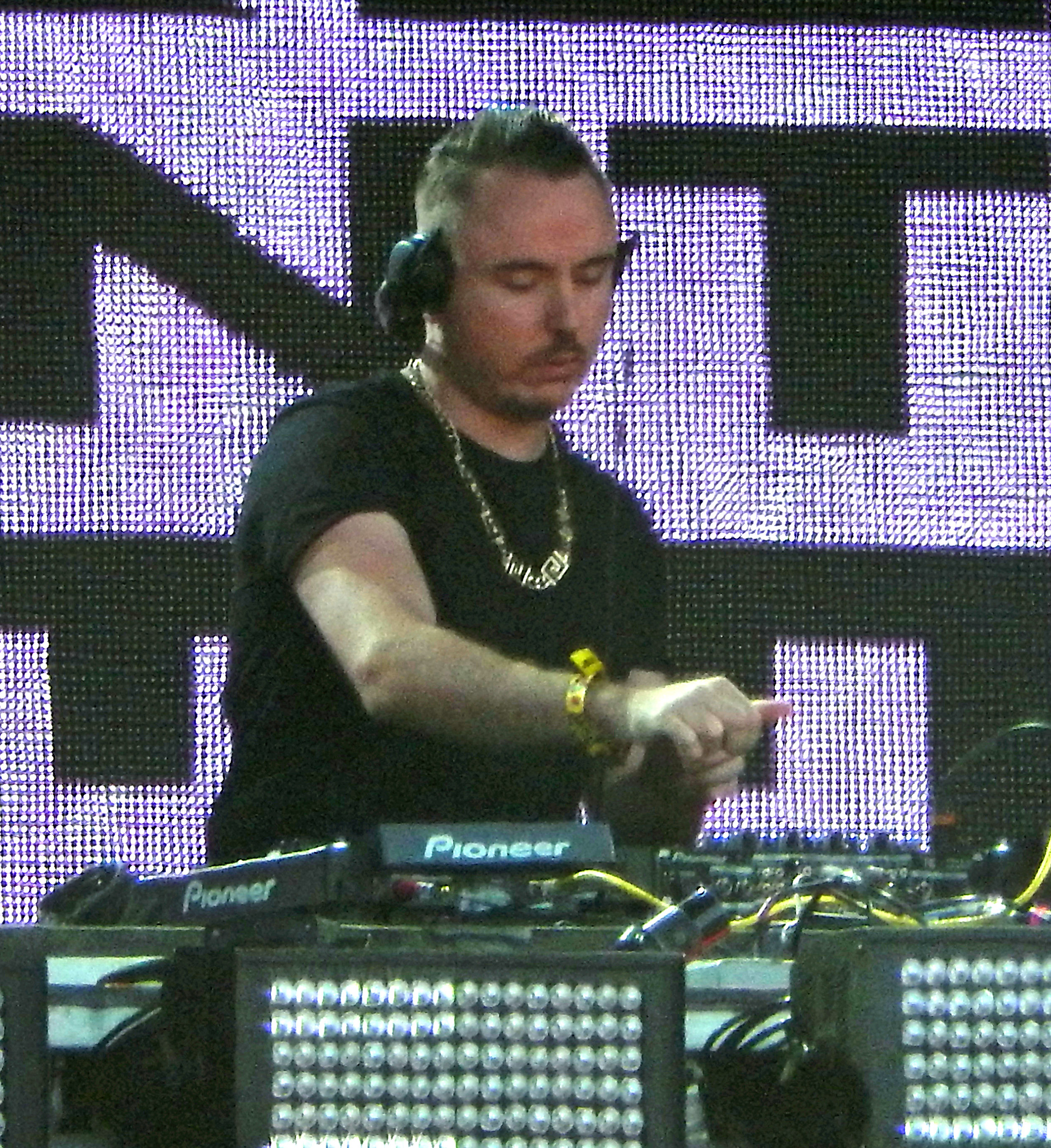
Duke Dumont interpolated parts of "My Love Is Your Love" for his 2014 hit "I Got U" with Jax Jones.

"My Love Is Your Love" has been cited as one of Houston's signature songs. The song was voted the 15th "Best '90s Love Song" by Cosmopolitan, becoming one of two Houston entries on the list, with her 1992 hit, "I Will Always Love You", topping the list. Slant voted the song the 15th best of Houston's songs, writing that the song was her "most soulful single. Further disproving the suspicion that she was incapable of conveying emotion in any form other than shouting, Whitney’s restrained vocal performance here rides a smooth, shuffling groove into eternity."

On their list of "The 40 Best Whitney Houston Songs", BET voted the song the twelfth best. Entertainment Weekly ranked the song the fourth best Houston song out of 25 entries, writing that the song "redefined her for a younger generation". Forbes ranked it the 17th best out of 20 Houston songs, writing that "even though the song’s reggae-inspired beat was a departure from Houston’s usual sound, it worked beautifully". About.com voted the song the 13th best Houston song out of 20. The Guardian ranked the song the 40th greatest No. 2 song on their list of 70 songs that peaked at number two on the UK singles chart, comparing the song to Bob Marley's "No Woman, No Cry", writing "'My Love Is Your Love' remains a fantastic song, projecting a warmth and intimacy so infectious that Houston dialled down the vocal fireworks to sing it."

The song has been sampled many times, according to WhoSampled with artists such as Duke Dumont and Jax Jones sampling it for the song "I Got U". The song would become a hit, later topping the official UK singles chart. Other prominent artists who sampled the song include George the Poet, HBz and Bugzy Malone.

In addition, the song—like many of Houston's songs—has been covered by numerous artists, including Trisha Yearwood, Sam Smith, Durand Bernarr, Glennis Grace and the entire cast of Glee, who covered it for the Houston tribute episode, "Dance with Somebody". In 2025, the song started being used in commercial ads for jewelry brand Pandora's "Be Love" campaign featuring Iman and Winona Ryder.

== Track listings ==
- US 2× 12-inch vinyl single
  - A1. "My Love Is Your Love" (Jonathan Peters' Vocal Mix) – 13:46
  - B1. "My Love Is Your Love" (Thunderpuss 2000 Severe Dub) – 8:31
  - B2. "My Love Is Your Love" (Album Version) – 4:24
  - C1. "My Love Is Your Love" (Thunderpuss 2000 Club Mix) – 8:28
  - C2. "My Love Is Your Love" (Album Version) (Instrumental) – 4:24
  - D1. "My Love Is Your Love" (Wyclef Remix) – 4:10
  - D2. "My Love Is Your Love" (Salaam Remix) – 4:11
- US maxi-CD single
  1. "My Love Is Your Love" (Wyclef Remix) – 4:10
  2. "My Love Is Your Love" (Salaam Remix) – 4:11
  3. "My Love Is Your Love" (Jonathan Peters' Radio Mix) – 4:30
  4. "My Love Is Your Love" (Thunderpuss 2000 Radio Mix) – 4:11
  5. "My Love Is Your Love" (Jonathan Peters' Vocal Club Mix) – 13:46
  6. "My Love Is Your Love" (Thunderpuss 2000 Club Mix) – 8:28
  7. "My Love Is Your Love" (Thunderpuss 2000 Severe Dub) – 8:31
  8. "It's Not Right But It's Okay" (KCC's Release The Love Groove Mix) – 7:05
- Australian maxi-CD single
  1. "My Love Is Your Love" (Album Version) – 4:22
  2. "My Love Is Your Love" (Wyclef Remix) – 4:19
  3. "It's Not Right But It's Okay" (KCC's Release The Love Groove Bootleg Mix) – 7:03
  4. "My Love Is Your Love" (Thunderpuss 2000 Club Mix) – 8:30
  5. "My Love Is Your Love" (Jonathan Peters' Vocal Club Mix) – 13:48
- European maxi-CD single
  1. "My Love Is Your Love" (Radio Edit) – 4:03
  2. "My Love Is Your Love" (Wyclef Mix) – 4:23
  3. "My Love Is Your Love" (Salaam Remi Remix) – 4:12
  4. "It's Not Right But It's Okay" (KCC's Release The Love Groove Bootleg Mix) – 7:04
- European maxi-CD single (The Remixes)
  1. "My Love Is Your Love" (Radio Edit) – 4:04
  2. "My Love Is Your Love" (Wyclef Mix Feat. Dyme) – 4:22
  3. "My Love Is Your Love" (Jonathan Peters Tight Mix) – 8:23
  4. "My Love Is Your Love" (Thunderpuss Radio Mix) – 4:11
  5. "My Love Is Your Love" (Marvel & Eily South Side Mix) – 7:14
- European CD single
  1. "My Love Is Your Love" (Radio Edit) – 4:03
  2. "My Love Is Your Love" (Wyclef Mix) – 4:23
- UK CD single
  1. "My Love Is Your Love" (Radio Edit) – 4:03
  2. "My Love Is Your Love" (Wyclef Mix) – 4:23
  3. "My Love Is Your Love" (Marvel & Eily Vocal Mix) – 7:14

== Personnel ==
Credits

- Written and produced by W. Jean, J. Duplessis
- Lead and background vocals: Whitney Houston
- Choir: Eric Cherry's Family And Friends
- Additional vocals: Robby Pardlo, Ryan Toby

Recording and mixing

- Recorded and mixed by Rickie St. Hilaire at The Hit Factory

== Charts ==
=== Weekly charts ===
Chart (1999–2000)	Peak position
Australia (ARIA)	27
Austria (Ö3 Austria Top 40)	2
Belgium (Ultratop 50 Flanders)	3
Belgium (Ultratop 50 Wallonia)	9
Canada (Nielsen SoundScan)	10
Canada Top Singles (RPM)	10
Canada Dance/Urban (RPM)	5
Czech Republic (IFPI)	25
Denmark (Tracklisten)	5
Estonia (Eesti Top 20)	2
Europe (European Hot 100)	1
Finland (Suomen virallinen lista)	12
France (SNEP)	10
Germany (GfK)	2
Hungary (Mahasz)	7
Iceland (Íslenski Listinn Topp 40)	4
Ireland (IRMA)	2
Latvia (Latvijas Top 197)	3
Netherlands (Dutch Top 40)	3
Netherlands (Single Top 100)	2
New Zealand (Recorded Music NZ)	1
Norway (VG-lista)	4
Poland Airplay (Music & Media)	6
Quebec (ADISQ)	38
Scottish Singles Sales (Official Charts)	3
Spain (Promusicae)	13
Sweden (Sverigetopplistan)	2
Switzerland (Schweizer Hitparade)	2
UK Singles (Official Charts)	2
UK Hip Hop/R&B (Official Charts)	1
UK Airplay (Music Week)	3
US Billboard Hot 100	4
US Dance Club Songs (Billboard)	1
US Dance Singles Sales (Billboard)	1
US Hot R&B/Hip-Hop Songs (Billboard)	2
US Pop Airplay (Billboard)	10
US Rhythmic Airplay (Billboard)	21

Chart (2012)	Peak position
Netherlands (Single Top 100)	80
France (SNEP)	52
Spain (Promusicae)	33
Switzerland (Schweizer Hitparade)	66
UK Singles (Official Charts)	42
US R&B/Hip-Hop Digital Songs (Billboard)	29

=== Year-end charts ===
Chart (1999)	Position
Austria (Ö3 Austria Top 40)	6
Belgium (Ultratop 50 Flanders)	13
Belgium (Ultratop 50 Wallonia)	46
Europe (European Hot 100)	7
France (SNEP)	33
Germany (Media Control)	5
Germany R&B Singles (Media Control)	1
Netherlands (Dutch Top 40)	8
Netherlands (Single Top 100)	15
New Zealand (RIANZ)	18
Sweden (Hitlistan)	17
Switzerland (Schweizer Hitparade)	5
UK Singles (OCC)	19
UK Airplay (Music Week)	11
UK Urban (Music Week)	16
US Billboard Hot 100	73
US Dance Club Play (Billboard)	3
US Hot R&B/Hip-Hop Singles & Tracks (Billboard)	33
US Maxi-Singles Sales (Billboard)	15
US Rhythmic Top 40 (Billboard)	93

Chart (2000)	Position
US Billboard Hot 100	47
US Mainstream Top 40 (Billboard)	47
US Rhythmic Top 40 (Billboard)	73

=== Decade-end charts ===
Chart (1990–1999)	Position
Austria (Ö3 Austria Top 40)	33
Netherlands (Dutch Top 40)	77

== Certifications ==
Region	Certification	Certified units/sales
Austria (IFPI Austria)	Platinum	50,000^{*}
Belgium (BRMA)	Gold	25,000^{*}
Denmark (IFPI Danmark)	Gold	45,000^{‡}
France (SNEP)	Silver	125,000^{*}
Germany (BVMI)	Platinum	500,000^{^}
Netherlands (NVPI)	Gold	50,000^{^}
New Zealand (RMNZ)	Platinum	30,000^{‡}
Sweden (GLF)	Platinum	30,000^{^}
Switzerland (IFPI Switzerland)	2× Platinum	100,000^{^}
United Kingdom (BPI)	Platinum	600,000^{‡}
United States (RIAA)	2× Platinum	2,000,000^{‡}
^{*} Sales figures based on certification alone.^{^} Shipments figures based on certification alone.^{‡} Sales+streaming figures based on certification alone.

== Release history ==
Region	Date	Format(s)	Label(s)	Ref(s).
Sweden	May 31, 1999	CD	Arista; BMG	
United Kingdom	June 21, 1999	CD; cassette	Arista; BMG	
United States	July 6, 1999	Urban; urban adult contemporary radio	Arista	
United States	July 20, 1999	Rhythmic contemporary radio	Arista	
United States	August 31, 1999	12-inch vinyl; maxi-CD	Arista	
United States	September 7, 1999	CD; cassette	Arista	
Japan	October 21, 1999	CD	Arista	

== See also ==
- List of European number-one hits of 1999
- List of number-one singles in 1999 (New Zealand)
- List of number-one dance singles of 1999 (U.S.)
- List of Billboard Hot 100 top 10 singles in 1999
- List of Billboard Hot 100 top 10 singles in 2000
- Billboard Year-End Hot 100 singles of 1999
- Billboard Year-End Hot 100 singles of 2000
