= My Love Is Your Love World Tour =

1999 concert tour by Whitney Houston

- Tour by Whitney Houston
- Location: 20 North America; 46 Europe
- Associated album: My Love Is Your Love
- Start date: June 22, 1999
- End date: November 8, 1999
- Legs: 2
- No. of shows: 66
- Box office: $26 million ($11.33 in 2024 dollars) (North America only)

Whitney Houston concert chronology
- The European Tour (1998); My Love Is Your Love World Tour (1999); Soul Divas Tour (2004)

The My Love Is Your Love World Tour (advertised as the World Tour 1999) was the eighth concert tour by American singer Whitney Houston. The tour was in support of her fourth album, My Love Is Your Love (1998). Beginning in the summer of 1999, the tour played over 60 shows in Europe and North America. The tour marked Houston's final concert appearances in North America.

== Background ==
After My Love is Your Love—Houston's first studio album in eight years—was released, the singer embarked on her first world tour since 1994 to promote it. For the North American leg of the tour, Houston turned down most arena dates in favor of theaters because she wanted "to do something where people can feel [her] and [she] can feel them." Performing in theaters allowed Houston's shows to have a jam-session atmosphere. Since theaters have lower capacities than arenas, Houston played in most North American cities for two nights each.

Houston signed a deal with Dolce & Gabbana to design all of her clothes for the tour. This deal gave Houston a more hip and contemporary look to match her music; this look contrasted with her previous tours. Houston first showcased her new wardrobe on The Oprah Winfrey Show prior to the tour opener in Chicago.

In July, Houston made a surprise appearance at the 13th Annual New York City Lesbian and Gay Pride Dance. At the event, the singer gave a rare performance of the popular remixes to "It's Not Right But It's OK" and "Heartbreak Hotel".

Controversy arose during the North American leg of the tour. There were reports of strange and erratic behavior behind the scenes. Houston cancelled some concert dates, including two shows in her hometown of Newark, New Jersey. The singer pulled out of her San Francisco show at the Concord Pavilion 15 minutes before it was scheduled to begin; the city demanded $100,000 in compensation after public outcry. Houston blamed all the cancellations on an ongoing throat ailment. Still, these actions would further spark tabloid rumors of drug use.

The tour was successful. The concerts featured Houston's highest ticket prices. With many shows, Houston commanded up to $150 for a ticket, making her just one of a few artists to break the $100-per-ticket barrier.

The tour was an even bigger success in Europe. It was the highest grossing European arena concert tour of the year, playing to almost half a million people. Every date was sold out in advance. As a result, the tour was extended to November due to high demand.

During the European leg of the tour, DoRo Productions filmed and produced a documentary of the tour: Whitney – Close Up. The documentary showcased behind-the-scenes footage, rehearsals and live performances throughout Europe. Close Up was originally set to be aired as a TV special in early 2000 following the release of Whitney: The Greatest Hits, but did not air at the time. Some footage from Close Up was also used in the documentary Whitney: Can I Be Me.

A similar but different documentary, also titled Close Up was broadcast on February 11, 2018, on the German TV channel ServusTV.

== Opening acts ==
- 112 (North America)
- Amanda Marshall (Europe)

== Set list ==
North America
1. "Get It Back"
2. "Heartbreak Hotel" (contains elements of "This Place Hotel")
3. "If I Told You That"
4. "You Give Good Love" / "Saving All My Love for You" / "Until You Come Back"
5. "Oh Yes"
6. "Exhale (Shoop Shoop)"
7. "I Learned from the Best"
8. "Higher Ground" (performed by Gary Houston)
9. "I'm Every Woman"
10. "I Wanna Dance with Somebody (Who Loves Me)"
11. "How Will I Know"
12. "In My Business"
13. "I Love the Lord"
14. "I Go to the Rock"
15. "My Love Is Your Love" (contains elements of "My Love Is Your Love (Salaam Remix)")
16. "I Believe in You and Me" / "Why Does It Hurt So Bad" / "It Hurts Like Hell" (contains elements of "The Glory of Love")
17. "I Will Always Love You"
18. "It's Not Right but It's Okay"
Europe
1. "Get It Back"
2. "Heartbreak Hotel" (contains elements of "This Place Hotel")
3. "If I Told You That"
4. "Saving All My Love for You" / "Until You Come Back"
5. "I Learned from the Best"
6. "Step by Step"
7. "Change the World" (performed by Gary Houston)
8. Medley Reprise: "I Have Nothing" / "I'm Your Baby Tonight" / "Run to You" / "Queen of the Night" (performed by backing vocalists)
9. "My Love Is Your Love" (contains elements of "My Love Is Your Love (Salaam Remix)")
10. "I'm Every Woman"
11. "I Wanna Dance with Somebody (Who Loves Me)"
12. "How Will I Know"
13. "Jesus Loves Me"
14. "I Love the Lord"
15. "I Go to the Rock"
16. "A House Is Not a Home"
17. "I Believe in You and Me" / "Why Does It Hurt So Bad" / "It Hurts Like Hell" (contains elements of "The Glory of Love")
18. "I Will Always Love You"
19. "It's Not Right But It's Okay" (contains elements of "It's Not Right but It's Okay (Thunderpuss Remix)")

Notes

- "My Love Is Your Love" and "Step by Step" were performed as encores in Chicago, replacing "It's Not Right But It's Okay" performed earlier in the show.
- "Abraham, Martin and John" was performed in Denver on July 26, and Los Angeles on July 30, as a tribute to the late John F. Kennedy Jr.
- September 18: Houston performed "You'll Never Stand Alone" in London, and "All at Once", on October 12, in Rotterdam.
- "Jesus Loves Me" and "Amazing Grace" was performed at select dates in Europe.
- October 18: "(You Make Me Feel Like A) Natural Woman" by Aretha Franklin was performed in Frankfurt, and a medley of Dionne Warwick's "Walk On By" and "Alfie" was performed in Oberhausen on October 30.
- November 2: in Antwerp, Houston performed "Greatest Love of All", and on November 8, in London a performance of "Home".
- September 24: in Cologne, Houston performed a snippet of “You Were Loved” from her soundtrack album The Preacher's Wife

== Shows ==
List of concerts, showing date, city, country, venue, tickets sold, number of available tickets and amount of gross revenue
| Date | City | Country | Venue | Attendance | Revenue |
North America
| June 22, 1999 | Chicago | United States | Arie Crown Theater | —N/a | —N/a |
| June 23, 1999 | Chicago | United States | Arie Crown Theater | —N/a | —N/a |
| June 25, 1999 | Detroit | United States | Fox Theatre | 9,575 / 9,575 | $752,653 |
| June 26, 1999 | Detroit | United States | Fox Theatre | 9,575 / 9,575 | $752,653 |
| June 29, 1999 | Toronto | Canada | Molson Amphitheatre | —N/a | —N/a |
| June 30, 1999 | Cuyahoga Falls | United States | Blossom Music Center | —N/a | —N/a |
| July 2, 1999 | Saratoga Springs | United States | Saratoga Performing Arts Center | —N/a | —N/a |
| July 5, 1999 | Washington, D.C. | United States | DAR Constitution Hall | —N/a | —N/a |
| July 8, 1999 | Boston | United States | Wang Theatre | 7,302 / 7,370 | $553,043 |
| July 9, 1999 | Boston | United States | Wang Theatre | 7,302 / 7,370 | $553,043 |
| July 11, 1999 | Wallingford | United States | SNET Oakdale Theatre | —N/a | —N/a |
| July 14, 1999 | New York City | United States | The Theater at Madison Square Garden | 10,714 / 10,866 | $802,323 |
| July 15, 1999 | New York City | United States | The Theater at Madison Square Garden | 10,714 / 10,866 | $802,323 |
| July 17, 1999 | Philadelphia | United States | Mann Music Center | —N/a | —N/a |
| July 18, 1999 | University Park | United States | Bryce Jordan Center | 5,831 / 10,400 | $260,305 |
| July 20, 1999 | Atlanta | United States | Fox Theatre | —N/a | —N/a |
| July 21, 1999 | Atlanta | United States | Fox Theatre | —N/a | —N/a |
| July 26, 1999 | Greenwood Village | United States | Fiddler's Green Amphitheatre | —N/a | —N/a |
| July 29, 1999 | Los Angeles | United States | Universal Amphitheatre | 12,294 / 12,378 | $873,140 |
| July 30, 1999 | Los Angeles | United States | Universal Amphitheatre | 12,294 / 12,378 | $873,140 |
Europe
| August 22, 1999^{[A]} | Sopot | Poland | Opera Leśna | —N/a | —N/a |
| August 25, 1999^{[B]} | Vechta | Germany | Westerheide | —N/a | —N/a |
| August 27, 1999^{[C]} | Coburg | Germany | Coburger Schloßplatz | —N/a | —N/a |
| August 28, 1999 | Mannheim | Germany | Mannheimer Schloss Ehrenhof | —N/a | —N/a |
| August 30, 1999 | Vienna | Austria | Wiener Stadthalle | —N/a | —N/a |
| September 1, 1999 | Zürich | Switzerland | Hallenstadion | —N/a | —N/a |
| September 2, 1999 | Munich | Germany | Open-Air Theatron | —N/a | —N/a |
| September 4, 1999 | Hamburg | Germany | Derby-Park Klein Flottbek | —N/a | —N/a |
| September 5, 1999 | Berlin | Germany | Waldbühne | —N/a | —N/a |
| September 7, 1999 | Rotterdam | Netherlands | Rotterdam Ahoy Sportpaleis | —N/a | —N/a |
| September 9, 1999 | Sheffield | England | Sheffield Arena | —N/a | —N/a |
| September 11, 1999 | Birmingham | England | NEC Arena | —N/a | —N/a |
| September 12, 1999 | Birmingham | England | NEC Arena | —N/a | —N/a |
| September 15, 1999 | London | England | Wembley Arena | —N/a | —N/a |
| September 16, 1999 | London | England | Wembley Arena | —N/a | —N/a |
| September 18, 1999 | London | England | Wembley Arena | —N/a | —N/a |
| September 21, 1999 | Paris | France | Palais Omnisports de Paris-Bercy | —N/a | —N/a |
| September 22, 1999 | Stuttgart | Germany | Hanns-Martin-Schleyer-Halle | —N/a | —N/a |
| September 24, 1999 | Cologne | Germany | Kölnarena | —N/a | —N/a |
| September 25, 1999 | Antwerp | Belgium | Sportpaleis | —N/a | —N/a |
| September 27, 1999 | Milan | Italy | FilaForum | —N/a | —N/a |
| September 28, 1999 | Cologne | Germany | Kölnarena | —N/a | —N/a |
| October 1, 1999 | Gothenburg | Sweden | Scandinavium | —N/a | —N/a |
| October 2, 1999 | Stockholm | Sweden | Stockholm Globe Arena | —N/a | —N/a |
| October 4, 1999 | Helsinki | Finland | Hartwall Areena | —N/a | —N/a |
| October 5, 1999 | Helsinki | Finland | Hartwall Areena | —N/a | —N/a |
| October 6, 1999 | Moscow | Russia | State Kremlin Palace | —N/a | —N/a |
| October 7, 1999 | Moscow | Russia | State Kremlin Palace | —N/a | —N/a |
| October 9, 1999 | Kyiv | Ukraine | Palace of Sports | —N/a | —N/a |
| October 10, 1999 | Stuttgart | Germany | Hanns-Martin-Schleyer-Halle | —N/a | —N/a |
| October 12, 1999 | Rotterdam | Netherlands | Rotterdam Ahoy Sportpaleis | —N/a | —N/a |
| October 13, 1999 | Rotterdam | Netherlands | Rotterdam Ahoy Sportpaleis | —N/a | —N/a |
| October 15, 1999 | Zürich | Switzerland | Hallenstadion | —N/a | —N/a |
| October 18, 1999 | Frankfurt | Germany | Festhalle Frankfurt | —N/a | —N/a |
| October 20, 1999 | Milan | Italy | FilaForum | —N/a | —N/a |
| October 22, 1999 | Vienna | Austria | Wiener Stadthalle | —N/a | —N/a |
| October 23, 1999 | Vienna | Austria | Wiener Stadthalle | —N/a | —N/a |
| October 27, 1999 | Leipzig | Germany | Leipziger Messehallen 7 | —N/a | —N/a |
| October 28, 1999 | Munich | Germany | Olympiahalle | —N/a | —N/a |
| October 30, 1999 | Oberhausen | Germany | Arena Oberhausen | —N/a | —N/a |
| October 31, 1999 | Oberhausen | Germany | Arena Oberhausen | —N/a | —N/a |
| November 2, 1999 | Antwerp | Belgium | Sportpaleis | —N/a | —N/a |
| November 3, 1999 | Kiel | Germany | Ostseehalle | —N/a | —N/a |
| November 5, 1999 | Stuttgart | Germany | Hanns-Martin-Schleyer-Halle | —N/a | —N/a |
| November 7, 1999 | Birmingham | England | NEC Arena | —N/a | —N/a |
| November 8, 1999 | London | England | Wembley Arena | —N/a | —N/a |

Festivals and other miscellaneous performances
^{A} This concert is a part of the "Sopot International Song Festival"
^{B} This concert is a part of "Stoppelmarkt"
^{C} This concert is a part of the "Open-Air-Wochenende"

Cancellations and rescheduled shows

| July 3, 1999 | Newark, New Jersey | Prudential Hall | Cancelled |
| July 5, 1999 | Washington, D.C. | DAR Constitution Hall | Cancelled |
| July 23, 1999 | Memphis, Tennessee | Mid-South Coliseum | Cancelled |
| July 24, 1999 | St. Louis, Missouri | Fox Theatre | Cancelled |
| August 1, 1999 | Concord, California | Concord Pavilion | Cancelled |
| September 28, 1999 | Prague, Czech Republic | Sportovní hala | Cancelled |

== Personnel ==
Band

- Musical director / Drums – Michael Baker
- Bass guitar – Alex Evans
- Keyboards – Jetro Da Silva
- Percussion – Taku Hirano
- Guitar – John "Jubu" Smith
- Piano – Myron McKinley
- Background vocalists – Gary Houston, Valerie Pinkston, Sharlotte Gibson, Cindy Mizelle

Dancers

- Carolyn Brown, Kyndra Reevey, Merylin Mitchell, Joyce Vanhook

Tour management

- Manager – Tony Bulluck

Security

- Director of security – Alan Jacobs

== Broadcasting and recordings ==
- Houston's concert on August 22, in Sopot, Poland was televised on Germany, United Kingdom and Poland cable TV.
- Live performances of "I Learned From the Best" was televised during UNCF benefit telethon broadcast, and "It's Not Right But Its Okay" performance was aired on the MTV series All Access Live.
