= I Learned from the Best =

- International CD single cover

Single by Whitney Houston

from the album My Love Is Your Love
- B-side: "You'll Never Stand Alone"
- Released: November 15, 1999
- Studio: Chartmaker (Malibu, California)
- Length: 4:20 (album version); 3:56 (radio edit)
- Label: Arista
- Songwriter: Diane Warren
- Producers: David Foster; Whitney Houston

Whitney Houston singles chronology
"My Love Is Your Love" (1999)	"I Learned from the Best" (1999)	"Same Script, Different Cast" (2000)

Music video
- "I Learned from the Best" on YouTube

"I Learned from the Best" is a song recorded by American singer Whitney Houston. The ballad, written by American songwriter Diane Warren and produced by Canadian-American producer David Foster, was one of three songs Warren wrote for Houston's fourth studio album, My Love Is Your Love (1998). The song describes a woman rejecting her former lover's attempts at reconciliation, having learned from his previous treatment of her. Houston, who advised Foster on the production, also served as the song's vocal arranger. The song was released as the album's fifth and final single in November 1999.

Critics generally praised "I Learned from the Best" as a strong, polished ballad that showcased Houston's vocal performance, though some considered it formulaic or a conventional "Whitney-style" ballad. Commercially, "I Learned from the Best" was less successful than the album's preceding singles, although it reached number one in Poland and Romania, the top 10 in several European markets, number 19 on the UK Singles Chart, and number 27 on the US Billboard Hot 100, while dance and house remixes by Hex Hector and Junior Vasquez led also to the song topping the US Dance Club Songs chart.

The accompanying music video was directed by Kevin Bray and filmed in Cologne in October 1999. It depicts Houston performing the song for a small audience while a man, presumably the former lover addressed in the lyrics, watches from a distance. The video premiered on Making the Video on November 2, 1999. Houston performed the song at several events, including the 1999 Bambi Awards and the 42nd Annual Grammy Awards in 2000, and promoted its single release through appearances on Top of the Pops, The Oprah Winfrey Show, and The Tonight Show with Jay Leno.

== Recording and composition ==
"I Learned from the Best" was written by Diane Warren, who had previously written Houston's 1989 duet "It Isn't, It Wasn't, It Ain't Never Gonna Be," performed with her longtime family friend Aretha Franklin, as well as the sentimental ballad "You Were Loved," which Houston recorded for the soundtrack to The Preacher's Wife. The song originated from Warren's enthusiasm for a chord progression and concept she had developed, particularly the chorus, which she recalled being especially excited about while writing it. She subsequently brought the song to Clive Davis, who recognized it as a suitable song for Houston's upcoming fourth studio album, My Love Is Your Love. Warren was pleased with Davis's decision to have Houston record the song and described the composition as having a "James Bond kind of thing." Producer David Foster subsequently incorporated a Chicago-style horn sound into the arrangement, giving the recording what Warren characterized as a classic feel. According to Houston, she was the one who convinced Foster to add the "Chicago horns" to the song, having been a fan of the band and aware of Foster's previous collaborations with them.

"I Learned from the Best" was one of three songs Warren contributed to My Love Is Your Love, alongside "I Bow Out" and "You'll Never Stand Alone." Houston herself emphasized the emotional quality she sought in a song when discussing her approach to selecting material for My Love Is Your Love. Asked what she looked for in a song at the time, she answered, "Passion. Any form of passion but mostly love," citing "I Learned from the Best" as an example, praising the song's portrayal of heartbreak and emotional retaliation. Houston described the song as "very melodramatic," portraying the different experiences of life, including "pain," "glory," and "joy," while viewing its message of having learned from a past relationship as ultimately positive. Musically, it is a pop and R&B song with elements of pop rock, performed at a slow tempo of 84 beats per minute. The song begins in G-sharp minor before modulating to A minor near the end. Houston's vocal range spans from D♯3 to C5, with the performance culminating in a sustained soprano note lasting approximately 12 seconds. The lyrics portray a woman who refuses to reconcile with a former lover after repeatedly being hurt by him. Having previously taken him back despite his betrayal, she now turns the lessons of their relationship against him, telling him that she has learned from his example: "I learned from the best / I learned from you."

== Critical reception ==
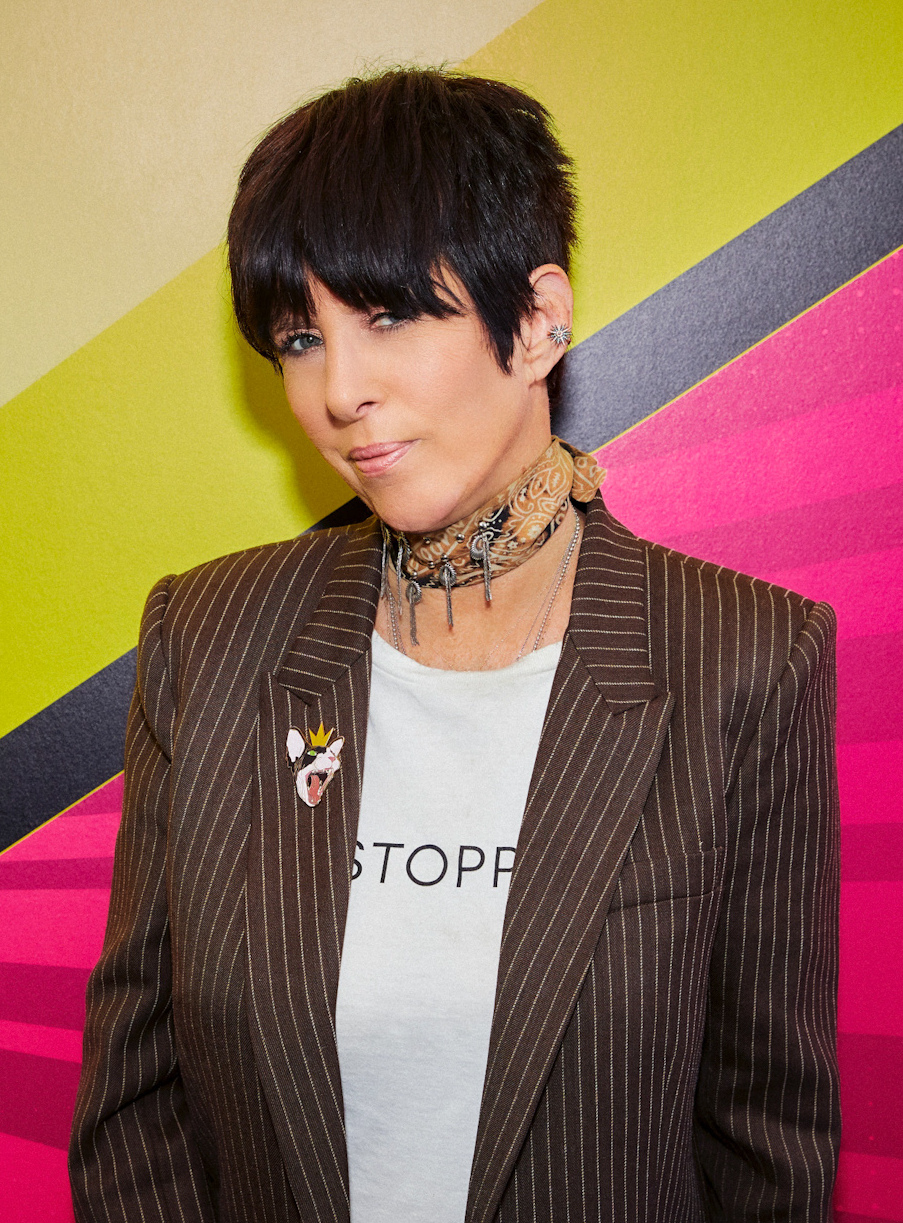
Writer Diane Warren was praised for her composition.

"I Learned from the Best" received mixed reviews from music critics, with several praising Houston's vocal performance, the song's polished production, and its return to the dramatic ballad style associated with her earlier work, while others criticized it as formulaic, overly sentimental, or overly familiar.

Chuck Taylor from Billboard gave the song a particularly favorable review, describing it as a "gorgeous ballad" that would return listeners to the "sacred territory" of Houston's earlier classics, and praising her "spine-chilling performance." Taylor also commended Warren's songwriting and Foster's "forceful instrumental package," concluding that the collaboration between Houston, Warren, and Foster brought together "the best of their talents." Nekesa Mumbi Moody of the Associated Press similarly praised Houston's vocals, writing that the song "sound[s] decent with her pipes." Music Week described the track as "more familiar Whitneyesque ground" and a "big ballad," while Chuck Campbell of the Knoxville News Sentinel called it a "classy David Foster-produced" song and described Houston as "predictably stately." Christopher Tkaczyk of The Michigan Daily characterized it as a "heart-racing R&B track," while Sun-Sentinel selected it as the album's "one truly satisfying song" on parent album My Love Is Your Love, describing it as an "unassuming ballad."

Jose F. Promis of AllMusic described the original as a "dramatic, classic Whitney-styled" ballad, but found the dance remix more effective, praising the Jr. Vasquez "Disco Mix" for its "irresistibly funky beat" while noting that Houston's vocals could sound "a little forced" over the Hi-NRG production; he ultimately preferred the original ballad. Other reviewers were more critical of the song's conventional approach and sentimental tone. Sonia Murray from Cox News Service characterized it as a "by-the-numbers big ballad," suggesting that it adhered closely to the established formula of Houston's traditional ballads. Henrik Bæk of Danish Gaffa likewise called it a "typical Whitney ballad." Charles Waring of Blues & Soul was more dismissive, criticizing the song as "syrupy" and objecting to its "schmaltzy gloss." John Soeder, writing for The Plain Dealer, offered the harshest assessment, calling it a "lackluster Diane Warren ballad."

== Commercial performance ==
"I Learned from the Best" was released as the fifth and final single from My Love Is Your Love, with the single issued in the United Kingdom on November 29, 1999, and in the United States in 2000. Although it was less successful than the album's preceding singles, it achieved several notable chart positions, particularly on dance and R&B charts. In the United States, it debuted at number 83 on the Billboard Hot 100 and peaked at number 27, while reaching number 13 on the Hot R&B Singles & Tracks chart and number 20 on Adult Contemporary. Its dance-oriented remixes, produced by Hex Hector and Junior Vasquez, performed substantially better, with the song reaching number one on Billboard's Dance Club Songs chart and number three on its 2000 year-end chart. It also ranked 24th on the decade-end Dance/Club Play Songs chart for 2000–2009.

In Europe, "I Learned from the Best" achieved varied chart results, ranging from relatively modest positions in some markets to some of the highest peaks among the singles released from My Love Is Your Love. It topped the airplay charts in Poland and Romania, where it also ranked ninth on Romania's 2000 year-end chart. It reached the top 10 in Iceland (number 3), Finland (number 6), Spain (number 8), and Hungary (number 10), while reaching number 18 in Ireland, and the top 30 in the Netherlands, Sweden, Switzerland, Scotland, and the Czech Republic. On the Eurochart Hot 100, it peaked at number 41. In the United Kingdom, the song peaked at number 19 on the UK Singles Chart, selling approximately 95,000 copies, while performing better on the UK R&B chart, where it peaked at number five.

== Music video ==
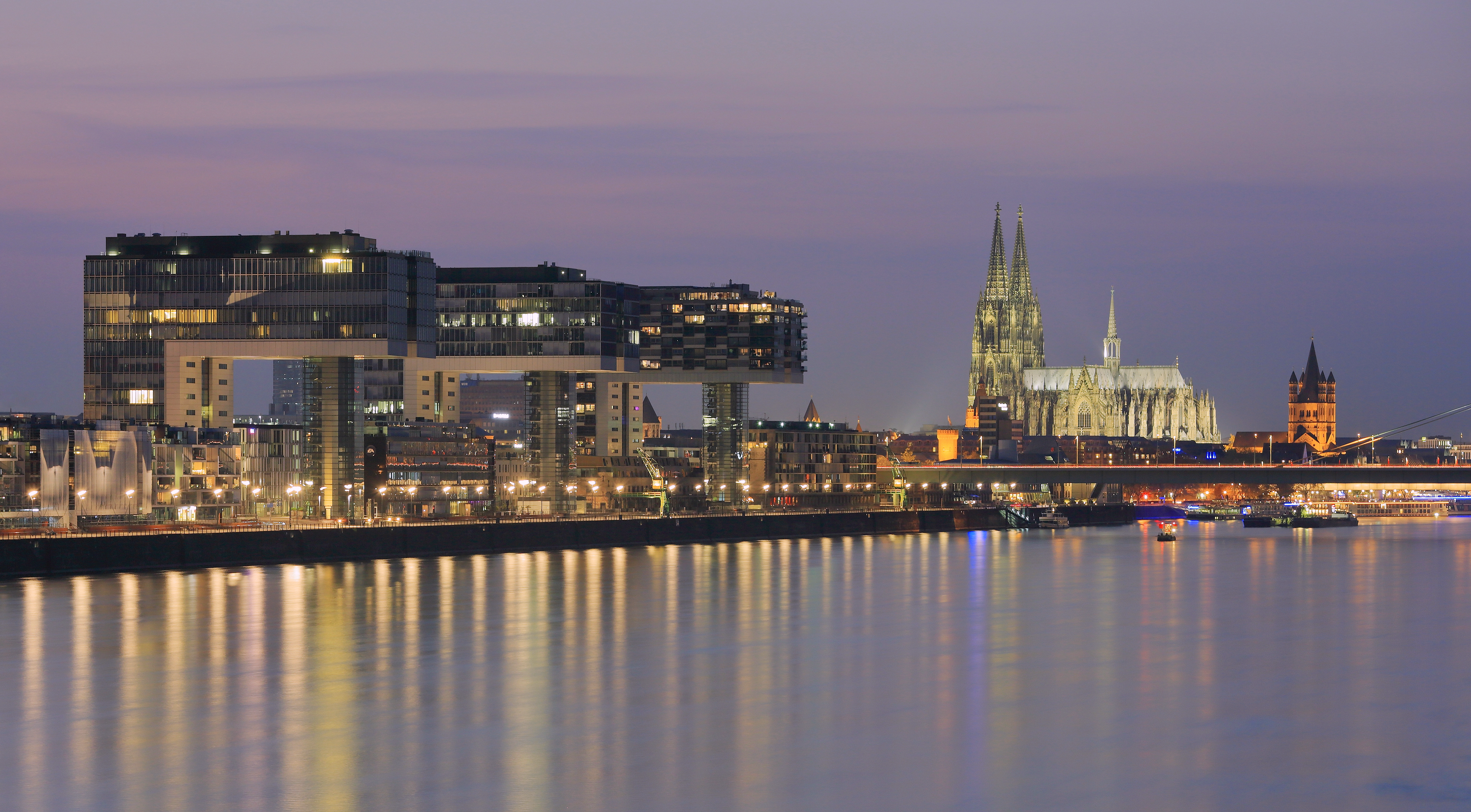
Filming of the video for "I Learned from the Best" took place in Cologne.

A music video for "I Learned from the Best" was directed by Kevin Bray, who had collaborated with Houston on several videos during the My Love Is Your Love era, and filmed on October 7, 1999, at a sports arena in Cologne, Germany. Short during the European leg of Houston's My Love Is Your Love World Tour, production was completed within a tightly scheduled 12–14-hour window to accommodate her touring commitments. The visuals were conceived as a staged television performance, with Houston portraying a singer performing the song live for the first time while her former lover watches from the audience and gradually realizes that the song is about their relationship. The concept was designed to reflect the song's themes of heartbreak and personal growth while emphasizing Houston's ability as a live performer.

The video was filmed on a futuristic, stylized television set featuring a performance stage, control room, television monitors, and an audience of approximately 150–160 people. Multiple cameras, including crane and Steadicam setups, were used to recreate the movement and atmosphere of a live concert, while intercut scenes focus on the former lover, played by a German model, whose expressions convey his growing realization and regret. The production also featured a distinctive visual style influenced by the 1960s, with Houston's hair and makeup described by the production team as an "Angela Davis Rebirth" look. Following the one-day shoot, the footage was sent to Los Angeles for editing. The completed video premiered on November 2, 1999 on MTV's Making the Video.

== Formats and track listings ==
- UK CD 1
1. "I Learned from the Best" (Radio Edit) – 3:55
2. "I Will Always Love You" (Hex Hector Club Mix) – 9:52
3. "It's Not Right, But It's Okay" (Thunderpuss Radio Mix) – 4:26
- UK CD 2 – The Remixes
1. "I Learned from the Best" (Album Version) – 4:20
2. "I Learned from the Best" (HQ2 Uptempo Radio Mix) – 4:23
3. "I Learned from the Best" (Junior Vasquez UK Club Mix) – 11:37
- US CD single
1. "I Learned from the Best" (Album Version) – 4:20
2. "I Learned from the Best" (HQ2 Uptempo Radio Mix) – 4:23
3. "I Learned from the Best" (Junior Vasquez Disco Radio Mix) – 4:22
- US CD maxi single
1. "I Learned from the Best" (HQ2 Uptempo Radio Mix) – 4:23
2. "I Learned from the Best" (Junior Vasquez Disco Radio Mix) – 4:22
3. "I Learned from the Best" (HQ2 Club Mix) – 10:37
4. "I Learned from the Best" (Junior Vasquez USA Millennium Mix) – 11:37
5. "I Learned from the Best" (Junior Vasquez Disco Club Mix) – 9:21
6. "I Learned from the Best" (HQ2 Dub) – 8:56
7. "I Learned from the Best" (Junior Vasquez UK Radio Mix) – 4:59
8. "I Learned from the Best" (Original Version) – 4:09

Note: The Junior Vasquez Disco mix is unique in that Houston re-recorded her vocals for this version.

== Charts ==
=== Weekly charts ===
Chart (1999–2000)	Peak position
Australia (ARIA)	116
Belgium (Ultratip Bubbling Under Flanders)	8
Czech Republic (IFPI)	15
Europe (Eurochart Hot 100)	41
Finland (Suomen virallinen lista)	6
France (SNEP)	44
Germany (GfK)	48
Hungary (MAHASZ)	10
Iceland (Íslenski Listinn Topp 40)	3
Ireland (IRMA)	18
Latvia (Latvijas Top 197)	19
Netherlands (Dutch Top 40)	20
Netherlands (Single Top 100)	34
Poland Airplay (Music & Media)	1
Romania (Romanian Top 100)	1
Scotland (OCC)	27
Spain (PROMUSICAE)	8
Sweden (Sverigetopplistan)	23
Switzerland (Schweizer Hitparade)	28
UK Singles (Official Charts)	19
UK Hip Hop/R&B (Official Charts)	5
UK Airplay (Music Week)	23
US Billboard Hot 100	27
US Adult Contemporary (Billboard)	20
US Dance Club Songs (Billboard)	1
US Hot R&B/Hip-Hop Songs (Billboard)	13
US Adult R&B Songs (Billboard)	3

=== Year-end charts ===
Chart (1999)	Position
Netherlands (Dutch Top 40)	195

Chart (2000)	Position
Finland (Suomen virallinen lista)	24
Romania (Romanian Top 100)	9
US Dance Club Play (Billboard)	3
US Hot R&B/Hip-Hop Singles & Tracks (Billboard)	82
US Maxi-Singles Sales (Billboard)	19

=== Decade-end charts ===
Chart (2000–2009)	Position
US Dance/Club Play Songs (Billboard)	24

== Release history ==
Region	Date	Format(s)	Label(s)	Ref(s).
Sweden	November 15, 1999	CD	Arista; BMG	
United States	November 22, 1999	Adult contemporary; hot adult contemporary radio	Arista	
United States	November 23, 1999	Urban adult contemporary radio	Arista	
United Kingdom	November 29, 1999	CD1; cassette	Artista; BMG	
United Kingdom	December 6, 1999	CD2	Artista; BMG	
United States	December 7, 1999	Urban radio	Arista	
United States	January 11, 2000	Rhythmic contemporary radio	Arista	
United States	February 29, 2000	Contemporary hit radio	Arista	

== See also ==
- Number-one dance hits of 2000 (USA)
- List of Romanian Top 100 number ones of the 2000s
