= Kevin Bray (director) =

American film director

- Education: University of Michigan
- Occupations: Film director, television director, commercial director, music video director
- Years active: 1988–present

Kevin Bray is an American film, television, commercial and music video director. Bray attended the University of Michigan and the University of Paris (Sorbonne) before completing his studies at New York University's Tisch School of the Arts. Bray also goes by his initials, KGB. Bray is the brother of record producer, Stephen Bray.

== Career ==
Beginning his career as a music video director, Bray has directed music videos for a number of artists, including Anita Baker, Jessica Simpson, Jennifer Lopez, Brandy, Christina Aguilera, Lauryn Hill, De La Soul, Whitney Houston, Savage Garden, Celine Dion, among others.

=== Film ===
- Friday After Next (2002, Second Unit Director)
- All About the Benjamins (2002)
- Walking Tall (2004)
- Linewatch (2008)

=== Television ===
==== Director ====
- Best Medicine (1 episode, 2026)
- I Love LA (2 episodes, 2025)
- The Penguin (2 episodes, 2024)
- Clipped (3 episodes, 2024)
- Unprisoned (1 episode, 2023)
- The Patient (3 episodes, 2022)
- Rap Shit (1 episode, 2022)
- Loot (4 episodes, 2022-2024)
- The Game (1 episode, 2021)
- Snowfall (1 episode, 2021)
- Run (1 episode, 2020)
- Shameless (1 episode, 2020)
- The Morning Show (1 episode, 2019)
- Succession (2 episodes, 2019-2021)
- Black-ish (8 episodes, 2015–2022)
- Pearson (3 episodes, 2019)
- Mike Epps: Only One Mike (Netflix special)
- Bless This Mess (1 episode, 2019)
- Future Man (2 episodes, 2019)
- Dear White People (1 episode, 2018)
- Insecure (5 episodes; 2016–2018)
- The Americans (2 episodes, 2017–2018)
- Fresh Off the Boat (2 episodes, 2017–2018)
- Grown-ish (1 episode, 2018)
- The Mayor (1 episode, 2017)
- The Real O'Neals (1 episode, 2017)
- Shooter (1 episode, 2017)
- Zoobiquity (TV movie, 2016)
- Empire (2 episodes, 2016)
- Suits (12 episodes, 2011–2016)
- Suits (Webisodes, 2012)
- Agent X (1 episode, 2015)
- How to Get Away with Murder (1 episode, 2015)
- Scandal (1 episode, 2015)
- Person of Interest (2 episodes, 2012–2015)
- Stalker (2 episodes, 2014–2015)
- CSI: Crime Scene Investigation (1 episode, 2014)
- Satisfaction (2 episodes, 2014)
- Franklin & Bash (2 episodes, 2012–2014)
- White Collar (4 episodes, 2009–2013)
- The Arrangement (TV movie, 2013)
- Law & Order: Special Victims Unit (1 episode, 2013)
- The Killing (1 episode, 2012)
- Charlie's Angels (1 episode, 2011)
- NCIS: Los Angeles (1 episode, 2011)
- Memphis Beat (1 episode, 2010)
- Burn Notice (3 episodes, 2010)
- The Good Guys (1 episode, 2010)
- Law & Order: Criminal Intent (3 episodes, 2010)
- The Vampire Diaries (2 episodes, 2009–2010)
- Cold Case (12 episodes, 2004–2009)
- Chuck (1 episode, 2009)
- The Black Donnellys (1 episode, 2007)
- Heroes (1 episode, 2007)
- Justice (1 episode, 2006)
- Close to Home (1 episode, 2006)
- In Justice (1 episode, 2006)
- The Studio (TV series, 2005)
- Veronica Mars (1 episode, 2005)
- Criminal Minds (1 episode, 2005)
- Barbershop (1 episode, 2005)
- Silver Lake (TV movie, 2004)
- CSI: NY (1 episode, 2004)
- Platinum (2 episodes, 2003)
- The Twilight Zone (1 episode, 2003)
- The Bernie Mac Show (1 episode, 2003)
- Elmopalooza (Segment director, 1998)

==== Executive producer and/or director ====
- Platinum
- Pearson (Executive producer – 7 episodes, 2019)
- Zoobiquity (TV movie, 2016)
- The Arrangement (TV movie, 2013) (Co-executive producer)
- Suits (Co-executive producer – 16 episodes, 2012 – 2013; Supervising producer – 12 episodes, 2011 – 2012)

==== Producer ====
- Platinum (2003)

==== Actor ====
- All About the Benjamins (2002; role: Criminal)
- Billy Turner's Secret (1991; role: Party People)

==== Documentary appearances ====
- Jean-Michel Basquiat: The Radiant Child (2004)
- Biography, Episode: "The Rock" (2004)
- Fight the Good Fight (2002; Director)
- Whitney Houston: The True Story (2002; Video Director)
- All About the Stunts (Video documentary short) (2002)
- Miami Nice (Video documentary short) (2002)
- Shot Caller: From Videos to Features (Video documentary short) (2002)
- Strictly Business: Making 'All About the Benjamins' (Video documentary short) (1999)
- Making the Video (TV documentary series) (1999), featuring the making of Whitney Houston's videos for the singles "I Learned From The Best" and "Where You Are".

==== Commercials ====
- USA Network
- Nike
- Puma
- Verizon
- Florida Lottery

=== Music videos ===
1988

- De La Soul – "Potholes in My Lawn"

1991

- Eric B. & Rakim – "Juice (Know the Ledge)"

1992

- Black Sheep – "Strobelite Honey"
- Vanessa Williams – "Save the Best For Last" (holiday version)
- Sounds of Blackness – "Testify"

1994

- Vanessa Williams – "The Sweetest Days" (romantic and urban versions)
- Patti LaBelle – "All This Love"

1995

- Diana King – "Ain't Nobody"
- Monica – "Before You Walk Out of My Life"

1996

- For Real – "Like I Do"
- Meshell Ndegeocello – "Leviticus: Faggot"
- Monica – "Why I Love You So Much"
- Celine Dion – "Because You Loved Me"
- The Corrs – "The Right Time"
- Aaron Neville – "Can't Stop My Heart From Loving You (The Rain Song)"
- Robyn – "Do You Know (What It Takes)"
- Luther Vandross – "Your Secret Love"

1997

- Ben Folds Five – "Brick"
- Mary J. Blige feat. Lil' Kim – "I Can Love You"
- Robyn – "Show Me Love"

1998

- Brandy – "Have You Ever?"

1999

- Jennifer Lopez – "No Me Ames"
- Savage Garden – "I Knew I Loved You"
- Whitney Houston – "I Learned from the Best"
- Brandy – "Almost Doesn't Count"
- Whitney Houston – "My Love Is Your Love"
- Whitney Houston – "It's Not Right But It's Okay"
- Whitney Houston, Faith Evans and Kelly Price – "Heartbreak Hotel"

2000

- Whitney Houston and George Michael – "If I Told You That"
- Christina Aguilera – "Pero Me Acuerdo de Ti"
- Whitney Houston – "Fine"
- Jessica Simpson and Nick Lachey – "Where You Are"

2002

- Whitney Houston – "One of Those Days"
- Deborah Cox – "Up & Down (In & Out)"
- Whitney Houston – "Whatchulookinat"

2008

- Ashanti – "The Way That I Love You"

=== Awards and nominations ===
- Hugo Award for Best Dramatic Presentation: Heroes, Season One (Nomination, 2006)
