= My Love Is Your Love =

Studio album by Whitney Houston
- Released: November 17, 1998
- Recorded: August–October 1998
- Studios: Crossway; Soulpower; The Hit Factory; Brandon's Way; Right Track; R.J.'s Studio
- Genres: R&B; hip hop; pop
- Length: 60:35
- Label: Arista
- Producers: Whitney Houston; Kenneth "Babyface" Edmonds; Kelvin Bradshaw; Lloyd "Spec" Turner; Clive Davis; Jerry 'Wonder' Duplessis; Missy "Misdemeanor" Elliott; David Foster; Lauryn Hill; Wyclef Jean; Rodney "Darkchild" Jerkins; Soulshock and Karlin

Whitney Houston chronology
The Preacher's Wife: Original Soundtrack Album (1996)	My Love Is Your Love (1998)	Whitney: The Greatest Hits (2000)

Singles from My Love Is Your Love
- 1. "When You Believe" Released: November 2, 1998; 2. "Heartbreak Hotel" Released: December 15, 1998; 3. "It's Not Right but It's Okay" Released: February 15, 1999; 4. "My Love Is Your Love" Released: May 31, 1999; 5. "I Learned from the Best" Released: November 15, 1999

My Love Is Your Love is the fourth studio album by American singer Whitney Houston. It was released on November 17, 1998 by Arista Records and marked her first studio album in eight years following I'm Your Baby Tonight (1990), after a successful run of film soundtrack projects. Executive produced by Houston and Clive Davis and inspired by the rise of contemporary R&B and hip hop, the album represented a significant musical reinvention for the singer, with production handled by Rodney "Darkchild" Jerkins, Missy Elliott, Wyclef Jean, Babyface, David Foster, and others, alongside guest appearances from Faith Evans, Kelly Price, Mariah Carey, and Bobbi Kristina Brown.

Upon its release, My Love Is Your Love received some of the strongest reviews of Houston's career, with critics praising its contemporary R&B direction, vocal maturity, and stylistic diversity, while a few viewed its mix of modern and traditional ballads as uneven. Commercially, the album was a worldwide success, reaching the top of the charts in several European countries, peaking at number 13 on the US Billboard 200, and earning quadruple platinum certifications in both the United States and Europe. It has sold an estimated 10 million copies worldwide, making it one of best-selling albums of all time by a female artist.

The album spawned five successful singles, including the Academy Award-winning duet "When You Believe," the Grammy-winning "It's Not Right but It's Okay," the international hit single "My Love Is Your Love," and the US top-five hit "Heartbreak Hotel," a collaboration with Evans and Price. To further promote the album, Houston embarked on the My Love Is Your Love World Tour in 1999, whose European leg became the continent's highest-grossing arena tour during 1999. Nominated in multiple categories at the American Music Awards, Grammy Awards, NAACP Image Awards, Soul Train Music Awards, My Love Is Your Love went on to win International Album of the Year at the NRJ Music Awards.

== Background ==
By 1997, Houston had established a highly successful career spanning music and film. Following her film debut in The Bodyguard (1992), she increasingly divided her time between acting and music, while continuing to record and perform. The soundtrack to the film became the best-selling album of her career and one of the best-selling albums of all time, largely driven by "I Will Always Love You," which became a global commercial success, the best-selling single of all time by a female artist and also earned Houston the Grammy Award for Album of the Year. Houston continued to contribute music to her subsequent film projects, recording three songs for the soundtrack to Waiting to Exhale (1995), while the soundtrack to The Preacher's Wife (1996) became the best-selling gospel album of all time. She also served as an executive producer and starred in the musical television film Cinderella (1997). However, its soundtrack remained unreleased because of label conflicts. Despite her continued presence in music through soundtrack recordings and live performances, Houston had not released a studio album since I'm Your Baby Tonight (1990), marking the longest gap between full-length album projects in her career.

As Houston pursued opportunities outside the recording studio, including lucrative overseas engagements and private performances, Arista Records chairman Clive Davis became increasingly concerned about her prolonged absence from the recording industry. He had sought to develop a greatest hits album for Houston as early as 1995, with Billboard reporting plans for its release that October. The project was subsequently postponed, with the publication again reporting in July 1996 that the album was expected that fall. Its release was delayed once more, and speculation surrounding the project continued into 1997, when Houston acknowledged that Davis was pressing her to record it. Davis eventually appealed directly to Houston, writing her a letter in 1997 in which he noted that she had "not recorded a studio album in seven years" and had released only a limited number of new recordings during that period, most of which had been associated with her film projects. He characterized her as "practically missing in action" as a contemporary recording artist and urged her to return to the studio. According to Davis, Houston responded positively to the letter and agreed to resume recording. The two subsequently began searching material initially intended for inclusion on a greatest hits compilation.

== Recording ==
=== Initial sessions ===
What began as a search for material to supplement a planned greatest hits album gradually developed into a full studio project. In August 1998, following the conclusion of a brief European tour, Houston and Davis were approached by Jeffrey Katzenberg of DreamWorks to record a contemporary version of "When You Believe" for the soundtrack to the forthcoming animated film The Prince of Egypt. Produced by Babyface, the song was developed as a duet with Mariah Carey, although Houston was initially unaware of the planned collaboration. She nevertheless welcomed the opportunity to work with Carey, viewing the duet as a way to dispel persistent rumors of a rivalry between the two singers. Following the recording, Arista Records, Columbia Records, and DreamWorks Records arranged for the song to appear on several forthcoming releases: Houston's new album, Carey's first compilation album, Number Ones, and the soundtrack to The Prince of Egypt. At this stage, however, Houston's project was still expected to be a compilation rather than a new studio album.

The recording of "When You Believe," coupled with growing expectations that the song would become a major promotional event and provide a powerful vehicle for the project, prompted Arista to reconsider its scope. Initially, the label remained committed to releasing the song as part of the planned greatest hits package, supplemented by several new recordings. As Davis continued reviewing submissions for Houston, he and Houston initially selected "three or four tracks" that they intended to include in the compilation. Among the early selections were three songs written by Diane Warren, including "I Learned from the Best", "I Bow Out" and "You'll Never Stand Alone." Warren had worked with Houston only intermittently, and the three songs were reportedly selected in part because both Houston and Warren had wanted Houston to record them. David Foster was later assigned to produce "I Learned from the Best," while Houston reunited with Babyface for the other two songs. Babyface also contributed the torch ballad "Until You Come Back," co-written with Daryl Simmons and recorded at his Brandon's Way studio in Los Angeles.

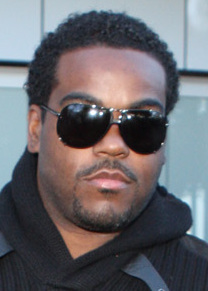
Rodney Jerkins' "It's Not Right but It's Okay" marked a turning point in the project's development.

Rodney "Darkchild" Jerkins subsequently submitted a number of demos after Davis asked him to provide material for the project, having previously worked with Jerkins on Monica's "Angel of Mine" and Deborah Cox's One Wish. According to Davis, "It's Not Right but It's Okay" was the first of Jerkins' songs presented to him and Houston. Houston reportedly responded enthusiastically to the track, dancing and singing along before agreeing to record it. The recording was delayed for several days, however, as Houston was suffering from bronchitis at the time. At Davis' request, Jerkins and his team of writers, including his brother Fred Jerkins III, cousin LaShawn Daniels, and Toni Estes, subsequently supplied "Get It Back" and "If I Told You That," the latter of which was initially intended as a duet with Michael Jackson, who ultimately declined the collaboration. Houston recorded the songs at her Crossway studio and at Jerkins' studio in Pleasantville.

=== Expansion of the project ===
The addition of "It's Not Right but It's Okay" proved pivotal in changing the direction of the project, encouraging Davis to expand the roster of producers and songwriters involved and ultimately shifting the project from a greatest hits package toward a new studio album. After Houston had recorded the material from Jerkins, Babyface, and Foster, Davis contacted Missy Elliott and played her some of the recordings over the telephone. Elliott expressed an immediate interest in participating. Their collaboration resulted in the contemporary hip-hop track "In My Business." Following the recording, Elliott contacted Davis again to express her enthusiasm about the session and offered to contribute another song. She subsequently submitted "Oh Yes." Around the same time, Davis learned that TLC had rejected the R&B song "Heartbreak Hotel," written by Tamara Savage and Soulshock & Karlin. He selected the song for Houston and proposed recording it as a collaboration with the then-rising R&B singers Faith Evans and Kelly Price.

Further collaborations with Wyclef Jean and Lauryn Hill, both members of the Fugees, were arranged later in the production process. Davis approached Jean about producing for Houston, who recalled that he "came in at the last minute." During the sessions for "My Love Is Your Love," Houston's daughter Bobbi Kristina was present at the studio. Jean and his co-producer Jerry "Wonder" Duplessis subsequently recorded the then-five-year-old encouraging her mother, with Houston approving the inclusion of the recording. Hill became involved after learning that Houston had returned to the studio and reaching out to her about a possible collaboration. Houston had been particularly interested in working with Hill following her production of Aretha Franklin's "A Rose Is Still a Rose" (1998), but scheduling conflicts prevented them from collaborating on Hill's proposed song "All That I Can Say," which later went to Mary J. Blige. Houston instead suggested a contemporary reinterpretation of Stevie Wonder's "I Was Made to Love Him." The resulting collaboration was the final one completed during the album's production and was ultimately included only as a bonus track.

The volume and quality of the submissions ultimately convinced Davis and Houston to continue expanding the project, as the increasingly strong material made the prospect of developing a full studio album more viable. Davis later recalled that the material arriving during the sessions was sufficiently strong and distinctive that the project would not have proceeded without it, while Houston reportedly remarked that she could continue recording as long as songs of that quality continued to arrive. Rather than seeking established names for their own sake, the selection process focused on the quality of the songs and their potential to broaden Houston's musical and vocal range. Most of the album was recorded at Houston's home studio, Crossway Studios, in Mendham, New Jersey, with additional sessions at Jerkins' studio in Pleasantville, as well as in New York City and Los Angeles. Houston typically completed the lead vocals for a song in one day, returning the following day to record background vocals and make any necessary vocal revisions. The album was completed in approximately six to seven weeks, making it the fastest-recorded studio album of Houston's career, with most sessions taking place between August and October 1998.

== Music and content ==
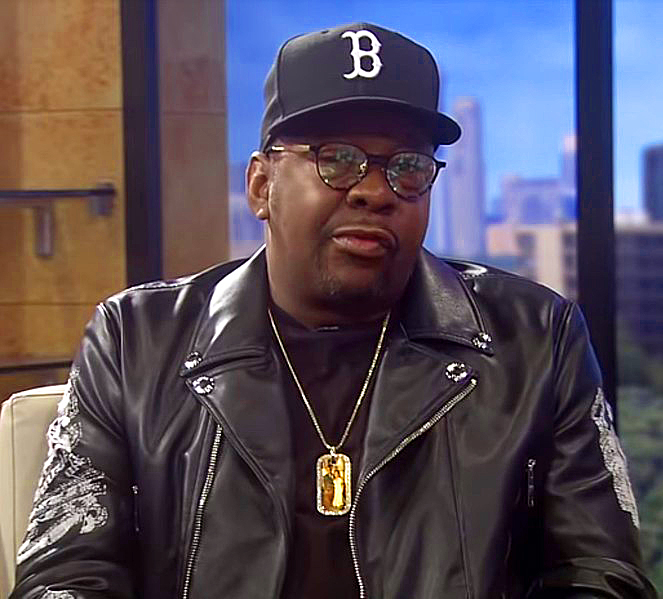
Music critics and observers cited Houston's marriage to Bobby Brown as a major influence on many of the songs on My Love Is Your Love.

My Love Is Your Love marked a stylistic shift from Houston's earlier studio work, incorporating a stronger emphasis on contemporary R&B and hip-hop alongside elements of funk, reggae fusion, and soul. The change reflected Houston's decision to work with a younger generation of producers and artists, including Elliott, Jean, and Hill, as well as the emerging European R&B production team Soulshock and Karlin. At the same time, the album retained contributions from established collaborators such as Babyface and David Foster. Houston later cited the contemporary work of Aaliyah, Brandy, Monica, and Mary J. Blige as influences on the album's musical direction.

The album also represented a departure from the predominantly romantic and inspirational material associated with much of Houston's earlier work. Speaking to Billboard around the album's release, Houston said that she was no longer interested in a "syrupy kind of vibe" and described herself as a working mother, wife, and artist, emphasizing the need to adapt to contemporary musical trends. In contrast to the "soaring romanticism" associated with songs such as "Greatest Love of All," the album presented a more contemporary and, at times, confrontational perspective. Its opening track, "It's Not Right but It's Okay," was noted for its portrayal of relationship conflict, with some listeners interpreting its lyrics as a reflection of Houston's troubled marriage to Bobby Brown. The Elliott-produced "In My Business," meanwhile, addressed the scrutiny surrounding Houston's personal life and the tabloid media.

The album's lyrical themes encompass relationships, independence, family, personal freedom, and media scrutiny, resulting in a more intimate and personal tone than was typical of Houston's earlier recordings. Nevertheless, Houston rejected the notion that the material was explicitly autobiographical. The album's liner notes included the disclaimer: "The events and characters depicted in this album are fictitious."

== Release and promotion ==
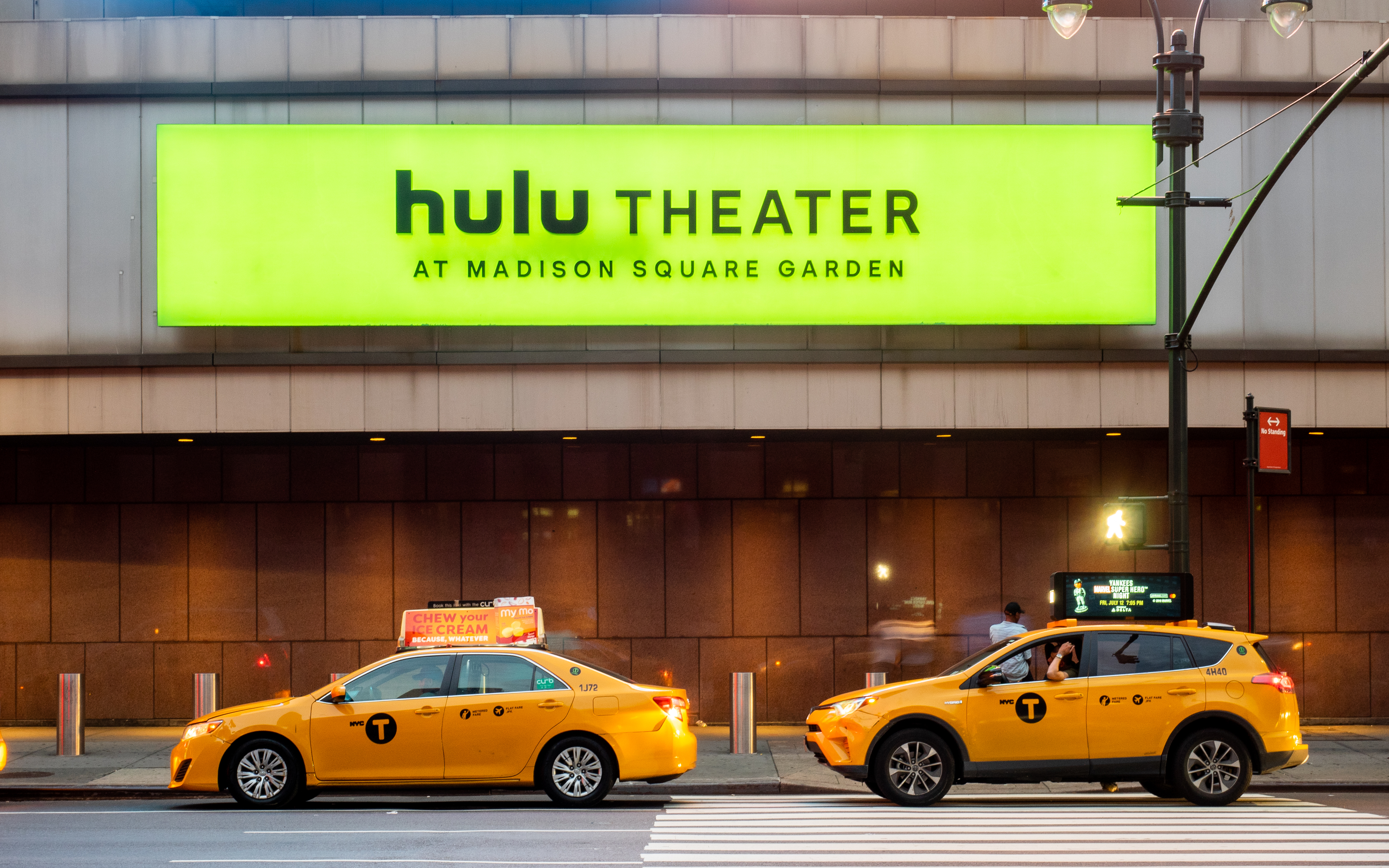
Houston headlined at The Theater at Madison Square Garden during the North American leg of her tour to promote the My Love Is Your Love album.

My Love Is Your Love was officially released worldwide on the same day, November 17, 1998. Days prior to the album's release, Houston and Clive Davis hosted several listening parties in New York and Los Angeles.

To promote the album, Houston made a number of televised appearances and live performances of the album's singles. On November 13 and 14, 1998, Houston gave two shows at the Taj Mahal in Atlantic City where she performed several of the album's songs. Two days after its release, Houston performed an expensive invitation-only charity concert at Cipriani's Wall Street's Grand Ballroom.

On November 23, 1998, Houston appeared on The Rosie O'Donnell Show where she performed "Heartbreak Hotel" with Faith Evans and Kelly Price and "My Love Is Your Love". On November 25, Houston appeared on The Oprah Winfrey Show where she performed "When You Believe" with Mariah Carey and "I Learned from the Best". On December 7, she appeared at the 9th annual Billboard Music Awards where she performed "Heartbreak Hotel" with Evans and Price. Three days later (December 10), Houston performed "My Love Is Your Love", with Wyclef Jean on Late Show with David Letterman. A day later (December 11), the same song along with "Heartbreak Hotel" and "I Learned From the Best" was performed at the Rockefeller Center in New York City for an appearance on Today. On December 13, to promote the animated film, The Prince of Egypt, Houston and Carey co-hosted a television special of the film and premiered a second music video performance of the song together.

Houston performed "Until You Come Back" and "My Love Is Your Love" at the 26th American Music Awards (January 11, 1999). Two days later (January 13), she performed "I Learned From the Best" on The Tonight Show with Jay Leno.

Throughout February 1999, Houston went on a European promotional tour where in many European countries, "It's Not Right but It's Okay" was heavily focused on and promoted. She performed the song on several European TV programs including the Dutch TV show, The Surprise Show (February 8), the Italian TV show, C'era Un Ragazzo (February 10), the Spanish TV show, Sorpresa, Sorpresa (February 13), the Brit Awards in London (February 16) in what would be helmed an acclaimed performance, the Swedish TV4 TV show, Sen kväll med Luuk (February 18), the British music show, Top of the Pops (February 19) and the German TV show, Wetten Dass (February 20). Additionally on Top of the Pops, which was held at Elstree Studios, Houston also performed "My Love Is Your Love" and "I Learned From the Best". After returning to the United States to attend the 41st Grammy Awards, Houston performed "Heartbreak Hotel" on the French TF1 TV show, Les Annees Tube.

On March 21, Houston performed "When You Believe" with Mariah Carey at the 71st Academy Awards. Five days later, after a brief instrumental of "Get It Back" and an appearance by Funkmaster Flex, Houston performed "It's Not Right but It's Okay" at the 1999 Soul Train Music Awards. On April 13, Houston headlined the VH1 Divas Live '99 concert at the Beacon Theatre in New York City alongside other legends Tina Turner and Cher. During her appearance, she performed "It's Not Right but It's Okay" and "My Love Is Your Love", the latter featuring daughter Bobbi Kristina Brown and Treach, of the hip-hop group, Naughty by Nature. On her June 21st appearance on the Oprah Winfrey Show, Houston performed "It's Not Right but It's Okay" and "My Love Is Your Love".

Houston embarked on the My Love Is Your Love World Tour, which launched at the Arie Crown Theatre in Chicago for a two-date run on June 22 and 23, 1999. When asked why after her last world tour had her performing at large-seated arenas and stadiums did she decide to perform at theaters and smaller capacity venues during the North American leg of the tour, Houston explained that she turned down arena dates to do the theater performances to "do something where people can feel [her] and [she] can feel them." Due to this, Houston and her band were allowed to have a "jam-session" atmosphere. For most of Houston's North American dates, the singer performed two dates of the same venue.

For this tour, Houston hired fashion designers Dolce & Gabbana to give her edgier outfits for the show, which was a stark contrast from her more elegant outfits of previous tours. The singer previewed the wardrobe while appearing on the Oprah Winfrey Show. During the US portion of the tour, Houston gained notoriety for canceling several dates of the tour with Houston pulling out either due to vocal issues or from exhaustion, including two dates at Newark's Prudential Center. A cancellation of a show at San Francisco's Concord Pavilion happened 15 minutes before the show, to which Houston was sued for $100,000 in compensation. Though reports of strange and erratic behavior and rumors of her drug use hit the tabloids, Houston would claim throat ailments were the cause of the cancellations. Despite the controversy, however, the North American leg of the tour was successful. Charging $150 a ticket, the highest of a Houston concert tour at the time, the tour made Houston one of the few artists to break the $100-per ticket barrier.

On June 27, Houston made a surprise appearance at the 13th Annual New York City Lesbian and Gay Pride Dance in New York City, performing the popular remixes of her hits "Heartbreak Hotel" and "It's Not Right but It's Okay". The performance would mark one of the first times a major pop musician made unannounced appearances and performances at LGBTQ events and helped to make such performances commonplace.

Houston's European leg of the tour would prove to be even more successful, however. Unlike in North America, all of Houston's European concerts were held at arenas and stadiums. Houston would end up with the highest-grossing arena tour in Europe that year, performing to half a million people. Due to high demand, the tour was extended to November.

While in Germany, most of the singer's concerts there were filmed for a documentary of the tour, titled Whitney: Close Up. Close Up was originally set to be aired as a TV special in early 2000 following the release of Whitney: The Greatest Hits, but did not air at the time. Some footage from Close Up was also used in the documentary Whitney: Can I Be Me. A similar but different documentary, also titled Close Up was broadcast on February 11, 2018, on the German TV channel ServusTV.

== Singles ==
"When You Believe" was released as the lead single off the album on October 28, 1998. After debuting at number 50 on the Billboard Hot 100 on radio airplay alone, the song peaked at number fifteen, surprising many who thought the song would be a bigger hit. Its modest peak at 33 on the Hot R&B Singles & Tracks chart was the lowest peak to date for both artists at the time.

The duet was a huge global hit, reaching the top five in the UK, Belgium, France, Italy, Netherlands, Norway, Spain, Sweden, Switzerland, and the top ten in Austria, Denmark, Finland, Germany, Ireland, and New Zealand. Thanks to popularity for the song across Europe, it eventually peaked at number two on the Eurochart Hot 100. It sold 260,000 copies sold in the UK at the end of 1999.

The second single, "Heartbreak Hotel", a collaboration between Faith Evans and Kelly Price, was officially released on December 15, 1998. Entering the Billboard Hot 100 at number 84 on December 26, after a commercial single was released, the song leaped to number 29, before peaking at number two six weeks later on March 27, making it Houston's first single to peak in the runner-up spot and was her biggest chart hit since "Exhale (Shoop Shoop)" debuted at number one on the chart in November 1995. On the revamped Hot R&B Singles & Tracks chart, it debuted at number twenty three on January 9, 1999. In its first week of retail release, it shot up to number six and then climbed to number one the following week on February 13, where it would stay for seven consecutive weeks, her third longest tenure after "I Will Always Love You" and "Exhale (Shoop Shoop)". It would also become one of Houston's longest charting songs to date on the chart for 28 weeks. The single sold over 1.4 million copies in the U.S. alone, becoming the third-best-selling single of 1999, and was certified Platinum by the RIAA on March 2, 1999.

"It's Not Right but It's Okay" became its third single, released on February 15, 1999. Prior to its North American release in May 1999, the song was the b-side of the "Heartbreak Hotel" maxi-single and, as a result, charted on several Billboard Hot 100 and R&B airplay and sales charts. It debuted on the Hot R&B singles chart at number 64 on January 9, 1999. In its 24th week, the song reached its peak position of number seven. The song made its Billboard Hot 100 debut at number 87 on May 8, 1999. After its retail single was released, the song eventually peaked at number four on the chart on July 3, selling 522,000 units in the country alone. It was certified gold in the US on June 29.

The song became another global hit, reaching number three in the UK, becoming her twelfth top ten single there, and sold over 510,000 units, becoming the 25th best-selling song of the year in the region. The song made history in Canada by charting in the top five simultaneously on their official chart in August 1999, with the regular single reaching number three and the import single peaking at number five. Houston's promotion of the song in Europe helped to successfully reach several European charts, including Spain, where it reached number one. It would reach the top 20 in Austria, Germany, Netherlands, Switzerland, and Sweden. Due to its strong sales and chart success all over the European continent, it peaked at number nine on the Eurochart Hot 100.

The title track, "My Love Is Your Love" was the fourth single from the album, released on May 31, 1999. It was a massive hit worldwide, becoming another signature song for Whitney. The single was released in each European country around June 1999, prior to the United States. Upon release, the song was popular immediately across the continent, and became a bigger hit during the European leg of her My Love Is Your Love World Tour. In the UK, it peaked at number two on July 3. The single sold 525,000 copies there, becoming the twenty-second best-selling single of 1999. In Germany, it peaked at number two and was certified Platinum for shipments of 500,000 copies by the Bundesverband Musikindustrie (BVMI). It also reached number two in other countries such as Austria, Ireland, the Netherlands, Sweden, and Switzerland. In addition, it peaked inside the top ten in Belgium, Denmark, France, and Norway. Eventually the single topped the Eurochart Hot 100 for a week, becoming her fourth number one single, and was positioned at number six in the Eurochart top singles list of 1999. In New Zealand, it peaked at number one for a week, becoming Houston's third number-one single after 1987's "I Wanna Dance with Somebody (Who Loves Me)" and 1992's "I Will Always Love You".

Likewise, it was a hit in the United States. The song debuted at number eighty-one on the Billboard Hot 100 chart in September 1999 and peaked at number four in January 2000, becoming her 22nd top ten hit. In addition, it reached the number two position on the R&B singles chart, spending a total of thirty weeks on the chart, becoming her longest charting single there. The single sold 1,100,000 copies and was certified Platinum by the RIAA on December 14, 1999. Worldwide it sold over 5 million copies and became her third-best-selling single ever, behind "I Will Always Love You" and "I Wanna Dance with Somebody (Who Loves Me)".

"I Learned from the Best" became the fifth and final single to be released from the album on November 15, 1999. The song debuted at number 83 on the Hot 100 and peaked at number 27. It reached number 13 on the R&B chart. According to SoundScan, the single sold 352,000 units in the US alone. Outside the US, it reached the top 40 in the Netherlands, Sweden, and Switzerland., number 19 in the UK with 95,000 units sold, number 6 in Finland number 8 in Spain, and hit the top spot in both Romania and Poland.

In the United States, all of the singles reached the top 40 of the Billboard Hot 100, the most singles off a Houston album to reach the top 40 since Whitney (1987) produced five top ten singles in 1987-88. It was also the fifth of Houston's albums to produce three or more top ten singles. Four of the songs peaked in the top twenty and three peaked inside the top five. Nearly four million combined units were sold of the singles in the US.

The same results were produced in the United Kingdom, resulting in a combined total of 1.09 million units, making Houston the eighth best-selling singles artist of 1999. The singles also achieved success in other countries such as Canada, Germany, Sweden, Switzerland, Spain, Romania and Poland among other countries.

For the duration of the album's tenure, many of its singles were promoted with house and dance remixes, outside of "When You Believe", finding success on the Billboard Dance Club Play chart. Houston became one of the few artists to produce four consecutive number one dance singles off a single album, first reaching number one in February 1999 with the Thunderpuss remix of "It's Not Right but It's Okay", which became one of her longest running number-ones at three weeks, then topping the chart again for a week with the Hex Hector remix of "Heartbreak Hotel", later in the year with "My Love Is Your Love" for two weeks, and finally the Junior Vasquez mix of "I Learned From the Best" for three weeks.

Houston also topped the Billboard Dance Music/Maxi-Singles Sales chart twice with "My Love Is Your Love" topping for two weeks and "I Learned From the Best" topping for a single week. The two other maxi singles, "Heartbreak Hotel"/"It's Not Right but It's Okay" and "It's Not Right but It's Okay"/"I Will Always Love You" each reached number two. The remixes were sometimes played on the radio more than the original versions of the songs, as was the case for "It's Not Right but It's Okay", which has since been held as one of the greatest dance songs of all time by many retrospective reviewers and critics.

== Critical reception ==
Professional ratings
Review scores
Source	Rating
AllMusic	4/5 stars
The Baltimore Sun	3/5 stars
Entertainment Weekly	B+
Los Angeles Times	3/4 stars
Q	3/5 stars
Rolling Stone	3.5/5 stars
The Rolling Stone Album Guide	4/5 stars
TIME	2.5/4 stars
USA Today	3.5/4 stars

Upon the album's debut, the album received positive responses from music critics, and arguably the strongest reviews of her career to that point. Rob Sheffield of Rolling Stone magazine commented that "It's easily her most consistent album ever—in fact, it's her first consistent album", and praised her mature voice as follows:

The former ingenue has some grown-up scars now, singing the marital blues with a bite in her voice that she's never come close to before. Did you think she'd crumble? Did you think she'd lay down and die? Then check out My Love, pal, and hear Houston prove beyond a doubt that she will survive.

— Rolling Stone

Jon Pareles, in his review for the New York Times, praised her fully developed voice, too. He stated that her sound was "supple and devout", comparing Carey's fidgetting sound with every phrase in "When You Believe", and commented "Ms. Houston used to be similarly showy and disjointed, but now her improvisations bring emotional coherence to technical feats." With expressing his interest about any connections between her troubled marriage and her new materials, commented "Lest anyone draw other conclusions from the songs, the album carries a disclaimer." Also, he was almost positive about songs such as "It's Not Right But It's Okay", "Heartbreak Hotel" and "My Love Is Your Love". In Billboard magazine's review, the issue dated November 28, 1999, the magazine called the album "A tour de force that showcases her strengths in a wide array of musical genres from pop to R&B to gospel to dance." The publication also opined: "On an album with writing and production input from a diverse roster of players, Houston keeps it all together with her spectacular voice and singular artistic persona", declaring the album had "immense crossover potential"

Mark Bautz of Entertainment Weekly gave the album B+, calling My Love Is Your Love "A schizophrenic album" and "A primer on today's hip-hop/R&B scene: the good, the bad." by reason of the unevenness of the album. He commented "Wyclef Jean's gorgeous reggae-tinged title song and three funky cuts by Rodney Jerkins showcase the 35-year-old Whitney Houston in all her creative, soulful maturity. In contrast, a trio of schmaltzy Babyface-produced tunes expose her as merely a gifted interpreter of bland radio-ready fare.". Similarly, TIME praised some new songs, calling the title song "superb" and Houston's remake of Stevie Wonder's classic "fabulous", but criticized the old-fashioned songs of the album sharply, commenting "The problem is with the Old Guard: producer David Foster's work is dull, and Dianne Warren and Babyface, who both wrote tracks, have better work on their respective resumes."

Writing for USA Today in November 1998, Steve Jones made a favorable comment on almost every song whether it is a ballad with her formula for success or a new styled song produced by hot, young producers who've updated and diversified her sound, stating "There's something here for just about everybody, whether you favor R&B, pop or adult contemporary radio." But he chose the remake "I Was Made To Love Him" as the best track of the album, complimenting the song highly, "The rollicking, gender-flipping remake". Stephen Thomas Erlewine from Allmusic, who gave the album four out of five stars, called it "easily ranks among her best" and complimented the musical diversity "Houston has never been quite so subtle before, nor has she ever shown this desire to branch out musically." But he also wasn't positive for adult contemporary ballads of the album, stating "In fact, the songs that feel the stiffest are the big production numbers; tellingly, they're the songs that are the most reminiscent of old-school Houston." Los Angeles Times gave it three out of four stars, writing "[It] reflect her growth as an artist and as an individual."

== Commercial performance ==
Worldwide, the album's release was not preceded by that of any commercial singles, which initially resulted in it underperforming commercially. In the United States, My Love Is Your Love was released on November 17, 1998, when major records were released simultaneously for the holidays by high-profile musicians like Garth Brooks, Mariah Carey, Celine Dion, Jewel, Method Man, The Offspring and Seal besides her. Time magazine wrote, "Music-industry folks have dubbed it Super Tuesday because more than ten major pop acts issued new CDs on the single day, making it the heaviest release date ever." The week of December 5, 1998, the album entered the US Billboard 200 chart at number thirteen, which was the peak position of the album, and her lowest chart position at that point in time, with sales of 123,000 copies in its first week. That result was disappointing initially because the release was Houston's first non-soundtrack album in eight years and was highly anticipated. But eventually, the album became a commercial success, thanks to a series of hit singles, her energetic promotions and a successful world tour. My Love Is Your Love was present on the Billboard 200 chart for over a year, at 75 weeks, and on Billboard Top R&B/Hip-Hop Albums chart for 79 weeks, peaking at number seven. The Recording Industry Association of America (RIAA) certified the album four-times platinum on November 1, 1999, for shipments of four million copies. According to the Nielson SoundScan, the album has sold 2,753,000 copies.

Across Europe, it was more successful than in the United States. In early times of its release, the commercial response for the album was short of expectations, but its sales rose sharply during the European leg of the My Love Is Your Love World Tour, which was the highest grossing arena concert tour of 1999 on the continent, and consequently My Love Is Your Love became the second best-selling album of 1999 in Europe, behind Cher's Believe, spending more than one year on the charts in many countries. In the United Kingdom, it reached number four on the albums chart and was certified 3× Platinum for shipments of 900,000 copies of the album by the British Phonographic Industry (BPI). In France, the album peaked at number two on the albums chart, and was certified 2× platinum by the Syndicat National de l'Édition Phonographique (SNEP). In Germany, it climbed to the number two on the albums chart on its 35th week and has sold more than 670,000 copies. The album reached number one on the albums charts in Austria, Switzerland and Netherlands, and the top five in Belgium, Denmark, Norway and Finland. My Love Is Your Love was certified 4× platinum by the International Federation of the Phonographic Industry (IFPI) for shipments of four million copies of the album in Europe. As of May 2000, the album sold over 10 million copies worldwide.

== Accolades ==
Much like her previous albums, Houston received many awards and nominations from her work on the album. At the 71st Academy Awards, "When You Believe", her duet with Mariah Carey from The Prince of Egypt won the Academy Award for Best Original Song, which went to writer Stephen Schwartz, who wasn't present for the award. It was the third Academy Award-nominated song Houston performed on, after "Run to You" and "I Have Nothing", from The Bodyguard. The same song received two nominations at the American Latino Media Arts (ALMA) Awards, including Outstanding Performance of a Song for a Feature Film and Outstanding Music Video, mainly due to Carey's Latino (Venezuelan) heritage. The same song was nominated for Best Original Song at the 56th Golden Globe Awards.

Houston received three nominations for the album at the 2000 American Music Awards, including her seventh career nomination for Favorite Pop/Rock Female Artist, her seventh career nomination for Favorite Soul/R&B Female Artist and a career fourth nomination for Favorite Soul/R&B Album.

At the Bambi Verleihung (or Bambi Awards) in Germany, Houston received the Pop International Award for her work on the album as well as her entire two-decade career.

At the 1999 Billboard Music Awards, Houston received three nominations, including Hot 100 Female Artist of the Year while her hit "Heartbreak Hotel" was nominated in the Hot 100 Single and Hot R&B Single of the Year categories. In 1999 and 2000, Houston received four nominations at the Blockbuster Entertainment Awards including two nominations for Favorite R&B Female Artist and two nominations for "Heartbreak Hotel" and "When You Believe". Three of the songs on the album - "Heartbreak Hotel", "It's Not Right but It's Okay" and "My Love Is Your Love" - won awards for the songwriters at the 2000 BMI Pop Awards. While Babyface received a BMI Pop Award for "When You Believe" at the 2001 ceremony. At the 2000 Brit Awards in London received her sixth nomination for Best International Female Artist.

At the 42nd Annual Grammy Awards in 2000, Houston received four nominations for the album, including Best R&B Album, winning one for Best Female R&B Vocal Performance for "It's Not Right but It's Okay". It was her first win in the category after six previous nominations, dating back to the 1986 ceremony. Houston joined cousin Dionne Warwick and Toni Braxton as only the third artist to win in both R&B and pop categories. In addition, both "It's Not Right but It's Okay" and "Heartbreak Hotel" were each nominated in the Best R&B Song category while "When You Believe" was nominated for the Grammy for Best Song Written for a Motion Picture, Television or Other Visual Media.

Houston was nominated in the category of Best International Act at the 1999 MOBO (Music of Black Origin Awards) Awards in London, losing to album collaborator Lauryn Hill.

At the 1999 MTV Video Music Awards, Houston received her first nomination in over a decade since the 1986 ceremony, with "Heartbreak Hotel" receiving a nomination for Best R&B Video. At the 1999 MTV Europe Music Awards, Houston received two nominations, winning one for Best R&B.

At the 1999 and 2000 NAACP Image Awards, Houston received seven nominations, winning two with "When You Believe" receiving the award for Outstanding Duo or Group and her work on "Heartbreak Hotel" resulted in her winning the award for Outstanding Female Artist in the respective years while the album itself was nominated for Outstanding Album. At the NRJ Awards in France, Houston received two nominations, winning one for Album international de l'année (International Album of the Year).

At the Lady of Soul Awards, Houston received two nominations while at the 2000 Soul Train Music Awards, Houston received two competitive nominations for the album. At the same ceremony, Houston received the Female Artist of the Decade honor. In November 1999, Houston received a special honor from the Recording Industry Association of America, receiving the Century Award for being the best selling R&B female artist of the 20th century.

== Track listing ==
No.	Title	Writer(s)	Length
1.	"It's Not Right but It's Okay"	Rodney Jerkins; Fred Jerkins III; LaShawn Daniels; Isaac Phillips; Toni Estes	4:52
2.	"Heartbreak Hotel" (featuring Faith Evans and Kelly Price)	Kenneth Karlin; Tamara Savage; Carsten Schack	4:41
3.	"My Love Is Your Love"	Wyclef Jean; Jerry "Wonder" Duplessis	4:21
4.	"When You Believe (from The Prince of Egypt)" (duet with Mariah Carey)	Stephen Schwartz; Babyface (add.)	4:32
5.	"If I Told You That"	R. Jerkins; F. Jerkins; Daniels; Estes	4:37
6.	"In My Business" (featuring Missy "Misdemeanor" Elliott)	Elliott; Kelvin "K.B." Bradshaw; Lloyd "Spec" Turner	3:27
7.	"I Learned from the Best"	Diane Warren	4:19
8.	"Oh Yes"	Elliott; Bradshaw; Turner	6:47
9.	"Get It Back"	R. Jerkins; F. Jerkins; Daniels; Estes	4:53
10.	"Until You Come Back"	Babyface; Daryl Simmons	4:52
11.	"I Bow Out"	Warren	4:31
12.	"You'll Never Stand Alone"	Warren	4:21
13.	"I Was Made to Love Him" (hidden track)	Henry Cosby; Lula Mae Hardaway; Sylvia Moy; Stevie Wonder	4:26

The Club Remix – limited bonus disc
No.	Title	Writer(s)	Producer(s)	Length
1.	"It's Not Right But It's Okay" (Thunderpuss 2000 Club Mix)	R. Jerkins; F. Jerkins; Daniels; Phillips; Estes	R. Jerkins; Thunderpuss^{[a]}	9:15
2.	"My Love Is Your Love" (Wyclef Remix)	Jean; Duplessis	Jean; Duplessis	4:10
3.	"Heartbreak Hotel" (Hex Hector Radio Mix)	Karlin; Savage; Schack	Soulshock and Karlin; Hex Hector^{[a]}	4:20
4.	"It's Not Right But It's Okay" (Johnny Vicious Radio Mix)	R. Jerkins; F. Jerkins; Daniels; Phillips; Estes	R. Jerkins; Johnny Vicious^{[a]}	4:14
5.	"My Love Is Your Love" (Jonathan Peters' Tight Mix)	Jean; Duplessis	Jean; Duplessis; Jonathan Peters^{[a]}	8:23

Notes

- ^{^a} denotes additional producer

== Personnel ==
Adapted from AllMusic.

- Whitney Houston – primary artist, producer, vocal arranger, vocals, background vocals
- Babyface – composer, drum programming, guest artist, keyboards, producer, programming, background vocals
- Jerry Barnes – bass
- Sherrod Barnes – guitar
- Ali Boudris – acoustic guitar
- Corrado Sgandurra – guitar
- Paul Boutin – engineer
- Tim Boyle – engineer
- Kelvin Bradshaw – composer
- Mariah Carey – guest artist
- Sue Ann Carwell – background vocals
- Beverly Crowder – background vocals
- LaShawn Daniels – composer
- Loren Dawson – strings
- Jerry "Wonda" Duplessis – producer
- Nathan East – bass
- Felipe Elgueta – engineer
- Missy Elliott – guest artist, featured artist, producer, vocals
- Toni Estes – background vocals
- Faith Evans – featured artist, guest artist
- Paul J. Falcone – engineer, mixing
- David Foster – arranger, guest artist, keyboards, producer
- Jon Gass – mixing
- Humberto Gatica – engineer
- Sharlotte Gibson – background vocals
- Brad Gilderman – engineer, mixing
- Gavin Greenaway – conductor
- Mick Guzauski – mixing
- Wyclef Jean – composer, producer
- Rodney Jerkins – composer, drum programming, keyboards, producer, strings
- Kenneth Karlin – composer, arranger, producer
- Larry Kimpel – bass
- Ricky Lawson – drums
- Manny Marroquin – engineer, mixing
- Bill Meyers – conductor
- Don Murray – engineer
- Kevin Parker – engineer
- Greg Phillinganes – piano
- Isaac Phillips – composer
- Kelly Price – featured artist, guest artist
- Eric Rigler – pipe
- William Ross – arranger, conductor
- Tamara Savage – composer
- Carsten Schack – composer
- Stephen Schwartz – composer
- Sheila E. – guest artist, percussion
- Daryl Simmons – composer
- John Smeltz – engineer
- V. Jeffrey Smith – flute
- Soulshock – arranger, mixing, producer
- Michael Thompson – guitar
- Ryan Toby – vocals
- Lloyd Turner – composer
- Tommy Vicari – engineer
- Diane Warren – composer
- Shanice Wilson – background vocals
- James Burris – Choir: Eric Cherry's Family And Friends-background vocals
- Hans Zimmer – arranger

== Charts ==
=== Weekly charts ===
1998–2000 weekly chart performance for My Love Is Your Love
Chart (1998–2000)	Peak position
Australian Albums (ARIA)	42
Austrian Albums (Ö3 Austria)	1
Belgian Albums (Ultratop Flanders)	2
Belgian Albums (Ultratop Wallonia)	3
Canada Top Albums/CDs (RPM)	13
Czech Republic Albums (IFPI)	17
Danish Albums (IFPI Danmark)	3
Dutch Albums (Album Top 100)	1
European Top 100 Albums (Music & Media)	1
Finnish Albums (Suomen virallinen lista)	5
French Albums (SNEP)	2
German Albums (Offizielle Top 100)	2
Greek Albums (IFPI Greece)	6
Hungarian Albums (MAHASZ)	18
Icelandic Albums (Tónlist)	5
Irish Albums (IRMA)	10
Italian Albums (Musica e dischi)	8
Japanese Albums (Dempa)	11
Malaysian Albums (RIM)	5
New Zealand Albums (RMNZ)	12
Norwegian Albums (VG-lista)	3
Scottish Albums (Official Charts)	19
Spanish Albums (PROMUSICAE)	12
Swedish Albums (Sverigetopplistan)	7
Swiss Albums (Schweizer Hitparade)	1
Taiwanese International Albums (IFPI)	1
UK Albums (Official Charts)	4
UK R&B Albums (Official Charts)	1
US Billboard 200	13
US Top R&B/Hip-Hop Albums (Billboard)	7

2012 weekly chart performance for My Love Is Your Love
Chart (2012)	Peak position
UK Album Downloads (Official Charts)	74
UK R&B Albums (Official Charts)	28
US Billboard 200	30

2023 weekly chart performance for My Love Is Your Love
Chart (2023)	Peak position
German Albums (Offizielle Top 100)	98
Scottish Albums (Official Charts)	92
Spanish Vinyl Albums (PROMUSICAE)	23
UK R&B Albums (Official Charts)	3

=== Year-end charts ===
1998 year-end chart performance for My Love Is Your Love
Chart (1998)	Position
Canadian Albums (SoundScan)	171
Canadian R&B Albums (SoundScan)	26
French Albums (SNEP)	74

1999 year-end chart performance for My Love Is Your Love
Chart (1999)	Position
Austrian Albums (Ö3 Austria)	2
Belgian Albums (Ultratop Flanders)	11
Belgian Albums (Ultratop Wallonia)	24
Dutch Albums (Album Top 100)	15
European Top 100 Albums (Music & Media)	4
French Albums (SNEP)	12
German Albums (Offizielle Top 100)	3
Swedish Albums (Sverigetopplistan)	33
Swiss Albums (Schweizer Hitparade)	8
UK Albums (OCC)	15
US Billboard 200	30
US Top R&B/Hip-Hop Albums (Billboard)	12

2000 year-end chart performance for My Love Is Your Love
Chart (2000)	Position
Finnish Albums (Suomen virallinen lista)	124
US Billboard 200	184

=== Decade-end charts ===
1990–1999 decade-end chart performance for My Love Is Your Love
Chart (1990–1999)	Position
Austrian Albums (Ö3 Austria)	25

== Certifications and sales ==
Region	Certification	Certified units/sales
Australia (ARIA)	Gold	35,000^{^}
Austria (IFPI Austria)	Platinum	50,000^{*}
Belgium (BRMA)	Platinum	50,000^{*}
Canada (Music Canada)	2× Platinum	200,000^{^}
Finland (Musiikkituottajat)	Gold	24,548
France (SNEP)	2× Platinum	600,000^{*}
Germany	—	670,000
Japan (RIAJ)	Platinum	200,000^{^}
Netherlands (NVPI)	Platinum	100,000^{^}
New Zealand (RMNZ)	Gold	7,500^{^}
Poland (ZPAV)	Platinum	100,000^{*}
Spain (Promusicae)	Platinum	100,000^{^}
Sweden (GLF)	2× Platinum	160,000^{^}
Switzerland (IFPI Switzerland)	3× Platinum	150,000^{^}
United Kingdom (BPI)	3× Platinum	900,000^{^}
United States (RIAA)	4× Platinum	2,753,000
Summaries
Europe (IFPI)	4× Platinum	4,000,000^{*}
Worldwide	—	10,000,000
^{*} Sales figures based on certification alone.^{^} Shipments figures based on certification alone.

== See also ==
- List of best-selling albums by women
