= Heartbreak Hotel (Whitney Houston song) =

1998 single by Whitney Houston featuring Faith Evans and Kelly Price

- Artwork for US, Japanese and Australian editions

Single by Whitney Houston featuring Faith Evans and Kelly Price

from the album My Love Is Your Love
- B-side: "It's Not Right but It's Okay"
- Released: December 15, 1998
- Recorded: September 1998
- Studio: Crossway (Mendham, New Jersey); Soulpower (Los Angeles)
- Genre: R&B
- Length: 4:40 (single and album version); 4:03 (radio and video version)
- Label: Arista
- Songwriters: Carsten Schack; Kenneth Karlin; Tamara Savage
- Producer: Soulshock & Karlin

Whitney Houston singles chronology
"When You Believe" (1998)	"Heartbreak Hotel" (1998)	"It's Not Right but It's Okay" (1999)

Faith Evans singles chronology
"Love Like This" (1998)	"Heartbreak Hotel" (1998)	"Georgy Porgy" (1999)

Music video
- "Heartbreak Hotel" on YouTube

"Heartbreak Hotel" is a song recorded by American singer Whitney Houston. Written by Carsten Schack, Kenneth Karlin and Tamara Savage, and produced by Soulshock & Karlin, it was released on December 15, 1998, by Arista Records as the second single from Houston's 1998 album My Love Is Your Love. The song prominently features R&B singers Faith Evans and Kelly Price during the choruses and bridge.

The song was initially written for inclusion on TLC's third studio album FanMail, it was later recorded by Houston after TLC rejected the song.

An immediate hit in the United States, the song reached number two on the Billboard Hot 100 and number one on Billboard's Hot R&B Singles & Tracks chart on in early 1999. "Heartbreak Hotel" was certified double platinum by the Recording Industry Association of America (RIAA). It was also a hit in several countries worldwide. The song received two nominations at the 42nd Annual Grammy Awards for Best R&B Song and Best R&B Performance by a Duo or Group with Vocal.

The video, directed by Kevin Bray, was nominated for Best R&B Video at the 1999 MTV Video Music Awards. In 2019, the song was listed as one of the 50 best songs of the 1990s by Rolling Stone.

== Background ==
By August 1998, it had been eight years since Whitney Houston had released a studio album. Following her ascent to movie stardom after the success of The Bodyguard and her successful soundtrack from the film, Houston had gone on to act and co-star in three films, including two feature films and a television film. This prompted her longtime mentor and record label boss Clive Davis to write a letter in which he asked the singer when she was going to return to the studio to record a brand new non-soundtrack album.

After recording the Mariah Carey-featured duet, "When You Believe", for the Prince of Egypt soundtrack that August, Houston began work on a full-length studio album after she began working on songs with Rodney Jerkins. Around this time, the production team of Soulshock & Karlin had sent an R&B ballad called "Heartbreak Hotel" to the group TLC for their upcoming album, FanMail. Much to their disappointment, however, the group turned the song down. (Note: TLC group member Left Eye reportedly complained about the group turning down the song.) Upon hearing that TLC had rejected the ballad, Davis insisted on Houston recording the song as a duet with two rising R&B artists Faith Evans and Kelly Price.

== Music and composition ==
"Heartbreak Hotel" is an R&B song with elements of hip-hop soul written in the key of G♭ major with a tempo of "slowly" at 67 beats per minute in common time. The chords in the song alternate between E♭m7 and A♭m7, and the vocals in the song span from G♭_{3} to A♭_{5}.

The recording of the song took place at two studios: Houston's own Crossway recording studio at her Mendham property and Soulpower Studios in Los Angeles. The producers and Houston initially struggled with the vocal arrangement, which Soulshock admitted was "complicated", until after Davis demanded them to give them a version where he was "blown away by [Houston's] vocals"; Houston nailed the vocal on the third take. The producers initially wrote the brief rap, "this is the heart-break ho-tel", for Houston's husband, singer Bobby Brown, to record. Reportedly, when Davis heard Brown in the song's playback, he ordered the producers to remove Brown's vocals. Houston eventually recorded the rap herself and the producers "looped" it so Brown's mix would be unheard.

== Critical reception ==
Billboard magazine reviewed the song very favorably while reviewing the My Love Is Your Love album saying, "[It's] a highly effective setting for Houston, who wears her emotions on her sleeve and serves up one of the most effective performances on the album. Price and Evans sell themselves grandly as empathetic sisters alongside their pained friend, soaring with emotion and helping keep the timeless artist identifiable to a new generation of R&B fans. Of course, R&B radio will give this a hug in an instant."

NME also reviewed the song positively: "Although the appeal of this oddly-paced mid-tempo relies heavily on the 'girls united in rejection' ethos, it works because the guest vocalists appearing with Houston – Faith Evans and Kelly Price – are two enormously talented singers who have carved out careers specializing in soulful balladry. Their respective abilities to wring emotion out of the written word means that anything they sing is seen as sincere. [...] But the risk of having three individually successful singers collaborate on one track is that the song could drown in the weight of competitive vocal acrobatics. But Houston, Evans and Price are secure in their gifts[.] Confident without being cocky, emotive without being melodramatic, they've made a tidy meal of this track[.]"

== Commercial performance ==
"Heartbreak Hotel" was released as the second single released from Houston's My Love Is Your Love album, officially issued on December 15, 1998. The song entered the US Billboard Hot 100 chart at number 84 with airplay alone as there was not yet a retail single; issue date of December 26, 1998. On its first week that retail release impacted the song's chart position; it leaped from number 55 to 29, and spent three weeks at number two on the Hot 100. Additionally, the song entered the revamped Hot R&B Singles & Tracks chart at number 23 with the mark of its seventh week on the chart, the issue date of January 9, 1999. In its first week on retail release, the song reached the number six position and the following week topped the chart, unseating Monica's "Angel of Mine" from the top spot, becoming her eighth number-one single on the Hot R&B chart. The single stayed on the summit for seven consecutive weeks from February 13 to March 27, 1999, which was her third longest stay atop the Hot R&B chart behind "I Will Always Love You" for 11 weeks in 1992–1993 and "Exhale (Shoop Shoop)" for eight weeks in 1995–1996, and was on the chart for a total of 26 weeks. It placed at number four and number three, on the Billboard year-end Hot 100 Singles and Hot R&B Singles & Tracks chart, respectively. It was certified Platinum for shipments of 1,000,000 copies or more by the Recording Industry Association of America on March 2, 1999. According to Nielsen SoundScan, the single sold over 1,300,000 copies in the US alone, making it the country's third best-selling single of 1999. In June 2025, it was certified double platinum for sales of over 2 million copies.

== Music video ==
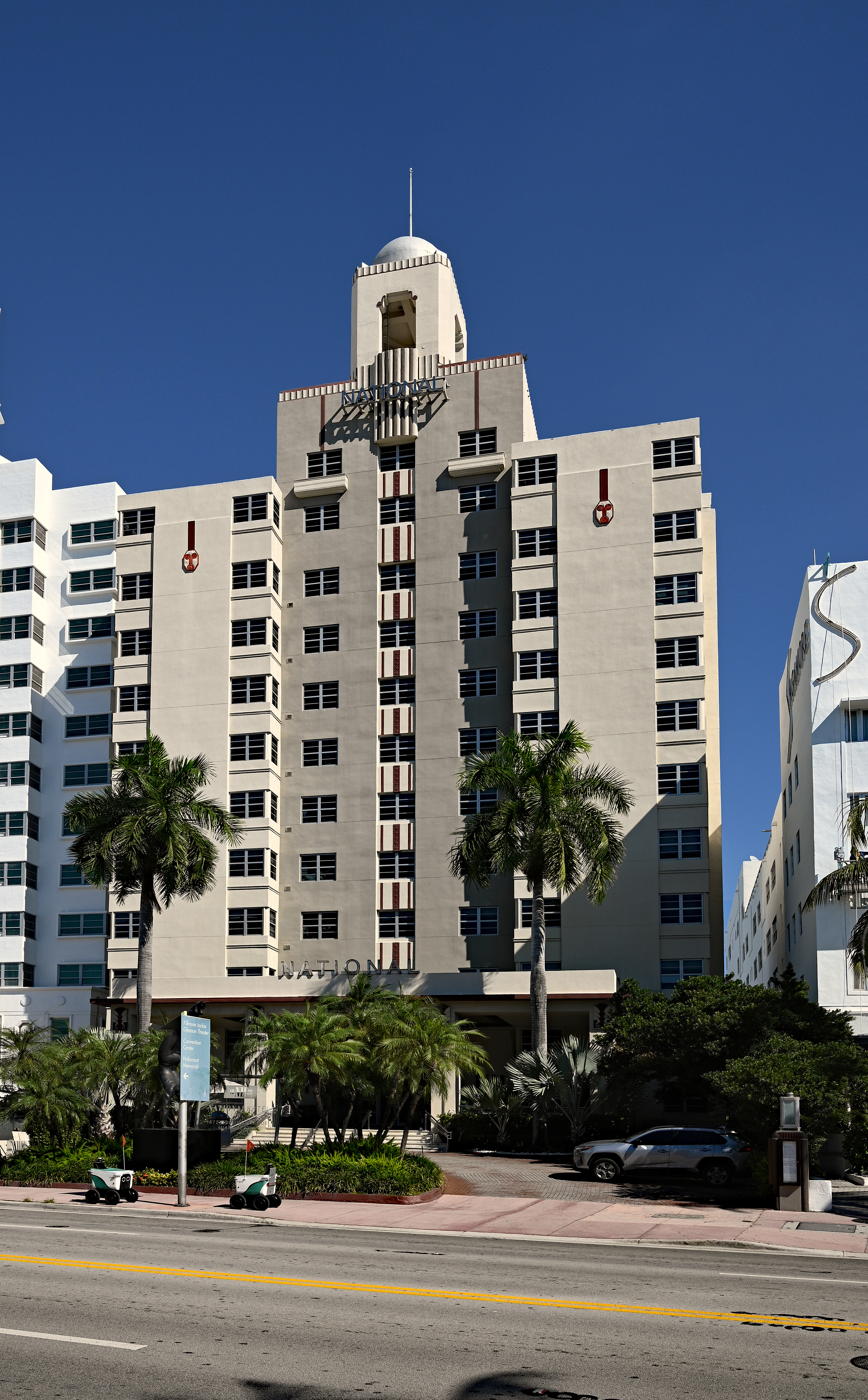
The "Heartbreak Hotel" music video was mainly shot at the National Hotel in Miami Beach.

The music video for "Heartbreak Hotel" was filmed in Miami Beach, Florida, on January 5–6, 1999, and was directed by Kevin Bray on January 5–6, 1999. The visuals were shot primarily at the National Hotel in the South Beach area of the city, with additional scenes filmed at an airport hangar.

The video's narrative follows several people at a hotel dealing with the emotional aftermath of failed relationships. Houston, Evans, and Kelly appear both together and separately throughout the hotel, with Houston ultimately finding solace in the company of the other two singers. Houston is featured in several glamour shots. In scenes filmed inside the National Hotel, she wears a blue suit beneath a white mink coat and sports a bleached-blond bob. In the outdoor scenes, she appears in a red gown with a shorter brown bob and a choker, again wearing the mink coat. One of the video's most notable moments occurs when Houston walks to the ocean and throws her coat into the water before walking away. According to Evans, the scene was unscripted, and the coat was never recovered.

The video premiered on MTV in late January 1999 and subsequently entered heavy rotation on the channel. It was also frequently featured on Total Request Live. The video was among the ten most-watched music videos on MTV during 1999 and earned Houston a nomination for Best R&B Video at the 1999 MTV Video Music Awards.

== Awards and nominations ==
"Heartbreak Hotel" was nominated for Best R&B Video at the 1999 MTV Video Music Awards. The song was also nominated for "R&B Single of the Year" at the 10th Billboard Music Awards on December 8, 1999, and for Best R&B Performance by a Duo or Group with Vocal and Best R&B Song at the 42nd Grammy Awards on February 23, 2000. Houston was honored with an NAACP Image Award for Outstanding Female Artist for the song at its 31st ceremony on April 6, 2000. It was nominated for "Favorite Single" at the 6th Blockbuster Entertainment Awards on May 9, 2000. On May 16, 2000, the song won the Broadcast Music Incorporated (BMI) Pop Award at its 48th ceremony. In 2019, the song was listed as one of the 50 best songs of the 1990s on Rolling Stone. That same year, it was ranked the 21st greatest song of 1999 on the same magazine. Spin magazine voted the song the 26th best R&B song of the 1990s. Featured on BET's list of Houston's 40 best songs, the network voted the track number twenty.

== Live performances ==
Houston first performed an edited version of "Heartbreak Hotel" live on The Rosie O'Donnell Show on November 23, 1998, appearing with Faith Evans and Kelly Price to promote My Love Is Your Love. The three women performed the song together at the 9th Billboard Music Awards on December 7, 1998. During her European promotion in February 1999, the song was performed live by Houston alone on the French television show, Les Annees Tube. On June 27 that year, Houston made a surprise appearance at the 13th Annual New York City Lesbian & Gay Pride Dance and performed a remixed version of the song along with "It's Not Right but It's Okay". Video of the performance premiered on MTV All Access on July 21, 1999.

During her My Love Is Your Love World Tour in 1999, the song was second on the tour's setlist. Houston added elements from The Jackson 5 hit "This Place Hotel" to end the song. One performance on the tour was broadcast live on Polish TV channel, TVP1, on August 22, 1999. "Heartbreak Hotel" was included in the setlist of Soul Divas Tour in 2004 and performed at Live & Loud Music Festival in Kuala Lumpur, Malaysia on December 1, 2007.

== Track listings ==
- US CD maxi-single
1. "Heartbreak Hotel" (album version) – 4:41
2. "Heartbreak Hotel" (Hex Hector radio mix) – 4:20
3. "Heartbreak Hotel" (Hex Hector club mix) – 8:44
4. "It's Not Right but It's Okay" (Thunderpuss 2000 radio mix) – 4:11
5. "It's Not Right but It's Okay" (Thunderpuss 2000 club mix) – 9:14
6. "It's Not Right but It's Okay" (Thunderpuss 2000 dub) – 8:19
7. "It's Not Right but It's Okay" (Johnny Vicious radio mix) – 4:14
8. "It's Not Right but It's Okay" (Johnny Vicious Momentous mix) – 13:03
9. "It's Not Right but It's Okay" (Johnny Vicious dub) – 8:31
- US CD single
1. "Heartbreak Hotel" (original radio mix) – 3:59
2. "Heartbreak Hotel" (dance mix) – 4:20
3. "It's Not Right but It's Okay" (dance mix) – 4:11
- US 12-inch vinyl (Remixes)

A1: "Heartbreak Hotel" (Hex Hector club mix) – 8:44
B1: "Heartbreak Hotel" (Hex Hector NYC Rough mix) – 9:14
B2: "Heartbreak Hotel" (Hex Hector radio mix) – 4:20

- UK CD maxi-single
1. "Heartbreak Hotel" (R.I.P. radio edit) – 3:42
2. "Heartbreak Hotel" (Undadoggz radio edit) – 3:39
3. "Heartbreak Hotel" (album version) – 4:41
4. "Heartbreak Hotel" (Undadoggz club rub pt.1) – 5:55
- German CD maxi-single
1. "Heartbreak Hotel" (R.I.P. radio mix) – 3:40
2. "Love to Infinity Megamix" (edit) – 5:17
3. "Heartbreak Hotel" (album version) – 4:41
4. "Heartbreak Hotel" (Undadoggz club rub pt.2) – 4:30
5. "Love to Infinity Megamix" (extended) – 9:22
- German CD maxi-single
1. "Heartbreak Hotel" (R.I.P. radio edit) – 3:42
2. "Heartbreak Hotel" (Undadoggz radio edit) – 3:39
3. "Heartbreak Hotel" (album version) – 4:38
4. "Megamix" (Love to Infinity edit) – 5:17
5. "I Will Always Love You" – 4:23
6. "Heartbreak Hotel" (music video) – 4:03
7. "Megamix" (Love to Infinity edit) (music video) – 5:17

== Charts ==
=== Weekly charts ===
Chart (1998–2000)	Peak position
Australia (ARIA)	17
Belgium (Ultratip Bubbling Under Flanders)	12
Belgium (Ultratop 50 Wallonia)	33
Canada Top Singles (RPM)	16
Canada Dance/Urban (RPM)	10
Canada (Nielsen SoundScan)	12
Canada Contemporary Hit Radio (The Record)	24
Europe (Eurochart Hot 100)	36
France (SNEP)	7
Germany (GfK)	61
Iceland (Íslenski Listinn Topp 40)	15
Netherlands (Dutch Top 40)	35
Netherlands (Single Top 100)	41
New Zealand (Recorded Music NZ) with "It's Not Right but It's Okay"	33
Quebec (ADISQ)	20
Scottish Singles Sales (Official Charts)	49
Switzerland (Schweizer Hitparade)	77
UK Singles (Official Charts)	25
UK Dance (Official Charts)	21
UK Hip Hop/R&B (Official Charts)	8
US Billboard Hot 100	2
US Dance Club Songs (Billboard)	1
US Dance Singles Sales (Billboard)	2
US Hot R&B/Hip-Hop Songs (Billboard)	1
US Pop Airplay (Billboard)	8
US Rhythmic Airplay (Billboard)	3

=== Year-end charts ===
Chart (1999)	Position
Australia (ARIA)	94
France (SNEP)	65
US Billboard Hot 100	4
US Dance Club Play (Billboard)	23
US Hot R&B/Hip-Hop Singles & Tracks (Billboard)	3
US Mainstream Top 40 (Billboard)	43
US Maxi-Singles Sales (Billboard)	8
US Rhythmic Top 40 (Billboard)	11

== Certifications ==
Region	Certification	Certified units/sales
United States (RIAA)	2× Platinum	2,000,000^{‡}
^{‡} Sales+streaming figures based on certification alone.

== Release history ==
Region	Version	Date	Format(s)	Label(s)	Ref(s).
United States	"Heartbreak Hotel"	December 15, 1998	Radio	Arista	
United States	"Heartbreak Hotel"	January 15, 1999	Commercial	Arista	
Japan	"Heartbreak Hotel" / "It's Not Right but It's Okay"	February 24, 1999	CD	Arista	
United Kingdom	"Heartbreak Hotel"	December 18, 2000	12-inch vinyl; CD; cassette	Arista; BMG	

== See also ==
- R&B number-one hits of 1999 (USA)
- Number-one dance hits of 1999 (USA)
