= List of Whitney Houston records and achievements =

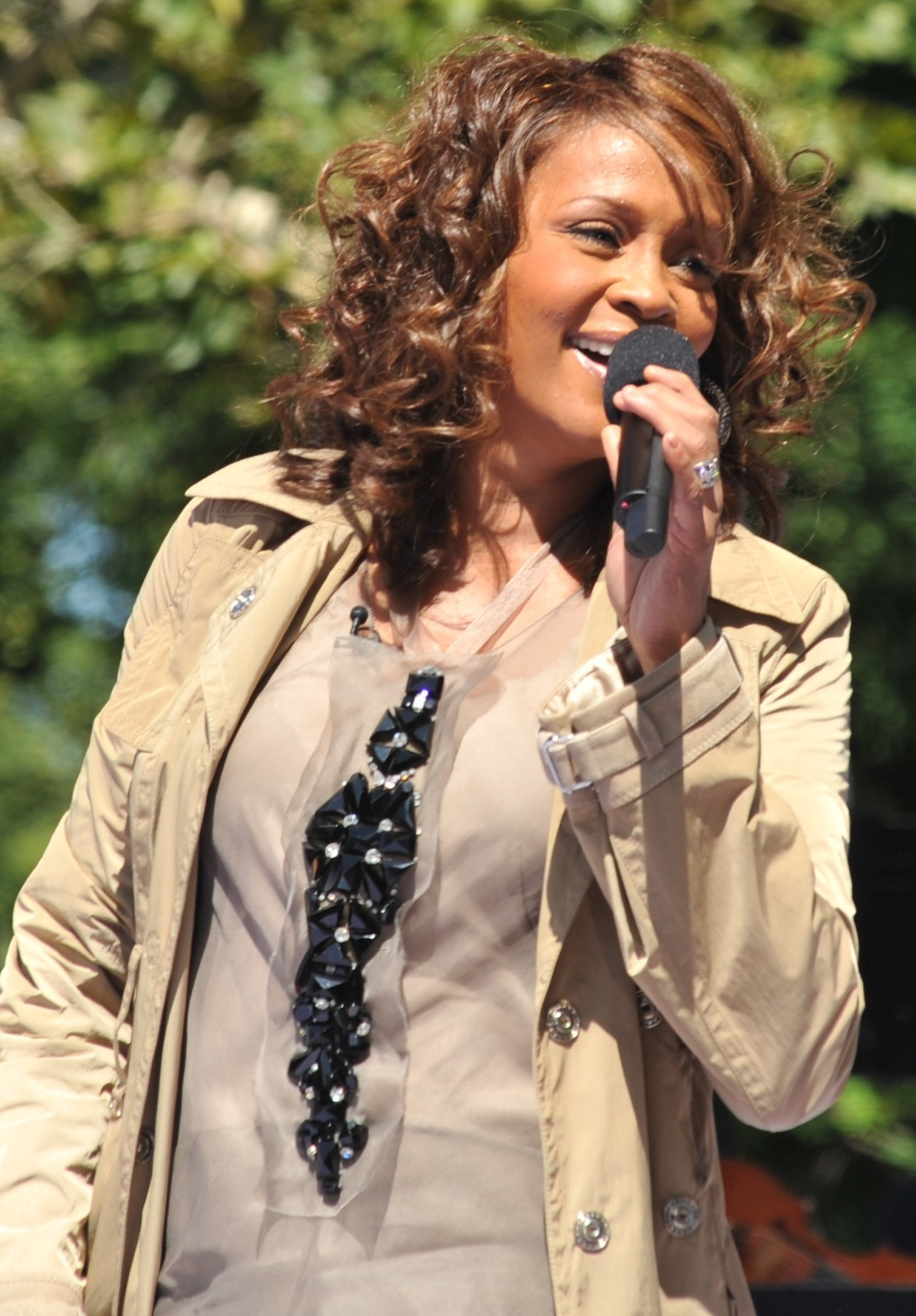
Houston in 2009

American cultural icon Whitney Houston, throughout her career spanning four decades, obtained numerous achievements, setting and breaking world records for her musical work. Known as “The Voice”, she is one of the most significant cultural figures of the 20th century. Her first appearance on the Guinness World Records was in 1987 for being the female artist with the best-selling album of all time and the best-selling debut album of all time with her album, Whitney Houston (1985). She has earned multiple appearances since, including best-selling soundtrack of all time for The Bodyguard (1992) and the biggest posthumous earnings for a female artist of 2023, among others.

Houston achieved mainstream popularity in the 1980s. Upon releasing her self-titled debut in 1985, the album went on to become the best-selling R&B studio album by a woman and the best-selling debut album by a solo act in history with sales of 25 million units worldwide. She continued to have success with her sophomore release, Whitney (1987), which made chart history as the first album by a female artist to debut at number one on the Billboard 200. Houston set an all time chart record during that era, being the first and only artist to produce seven consecutive number one singles on the Billboard Hot 100. Houston continued her popularity in the 1990s with the release of the soundtrack to the film, The Bodyguard (1992), which helped to set all kinds of chart and sales records. The Bodyguard soundtrack was the first album in the US to sell a million copies in a single week in the Nielsen SoundScan era and went on to become the best-selling soundtrack and female album in history with 45 million units sold worldwide. Her soundtrack to The Preacher's Wife (1996) sold six million units worldwide, becoming the best-selling gospel album of all time. With sales of over 220 million records worldwide, Houston is one of the best-selling artists of all time. In 1999, the RIAA ranked Houston the best-selling female R&B artist of the 20th century.

Since her career's inception in 1977, Houston has received numerous honorary awards and was named by publications, such as music trade magazines and newspapers for her commercial and cultural significance. In 1990, she earned the Howie Richmond Hitmaker Award at the Songwriters Hall of Fame. In 2012, she received the Billboard Millennium Award for her landmark chart achievements; that same year, ABC ranked her first in their 30 Greatest Women in Music list. In 2013, Houston was inducted into both the Georgia Music Hall of Fame and New Jersey Hall of Fame. In 2020, she was inducted into the Rock and Roll Hall of Fame in her first ballot, ten years after she became eligible. In 2023, she was ranked the second greatest singer of all time on Rolling Stone. In 2026, Houston received the Grammy Award for lifetime achievement. Her contributions to music earned her an honorary doctorate from Grambling State University (1988).

== Definitions ==
Key
×	Denotes record broken by another individual
+	Denotes record broken by another individual, while she holds a next category
±	Denotes record tied by another individual
◆	Included or mentioned by Guinness

== Selected global and regional records and achievements ==
Records/Achievements	Notes
Best-selling album by a woman ◆	Houston's soundtrack album, The Bodyguard (1992) from the film of the same name has held this record since 1994, and has since gone on to sell more than 45 million albums worldwide. Years earlier, Houston first held the record with her debut album, Whitney Houston.
Best-selling soundtrack ◆	Houston's soundtrack The Bodyguard (1992) from the film of the same name has held this record since 1994.
Best-selling debut album ◆	Houston's debut album, Whitney Houston (1985), first held the record for all debut albums back in the 1987 edition of the Guinness World Records until around 1999 when the rock band Boston claimed the title for their 1977 self-titled debut album.
Best-selling debut album by a woman ◆	Houston's debut album was also cited by Guinness World Records for being the best-selling debut album by a female artist at 25-30 million units worldwide.
Best-selling debut by a solo artist ◆	Houston's self-titled debut album is still cited as the best-selling debut album by a solo artist of all time.
Best-selling R&B studio album by a woman ◆	Houston's debut album, Whitney Houston, was also cited by Guinness World Records as the best-selling R&B studio album by a female artist.
Most successful musician couple ◆	In the 1999 edition of Guinness World Records, Houston and then-husband Bobby Brown earned a record for being the most successful couple in pop music due to their combined global music successes at the time.
Best-selling single by a female artist ◆	"I Will Always Love You" has sold 40 million units worldwide, a record for a woman.
Best-selling single of the 1980s by a female artist ◆	"I Wanna Dance With Somebody (Who Loves Me)" sold over 22.2 million copies worldwide, no female single of that decade sold as many.
Most concurrent run at number one on three different global charts simultaneously	"I Will Always Love You" holds a global chart record for spending the most weeks at number one in three different global charts - United States, United Kingdom and Australia - for eight straight weeks.
The single to have a double-digit run at the pole position in the most countries	"I Will Always Love You" spent ten or more weeks on the charts in the United States, Canada, the United Kingdom, Australia and New Zealand, bringing a total of five, outdoing Bryan Adams, whose 1991 ballad, "Everything I Do (I Do It for You)", topped the charts for ten or more weeks in three countries.
Most World Music Awards wins in one night ◆	Houston has maintained an awards record of winning five World Music Awards in a single night in 1994. Singers such as Michael Jackson, Lady Gaga and 50 Cent matched Houston's total single award wins.

=== Europe ===
Records/Achievements	Notes
Longest stay at number-one on the European Hot 100 (female) ×	"I Will Always Love You" set the all-time record by a female artist for most weeks at number one on the European Hot 100 for 13 weeks. Only Cher, Celine Dion and Kylie Minogue spent more weeks.
First female recipient of the Global Icon Award at the MTV Europe Music Awards	Houston posthumously received the Global Icon Award on November 11, 2012 and was presented the award by Alicia Keys. Daughter Bobbi Kristina Brown and sister-in-law and former manager Pat Houston accepted the award in the singer's honor.

== Australia ==
Records/Achievements	Notes
First album by a black woman to top the albums chart in Australia.	Whitney Houston topped the Australian albums chart starting on the week of June 2, 1986 and spending 11 weeks atop the chart, including nine consecutive weeks at the top.
The longest-running number one album by a woman in Australia during the 1980s	Whitney Houston spent 11 cumulative weeks on the Australian albums chart, the longest run by a female artist.
The female artist with the most cumulative weeks at number one on the Australian albums chart in the 1980s	Houston spent 14 cumulative weeks atop the Australian albums chart with two albums -- Whitney Houston (11 weeks) and Whitney (3 weeks).
Best-selling female single of the 1990s in Australia	"I Will Always Love You" spent ten weeks at number one in Australia and sold more records there in the country than any other female single released in that decade.

== Belgium ==
Records/Achievements	Notes
Best-selling soundtrack of all time in Belgium	The Bodyguard ties with Saturday Night Fever as the best-selling soundtrack album of all time in Belgium with estimated sales of 200,000 units each.

== Brazil ==
Records/Achievements	Notes
Best-selling foreign soundtrack of all time in Brazil	The Bodyguard was certified 3× platinum in Brazil for sales of 750,000 units.

== Canada ==
Records/Achievements	Notes
First female album to sell a million copies in Canada	Houston's self-titled debut album, Whitney Houston (1985), was the first female album to be certified diamond for sales of a million copies after it was certified such on March 19, 1987.
Best-selling female album in Canada ×	Houston's self titled debut album set the record after it outsold Cyndi Lauper's She's So Unusual and became the first female album to go diamond in Canada. That record has since been taken by other artists, including Canadian female artists Shania Twain and Celine Dion.
Most cumulative weeks by a female artist on the Canadian RPM Albums chart in the 1980s	With 29 cumulative weeks at the top of its RPM Albums chart, Houston held a record for most weeks at number one on the chart by a female artist.

== Chile ==
Records/Achievements	Notes
Best selling soundtrack album of all time in Chile	The Bodyguard has sold over 100,000 units in Chile, making it the best-selling soundtrack of all time in the country.
Best-selling album by a female artist of all time in Chile	The Bodyguard is the best-selling female album of all time in Chile with sales of over 100,000 units.

== France ==
Records/Achievements	Notes
Best-selling soundtrack of all time in France	The Bodyguard remains the best-selling soundtrack in France with over a million sales, tied with James Horner's soundtrack to Titanic (1998).

== Germany ==
Records/Achievements	Notes
Longest-running number one soundtrack on the German albums chart	The Bodyguard shares this record with the soundtrack to Grease, both soundtracks spending eleven weeks atop the chart.

== Indonesia ==
Records/Achievements	Notes
Best-selling international album of all time (female)	The Bodyguard is the best-selling international album by a female artist with sales of 320,000 units.
Best-selling foreign soundtrack album of all time	The Bodyguard is the best-selling foreign soundtrack album of all time with sales of 320,000 units there.

== Italy ==
Records/Achievements	Notes
Best-selling soundtrack of all time	The Bodyguard is the best-selling soundtrack release of all time in Italy with sales of 1,025,000 copies in the country alone.

== Japan ==
Records/Achievements	Notes
First foreign album to sell 2 million copies in Japan	The Bodyguard became the first foreign album in Japanese music history to sell more than two million units, certifying at 2× million by the Recording Industry Association of Japan (RIAJ) in 1994.
Best selling foreign album of all time in Japan	The Bodyguard held a record as the best-selling international album of all time in Japan for sales of 2.8 million copies, later broken by Mariah Carey's Number Ones album, which has sold over 3 million copies. It remains the best-selling foreign soundtrack in Japan.
Best selling foreign soundtrack album of all time in Japan	At 2.8 million units sold in the country alone, The Bodyguard remains the best-selling soundtrack album of all time in Japan.
Best selling foreign single by a female artist of all time	"I Will Always Love You" sold over 810,000 copies by the end of 1993, becoming the best-selling foreign single by a female artist of all time in Japan at the time.

== Netherlands ==
Records/Achievements	Notes
Best selling female album of all time in the Netherlands	At an estimated 600,000 units, The Bodyguard is the best-selling female album of all time in the Netherlands, tied with Mariah Carey's Music Box and Celine Dion's Falling into You.

== South Korea ==
Records/Achievements	Notes
First foreign album to sell over 1 million copies in South Korea	The Bodyguard became the first foreign album in South Korea to sell over a million copies there.
Best-selling foreign album of all time in South Korea	The Bodyguard remains the best-selling foreign album of all time in South Korea with sales of 1.2 million.

== Sweden ==
Records/Achievements	Notes
Best-selling soundtrack of all time in Sweden	The Bodyguard remains the best-selling soundtrack of all time in Sweden with sales of 343,000 units.

== Switzerland ==
Records/Achievements	Notes
Best-selling soundtrack of all time in Switzerland	The Bodyguard is the best-selling soundtrack of all time in Switzerland with sales of 250,000 units, sharing the title with the Dirty Dancing soundtrack.

== United Kingdom ==
Records/Achievements	Notes
First female artist to have two albums sell over a million copies in the UK	Whitney Houston became the first female artist in UK chart history to have more than two albums sell over a million copies in the United Kingdom. To date, those albums – Whitney Houston (1985) and Whitney (1987), have sold 1.2 million and 2.4 million copies respectively in the United Kingdom.
First black solo female artist to top the UK Albums Chart	When the Whitney album debuted at number one on the UK Albums Chart in June 1987, Whitney became the first black solo female artist to have a number one album in the country. Prior to this achievement, the only other black female act to have a number one UK album was The Supremes.
First artist to enter the US and UK album charts at number one in the first week ◆	In June 1987, Whitney Houston's Whitney debuted at number one on both the Billboard 200 and UK Albums Chart in the first week of its release, with Whitney debuting at number one on the UK Albums Chart on 13 June 1987 and doing the same on the Billboard 200 for the week of June 27, eventually spending four weeks at number one on both charts simultaneously.
First female single to spend ten weeks at number one on the UK Singles Chart ◆	"I Will Always Love You" was the first single in history by a female artist to spend ten cumulative weeks at number one on the UK Singles Chart in 1992-93; later shared by Rihanna's "Umbrella" before the record was broken by Tones and I's "Dance Monkey" in 2019.
Best-selling 1990s UK single by a female artist × ◆	"I Will Always Love You" became the best-selling female single of all time and throughout the 1990s with sales of over 1.3 million pure units before the record was broken by Cher's "Believe" in 1999.
Best-selling UK single by an R&B female artist ◆	At 1.6 million copies, "I Will Always Love You" remains the best-selling female single of all time by an R&B artist in the United Kingdom.
Best-selling UK single of 1992	With 960,000 copies sold in the United Kingdom alone in 1992, "I Will Always Love You" was the best-selling single in the United Kingdom in that year.
First female artist to have a UK Christmas number one single	In Christmas week of 1992, Houston's "I Will Always Love You" maintained its position to reach this milestone.
Only artist to place the same song in the top ten year-end lists in the UK	Houston set the record with "I Will Always Love You" topping out as the number one single in the UK for 1992 and tenth best-selling single in the UK for 1993.
Most simultaneous weeks at number one on the US Billboard Hot 100 and UK Singles Chart (female artist)	"I Will Always Love You" spent the most weeks simultaneously at number one on the main US and UK singles charts at ten from December 5, 1992 to February 13, 1993; most by a female artist and an all-time record by any artist until "Shape of You" by Ed Sheeran in 2017 did eleven weeks.
Most simultaneous entries on the UK Singles Chart by a female artist ◆	In 2012, Houston re-entered the UK Singles Chart and produced 12 chart singles simultaneously inside the top 75, an all time record for a female artist; Houston broke a record originally set by Amy Winehouse, who had 11.

Others
Records/Achievements	Notes
Longest concert residency at Wembley Arena by a woman	Houston twice set the record for the most nights performed at London's Wembley Arena by a female performer in a single year; first setting the record with nine shows during the 1988 leg of her Moment of Truth World Tour, and breaking her record three years later with ten shows for the European leg of her I'm Your Baby Tonight World Tour.
Most performances at Wembley Arena (female)	Houston performed at Wembley Arena 27 times throughout her career from 1986 until 1999, generating the most performances by a female artist there, second only to Prince.
Most weeks accumulated on the UK charts	Houston is one of only a handful of artists who have accumulated a combined 1,000 weeks or more combined on the top 75 of the UK Albums and UK Singles charts and is the fourth most successful female artist on the list after Rihanna, Madonna and Taylor Swift.
Longest-charted compilation by a female artist	Houston's The Ultimate Collection (2007) spent 388 cumulative weeks on the UK Albums Chart, establishing an all-time record for a compilation album by a female artist in history.

== United States ==
Billboard records
Records/Achievements	Notes
Longest run at number one by a debuting female artist on the Billboard 200	Houston set the record when her debut album, Whitney Houston, spent 14 cumulative weeks at number one, becoming the longest chart run at the summit by a female debut artist, a record Houston still holds as of 2026.
First female artist to produce three number one singles off the same album	In May 1986, when Houston's rendition of "Greatest Love of All" topped the Billboard Hot 100, it made Houston the first female artist in history to produce three number one singles off a single album (Whitney Houston).
Longest running number one studio album by a black female artist on the Billboard 200	At 14 cumulative weeks between March and June 1986, Houston's self titled debut album holds the record for longest running number one studio release by a black female artist.
Longest run at number one on the Billboard Top Music Videocassettes chart by a female artist	Following the release of her first music video collection, The #1 Video Hits, in June 1986, it would top the chart for over 22 weeks, which remains an all-time record for a female artist.
First female artist to top the Billboard 200 Year-End list	Houston accomplished this when her debut album, Whitney Houston, topped the Year-End list for 1986. Houston remains the only female artist to top both the Billboard 200 and Hot R&B/Hip-Hop Albums in the same year.
First female artist to debut at number one on the Billboard 200 ◆	On June 27, 1987, Houston made history as the first female artist to debut at number one on the Billboard 200 with her sophomore release, Whitney. It was also only the fourth studio release - and fifth in all - to debut at number one.
First female artist to have their first two albums top the Billboard 200	When Whitney topped the Billboard 200 in June 1987, Houston became the first female artist to have their first two albums top the chart, joining the Monkees, the Beatles and Elvis Presley.
First female artist to produce four number one singles off the same album	In April 1988, Houston broke her own record when "Where Do Broken Hearts Go" became the fourth single from the Whitney album to top the Billboard Hot 100, making her the first female artist in history to produce four number one singles off a single album.
Most consecutive number-one hits on the Billboard Hot 100 ◆	On April 23, 1988, Houston became the first and only artist in US chart history to have seven consecutive number one singles on the Billboard Hot 100 after her single "Where Do Broken Hearts Go" topped the chart, surpassing the chart record of six set by the Beatles and the Bee Gees. (Note: Between October 1985 and April 1988, Houston landed seven consecutive number one singles in a row: "Saving All My Love for You", "How Will I Know", "Greatest Love of All", "I Wanna Dance with Somebody (Who Loves Me)", "Didn't We Almost Have It All", "So Emotional" and "Where Do Broken Hearts Go".)
Most number-one singles by a female artist on the Billboard Hot 100 × ◆	When Houston's ballad, "Where Do Broken Hearts Go" (Houston's seventh number one single), peaked at the top of the Billboard Hot 100 in April 1988, it broke Diana Ross' long-standing record of most number one singles. Houston eventually accumulated a total of 11 number-one singles. Today, Houston has the fourth most number ones by a female recording artist.
First female solo recording artist to record multiple number one singles off three albums	In February 1991, "All the Man That I Need" from I'm Your Baby Tonight reached number one on the Billboard Hot 100, her second straight number one from the album. In doing so, Houston became the first solo female artist in history to have three albums produce multiple number one singles. Of female artists, only Mariah Carey and Janet Jackson matched this feat.
Only artist to chart the top twenty – and top ten – with the national anthem on the Billboard Hot 100	Following the release of her rendition of "The Star Spangled Banner" from Super Bowl XXV and its peak of number 20 in March 1991, Houston became the only recording artist to send a recording of the national anthem to the top twenty of the Billboard Hot 100. Ten years later, in October 2001, following the September 11 attacks, Houston re-released the song and received a strong response as it rose to number six on the Billboard Hot 100, making Houston the only artist in history to send a recording of the national anthem to the top ten.
Most weeks at number-one on the Billboard Hot 100 (individual single) × ◆	"I Will Always Love You" earned the record for most cumulative weeks at number one on the Billboard Hot 100 after the song accumulated a fourteenth and final week at number one for the week of February 27, 1993, making it the longest running number one single in the history of the chart at the time. The record has since been broken.
Most consecutive weeks at number-one on the Billboard Hot 100 (individual single, solo artist) ◆	"I Will Always Love You" also earned the record for most consecutive weeks at number one on the Billboard Hot 100 by a solo artist with 14 weeks. Five years later, Elton John's "Candle in the Wind 1997," tied the record. As of 2026, both songs have kept this chart record for a non-duet/non-collaborative solo single.
Most consecutive weeks at number-one on the Billboard Hot 100 (individual single, female artist) ◆	As of 2026, "I Will Always Love You" holds the record for most consecutive weeks at number one on the Billboard Hot 100 by a solo female artist with 14 weeks in a row.
Most consecutive weeks simultaneously at number-one on three major Billboard charts	Between December 19, 1992 and January 16, 1993, "I Will Always Love You" held the number one spot for five weeks simultaneously on three major Billboard charts: the Billboard Hot 100, Hot R&B/Hip-Hop Songs and the Adult Contemporary chart, setting an all-time record that has yet to be broken; the song itself broke a 30-year chart record held by Ray Charles, whose 1962 hit, "I Can't Stop Loving You", stayed at number one on the same three charts for four weeks between June 9 and June 30, 1962.
Most number one entries on multiple Billboard charts with a single and album	During January 1993, "I Will Always Love You" and The Bodyguard topped thirteen Billboard charts simultaneously: Billboard 200, Top R&B Albums, Hot 100 Singles, Hot R&B Singles, Hot Adult Contemporary, Top Singles Sales, Top 40 Radio Monitor, Top 40 Airplay/Mainstream, Top 40 Airplay/Rhythm-crossover, R&B Singles Sales, R&B Radio Monitor, Eurochart Hot 100 Singles, and Eurochart Albums.
Most consecutive simultaneous weeks at number one on the Billboard 200 and Billboard Hot 100 charts	Houston's 12 consecutive simultaneous weeks at number one on the Billboard 200 and Billboard Hot 100 with The Bodyguard and "I Will Always Love You" matched a record set by The Beatles, who spent the same weeks at number one on the charts but with different projects throughout the calendar year of 1964 in which three singles – "I Want to Hold Your Hand", "She Loves You" and "Can't Buy Me Love" and two albums – Meet the Beatles! and The Beatles' Second Album - all hit number one for twelve weeks. Houston is the only artist to do it with a solitary album and single.
Most consecutive simultaneous weeks at number-one on the Billboard 200 and Billboard Hot 100 charts (individual artist)	As of 2026, Houston holds the record for most consecutive simultaneous weeks at number one on the Billboard 200 and Billboard Hot 100, spending 12 weeks at number one with The Bodyguard and "I Will Always Love You".
Most consecutive simultaneous weeks at number-one on the Billboard 200 and Billboard Hot 100 charts (female artist)	Houston holds the record for the most consecutive simultaneous weeks at number one on the Billboard 200 and Billboard Hot 100. The only other female artists on the list – Adele and Janet Jackson – trailed by 6 and 5 weeks respectively with their respective projects, 25 and "Hello" and Janet. and "That's the Way Love Goes".
Most cumulative weeks at No. 1 on the Hot R&B/Hip-Hop Songs chart	On February 13, 1993, "I Will Always Love You" spent its eleventh and final week at number one on the Hot R&B Singles chart. In doing so, the song broke the ten-year record held by Marvin Gaye for most weeks at number one on the chart after his 1982 hit, "Sexual Healing", spent ten weeks at number one on the chart. Houston's record was later broken by R. Kelly's 1994 hit, "Bump n' Grind", which spent 12 weeks. Since then, artists such as Deborah Cox, Mariah Carey, Mary J. Blige and SZA have spent longer weeks at number one on the chart, with SZA's "Kill Bill", now holding the record for most weeks atop the chart with 21.
Most consecutive simultaneous weeks at number-one on the Billboard Hot 100 and Hot R&B Singles chart	Between December 5, 1992 and February 11, 1993, "I Will Always Love You" was the number one hit on both the Billboard Hot 100 and Hot R&B/Hip-Hop Songs chart for 11 simultaneous weeks in a row. Houston has held this record since setting the mark. Though Mariah Carey's "We Belong Together" spent 14 weeks at number one on both the Hot 100 chart and the R&B chart, Carey's single was replaced at number one by Carrie Underwood's "Inside Your Heaven" after initially topping the Hot 100 for four weeks before returning back to number one for ten more weeks in a row.
First artist to send three songs to the top twenty of the Billboard Hot 100 in the Nielsen Soundscan era	For the week of March 13, 1993, Houston made chart history when three of her singles from The Bodyguard – "I Will Always Love You", "I'm Every Woman" and "I Have Nothing" – registered in the top 11 of the chart at numbers 5, 7 and 11 respectively, marking the first time an artist did so in the Nielsen Soundscan era.
First female artist to send three songs to the top twenty of the Billboard Hot 100	For the week of March 13, 1993, Houston made chart history when three of her singles from The Bodyguard – "I Will Always Love You", "I'm Every Woman" and "I Have Nothing" – registered in the top 11 of the chart at numbers 5, 7 and 11 respectively, marking the first time a female artist did so on the chart, joining The Beatles and The Bee Gees.
Longest cumulative run at number one for a single on three major Billboard charts	"I Will Always Love You" holds the record, as of 2026, as the single to spend 30 weeks at number one on three major Billboard charts: Hot 100 (14), Hot R&B Singles (11) and Adult Contemporary (5). It broke the previous record set by Ray Charles, whose 1962 hit "I Can't Stop Loving You" spent 19 cumulative weeks at number one on the same charts: Hot 100 (5), Hot R&B (10) and Adult Contemporary (4).
Most "triple-crown" Billboard number one singles ◆	When "I Will Always Love You" reached number one on the Adult Contemporary chart on December 19, 1992, Houston earned her fourth "triple crown" Billboard number one single in which she had a single top the Hot 100, R&B and adult contemporary charts. This helped her earn a record that had first been set by singer Lionel Richie, who also sent four songs to number one on the same charts. Besides "I Will Always Love You", Houston's "triple-crown" number ones include "Saving All My Love for You" (1985), "How Will I Know" (1986) and "All the Man That I Need" (1991).
Most "triple-crown" Billboard number one singles by a female artist ◆	While sharing it with Lionel Richie, Houston holds the all-time record of "triple-crown" Billboard number one singles by a female artist.
Most number one remakes on the Billboard Hot 100 ◆	When "I Will Always Love You" hit number one on the Billboard Hot 100 on November 28, 1992, it became Houston's fourth cover to reach number one, setting an all-time record for most number one remakes in pop chart history. Besides "I Will Always Love You", her other number one covers were "Saving All My Love for You" (1985), "Greatest Love of All" (1986) and "All the Man That I Need" (1991).
Longest-running number one soundtrack single on the Billboard Hot 100	As of 2026, "I Will Always Love You" remains the longest-running number one single on the Billboard Hot 100 to come out of a film soundtrack at 14 weeks.
First single to spend the first two months of the new year at number one on the Billboard Hot 100	When "I Will Always Love You" remained number one for much of January and February 1993, it marked the first time in Billboard Hot 100 history that a new song didn't register at number one until the first week of March.
First artist to have an album and single spend ten or more cumulative weeks at number one on the Billboard 200 and Billboard Hot 100	Houston set this record in 1993 with her soundtrack to The Bodyguard and "I Will Always Love You" spending 20 and 14 cumulative weeks respectively on those respective charts.
Longest initial run at number one on the Billboard 200 by a female artist	After Houston's Whitney (1987) became the first female album to debut at number one on the Billboard 200, it set another chart record by spending its first 11 weeks at number one on the chart, the record held until Taylor Swift's The Tortured Poets Department broke it with spending 12 initial weeks at number one.
Longest cumulative weeks at number one on the Billboard 200 by a female artist × ◆	The Bodyguard spent 20 cumulative weeks (13 of them consecutively) at number one on the Billboard 200, holding an all-time cumulative record for a female artist. It was later broken in 2012 by Adele's 21 album, which went on to spend 24 weeks. Both albums remain the only albums by a female artist to spend twenty or more weeks at number one on the Billboard 200.
Most cumulative weeks at number one by a woman on the Billboard 200 × ◆	Until 2020, Houston held the record for most cumulative weeks at number one by a female artist on the Billboard 200 with 46. The record was broken by Taylor Swift's Folklore that October.
First soundtrack single to debut at number one	On November 25, 1995, Houston's "Exhale (Shoop Shoop)" debuted at number one on the Billboard Hot 100, becoming the first soundtrack single to do so; "Exhale" was only the third single overall to debut at number one on the chart. Since then, only three other songs have joined it: Celine Dion's "My Heart Will Go On" (1998), Aerosmith's "I Don't Wanna Miss a Thing" (1998) and Justin Timberlake's "Can't Stop the Feeling!".
Longest consecutive run at number two on the Billboard Hot 100 following its debut atop the chart	For 11 weeks from December 2, 1995 through February 12, 1996, "Exhale (Shoop Shoop)" spent eleven consecutive weeks at number two on the Billboard Hot 100 after its debut at number one. At the time, it was the longest chart run on the chart until Kid Laroi and Justin Bieber's "Stay" beat it by a week. The song still holds the record for a solo single as well as the record for a female single.
Longest consecutive run at number two on the Billboard Hot 100 by a female artist following its debut atop the chart	"Exhale (Shoop Shoop)" maintains its record as the song with the longest consecutive run at number two on the Billboard Hot 100 after its debut at number one; it is currently tied all-time with a female artist alongside Olivia Rodrigo's "Good 4 U" (2021).
First album to debut at number one on the Top Gospel Albums chart (female artist)	The Preacher's Wife debuted at number one on the Billboard Top Gospel Albums chart for the week of December 14, 1996, the first for a female artist. It would stay at number one for a then-record setting 26 consecutive weeks.
First album by a female artist to debut atop the Billboard Top Gospel Albums chart	In its first week of release in December 1996, Houston's soundtrack to The Preacher's Wife debuted at number one on the chart, the first time a female album had accomplished this.
Most consecutive weeks atop the Billboard Top Gospel Albums chart	Houston's soundtrack to The Preacher's Wife spent 26 consecutive weeks atop the Billboard Top Gospel Albums chart, which was a lifetime record until it was broken by Kirk Franklin's The Nu Nation Project in 1999.
Most consecutive weeks atop the Billboard Top Gospel Albums chart (female artist)	Houston's soundtrack to The Preacher's Wife spent 26 consecutive weeks atop the Billboard Top Gospel Albums chart, which remains a chart record for a female artist.
Most singles to reach the top ten on three major Billboard charts	Between "You Give Good Love" in 1985 and "I Believe in You and Me" in 1996, Houston had sixteen singles to chart inside the top ten of the Billboard Hot 100, Hot R&B/Hip-Hop Songs and Adult Contemporary charts, which remains the most singles by an artist in history.
First female artist to send ten albums simultaneously on the Billboard 200 ◆	In March 2012, Houston became the first female artist to send ten albums simultaneously on the Billboard 200.
First female artist to send three albums simultaneously on the top ten of the Billboard 200 ◆	In March 2012, Houston became the first female artist to send three albums to the top ten of the Billboard 200, those albums include Whitney: The Greatest Hits, The Bodyguard and Whitney Houston.
First female artist to send the same song back to the top ten of the Billboard Hot 100	In February 2012, not too long after her death that month, Houston became the first female artist to send a song back to the top ten of the Billboard Hot 100 when "I Will Always Love You" reappeared at No. 7 for the week of February 25, 2012 and re-peaked at No. 3 for the week of March 3.
The first solo artist to send three albums at number one on the Billboard 200 for 11 weeks or more	Houston is the first solo artist in history to have three albums spend 11 or more weeks at number one on the Billboard 200 – Whitney Houston (1986, 14 weeks), Whitney (1987, 11 weeks) and The Bodyguard (1992, 20 weeks).
Greatest black female Billboard 200 artist of all time	Ranked 15th overall on the Billboard 200's Greatest of All Time Artists list, Houston is the highest black female artist ranked on the list and second only to Michael Jackson (#10) and only the fourth greatest female Billboard 200 artist behind Mariah Carey, Taylor Swift and Barbra Streisand.
Female artist with the longest span of top ten singles on the Billboard adult contemporary charts	Houston accomplished this after her Kygo-remixed rendition of "Higher Love" reached number 7 on the adult contemporary chart on March 7, 2020. Stretching back to August 18, 1984, when Houston was a featured duet partner on Teddy Pendergrass' "Hold Me", which reached number six on the chart, Houston has the longest span of top ten AC hits for a female artist at 35 years, 6 months, 18 days, surpassing Barbra Streisand, whose top ten span stretched 32 years, 7 months and 12 days.
Female artist with the most cumulative weeks of a compilation album on the Billboard 200	At 282 weeks, Houston's compilation, I Will Always Love You: The Best of Whitney Houston, is the longest-charting female compilation album of all time on the Billboard 200.
First black female artist to spend 1,000 cumulative weeks on the Billboard 200	For the week of March 29, 2025, Houston became the first black female recording artist to spend 1,000 cumulative weeks on the Billboard 200, joining Taylor Swift, Barbra Streisand, Adele and Madonna as just the fifth female artist to reach the milestone.

Selected Billboard records (by decade)
Records/Achievements	Notes
Most number one singles on the Billboard Hot 100 by a female artist (1980s) ±	With 7 number one singles, Houston was the female artist with the most number one singles on the Billboard Hot 100 recorded by a female artist in the 1980s, only matched with Madonna, trailing only Michael Jackson for most number one Billboard Hot 100 hits overall.
Most cumulative weeks at number one on the Billboard 200 by a female artist (1980s) ±	Houston spent a total of 25 cumulative weeks at number one on the Billboard 200, the most by a female artist in the 1980s, accomplishing this with two albums – Whitney Houston (1986, 14 weeks) and Whitney (1987, 11 weeks)
Longest initial run of a female album at number one on the Billboard 200 by a female artist (1980s) ±	Houston's Whitney (1987) album made a chart record on the Billboard 200 by spending its first 11 weeks at number one, the first album to do so.
Most consecutive weeks at number one on the Billboard 200 by a female artist (1980s) ±	Houston's Whitney (1987) album spent 11 weeks in a row at number one on the Billboard 200, the most weeks by a female artist in the 1980s.
The most weeks at number one on the Billboard 200 by a female artist with an individual album (1980s) ±	Whitney Houston topped the Billboard 200 for 14 cumulative weeks in 1986, the longest run for a female artist in the 1980s.
The only artist to have two albums do two-digit runs at number one on the Billboard (1980s) ±	Houston was the only artist in the 1980s to produce two albums that did two-digit runs at number one on the Billboard 200.
The most number-one singles on the Adult Contemporary chart by a female artist (1980s) ±	Houston scored the most number one on the Billboard Adult Contemporary chart in the 1980s with seven. (Note: "Saving All My Love for You", "How Will I Know", "Greatest Love of All", "I Wanna Dance with Somebody (Who Loves Me)", "Didn't We Almost Have It All", "Where Do Broken Hearts Go", "One Moment in Time")
The longest run of a single at number one on the Billboard Hot 100 by a solo artist (1990s) ±	"I Will Always Love You" spent fourteen weeks at number one, the longest run for a solo single of the 1990s, shared with Elton John's "Candle in the Wind 1997"
The longest run of a female album on the Billboard 200 (1990s) ±	The Bodyguard (1992) accumulated 20 weeks at number one on the Billboard 200, the longest run of any female album of the 1990s.

RIAA, Nielsen and sales records
Records/Achievements	Notes
Best-selling female R&B artist of the 20th century	According to a 1999 report from the Recording Industry Association of America (RIAA).
Best-selling soundtrack of all time in the United States ◆	According to a 1999 report from the Recording Industry Association of America (RIAA), The Bodyguard set the record at 17 million units; it's since sold 19 million units in the United States and has retained this record.
Best-selling album by a female artist in the US × ◆	For a while, the Whitney Houston album was the best-selling album by a female artist after it was certified 9× platinum by the RIAA in 1988. Later replaced by Houston's own soundtrack to The Bodyguard, around 1999. Since then, Shania Twain's Come On Over holds the title at 21× platinum.
First album to sell a million copies in a single week ◆	The Bodyguard sold 1.061 million copies during its sixth week of release in January 1993, becoming the first album since Nielsen SoundScan began tracking record sales in 1991 to do so.
The highest single-week sales of an album in history	The Bodyguard set the highest single-week sales of an album in the US twice, in its fifth and sixth weeks respectively, initially breaking a record set by Guns n' Roses' Use Your Illusion II with 831,000 units sold for the week of December 26 and 1,061,000 units for the week of January 2, 1993. Since then, other albums have outsold it.
Highest single-week sales by a female artist in history	The Bodyguard held the record for the highest single-week sales of an album by a female artist until the release of Britney Spears' Oops!... I Did It Again, which sold 1.319 million in its first week.
Highest single-week sales for a soundtrack album in history	As of 2026, The Bodyguard continues to hold the record for the highest single-week sales of a soundtrack album in the United States at 1.061 million.
The largest initial certification by an album in history	The Bodyguard was certified 6× platinum by the RIAA on January 18, 1993, producing the largest initial certification of an album at the time. It was later outdone by *NSYNC's No Strings Attached album, which received a 7× platinum certification in April 2000.
Highest initial certification of an album by a female artist in history	Houston has maintained this record after earning a 6× platinum certification by the RIAA in January 1993.
Highest single-week sales of a female single of all time × ◆	For the week ending December 27, 1992, "I Will Always Love You" set the all-time sales record of the highest single-week sales of a female single in history and held it for over 23 years before Adele beat the record with her single, "Hello", selling over a million copies. However, because all of the sales of "Hello" came from digital units, "I Will Always Love You" maintains its record for physical units sold.
Highest single-week sales of a physical single of all time (female artist) ◆	As of 2026, "I Will Always Love You" maintains its sales record for the highest single-week physical sales of a female single in history with over 632,000 units sold.
Fastest single-week sales of a physical single of all time ◆	In one week in December 1992, Houston's "I Will Always Love You" shifted 632,000 copies, which held the record for the fastest physical sales of a single in a week; Elton John's "Candle in the Wind '97" later broke the record.
Fastest single-week sales of a physical single of all time (female) ◆	Houston's "I Will Always Love You" shifted 632,000 copies, which remains the fastest physical sales of a single in a week of all time by a woman.
Only female single to sell over 4 million physical singles ◆	As of 2026, "I Will Always Love You" remains the only female single in history to sell four million physical units and was certified 4× platinum by the RIAA in January 1993. It has since gone 11× platinum/diamond with sales equivalent units of eleven million by the RIAA.
First album by a female artist to go diamond	On November 3, 1993, The Bodyguard made history as the first album by a female artist to sell over ten million units and was certified 10× platinum by the RIAA. In 1999, it was re-certified diamond.
First studio album by a female artist to go diamond	On January 25, 1994, Houston's self-titled debut album, Whitney Houston, was certified 10× platinum for sales of ten million units, making it the first studio release by a woman to go diamond.
Highest single-week sales of a gospel album	On the week of January 4, 1997, Billboard reported that The Preacher's Wife had sold an estimated 330,000 units, making it to this day the highest single-week sales of a gospel album in music history.
Most physical singles sold by a woman	Houston still holds the record for most physical single units by a woman with over 16.5 million singles alone in the United States by the end of the 20th century.
First black artist to accumulate three diamond-certified albums in the United States	Houston set the record in October 2020 when the Whitney (1987) album was certified diamond for sales of ten million copies, joining the albums, Whitney Houston (1985) and The Bodyguard (1992).

Television, film, concerts, awards and miscellaneous
Records/Achievements	Notes
First and only artist to win an Emmy Award from a Grammy Award performance	Houston set the record in September 1986 when she won the Emmy Award in 1986 for best individual performance in a variety or music program.
Highest-rated HBO-TV concert special ever	Houston's first HBO concert special, Welcome Home Heroes with Whitney Houston, was watched by over 50 million viewers, giving the channel its highest rated views ever. It's unclear whether or not Houston still holds this record.
Most-watched Disney TV movie	Cinderella, a film co-starring and produced by Houston, was the most watched Disney-related TV film in history with over 60 million viewers watching.
Most American Music Award wins by a woman × ◆	Houston won 22 American Music Awards between 1986 and 2009. The record was later broken by Taylor Swift.
Most American Music Award wins in a single night ◆	Houston won a total of eight American Music Awards, including the Award of Merit, at the 1994 ceremony; she shares this record with Michael Jackson, who won the same amount of awards and also received the Award of Merit. Houston had earlier set the record for a female artist in 1987 with five.
Most American Music Award wins in a single night (female artist) ◆	As of 2026, Houston still holds the record for most American Music Award wins in a single night by a female artist.
Most Billboard Music Award wins in a single night × ◆	Houston won a record-setting 11 Billboard Music Awards in 1993, then an all-time record. Since then, Adele and Drake have taken the record.
First recipient of the BET Lifetime Achievement Award ◆	On June 19, 2001, at the age of 37, Houston received the very first Lifetime Achievement Award at the BET Awards in Las Vegas, Nevada. Houston was presented the award by mother Cissy Houston, daughter Bobbi Kristina Brown, record producer Babyface and singer Mary J. Blige.
Highest grossing North American tour by a woman in the 1980s	With a net gross of $20.1 million, the American leg of Houston's Moment of Truth World Tour bested tours by contemporaries such as Madonna's Who's That Girl World Tour and Tina Turner's Break Every Rule World Tour to become the highest-grossing United States concert tour by a woman in the 1980s.
Highest-grossing romantic thriller in the box office	At $411 million in the domestic and international box office, The Bodyguard was the highest-grossing romantic thriller in the history of the box office; it's unclear if the film still holds the record.
Highest-grossing R-rated film in the box office	The Bodyguard set a then all-time box office record for being the highest grossing R-rated film in history with $411 million; at the time, it was the tenth highest-grossing film in history.
First black actress to earn $10 million for a motion picture	Houston set this record after agreeing to star in The Preacher's Wife in 1996.
Most covered female artist throughout the history of American Idol	Houston has reportedly been covered more than 50 times on the television show since its debut in 2002.
Most searched name on Google in 2012 ◆	Houston was the most searched name and item on Google after she died in 2012.
Highest-earning posthumous female celebrity of 2023 ◆	Houston's estate earned $30 million at the end of 2023, making Houston the highest-earned posthumous celebrity woman of the year.

== List of prestigious honors and recognitions ==
Records/achievements	Notes	Ref.
American Music Awards	Award of Merit	
American Music Awards	International Artist Award of Excellence	
BET Awards	BET Lifetime Achievement Award	
BET Honors	Entertainers Award	
BET Walk of Fame	Inducted to the Walk of Fame	
Billboard Music Award	Billboard Millennium Award	
Dove Awards	Outstanding mainstream contribution to gospel	
Georgia Music Hall of Fame	Posthumously inducted into the Hall of Fame	
Grambling State University	Received an Honorary Doctorate of Humane Letters	
Grammy Awards	Received the Grammy Lifetime Achievement Award for career achievement in music	
Grammy Hall of Fame	The Whitney Houston album inducted into the Grammy Hall of Fame	
Grammy Hall of Fame	The "I Will Always Love You" recording inducted into the Grammy Hall of Fame	
National Recording Registry	"I Will Always Love You" included in the registry for artistic and historical significance.	
MTV Europe Music Awards	Received the Global Icon Award	
National Rhythm & Blues Hall of Fame	Inducted into the National Rhythm and Blues Hall of Fame	
New Jersey Hall of Fame	Inducted into the New Jersey Hall of Fame	
New Jersey Walk of Fame	Inducted into the New Jersey Walk of Fame	
RIAA Century Awards	Ranked the Best-Selling Female R&B Artist of the 20th Century	
Rock and Roll Hall of Fame	Inducted into the Rock and Roll Hall of Fame	
Songwriters Hall of Fame	Received the Howie Richmond Hitmaker Award	
Soul Train 25th Anniversary Hall of Fame	Inducted into the show's 25th anniversary's Hall of Fame	
Soul Train Music Awards	Received the Sammy Davis Jr. Entertainer of the Year Award	
Soul Train Music Awards	Received the Quincy Jones Award for Career Achievement	
Soul Train Music Awards	Received the Female Artist of the Decade Award	
World Music Awards	Received the Legend Award	

== Critic lists ==
Year/era	Publication(s)	List or Work	Rank	Ref.
1999	VH1	100 Greatest Women in Rock	61	
2002	VH1	100 Greatest Women in Music (Poll)	4	
2003	VH1	200 Greatest Pop Culture Icons	116	
2012	VH1	100 Greatest Women in Music	6	
2003	VH1	50 Greatest Women of the Video Era	3	
2010	VH1	100 Greatest Artists of All Time	60	
2012	ABC	30 Greatest Women in Music	1	
2015	The Daily Telegraph	Pop's 20 Greatest Female Artists	15	
2020	Essence	50 Most Influential R&B Stars	5	
2022	Essence	The 10 Best Soloists of All Time	1	
2023	Essence	66 Boundary-Breaking Black Women Who Have Paved the Way	10	

== Record sales and statistics ==
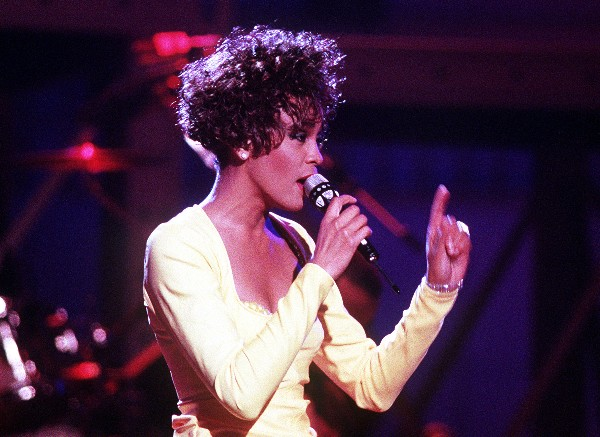
Whitney Houston performing at the concert "Welcome Home Heroes with Whitney Houston"

=== Best-selling albums worldwide ===
Released year	Album	Claimed sales	Ref.
1992	The Bodyguard	45 million	
1985	Whitney Houston	25 million	
1987	Whitney	20 million	
1998	My Love Is Your Love	15 million	
1995	Waiting to Exhale	12 million	
1990	I'm Your Baby Tonight	10 million	
2000	Whitney: The Greatest Hits	10 million	

=== Best-selling singles worldwide ===
Released year	Single	Claimed sales	Ref.
1992	I Will Always Love You	24 million	
1987	I Wanna Dance with Somebody (Who Loves Me)	22.2 million	
1993	I Have Nothing	12 million	
1985	How Will I Know	11 million	
1999	My Love Is Your Love	10 million	
1986	Greatest Love of All	8 million	
2019	Higher Love	8 million	

=== Timeline of Houston's total career sales worldwide ===
Year	Claimed sales	Notes	Ref.
1987	14,000,000	The Washington Post stated that Houston has sold 14 million records worldwide during the first 2 years since her debut (1985–1987).	
1995	85,000,000	After the release of Whitney, I'm Your Baby Tonight, The Bodyguard and Waiting to Exhale, Houston has reached 85 million career sales.	
1997	100,000,000	Sales of The Bodyguard and Whitney Houston, continued throughout the 1990s decade, allowing Houston to reach 100 million in career sales.	
2001	140,000,000	In 2001, Billboard, updates her sales.	
2009	170,000,000	After the release of Just Whitney, One Wish: The Holiday Album, I Look To You, and several compilation albums, Houston has reached 170 million career sales.	
2012	200,000,000	In 2012, after her death, Houston returned to the world music charts and her sales increased, reaching 200 million records.	
2024	220,000,000	In 2024, following the release of the biopic Whitney Houston: I Wanna Dance with Somebody, its soundtrack and the new compilation I Go to the Rock: The Gospel Music of Whitney Houston, Sony Music announced that Houston has surpassed 220 million career sales.	

== See also ==
- List of accolades received by Whitney Houston
- Best-selling albums in the United States since Nielsen SoundScan tracking began
- List of best-selling albums by women
- List of best-selling music artists
- List of fastest-selling albums
- List of best-selling albums in Europe
