= List of accolades received by Whitney Houston =

Whitney Houston awards and nominations
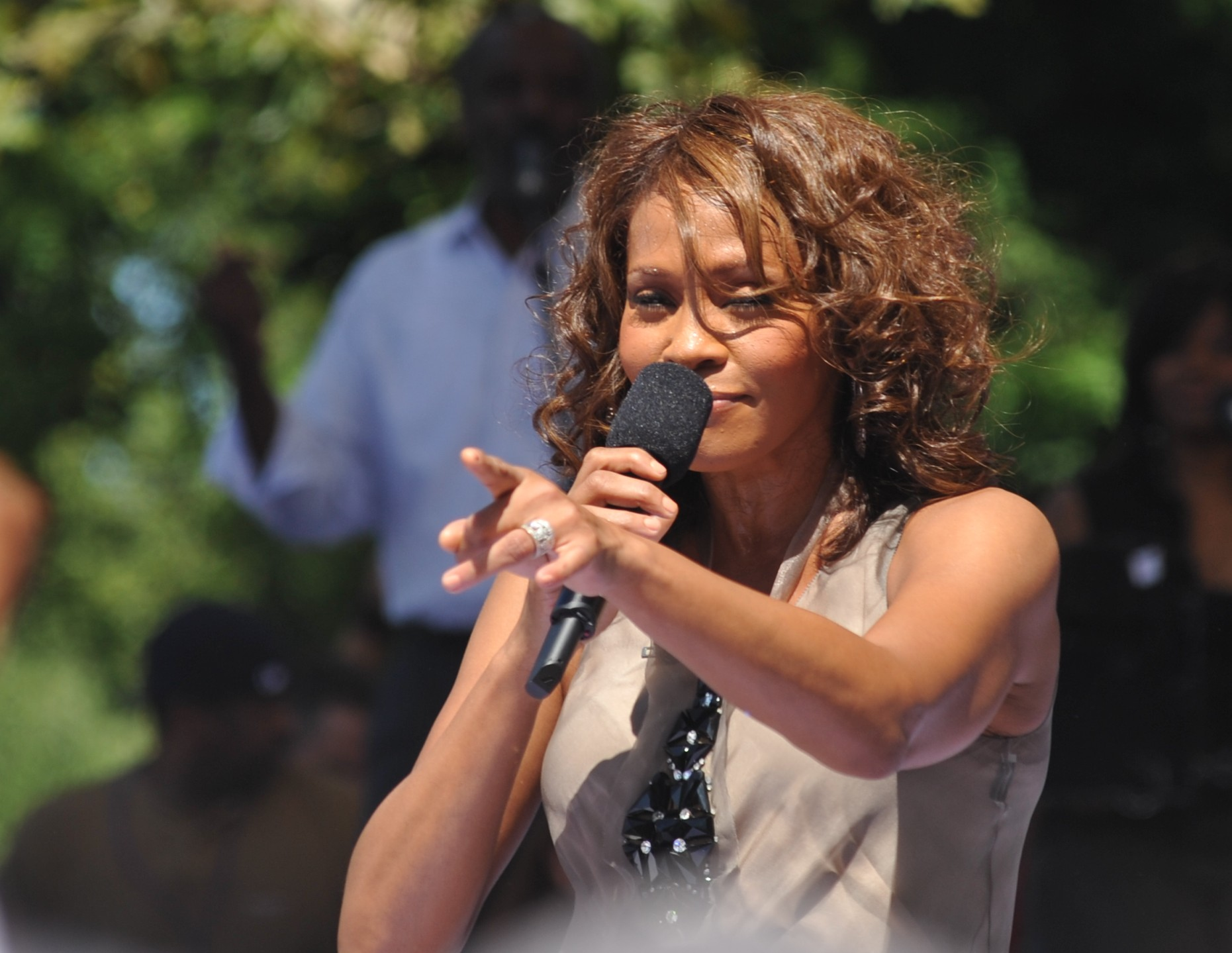
- Houston in 2009
Awards and nominations
| Award | Wins | Nominations |
| American Music Awards | 22 | 38 |
| Billboard | 16 | 22 |
| Brit | 2 | 7 |
| Grammy | 9 | 25 |
| MTV VMA | 1 | 3 |
| Soul Train | 9 | 16 |
| World Music | 5 | 5 |
| Emmy Awards | 2 | 3 |

Totals (Note: Certain award groups do not simply award one winner. They acknowledge several different recipients, have runners-up, and have third place. Since this is a specific recognition and is different from losing an award, runner-up mentions are considered wins in this award tally. For simplification and to avoid errors, each award in this list has been presumed to have had a prior nomination.)
- Wins: 437
- Nominations: 564

Whitney Houston was an American singer, actress and film producer who received numerous awards and honorary accolades throughout a career that spanned more than 25 years and posthumously as well. Known as "The Voice," she is one of the most significant cultural icons, and the most awarded female artist of the 20th century. With 22 wins out of 38 nominations, Houston is the second most-awarded female American Music Awards winner ever; at the 1994 American Music Awards, Houston won a record eight AMAs, setting an all-time record for most wins in a single night. She is the second most awarded winning entertainer at the NAACP Image Awards with 20 wins. Houston is the ninth most awarded artist at the Billboard Music Awards with 16, including 11 alone in 1993. In 2012, Houston posthumously was awarded the Billboard Millennium Award. Houston is one of the few secular artists to receive awards for gospel work, winning a Stellar Award and two Dove Awards.

Between 1986 and 2000, Houston received six competitive Grammy Awards out of 25 nominations. In 1994, Houston won the Grammy Award for Album of the Year for her soundtrack album, The Bodyguard, from the film of the same name while winning Record of the Year for "I Will Always Love You". In addition, Houston is a two-time inductee to the Grammy Hall of Fame and a recipient of the Grammy Lifetime Achievement Award, which brings her total to nine Grammys. Houston also won five World Music Awards, all of them in a single night record in 1994, including the Legend Award. In 2023, Houston was just one of thirteen inaugural musicians to receive the Brit Billion Award for earning a career billion streams in the United Kingdom. (Note: Houston was the first posthumous artist to be given the award and remains the only black female artist to receive the award.) A prominent fixture on music video stations such as MTV, BET and VH1 since the 1980s, Houston has been honored with awards from all three networks, and was the first recipient of the Lifetime Achievement Award at the BET Awards and the first female artist to receive the Global Icon Award at the MTV Europe Music Awards.

Although music was her primary source of accomplishment, Houston also received nominations and awards for other works in philanthropy, film and television. Houston received two Emmy Awards in 1986 and 1988, the former for a 1986 Grammy Awards performance, and the latter for having her song "One Moment in Time" being played during coverage of the 1988 Seoul Olympics. Houston was nominated for several acting awards for her works in The Bodyguard, Waiting to Exhale, The Preacher's Wife and Sparkle, later winning the NAACP Image Award for Outstanding Actress for her role in The Preacher's Wife. Houston's work on Cinderella won her another Emmy nomination. Houston received a United Negro College Fund award, a Presidential honor and a VH1 Honors Award for her philanthropy work.

Houston has been inducted into multiple halls of fame, including the Georgia Music Hall of Fame, the New Jersey Hall of Fame, the Songwriters Hall of Fame and the National Rhythm & Blues Hall of Fame as well as the Grammy Hall of Fame. Houston's landmark recording of "I Will Always Love You" was inducted into the Library of Congress' National Recording Registry for the class of 2019. In 2020, Houston was inducted into the Rock and Roll Hall of Fame on her first nomination. A prominent black female entertainer, she was also inducted into the BET Walk of Fame and the Soul Train Hall of Fame.

== Awards and nominations ==
| Award/organization (Note: Charts are not included, unless they are explicitly described as "awards" or specific trophies are given.) | Year | Nominee/work | Category | Result | Ref. |
|---|---|---|---|---|---|
| ALMA Awards | 1999 | "When You Believe" (duet with Mariah Carey) | Outstanding Performance of a Song for a Feature Film | Nominated | |
| ALMA Awards | 1999 | "When You Believe" (duet with Mariah Carey) | Outstanding Music Video | Nominated | |
| American Black Achievement Awards | 1986 | Whitney Houston | The Music Award | Nominated | |
| American Black Achievement Awards | 1987 | Whitney Houston | The Music Award (Note: Shared with Luther Vandross.) | Won | |
| American Black Achievement Awards | 1991 | Whitney Houston | The Music Award (Note: Houston was presented this award for her achievements as an award-winning recording, performing and video artist, for her successful I'm Your Baby Tonight World Tour, for her best-selling video and single of "The Star-Spangled Banner" performed at Super Bowl XXV and for her multi-platinum album, I'm Your Baby Tonight.) | Won | |
| American Black Achievement Awards | 1994 | Whitney Houston | The Music Award | Won | |
| American Music Awards | 1986 | Whitney Houston | Favorite Pop/Rock Female Artist | Nominated | |
| American Music Awards | 1986 | Whitney Houston | Favorite Soul/R&B Female Artist | Nominated | |
| American Music Awards | 1986 | Whitney Houston | Favorite Soul/R&B Video Artist | Nominated | |
| American Music Awards | 1986 | Whitney Houston | Favorite Soul/R&B Album | Nominated | |
| American Music Awards | 1986 | "You Give Good Love" | Favorite Soul/R&B Single | Won | |
| American Music Awards | 1986 | "Saving All My Love for You" | Favorite Soul/R&B Video | Won | |
| American Music Awards | 1987 | Whitney Houston | Favorite Pop Rock Female Artist | Won | |
| American Music Awards | 1987 | Whitney Houston | Favorite Soul/R&B Female Artist | Won | |
| American Music Awards | 1987 | Whitney Houston | Favorite Pop/Rock Female Video Artist | Nominated | |
| American Music Awards | 1987 | Whitney Houston | Favorite Soul/R&B Female Video Artist | Nominated | |
| American Music Awards | 1987 | Whitney Houston | Favorite Pop/Rock Album | Won | |
| American Music Awards | 1987 | Whitney Houston | Favorite Soul/R&B Album | Won | |
| American Music Awards | 1987 | "Greatest Love of All" | Favorite Soul/R&B Video Single | Won | |
| American Music Awards | 1988 | Whitney Houston | Favorite Pop/Rock Female Artist | Won | |
| American Music Awards | 1988 | Whitney Houston | Favorite Soul/R&B Female Artist | Nominated | |
| American Music Awards | 1988 | "I Wanna Dance with Somebody (Who Loves Me)" | Favorite Pop/Rock Single | Won | |
| American Music Awards | 1989 | Whitney Houston | Favorite Pop/Rock Female Artist | Won | |
| American Music Awards | 1989 | Whitney Houston | Favorite Soul/R&B Female Artist | Won | |
| American Music Awards | 1992 | Whitney Houston | Favorite Pop/Rock Female Artist | Nominated | |
| American Music Awards | 1992 | Whitney Houston | Favorite Soul/R&B Female Artist | Nominated | |
| American Music Awards | 1992 | Whitney Houston | Favorite Adult Contemporary Artist | Nominated | |
| American Music Awards | 1992 | I'm Your Baby Tonight | Favorite Soul/R&B Album | Nominated | |
| American Music Awards | 1992 | I'm Your Baby Tonight | Favorite Adult Contemporary Album | Nominated | |
| American Music Awards | 1994 | Whitney Houston | Favorite Pop/Rock Female Artist | Won | |
| American Music Awards | 1994 | Whitney Houston | Favorite Soul/R&B Female Artist | Won | |
| American Music Awards | 1994 | Whitney Houston | Favorite Adult Contemporary Artist | Nominated | |
| American Music Awards | 1994 | The Bodyguard | Favorite Pop/Rock Album | Won | |
| American Music Awards | 1994 | The Bodyguard | Favorite Soul/R&B Album | Won | |
| American Music Awards | 1994 | The Bodyguard | Favorite Adult Contemporary Album | Won | |
| American Music Awards | 1994 | "I Will Always Love You" | Favorite Pop/Rock Single | Won | |
| American Music Awards | 1994 | "I Will Always Love You" | Favorite Soul/R&B Single | Won | |
| American Music Awards | 1997 | Whitney Houston | Favorite Adult Contemporary Artist | Won | |
| American Music Awards | 1997 | Waiting to Exhale | Favorite Soundtrack (Note: This award is given to the producer, not artist.) | Won | |
| American Music Awards | 1998 | The Preacher's Wife | Favorite Soundtrack | Nominated | |
| American Music Awards | 2000 | Whitney Houston | Favorite Pop/Rock Female Artist | Nominated | |
| American Music Awards | 2000 | Whitney Houston | Favorite Soul/R&B Female Artist | Nominated | |
| American Music Awards | 2000 | My Love Is Your Love | Favorite Soul/R&B Album | Nominated | |
| American Music Awards | 2000 | Whitney Houston | Artist of the Decade (1980s) | Nominated | |
| American Music Awards | 2001 | Whitney Houston | Favorite Soul/R&B Female Artist | Nominated | |
| AMFT Awards (Note: AMFT Awards is an online awards group.) | 1985 | "How Will I Know" | Best Pop Solo Vocal Performance | Won | |
| AMFT Awards | 1986 | "Greatest Love of All" | Best Pop Solo Vocal Performance | Won | |
| AMFT Awards | 1987 | "I Wanna Dance with Somebody (Who Loves Me)" | Best Pop Solo Vocal Performance | Won | |
| AMFT Awards | 1992 | "I Will Always Love You" | Best Pop Solo Vocal Performance | Won | |
| Amusement & Music Operations (AMOA) Jukebox Awards | 1993 | "I Will Always Love You" | Jukebox Pop Single of the Year | Won | |
| Amusement & Music Operations (AMOA) Jukebox Awards | 1993 | "I Will Always Love You" | Jukebox R&B Single of the Year | Won | |
| Amusement & Music Operations (AMOA) Jukebox Awards | 1993 | The Bodyguard | R&B CD of the Year | Won | |
| Arista Records | 1988 | Whitney Houston | Award for Seven Consecutive Number One Singles | Won | |
| ASCAP Film & Television Music Awards | 1997 | "Count On Me" (with Michael Houston) | Most Performed Songs | Won | |
| ASCAP Pop Awards | 1997 | "Count On Me" (with Michael Houston) | Award-Winning Pop Songs | Won | |
| Bambi Awards | 1999 | Whitney Houston | International Pop Artist of the Year | Won | |
Billboard Music Awards
| Billboard Music Awards | 1991 | Whitney Houston | Top R&B Artist | Won | |
| Billboard Music Awards | 1991 | I'm Your Baby Tonight | Top R&B Album | Won | |
| Billboard Music Awards | 1991 | Whitney Houston | Top R&B Albums Artist | Won | |
| Billboard Music Awards | 1991 | Whitney Houston | Top R&B Singles Artist | Won | |
| Billboard Music Awards | 1993 | Whitney Houston | Hot 100 Singles Artist | Won | |
| Billboard Music Awards | 1993 | "I Will Always Love You" | Hot 100 Single | Won | |
| Billboard Music Awards | 1993 | Whitney Houston | Hot R&B Singles Artist | Won | |
| Billboard Music Awards | 1993 | "I Will Always Love You" | Hot R&B Single | Won | |
| Billboard Music Awards | 1993 | The Bodyguard | Top Billboard 200 Album | Won | |
| Billboard Music Awards | 1993 | The Bodyguard | Top R&B Album | Won | |
| Billboard Music Awards | 1993 | The Bodyguard | Top Soundtrack Album | Won | |
| Billboard Music Awards | 1993 | Whitney Houston | #1 World Artist | Won | |
| Billboard Music Awards | 1993 | "I Will Always Love You" | #1 World Single | Won | |
| Billboard Music Awards | 1993 | The Bodyguard | Special Award: Top Album Most Weeks at #1 (20 weeks) | Won | |
| Billboard Music Awards | 1993 | "I Will Always Love You" | Special Award: Top Single Most Weeks at #1 (14 weeks) | Won | |
| Billboard Music Awards | 2020 | "Higher Love" | Top Dance/Electronic Song | Nominated | |
| Billboard Music Awards | 2023 | I Go to the Rock: The Gospel Music of Whitney Houston | Top Gospel Album | Nominated | |
| Billboard Music of the '80s Poll Awards | 1990 | Whitney Houston | Pop Artist of the Decade | 5th place | |
| Billboard Music of the '80s Poll Awards | 1990 | Whitney Houston | Black Artist of the Decade | 3rd place (Note: Shared with Luther Vandross.) | |
| Billboard Music of the '80s Poll Awards | 1990 | Whitney Houston | Adult Contemporary Artist of the Decade | 3rd place | |
| Billboard Music of the '80s Poll Awards | 1990 | Whitney Houston | Black Album of the Decade | 4th place | |
| Billboard Music of the '80s Poll Awards | 1990 | "Greatest Love of All" | Adult Contemporary Single of the Decade | 5th place | |
Billboard Number One Awards (Note: Prior to the inauguration of the Billboard Music Awards in 1990, the magazine had the "Number One Awards" to honor the top-performing artists of the year on each of chart categories.)
| Billboard Number One Awards | 1985 | Whitney Houston | Top Black Artists - Female | Won | |
| Billboard Number One Awards | 1985 | Whitney Houston | New Pop Artists | Won | |
| Billboard Number One Awards | 1985 | Whitney Houston | New Black Artists | Won | |
| Billboard Number One Awards | 1985 | Whitney Houston | Top Black Singles Artists - Female | Won | |
| Billboard Number One Awards | 1985 | Whitney Houston | Top Adult Contemporary Artists - Female | Won | |
| Billboard Number One Awards | 1986 | Whitney Houston | Top Pop Artist of the Year | Won | |
| Billboard Number One Awards | 1986 | Whitney Houston | Top Pop Artists - Female | Won | |
| Billboard Number One Awards | 1986 | Whitney Houston | Top Pop Albums Artist | Won | |
| Billboard Number One Awards | 1986 | Whitney Houston | Top Pop Albums Artist - Female | Won | |
| Billboard Number One Awards | 1986 | Whitney Houston | Top Black Albums Artist | Won | |
| Billboard Number One Awards | 1986 | Whitney Houston | Top Black Albums Artist - Female | Won | |
| Billboard Number One Awards | 1986 | Whitney Houston | Top Adult Contemporary Artists - Female | Won | |
| Billboard Number One Awards | 1986 | Whitney Houston | Top Pop Albums | Won | |
| Billboard Number One Awards | 1986 | Whitney Houston | Top Black Albums | Won | |
| Billboard Number One Awards | 1987 | Whitney Houston | Top Pop Albums Artist - Female | Won | |
| Billboard Number One Awards | 1987 | Whitney Houston | Top Adult Contemporary Artists - Female | Won | |
| Billboard Number One Awards | 1988 | Whitney Houston | Top Pop Singles Artist - Female | Won | |
| Billboard Number One Awards | 1988 | Whitney Houston | Top Black Artists - Female | Won | |
| Billboard Number One Awards | 1988 | Whitney Houston | Top Black Albums Artist - Female | Won | |
| Billboard Number One Awards | 1988 | Whitney Houston | Top Adult Contemporary Artists - Female | Won | |
| Black Gold Awards | 1986 | Whitney Houston | Outstanding New Female Artist | Won | |
| Black Reel Awards | 2013 | "Celebrate" (featuring Jordin Sparks) | Best Original or Adapted Song | Nominated | |
| Blockbuster Entertainment Awards | 1997 | The Preacher's Wife | Favorite Female, Comedy/Romance | Nominated | |
| Blockbuster Entertainment Awards | 1997 | Whitney Houston | Favorite Female Artist, R&B | Won | |
| Blockbuster Entertainment Awards | 1998 | The Preacher's Wife | Favorite Soundtrack | Nominated | |
| Blockbuster Entertainment Awards | 1999 | Whitney Houston | Favorite Female, R&B | Nominated | |
| Blockbuster Entertainment Awards | 2000 | My Love Is Your Love | Favorite Female Artist, R&B | Nominated | |
| Blockbuster Entertainment Awards | 2000 | "Heartbreak Hotel" (featuring Faith Evans and Kelly Price) | Favorite Single (Internet Only) | Nominated | |
| Blockbuster Entertainment Awards | 2000 | "When You Believe" (with Mariah Carey) | Favorite Single from a Movie (Internet Only) | Nominated | |
| Blockbuster Entertainment Awards | 2001 | Whitney: The Greatest Hits | Favorite Female Artist, R&B | Nominated | |
| B'nai B'rith | 1987 | Whitney Houston | Creative Achievement Award | Won | |
| Bravo Otto | 1988 | Whitney Houston | Best Female Singer | Silver | |
| Bravo Otto | 1993 | Whitney Houston | Best Actress | Silver | |
| Bravo Otto | 1993 | Whitney Houston | Best Female Singer | Silver | |
BRIT Awards
| BRIT Awards | 1987 | Whitney Houston | Best International Solo Act | Nominated | |
| BRIT Awards | 1988 | Whitney Houston | Best International Solo Artist | Nominated | |
| BRIT Awards | 1989 | Whitney Houston | International Female Solo Artist | Nominated | |
| BRIT Awards | 1991 | Whitney Houston | Best International Female Artist | Nominated | |
| BRIT Awards | 1994 | The Bodyguard | Best Soundtrack/Cast Recording | Won | |
| BRIT Awards | 2000 | Whitney Houston | Best International Female Artist | Nominated | |
| BRIT Awards | 2023 | Whitney Houston | Brits Billion Award | Won | |
CableACE Awards
| CableACE Awards | 1992 | HBO Presents Welcome Home Heroes with Whitney Houston | Best Performance in a Music Special or Series | Won | |
| CableACE Awards | 1992 | HBO Presents Welcome Home Heroes with Whitney Houston | Best Music Special | Nominated | |
| CableACE Awards | 1995 | Whitney, The Concert For A New South Africa | Performance in a Music Special or Series | Nominated | |
| CableACE Awards | 1995 | VH-1 Honors With CeCe Winans | Performance in a Music Special or Series | Nominated | |
| Cash Box Awards (Note: The Cash Box Awards were distinct from the magazine's year-end awards. They were mid-year awards, published annually in Cash Box's directory issue, and were based on a poll of record industry professionals.) | 1985 | Whitney Houston | Pop Albums, New Female | Selected (Note: This category was unranked. Whitney Houston was one of three artists listed, alongside Sade and Alison Moyet.) | |
| Cash Box Awards | 1985 | Whitney Houston | Pop Singles, New Female | 4th place | |
| Cash Box Awards | 1985 | Whitney Houston | Black Contemporary Albums, Female | 3rd place | |
| Cash Box Awards | 1985 | Whitney Houston | Black Contemporary Albums, New Female | 2nd place | |
| Cash Box Awards | 1985 | Whitney Houston | Black Contemporary Singles, Female | 3rd place | |
| Cash Box Awards | 1985 | Whitney Houston | Black Contemporary Singles, New Female | 2nd place | |
| Cash Box Awards | 1985 | "You Give Good Love" | Black Contemporary Singles, Top 10 | 8th place | |
| Cash Box Awards | 1986 | Whitney Houston | Pop Albums, Top 10 | Won | |
| Cash Box Awards | 1986 | Whitney Houston | Pop Albums, Female | Won | |
| Cash Box Awards | 1986 | Whitney Houston | Pop Albums, New Female | Won | |
| Cash Box Awards | 1986 | "How Will I Know" | Pop Singles, Top 10 | 8th place | |
| Cash Box Awards | 1986 | Whitney Houston | Pop Singles, Female | Won | |
| Cash Box Awards | 1986 | Whitney Houston | Black Contemporary Albums, Top 10 | 2nd place | |
| Cash Box Awards | 1986 | Whitney Houston | Black Contemporary Albums, Female | 2nd place | |
| Cash Box Awards | 1986 | Whitney Houston | Black Contemporary Albums, New Female | 2nd place | |
| Cash Box Awards | 1986 | Whitney Houston | Black Contemporary Singles, Female | 2nd place | |
| Cash Box Awards | 1986 | "How Will I Know" | 12" Singles, Top 10 | 8th place | |
| Cash Box Awards | 1986 | Whitney Houston | 12" Singles, Top Female Vocalist | 3rd place | |
| Cash Box Awards | 1986 | "How Will I Know" | Music Video, Top 10 | 5th place | |
| Cash Box Awards | 1986 | Whitney Houston | Music Video, Top Female Vocalist | Won | |
| Cash Box Awards | 1986 | Whitney Houston | Compact Disc | 5th place | |
| Cash Box Awards | 1988 | Whitney Houston | Pop Singles, Top B/C Females (Note: The original category name was "Top B/C Females", where "B/C" stood for "Black Contemporary". Cash Box also presented separate Black Contemporary award categories in the same issue.) | 3rd place | |
| Cash Box Year-End Awards | 1985 | Whitney Houston | Special Achievement Award: Black/Contemporary Albums | Won | |
| Cash Box Year-End Awards | 1985 | Whitney Houston | Pop Singles Awards: Most Promising New Female Vocalist | Won | |
| Cash Box Year-End Awards | 1985 | Whitney Houston | Pop Singles Awards: Top Female Artist | 2nd place | |
| Cash Box Year-End Awards | 1985 | Whitney Houston | Pop Singles Awards: Top New Female Vocalists | 2nd place | |
| Cash Box Year-End Awards | 1985 | Whitney Houston | Pop Singles Awards: Top Black Contemporary Female Artists | 2nd place | |
| Cash Box Year-End Awards | 1985 | Whitney Houston | Pop Singles Awards: Top Adult Contemporary Female Artists | Won | |
| Cash Box Year-End Awards | 1985 | Whitney Houston | Pop Album Awards: Top New Female Vocalists | Won | |
| Cash Box Year-End Awards | 1985 | Whitney Houston | Pop Album Awards: Top Female Adult Contemporary Artists | 2nd place | |
| Cash Box Year-End Awards | 1985 | Whitney Houston | Pop Album Awards: Top Female Artist | 3rd place | |
| Cash Box Year-End Awards | 1985 | Whitney Houston | Pop Album Awards: Top Black Contemporary Female Artist | 2nd place | |
| Cash Box Year-End Awards | 1985 | Whitney Houston | Black Contemporary Album Awards: Top Female Artist | Won | |
| Cash Box Year-End Awards | 1985 | Whitney Houston | Black Contemporary Album Awards: Top New Female Artist | Won | |
| Cash Box Year-End Awards | 1985 | Whitney Houston | Black Contemporary Singles Awards: Top Female Artist | Won | |
| Cash Box Year-End Awards | 1985 | Whitney Houston | Black Contemporary Singles Awards: Top New Female Artists | 2nd place | |
| Cash Box Year-End Awards | 1985 | Whitney Houston | Music Video Awards: Top New Female Vocalists | Won | |
| Cash Box Year-End Awards | 1985 | Whitney Houston | Black Contemporary Album Awards | 3rd place | |
| Cash Box Year-End Awards | 1986 | Whitney Houston | Pop Albums Awards: Top Female Artists | Won | |
| Cash Box Year-End Awards | 1986 | Whitney Houston | Pop Albums Awards: Top Female Artists | Won | |
| Cash Box Year-End Awards | 1986 | Whitney Houston | Pop Albums Awards: Top Adult Contemporary Artists | Won | |
| Cash Box Year-End Awards | 1986 | Whitney Houston | Pop Albums Awards: Top Black Contemporary Artists | Won | |
| Cash Box Year-End Awards | 1986 | Whitney Houston | Black Contemporary Singles Awards: Top Female Artists | 3rd place | |
| Cash Box Year-End Awards | 1986 | Whitney Houston | Top Pop Albums | Won | |
| Cash Box Year-End Awards | 1987 | Whitney Houston | Pop Singles Awards: Top Adult Contemporary Female Artist | Won | |
| Cash Box Year-End Awards | 1987 | Whitney Houston | Pop Singles Awards: Top Black Contemporary Female Artist | Won | |
| Cash Box Year-End Awards | 1987 | Whitney Houston | Pop Singles Awards: Top Female Artists | 2nd place | |
| Cash Box Year-End Awards | 1987 | Whitney Houston | Pop Albums Awards: Top Female Artist | Won | |
| Cash Box Year-End Awards | 1987 | Whitney Houston | Pop Albums Awards: Top Adult Contemporary Female Artist | Won | |
| Cash Box Year-End Awards | 1987 | Whitney Houston | Pop Albums Awards: Top Black/Contemporary Female Artist | Won | |
| Cash Box Year-End Awards | 1987 | Whitney Houston | Black Contemporary Singles Awards: Top Female Artists | 4th place | |
| Cash Box Year-End Awards | 1987 | "I Wanna Dance with Somebody (Who Loves Me)" | Top 50 Singles Awards | 2nd place | |
| Cash Box Year-End Awards | 1988 | Whitney Houston | Pop Singles Awards: Top Female Artist | Won | |
| Cash Box Year-End Awards | 1988 | Whitney Houston | Pop Singles Awards: Top Female Adult Contemporary Artist | Won | |
| Cash Box Year-End Awards | 1988 | Whitney Houston | Pop Singles Awards: Top Female Black Contemporary Artist | Won | |
| Cash Box Year-End Awards | 1988 | Whitney Houston | Black Contemporary Singles Awards: Top Female Artists | 3rd place | |
| Cash Box Year-End Awards | 1991 | Whitney Houston | Pop Singles Awards: Top Female Crossover Artist | Won | |
| Cash Box Year-End Awards | 1991 | Whitney Houston | Pop Albums Awards: Top Female Artists | 4th place | |
| Cash Box Year-End Awards | 1991 | Whitney Houston | Top Female R&B Album Artists | Won | |
| Cash Box Year-End Awards | 1991 | I'm Your Baby Tonight | Top R&B Albums | Won | |
| Cash Box Year-End Awards | 1993 | Whitney Houston | Pop Singles Awards: Top Female Artist | Won | |
| Cash Box Year-End Awards | 1993 | The Bodyguard | Top Pop Albums | Won | |
| Cash Box Year-End Awards | 1993 | The Bodyguard | Top R&B Albums | Won | |
| Cash Box Year-End Awards | 1993 | The Bodyguard | Top Soundtrack Albums | Won | |
| Dove Awards (The Gospel Music Association) | 1998 | "I Go to the Rock" | Best Traditional Recorded Gospel Song | Won | |
| DiVi Awards (International Recording Media Association) | 2000 | Whitney: The Greatest Hits | Best Music Release | Nominated | |
| Echo Awards | 2000 | My Love Is Your Love | Künstlerin des Jahres International (International Female Artist of the Year) | Nominated | |
| Echo Awards | 2001 | Whitney: The Greatest Hits | Künstlerin des Jahres International (International Female Artist of the Year) | Nominated | |
| Echo Awards | 2010 | I Look to You | Künstlerin International Rock/Pop (International Rock/Pop Female Artist) | Nominated | |
| Edison Music Awards | 2000 | Whitney Houston | Beste Zangeres Internationaal (Best International Female Artist) | Nominated | |
| Primetime Emmy Awards | 1986 | Whitney Houston | Outstanding Individual Performance in a Variety or Music Program | Won | |
| Primetime Emmy Awards | 1998 | Rodgers and Hammerstein's Cinderella (Note: Houston earned a nomination as an executive producer.) | Outstanding Variety, Music Or Comedy Special | Nominated | |
| Sports Emmy Awards | 1988 | "One Moment in Time" | Music (as singer/performer) | Won | |
| Entertainment Weekly Reader's Poll | 1991 | Whitney Houston | Best Singer | Won | |
| Garden State Music Awards | 1988 | Whitney Houston | Best Female Vocalist, Rock/Pop | Won | |
| Garden State Music Awards | 1988 | Whitney | Best Album, Rock/Pop | Won | |
| Garden State Music Awards | 1988 | "So Emotional" | Best Single, Rock/Pop | Won | |
| Garden State Music Awards | 1988 | Whitney Houston | Best Female Vocalist, R&B/Dance | Won | |
| Garden State Music Awards | 1988 | Whitney | Best Album, R&B/Dance | Won | |
| Garden State Music Awards | 1988 | "So Emotional" | Best Single, R&B/Dance | Won | |
| Garden State Music Awards | 1988 | "I Wanna Dance with Somebody (Who Loves Me)" | Best Music Video | Won | |
| Golden Raspberry Awards | 1993 | Whitney Houston | Worst Actress | Nominated | |
| Golden Raspberry Awards | 1993 | Whitney Houston | Worst New Star | Nominated | |
| Golden Raspberry Awards | 1993 | "Queen of the Night" | Worst Original Song | Nominated | |
| Global Awards | 2020 | "Higher Love" | Best Song of 2019 | Nominated | |
| Grammy Awards | 1986 | "Saving All My Love for You" | Best Pop Vocal Performance, Female | Won | |
| Grammy Awards | 1986 | Whitney Houston | Album of the Year | Nominated | |
| Grammy Awards | 1986 | "You Give Good Love" | Best R&B Vocal Performance, Female | Nominated | |
| Grammy Awards | 1987 | "Greatest Love of All" | Record of the Year | Nominated | |
| Grammy Awards | 1988 | Whitney | Album of the Year | Nominated | |
| Grammy Awards | 1988 | "I Wanna Dance with Somebody (Who Loves Me)" | Best Pop Vocal Performance, Female | Won | |
| Grammy Awards | 1988 | "For the Love of You" | Best R&B Vocal Performance, Female | Nominated | |
| Grammy Awards | 1989 | "One Moment in Time" | Best Pop Vocal Performance, Female | Nominated | |
| Grammy Awards | 1990 | "It Isn't, It Wasn't, It Ain't Never Gonna Be" (with Aretha Franklin) | Best R&B Vocal Performance by a Duo or Group | Nominated | |
| Grammy Awards | 1991 | "I'm Your Baby Tonight" | Best Pop Vocal Performance, Female | Nominated | |
| Grammy Awards | 1992 | "All the Man That I Need" | Best Pop Vocal Performance, Female | Nominated | |
| Grammy Awards | 1993 | "I Belong to You" | Best R&B Vocal Performance, Female | Nominated | |
| Grammy Awards | 1994 | The Bodyguard | Album of the Year | Won | |
| Grammy Awards | 1994 | "I Will Always Love You" | Record of the Year | Won | |
| Grammy Awards | 1994 | "I Will Always Love You" | Best Pop Vocal Performance, Female | Won | |
| Grammy Awards | 1994 | "I'm Every Woman" | Best R&B Vocal Performance, Female | Nominated | |
| Grammy Awards | 1997 | "Count On Me" | Best Pop Collaboration with Vocals (with CeCe Winans) | Nominated | |
| Grammy Awards | 1997 | "Count On Me" | Best Song Written for Visual Media (with Babyface and Michael Houston) | Nominated | |
| Grammy Awards | 1997 | "Exhale (Shoop Shoop)" | Best Female R&B Vocal Performance | Nominated | |
| Grammy Awards | 1998 | The Preacher's Wife | Best R&B Album | Nominated | |
| Grammy Awards | 1998 | "I Believe in You and Me" | Best Female R&B Vocal Performance | Nominated | |
| Grammy Awards | 2000 | "When You Believe" (with Mariah Carey) | Best Pop Collaboration with Vocals | Nominated | |
| Grammy Awards | 2000 | My Love Is Your Love | Best R&B Album | Nominated | |
| Grammy Awards | 2000 | "Heartbreak Hotel" (with Faith Evans and Kelly Price) | Best R&B Vocal Performance by a Duo or Group | Nominated | |
| Grammy Awards | 2000 | "It's Not Right but It's Okay" | Best Female R&B Vocal Performance | Won | |
| HitAwards | 1999 | Hit of the Year | "When You Believe" | Nominated | |
| Hit Awards (Hong Kong) | 1993 | Whitney Houston | Top Female Artist | Won | |
| Hit Awards (Hong Kong) | 1993 | "I Will Always Love You" | Song of the Year | Won | |
| iHeartRadio Music Awards | 2020 | "Higher Love" | Dance Song of the Year | Nominated | |
| iHeartRadio Music Awards | 2020 | "Higher Love" | Best Remix | Nominated | |
| IM&MC Video Music Awards (International Music & Media Conference) | 1987 | "Greatest Love of All" | Best Female Performance | Won | |
| International Dance Music Awards | 2000 | "It's Not Right but It's Okay" | Best Pop 12" Dance Record | Won | |
Japan Gold Disc Awards
| Japan Gold Disc Awards | 1993 | The Bodyguard | グランプリ・アルバム賞 (Album of the Year, International) | Won | |
| Japan Gold Disc Awards | 1993 | The Bodyguard | アルバム賞 ― 企画 (Compilation Album of the Year, International) | Won | |
| Japan Gold Disc Awards | 1993 | "I Will Always Love You" | グランプリ・シングル賞 (Single of the Year, International) | Won | |
| Japan Gold Disc Awards | 1994 (Note: Special Award - this award is presented by the Recording Industry Association of Japan (RIAJ) to the product which released before that year, sales over one million units or higher than a product get the award on the same category in that year.) | The Bodyguard | 特別賞 (Special Award, International) | Won | |
| Japan Gold Disc Awards | 1994 | "I Will Always Love You" | 特別賞 (Special Award, International) | Won | |
| Japan Gold Disc Awards | 2001 | Whitney: The Greatest Hits | Pop Album of the Year (International) | Won | |
| Juno Awards | 1994 | The Bodyguard | Best-Selling Album - Foreign or Domestic | Won | |
| M6 Awards | 2000 | Whitney Houston | Artiste Féminine Internationale de l'Année (International Female Artist of the Year) | Nominated | |
| Meteor Music Awards | 2001 | Whitney: The Greatest Hits | Best International Female | Won | |
| MOBO Awards | 1999 | Whitney Houston | Best International Act | Nominated | |
| MTV Europe Music Awards | 1999 | Whitney Houston | Best Female | Nominated | |
| MTV Europe Music Awards | 1999 | Whitney Houston | Best R&B | Won | |
| MTV Movie & TV Awards | 1993 | Whitney Houston | Best Female Performance | Nominated | |
| MTV Movie & TV Awards | 1993 | Whitney Houston | Best Breakthrough Performance | Nominated | |
| MTV Movie & TV Awards | 1993 | Whitney Houston | Best On-Screen Duo (with Kevin Costner) | Nominated | |
| MTV Movie & TV Awards | 1993 | The Bodyguard | Best Movie | Nominated | |
| MTV Movie & TV Awards | 1993 | "I Will Always Love You" | Best Song From a Movie | Won | |
| MTV Movie & TV Awards | 1996 | "Exhale (Shoop Shoop)" | Best Song from a Movie | Nominated | |
| MTV Video Music Awards | 1986 | "How Will I Know" | Best Female Video | Won | |
| MTV Video Music Awards | 1986 | "How Will I Know" | Best New Artist | Nominated | |
| MTV Video Music Awards | 1999 | "Heartbreak Hotel" | Best R&B Video | Nominated | |
| Music & Media DJ Awards | 1987 | Whitney Houston | Female Artist of the Year | 2nd place | |
| Music & Media Year-End Awards | 1986 | Whitney Houston | Female Artist of the Year (Albums) | Won | |
| Music & Media Year-End Awards | 1987 | Whitney Houston | Female Artist of the Year | Won | |
| Music & Media Year-End Awards | 1987 | "I Wanna Dance with Somebody (Who Loves Me)" | Single of the Year | Won | |
| Music & Media Year-End Awards | 1988 | Whitney Houston | Female Artist of the Year | 3rd place | |
| Music & Media Year-End Awards | 1991 | Whitney Houston | Top Female Artists (Albums) | 2nd place | |
| Music & Media Year-End Awards | 1993 | Whitney Houston | Top 3 Female Artists (Albums) | Won | |
| Music & Media Year-End Awards | 1993 | Whitney Houston | Top 3 Female Artists (Singles) | Won | |
| Music & Media Year-End Awards | 1993 | The Bodyguard | Top 3 Albums Sales | Won | |
| Music & Media Year-End Awards | 1993 | "I Will Always Love You" | Top 3 Singles Sales | 3rd place | |
| Music & Media Year-End Awards | 1999 | Whitney Houston | Top 10 Artists (Albums) | 4th place | |
| Music & Media Year-End Awards | 1999 | Whitney Houston | Top 10 Female Artists (Albums) | 3rd place | |
| Music & Media Year-End Awards | 1999 | Whitney Houston | Top 10 Artists (Singles) | 2nd place | |
| Music & Media Year-End Awards | 1999 | Whitney Houston | Top 10 Female Artists (Singles) | 2nd place | |
| Music & Media Year-End Awards | 2000 | Whitney Houston | Top 10 Female Artists (Singles) | 8th place | |
| Music & Media Year-End Awards | 2000 | Whitney Houston | Top 10 Artists (Albums) | 10th place | |
| Music & Media Year-End Awards | 2000 | Whitney Houston | Top 10 Female Artists (Albums) | 3rd place | |
| Music Week Year-End Awards | 1987 | Whitney | Top Album | 3rd place | |
| Music Week Year-End Awards | 1987 | Whitney | Top Dance/Disco Album | 2nd place | |
| Music Week Year-End Awards | 1987 | "I Wanna Dance with Somebody (Who Loves Me)" | Top Single | 3rd place | |
| Music Week Year-End Awards | 1987 | "I Wanna Dance with Somebody (Who Loves Me)" | Top Dance/Disco Single | 3rd place | |
| Music Week Year-End Awards | 1992 | "I Will Always Love You" | Top Singles | Won | |
| Music Week Year-End Awards | 1993 | The Bodyguard | Top Compilations | Won | |
| NAACP Image Awards | 1985 | Whitney Houston | Outstanding New Artist | Won | |
| NAACP Image Awards | 1986 | Whitney Houston | Outstanding Female Artist | Nominated | |
| NAACP Image Awards | 1987 | Whitney | Outstanding Female Artist | Nominated | |
| NAACP Image Awards | 1992 | I'm Your Baby Tonight | Outstanding Female Artist | Nominated | |
| NAACP Image Awards | 1992 | HBO Presents Welcome Home Heroes with Whitney Houston | Outstanding Variety Series or Special | Nominated | |
| NAACP Image Awards | 1994 | Whitney Houston | Entertainer of the Year | Won | |
| NAACP Image Awards | 1994 | The Bodyguard | Outstanding Album | Won | |
| NAACP Image Awards | 1994 | The Bodyguard | Outstanding Soundtrack Album, Film or TV | Won | |
| NAACP Image Awards | 1994 | The Bodyguard | Outstanding Female Artist | Won | |
| NAACP Image Awards | 1994 | "I'm Every Woman" | Outstanding Music Video | Won | |
| NAACP Image Awards | 1994 | The Bodyguard | Outstanding Actress | Nominated | |
| NAACP Image Awards | 1995 | Whitney Houston | Entertainer of the Year | Won | |
| NAACP Image Awards | 1996 | Waiting to Exhale | Outstanding Film | Won | |
| NAACP Image Awards | 1996 | Waiting to Exhale | Outstanding Actress | Nominated | |
| NAACP Image Awards | 1996 | "Exhale (Shoop Shoop)" | Outstanding Song | Won | |
| NAACP Image Awards | 1996 | "Exhale (Shoop Shoop)" | Outstanding Female Artist | Won | |
| NAACP Image Awards | 1996 | Waiting to Exhale | Outstanding Album | Won | |
| NAACP Image Awards | 1996 | Waiting to Exhale | Outstanding Soundtrack Album | Won | |
| NAACP Image Awards | 1996 | VH1 Honors (with CeCe Winans) | Outstanding Performance in a Variety Series/Special | Nominated | |
| NAACP Image Awards | 1996 | Nickelodeon Kids' Choice Awards | Outstanding Performance in an Educational/Informational Youth or Children's Series/Special | Nominated | |
| NAACP Image Awards | 1997 | The Preacher's Wife | Outstanding Film | Nominated | |
| NAACP Image Awards | 1997 | The Preacher's Wife | Outstanding Actress | Won | |
| NAACP Image Awards | 1997 | The Preacher's Wife | Outstanding Gospel Artist (with the Georgia Mass Choir) | Won | |
| NAACP Image Awards | 1997 | The Preacher's Wife | Outstanding Album | Won | |
| NAACP Image Awards | 1998 | Cinderella | Outstanding Television Movie/Mini-Series | Nominated | |
| NAACP Image Awards | 1998 | Classic Whitney: Live from Washington, D.C. | Outstanding Performance in a Variety Series/Special | Nominated | |
| NAACP Image Awards | 1999 | My Love Is Your Love | Outstanding Album | Nominated | |
| NAACP Image Awards | 1999 | My Love Is Your Love | Outstanding Female Artist | Nominated | |
| NAACP Image Awards | 1999 | "When You Believe" (with Mariah Carey) | Outstanding Duo or Group | Won | |
| NAACP Image Awards | 1999 | "When You Believe" (with Mariah Carey) | Outstanding Music Video | Nominated | |
| NAACP Image Awards | 1999 | "When You Believe" (with Mariah Carey) | Outstanding Song | Nominated | |
| NAACP Image Awards | 2000 | "Heartbreak Hotel" | Outstanding Female Artist | Won | |
| NAACP Image Awards | 2000 | "My Love Is Your Love" | Outstanding Song | Nominated | |
| NAACP Image Awards | 2010 | Whitney Houston | Outstanding Female Artist | Nominated | |
| NAACP Image Awards | 2010 | "I Look to You" | Outstanding Music Video | Won | |
| NAACP Image Awards | 2013 | "I Look to You" | Outstanding Song | Won | |
| NAACP Image Awards | 2013 | I Will Always Love You: The Best of Whitney Houston | Outstanding Album | Won | |
| NARM Best-Seller Awards (National Association of Recording Merchandisers) | 1986 | Whitney Houston | Best-selling Album by a New Artist | Won | |
| NARM Best-Seller Awards (National Association of Recording Merchandisers) | 1986 | Whitney Houston | Best-selling Black Album by a Female Artist | Won | |
| NARM Best-Seller Awards (National Association of Recording Merchandisers) | 1987 | Whitney Houston | Best-selling Album | Won | |
| NARM Best-Seller Awards (National Association of Recording Merchandisers) | 1987 | Whitney Houston | Best-selling Album by a Female Artist | Won | |
| NARM Best-Seller Awards (National Association of Recording Merchandisers) | 1987 | Whitney Houston | Best-selling Black Music Album by a Female Artist | Won | |
| NARM Best-Seller Awards (National Association of Recording Merchandisers) | 1988 | Whitney | Best-selling Album | Nominated | |
| NARM Best-Seller Awards (National Association of Recording Merchandisers) | 1988 | Whitney | Best-selling Album by a Female Artist | Won | |
| NARM Best-Seller Awards (National Association of Recording Merchandisers) | 1988 | Whitney | Best-selling Black Music Album by a Female Artist | Won | |
| NARM Best-Seller Awards (National Association of Recording Merchandisers) | 1991 | I'm Your Baby Tonight | Best-selling Black Music Album, Female | Nominated | |
| NARM Best-Seller Awards (National Association of Recording Merchandisers) | 1992 | I'm Your Baby Tonight | Best-selling Black Music Recording, Female | Nominated | |
| NARM Best-Seller Awards (National Association of Recording Merchandisers) | 1993 | "I Will Always Love You" | Top-selling Single of the Year | Won | |
| NARM Best-Seller Awards (National Association of Recording Merchandisers) | 1993 | The Bodyguard | Best-selling Movie or TV Soundtrack | Won | |
| NARM Best-Seller Awards (National Association of Recording Merchandisers) | 1994 | The Bodyguard | Best-selling Chartmaker Recording | Won | |
| NARM Best-Seller Awards (National Association of Recording Merchandisers) | 1994 | The Bodyguard | Best-selling Soundtrack | Won | |
| NARM Best-Seller Awards (National Association of Recording Merchandisers) | 1996 | Waiting to Exhale | Best-selling Soundtrack | Won | |
| NARM Best-Seller Awards (National Association of Recording Merchandisers) | 1997 | The Preacher's Wife | Best-selling Gospel Album | Won | |
| New York Music Awards | 1986 | Whitney Houston | Debut Act of the Year | Won | |
| New York Music Awards | 1986 | Whitney Houston | Best Pop-Soul Act | Won | |
| New York Music Awards | 1986 | Whitney Houston | Best Female Pop Vocalist | Won | |
| New York Music Awards | 1986 | Whitney Houston | Best Female Soul Vocalist | Won | |
| New York Music Awards | 1987 | Whitney Houston | Outstanding Solo Artist of the Year | Won | |
| New York Music Awards | 1987 | Whitney Houston | Best Female Pop Artist of the Year | Won | |
| New York Music Awards | 1988 | Whitney Houston | Best Female Pop Vocalist | Won | |
| Nickelodeon Kids' Choice Awards | 1987 | Whitney Houston | Favorite Female Vocalist | Nominated | |
| Nickelodeon Kids' Choice Awards | 1988 | "I Wanna Dance with Somebody (Who Loves Me)" | Favorite Song | Nominated | |
| Nickelodeon Kids' Choice Awards | 1989 | Whitney Houston | Favorite Female Musician/Group | Nominated | |
| Nickelodeon Kids' Choice Awards | 1994 | Whitney Houston | Favorite Singer | Won | |
| Nickelodeon Kids' Choice Awards | 1997 | Whitney Houston | Favorite Movie Actress | Nominated | |
| NRJ Music Awards | 2000 | Whitney Houston | Artiste féminine internationale de l'année (International Female Artist of the Year) | Nominated | |
| NRJ Music Awards | 2000 | My Love Is Your Love | Album international de l'année (International Album of the Year) | Won | |
| People's Choice Awards | 1987 | Whitney Houston | Favorite Female Musical Performer | Won (Note: Shared with Madonna.) | |
| People's Choice Awards | 1988 | Whitney Houston | Favorite Female Musical Performer | Won | |
| People's Choice Awards | 1989 | Whitney Houston | Favorite Female Musical Performer | Won | |
| People's Choice Awards | 1993 | Whitney Houston | Favorite Female Musical Performer | Won | |
| People's Choice Awards | 1993 | "I Will Always Love You" | Favorite New Music Video | Won | |
| People's Choice Awards | 1993 | Whitney Houston | Favorite Actress in a Dramatic Motion Picture | Nominated | |
| People's Choice Awards | 1995 | Whitney Houston | Favorite Female Musical Performer | Nominated | |
| People's Choice Awards | 1996 | Whitney Houston | Favorite Female Musical Performer | Nominated | |
| People's Choice Awards | 1997 | Whitney Houston | Favorite Female Musical Performer | Nominated | |
| People's Choice Awards | 1998 | Whitney Houston | Favorite Female Musical Performer | Won (Note: Shared with Reba McEntire.) | |
| People Reader's Poll | 1986 | Whitney Houston | Top New Artist | Won | |
| People Reader's Poll | 1988 | Whitney Houston | Best Female Artist | Won | |
| Perfect 10 Music Awards (Singapore) | 1993 | The Bodyguard | Best Soundtrack | Won | |
| Porin Awards | 1994 | The Bodyguard | Best Foreign Pop/Rock Album | Won | |
| Porin Awards | 1994 | "I Will Always Love You" | Best Foreign Music Video | Won | |
| Radio & Records | 1987 | "I Wanna Dance With Somebody (Who Loves Me)" | CHR Record of the Year | Won | |
| RCA Records UK | 2010 | Whitney Houston | 500,000 copies of I Look to You sold combined in the UK and Ireland | Won | |
| Rennbahn Express | 1988 | Whitney Houston | Best Female Singer | Won | |
| Rennbahn Express | 1999 | Whitney Houston | Best Female Singer | 2nd place | |
| RIAA | 1999 | Whitney Houston | Top-selling Female R&B Artist of the Century | Won | |
| RIAA | 1999 | The Bodyguard | Top-selling Soundtrack Album of the Century | Won | |
| Rolling Stone Music Awards | 1985 | Whitney Houston | Best New Female Singer of the Year | Won | |
| RTHK International Pop Poll Awards | 1986 | Whitney Houston | The Most Popular Female Vocalist | Won | |
| RTHK International Pop Poll Awards | 1993 | "I Will Always Love You" | Top Remake | Won | |
| RTHK International Pop Poll Awards | 1993 | "I Will Always Love You" | Top Ten Gold Song | Won | |
| RTHK International Pop Poll Awards | 1993 | Whitney Houston | Top Female Artist | Won | |
| Smash Hits Poll Winners Party (Note: Until 1987, the results of the annual readers' poll were published only in the magazine. Beginning in 1988, the winners were announced at the annual Smash Hits Poll Winners Party and were also published in the magazine.) (Smash Hits Readers’ Poll) | 1986 | Whitney Houston | Best Female Singer | 3rd place | |
| Smash Hits Poll Winners Party (Smash Hits Readers’ Poll) | 1986 | Whitney Houston | Most Fanciable Person, Female | 5th place | |
| Smash Hits Poll Winners Party (Smash Hits Readers’ Poll) | 1987 | Whitney | Worst LP | 7th place | |
| Smash Hits Poll Winners Party (Smash Hits Readers’ Poll) | 1987 | Whitney Houston | Most Fanciable Female | 2nd place | |
| Smash Hits Poll Winners Party (Smash Hits Readers’ Poll) | 1987 | "I Wanna Dance with Somebody (Who Loves Me)" | Best Video | 10th place | |
| Smash Hits Poll Winners Party (Smash Hits Readers’ Poll) | 1987 | Whitney Houston | Best Female Singer | 2nd place | |
| Smash Hits Poll Winners Party (Smash Hits Readers’ Poll) | 1987 | Whitney Houston | Worst Female Singer | 4th place | |
| Smash Hits Poll Winners Party (Smash Hits Readers’ Poll) | 1988 | Whitney Houston | Best Female Solo Singer | 3rd place | |
| Smash Hits Poll Winners Party (Smash Hits Readers’ Poll) | 1988 | Whitney Houston | Most Fanciable Female | 7th place | |
| Smash Hits Poll Winners Party (Smash Hits Readers’ Poll) | 1993 | Whitney Houston | Best Female Solo Singer | Won | |
| Smash Hits Poll Winners Party (Smash Hits Readers’ Poll) | 1993 | The Bodyguard | Best Album | 5th place | |
| Smash Hits Poll Winners Party (Smash Hits Readers’ Poll) | 1993 | " I Will Always Love You" | Best Single | 8th place | |
| Smash Hits Poll Winners Party (Smash Hits Readers’ Poll) | 1993 | Whitney Houston | Best Film Actress | 5th place | |
| Smash Hits Poll Winners Party (Smash Hits Readers’ Poll) | 1993 | Whitney Houston | Most Fanciable Female Star | 3rd place | |
| Smash Hits Poll Winners Party (Smash Hits Readers’ Poll) | 1993 | The Bodyguard | Best Film | 2nd place | |
| Smash Hits Poll Winners Party (Smash Hits Readers’ Poll) | 1993 | Whitney Houston | Worst Female Singer | 8th place | |
| Smash Hits Poll Winners Party (Smash Hits Readers’ Poll) | 1993 | Whitney Houston | Worst Film Actor/Actress | 7th place | |
| Smash Hits Poll Winners Party (Smash Hits Readers’ Poll) | 1993 | Whitney Houston | Least Fanciable Female | 10th place | |
| Smash Hits Poll Winners Party (Smash Hits Readers’ Poll) | 1993 | The Bodyguard | Worst Film | 4th place | |
| Smash Hits Poll Winners Party (Smash Hits Readers’ Poll) | 1994 | Whitney Houston | Best Female Solo Singer | 7th place | |
| Smash Hits Poll Winners Party (Smash Hits Readers’ Poll) | 1995 | Whitney Houston | Best Female Solo Singer | 9th place | |
| Smash Hits Poll Winners Party (Smash Hits Readers’ Poll) | 1995 | Whitney Houston | Most Fanciable Female Star | 8th place | |
| Smash Hits Poll Winners Party (Smash Hits Readers’ Poll) | 1999 | Whitney Houston | Best Female Solo Star | 8th place | |
| Smash Hits Poll Winners Party (Smash Hits Readers’ Poll) | 1999 | Whitney Houston | Best Parent in Pop | 10th place | |
| Smooth Icons | 2019 | Whitney Houston | Greatest artist of all time | 4th place | |
| Smooth Icons | 2020 | Whitney Houston | Greatest artist of all time | 4th place | |
| Smooth Icons | 2021 | Whitney Houston | Greatest artist of all time | 5th place | |
| Smooth Icons | 2022 | Whitney Houston | Greatest artist of all time | 4th place | |
| Smooth Icons | 2023 | Whitney Houston | Greatest artist of all time | 3rd place | |
| Smooth Icons | 2024 | Whitney Houston | Greatest artist of all time | 4th place | |
| Smooth Icons | 2025 | Whitney Houston | Greatest artist of all time | 4th place | |
| Smooth Icons | 2026 | Whitney Houston | Greatest artist of all time | 4th place | |
| Soul Train Lady of Soul Awards | 1996 | "Exhale (Shoop Shoop)" | Best R&B/Soul Single - Solo | Nominated | |
| Soul Train Lady of Soul Awards | 1996 | "Count On Me" | R&B/Soul Composer of the Year (shared with Babyface and Michael Houston) | Nominated | |
| Soul Train Lady of Soul Awards | 1999 | "Heartbreak Hotel" (with Faith Evans and Kelly Price) | Best R&B/Soul Single (Group, Band Or Duo) | Nominated | |
| Soul Train Lady of Soul Awards | 1999 | My Love Is Your Love | Best R&B/Soul Album Of the Year (Solo) | Nominated | |
| Soul Train Lady of Soul Awards | 2003 | Just Whitney | Best R&B/Soul Album of the Year (Solo) | Nominated | |
| Soul Train Music Awards | 1987 | Whitney Houston | Album of the Year, Female | Nominated | |
| Soul Train Music Awards | 1987 | "Greatest Love of All" | Best Single, Female | Nominated | |
| Soul Train Music Awards | 1988 | Whitney | Best Album of the Year, Female | Won | |
| Soul Train Music Awards | 1988 | "I Wanna Dance with Somebody (Who Loves Me)" | Best Music Video | Nominated | |
| Soul Train Music Awards | 1989 | "Where Do Broken Hearts Go" | Best R&B/Urban Contemporary Single, Female | Nominated | |
| Soul Train Music Awards | 1992 | I'm Your Baby Tonight | Best R&B/Soul Album, Female | Nominated | |
| Soul Train Music Awards | 1992 | "All the Man That I Need" | Best R&B/Soul Single, Female | Nominated | |
| Soul Train Music Awards | 1993 | "I Will Always Love You" | Best R&B/Soul Single, Female | Won | |
| Soul Train Music Awards | 1994 | "I Will Always Love You" | Best R&B Song of the Year | Won | |
| Soul Train Music Awards | 1994 | "I Have Nothing" | Best R&B/Soul Single, Female | Nominated | |
| Soul Train Music Awards | 1996 | "Exhale (Shoop Shoop)" | Best R&B/Soul Single, Female | Won | |
| Soul Train Music Awards | 1996 | "Exhale (Shoop Shoop)" | Best R&B/Soul or Rap Song of the Year | Nominated | |
| Soul Train Music Awards | 2000 | My Love Is Your Love | Best R&B/Soul Album - Female | Nominated | |
| Soul Train Music Awards | 2000 | "My Love Is Your Love" | Best R&B/Soul Single - Female | Nominated | |
| Soul Train Music Awards | 2001 | "Same Script, Different Cast" (with Deborah Cox) | Best R&B/Soul Single - Group, Band or Duo | Nominated | |
| Soul Train Music Awards | 2009 | Whitney Houston | Best R&B/Soul Artist - Female | Nominated | |
| Soul Train Music Awards | 2012 | "Celebrate" (Duet with Jordin Sparks) | Best Gospel/Inspirational Performance | Won | |
| Spotify Plaques | 2023 | "I Wanna Dance with Somebody (Who Loves Me)" | One Billion Streams Award | Won | |
| Spotify Plaques | 2024 | "Higher Love" | One Billion Streams Award | Won | |
| Stellar Awards | 1990 | "Celebrate New Life" (with BeBe & CeCe Winans) | Urban/Inspirational Single or the Performance of the Year | Won | |
| Teen Choice Awards | 1999 | "When You Believe" (with Mariah Carey) | Choice Music - Love Song | Nominated | |
| My VH1 Music Awards | 2000 | Whitney Houston vs. Honolulu Airport Security | Most Entertaining Public Feud | Nominated | |
| World Music Awards | 1994 | Whitney Houston | World's Best Selling American Recording Artist | Won | |
| World Music Awards | 1994 | Whitney Houston | Legend Award (World's Best Selling Female Recording Artist of the Era) | Won | |
| World Music Awards | 1994 | Whitney Houston | World's Best Selling Overall Recording Artist | Won | |
| World Music Awards | 1994 | Whitney Houston | World's Best Selling Pop Artist | Won | |
| World Music Awards | 1994 | Whitney Houston | World's Best Selling R&B Artist | Won | |
| Zamu Music Awards | 1994 | Whitney Houston | Best International Artist | Won | |
| Žebřík Music Awards | 1993 | Whitney Houston | Best International Female Singer | 6th place | |

== Other accolades ==
=== Induction honors ===
| Organization | Year | Honor | Work | Result | Ref |
|---|---|---|---|---|---|
| BET Honors | 2010 | BET Honors | —N/a | Inducted | |
| BET Walk of Fame | 1996 | BET Walk of Fame | —N/a | Inducted | (Note: Just the second inductee and first female inductee, Houston was honored for her pioneering achievements in music and film.) |
| East Orange Hall of Fame | 2017 | East Orange Hall of Fame | —N/a | Inducted | |
| Echo Prize | 2012 | ECHO Hall of Fame | —N/a | Inducted | |
| Georgia Music Hall of Fame | 2013 | Georgia Music Hall of Fame | —N/a | Inducted | |
| Goldmine Hall of Fame | 2012 | Goldmine Hall of Fame | —N/a | Inducted | |
| Gospel Music Hall of Fame Missouri | 2025 | Gospel Music Hall of Fame | —N/a | Inducted | |
| Grammy Hall of Fame | 2013 | Grammy Hall of Fame | Whitney Houston | Inducted | |
| Grammy Hall of Fame | 2018 | Grammy Hall of Fame | "I Will Always Love You" | Inducted | |
| HMV Harlem Walk of Fame | 2000 | HMV Harlem Walk of Fame | —N/a | Inducted | |
| Hollywood Walk of Fame | 1995 | Hollywood Walk of Fame | —N/a | Declined (Note: Houston refused a Hollywood star because she didn't want people stepping on her name.) | |
| National Recording Registry | 2020 | National Recording Registry | "I Will Always Love You" | Inducted | |
| National Rhythm & Blues Hall of Fame | 2014 | National Rhythm & Blues Hall of Fame | —N/a | Inducted | |
| New Jersey Hall of Fame | 2013 | New Jersey Hall of Fame | —N/a | Inducted | |
| New Jersey Walk of Fame | 2006 | New Jersey Walk of Fame | —N/a | Inducted | (Note: The New Jersey Walk of Fame honored the lives and achievements of extraordinary performing artists who are associated with the Garden State and/or its institutions.) |
| Nickelodeon Kids' Choice Awards | 1996 | Kids' Choice Hall of Fame | —N/a | Inducted | (Note: While Tim Allen was the only one to be presented with his Hall of Fame trophy, Houston was also inducted alongside other fellow celebrities Janet Jackson and Whoopi Goldberg.) |
| Online Film & Television Association Awards | 2022 | Film Hall of Fame: Songs | "I Will Always Love You" | Inducted | |
| Official Charts Pop Gem Hall of Fame | 2014 | Official Charts Company | "I Wanna Dance with Somebody (Who Loves Me)" | Inducted | |
| Rock and Roll Hall of Fame | 2020 | Rock and Roll Hall of Fame | —N/a | Inducted | |
| Songwriters Hall of Fame | 1990 | Howie Richmond Hitmaker Award | —N/a | Inducted | |
| Soul Train 25th Anniversary Hall of Fame | 1995 | Soul Train 25th Anniversary Hall of Fame | —N/a | Inducted | |

=== Lifetime honors ===
Name of the honor, year the honor was awarded, category and type of honor
| Honor | Year (Note: Indicates the year of ceremony. Each year is linked to the article about the awards held that year, wherever possible.) | Category | Type | Ref. |
|---|---|---|---|---|
| American Music Awards | 1994 | Award of Merit | Honoree | |
| American Music Awards | 2009 | International Artist Award of Excellence | Honoree | |
| Barbados Music Awards | 2013 | International Icon Award | Honoree | |
| BET Awards | 2001 | BET Lifetime Achievement Award | Honoree | |
| Billboard Music Awards | 2012 | Billboard Millennium Award | Honoree | |
| CCTV-MTV Music Honors | 2003 | International Outstanding Achievement | Honoree | |
| Dove Awards (The Gospel Music Association) | 1997 | Outstanding Mainstream Contribution to Gospel Music | Honoree | |
| Essence Awards | 1990 | The Essence Award for the Performing Arts | Honoree | |
| Grammy Awards | 2026 | Grammy Lifetime Achievement Award | Honoree | |
| International Achievement in Arts Awards | 1995 | Distinguished Achievement in Music and Film/Video | Honoree | |
| MTV Europe Music Awards | 2012 | Global Icon | Honoree | |
| MTV Japan Awards | 2004 | International Outstanding Achievement | Honoree | |
| Soul Train Music Awards | 1998 | Quincy Jones Award for Career Achievement | Honoree | |
| Soul Train Music Awards | 2000 | Artist of the Decade (Female) (Note: For extraordinary artistic contributions during the 1990s.) | Honoree | |
| Trumpet Awards | 1998 | The Pinnacle Award (Note: Trumpet Awards — the awards are intended to honor blacks who, through consistency and longevity, have inspired others and have achieved success in their chosen professions or careers.) | Honoree | |

=== Philanthropy honors ===
Name of the honor, year the honor was awarded, category and type of honor
| Honor | Year | Category | Type | Ref. |
|---|---|---|---|---|
| Carousel of Hope Ball (The Children's Diabetes Foundation) | 1992 | Brass Ring Award | Honoree | |
| Carousel of Hope Ball (The Children's Diabetes Foundation) | 1996 | The Davises' High Hopes Award | Honoree | |
| Deirdre O’Brien Child Advocacy Center | 1999 | Child Advocate of the Year | Honoree (Note: The Whitney Houston Foundation for Children contributed $40,000 for the construction of a medical examination room at the center, equipped with the latest forensic medical equipment to assist investigations of alleged child sexual abuse.) | |
| Essence Awards | 1997 | The Triumphant Spirit Award | Honoree | |
| National Urban Coalition | 1988 | Distinguished Artist/Humanitarian Award | Honoree (Note: Houston earned the award for charitable acts including a public service announcement urging minority youth to study science and math, and participation on an Arista Records charity album whose proceeds went to the United Negro College Fund.) | |
| Presidential awards | 1990 | Points of Light Contributing Leader | Honoree | |
| United Negro College Fund | 1990 | The Frederick D. Patterson Award | Honoree (Note: Houston was honored for her long-standing dedication to Black higher education.) | |
| VH1 Honors | 1995 | Humanitarian Award | Honoree (Note: Houston earned the award for her charitable works with the Whitney Houston Foundation for Children, Inc.) | |
| Women's World Awards | 2004 | World Arts Award for Lifetime Achievement (Note: Shared with Dionne Warwick.) | Honoree | |

=== Yearly honors ===
Name of the honor, year the honor was awarded, category and type of honor
| Honor | Year | Category | Type | Ref. |
|---|---|---|---|---|
| American Black Achievement Awards | 1988 | The Music Award | Honoree (Note: While Gladys Knight & The Pips were named the winners, both Houston and Michael Jackson won the Music Award as honorees as opposed to 1986 when Houston was just nominated.) | |
| American Cinema Awards | 1991 | Musical Performer of the Year | Honoree | |
| NABOB Communications Awards Dinner (The National Association of Black Owned Broadcasters) | 1994 | Entertainer of the Year | Honoree | |
| Soul Train Music Awards | 1994 | Sammy Davis Jr. Entertainer of the Year | Honoree | |

=== Guinness World Records ===
As of 2026, Houston has acquired 33 entries in the Guinness World Records.

Key
| † | Indicates a former world-record holder |

Year the record was awarded, title of the record, and the record holder
| Year | Record | Record holder | Ref. |
|---|---|---|---|
| 1987 | † Best-selling album by a woman | Whitney Houston (Note: Houston held the record for best-selling album by a woman with her 1985 debut album, Whitney Houston, until 1992, when Madonna's True Blue, replaced it. The title was soon reclaimed by Houston with her 1992 soundtrack to the film The Bodyguard.) | |
| 1987 | † Best-selling debut album of all time | Whitney Houston (Note: Houston would hold this record until it was replaced by Boston's 1977 debut album. The album remains the best-selling debut album of all time in the United States by a solo artist, shared with singers Britney Spears's ...Baby One More Time album and Meat Loaf's Bat Out of Hell. Globally, both Houston's and Spears' debuts share the record of best-selling debut album of all time by a female artist at 25 million copies sold worldwide each.) | |
| 1992 | † Most number one singles by a female artist | Whitney Houston (Note: Madonna eventually broke the record. Since then, Mariah Carey has claimed this record.) | |
| 1994 | † Most weeks at number one on the Billboard Hot 100 | "I Will Always Love You" (Note: Houston's single "I Will Always Love You" held the record for most weeks at number one on the Billboard Hot 100 until the release of "One Sweet Day" in 1995.) | |
| 1994 | † Most Billboard Music Award wins in one night | Whitney Houston (Note: Houston held this record until 2012 when Adele won 12 awards for her album, 21. The record has since been claimed by Drake.) | |
| 1997 | † Best-selling 1990s UK single by a female soloist (Note: Cher holds this record with "Believe".) | "I Will Always Love You" | |
| 1998 | Most successful star couple | Whitney Houston and Bobby Brown | |
| 1999 | Most consecutive US No. 1 singles | Whitney Houston (Note: Between October 1985 and April 1988, Houston landed seven consecutive number one singles in a row: "Saving All My Love for You", "How Will I Know", "Greatest Love of All", "I Wanna Dance with Somebody (Who Loves Me)", "Didn't We Almost Have It All", "So Emotional" and "Where Do Broken Hearts Go".) | |
| 1999 | Biggest-selling R&B album by a female artist in the US | Whitney Houston | |
| 1999 | Biggest-selling R&B single by a female artist in the UK | "I Will Always Love You" | |
| 2006 | † Most consecutive weeks at No. 1 on the UK singles chart (solo female) | "I Will Always Love You" (Note: "Dance Monkey" by Tones and I currently holds the record.) | |
| 2006 | Most consecutive weeks at No. 1 on the US singles chart (solo female) | "I Will Always Love You" (Note: "I Will Always Love You" maintains its chart record for a female artist with 14.) | |
| 2006 | Most cumulative weeks at No. 1 on the US singles chart (solo female, individual single) | "I Will Always Love You" (Note: Houston shares this record with Mariah Carey, whose single, "We Belong Together", also reached 14 cumulative weeks.) | |
| 2012 | Most simultaneous UK chart entries by a female artist (Note: Houston had more than 12 entries inside the UK Top 75 simultaneously just weeks following her death in 2012.) | Whitney Houston | |
| 2012 | First female artist to debut at number one on the US Billboard 200 | Whitney Houston (Note: Houston accomplished this back in 1987 when her album, Whitney, debuted at the top of the Billboard 200.) | |
| 2012 | First female artist to enter number one on the US and UK albums chart simultaneously (Note: Houston also accomplished this back in 1987 when the album, Whitney, debuted at the top of the OCC UK albums chart and Billboard 200 in its first weeks of retail.) | Whitney Houston | |
| 2012 | † Most awarded female American Music Awards winner | Whitney Houston (Note: Houston would hold this record until 2020 when it was broken by Taylor Swift.) | |
| 2012 | Most American Music Awards wins in a single night by a female artist | Whitney Houston (Note: Houston won eight trophies at the 1994 ceremony, the only other artist to do so was Michael Jackson in 1984.) | |
| 2012 | † Most cumulative weeks at number one on the US Billboard 200 (solo female) | Whitney Houston (46) (Note: The record for most cumulative weeks was set at 46 by Houston, since then, Taylor Swift has broken this record.) | |
| 2012 | † Most simultaneous albums on the US Billboard 200 (solo female) | Whitney Houston (10) (Note: Taylor Swift holds the record with 11.) | |
| 2012 | Most number one remakes on the US Billboard Hot 100 | Whitney Houston (Note: Houston had four number one covers: "Saving All My Love for You", "Greatest Love of All", "All the Man That I Need" and "I Will Always Love You".) | |
| 2012 | Most number one "triple crown" No. 1 US singles | Whitney Houston (Note: Houston had four number one singles simultaneously hit number one on the pop, R&B and adult contemporary charts on the US Billboard chart and currently shares this record with Lionel Richie, who also had four.) | |
| 2012 | Biggest-selling soundtrack album | The Bodyguard (Note: The Bodyguard continues to hold this record, selling more than 45 million copies.) | |
| 2012 | Best-selling single by a female artist (US) | "I Will Always Love You" (Note: Since its release, the single has sold more than 4.5 million units alone in the country.) | |
| 2012 | † Fastest-selling pre-digital single by an artist (US) | "I Will Always Love You" (Note: "I Will Always Love You" held the record after shifting 632,000 singles in January 1993; Elton John's "Candle in the Wind '97" later surpassed it in January 1998.) | |
| 2012 | Fastest-selling pre-digital single by a female artist (US) | "I Will Always Love You" (Note: "I Will Always Love You" holds the record for a female artist.) | |
| 2012 | First album to sell a million copies in a single week | The Bodyguard (Note: It sold 1.06 million copies in its sixth week of release on January 16, 1993.) | |
| 2012 | First recipient of the BET Lifetime Achievement Award | Whitney Houston (Note: Houston received the award in 2001 and remains at 37, the youngest recipient of the honor.) | |
| 2012 | Highest trending Google search of 2012 | Whitney Houston | |
| 2012 | Most World Music Awards wins in a single night | Whitney Houston (Note: Shares this with Michael Jackson.) | |
| 2015 | Best-selling album by a woman | The Bodyguard | |
| 2023 | Highest-earning dead celebrity (female, current) | Whitney Houston | |
| 2025 | Best-selling physical single by a female solo artist | "I Will Always Love You" | |

=== Listicles ===
Name of publisher, name of listicle, year(s) listed, and placement result
| Publisher | Listicle | Year(s) | Result | Ref. |
|---|---|---|---|---|
| ABC | 30 Greatest Women in Music | 2013 | 1 | |
| ARC | Top Pop Artists of the Past 25 Years | 2004 | 4 | |
| American Dental Hygienists' Association | America's Greatest Smiles | 1988 | Placed | |
| American Express Essentials | The 50 Greatest Pop Stars Turned Movie Stars | 2020 | 10 | |
| American Film Institute | AFI's 100 Years... 100 Songs | 2004 | 65 ("I Will Always Love You") | |
| American Songwriter | The Most Iconic Songs of the 1980s | 2023 | 1 ("I Wanna Dance with Somebody (Who Loves Me)") | |
| The A.V. Club | The 30 Greatest National Anthem Performances of All Time, Ranked | 2023 | 1 (The performance of "The Star Spangled Banner" at Super Bowl XXV) | |
| The A.V. Club | The Best Movie Soundtracks of All Time, Ranked | 2023 | 12 (The Bodyguard) | |
| Billboard | Rookie of the Year | 1985 | 1 | |
| Billboard | The Greatest Pop Star By Year (1981–2023) | 1986 | 1 | |
| Billboard | The Greatest Pop Star By Year (1981–2023) | 1987 | Honorable mention | |
| Billboard | The Greatest Pop Star By Year (1981–2023) | 1992 | Honorable mention | |
| Billboard | The Greatest Pop Star By Year (1981–2023) | 1993 | Honorable mention | |
| Billboard | Top Pop Artists of the '90s | 1999 | 8 | |
| Billboard | Top Pop Artists of the Year | 1999 | 9 | |
| Billboard | Greatest of All Time Billboard 200 Women Artists | 2017 | 4 | |
| Billboard | Greatest of All Time Hot 100 Artists | 2018 | 9 | |
| Billboard | The 98 Greatest Songs of 1998 | 2018 | 63 ("When You Believe" w/Mariah Carey) | |
| Billboard | The 99 Greatest Songs of 1999 | 2019 | 22 ("It's Not Right but It's Okay") | |
| Billboard | Greatest of All Time Dance Club Artists | 2016 | 13 | |
| Billboard | Greatest of All Time Adult Contemporary Artists | 2023 | 15 | |
| Billboard | Top 50 R&B Artists of the Past 25 Years | 2010 | 3 | |
| Billboard | 35 Greatest R&B Artists of All Time | 2015 | 9 | |
| Billboard | 110 Greatest Musical Moments | 2004 | Placed (The success of Whitney Houston in 1985–86) | |
| Billboard | 20 Best Love Songs by Real-Life Couples | 2014 | 13 ("Something in Common" ft. Bobby Brown) | |
| Billboard | The 100 Greatest Award Show Performances of All Time | 2017 | 37 ("How Will I Know" at the 1986 MTV Video Music Awards) | |
| Billboard | The 100 Greatest Award Show Performances of All Time | 2017 | 81 ("I Have Nothing" at the 1993 Billboard Music Awards) | |
| Billboard | The 20 Best American Music Awards Performances Ever | 2017 | 7 ("1994 Medley") | |
| Billboard | The 15 Greatest Billboard Music Awards Performances Ever | 2020 | 2 ("I Have Nothing", 1993) | |
| Billboard | Greatest Songs of All Time Hot 100 Songs | 2021 | 60 ("I Will Always Love You") | |
| Billboard | Greatest of All Time Songs of the Summer | 2021 | 104 ("I Wanna Dance with Somebody (Who Loves Me)" | |
| Billboard | Greatest of All Time Holiday 100 Songs | 2021 | 85 ("Do You Hear What I Hear") | |
| Billboard | Top 11 Super Bowl National Anthem Performances | 2023 | 1 (The performance of "The Star Spangled Banner" at Super Bowl XXV) | |
| Billboard | 500 Best Pop Songs of All Time | 2023 | 1 ("I Wanna Dance with Somebody (Who Loves Me)" | |
| Billboard | 500 Best Pop Songs of All Time | 2023 | 60 ("I Will Always Love You") | |
| Billboard | 500 Best Pop Songs of All Time | 2023 | 229 ("How Will I Know") | |
| Billboard | 100 Best Breakup Songs of All Time | 2025 | 6 ("I Have Nothing") | |
| Billboard | The Top 50 Best R&B Love Songs of All Time | 2025 | 5 ("I Will Always Love You") | |
| Billboard | The Top 100 Women Artists of the 21st Century | 2025 | 69 | |
| Billboard | The 100 Best Dance Songs of All Time | 2025 | 72 ("It's Not Right but It's Okay (Thunderpuss Remix)") | |
| Billboard | 100 Best LGBTQ Anthems of All Time: Queer Pride Songs | 2025 | 45 ("It's Not Right but It's Okay (Thunderpuss Remix)") | |
| Billboard | 75 Best R&B Artists of All Time | 2025 | 5 | |
| Billboard | The 100 Most Iconic Pop Star Memes of All Time | 2025 | 51 ("Whitney Houston and Natalie Cole pointing at each other") | |
| Billboard | The 100 Most Iconic Pop Star Memes of All Time | 2025 | 73 ("Whitney Houston BET Awards Thanks") | |
| British Hit Singles and Albums | Top 100 Most Successful Artists | 2005 | 40 | |
| CBS News | The Essential American Songbook | 2026 | "I Will Always Love You" | |
| CBS News | The Essential American Songbook | 2026 | "The Star Spangled Banner" | |
| CBS Sports NFL | Super Bowl all-time national anthems | 2012 | 1 (The performance of "The Star Spangled Banner" at Super Bowl XXV) | |
| Complex | The 100 Hottest Female Singers of All Time | 2012 | 51 | |
| Consequence of Sound | The 100 Greatest Singers of All Time | 2016 | 6 | |
| Consequence of Sound | The 100 Best Tours of All Time | 2025 | 46 (Moment of Truth World Tour) | |
| Consequence of Sound | The 100 Best Vocalists of All Time | 2026 | 3 | |
| Cosmopolitan | 82 Best '90s Love Songs | 2022 | 1 ("I Will Always Love You") | |
| Cosmopolitan | 82 Best '90s Love Songs | 2022 | 15 ("My Love Is Your Love") | |
| Cosmopolitan | 53 Best Movie Soundtracks of All Time | 2023 | 38 (The Bodyguard) | |
| Cosmopolitan | 53 Best Movie Soundtracks of All Time | 2023 | 48 (Waiting to Exhale) | |
| Ebony | Top 5 Super Bowl National Anthem Performances | 2023 | 1 (The performance of "The Star Spangled Banner" at Super Bowl XXV) | |
| Entertainment Weekly | Entertainers of the Year | 1993 | 5 | |
| Entertainment Weekly | The best LGBTQ anthems of all time | 2018 | 11 ("How Will I Know") | |
| Esquire | The 40 Best Wedding Reception Songs of All Time | 2023 | 1 ("I Wanna Dance With Somebody (Who Loves Me)" | |
| Esquire | 25 Most American Songs of All Time | 2026 | Placed ("I Will Always Love You"( | |
| Essence | 50 Most Influential R&B Stars | 2020 | 5 | |
| Essence | The 10 Best R&B Soloists Of All Time | 2022 | 1 | |
| Essence | 66 Boundary-Breaking Black Women Who Have Paved the Way | 2023 | 10 (Note: Houston is the highest ranked musician on the list.) | |
| Essence | 50 Greatest R&B Songs of All Time | 2026 | 3 ("I Have Nothing") | |
| Forbes | Greatest 1980s songs | 2024 | 15 ("I Wanna Dance With Somebody (Who Loves Me)") | |
| Forbes | Greatest 1990s songs | 2024 | 1 ("I Will Always Love You") | |
| Forbes | Greatest 1980s artists | 2024 | 14 | |
| Forbes | Greatest 1990s artists | 2024 | 8 | |
| Forbes | 50 Black Female Singers With Incredible Vocals | 2025 | 1 | |
| Forbes | 30 Most Notable Female Singers of the '80s | 2025 | 1 | |
| Forbes | 30 Most Notable Female Singers of the '90s | 2025 | 3 | |
| Forbes Top 40 | Highest earning entertainers | 1987 | 8 | |
| Forbes Top 40 | Highest earning entertainers | 1988 | 17 | |
| Forbes Top 40 | Highest earning entertainers | 1994 | 23 | |
| Forbes Highest-Paid Dead Celebrities | Highest-paid dead celebrities | 2019 | 12 | |
| Forbes Highest-Paid Dead Celebrities | Highest-paid dead celebrities | 2023 | 7 | |
| Forbes Highest-Paid Dead Celebrities | Highest-paid dead celebrities | 2024 | 13 | |
| Google | Most Googled Person of 2012 | 2012 | 1 | |
| Harper's Bazaar | Ten Most Beautiful Women in America | 1986 | Placed | |
| Harris Interactive | Favorite Singer/Musician or Musical Group | 1994 | 1 | |
| Harris Interactive | Favorite Singer/Musician or Musical Group | 1995 | 5 | |
| Harris Interactive | Favorite Singer/Musician or Musical Group | 1996 | 3 | |
| Harris Interactive | Favorite Singer/Musician or Musical Group | 1997 | 3 (Note: Tied with Frank Sinatra.) | |
| Harris Interactive | Most Popular Love Song | 2013 | 1 ("I Will Always Love You") | |
| The Independent | 50 women who broke barriers in the music industry | 2020 | Placed | |
| The Independent | The 40 Greatest Film Soundtracks | 2023 | 35 (The Bodyguard) | |
| The Mirror | Greatest Love Songs of All Time | 2022 | 1 ("I Will Always Love You") | |
| MTV | 100 Greatest Songs of the '90s | 2007 | 4 ("I Will Always Love You") | |
| New York Post | The 10 Best Super Bowl National Anthem Performances of All Time | 2023 | 1 (The performance of "The Star Spangled Banner" at Super Bowl XXV) | |
| Next Luxury | 20 of the Most Popular Female Singers Ever | 2022 | Placed | |
| NME | NME Greatest No. 1 Singles in History | 2012 | 8 ("I Will Always Love You") | |
| NPR | 150 Greatest Albums Made by Women | 2017 | 14 (Whitney Houston) | |
| Parade | 15 Best Super Bowl National Anthem Performances of All Time | 2024 | 1 (The performance of "The Star Spangled Banner" at Super Bowl XXV) | |
| People | People Readers Poll | 1986 | 1 (America's Top New Star) | |
| People | 25 Most Intriguing People of the Year | 1986 | Placed | |
| People | 50 Most Beautiful People | 1991 | Placed | |
| People | 50 Most Beautiful People | 1993 | Placed | |
| People | 25 Most Intriguing People of the Year | 1994 | Placed | |
| People | 25 Musical Moments of the Last 25 Years | 2007 | Placed (Houston's entry into the music business in 1985) | |
| Pitchfork | The 200 Best Songs of the 1980s | 2015 | 20 ("I Wanna Dance with Somebody (Who Loves Me)") | |
| Pitchfork | The 200 Best Songs of the 1980s | 2015 | 103 ("How Will I Know") | |
| Pitchfork | The 200 Best Albums of the 1980s | 2018 | 117 (Whitney Houston) | |
| Pitchfork | The 150 Best Albums of the 1990s | 2022 | 147 (The Bodyguard) | |
| Pitchfork | The 250 Best Songs of the 1990s | 2022 | 59 ("I Will Always Love You") | |
| Pitchfork | The 250 Best Songs of the 1990s | 2022 | 211 ("I'm Every Woman") | |
| Q | 100 Women Who Rock the World | 2002 | 71 (Whitney Houston) | |
| Reuters | Century's Best Female Singer | 1999 | 3 (Note: Behind only Barbra Streisand and Celine Dion.) | |
| The Ringer | The 50 Greatest Breakup Songs of All Time | 2020 | 4 ("I Will Always Love You") | |
| The Ringer | The 50 Best Movie Soundtracks of the Past 50 Years | 2021 | 7 (The Bodyguard) | |
| Rock and Roll Hall of Fame | The Definitive 200 | 2007 | 46 (Whitney Houston) | |
| Rolling Stone | 25 Most Memorable Music Moments in NFL History | 2003 | 1 (The performance of "The Star Spangled Banner" at Super Bowl XXV) | |
| Rolling Stone | 100 Greatest Songs of the '90s | 2007 | 4 ("I Will Always Love You") | |
| Rolling Stone | 20 Biggest Songs of the Summer: The 1980s | 2019 | 8 ("I Wanna Dance with Somebody (Who Loves Me)") | |
| Rolling Stone | 50 Best Songs of the Nineties | 2019 | 19 ("Heartbreak Hotel" ft. Faith Evans and Kelly Price) | |
| Rolling Stone | 500 Greatest Albums of All Time | 2021 | 249 (Whitney Houston) | |
| Rolling Stone | 500 Greatest Songs of All Time | 2021 | 94 ("I Will Always Love You") | |
| Rolling Stone | 500 Greatest Songs of All Time | 2021 | 231 ("I Wanna Dance with Somebody (Who Loves Me)" | |
| Rolling Stone | 100 Best Debut Albums of All Time | 2022 | 89 (Whitney Houston) | |
| Rolling Stone | 200 Greatest Dance Songs of All Time | 2022 | 75 ("It's Not Right, But It's OK (Thunderpuss Club Mix)") | |
| Rolling Stone | 200 Greatest Singers of All Time | 2023 | 2 | |
| Rolling Stone | The 30 Greatest Grammy Performances Ever | 2023 | 12 (The performance of "I Will Always Love You") | |
| Rolling Stone | The 20 Most Memorable Super Bowl National Anthems | 2023 | 1 (The 1991 performance at Super Bowl XXV) | |
| Rolling Stone | The 200 Best '80s Songs: Top Tunes from the '80s | 2023 | 6 ("How Will I Know") | |
| Rolling Stone | The 101 Greatest Soundtracks of All Time | 2024 | 101 (The Bodyguard) | |
| Rolling Stone | The 30 Most Memorable Super Bowl National Anthems | 2025 | 1 (The 1991 performance at Super Bowl XXV) | |
| Rotten Tomatoes | 100 Best Christmas Movies of All Time | 2023 | 96 (The Preacher's Wife) | |
| Screen Rant | 10 Songs That Completely Define the 1980s | 2025 | 7 ("I Wanna Dance with Somebody (Who Loves Me)") | |
| Screen Rant | 10 Pop Songs That Completely Define The Genre | 2025 | 1 ("I Wanna Dance with Somebody (Who Loves Me)") | |
| Slant Magazine | 100 Greatest Dance Songs | 2020 | 58 ("I Wanna Dance with Somebody (Who Loves Me)") | |
| Smooth Radio | The 30 best female singers of all time | 2023 | 1 | |
| Smooth Radio | The 20 greatest Super Bowl National Anthem performances | 2024 | 1 (The performance of "The Star Spangled Banner" at Super Bowl XXV) | |
| Smooth Radio | The Greatest Oscars Music Performances of All Time | 2024 | 2 ("When You Believe" w/Mariah Carey) | |
| Songs of the Century | "I Will Always Love You" | 2001 | 108 | |
| Stylist | 50 Female Pop Pioneers | 2021 | Placed | |
| The Telegraph | Pop's 20 Greatest Female Artists | 2015 | 15 | |
| The Top 500 Songs of the Rock Era: 1955-2015 | "I Will Always Love You" | 2015 | 1 | |
| The Top 500 Songs of the Rock Era: 1955-2015 | "Greatest Love of All" | 2015 | 144 | |
| The Top 500 Songs of the Rock Era: 1955-2015 | "I Wanna Dance with Somebody (Who Loves Me)" | 2015 | 179 | |
| The Top 500 Songs of the Rock Era: 1955-2015 | "How Will I Know" | 2015 | 188 | |
| The Top 500 Songs of the Rock Era: 1955-2015 | "I Have Nothing" | 2015 | 234 | |
| The Top 500 Songs of the Rock Era: 1955-2015 | "I'm Every Woman" | 2015 | 384 | |
| Time | Black History: 50 Cultural Giants | 2012 | Placed | |
| Time | The 30 Best Breakup Songs of All Time | 2024 | "I Will Always Love You" | |
| uDiscover Music | Best New Jack Swing Songs: 40 Party-Starting Jams | 2024 | 25 ("I'm Your Baby Tonight") | |
| Variety | Best Christmas Movies of All Time | 2023 | Placed (The Preacher's Wife) | |
| Vogue | The 127 Best Met Gala Looks of All Time | 2026 | Placed (1999 Met Gala) | |
| VH1 | 100 Greatest Women in Rock & Roll | 1999 | 61 | |
| VH1 | 100 Greatest Pop Songs | 2000 | 40 ("I Will Always Love You") | |
| VH1 | 100 Greatest Rock & Roll Moments on TV | 2000 | 59 (The performance of "The Star Spangled Banner" at Super Bowl XXV) | |
| VH1 | 100 Greatest Dance Songs | 2000 | 86 ("I Wanna Dance With Somebody (Who Loves Me)") | |
| VH1 | 100 Sexiest Artists | 2002 | 24 | |
| VH1 | 100 Greatest Women in Music | 2002 | 4 | |
| VH1 | 100 Greatest Moments That Rocked TV | 2003 | 12 (The performance of "The Star Spangled Banner" at Super Bowl XXV) | |
| VH1 | 100 Greatest Love Songs | 2003 | 1 ("I Will Always Love You") | |
| VH1 | 50 Greatest Women of the Video Era | 2003 | 3 | |
| VH1 | 100 Best Songs of the Past 25 Years | 2003 | 8 ("I Will Always Love You") | |
| VH1 | 200 Greatest Pop Culture Icons | 2003 | 116 | |
| VH1 | 25 Greatest Rock Star Cameos | 2003 | 13 (Whitney on Silver Spoons in 1985) | |
| VH1 | 100 Greatest Songs of the '80s | 2006 | 12 ("How Will I Know") | |
| VH1 | 100 Greatest Songs of the '90s | 2007 | 4 ("I Will Always Love You") | |
| VH1 | 100 Greatest Artists of All Time | 2010 | 60 | |
| VH1 | 100 Greatest Women In Music | 2012 | 6 | |
| VH1 | 40 Greatest R&B Songs of the '90s | 2012 | 3 ("I Will Always Love You") | |
| VH1 | 40 Greatest R&B Songs of the '90s | 2012 | 24 ("I'm Every Woman") | |
| Vibe | The Best R&B Duets Of The 21st Century | 2025 | 12 ("Same Script, Different Cast" ft. Deborah Cox) | |
| The Week | The best singers turned actors of all time | 2025 | Placed | |

=== State honors ===
Name of country, year given, and name of honor
| Country | Year | Honor | Ref. |
|---|---|---|---|
| United States | 1986 | Key to the city of Newark | |
| United States | 1991 | American Red Cross Board of Governors (Note: Houston became a temporary member after donating proceeds of her recording of "The Star Spangled Banner" to the American Red Cross Gulf Crisis for families of troops who served at the first Gulf War.) | |
| United States | 1991 | NFL Pro-Set Card (Note: Whitney became the first and only pop star to be given an NFL Pro-Set Card following her performance of "The Star Spangled Banner" at Super Bowl XXV in 1991.) | |
| United States | 1997 | Franklin Elementary School (renamed to the Whitney E. Houston Academy of Creative and Performing Arts) | |
| United States | 2012 | New Jersey Flags Flown at Half-Staff (in honor of Whitney Houston following her untimely death) | |
| United States | 2013 | Madame Tussauds (four different statues of the singer were presented in Las Vegas, Hollywood, New York and Washington D.C.) | |
| United States | 2016 | National Museum of African American History and Culture (Musical Crossroads Exhibit) | |
| United States | 2019 | National Museum of African American Music (Exhibit) | |
| United States | 2023 | Vaxhaul Service Area (renamed to the Whitney Houston Service Area at mile 142 of the Garden State Parkway North, in Union) | |
| Georgia | 2019 | Statue of likeness at the Musician's Park at the Black Sea Arena in Kobuleti | |

=== Honorary degree ===
Name of school, year given, and name of degree
| School | Year | Degree | Ref. |
|---|---|---|---|
| Grambling State University | 1988 | Honorary Doctorate of Humane Letters (Note: She received the honorary doctorate degree for her contribution to the arts through music.) | |

=== Vevo-certified videos ===
| Year | Nominee/Work | Certified videos | Ref. |
|---|---|---|---|
| 2025 | Whitney Houston | 15 | |
As of November 15, 2025

== See also ==
- List of accolades received by The Bodyguard (soundtrack)
- List of Whitney Houston records and achievements
