= Soul Train Music Award for Heritage Award – Career Achievement =

Annual US music award

This page lists the winners and nominees for the Soul Train Music Heritage Award for Career Achievement, awarded from 1987 to 1997. The award was later retitled in 1998 to the Quincy Jones Award for Career Achievement.

== Winners ==
Winners are listed first and highlighted in bold.

=== 1980s ===
Year	Artist	Ref
1987
1987	**Stevie Wonder**	
1988
1988	**Gladys Knight & the Pips**	
1989
1989	**Michael Jackson**	

=== 1990s ===
Year	Artist	Ref
1990
1990	Quincy Jones	
1991
1991	Smokey Robinson	
1992
1992	Prince	
1993
1993	Eddie Murphy	
1994
1994	Barry White	
1995
1995	Diana Ross	
1996
1996	Patti LaBelle	
1997
1997	Curtis Mayfield	

== See also ==
- Soul Train Music Award for Quincy Jones Award for Career Achievement
