= The Greatest (VH1 TV series) =

Music television series

The Greatest is a television series broadcast on VH1. Each episode counts down either songs, albums, music videos, moments, musicians, or celebrities of a particular category.

== Episodes ==
Number	Title	Premiere date
271	40 Greatest Pranks 4	2014-03-05
269	40 Funniest Fails 3	2014-01-09
267	40 Greatest Love & Hip Hop Moments	2013-10-21
265	40 Greatest Viral Videos	2013-09-14
260	100 Sexiest Artists (2013)	2013-03-05
258	40 Greatest Hip-Hop Songs of the 90s	2012-12-19
253	100 Greatest Kid Stars 2	2012-11-29
251	40 Greatest R&B Songs of the 90s	2012-06-25
249	40 Greatest Yo! MTV Raps Moments	2012-04-16
247	40 Greatest Feuds 2	2012-03-21
242	100 Greatest Women In Music	2012-02-13
240	40 Greatest TRL Moments	2012-02-02
238	40 Funniest Fails 2	2011-12-28
236	40 Winningest Winners of 2011	2011-11-25
231	100 Greatest Songs of the 00s	2011-10-03
229	40 Champions Of Cute	2011-09-24
227	40 Most Shocking Hip Hop Moments	2011-09-18
225	40 Greatest One Hit Wonders of the 90s	2011-04-03
223	40 Greatest Pranks 3	2011-03-27
221	40 Greatest Fails	2011-03-20
219	40 Most Shocking Celebrity Breakups	2011-03-13
214	100 Greatest Artists of All Time	2010-09-06
212	40 Most Slimmed Down Celebs	2010-02-03
207	100 Most Shocking Music Moments	2009-12-28
202	40 Naughtiest Celebrity Scandals	2009-04-09
200	100 Greatest One Hit Wonders of the 80s	2009-03-31
198	40 Greatest Celebrity Divorces	2009-02-14
196	40 Greatest Pranks 2	2009-01-07
191	100 Greatest Hard Rock Songs	2008-12-29
186	100 Greatest Hip Hop Songs	2008-09-29
185	20 Greatest Celebreality Fights	2008-06-02
183	40 Hottiest Hotties Of The 90s	2008-04-15
178	100 Greatest Songs Of The 90s	2007-12-17
176	40 Greatest Reality TV Moments 2	2007-08-10
174	40 Most Softsational Soft-Rock Songs	2007-06-01
172	Web Junk Presents: 40 Greatest Internet Superstars	2007-03-23
167	100 Greatest Songs Of The 80s	2006-10-30
163	40 Dumbest Celebrity Quotes Ever	2006-10-06
159	40 Greatest Metal Songs	2006-05-01
157	40 More Awesomely Bad Fashion Moments	2006-04-01
156	20 Celebreality Moments	2006-03-13
151	100 Greatest Teen Stars	2006-02-06
138	100 Greatest Kid Stars	2005-06-13
136	40 Least Hip Hop Moments	2005-04-30
134	40 Hottest Rock Star Girlfriends...and Wives	2005-04-01
129	100 Most Wanted Bodies	2005-03-07
127	40 Most Shocking Hair Moments	2005-03-07
120	100 Greatest Red Carpet Moments	2004-11-01
115	100 Most Metal Moments	2004-05-31
095	200 Greatest Pop Culture Icons	2003-07-23
090	100 Most Outrageous Celebrity Moments	2004-04-05
088	50 Greatest Album Covers	2003-07-13
080	50 Greatest Teen Idols	2003-06-27
075	100 Greatest Songs from the Past 25 Years	2003-06-16
073	25 Greatest Power Ballads	2003-05-23
071	50 Greatest Women of the Video Era	2003-05-16
070	Top 25 Greatest Videos To Get Busy To	2003-05-09
068	50 Greatest Hip Hop Artists	2003-04-18
066	50 Sexiest Video Moments	2003-03-12
061	100 Greatest Moments That Rocked TV	2003-01-13
056	100 Greatest Artists of Rock & Roll	1998-07-23
051	100 Greatest Shocking Moments in Rock & Roll	2001-05-21
046	100 Greatest Videos	2001-02-05
041B	100 Greatest Albums (UK)	2001-11-22
041	100 Greatest Albums of Rock & Roll	2001-02-17
036	100 Greatest Artists of Hard Rock	2000-11-13
031	100 Greatest Rock & Roll Moments on TV	2000-25-07
026	100 Greatest One Hit Wonders	2002-05-06
021	100 Greatest Dance Songs	2000-09-14
016B	100 Greatest Women of Music (UK)	2002-09-30
016	100 Greatest Women of Rock & Roll	1999-07-26
011	100 Greatest Rock & Roll Songs	2000-03-19
006	100 Greatest Love Songs	2003-02-11
001	100 Sexiest Artists (2002)	2002-09-23
