= Billboard Millennium Award =

American music award

- Awarded for: Outstanding achievements and influence in the music industry
- Country: United States
- Presented by: Billboard
- First award: 2011
- Final award: 2016
- Most recent winner(s): Britney Spears

The Billboard Millennium Award is an award from the Billboard Music Awards that originated in 2011 to periodically recognize singers of great impact and influence in the music industry.

== Recipients ==
Year	Image	Recipient	Performance	Ref.
2011		Beyoncé	"Run the World (Girls)"	
2012		Whitney Houston	Presented by Whoopi Goldberg. Tribute to Whitney Houston "The Greatest Love of All" and "I Will Always Love You", performed by John Legend and Jordin Sparks. Award accepted by her daughter, Bobbi Kristina Brown and Pat Houston	
2016		Britney Spears	"Work Bitch", "Womanizer", "I Love Rock 'n' Roll", "Breathe on Me", "I'm a Slave 4 U", "Touch of My Hand", and "Toxic"	

== See also ==
- Billboard Spotlight Award
- Brit Award for Outstanding Contribution to Music
- Michael Jackson Video Vanguard Award
- Grammy Lifetime Achievement Award
