= Soul Train Music Award for Quincy Jones Award for Career Achievement =

Annual US music award

This page lists the winners and nominees for the Soul Train Music Quincy Jones Award for Career Achievement, awarded from 1998 to 2007. The award was originally entitled Heritage Award for Career Achievement, but was later renamed to honor former recipient Quincy Jones. The award was split on several years, including 2003, 2004 and 2006, to honor male and female artists separately.

== Winners ==
Winners are listed first and highlighted in bold.

=== 1990s ===
Year	Artist	Ref
1998
1998	**Whitney Houston**	
1999
1999	**Luther Vandross**	

=== 2000s ===
Year	Artist	Ref
2000	—	
2001
2001	**Ron Isley and The Isley Brothers**	
2002
2002	**The O'Jays**	
2003
2003	**LL Cool J** (Male)	
2003	**Mariah Carey** (Female)	
2004
2004	**R. Kelly** (Male)	
2004	**Janet Jackson** (Female)	
2005
2005	**Ice Cube**	
2006
2006	**Jamie Foxx** (Male)	
2006	**Destiny's Child** (Female)	
2007
2007	**Jermaine Dupri**	

== See also ==
- Soul Train Music Award for Heritage Award – Career Achievement
