= Billboard Year-End Hot Black Singles of 1985 =

American music chart

This is a list of Billboard magazine's Top Hot Black Singles of 1985.

No.	Title	Artist(s)
1	"Rock Me Tonight (For Old Times Sake)"	Freddie Jackson
2	"You Give Good Love"	Whitney Houston
3	"Missing You"	Diana Ross
4	"Nightshift"	Commodores
5	"Saving All My Love for You"	Whitney Houston
6	"In My House"	Mary Jane Girls
7	"Freeway of Love"	Aretha Franklin
8	"Solid"	Ashford & Simpson
9	"Oh Sheila"	Ready for the World
10	"Gotta Get You Home Tonight"	Eugene Wilde
11	"(No Matter How High I Get) I'll Still be Looking Up to You"	Wilton Felder and Bobby Womack
12	"Hangin' on a String (Contemplating)"	Loose Ends
13	"Cherish"	Kool & the Gang
14	"Mr. Telephone Man"	New Edition
15	"Fresh"	Kool & the Gang
16	"Misled"	Kool & the Gang
17	"You Are My Lady"	Freddie Jackson
18	"Rhythm of the Night"	DeBarge
19	"Operator"	Midnight Star
20	"Treat Her Like a Lady"	The Temptations
21	"Save Your Love (For #1)"	René & Angela
22	"I Wonder If I Take You Home"	Lisa Lisa and Cult Jam
23	"Til My Baby Comes Home"	Luther Vandross
24	"The Men All Pause"	Klymaxx
25	"Part-Time Lover"	Stevie Wonder
26	"Suddenly"	Billy Ocean
27	"Back in Stride"	Maze
28	"Who's Holding Donna Now"	DeBarge
29	"New Attitude"	Patti LaBelle
30	"Beep a Freak"	The Gap Band
31	"Electric Lady"	Con Funk Shun
32	"Smooth Operator"	Sade
33	"Easy Lover"	Philip Bailey and Phil Collins
34	"Sanctified Lady"	Marvin Gaye
35	"Attack Me with Your Love"	Cameo
36	"Be Your Man"	Jesse Johnson
37	"We Are the World"	USA for Africa
38	"I Wish He Didn't Trust Me So Much"	Bobby Womack
39	"Private Dancer"	Tina Turner
40	"Tonight"	Ready for the World
41	"All of Me For All of You"	9.9
42	"Rain Forest"	Paul Hardcastle
43	"Can You Help Me"	Jesse Johnson
44	"Raspberry Beret"	Prince and the Revolution
45	"Show Me"	Glenn Jones
46	"Object of My Desire"	Starpoint
47	"Love Light in Flight"	Stevie Wonder
48	"Meeting in the Ladies Room"	Klymaxx
49	"We Don't Need Another Hero (Thunderdome)"	Tina Turner
50	"Dare Me"	The Pointer Sisters

== See also ==
- 1985 in music
- Billboard Year-End Hot 100 singles of 1985
- List of Hot Black Singles number ones of 1985
