= Billboard Year-End Hot Black Singles of 1986 =

American music chart

This is a list of Billboard magazine's Top Hot Black Singles of 1986.

No.	Title	Artist(s)
1	"On My Own"	Patti LaBelle and Michael McDonald
2	"Do Me, Baby"	Meli'sa Morgan
3	"Secret Lovers"	Atlantic Starr
4	"That's What Friends Are For"	Dionne Warwick, Elton John, Gladys Knight and Stevie Wonder (as "Dionne & Friends")
5	"Nasty"	Janet Jackson
6	"Kiss"	Prince and the Revolution
7	"Rumors"	Timex Social Club
8	"There'll Be Sad Songs (To Make You Cry)"	Billy Ocean
9	"I Have Learned to Respect the Power of Love"	Stephanie Mills
10	"I Can't Wait"	Nu Shooz
11	"Say You, Say Me"	Lionel Richie
12	"Your Smile"	René & Angela
13	"What Have You Done for Me Lately"	Janet Jackson
14	"All Cried Out"	Lisa Lisa and Cult Jam
15	"Don't Say No Tonight"	Eugene Wilde
16	"The Rain"	Oran "Juice" Jones
17	"Word Up!"	Cameo
18	"Closer than Close"	Jean Carne
19	"Sweet Love"	Anita Baker
20	"The Finest"	The S.O.S. Band
21	"Do You Get Enough Love"	Shirley Jones
22	"The Sweetest Taboo"	Sade
23	"Ain't Nothin' Goin' On but the Rent"	Gwen Guthrie
24	"Guilty"	Yarbrough and Peoples
25	"Who's Johnny"	El DeBarge
26	"You Should Be Mine (The Woo Woo Song)"	Jeffrey Osborne
27	"Tender Love"	Force MDs
28	"Digital Display"	Ready for the World
29	"How Will I Know"	Whitney Houston
30	"Saturday Love"	Cherrelle and Alexander O'Neal
31	"Caravan of Love"	Isley-Jasper-Isley
32	"Give Me the Reason"	Luther Vandross
33	"Crush on You"	The Jets
34	"Let Me Be the One"	Five Star
35	"Go Home"	Stevie Wonder
36	"You Don't Have to Cry"	René & Angela
37	"If Your Heart Isn't In It"	Atlantic Starr
38	"A Love Bizarre"	Sheila E.
39	"Going in Circles"	The Gap Band
40	"Count Me Out"	New Edition
41	"(Pop, Pop, Pop, Pop) Goes My Mind"	LeVert
42	"Headlines"	Midnight Star
43	"When the Going Gets Tough, the Tough Get Going"	Billy Ocean
44	"Shake You Down"	Gregory Abbott
45	"Do You Still Love Me"	Meli'sa Morgan
46	"Greatest Love of All"	Starpoint
47	"When I Think of You"	Janet Jackson
48	"I'm For Real"	Howard Hewett
49	"Love Zone"	Billy Ocean
50	"Count Your Blessings"	Ashford & Simpson

== See also ==
- 1986 in music
- Billboard Year-End Hot 100 singles of 1986
- List of Hot Black Singles number ones of 1986
