= List of Hot Black Singles number ones of 1985 =

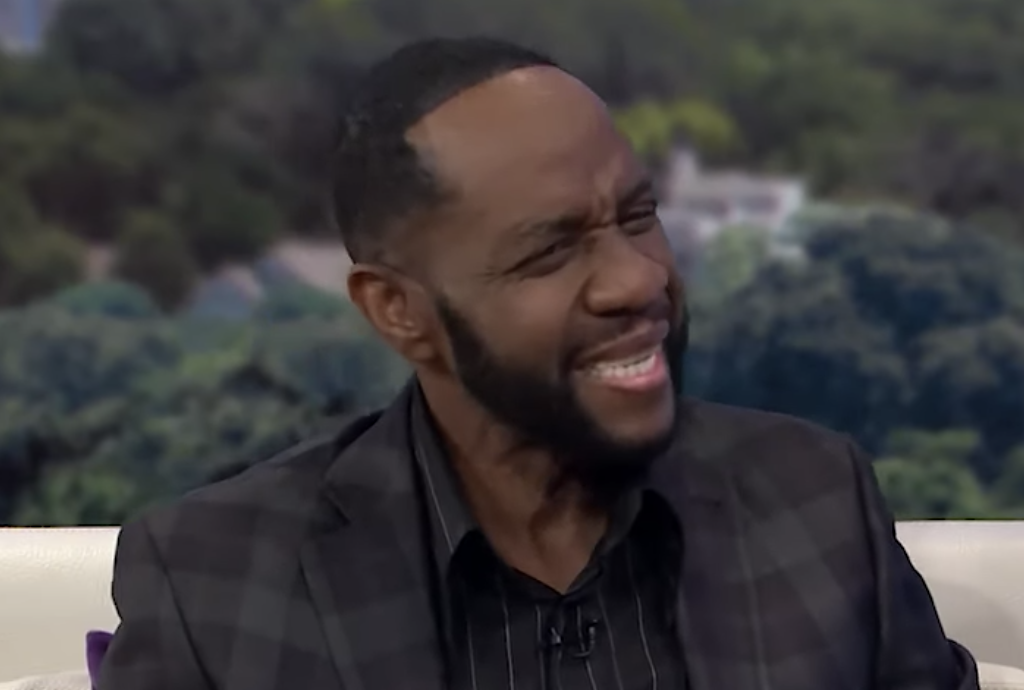
Freddie Jackson (pictured in 2019) spent eight weeks at number one in 1985, the most by any act.

Billboard published a weekly chart in 1985 ranking the top-performing singles in the United States in African American-oriented genres; the chart has undergone various name changes over the decades to reflect the evolution of black music and has been published as Hot R&B/Hip-Hop Songs since 2005. In 1985, it was published under the title Hot Black Singles, and 21 different singles reached number one.

In the issue of Billboard dated January 5, the group Midnight Star was at number one with "Operator", the song's third week atop the chart. The track ultimately spent five weeks in the top spot, but would prove to be the group's only chart-topper. It was replaced at number one by "Gotta Get You Home Tonight" by Eugene Wilde, who reached the peak position with his first single to enter the chart. Seven other acts reached number one for the first time during the year: Maze featuring Frankie Beverly with "Back in Stride" in April, the supergroup USA For Africa with "We Are the World" and Whitney Houston with "You Give Good Love" in May, Freddie Jackson with "Rock Me Tonight (For Old Times Sake)" in June, both Loose Ends with "Hangin' on a String (Contemplating)" and René & Angela with "Save Your Love (For #1)" in July, and Ready for the World with "Oh Sheila" in September. Both Houston and Jackson achieved a second chart-topper before the end of the year. Additionally, the trio Isley-Jasper-Isley had their first chart topper under that name with "Caravan of Love", having previously spent time at number one as part of the Isley Brothers. "We Are the World", a charity single intended to relieve starving people in Africa, particularly those feeling the effects of a lengthy famine in Ethiopia, became the fastest-selling American pop single in history and dominated radio airplay. As a result, it topped the Hot 100, Hot Adult Contemporary, Hot Black Singles, and Hot Dance/Disco 12 Inch Singles Sales charts. Houston's "Saving All My Love for You", Ready for the World's "Oh Sheila" and Stevie Wonder's "Part-Time Lover" also topped both the Black Singles chart and the Hot 100.

In addition to Houston and Jackson, Kool & the Gang and Wilde had multiple number ones during 1985. Jackson's "Rock Me Tonight (For Old Times Sake)" tied with "Part-Time Lover" by Wonder for 1985's longest run in the peak position at six weeks each; Jackson's total of eight weeks at number one was the most of any act. In August, Aretha Franklin's "Freeway of Love" became her twentieth chart-topper, extending her record as the artist with the most number ones on the listing; it would prove to be her final appearance atop the chart, 18 years after her first. Diana Ross, another of the biggest stars of black music, also topped the chart for the final time. She spent three weeks at number one with "Missing You", a tribute to singer Marvin Gaye, who had died the previous year. Ross had first topped the chart as one of the Supremes in 1965. The final number one of 1985 was Wilde's "Don't Say No Tonight"; although Wilde gained two number ones in 1985, he would achieve no further chart-toppers in his career.

== Chart history ==
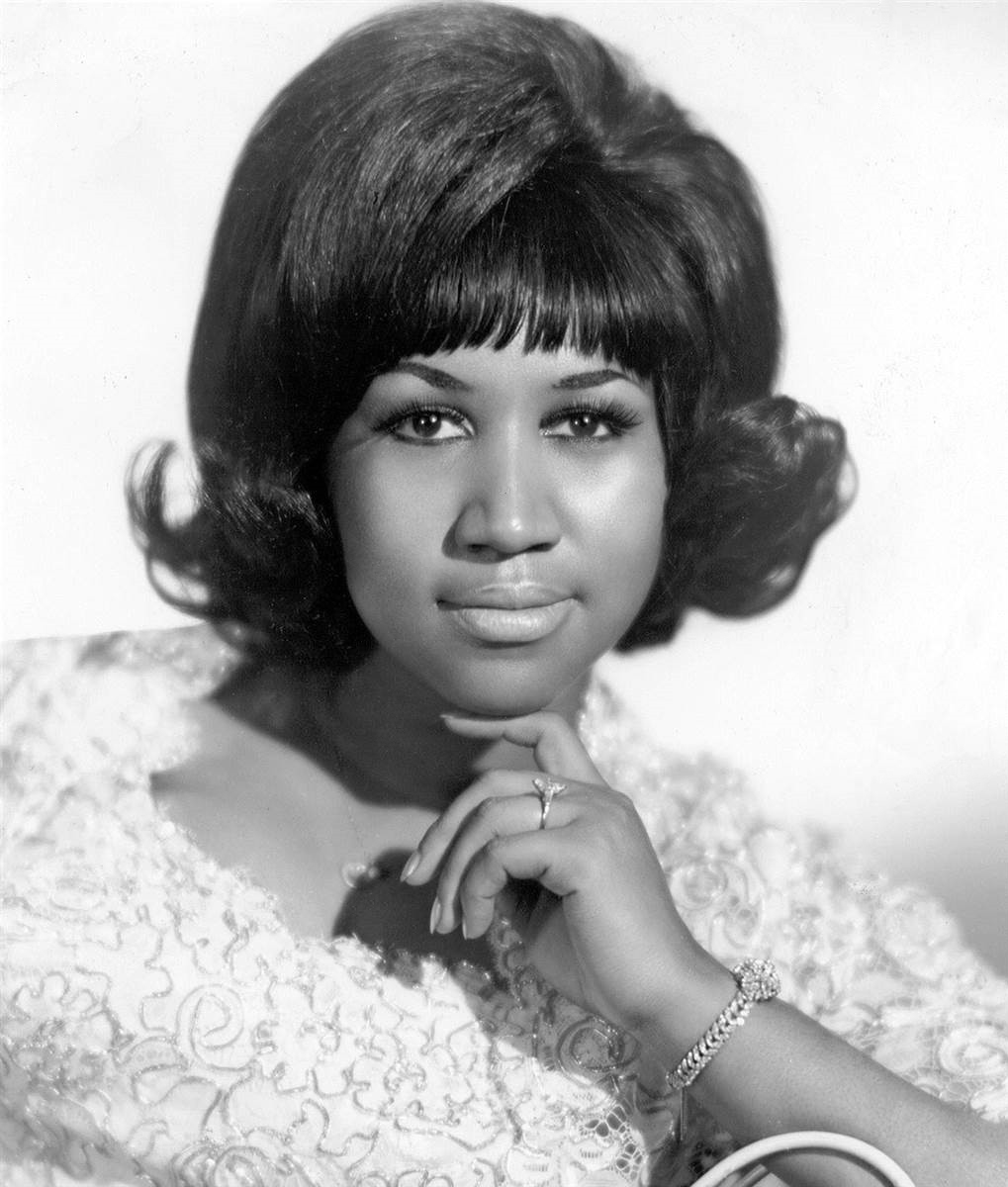
"Freeway of Love" by Aretha Franklin (pictured in 1968) was her record-extending 20th number one on the chart when it reached the top position in August.

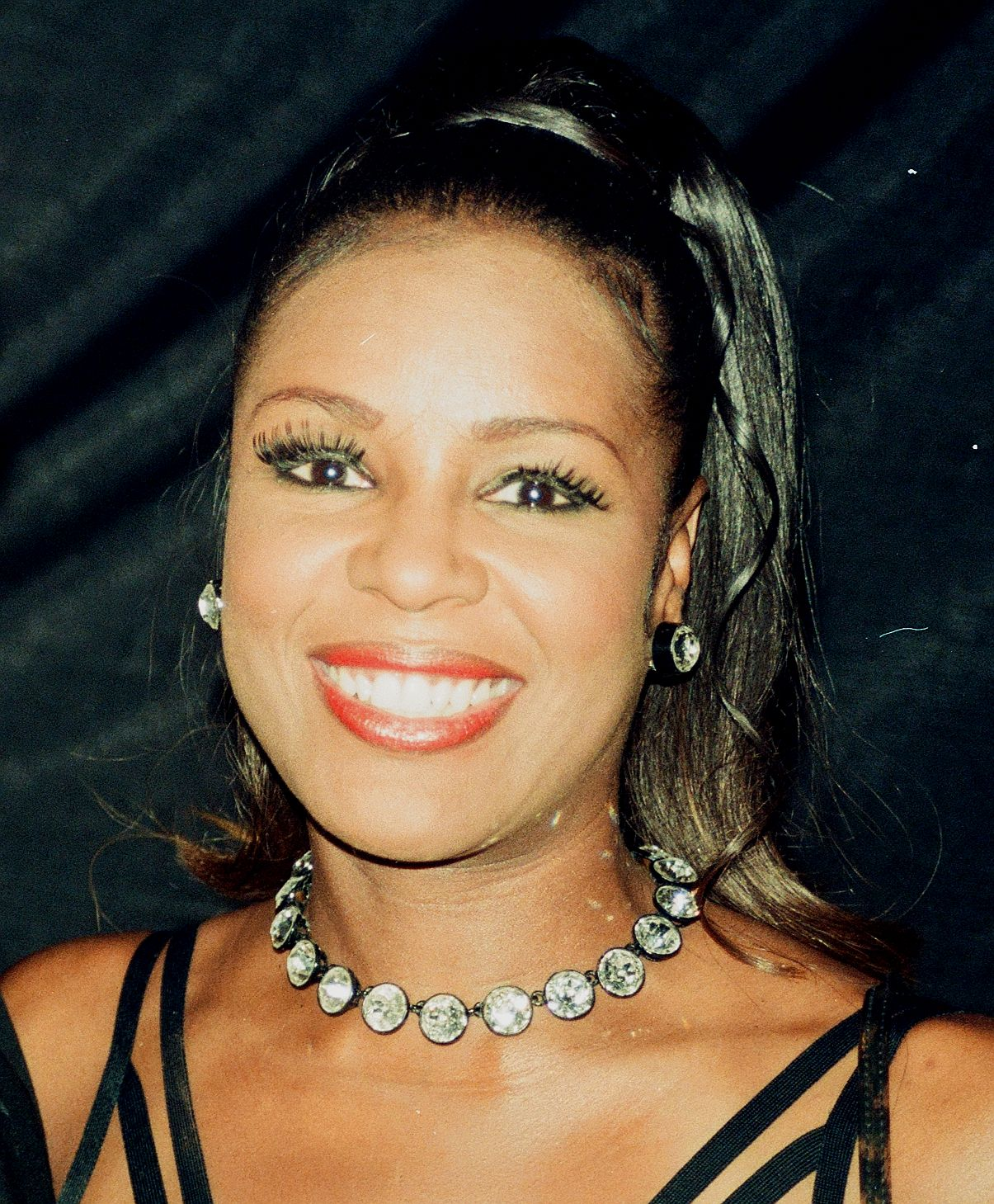
"Save Your Love (For #1)" was a chart-topper for René & Angela (Angela Winbush pictured in 1996).

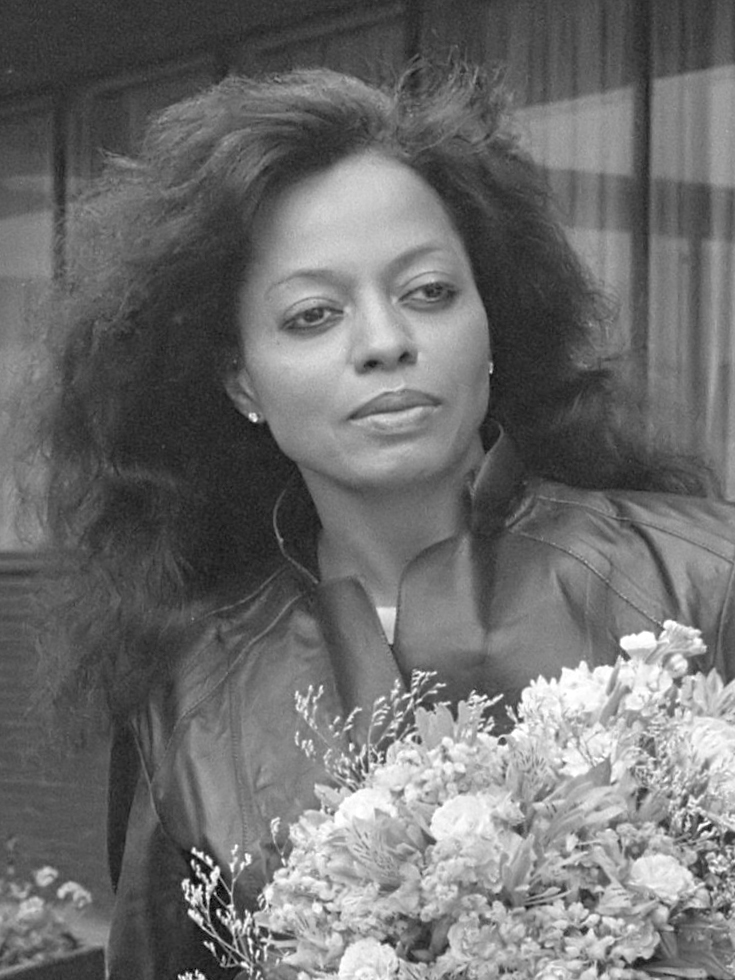
"Missing You" was the final number one on the chart for Diana Ross (pictured in 1982), who had first topped the listing in 1965 as part of the Supremes.

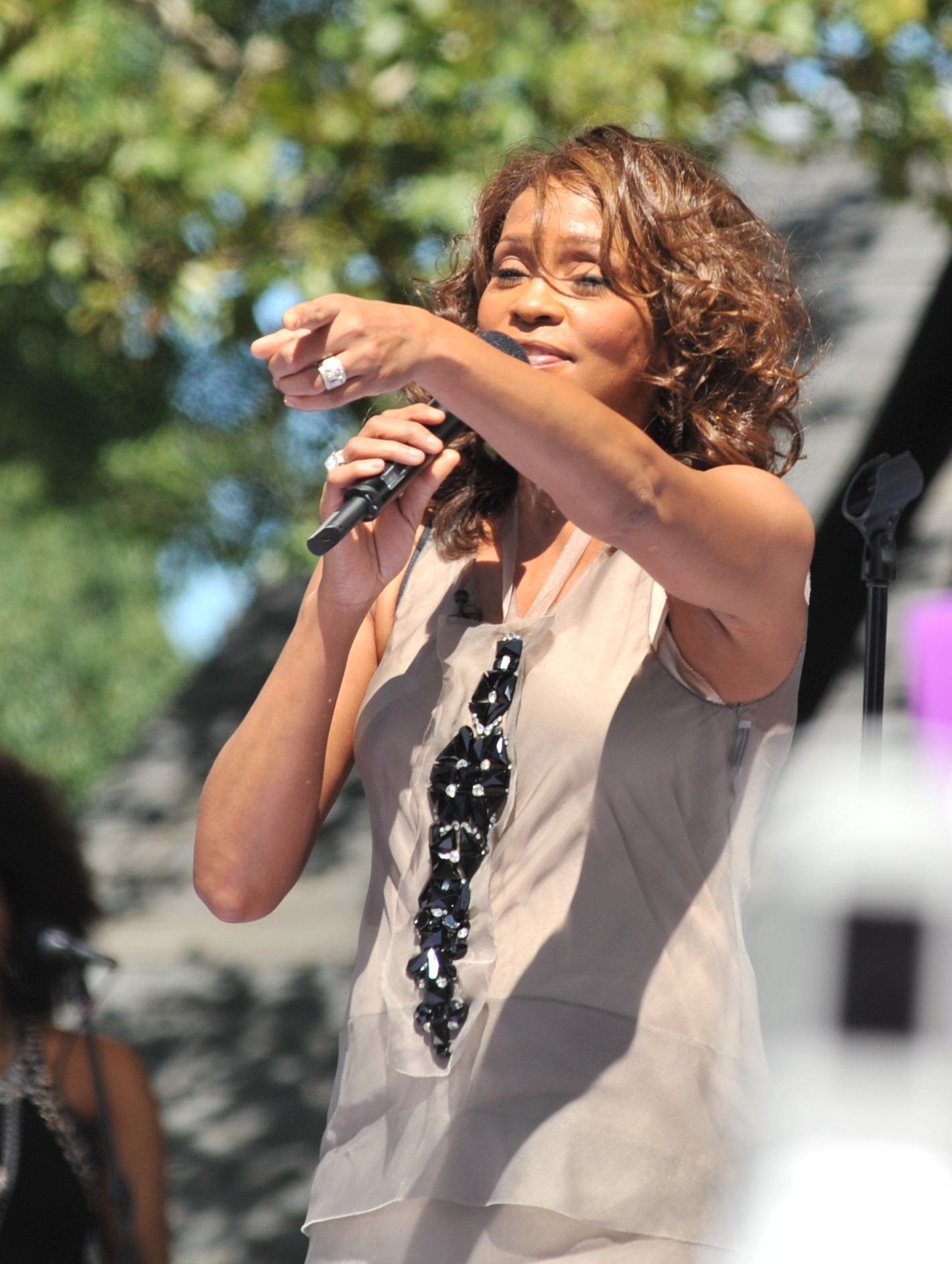
Whitney Houston (pictured in 2009) reached number one for the first time with "You Give Good Love".

Key
†	Indicates number 1 on Billboard's year-end black singles chart

Chart history
Issue date	Title	Artist(s)	Ref.
January 5	"Operator"	Midnight Star	
January 12	"Operator"	Midnight Star	
January 19	"Operator"	Midnight Star	
January 26	"Gotta Get You Home Tonight"	Eugene Wilde	
February 2	"Mr. Telephone Man"	New Edition	
February 9	"Mr. Telephone Man"	New Edition	
February 16	"Mr. Telephone Man"	New Edition	
February 23	"Missing You"	Diana Ross	
March 2	"Missing You"	Diana Ross	
March 9	"Missing You"	Diana Ross	
March 16	"Nightshift"	Commodores	
March 23	"Nightshift"	Commodores	
March 30	"Nightshift"	Commodores	
April 6	"Nightshift"	Commodores	
April 13	"Back In Stride"	Maze featuring Frankie Beverly	
April 20	"Back In Stride"	Maze featuring Frankie Beverly	
April 27	"Rhythm Of the Night"	DeBarge	
May 4	"We Are the World"	USA for Africa	
May 11	"We Are the World"	USA for Africa	
May 18	"Fresh"	Kool & the Gang	
May 25	"You Give Good Love"	Whitney Houston	
June 1	"Rock Me Tonight (For Old Times Sake)" †	Freddie Jackson	
June 8	"Rock Me Tonight (For Old Times Sake)" †	Freddie Jackson	
June 15	"Rock Me Tonight (For Old Times Sake)" †	Freddie Jackson	
June 22	"Rock Me Tonight (For Old Times Sake)" †	Freddie Jackson	
June 29	"Rock Me Tonight (For Old Times Sake)" †	Freddie Jackson	
July 6	"Rock Me Tonight (For Old Times Sake)" †	Freddie Jackson	
July 13	"Hangin' on a String (Contemplating)"	Loose Ends	
July 20	"Save Your Love (For #1)"	René & Angela	
July 27	"Save Your Love (For #1)"	René & Angela	
August 3	"Freeway of Love"	Aretha Franklin	
August 10	"Freeway of Love"	Aretha Franklin	
August 17	"Freeway of Love"	Aretha Franklin	
August 24	"Freeway of Love"	Aretha Franklin	
August 31	"Freeway of Love"	Aretha Franklin	
September 7	"Saving All My Love for You"	Whitney Houston	
September 14	"Cherish"	Kool & the Gang	
September 21	"Oh Sheila"	Ready For the World	
September 28	"Oh Sheila"	Ready For the World	
October 5	"You Are My Lady"	Freddie Jackson	
October 12	"You Are My Lady"	Freddie Jackson	
October 19	"Part-Time Lover"	Stevie Wonder	
October 26	"Part-Time Lover"	Stevie Wonder	
November 2	"Part-Time Lover"	Stevie Wonder	
November 9	"Part-Time Lover"	Stevie Wonder	
November 16	"Part-Time Lover"	Stevie Wonder	
November 23	"Part-Time Lover"	Stevie Wonder	
November 30	"Caravan of Love"	Isley-Jasper-Isley	
December 7	"Caravan of Love"	Isley-Jasper-Isley	
December 14	"Caravan of Love"	Isley-Jasper-Isley	
December 21	"Don't Say No Tonight"	Eugene Wilde	
December 28	"Don't Say No Tonight"	Eugene Wilde	

== See also ==
- Billboard Year-End Hot Black Singles of 1985
- List of Billboard Hot 100 number ones of 1985
