= List of Hot Black Singles number ones of 1986 =

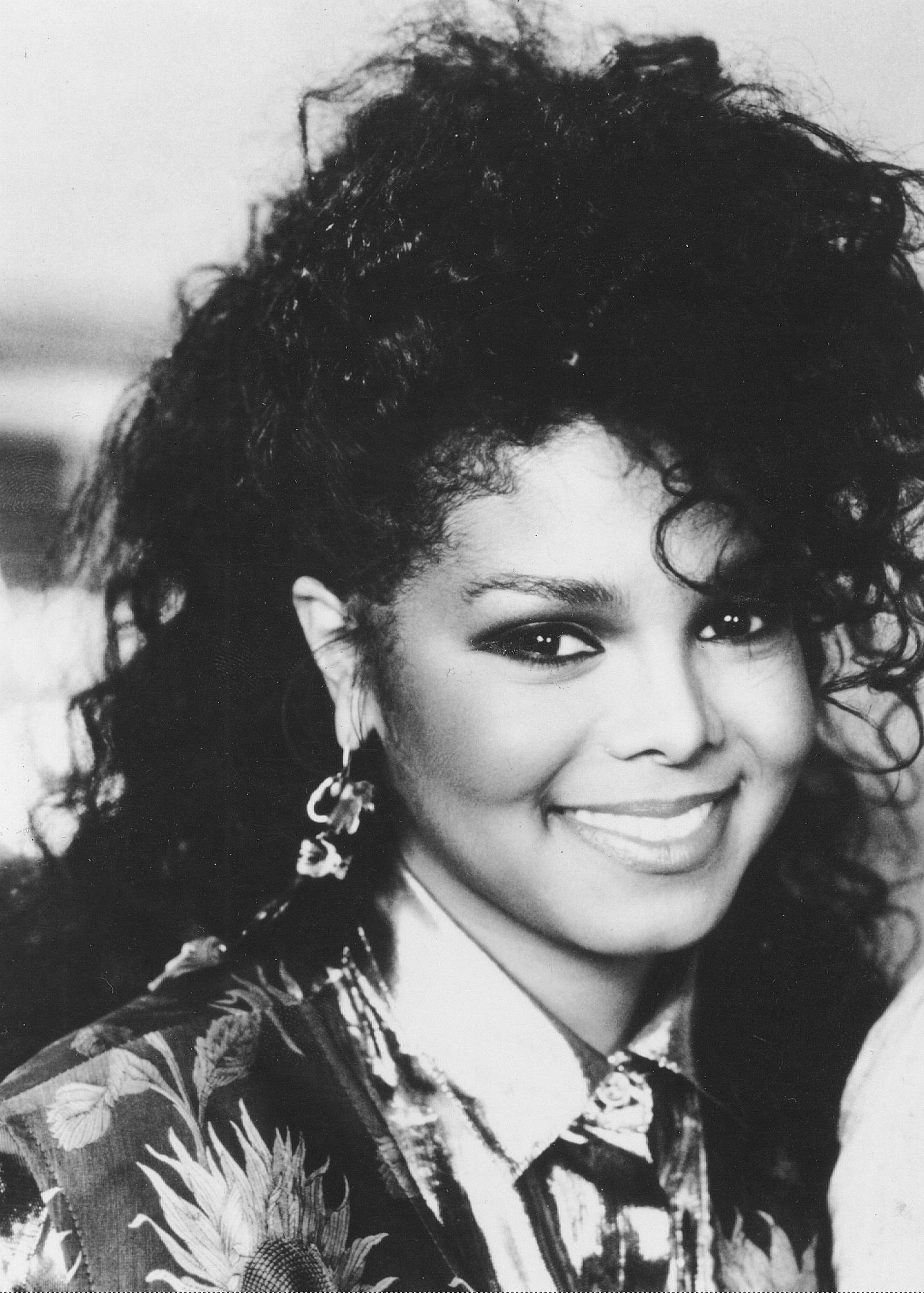
Janet Jackson (pictured in 1986) reached number one for the first time with "What Have You Done for Me Lately".

Billboard published a weekly chart in 1986 ranking the top-performing singles in the United States in African American-oriented genres; the chart has undergone various name changes over the decades to reflect the evolution of black music and has been published as Hot R&B/Hip-Hop Songs since 2005. In 1986, it was published under the title Hot Black Singles, and 26 different singles reached number one.

In the issue of Billboard dated January 4, Eugene Wilde was at number one with "Don't Say No Tonight", the final week of a three-week run in the top spot. The year's third number one was a charity single featuring four artists who had all topped either the Black Singles chart or Billboard's pop chart, the Hot 100. "That's What Friends Are For" featured Dionne Warwick, Gladys Knight, Stevie Wonder and Elton John, and had been organized by Warwick as a fund-raiser for the American Foundation for AIDS Research. The song also topped the Hot 100, and won the Grammy Awards for Best Pop Performance by a Duo or Group with Vocals and Song of the Year. "Say You, Say Me" by Lionel Richie, "How Will I Know" by Whitney Houston,"Kiss" by Prince and the Revolution, "On My Own" by Patti LaBelle and Michael McDonald, and "There'll Be Sad Songs (To Make You Cry)" by Billy Ocean also topped both the Black Singles chart and the Hot 100.

Many of the acts that topped the chart in 1986 did so for the first time. Meli'sa Morgan, Janet Jackson, Stephanie Mills, Michael McDonald, Timex Social Club, Jean Carne, Shirley Jones, Gwen Guthrie, LeVert, Oran "Juice" Jones, Gregory Abbott, and Melba Moore each gained their debut number one during the year. Jackson's older brothers had topped the chart six times as the Jackson 5 and her brothers Michael and Jermaine had achieved number ones as solo artists. She herself would go on to become one of the most successful black artists of the 1980s and 1990s, with 14 number ones by 1999. El DeBarge gained his first solo chart-topper, having previously spent time at number one with family group DeBarge, and Bobby Brown reached the peak position for the first time as a solo artist following number ones as a member of New Edition. When "That's What Friends Are For" reached the peak position, it marked the first number one on this listing for John, who had placed more than 40 singles on the Hot 100 but only crossed over to the black singles chart three times prior to 1986. Janet Jackson, Billy Ocean, and Freddie Jackson (no relation to Janet) were the only artists to have multiple Hot Black Singles number ones during the year. Freddie Jackson spent a total of five weeks in the top spot, the most of any act. His song "Tasty Love" held the peak position for four weeks, tying with "Kiss" and "On My Own" for the longest unbroken run atop the chart. Brown's track "Girlfriend" was the final number one of the year.

== Chart history ==
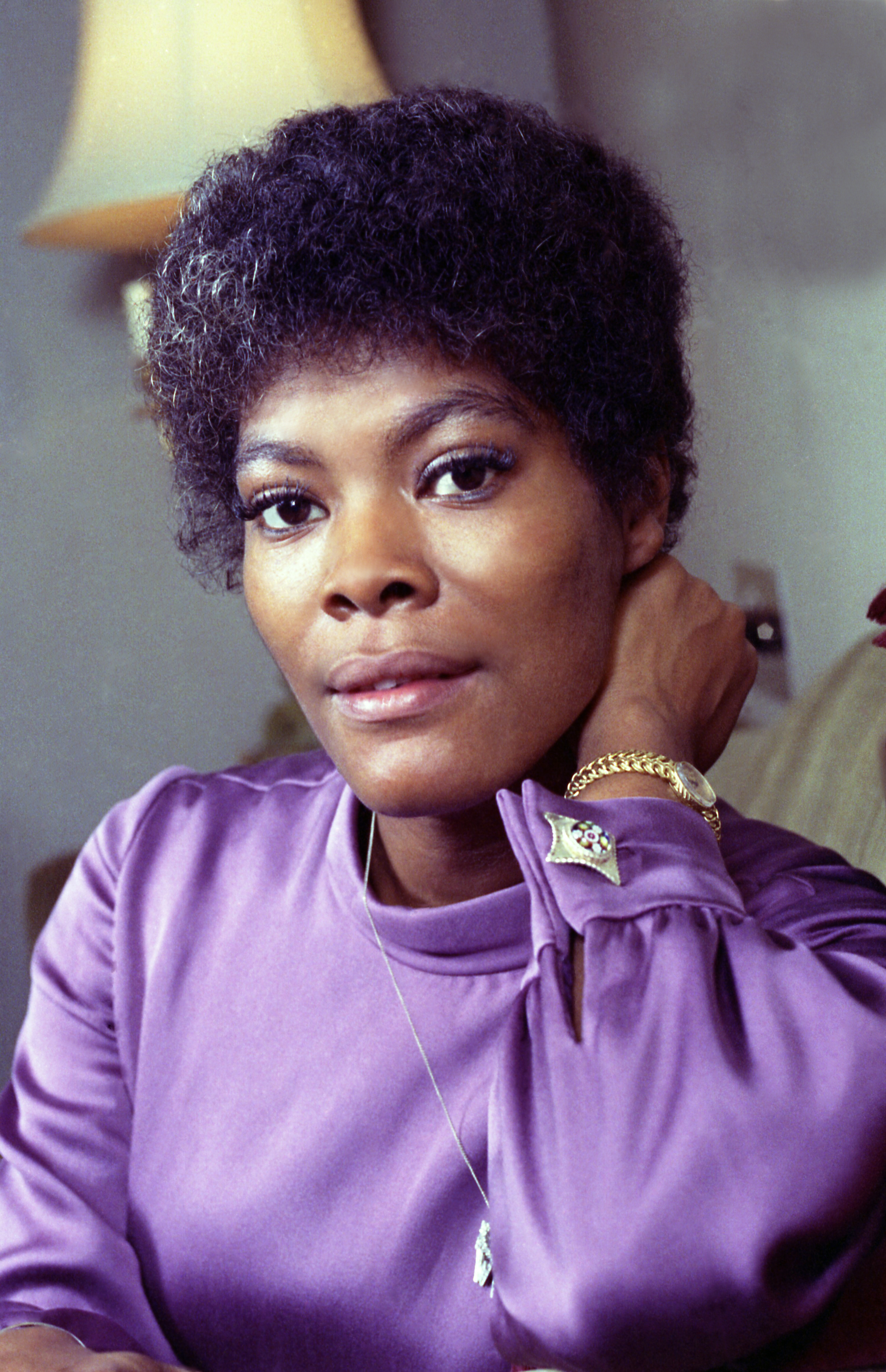
Dionne Warwick (pictured in 1973) led the all-star charity single "That's What Friends Are For".

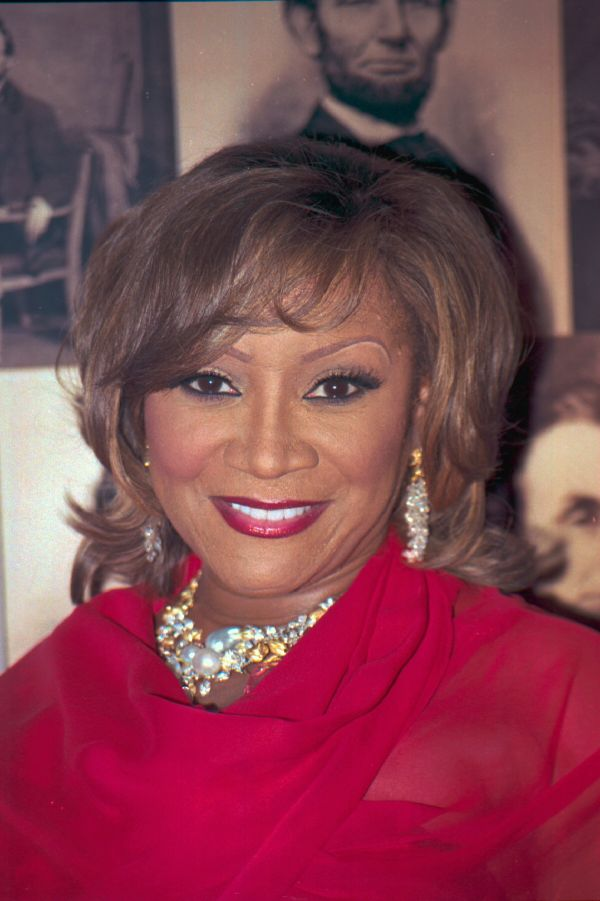
"On My Own" by Patti LaBelle (pictured in 2010) and Michael McDonald reached number one on the Hot 100 and also topped Billboard's year-end black singles chart.

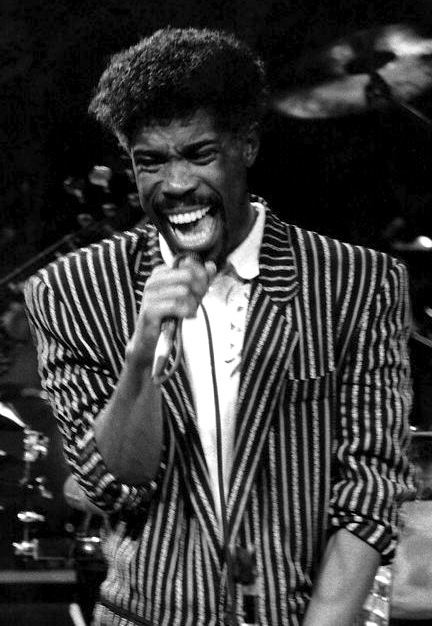
Billy Ocean (pictured in 1988) was one of only three artists to have multiple number ones during 1986.

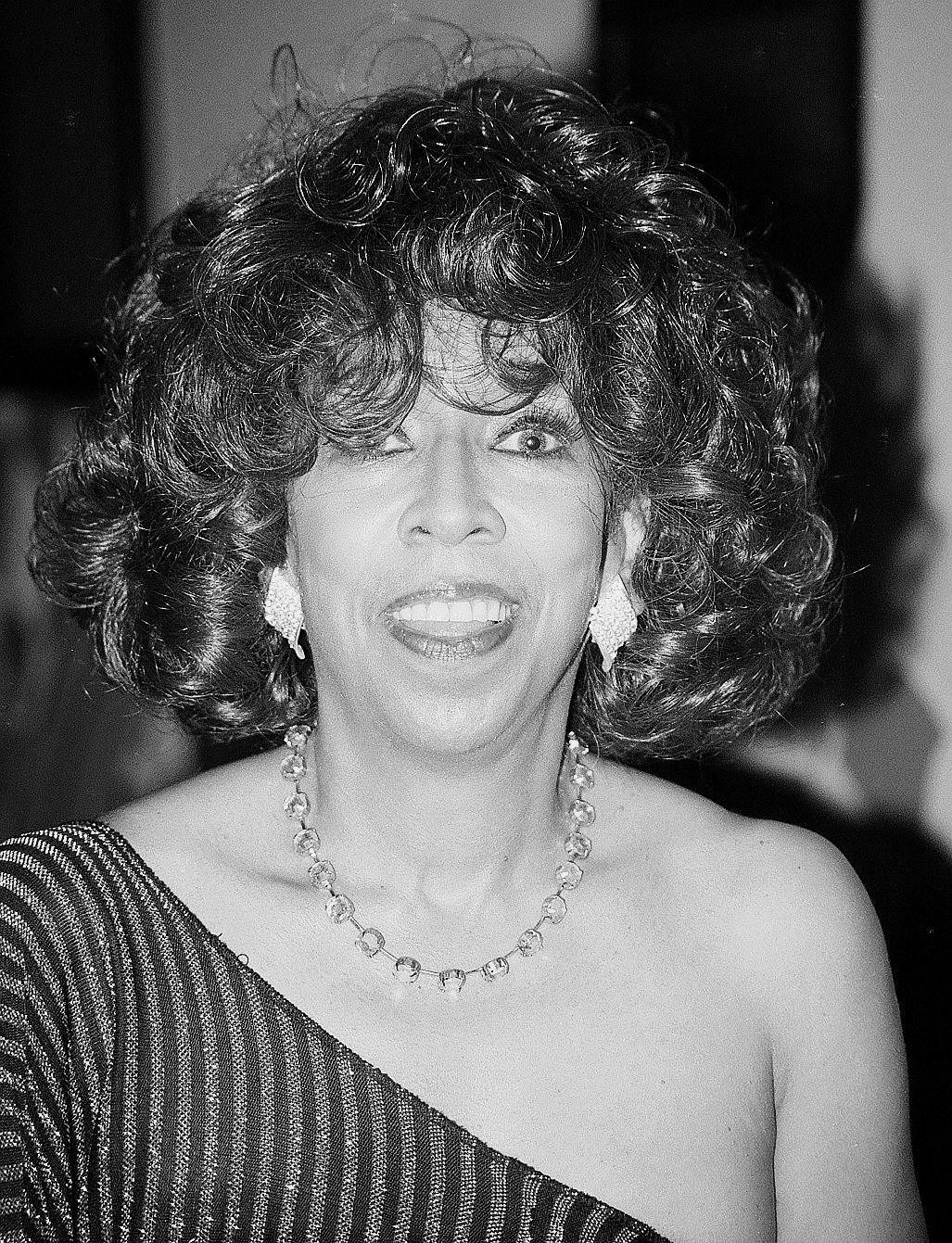
Jean Carne (pictured in 1997) gained her first number one hit with "Closer Than Close".

Key
†	Indicates number 1 on Billboard's year-end black singles chart

Chart history
Issue date	Title	Artist(s)	Ref.
January 4	"Don't Say No Tonight"	Eugene Wilde	
January 11	"Say You, Say Me"	Lionel Richie	
January 18	"Say You, Say Me"	Lionel Richie	
January 25	"That's What Friends Are For"	Dionne and Friends featuring Elton John, Gladys Knight and Stevie Wonder	
February 1	"That's What Friends Are For"	Dionne and Friends featuring Elton John, Gladys Knight and Stevie Wonder	
February 8	"That's What Friends Are For"	Dionne and Friends featuring Elton John, Gladys Knight and Stevie Wonder	
February 15	"Do Me, Baby"	Meli'sa Morgan	
February 22	"Do Me, Baby"	Meli'sa Morgan	
March 1	"Do Me, Baby"	Meli'sa Morgan	
March 8	"How Will I Know"	Whitney Houston	
March 15	"Your Smile"	René & Angela	
March 22	"What Have You Done for Me Lately"	Janet Jackson	
March 29	"What Have You Done for Me Lately"	Janet Jackson	
April 5	"Kiss"	Prince and the Revolution	
April 12	"Kiss"	Prince and the Revolution	
April 19	"Kiss"	Prince and the Revolution	
April 26	"Kiss"	Prince and the Revolution	
May 3	"I Have Learned to Respect the Power of Love"	Stephanie Mills	
May 10	"I Have Learned to Respect the Power of Love"	Stephanie Mills	
May 17	"On My Own" †	Patti LaBelle and Michael McDonald	
May 24	"On My Own" †	Patti LaBelle and Michael McDonald	
May 31	"On My Own" †	Patti LaBelle and Michael McDonald	
June 7	"On My Own" †	Patti LaBelle and Michael McDonald	
June 14	"Nasty"	Janet Jackson	
June 21	"Nasty"	Janet Jackson	
June 28	"There'll Be Sad Songs (To Make You Cry)"	Billy Ocean	
July 5	"There'll Be Sad Songs (To Make You Cry)"	Billy Ocean	
July 12	"Who's Johnny"	El DeBarge	
July 19	"Rumors"	Timex Social Club	
July 26	"Rumors"	Timex Social Club	
August 2	"Closer Than Close"	Jean Carne	
August 9	"Closer Than Close"	Jean Carne	
August 16	"Do You Get Enough Love"	Shirley Jones	
August 23	"Do You Get Enough Love"	Shirley Jones	
August 30	"Love Zone"	Billy Ocean	
September 6	"Ain't Nothin' Goin' on But the Rent"	Gwen Guthrie	
September 13	"(Pop, Pop, Pop, Pop) Goes My Mind"	LeVert	
September 20	"The Rain"	Oran "Juice" Jones	
September 27	"The Rain"	Oran "Juice" Jones	
October 4	"Word Up"	Cameo	
October 11	"Word Up"	Cameo	
October 18	"Word Up"	Cameo	
October 25	"Shake You Down"	Gregory Abbott	
November 1	"Shake You Down"	Gregory Abbott	
November 8	"A Little Bit More"	Melba Moore with Freddie Jackson	
November 15	"Tasty Love"	Freddie Jackson	
November 22	"Tasty Love"	Freddie Jackson	
November 29	"Tasty Love"	Freddie Jackson	
December 6	"Tasty Love"	Freddie Jackson	
December 13	"Love You Down"	Ready for the World	
December 20	"Love You Down"	Ready for the World	
December 27	"Girlfriend"	Bobby Brown	

== See also ==
- Billboard Year-End Hot Black Singles of 1986
- List of Billboard Hot 100 number ones of 1986
