= List of Billboard Hot 100 top-ten singles in 1986 =

This is a list of singles that have peaked in the Top 10 of the Billboard Hot 100 during 1986.

In 1986, a total of 121 singles reached the top ten on the Hot 100. 109 singles reached their peaks throughout the year, while the remaining twelve reached their peaks in preceding and succeeding years. A total of 30 singles reached number one that year, along with 11 singles that reached a peak of number two.

All #1 singles that had all top ten weeks in 1986 had either only six or seven weeks in the top ten. Janet Jackson scored four top ten hits during the year with "What Have You Done for Me Lately", "Nasty", "When I Think of You", and "Control", the most among all other artists.

== Top-ten singles ==
- (#) – 1986 Year-end top 10 single position and rank

List of Billboard Hot 100 top ten singles which peaked in 1986
| Top ten entry date | Single | Artist(s) | Peak | Peak date | Weeks in top ten |
Singles from 1985
| December 21 | "That's What Friends Are For" (#1) | Dionne and Friends | 1 | January 18 | 10 |
| December 28 | "Tonight She Comes" | The Cars | 7 | January 11 | 4 |
Singles from 1986
| January 11 | "Talk to Me" | Stevie Nicks | 4 | January 25 | 5 |
| January 11 | "Walk of Life" | Dire Straits | 7 | January 25 | 4 |
| January 18 | "Burning Heart" (#8) | Survivor | 2 | February 1 | 6 |
| January 25 | "I'm Your Man" | Wham! | 3 | February 1 | 4 |
| January 25 | "My Hometown" | Bruce Springsteen | 6 | January 25 | 2 |
| January 25 | "Spies Like Us" | Paul McCartney | 7 | February 8 | 3 |
| February 1 | "When the Going Gets Tough, the Tough Get Going" | Billy Ocean | 2 | February 15 | 5 |
| February 1 | "Go Home" | Stevie Wonder | 10 | February 1 | 1 |
| February 8 | "How Will I Know" (#6) | Whitney Houston | 1 | February 15 | 6 |
| February 8 | "Kyrie" (#9) | Mr. Mister | 1 | March 1 | 7 |
| February 8 | "Living in America" | James Brown | 4 | March 1 | 5 |
| February 8 | "Conga" | Miami Sound Machine | 10 | February 8 | 2 |
| February 15 | "The Sweetest Taboo" | Sade | 5 | March 1 | 4 |
| February 15 | "Sara" | Starship | 1 | March 15 | 7 |
| February 22 | "Life in a Northern Town" | The Dream Academy | 7 | February 22 | 3 |
| February 22 | "Silent Running (On Dangerous Ground)" | Mike + the Mechanics | 6 | March 8 | 4 |
| March 1 | "Secret Lovers" | Atlantic Starr | 3 | March 22 | 6 |
| March 1 | "These Dreams" | Heart | 1 | March 22 | 6 |
| March 8 | "King for a Day" | Thompson Twins | 8 | March 22 | 3 |
| March 15 | "R.O.C.K. in the U.S.A. (A Salute to 60's Rock)" | John Cougar Mellencamp | 2 | April 5 | 5 |
| March 15 | "Rock Me Amadeus" | Falco | 1 | March 29 | 7 |
| March 15 | "Nikita" | Elton John | 7 | March 22 | 4 |
| March 22 | "What You Need" | INXS | 5 | April 12 | 5 |
| March 22 | "Kiss" | Prince and the Revolution | 1 | April 19 | 7 |
| March 29 | "Let's Go All the Way" | Sly Fox | 7 | April 12 | 4 |
| March 29 | "This Could Be the Night" | Loverboy | 10 | March 29 | 1 |
| April 5 | "Manic Monday" | The Bangles | 2 | April 19 | 5 |
| April 5 | "Addicted to Love" (#10) | Robert Palmer | 1 | May 3 | 7 |
| April 12 | "West End Girls" | Pet Shop Boys | 1 | May 10 | 7 |
| April 12 | "Harlem Shuffle" | The Rolling Stones | 5 | May 3 | 5 |
| April 12 | "Tender Love" | Force M.D.'s | 10 | April 12 | 2 |
| April 19 | "Why Can't This Be Love" | Van Halen | 3 | May 17 | 5 |
| April 26 | "What Have You Done for Me Lately" | Janet Jackson | 4 | May 17 | 6 |
| April 26 | "Your Love" | The Outfield | 6 | May 10 | 4 |
| April 26 | "Take Me Home" | Phil Collins | 7 | May 10 | 5 |
| May 3 | "Greatest Love of All" | Whitney Houston | 1 | May 17 | 7 |
| May 10 | "Bad Boy" | Miami Sound Machine | 8 | May 10 | 3 |
| May 10 | "If You Leave" | Orchestral Manoeuvres in the Dark | 4 | May 31 | 5 |
| May 17 | "Live to Tell" | Madonna | 1 | June 7 | 6 |
| May 24 | "On My Own" (#4) | Patti LaBelle and Michael McDonald | 1 | June 14 | 7 |
| May 24 | "I Can't Wait" | Nu Shooz | 3 | June 14 | 5 |
| May 24 | "All I Need Is a Miracle" | Mike + the Mechanics | 5 | June 7 | 4 |
| May 31 | "Something About You" | Level 42 | 7 | May 31 | 3 |
| May 31 | "Is It Love" | Mr. Mister | 8 | May 31 | 1 |
| May 31 | "Be Good to Yourself" | Journey | 9 | May 31 | 1 |
| June 7 | "Crush on You" | The Jets | 3 | June 21 | 5 |
| June 7 | "There'll Be Sad Songs (To Make You Cry)" | Billy Ocean | 1 | July 5 | 7 |
| June 7 | "A Different Corner" | George Michael | 7 | June 14 | 4 |
| June 14 | "No One Is to Blame" | Howard Jones | 4 | July 5 | 5 |
| June 21 | "Holding Back the Years" | Simply Red | 1 | July 12 | 6 |
| June 21 | "Who's Johnny" | El DeBarge | 3 | July 5 | 5 |
| June 21 | "Nothin' at All" | Heart | 10 | June 21 | 1 |
| June 28 | "Invisible Touch" | Genesis | 1 | July 19 | 6 |
| June 28 | "Nasty" | Janet Jackson | 3 | July 19 | 6 |
| June 28 | "Sledgehammer" | Peter Gabriel | 1 | July 26 | 7 |
| July 5 | "Danger Zone" | Kenny Loggins | 2 | July 26 | 6 |
| July 12 | "Your Wildest Dreams" | The Moody Blues | 9 | July 12 | 2 |
| July 12 | "Tuff Enuff" | The Fabulous Thunderbirds | 10 | July 12 | 1 |
| July 19 | "Glory of Love" | Peter Cetera | 1 | August 2 | 6 |
| July 19 | "Love Touch" | Rod Stewart | 6 | August 9 | 4 |
| July 26 | "Papa Don't Preach" | Madonna | 1 | August 16 | 7 |
| July 26 | "Mad About You" | Belinda Carlisle | 3 | August 9 | 6 |
| July 26 | "Modern Woman" | Billy Joel | 10 | July 26 | 1 |
| August 2 | "We Don't Have to Take Our Clothes Off" | Jermaine Stewart | 5 | August 9 | 4 |
| August 2 | "Opportunities (Let's Make Lots of Money)" | Pet Shop Boys | 10 | August 2 | 1 |
| August 9 | "Higher Love" | Steve Winwood | 1 | August 30 | 6 |
| August 9 | "Venus" | Bananarama | 1 | September 6 | 7 |
| August 9 | "Rumors" | Timex Social Club | 8 | August 16 | 4 |
| August 16 | "Dancing on the Ceiling" | Lionel Richie | 2 | September 13 | 8 |
| August 16 | "Take My Breath Away" | Berlin | 1 | September 13 | 7 |
| August 16 | "The Edge of Heaven" | Wham! | 10 | August 16 | 2 |
| August 30 | "Friends and Lovers" | Gloria Loring and Carl Anderson | 2 | September 27 | 7 |
| August 30 | "Sweet Freedom" | Michael McDonald | 7 | August 30 | 3 |
| August 30 | "Stuck with You" | Huey Lewis and the News | 1 | September 20 | 7 |
| September 6 | "Words Get in the Way" | Miami Sound Machine | 5 | September 20 | 3 |
| September 6 | "Walk This Way" | Run–D.M.C. | 4 | September 27 | 5 |
| September 13 | "Baby Love" | Regina | 10 | September 13 | 2 |
| September 20 | "Don't Forget Me (When I'm Gone)" | Glass Tiger | 2 | October 11 | 5 |
| September 20 | "Dreamtime" | Daryl Hall | 5 | October 4 | 4 |
| September 27 | "When I Think of You" | Janet Jackson | 1 | October 11 | 6 |
| September 27 | "Two of Hearts" | Stacey Q | 3 | October 11 | 4 |
| September 27 | "Love Zone" | Billy Ocean | 10 | September 27 | 1 |
| October 4 | "Throwing It All Away" | Genesis | 4 | October 11 | 4 |
| October 4 | "Typical Male" | Tina Turner | 2 | October 18 | 6 |
| October 11 | "Heartbeat" | Don Johnson | 5 | October 18 | 3 |
| October 11 | "True Colors" | Cyndi Lauper | 1 | October 25 | 6 |
| October 18 | "I Didn't Mean to Turn You On" | Robert Palmer | 2 | November 8 | 5 |
| October 18 | "All Cried Out" | Lisa Lisa and Cult Jam | 8 | October 25 | 3 |
| October 18 | "A Matter of Trust" | Billy Joel | 10 | October 18 | 1 |
| October 25 | "Amanda" | Boston | 1 | November 8 | 6 |
| October 25 | "Human" | The Human League | 1 | November 22 | 7 |
| October 25 | "Sweet Love" | Anita Baker | 8 | November 1 | 2 |
| November 1 | "True Blue" | Madonna | 3 | November 15 | 5 |
| November 1 | "Take Me Home Tonight" | Eddie Money | 4 | November 15 | 4 |
| November 8 | "You Give Love a Bad Name" | Bon Jovi | 1 | November 29 | 6 |
| November 8 | "Word Up!" | Cameo | 6 | November 22 | 5 |
| November 8 | "The Rain" | Oran "Juice" Jones | 9 | November 15 | 2 |
| November 15 | "The Next Time I Fall" | Peter Cetera and Amy Grant | 1 | December 6 | 6 |
| November 22 | "Hip to Be Square" | Huey Lewis and the News | 3 | December 6 | 5 |
| November 22 | "The Way It Is" | Bruce Hornsby and the Range | 1 | December 13 | 8 |
| November 22 | "Love Will Conquer All" | Lionel Richie | 9 | November 29 | 3 |
| November 29 | "Walk Like an Egyptian" | The Bangles | 1 | December 20 | 8 |
| December 6 | "Everybody Have Fun Tonight" | Wang Chung | 2 | December 27 | 7 |
| December 6 | "To Be a Lover" | Billy Idol | 6 | December 20 | 3 |
| December 13 | "Stand by Me" | Ben E. King | 9 | December 20 | 4 |
| December 27 | "War" | Bruce Springsteen and the E Street Band | 8 | December 27 | 3 |
| December 27 | "Don't Get Me Wrong" | The Pretenders | 10 | December 27 | 2 |

=== 1985 peaks ===
List of Billboard Hot 100 top ten singles in 1986 which peaked in 1985
| Top ten entry date | Single | Artist(s) | Peak | Peak date | Weeks in top ten |
|---|---|---|---|---|---|
| November 9 | "Separate Lives" | Phil Collins and Marilyn Martin | 1 | November 30 | 9 |
| November 16 | "Broken Wings" (#5) | Mr. Mister | 1 | December 7 | 9 |
| November 30 | "Election Day" | Arcadia | 6 | December 14 | 6 |
| November 30 | "Party All the Time" (#7) | Eddie Murphy | 2 | December 28 | 9 |
| December 7 | "Say You, Say Me" (#2) | Lionel Richie | 1 | December 21 | 9 |
| December 14 | "Alive and Kicking" | Simple Minds | 3 | December 28 | 6 |
| December 14 | "I Miss You" (#3) | Klymaxx | 5 | December 28 | 7 |
| December 21 | "Small Town" | John Cougar Mellencamp | 6 | December 28 | 5 |

=== 1987 peaks ===
List of Billboard Hot 100 top ten singles in 1986 which peaked in 1987
| Top ten entry date | Single | Artist(s) | Peak | Peak date | Weeks in top ten |
|---|---|---|---|---|---|
| December 13 | "Notorious" | Duran Duran | 2 | January 10 | 6 |
| December 13 | "Shake You Down" | Gregory Abbott | 1 | January 17 | 8 |
| December 20 | "C'est la Vie" | Robbie Nevil | 2 | January 17 | 7 |
| December 27 | "Control" | Janet Jackson | 5 | January 24 | 6 |

== See also ==
- 1986 in music
- List of Billboard Hot 100 number ones of 1986
- Billboard Year-End Hot 100 singles of 1986
