= Billboard Year-End Hot 100 singles of 1986 =

Ranking of recorded music

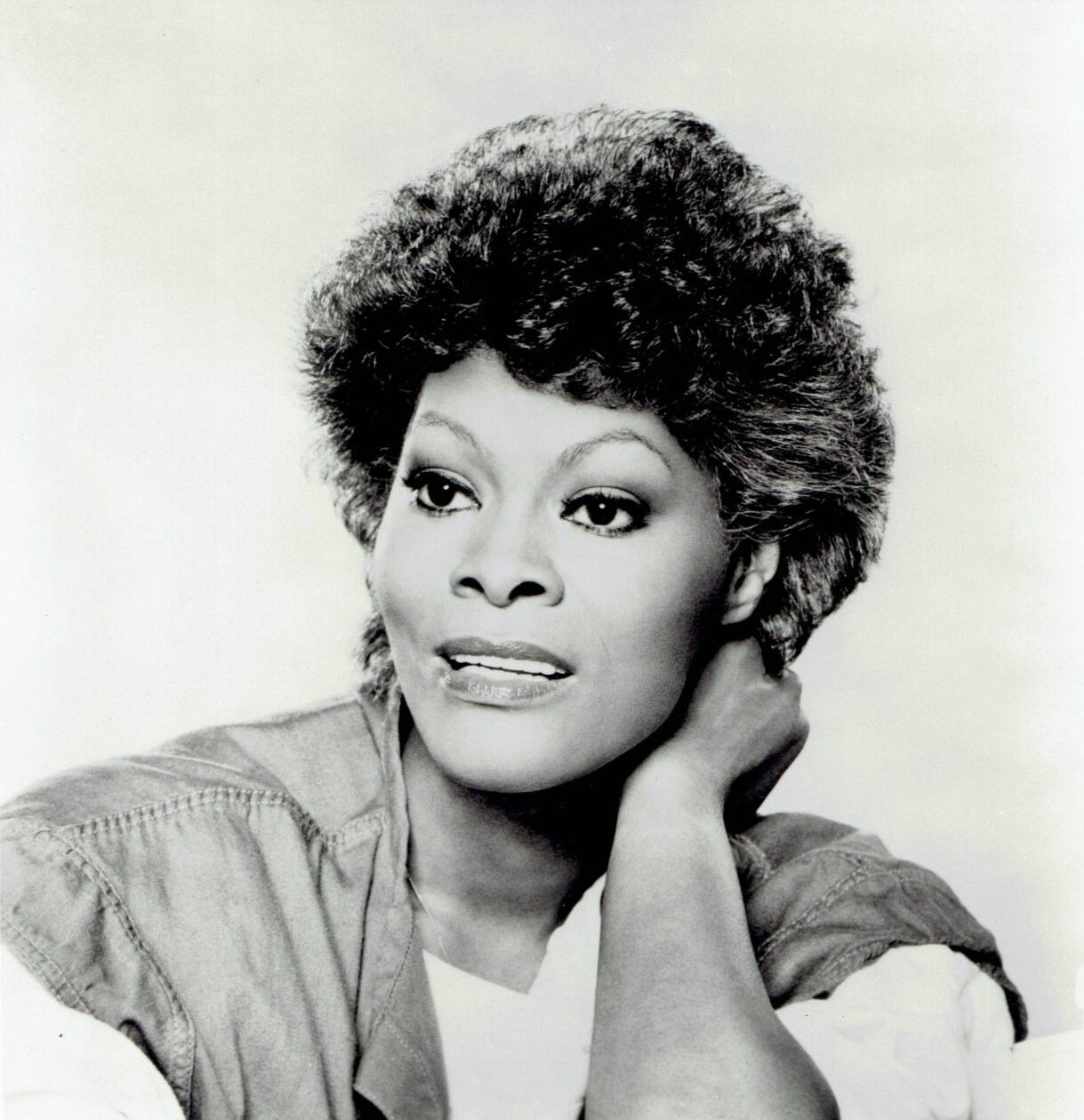
"That's What Friends Are For" by Dionne Warwick (pictured) and Friends was the number one song of 1986.

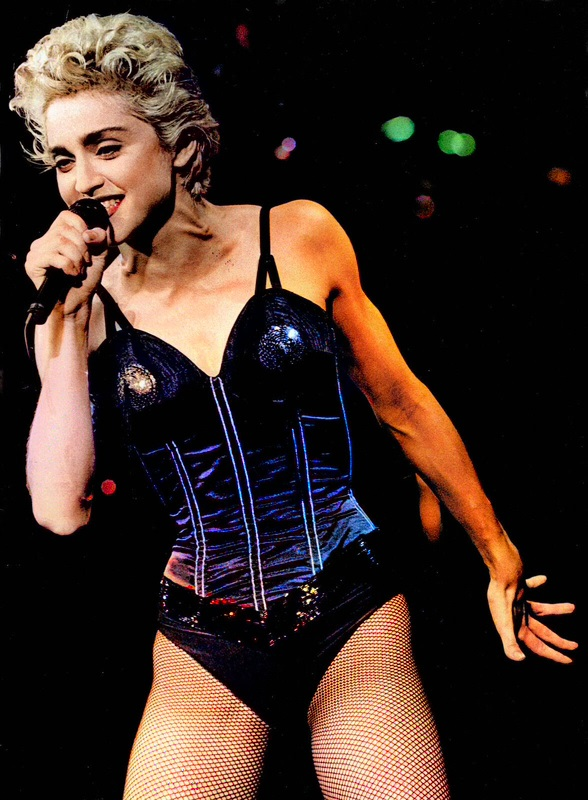
Madonna charted three songs from her album True Blue on the year-end chart, two of which ("Papa Don't Preach" and "Live to Tell") appeared in its top-40.

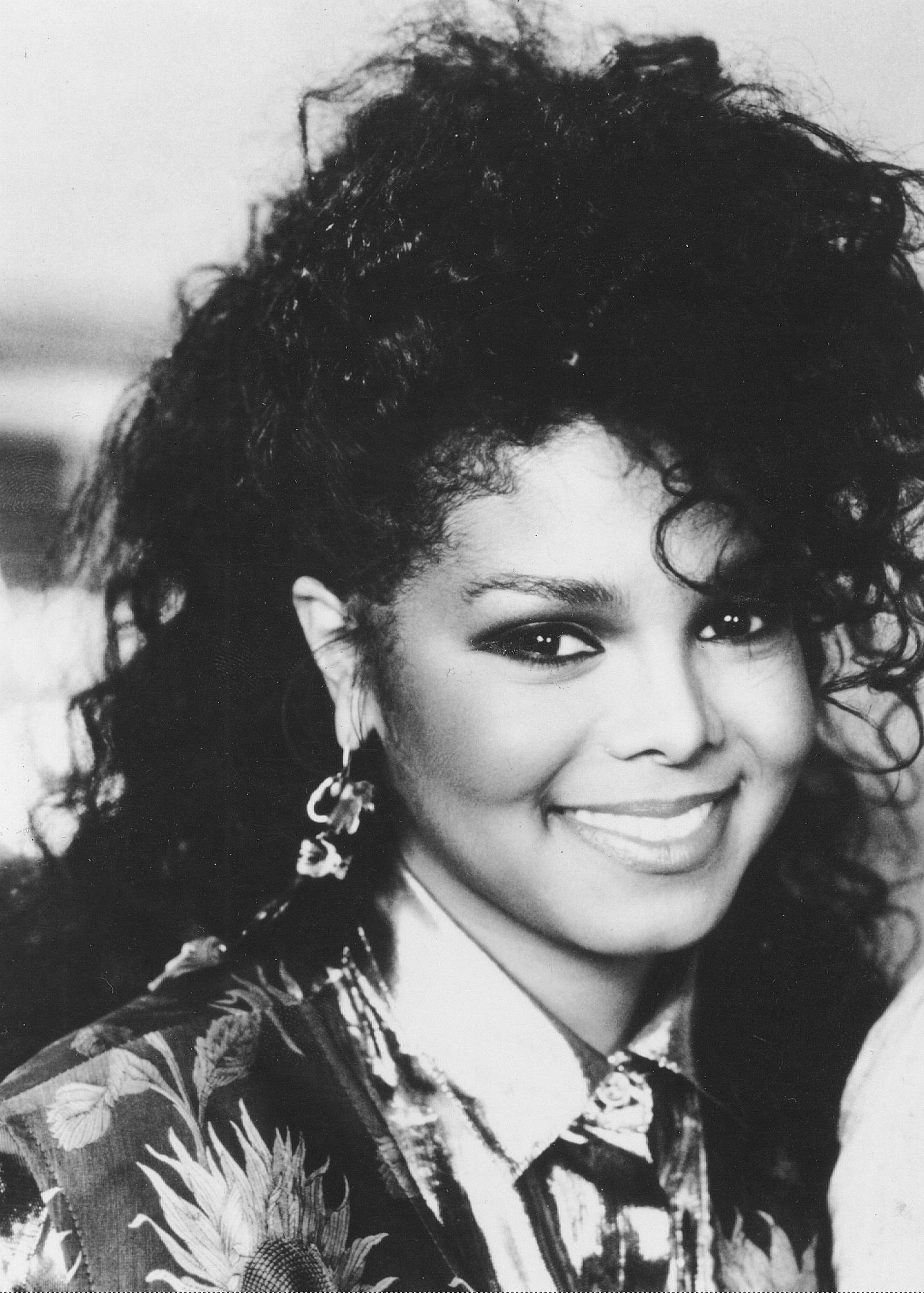
Janet Jackson had three songs on the year-end chart of 1986, all from her album Control: "When I Think of You" (number 32), "What Have You Done For Me Lately" (number 43), and "Nasty" (number 58).

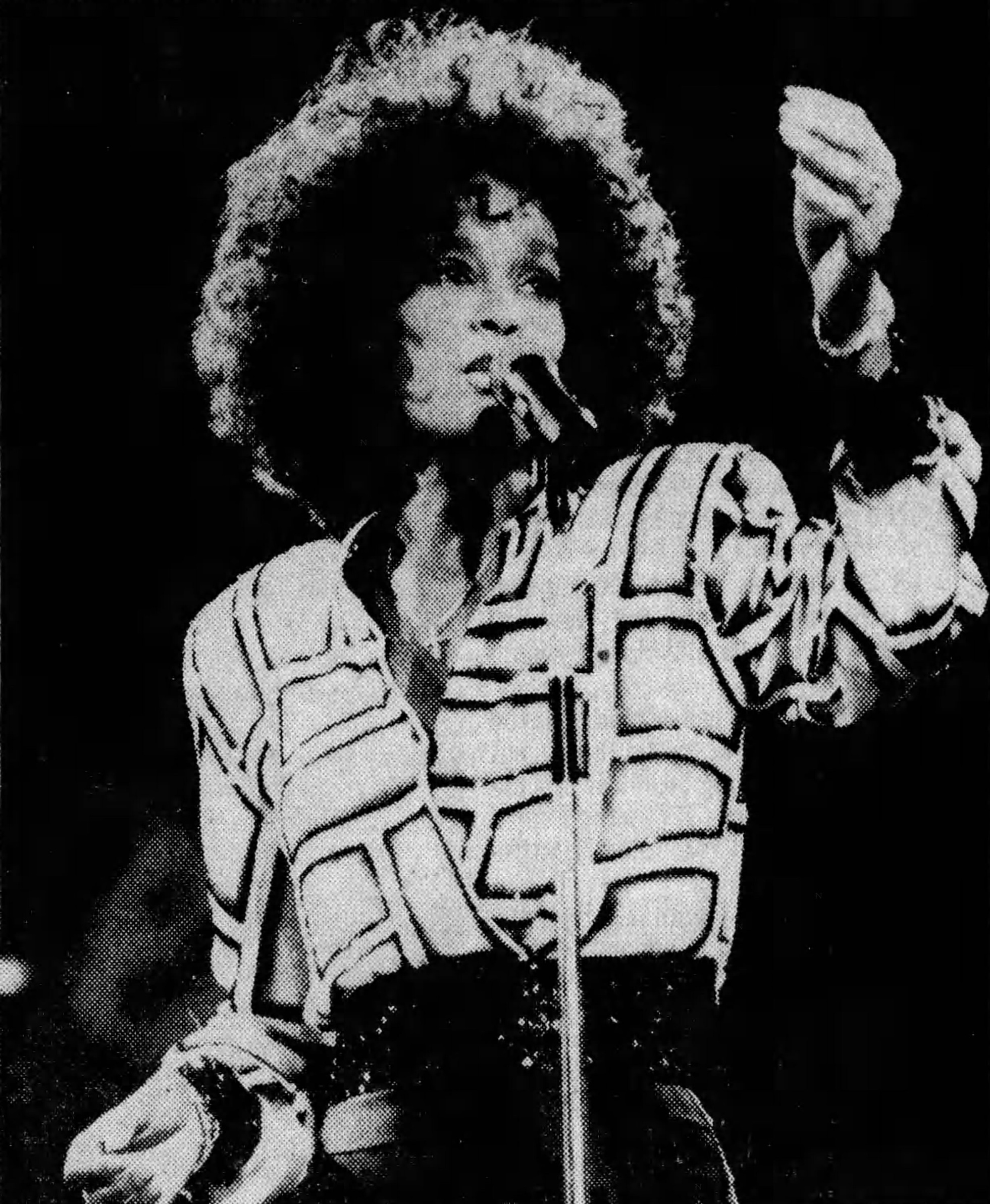
"How Will I Know" and "The Greatest Love of All" by Whitney Houston (pictured) appeared at numbers six and 11, respectively, on the year-end chart.

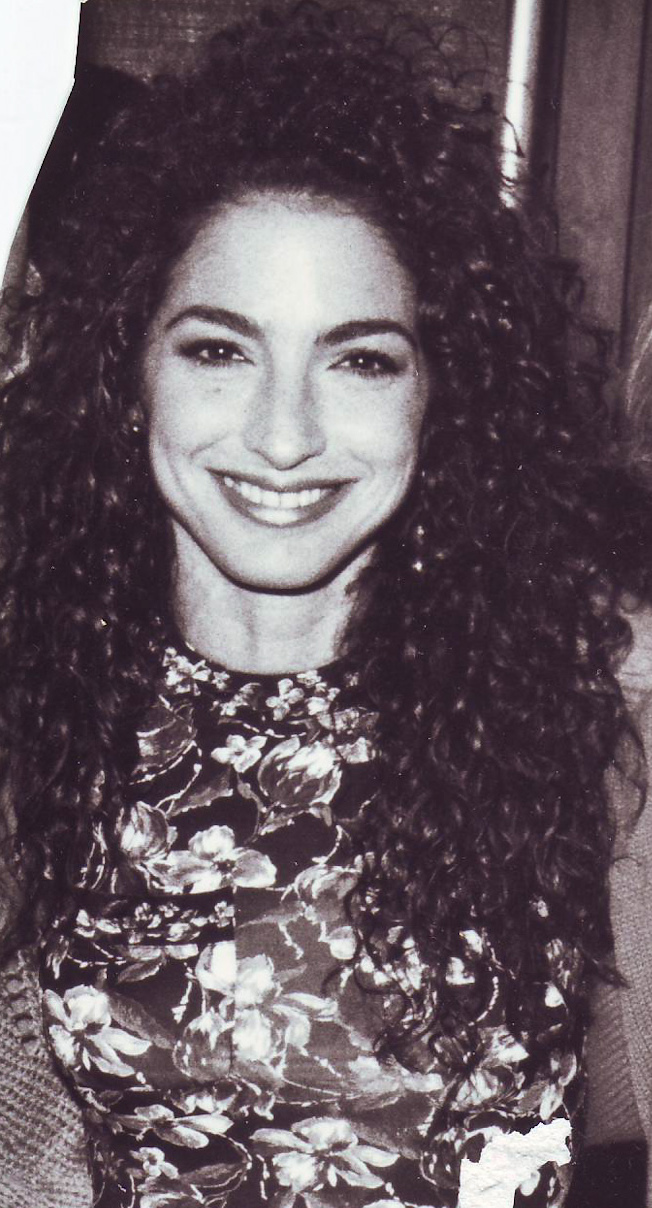
Miami Sound Machine, led by vocalist Gloria Estefan (pictured), had three songs on the year-end chart.

Billboard magazine each year releases a Year-End chart of the most popular songs across all genres called the Hot 100 songs of the year. This is the year-end Hot 100 songs of 1986.

№	Title	Artist(s)
1	"That's What Friends Are For"	Dionne and Friends (Dionne Warwick, Gladys Knight, Elton John and Stevie Wonder)
2	"Say You, Say Me"	Lionel Richie
3	"I Miss You"	Klymaxx
4	"On My Own"	Patti LaBelle and Michael McDonald
5	"Broken Wings"	Mr. Mister
6	"How Will I Know"	Whitney Houston
7	"Party All the Time"	Eddie Murphy
8	"Burning Heart"	Survivor
9	"Kyrie"	Mr. Mister
10	"Addicted to Love"	Robert Palmer
11	"The Greatest Love of All"	Whitney Houston
12	"Secret Lovers"	Atlantic Starr
13	"Friends and Lovers"	Gloria Loring and Carl Anderson
14	"Glory of Love"	Peter Cetera
15	"West End Girls"	Pet Shop Boys
16	"There'll Be Sad Songs (To Make You Cry)"	Billy Ocean
17	"Alive and Kicking"	Simple Minds
18	"Never"	Heart
19	"Kiss"	Prince and The Revolution
20	"Higher Love"	Steve Winwood
21	"Stuck with You"	Huey Lewis and the News
22	"Holding Back the Years"	Simply Red
23	"Sledgehammer"	Peter Gabriel
24	"Sara"	Starship
25	"Human"	The Human League
26	"I Can't Wait"	Nu Shooz
27	"Take My Breath Away"	Berlin
28	"Rock Me Amadeus"	Falco
29	"Papa Don't Preach"	Madonna
30	"You Give Love a Bad Name"	Bon Jovi
31	"When the Going Gets Tough, the Tough Get Going"	Billy Ocean
32	"When I Think of You"	Janet Jackson
33	"These Dreams"	Heart
34	"Don't Forget Me (When I'm Gone)"	Glass Tiger
35	"Live to Tell"	Madonna
36	"Mad About You"	Belinda Carlisle
37	"Something About You"	Level 42
38	"Venus"	Bananarama
39	"Dancing on the Ceiling"	Lionel Richie
40	"Conga"	Miami Sound Machine
41	"True Colors"	Cyndi Lauper
42	"Danger Zone"	Kenny Loggins
43	"What Have You Done For Me Lately"	Janet Jackson
44	"No One Is to Blame"	Howard Jones
45	"Let's Go All the Way"	Sly Fox
46	"I Didn't Mean to Turn You On"	Robert Palmer
47	"Words Get in the Way"	Miami Sound Machine
48	"Manic Monday"	The Bangles
49	"Walk of Life"	Dire Straits
50	"Amanda"	Boston
51	"Two of Hearts"	Stacey Q
52	"Crush on You"	The Jets
53	"If You Leave"	Orchestral Manoeuvres in the Dark
54	"Invisible Touch"	Genesis
55	"The Sweetest Taboo"	Sade
56	"What You Need"	INXS
57	"Talk to Me"	Stevie Nicks
58	"Nasty"	Janet Jackson
59	"Take Me Home Tonight"	Eddie Money
60	"We Don't Have to Take Our Clothes Off"	Jermaine Stewart
61	"All Cried Out"	Lisa Lisa and Cult Jam
62	"Your Love"	The Outfield
63	"I'm Your Man"	Wham!
64	"Perfect Way"	Scritti Politti
65	"Living in America"	James Brown
66	"R.O.C.K. in the U.S.A."	John Cougar Mellencamp
67	"Who's Johnny"	El DeBarge
68	"Word Up!"	Cameo
69	"Why Can't This Be Love"	Van Halen
70	"Silent Running (On Dangerous Ground)"	Mike + The Mechanics
71	"Typical Male"	Tina Turner
72	"Small Town"	John Cougar Mellencamp
73	"Tarzan Boy"	Baltimora
74	"All I Need Is a Miracle"	Mike + The Mechanics
75	"Sweet Freedom"	Michael McDonald
76	"True Blue"	Madonna
77	"Rumors"	Timex Social Club
78	"Life in a Northern Town"	Dream Academy
79	"Bad Boy"	Miami Sound Machine
80	"Sleeping Bag"	ZZ Top
81	"Tonight She Comes"	The Cars
82	"Love Touch"	Rod Stewart
83	"A Love Bizarre"	Sheila E.
84	"Throwing It All Away"	Genesis
85	"Baby Love"	Regina
86	"Election Day"	Arcadia
87	"Nikita"	Elton John
88	"Take Me Home"	Phil Collins
89	"Walk This Way"	Run–D.M.C. featuring Aerosmith
90	"Sweet Love"	Anita Baker
91	"Your Wildest Dreams"	Moody Blues
92	"Spies Like Us"	Paul McCartney
93	"Object of My Desire"	Starpoint
94	"Dreamtime"	Daryl Hall
95	"Tender Love"	Force MDs
96	"King for a Day"	Thompson Twins
97	"Love Will Conquer All"	Lionel Richie
98	"A Different Corner"	George Michael
99	"I'll Be Over You"	Toto
100	"Go Home"	Stevie Wonder

== See also ==
- 1986 in music
- Billboard Year-End Hot Black Singles of 1986
- List of Billboard Hot 100 number ones of 1986
- List of Billboard Hot 100 top-ten singles in 1986
