= Billboard Year-End Hot 100 singles of 1985 =

Ranking of recorded music

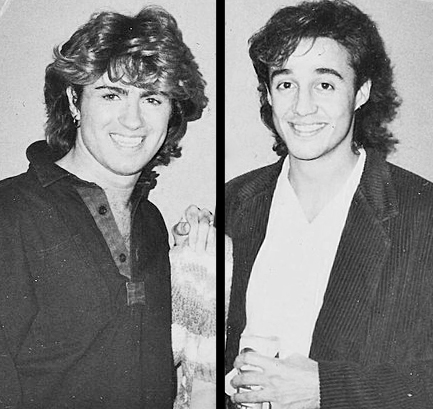
Wham! (pictured) had four songs on the Year-End Hot 100, including the year's biggest hit, Careless Whisper.

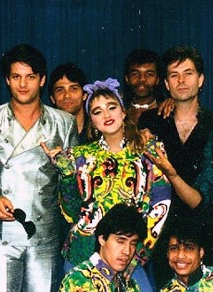
Madonna (pictured) had five songs on the Year-End Hot 100, tied with Phil Collins with the most of any artist in 1985.

This is a list of Billboard magazine's Top Hot 100 singles of 1985.

No.	Title	Artist(s)
1	"Careless Whisper"	George Michael
2	"Like a Virgin"	Madonna
3	"Wake Me Up Before You Go-Go"	Wham!
4	"I Want to Know What Love Is"	Foreigner
5	"I Feel for You"	Chaka Khan
6	"Out of Touch"	Daryl Hall & John Oates
7	"Everybody Wants to Rule the World"	Tears for Fears
8	"Money for Nothing"	Dire Straits
9	"Crazy for You"	Madonna
10	"Take On Me"	a-ha
11	"Everytime You Go Away"	Paul Young
12	"Easy Lover"	Philip Bailey and Phil Collins
13	"Can't Fight This Feeling"	REO Speedwagon
14	"We Built This City"	Starship
15	"The Power of Love"	Huey Lewis and the News
16	"Don't You (Forget About Me)"	Simple Minds
17	"Cherish"	Kool & the Gang
18	"St. Elmo's Fire (Man in Motion)"	John Parr
19	"The Heat Is On"	Glenn Frey
20	"We Are the World"	USA for Africa
21	"Shout"	Tears for Fears
22	"Part-Time Lover"	Stevie Wonder
23	"Saving All My Love for You"	Whitney Houston
24	"Heaven"	Bryan Adams
25	"Everything She Wants"	Wham!
26	"Cool It Now"	New Edition
27	"Miami Vice Theme"	Jan Hammer
28	"Loverboy"	Billy Ocean
29	"Lovergirl"	Teena Marie
30	"You Belong to the City"	Glenn Frey
31	"Oh Sheila"	Ready for the World
32	"Rhythm of the Night"	DeBarge
33	"One More Night"	Phil Collins
34	"Sea of Love"	The Honeydrippers
35	"A View to a Kill"	Duran Duran
36	"The Wild Boys"	Duran Duran
37	"You're the Inspiration"	Chicago
38	"Neutron Dance"	The Pointer Sisters
39	"We Belong"	Pat Benatar
40	"Nightshift"	Commodores
41	"Things Can Only Get Better"	Howard Jones
42	"All I Need"	Jack Wagner
43	"Freeway of Love"	Aretha Franklin
44	"Never Surrender"	Corey Hart
45	"Sussudio"	Phil Collins
46	"Strut"	Sheena Easton
47	"You Give Good Love"	Whitney Houston
48	"The Search Is Over"	Survivor
49	"Missing You"	Diana Ross
50	"Separate Lives"	Phil Collins and Marilyn Martin
51	"Raspberry Beret"	Prince & the Revolution
52	"Suddenly"	Billy Ocean
53	"The Boys of Summer"	Don Henley
54	"One Night in Bangkok"	Murray Head
55	"If You Love Somebody Set Them Free"	Sting
56	"Obsession"	Animotion
57	"We Don't Need Another Hero (Thunderdome)"	Tina Turner
58	"Material Girl"	Madonna
59	"Better Be Good to Me"	Tina Turner
60	"Head over Heels"	Tears for Fears
61	"Axel F"	Harold Faltermeyer
62	"Smooth Operator"	Sade
63	"In My House"	Mary Jane Girls
64	"Don't Lose My Number"	Phil Collins
65	"All Through the Night"	Cyndi Lauper
66	"Run to You"	Bryan Adams
67	"Glory Days"	Bruce Springsteen
68	"Voices Carry"	'Til Tuesday
69	"Misled"	Kool & the Gang
70	"Would I Lie to You?"	Eurythmics
71	"Be Near Me"	ABC
72	"No More Lonely Nights"	Paul McCartney
73	"I Can't Hold Back"	Survivor
74	"Summer of '69"	Bryan Adams
75	"Walking on Sunshine"	Katrina and the Waves
76	"Freedom"	Wham!
77	"Too Late for Goodbyes"	Julian Lennon
78	"Valotte"	Julian Lennon
79	"Some Like It Hot"	The Power Station
80	"Solid"	Ashford & Simpson
81	"Angel"	Madonna
82	"I'm on Fire"	Bruce Springsteen
83	"Method of Modern Love"	Daryl Hall & John Oates
84	"Lay Your Hands on Me"	Thompson Twins
85	"Who's Holding Donna Now"	DeBarge
86	"Lonely Ol' Night"	John Cougar Mellencamp
87	"What About Love"	Heart
88	"California Girls"	David Lee Roth
89	"Fresh"	Kool & the Gang
90	"Do What You Do"	Jermaine Jackson
91	"Jungle Love"	The Time
92	"Born in the U.S.A."	Bruce Springsteen
93	"Private Dancer"	Tina Turner
94	"Who's Zoomin' Who"	Aretha Franklin
95	"Fortress Around Your Heart"	Sting
96	"Penny Lover"	Lionel Richie
97	"All She Wants to Do Is Dance"	Don Henley
98	"Dress You Up"	Madonna
99	"Sentimental Street"	Night Ranger
100	"Sugar Walls"	Sheena Easton

== See also ==
- 1985 in music
- Billboard Year-End Hot Black Singles of 1985
- List of Billboard Hot 100 number-one singles of 1985
- List of Billboard Hot 100 top-ten singles in 1985
