= 9.9 =

American R&B group

9.9 was an American R&B group formed in the mid-1980s. The group consisted of members Margo Thunder, Leslie Jones (1962–2013), and Wanda Perry. The group formed in 1985 in Boston, Massachusetts. They signed to RCA Records and released their first album 9.9 and the single "All of Me for All of You". The single reached #5 on the Hot R&B/Hip-Hop Songs chart and #51 on the Billboard Hot 100 singles chart.

== Formation and history ==
Thunder was signed by Capitol Records in the 1970s and recorded the single "Expressway to Your Heart". Perry, Thunder and Jones were all friends and students at Madison Park High School, a school in Roxbury, Massachusetts. The trio were all in the same music class in the school. As a trio, the members performed on street corners and at Boston Common. Eventually, they answered an advertisement in the Boston Phoenix and began performing in clubs under the name Margo Thunder and Intrigue. Perry, Thunder and Jones were backing vocalists for Joe Frazier. Eventually, their debut album 9.9 was released in Summer 1985.

9.9's album reached #79 on the U.S. Billboard 200 and #15 on the Top R&B/Hip-Hop Albums chart. 9.9 released a second single titled "I Like the Way You Dance." The group performed on Soul Train, American Bandstand, and Solid Gold. They also provided backing vocals for a single with Patti LaBelle titled "Shy". The group continued until 1987, when disputes over material, production and personal matters forced the group to disband. Leslie Jones died on July 5, 2013; she was survived by two children and four grandchildren. Wanda Perry is married with two children. She is also a minister and has recorded several gospel albums available on iTunes. Margo Thunder formed a female group named Lady Soul, which recorded a song and video for the Sister Act soundtrack titled "If My Sisters in Trouble". Margo is recording as a solo act and released a single titled "Mistreated".

== Discography ==
=== Albums ===
Year	Title	Chart positions	
Year	Title	US	US R&B
1985	9.9	79	15

=== Singles ===
Year	Title	Peak chart positions			
Year	Title	US	US R&B	US Dance	UK
1985	"All of Me for All of You"	51	5	47	53
1985	"I Like the Way You Dance"	―	30	―	―
