= List of Billboard Hot 100 top-ten singles in 1985 =

This is a list of singles that have peaked in the Top 10 of the Billboard Hot 100 during 1985.

Overall, a total of 113 singles hit the top-ten, a big rise from 99 top-ten singles from the previous year, including 27 number-one singles and 10 number-two singles.

Phil Collins and Madonna each had five top-ten hits in 1985, tying them for the most top-ten hits during the year.

== Top-ten singles ==
- (#) – 1985 Year-end top 10 single position and rank ("Wake Me Up Before You Go-Go" by Wham! and "I Feel For You" by Chaka Khan reached #3 and #5, respectively on the Year-end Hot 100 single chart of 1985.)

List of Billboard Hot 100 top ten singles which peaked in 1985
Top ten entry date	Single	Artist(s)	Peak	Peak date	Weeks in top ten
Singles from 1984
December 8	"We Belong"	Pat Benatar	5	January 5	7
December 8	"Cool It Now"	New Edition	4	January 5	6
December 8	"Sea of Love"	The Honeydrippers	3	January 5	6
December 22	"All I Need"	Jack Wagner	2	January 12	6
December 22	"Valotte"	Julian Lennon	9	January 12	4
Singles from 1985
January 5	"Run to You"	Bryan Adams	6	January 19	4
January 5	"You're the Inspiration"	Chicago	3	January 19	6
January 12	"Born in the U.S.A."	Bruce Springsteen	9	January 19	2
January 19	"I Want to Know What Love Is" (#4)	Foreigner	1	February 2	8
January 19	"Easy Lover"	Philip Bailey and Phil Collins	2	February 2	7
January 19	"Careless Whisper" (#1)	Wham! featuring George Michael	1	February 16	9
January 26	"The Boys of Summer"	Don Henley	5	February 9	4
January 26	"Loverboy"	Billy Ocean	2	February 23	6
January 26	"I Would Die 4 U"	Prince and the Revolution	8	February 2	3
February 2	"Method of Modern Love"	Hall & Oates	5	February 16	4
February 2	"Neutron Dance"	The Pointer Sisters	6	February 16	6
February 16	"Can't Fight This Feeling"	REO Speedwagon	1	March 9	8
February 16	"The Heat Is On"	Glenn Frey	2	March 16	6
February 16	"California Girls"	David Lee Roth	3	March 2	5
February 23	"Sugar Walls"	Sheena Easton	9	March 2	3
March 2	"The Old Man Down the Road"	John Fogerty	10	March 2	1
March 9	"Material Girl"	Madonna	2	March 23	6
March 9	"Too Late for Goodbyes"	Julian Lennon	5	March 23	5
March 9	"Misled"	Kool & the Gang	10	March 9	1
March 16	"One More Night"	Phil Collins	1	March 30	6
March 16	"Lovergirl"	Teena Marie	4	March 30	5
March 16	"Private Dancer"	Tina Turner	7	March 23	3
March 16	"Relax"	Frankie Goes to Hollywood	10	March 16	2
March 23	"High on You"	Survivor	8	March 23	2
March 23	"Only the Young"	Journey	9	March 23	1
March 30	"We Are the World"	USA for Africa	1	April 13	8
March 30	"Crazy for You" (#9)	Madonna	1	May 11	9
March 30	"Nightshift"	Commodores	3	April 20	6
April 6	"I'm on Fire"	Bruce Springsteen	6	April 13	4
April 6	"Rhythm of the Night"	DeBarge	3	April 27	7
April 13	"Obsession"	Animotion	6	May 4	5
April 13	"Missing You"	Diana Ross	10	April 13	2
April 20	"Don't You (Forget About Me)"	Simple Minds	1	May 18	8
April 20	"One Night in Bangkok"	Murray Head	3	May 18	6
April 27	"Some Like It Hot"	The Power Station	6	May 11	5
April 27	"All She Wants to Do Is Dance"	Don Henley	9	May 4	2
May 4	"Smooth Operator"	Sade	5	May 18	5
May 11	"Everything She Wants"	Wham!	1	May 25	6
May 11	"Everybody Wants to Rule the World" (#7)	Tears for Fears	1	June 8	8
May 18	"Axel F"	Harold Faltermeyer	3	June 1	5
May 25	"Suddenly"	Billy Ocean	4	June 8	4
May 25	"Things Can Only Get Better"	Howard Jones	5	June 15	6
June 1	"Heaven"	Bryan Adams	1	June 22	6
June 1	"In My House"	Mary Jane Girls	7	June 8	5
June 1	"Fresh"	Kool & the Gang	9	June 8	2
June 8	"Walking on Sunshine"	Katrina and the Waves	9	June 22	3
June 15	"Sussudio"	Phil Collins	1	July 6	6
June 15	"Angel"	Madonna	5	June 29	4
June 22	"Raspberry Beret"	Prince and the Revolution	2	July 20	6
June 22	"A View to a Kill"	Duran Duran	1	July 13	6
June 22	"The Search Is Over"	Survivor	4	July 13	5
June 29	"Would I Lie to You?"	Eurythmics	5	July 13	4
July 6	"You Give Good Love"	Whitney Houston	3	July 27	6
July 6	"Everytime You Go Away"	Paul Young	1	July 27	8
July 6	"Voices Carry"	'Til Tuesday	8	July 13	2
July 13	"Glory Days"	Bruce Springsteen	5	August 3	5
July 13	"The Goonies 'R' Good Enough"	Cyndi Lauper	10	July 13	1
July 20	"If You Love Somebody Set Them Free"	Sting	3	August 3	6
July 20	"Shout"	Tears for Fears	1	August 3	7
July 27	"Sentimental Street"	Night Ranger	8	July 27	2
July 27	"Never Surrender"	Corey Hart	3	August 17	6
July 27	"Get It On (Bang a Gong)"	The Power Station	9	August 3	3
August 3	"The Power of Love"	Huey Lewis and the News	1	August 24	8
August 3	"Who's Holding Donna Now"	DeBarge	6	August 10	3
August 10	"Freeway of Love"	Aretha Franklin	3	August 31	6
August 17	"St. Elmo's Fire (Man in Motion)"	John Parr	1	September 7	7
August 17	"Summer of '69"	Bryan Adams	5	August 31	4
August 17	"We Don't Need Another Hero (Thunderdome)"	Tina Turner	2	September 14	6
August 24	"What About Love"	Heart	10	August 24	1
August 31	"Cherish"	Kool & the Gang	2	September 21	7
August 31	"You're Only Human (Second Wind)"	Billy Joel	9	August 31	2
August 31	"Money for Nothing" (#8)	Dire Straits	1	September 21	8
September 7	"Don't Lose My Number"	Phil Collins	4	September 28	4
September 7	"Pop Life"	Prince and the Revolution	7	September 21	3
September 14	"Freedom"	Wham!	3	September 28	4
September 14	"Invincible (Theme from The Legend of Billie Jean)"	Pat Benatar	10	September 14	1
September 21	"Oh Sheila"	Ready for the World	1	October 12	6
September 21	"Dress You Up"	Madonna	5	October 5	4
September 28	"Take On Me" (#10)	A-ha	1	October 19	7
September 28	"Saving All My Love for You"	Whitney Houston	1	October 26	7
September 28	"Lonely Ol' Night"	John Cougar Mellencamp	6	October 12	5
October 5	"Dancing in the Street"	Mick Jagger and David Bowie	7	October 12	3
October 5	"Part-Time Lover"	Stevie Wonder	1	November 2	8
October 12	"Miami Vice Theme"	Jan Hammer	1	November 9	7
October 19	"Fortress Around Your Heart"	Sting	8	October 26	3
October 19	"Head Over Heels"	Tears for Fears	3	November 9	6
October 26	"I'm Goin' Down"	Bruce Springsteen	9	October 26	1
October 26	"You Belong to the City"	Glenn Frey	2	November 16	7
November 2	"We Built This City"	Starship	1	November 16	7
November 2	"Lovin' Every Minute of It"	Loverboy	9	November 2	1
November 2	"Be Near Me"	ABC	9	November 9	3
November 9	"Separate Lives"	Phil Collins and Marilyn Martin	1	November 30	9
November 9	"Lay Your Hands on Me"	Thompson Twins	6	November 23	4
November 16	"Broken Wings"	Mr. Mister	1	December 7	9
November 16	"Never"	Heart	4	December 7	5
November 23	"Who's Zoomin' Who"	Aretha Franklin	7	November 30	3
November 30	"Election Day"	Arcadia	6	December 14	6
November 30	"Party All the Time"	Eddie Murphy	2	December 28	9
November 30	"Sleeping Bag"	ZZ Top	8	December 14	4
December 7	"Say You, Say Me"	Lionel Richie	1	December 21	9
December 14	"Alive and Kicking"	Simple Minds	3	December 28	6
December 14	"I Miss You"	Klymaxx	5	December 28	7
December 21	"Small Town"	John Cougar Mellencamp	6	December 28	5

=== 1984 peaks ===
List of Billboard Hot 100 top ten singles in 1985 which peaked in 1984
Top ten entry date	Single	Artist(s)	Peak	Peak date	Weeks in top ten
November 10	"Out of Touch" (#6)	Hall & Oates	1	December 8	9
December 1	"The Wild Boys"	Duran Duran	2	December 15	8
December 15	"Like a Virgin" (#2)	Madonna	1	December 22	9

=== 1986 peaks ===
List of Billboard Hot 100 top ten singles in 1985 which peaked in 1986
Top ten entry date	Single	Artist(s)	Peak	Peak date	Weeks in top ten
December 21	"That's What Friends Are For"	Dionne and Friends	1	January 18	10
December 28	"Tonight She Comes"	The Cars	7	January 11	4

== See also ==
- 1985 in music
- List of Billboard Hot 100 number ones of 1985
- Billboard Year-End Hot 100 singles of 1985
