= Saving All My Love for You =

- US vinyl edition

Single by Whitney Houston

from the album Whitney Houston
- B-side: "Nobody Loves Me Like You Do"; "All at Once"; "Greatest Love of All"; "How Will I Know"
- Released: August 13, 1985
- Recorded: August 1984
- Genre: R&B; soul; quiet storm
- Length: 3:58
- Label: Arista
- Songwriters: Michael Masser; Gerry Goffin
- Producer: Michael Masser

Whitney Houston singles chronology
"All at Once" (1985)	"Saving All My Love for You" (1985)	"Thinking About You" (1985)

Music video
- "Saving All My Love for You" on YouTube

"Saving All My Love for You" is a song written by Michael Masser and Gerry Goffin. Originally recorded by Marilyn McCoo and Billy Davis Jr. for their album Marilyn & Billy in 1978, it was revisited by American singer Whitney Houston, who recorded the ballad for her self-titled debut studio album in 1985. It was released on August 13, 1985 by Arista Records, as the second single from the album in the United States, and third worldwide after "All at Once".

Allegedly inspired by her relationship with singer Jermaine Jackson, Houston's rendition of "Saving All My Love for You" garnered positive critical response, with reviewers praising its melodious production and her vocal performance, and picked it as one of the album's highlights.

The song sold approximately 5 million copies worldwide and became a global success and represented a commercial breakthrough for Houston, topping the charts in four countries and reaching the top 10 in various other regions. It became her first song to top the US Billboard Hot 100, staying there for one week, and is certified double platinum by the RIAA for sales of over 2 million copies.

At the 28th Annual Grammy Awards, the song won Houston her first Grammy for Best Female Pop Vocal Performance. Houston's rendition is considered one of her greatest recordings and is regarded by some as one of the best and important songs of the 1980s.

== Background ==
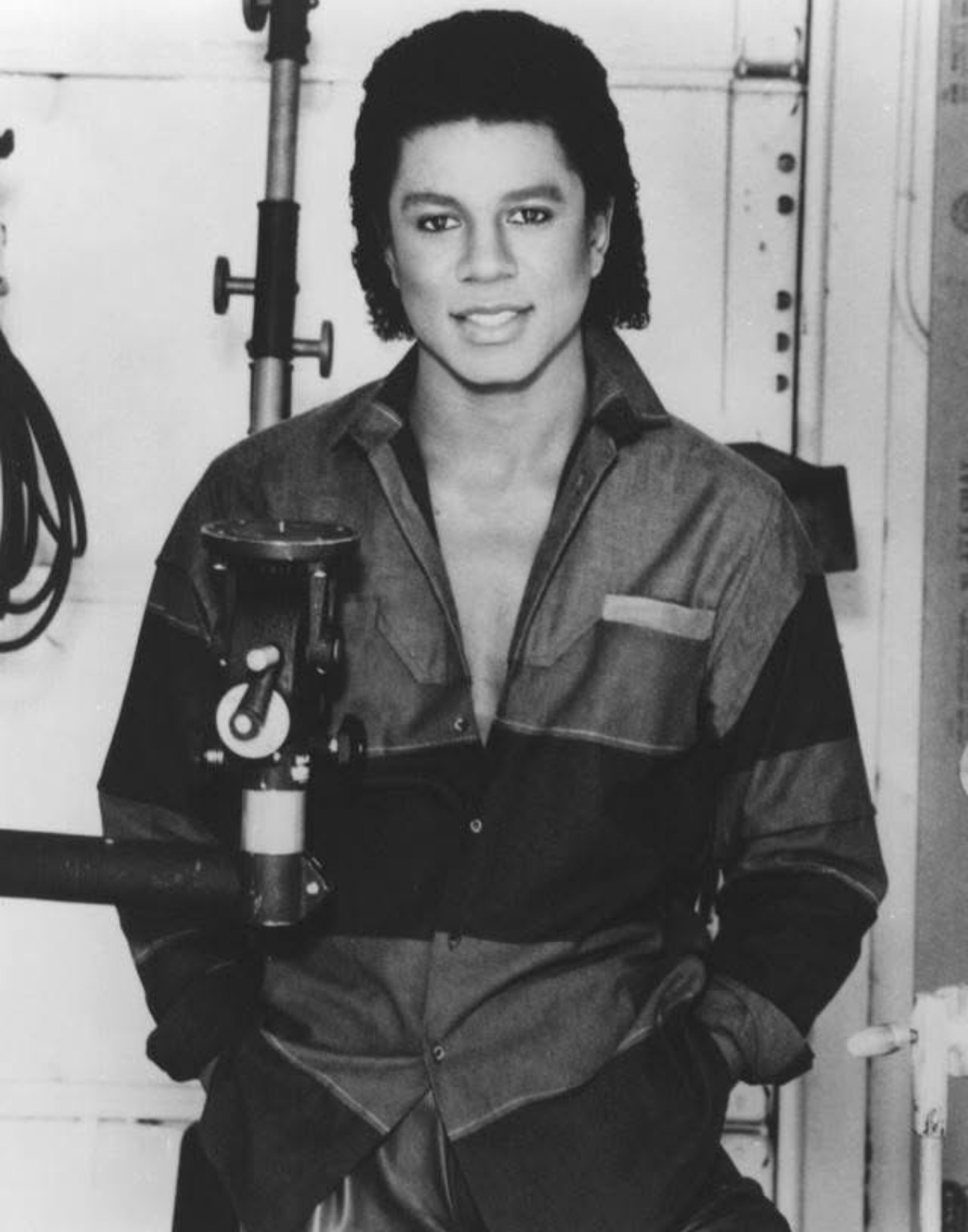
Jermaine Jackson (pictured in 1984) inspired the recording and music video of "Saving All My Love for You".

In April 1983, Whitney Houston signed her first recording contract with Arista Records. That month, she taped her first national television performance for the Merv Griffin Show. During this period, Houston and label boss Clive Davis sought out producers for recording on Houston's debut album with many pulling out due to prior commitments.

Following the airing of her Merv Griffin performance, however, offers began pouring in. One of the first producers they came in contact with was former Jackson 5 member Jermaine Jackson, who had recently signed with Arista after 14 years recording for Motown. Though Jackson had limited production experience, having mostly produced for the band Switch, Houston agreed to work with Jackson on a series of duets.

The young New Jersey-based singer, 19, flew to California shortly afterwards to record with Jackson. Not too long afterwards, it was reported that Houston began a torrid, secretive one-year affair with Jackson, who was nine years Houston's senior and married to Hazel Gordy, daughter of Motown founder Berry Gordy, with whom he had two children with at the time.

According to Houston's best friend and former lover Robyn Crawford, the singer was smitten with Jackson, 28. Though initially reluctant to share details of her relationship with Jackson, Houston told Crawford that Jackson and his wife were separated and seeking a divorce; Crawford didn't believe it, however.

According to Crawford, Jackson was "smuggled into hotel rooms" with Houston, worked late nights on duets with her and the 20-year-old Houston even had a nickname for Jackson, "Ji". The affair also reportedly alarmed Jackson's brother Michael, who warned him that the affair could destroy both his and Houston's careers.

A year later, in 1984, Houston and Jackson appeared on TV together performing on the soap opera, As the World Turns. According to Robyn Crawford, the affair broke when Houston was angered that Jackson had reneged on a promise to give her and Crawford tickets to see the Jacksons's Victory Tour at Madison Square Garden around July 1984, which led to Houston going off on vacation in Antigua by herself and refusing to give Jackson her phone number. Others reported that Houston angrily broke off the affair because Jackson wouldn't leave his wife Hazel.

Publicly, Jackson has denied an affair with Houston had occurred though he later admitted that the constant recordings with Houston had him deeply infatuated with the young artist, writing in 2012: "These were turning into duets between temptation and forbidden love [...] I arrived on those days with butterflies, because the whole experience of being around Whitney was intoxicating [...] it became increasingly hard to sing love songs with all that emotion and unspoken passion between us."

== Recording and production ==
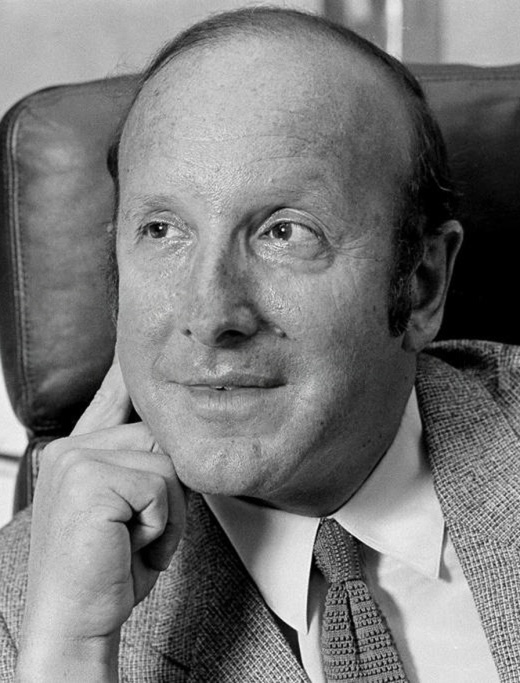
Clive Davis (pictured in 1980) initially didn't want to have Houston record "Saving All My Love for You" calling the song "old fashioned".

Around the same time Houston and Jackson began working together, producer Michael Masser caught a performance of Houston after he was invited to attend the Manhattan cabaret club Sweetwaters by Davis after telling him Houston was covering his 1977 composition "The Greatest Love of All".

Upon viewing the performance, Houston told him that the song was one of her favorite recordings. Masser agreed to work with the singer on her debut after getting the okay to put Houston in another duet, this one with another older musician, Teddy Pendergrass, on a ballad called "Hold Me".

Houston and Masser worked on several songs together following the production of "Hold Me", including the Jeffrey Osborne-composed ballad, "All at Once", recorded in July 1984, just around the time of Houston's breakup with Jackson. The following August, Masser presented Davis and Houston the ballad "Saving All My Love for You", which Masser composed with lyricist Gerry Goffin in 1977 originally for former 5th Dimension members Marilyn McCoo and Billy Davis Jr., with McCoo singing the song. Featured on the married couple's second album, Marilyn & Billy, a year later, their version wasn't released while the album itself performed poorly on the charts. At first, Davis was reluctant to have Houston record the track, with Davis considering the jazzy-inflected track "too old fashioned".

Still, Houston agreed to record the song. According to some reports, after the first recording was sent to Davis, the producer rejected it, thinking the song had Houston sounding "too much like Aretha". Kenneth Reynolds, the label's president of public relations, stated that "anything that was too black-sounding" was taken back and re-recorded.

After re-recording it to get the right emotionally vulnerable-tailored take from Houston, the producer guaranteed her that it would become "a woman's song", meaning that women will feel a special affinity for the song.

When Masser heard that another single was being considered for the next release off Houston's debut following the success of "You Give Good Love", he made a friendly wager with Davis during one of Houston's performances at the Roxy Theatre in Los Angeles in May 1985. He proposed that if all the women got on their feet when Houston sung "Saving All My Love for You", then Davis would agree that it should be the next single. Ultimately, the song was released as the second single in the United States and third single worldwide.

== Composition and lyrics ==
Houston's rendition of "Saving All My Love for You" is a soul and R&B song, composed in the key of A major, having a slow tempo of 84 beats per minute. Houston's vocal range on the song extends from the low note of F♯_{3} to the high note of F♯_{5}.

The song features a saxophone solo by Tom Scott and its lyrics describe the thoughts of a young woman preparing for the arrival of her married lover.

Dave Heaton of PopMatters wrote that Houston sings some parts with bittersweet lightness ("that's just an old fantasy") and other parts with urgent heaviness ("tonight is the night"), which he considers exactly right for carrying the feelings in the song.

The song is also notable for adding extra lyrics that were not featured in the 1978 original ("no other woman is gonna love you more...").

The song caused controversy due to its theme of having an affair with a married man. Houston's religiously devout mother, Cissy Houston, did not at all like the scenario described in the lyrics, claiming that the song's message would reflect badly on her daughter. However, Houston herself confessed years later, "I was going through a terrible love affair [with Jermaine Jackson]. He was married, and that will never work out for anybody. Never, no way."

== Reception ==
=== Critical response ===
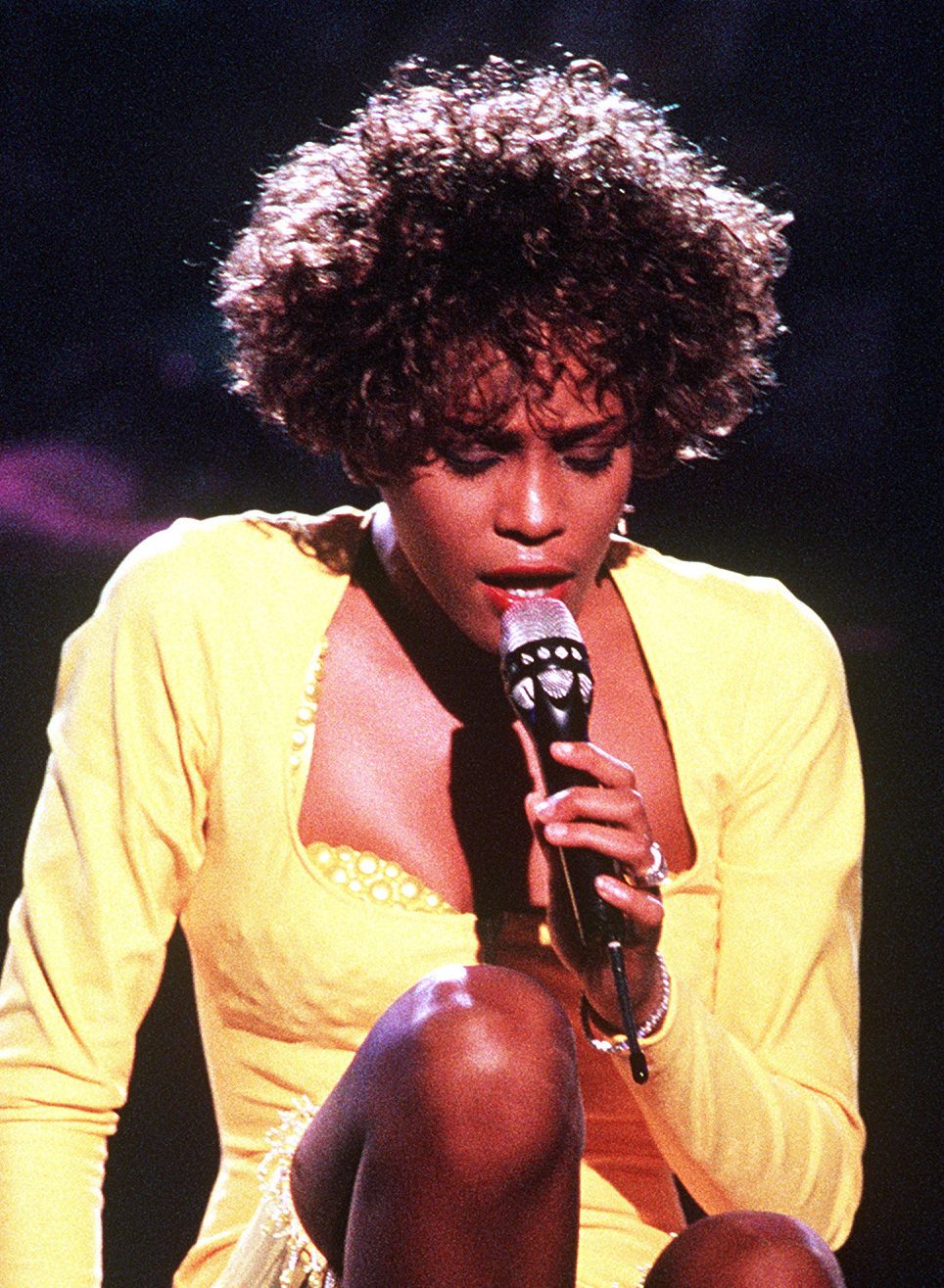
Houston performing the song during her HBO-televised concert Welcome Home Heroes with Whitney Houston

"Saving All My Love for You" received critical acclaim. Stephen Thomas Erlewine of AllMusic picked the song as a highlight on the album, writing that the song "burns slowly and seductively." Dave Heaton of PopMatters praised Houston for "singing as 'the other woman', ratcheting up the drama without overdoing it." Liam Lacey of The Globe and Mail wrote that "Saving All My Love for You", "Greatest Love of All" and "Hold Me" "are some of the loveliest pop singing on vinyl since the glory days of Dionne Warwick."

Author Ted Cox called it a "state-of-the-art mid-80s ballad" that proved Houston "belong[ed] in the same league of the great singers." Sputnikmusic called it "the sexiest, most romantic song on the record." Brad Wete of Vibe called it "goliath", writing that the song "was a fresh serving of precocious talent compared to 1985's mildly flavored R&B bluffet."

Tom Breihan of Stereogum wrote of Houston's performance in the song:

"Houston sings the absolute hell out of this song, giving it nuance that isn't there on paper. Early on, she's sweet and tender. She sings her lines with a sort of cocktail-jazz reserve. But as the song builds, anger and determination creep in. Houston's voice gets deeper and throatier. As the song climaxes, she puts her gospel training to work, putting emotional force into what she's singing: "Cuz to-night! Is the night! That I'm feel-ing awwwlll-right!" The words aren't confrontational, but the delivery is. Houston sounds like she's made up her mind that this guy is going to give her what she wants. It's unspoken, but you get the idea that things are about to go very wrong if she doesn't get it. On top of that, Houston uses the song to show off her voice -- the creamy high notes, the expert timing, the way that she can convey a building sense of drama."

Classic Pop highlighted the song as an essential Houston song, writing "Whatever about its muddy morality, [the song] is four minutes of pure romance". Los Angeles Times praised her vocal performance, writing that, "it should mean a cinch Grammy nomination."

=== Chart performance ===
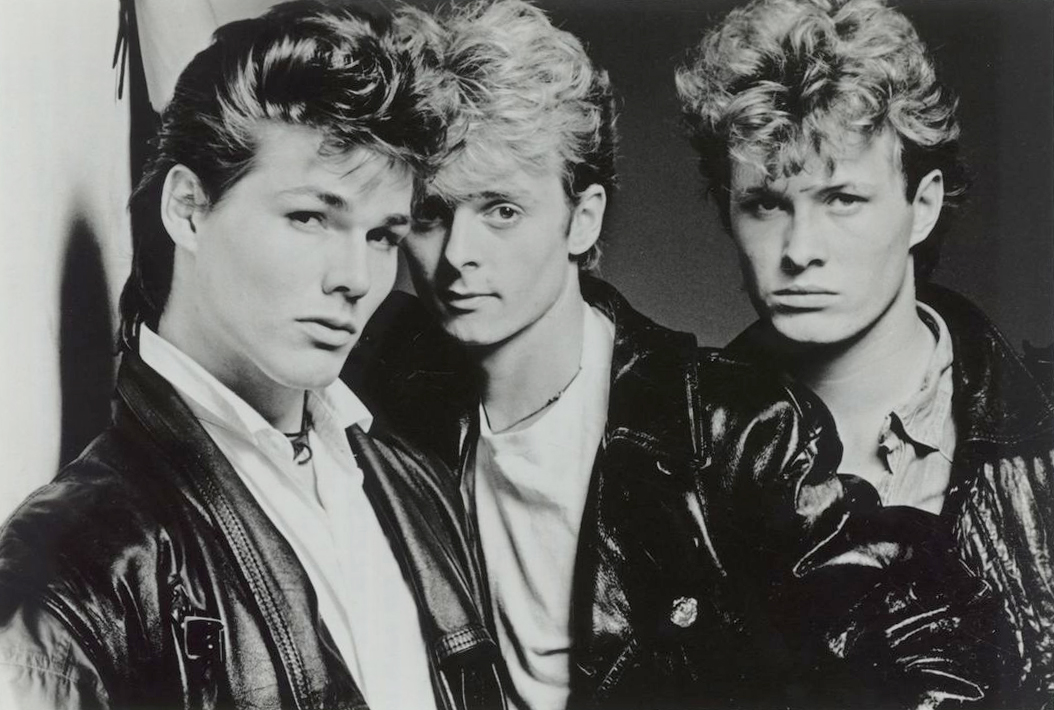
"Saving All My Love for You" replaced "Take on Me" by the band a-ha (pictured in 1984) at number one on the Billboard Hot 100.

==== North America ====
Following the peak of "You Give Good Love" in June 1985, Houston's version of "Saving All My Love for You" first entered the Billboard Hot Black Singles chart for the week of June 29, 1985 at number 84. In its fourth week (July 20), it entered the top forty at number 30. On the August 10th issue of Billboard, the song entered the top ten of the chart at number 6 in its seventh week.

Five weeks later, it became Houston's second consecutive number one single on the Hot Black Singles chart for the week of September 7, 1985, replacing Aretha Franklin's "Freeway of Love". It would eventually spend a cumulative total of 21 weeks on the chart, including nine weeks in the top ten, and eventually ranked number 5 on Billboard Year-End Top Black Singles chart.

The song entered the Billboard Hot 100 on August 17, 1985 at number 53, jumping to number 39 the following week (August 24) and reaching the Top 10 five weeks later on the week of September 28. On the October 19, 1985 issue, it leapt to number two; with that accomplishment, Houston only became the third female artist in history to have their first two official chart singles reaching the top three of the Hot 100 after Cyndi Lauper and Petula Clark.

The single reached the number-one spot a week later, on October 26, 1985 replacing A-ha's "Take On Me" at the top spot and would become the first of seven record-setting consecutive number-one singles in the United States for Houston; a record that still holds. The single eventually spent fifteen weeks in the top forty and seven weeks in the top ten, out of a total of 22 weeks on the Hot 100 overall. It ranked number 23 on the Billboard Year-End Hot 100 Singles chart.

The song entered the Billboard Hot Adult Contemporary chart on August 17 at number 31. The following week, it vaulted to the top 20 and entered the top five for the week of September 14 in its fifth week. Four weeks later, it topped the Hot Adult Contemporary chart for the week of October 5, 1985, replacing Kool & the Gang's "Cherish" at the top spot and staying at the top for three consecutive weeks, becoming Houston's first number one single on the chart.

It was Houston's first single to top three major Billboard charts and her first of four "triple-crown" Billboard number one singles. On the Cashbox charts, it became Houston's second consecutive top five single peaking at number five on its Top 100 Singles chart while becoming her second chart topper on its Top Black Contemporary Singles chart.

In Canada, it became Houston's second consecutive top ten single, peaking at number eight for the week of November 9, 1985.

==== Europe ====
The song also became a global hit, hitting number-one or the Top 10 in various countries around the world.

In the United Kingdom, it entered the UK singles chart at number 60 on November 10, 1985. The following week, it vaulted into the top forty at number 23, becoming Houston's first top 40 UK hit. It then shot to the top ten at number 9 in its third week, earning her first top ten single in the UK. Two weeks later, the song hit number-one on December 8, 1985, replacing "I'm Your Man" by Wham! at the top spot, spending two weeks at the top. The single went on to become one of the top 25 best-selling singles of 1985 in the UK, and has since sold 740,000 copies. In 2012, Dan Lane of the Official Charts Company listed "Houston's Top 20 Biggest Selling Tracks in the UK to Date" and "Saving All My Love for You" was placed at number 3, only losing to "I Will Always Love You" and "I Wanna Dance with Somebody". It also topped the Irish Singles Chart, becoming her first chart-topper there as well.

The song was also a success in Switzerland, peaking at number 5, while in France, the song charted two times in different years. Firstly, the song charted when it was originally released in 1986, debuting at number 50 and peaking at number 11, while in 2012 (after Houston's death), the song peaked at number 39. In Austria, Germany, the Netherlands and Switzerland, it peaked inside the top twenty. In Norway and Iceland, it reached the top ten in both countries. The song also became Houston's first number one single in Luxembourg. As a result of the European success, it became Houston's first entry into the Eurochart Hot 100, peaking at number six in early 1986.

==== Oceania ====
In New Zealand, the song debuted at number 45, on November 3, 1985. It kept on climbing in the following two weeks, until it peaked at number 6, before dropping to number 8. However, on December 8, 1985, the song reached a new peak of number 5. It was also a hit in Australia, where it peaked at number 20, becoming her first top twenty hit in that country.

== Music video ==
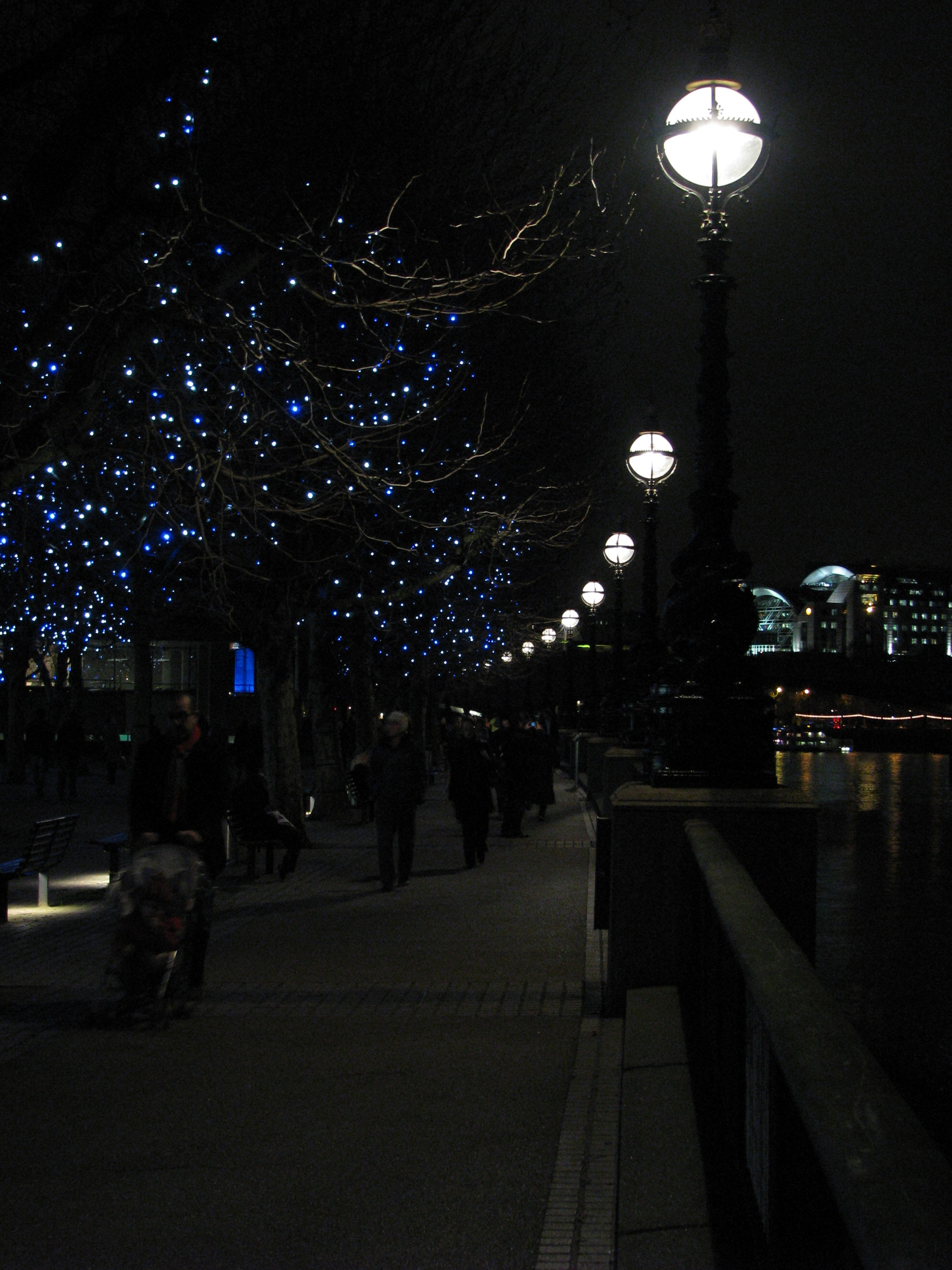
Parts of the "Saving All My Love for You" music video were filmed at London's South Bank.

The music video was directed by Stuart Orme and was filmed in London, where Houston was doing a promotional tour. The narrative for the music video follows the song's theme: Houston's character is a recording artist who is emotionally involved with her married producer, played by American actor Ricco Ross. By the finale, he has returned to his wife, played by Sheila Ming-Burgess, and family, leaving her (the "other woman") romantically out in the cold. Its final part shows Houston walking along South Bank in London.

At the time of release, the adultery theme of the video generated much media controversy, which led Houston to insist, "I could never see myself in that position. I wouldn't just take whatever someone wants to give to me, especially if I am giving a lot to him but not getting that much back. I could never find myself in that situation, but someone else might. The video tells a story but it's by no means my story."

Many who viewed the music video noticed the striking similarities in the looks of Ross and Jermaine Jackson. Years later, Jackson wrote in his 2012 memoirs, You Are Not Alone: Michael, Through a Brother's Eyes, "in 1985, I received a phone call from someone close to Whitney telling me that she was releasing [the song]. Like [brother] Michael, she expressed herself through song. And when I watched the official music video, I soon realized it was all autobiographical with its parallels - and coded message - to what we had recently shared in the studio together. I guess we both left a deep and abiding impression on one another, and her positive impact has never left me."

Despite the controversy, the music video, much like the song, also became a hit. It played on heavy rotation on the music video channels BET and VH1, as well as the popular TBS music video show, Night Tracks. It was also the first music video of Houston's to be played on MTV after the channel had initially rejected her previous video for "You Give Good Love" for being "too R&B" but played the video for "Saving All My Love For You" because the song was too popular to ignore. Houston later remarked, "I love it when they have no choice [but to play it]", in a 2001 MTV interview.

Due to the success of the music video in the US, the video topped the Cashbox Top 30 Music Videos chart in early November 1985 for a week, replacing "Oh Sheila" by American R&B band Ready for the World. The video also became heavily played in European countries. The video won Favorite Soul/R&B Video at the American Music Awards of 1986. As of July 2026, the video has garnered over 100 million views on YouTube, remaining one of her most popular videos.

== Live performances ==
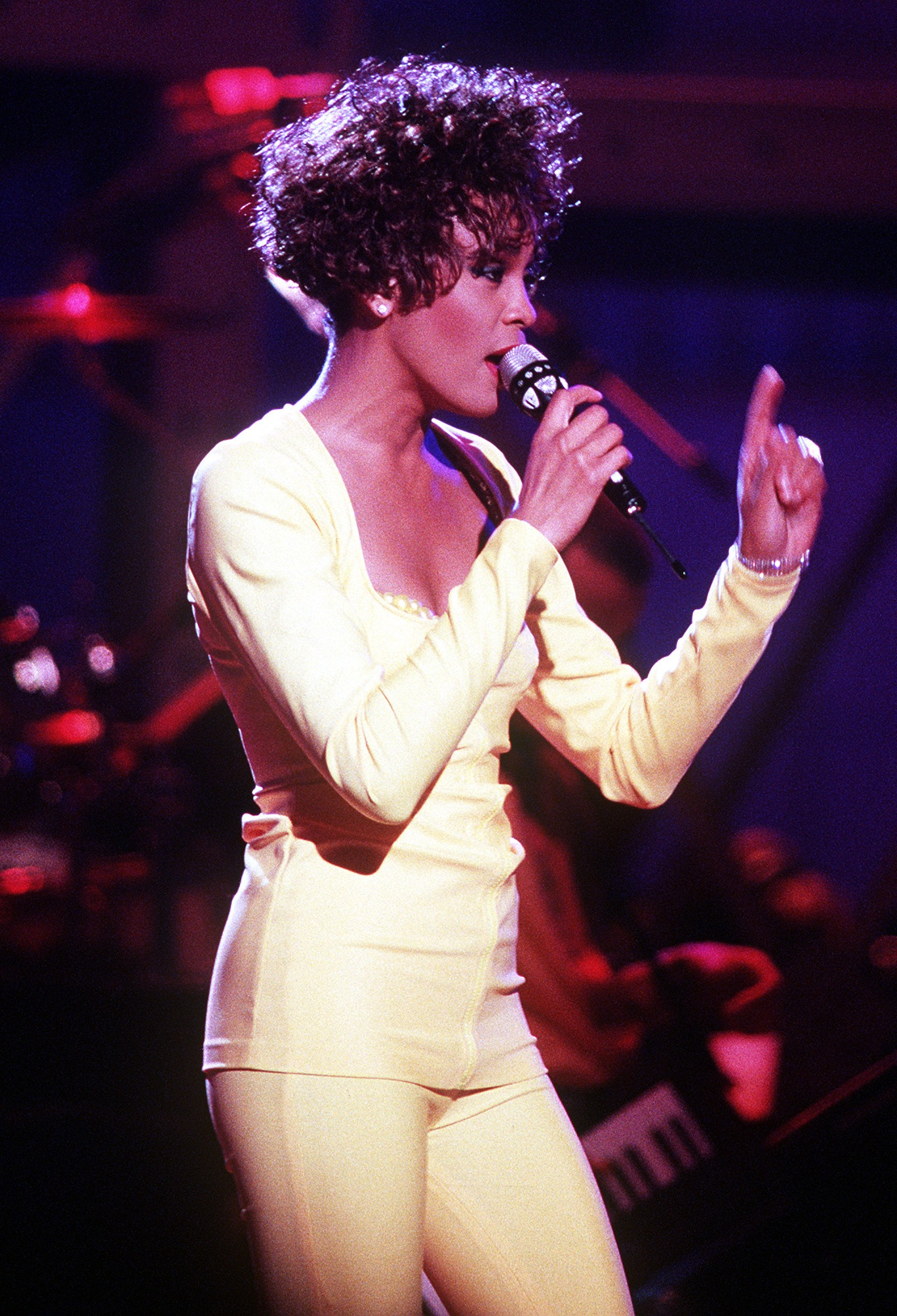
Houston performing the track in 1991

Houston performed "Saving All My Love for You" in a number of places. Houston performed the track for the 28th Annual Grammy Awards and later took home the Best Female Pop Vocal Performance Award for the song. Her performance of the ballad at the Grammys won her an Primetime Emmy Award for Outstanding Individual Performance in a Variety or Music Program at the 38th Primetime Emmy Awards.

Houston also performed the song on Late Night with David Letterman in 1985 and on Wogan in the same year. The Letterman performance was considered one of her best live performances by Digital Spy and VH1. While Liam O'Brien of Digital Spy wrote, "In this assured performance on Late Night With David Letterman, her vocal gymnastics left the host stunned," Mark Graham of VH1 simply picked it as her third best live performance.

She also included the track in all of her concert tours: The Greatest Love World Tour (1986), Moment of Truth World Tour (1987–1988), Feels So Right Tour (1990), I'm Your Baby Tonight World Tour (1991), The Bodyguard World Tour (1993–1994), Pacific Rim Tour (1997), The European Tour (1998), My Love Is Your Love World Tour (1999), Soul Divas Tour (2004) and on her final tour, Nothing but Love World Tour (2009–2010).

"Saving All My Love for You" was also added to the setlist of her first ever solo televised concert and video release Welcome Home Heroes with Whitney Houston (1991) and on her video Whitney: The Concert for a New South Africa (1994). On Japanese TV in 1990 and 1991, Houston's performances of the song from the Yokohama Arena were featured in both concert specials. It was also performed on the 1996 Whitney: Brunei The Royal Wedding Celebration special.

On the 2018 German documentary on Houston, Close Up, a performance of Houston performing the shorter version of the song during a show in Leipzig, Germany was shown.

== Legacy ==
=== Covers and samples ===
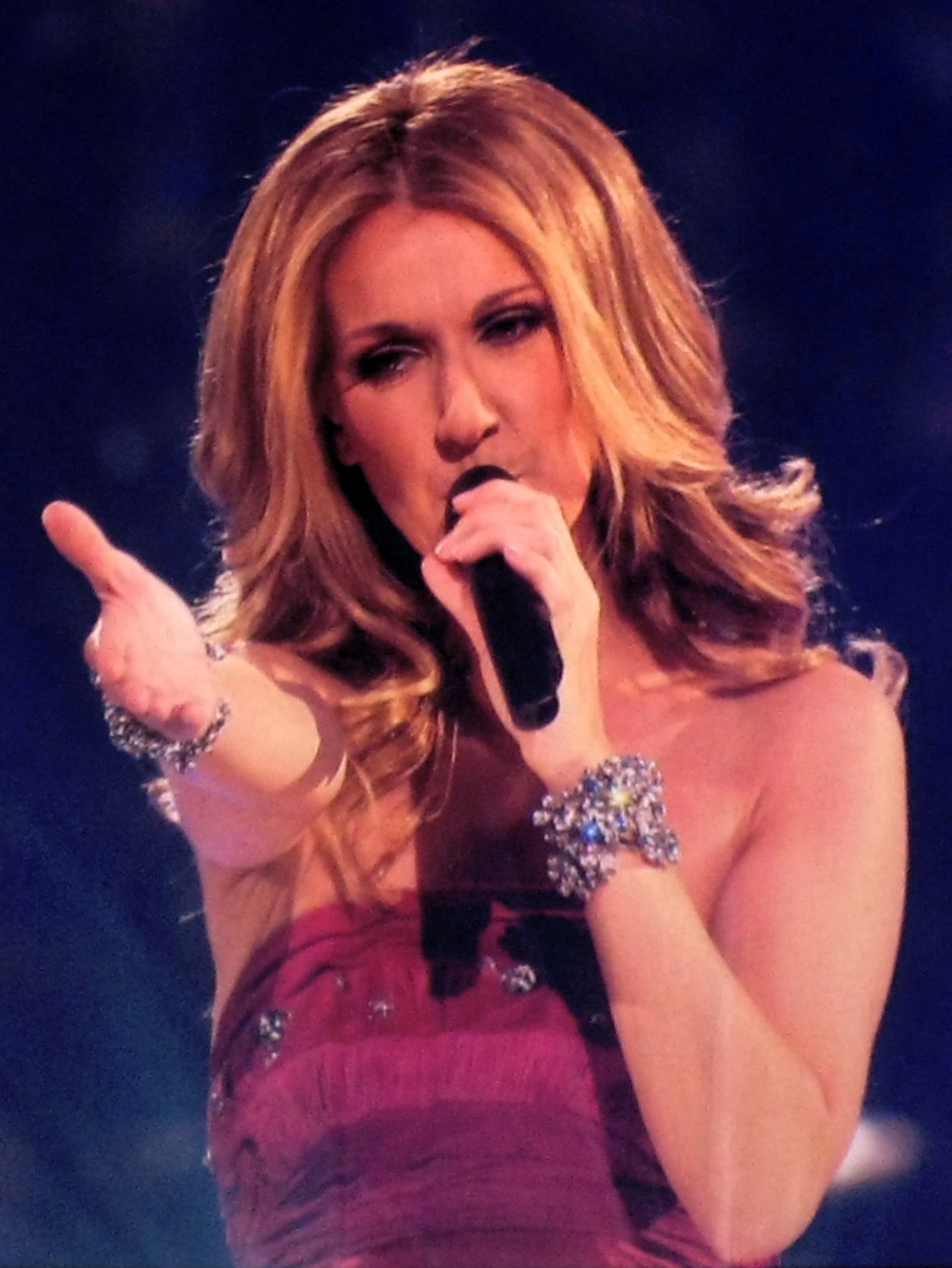
Celine Dion (pictured in 2008) covered the song live early in her career.

Ever since Houston's rendition of the song became a hit in 1985, it has been covered by numerous artists over the years, including foreign-language covers, as well as covered by jazz instrumentalists such as Dave Stahl. A teenage Céline Dion covered the Houston rendition on Canadian television in 1986.

Sevyn Streeter interpolated the ballad for her 2016 single, "My Love for You" on her album Girl Disrupted. In 2020, R&B singer Tamar Braxton sampled the song for her ballad "Crazy Kind of Love" for the soundtrack of the film True to the Game 2: Gena's Story. For the song's accompanying music video, Braxton is seen wearing a headband around her hair and a full piece bodysuit with her initials of her name similar to an outfit Houston wore on the music video to her 1990 hit, "All the Man That I Need".

The song was performed twice in different episodes of the sitcom, Family Matters by Steve Urkel (Jaleel White) and Laura Winslow (Kellie Shanygne Williams). For the 2012 Glee season three tribute episode dedicated to Houston, "Dance with Somebody", the song is performed by Joe Hart (Samuel Larsen) and Quinn Fabray (Dianna Agron).

Other prominent covers come from Will Downing, Dami Im, Helena Vondráčková and Glennis Grace.

=== Awards and accolades ===
"Saving All My Love for You" earned Houston her first Grammy Award for Best Female Pop Vocal Performance in 1986; she also won the American Music Award for Favorite R&B/Soul Video for the song. It has subsequently entered lists of her best songs. While listing her "25 Best Songs", editors from Entertainment Weekly placed the song at number 21, writing that, "The stuff that's been piped into thousands of dentist offices, it was also her first No. 1 hit." Rolling Stone ranked the song the fifth best Whitney Houston song ever among its readers. In their list of 15 essential Whitney Houston songs, The A.V. Club ranked the song second place, writing that the song "established Houston as a unique vocal powerhouse, someone built for capturing the highest highs and lowest lows of emotion." BET placed the song at number 7 on their "40 Best Whitney Houston Songs", writing that, "The song has it all: her breathy come-ons, her trademark epic high notes, her delicate runs." Kelley L. Carter of MTV also listed the track on their "Whitney Houston's Top 10 Songs", complimenting the singer for "taking an already-recorded song and giving it new life." The Guardian ranked the song Houston's eleventh best, writing that despite the song's theme of infidelity, was "notable" for its "lack of raunch", writing, "it's a song about wistful sadness — realism battling with expectation you know it's gonna be deflated."

The New York Daily News ranked "Saving All My Love for You", at number 79 on its "The 100 Greatest Love Songs" list. The song was also ranked by The Telegraph amongst "The 50 Best Love Songs of the 1980s", with the authors writing that, "The song that launched Houston, invented a newly minted variety of globe-storming soul diva", picking the line, "Though I try to resist, being last on your list/But no other man's gonna do/So I'm saving all my love for you," as "killer". In the list of the top-ranked number-one singles of 1985 from worst to best, Matt Mitchell of Paste ranked it number three behind the Tears for Fears hits "Shout" and "Everybody Wants to Rule the World", calling it "fantastic and full of 'other woman' drama. It’s slow, seductive, and sensational. The romance gets cranked to an 11, and Whitney’s superstardom gets elevated even higher." Woman's World ranked the song the thirteenth best love song of the 1980s. Smooth Radio ranked it the eighth greatest love song of the 1980s. Yardbarker listed it in their list of the 35 greatest R&B songs from the 1980s. In December 2016, Cleveland.com placed the ballad on its list of the 80 most important songs of the 1980s, stating that the song was her "A Star is Born moment" and that it "forever raised the bar for future pop divas like Mariah Carey, Celine Dion and Christina Aguilera." Two years later in 2018, the same site ranked the ballad the 23rd greatest love song of the 1980s out of 80 songs.

== Track listings ==
- US 7" vinyl

A: "Saving All My Love for You" – 3:46
B: "All at Once" – 4:26

- UK 12" vinyl

A: "Saving All My Love for You"
B1: "All at Once"
B2: "Greatest Love of All"

- Europe 7" vinyl
1. "Saving All My Love for You" – 3:57
2. "Nobody Loves Me Like You Do" (duet with Jermaine Jackson) – 3:46
- German 7" vinyl

A: "Saving All My Love for You" – 3:57
B: "How Will I Know" – 3:35

== Personnel ==
- Michael Masser – composer, producer
- Gerry Goffin – composer, lyricist
- Whitney Houston – lead vocals, vocal arrangement
- Dan Huff, Louis Shelton, Paul Jackson Jr. – guitar
- Nathan East – bass guitar
- Robbie Buchanan – Fender Rhodes
- Deborah Thomas, Oren Waters, Maxine Waters Willard, Julia Waters Tillman – background vocals
- Tom Scott – saxophone solo
- John Robinson – drums
- Michael Masser – producer
- Gene Page – arranger
- Bill Schnee – mixer
- Michael Mancini, Russell Schmitt – engineers
- Richard Marx – background vocals

== Charts ==
=== Weekly charts ===
Chart (1985–1986)	Peak position
Australia (Kent Music Report)	20
Austria (Ö3 Austria Top 40)	12
Canada Retail Singles (The Record)	15
Canada Top Singles (RPM)	8
Canada Adult Contemporary (RPM)	1
European Hot 100 Singles (Music & Media)	6
Netherlands (Dutch Top 40)	12
Netherlands (Single Top 100)	16
France (SNEP)	11
Germany (GfK)	18
Iceland (RÚV)	8
Ireland (IRMA)	1
Luxembourg (Radio Luxembourg)	1
New Zealand (Recorded Music NZ)	5
Norway (VG-lista)	10
Quebec (ADISQ)	10
Switzerland (Schweizer Hitparade)	5
UK Singles (Official Charts)	1
UK Airplay (Music & Media)	1
US Billboard Hot 100	1
US Hot Black Singles (Billboard)	1
US Adult Contemporary (Billboard)	1
US Top 100 Singles (Cashbox)	5
US Top Black Contemporary Singles (Cashbox)	1
US Radio & Records CHR/Pop Airplay Chart	3

Chart (2012)	Peak position
Australia (ARIA)	90
Netherlands (Dutch Top 40)	62
France (SNEP)	39
Japan Hot 100 (Billboard)	20
South Korea International (Circle)	74
Switzerland (Schweizer Hitparade)	54
UK Singles (Official Charts)	59
US Digital Song Sales (Billboard)	49
US R&B/Hip-Hop Digital Songs (Billboard)	17

=== Year-end charts ===
Chart (1985)	Position
Australia (ARIA)	123
Canada Top Singles (RPM)	72
European Hot 100 Singles (Music & Media)	26
UK Singles (OCC)	17
US Billboard Hot 100	23
US Top Black Singles (Billboard)	5
US Top Adult Contemporary Singles (Billboard)	16

Chart (1986)	Position
European Hot 100 Singles (Music & Media)	30
Switzerland (Schweizer Hitparade)	28

== Certifications ==
Region	Certification	Certified units/sales
New Zealand (RMNZ)	Platinum	30,000^{‡}
United Kingdom (BPI)	Gold	500,000^{^}
United States (RIAA)	2× Platinum	2,000,000^{‡}
^{^} Shipments figures based on certification alone.^{‡} Sales+streaming figures based on certification alone.

== See also ==
- List of number-one singles of 1985 (Ireland)
- List of UK Singles Chart number ones of the 1980s
- List of Billboard Hot 100 number ones of 1985
- List of Hot Adult Contemporary number ones of 1985
- List of number-one R&B singles of 1985 (U.S.)

== Bibliography ==
- Cox, Ted (1999). Whitney Houston: Black Americans of Achievement. Chelsea House Publishers. ISBN 0-7910-4456-4.
- Crawford, Robyn (2019). A Song for You: My Life with Whitney Houston. Dutton. ISBN 978-1-52474-284-3.
