= Eugene Wilde =

American R&B singer (born 1961)

- Born: Ronald Eugene Broomfield; December 6, 1961 (age 64)
- Origin: North Miami Beach, Florida
- Genres: R&B, soul
- Occupations: Singer, songwriter
- Years active: 1979–present
- Labels: 4th & B'way Records (UK), Philly World, Atlantic (US) MCA (US)

Eugene Wilde (born Ronald Eugene Broomfield, December 6, 1961) is an American R&B singer who had two No. 1 hits on the US Billboard R&B charts in the 1980s.

== Career ==
Broomfield was born in North Miami Beach, Florida and raised in Miami. He grew up as part of a family group, La Voyage, playing in local clubs. In the 1970s, the group became Tight Connection, and was later known as Simplicious. Broomfield also recorded an album with Curtom Records in 1979 as a member of Today, Tomorrow, Forever.

On learning Broomfield's middle name was Eugene, his manager insisted that he go by that name professionally; the last name was inspired by Broomfield seeing an advertisement for a New York club named Wildflower's.

In 1984, Eugene Wilde joined Philly World Records, and wrote and recorded his first hit, "Gotta Get You Home Tonight". It rose to No. 1 on the US Hot R&B/Hip-Hop Songs chart, and also made No. 18 on the UK Singles Chart. After a couple of less successful follow-ups, he hit No. 1 again a year later with "Don't Say No Tonight." He also had some lesser hits, including "Diana" (1986). His track "Personality" peaked at No. 34 in the UK. Subsequent releases on the MCA label, solo and with the group Cabo Frio, ("I'll Get Back to You", 1987) were less successful.

In 1985, Wilde appeared in the film Rappin' with Joanna Gardner, where they performed the song, "First Love Never Dies", a duet that also appeared on the film's soundtrack.

In 1987, he recorded a duet with Sheena Easton, "What If We Fall in Love", which appeared on Easton's album, No Sound But a Heart. He later ran the independent label Wilde City Records in Florida.

Starting in the 1990s, Wilde found success behind the scenes as a songwriter, having penned "I'll Never Break Your Heart" with Albert Manno for the Backstreet Boys. He co-wrote album track "Dear Diary" with Jason Blume and Britney Spears for Spears's 2000 album Oops!... I Did It Again. He co-wrote the song "I Wish" with Peter Biker, and Kenneth Karlin and Carsten Schack (who are better known as the Danish production/songwriting duo Soulshock & Karlin) for Victoria Beckham for her 2001 self-titled album - which was planned as Beckham's third single, a duet with Robbie Craig, but the release was canceled. The song was in the film Bend It Like Beckham, whose title referenced Victoria's husband, David Beckham.

In 2010, the Danish production duo of Rob Hardt and Frank Ryle, known as Cool Million, released the title song of their new CD, "Back for More" with Wilde providing the lead vocal, announced with a teaser video via their YouTube account, rylehardtmillion. "Back for More" was written by Wilde with Hardt, Ryle, and his son Du Juan. This same group, along with Felix Luis Collazo II and Diane Williams, co-wrote another track, "Loose", which featured Wilde singing a duet with his sister Dee Dee Wilde which also had a teaser YouTube video.

In 2018, Wilde launched a new record label, 50ish Music Group.

== Discography ==
=== Studio albums ===
Year	Album	Peak chart positions		
Year	Album	US	US R&B	UK
1984	Eugene Wilde	97	14	67
1985	Serenade	—	17	—
1989	I Choose You (Tonight)	—	—	—
1992	How About Tonight	—	—	—
2011	Get Comfortable	—	—	—
"—" denotes releases that did not chart.

=== Compilations ===
- The Best of Eugene Wilde - Got to Get You Home Tonight (1996)
- Eugene Wilde - The Greatest Hits (2004)

=== Singles ===
Year	Single	Peak chart positions			Album
Year	Single	US R&B	US Pop	UK	Album
1984	"Let Her Feel It" (with Simplicious)	―	―	65	Non-album single
1984	"Gotta Get You Home Tonight"	1	83	18	Eugene Wilde
1984	"Rainbow"	22	―	―	Eugene Wilde
1984	"Personality"	―	―	34	Eugene Wilde
1984	"Chey Chey Kulé"	69	―	83	Eugene Wilde
1985	"Don't Say No Tonight"	1	76	80	Serenade
1985	"Diana"	10	―	―	Serenade
1986	"30 Mins. to Talk"	79	―	―	Serenade
1989	"Ain't Nobody's Business"	50	―	―	I Choose You (Tonight)
1989	"I Can't Stop (This Feeling)"	35	―	―	I Choose You (Tonight)
1989	"I Choose You (Tonight)"	56	―	―	I Choose You (Tonight)
1992	"How About Tonight"	17	―	―	How About Tonight
1992	"Special Feelings"	―	―	―	How About Tonight
2010	"Back For More" (Cool Million featuring Eugene Wilde)	―	―	―	
"—" denotes releases that did not chart.

== See also ==
- List of artists who reached number one on the Billboard R&B chart
- List of number-one R&B singles of 1985 (U.S.)
- List of number-one R&B singles of 1986 (U.S.)
