= Gotta Get You Home Tonight =

Single by Eugene Wilde

from the album Eugene Wilde
- Released: September 1984
- Genre: Funk, soul
- Length: 3:58
- Label: Philly World / Atlantic (US); 4th & Broadway (UK)
- Songwriters: Eugene Wilde; McKinley Horton
- Producers: Donald Robinson; Michael Forte

Eugene Wilde singles chronology
"Let Het Feel It" (1984)	"Gotta Get You Home Tonight" (1984)	"Rainbow" (1984)

"Gotta Get You Home Tonight" is a 1984 single written by McKinley Horton & Eugene Wilde (credited under his legal name Ronald Broomfield) and performed by Eugene Wilde. The single was produced by Donald Robinson and Michael Forte.

== Chart performance ==
The song hit number 1 on the U.S. R&B chart for a week in early 1985 and also peaked at number 83 on the Billboard Hot 100. Outside the US, "Gotta Get You Home Tonight" went to number 18 in the UK.

== Samples ==
- Foxy Brown also sampled this track for her song "Get Me Home" featuring Blackstreet on her 1996 debut album Ill Na Na.

== Cover Versions ==
Charlotte Greige (folk singer) recorded a cover of this song on her 2001 album At Llangennith.
