= Don't Say No Tonight =

Single by Eugene Wilde
- B-side: "Gotta Get You Home Tonight"
- Released: October 17, 1985
- Recorded: 1985
- Genre: Soul
- Length: 4:15
- Label: Philly World
- Songwriter: Ronald E Broomfield: James Horton McKinley
- Producer: Donald R. Robinson

Eugene Wilde singles chronology
"Chey Chey Kulé" (1984)	"Don't Say No Tonight" (1985)	"Diana" (1985)

"Don't Say No Tonight" is a 1985 single by Eugene Wilde. The single was his second number one on the R&B chart in the US, where it spent three weeks at the top spot. The single was his most successful on both the R&B and pop charts.

== Chart positions ==
Charts	Peak position
U.S. Billboard Hot 100	76
U.S. Billboard Hot Soul Singles	1
