= Whitney Houston albums discography =

Albums by American singer

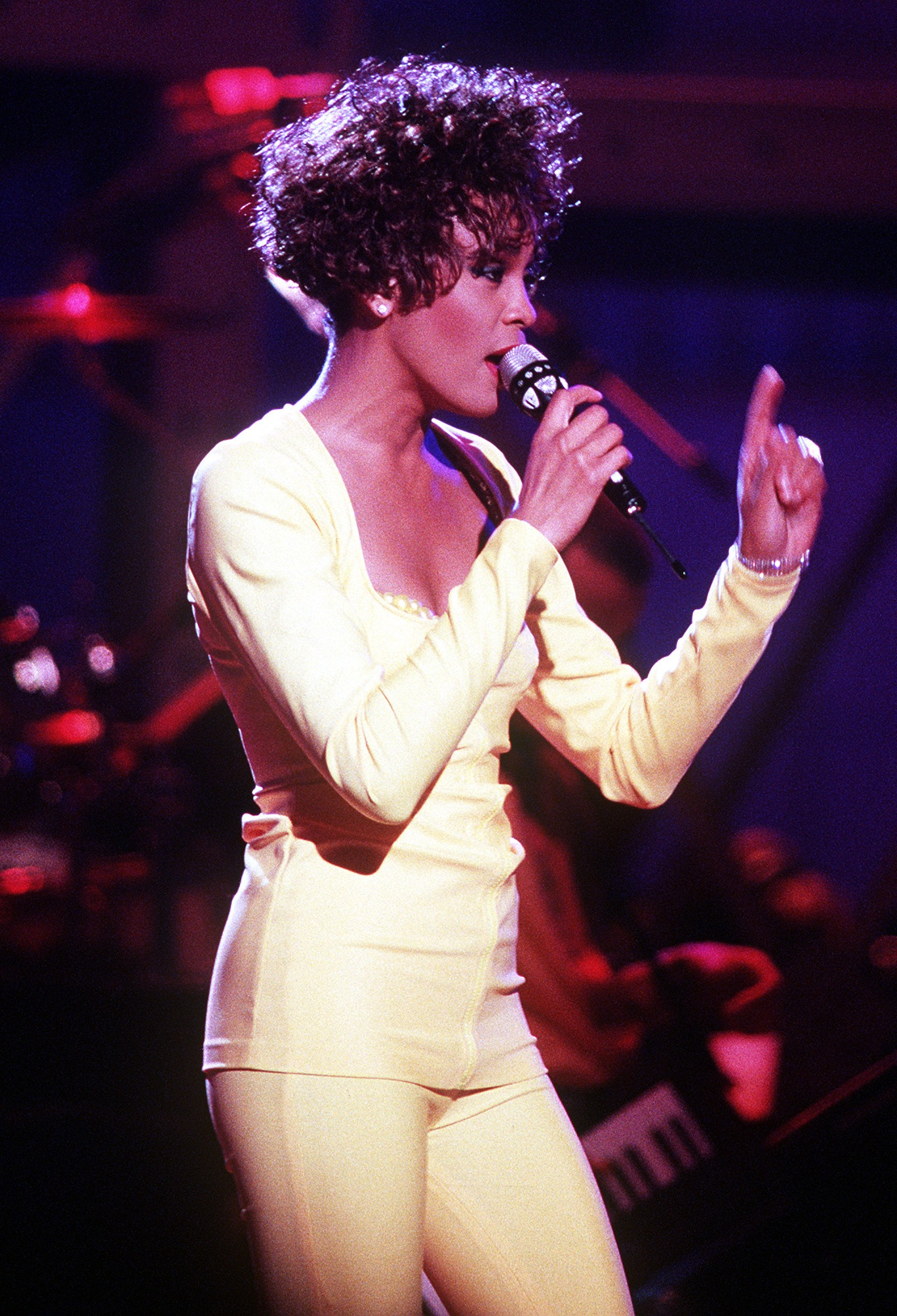
- Houston performing at Welcome Home Heroes with Whitney Houston in 1991
- Studio albums: 7
- Extended plays: 7
- Soundtrack albums: 3
- Live albums: 2
- Compilation albums: 10
- Reissues: 1
- Box sets: 6

American singer Whitney Houston has released seven studio albums, three soundtrack albums, ten compilation albums, six box sets and seven extended plays. Regarded as “The Voice” and a pop culture icon, she is among the best-selling recording artists of all time, with sales of over 220 million records worldwide. She is ranked by the RIAA as the best-selling female R&B artist of the 20th century and fifth highest-certified female artist in the United States, with 62 million album-equivalent units. Houston is the first black recording artist to produce three albums to go diamond by the RIAA.

In 1983, Houston signed a recording contract with Arista Records. The first release under the label was her self-titled debut album, Whitney Houston (1985). A global smash, the album peaked inside the top ten in fourteen countries and topped the charts in seven of them, including the Billboard 200 for a 14-week run a year after its release in 1986, ending the year as the top ranked album on the Billboard 200, the first occurrence for a female artist. It was the first studio album by a woman to be certified ten-times platinum by the RIAA, going on to be certified platinum 14 times. Global sales reached 25 million, making it the best-selling debut album by a solo artist and the best-selling R&B studio release by a female artist, earning Houston her first Guinness World Records. She followed her debut album with Whitney (1987), which became the first album by a woman to debut atop the Billboard 200, staying there for 11 consecutive weeks and reached number one in 14 countries.

Houston entered the 1990s with the release of I'm Your Baby Tonight (1990), which became a global success selling ten million units worldwide, becoming the best-selling R&B album of 1991. Houston released her first soundtrack album, The Bodyguard (1992), for the film of the same name. It topped the charts in every other country it charted, accumulating 20 weeks at number one on the Billboard 200 alone. The soundtrack broke sales records, becoming the first album to sell a million units in a single week and was certified diamond by the RIAA in 1993, marking the first time ever for a female artist, and would later be certified platinum 19 times. Global sales reached 50 million units worldwide, making it the third best-selling album of all time. Houston's second soundtrack, The Preacher's Wife (1996), for the film of the same name, went on to sell 6 million global units, becoming the best-selling gospel album ever. Houston released her fourth studio album, My Love Is Your Love (1998). The album would stay on the Billboard 200 for two years and topped the European Albums Chart. Global units of that album reached 10 million.

Houston entered the 2000s with her first greatest hits compilation album, Whitney: The Greatest Hits (2000), which reached the top ten in various countries and topped the UK Albums Chart and sold over 10 million units worldwide. After renewing her contract with Arista for $100 million, Houston issued her fifth studio album, Just Whitney (2002), following it up with One Wish: The Holiday Album (2003) and I Look to You (2009), the latter of which was her fourth and final number one Billboard 200 album and became a global hit. Following her death in 2012, Houston's The Greatest Hits peaked at number two on the Billboard 200. Since then, her estate has released four albums, including the compilation, I Will Always Love You: The Best of Whitney Houston (2012), which has since become Houston's longest charting album on the Billboard 200. The live album, Whitney Houston Live: Her Greatest Performances (2014), debuted at number one on the Billboard Top R&B Albums chart.

== Albums ==
=== Studio albums ===
Title	Album details	Peak chart positions										Certifications
Title	Album details	US	US R&B	AUS	AUT	CAN	FRA	GER	NLD	SWE	UK	Certifications
Whitney Houston	Released: February 14, 1985; Label: Arista; Formats: CD, cassette, LP	1	1	1	9	1	13	2	5	1	2	US: 14× Platinum (Diamond); AUS: 5× Platinum; AUT: Platinum; CAN: Diamond; FRA: Gold; GER: Platinum; NLD: Platinum; SWE: 2× Platinum; UK: 4× Platinum
Whitney	Released: June 1, 1987; Label: Arista; Formats: CD, cassette, LP	1	2	1	1	1	6	1	1	1	1	US: Diamond; AUS: 3× Platinum; AUT: 2× Platinum; CAN: 7× Platinum; FRA: Platinum; GER: Platinum; NLD: Platinum; SWE: 2× Platinum; UK: 7× Platinum
I'm Your Baby Tonight	Released: November 6, 1990; Label: Arista; Formats: CD, cassette, LP	3	1	10	2	12	9	3	4	3	4	US: 4× Platinum; AUS: Platinum; AUT: Platinum; CAN: Platinum; FRA: Platinum; GER: Platinum; NLD: Platinum; SWE: Platinum; UK: Platinum
My Love Is Your Love	Released: November 17, 1998; Label: Arista; Formats: CD, cassette, LP	13	7	42	1	13	2	2	1	7	4	US: 4× Platinum; AUS: Gold; AUT: Platinum; CAN: 2× Platinum; FRA: 2× Platinum; NLD: Platinum; SWE: 2× Platinum; UK: 3× Platinum
Just Whitney	Released: December 10, 2002; Label: Arista; Formats: CD, CD+DVD, digital download	9	3	114	33	85	25	16	70	―	76	US: Platinum; FRA: Gold
One Wish: The Holiday Album	Released: November 18, 2003; Label: Arista; Formats: CD, digital download	49	14	—	—	— (Note: One Wish: The Holiday Album did not enter the Canadian Albums Chart but peaked at number 29 on the Canadian R&B Albums chart.)	—	—	—	—	―	US: Gold
I Look to You	Released: August 31, 2009; Label: Arista; Formats: CD, CD+DVD, digital download	1	1	16	3	1	3	1	1	2	3	US: Platinum; AUT: Gold; CAN: Platinum; FRA: Gold; GER: Gold; SWE: Gold; UK: Gold
"—" denotes a recording that did not chart or was not released in that territory.

=== Soundtracks ===
Title	Album details	Peak chart positions										Certifications	Sales
Title	Album details	US	US R&B	AUS	AUT	CAN	FRA	GER	NLD	SWE	UK	Certifications	Sales
The Bodyguard: Original Soundtrack Album	Released: November 17, 1992; Label: Arista; Formats: CD, cassette, LP	1	1	1	1	1	1	1	1	1	1	US: 19× Platinum (Diamond); AUS: 5× Platinum; AUT: 4× Platinum; CAN: Diamond; FRA: Diamond; GER: 3× Platinum; NLD: Platinum; SWE: Platinum; UK: 7× Platinum	World: 50,000,000; US: 13,450,000; AUS: 346,000; GER: 1,700,000; SWE: 343,000; UK: 2,255,000
The Preacher's Wife: Original Soundtrack Album	Released: November 27, 1996; Label: Arista; Formats: CD, cassette	3	1	34	8	33	2	9	1	1	35	US: 3× Platinum; AUS: Gold; CAN: Platinum; SWE: Gold; UK: Silver	World: 6,000,000; US: 2,491,000
I Wanna Dance with Somebody (The Movie: Whitney New, Classic and Reimagined)	Released: December 16, 2022; Label: RCA; Formats: Digital download, streaming	—	—	83	—	—	—	—	—	—	— (Note: I Wanna Dance with Somebody (The Movie: Whitney New, Classic and Reimagined) did not enter the UK Albums Chart, but peaked at number 17 on the UK Album Download Chart and number 13 on the UK Soundtrack Albums chart.)		

=== Compilation albums ===
Title	Album details	Peak chart positions										Certifications	Sales
Title	Album details	US	US R&B	AUS	AUT	CAN	FRA	GER	NLD	SWE	UK	Certifications	Sales
Whitney: The Greatest Hits	Released: May 16, 2000; Label: Arista; Formats: CD, cassette	2	3	3	3	4	9	2	2	4	1	US: 5× Platinum; AUS: 2× Platinum; CAN: Platinum; FRA: 2× Gold; GER: Platinum; NLD: Platinum; SWE: Platinum; UK: 5× Platinum	World: 10,000,000; UK: 1,770,000
Love, Whitney	Released: November 20, 2001; Label: Arista; Format: CD	—	―	—	42	—	167	—	24	12	22		
Artist Collection: Whitney Houston	Released: October 4, 2004; Label: Sony BMG Europe / Arista; Formats: CD, CD+DVD	—	—	—	—	—	—	—	—	—	—		
The Ultimate Collection	Released: October 29, 2007; Label: Sony Music / Arista; Formats: CD, CD+DVD, digital download	—	—	3	1	15	52	3	—	10	3	AUS: 2× Platinum; GER: 2× Platinum; SWE: Gold; UK: 6× Platinum	World: 6,000,000
The Essential Whitney Houston	Released: January 10, 2011; Label: Sony Music / Arista; Formats: CD, digital download	―	―	7	26	3	51	20	—	―	7	UK: Silver	
All Time Best - Reclam Musik Edition	Released: August 28, 2011; Label: Arista / Sony; Formats: CD	—	—	—	—	—	—	76	—	—	—		
I Will Always Love You: The Best of Whitney Houston	Released: November 13, 2012; Label: RCA; Formats: CD, vinyl, digital download	14	2	74	―	94	99	―	61	―	13	UK: 2x Platinum; US: Gold	
Japanese Singles Collection -Greatest Hits-	Released: December 21, 2022; Label: Sony Music Japan International; Formats: CD+DVD	—	—	—	—	—	—	—	—	—	—		
I Go to the Rock: The Gospel Music of Whitney Houston	Released: March 24, 2023; Label: Arista / Legacy; Formats: CD, CD+DVD, digital download, streaming	— (Note: I Go to the Rock: The Gospel Music of Whitney Houston did not enter the Billboard 200 chart, but peaked at number 37 on the US Top Album Sales chart.)	—	—	―	—	—	―	—	―	— (Note: I Go to the Rock: The Gospel Music of Whitney Houston did not enter the UK Albums Chart, but peaked at number 71 on the UK Album Download Chart.)		
WH1TNEY	Released: August 7, 2026; Label: Arista / Legacy; Formats: Vinyl, streaming	148	44	—	―	—	—	―	—	―	—		
"—" denotes a recording that did not chart or was not released in that territory.

=== Live albums ===
Title	Album details	Peak chart positions						Certifications
Title	Album details	US	US R&B	AUS	FRA	NLD	UK	Certifications
VH1 Divas 1999	Released: November 2, 1999; Label: Arista; Formats: Cassette, CD	90	78	—	42	41	—	US: Gold
Whitney Houston Live: Her Greatest Performances	Released: November 10, 2014; Label: Sony Music Entertainment; Formats: CD, CD+DVD, CD+DVD 2×LP, digital download	19	2	119	123	63	66	
The Concert for a New South Africa (Durban)	Released: November 8, 2024; Label: Sony Music Entertainment; Formats: CD, 2×LP, digital download	—	—	—	184	—	— (Note: The Concert for a New South Africa (Durban) did not enter the UK Albums Chart, but peaked at number 16 on the UK Album Download Chart.)	

=== Reissues ===
Title	Album details	Peak chart positions	
Title	Album details	US	US R&B
I Wish You Love: More from The Bodyguard	Released: November 17, 2017; Label: Legacy Recordings; Formats: CD, digital download, 2× limited vinyl	165	22

=== Box sets ===
Title	Album details	Note(s)
Whitney: The Unreleased Mixes	Released: April 25, 2000 / June 6, 2006; Label: Arista (#07822-14652-1); Formats: 4× vinyl, digital download	A limited-edition four 12-inch vinyl box set, containing eight full club versions of selected remixes found on the American release of Whitney: The Greatest Hits.; In summer of 2006, it was released digitally, re-titled Dance Vault Mixes: The Unreleased Mixes (Special Collector's Box Set).
Love Whitney	Released: December 4, 2001; Label: BMG Taiwan / Arista (#74321-91027- 2); Format: CD	Taiwanese limited edition box set for the album Love, Whitney, the 16-track CD plus a 40-page color discography/lyric booklet, packaged in a unique 6" × 5" picture box.
The Collection: Whitney Houston	Released: September 29, 2009; Label: Sony Legacy / Arista; Format: 3× CD	Box set including Houston's three studio albums: Whitney Houston, Whitney and My Love Is Your Love.
The Collection	Released: April 19, 2010; Label: Sony Music / Arista; Format: 5× CD	UK only 5-CD album set to coincide with her 2010 UK tour, that comprises five of Houston's UK best selling albums including Whitney Houston, Whitney, I'm Your Baby Tonight, The Bodyguard Soundtrack and My Love Is Your Love.; Each disc is presented in mini-LP style card picture sleeves, housed in a picture box with a lift-off lid.; Later the box set was also released in other European countries and entered the albums charts in the countries in February 2012: Ireland (No. 48), Spain (No. 70), and Sweden (No. 32).
Triple Feature	Released: November 9, 2010; Label: Sony Music Special Products; Format: 3× CD	Box set including three original album releases of I'm Your Baby Tonight, My Love Is Your Love and Just Whitney.; The box set entered the Billboard 200 chart at No. 73, the issue date of March 10, 2012, and peaked at No. 21 on its following week. Also, it debuted at No. 74 on the Billboard R&B/Hip-Hop Album Chart on the week of March 3, 2012, and peaked at No. 5 on its second week.
Two Original Albums: My Love Is Your Love / I Look to You	Released: September 16, 2011; Label: Sony Music; Format: 2× CD	Box set including two original album releases of My Love Is your Love, and I Look to You.; It is the second release of Whitney Houston's albums as part of Sony's "Two Original Albums" series.

== Extended plays ==
Title	EP details	Note(s)
Whitney Dancin' Special	Released: November 1, 1986; Label: Arista (CD: #A28D-1 / LP: #20RS-69); Format: CD, LP	Japan only 6-track mini-album, that includes "How Will I Know" (Dance Remix), "You Give Good Love" (Extended Version), "Thinking About You" (Extended Dance Version), "Someone for Me" (Remix), "Thinking About You" (Dub Version) and "How Will I Know" (Instrumental Version).
Exhale	Released: November 6, 1995; Label: Arista; Formats: CD, LP	A 5 track mini-album, that includes "Exhale (Shoop Shoop)", "Dancin' On the Smooth Edge", "Moment of Truth", "Do You Hear What I Hear?", and "It Isn't, It Wasn't, It Ain't Ever Gonna Be" (Duet With Aretha Franklin). It is also the single release of Exhale (Shoop Shoop).
You Are Loved	Released: January 17, 1999; Label: Arista (#14540-2); Formats: CD	US limited edition 6-track compilation, containing "You Were Loved", "Saving All My Love for You", "I Wanna Dance with Somebody (Who Loves Me)", "Run to You", "All the Man That I Need", and "Why Does It Hurt So Bad", which was available exclusively at Target stores with a big Target logo on the back of the CD.
I Didn't Know My Own Strength: The Remixes	Released: November 6, 2009; Label: RCA/Jive Label Group; Format: Digital download	A 5-track digital remix EP, features two versions by Peter Rauhofer and three of Daddy's Groove Magic Island.
The Remixes	Released: November 6, 2009; Label: RCA/Jive Label Group; Format: Digital download	Includes a total of eight remixes for three songs from the I Look to You album: two remix versions of "Million Dollar Bill", two of "I Didn't Know My Own Strength", and four of "I Look to You".
I Look to You: The Remixes	Released: November 6, 2009; Label: RCA/Jive Label Group; Format: Digital download	A digital EP containing twelve remix versions of "I Look to You", six of them were mixed by Johnny Vicious, three by Christian Dio and Giuseppe D. each.
Million Dollar Bill: The Remixes	Released: November 6, 2009; Label: RCA/Jive Label Group; Format: Digital download	A 6-track digital EP, which features "Million Dollar Bill" remix versions, with three by Freemasons and Frankie Knuckles each.
