= Japanese Singles Collection -Greatest Hits- (Whitney Houston album) =

Greatest hits album by Whitney Houston
- Released: December 21, 2022
- Recorded: 1983–2009
- Genres: Pop; R&B; soul; dance
- Label: Sony Music

Whitney Houston chronology
| I Wanna Dance with Somebody (The Movie: Whitney New, Classic and Reimagined) (2022) | Japanese Singles Collection -Greatest Hits- (2022) | I Go to the Rock: The Gospel Music of Whitney Houston (2023) |

Japanese Singles Collection -Greatest Hits- is the eighth greatest hits album by American singer Whitney Houston. It was released on December 21, 2022, in Japan by Sony Music as part of the Japanese Singles Collection album series. The double-disc album features 35 of Houston's singles released in the continent over the previous 24 years as well as a DVD containing 33 of Houston's music videos.

Its release coincided with the premiere of the Houston biopic, Whitney Houston: I Wanna Dance with Somebody, as well as the 10th anniversary of Houston's passing, the 30th anniversary of the release of The Bodyguard and the 35th anniversary of the release of the Whitney album.

The collection spans Houston's entire career, collecting singles from her debut album, Whitney Houston (1985) to her final album, I Look to You (2009), that were all released in Japan. Houston is one of the best-selling Western artists in the country, with her soundtrack to The Bodyguard, selling 2.8 million copies there.

The accompanying DVD features all of Houston's music videos released during her lifetime from Whitney Houston through I Look to You. The collection also includes the Japanese chart single, "Takin' a Chance", which had been released in 1989, prior to the release of Houston's album, I'm Your Baby Tonight.

== Track listings ==
Disc 1
| No. | Title | Writer(s) | Album | Length |
|---|---|---|---|---|
| 1. | "You Give Good Love" | La La | Whitney Houston, 1985 | 4:10 |
| 2. | "Saving All My Love for You" (The Ultimate Collection edit) | Michael Masser; Gerry Goffin | Whitney Houston | 3:47 |
| 3. | "How Will I Know" | George Merrill; Shannon Rubicam; Narada Michael Walden | Whitney Houston | 4:35 |
| 4. | "Greatest Love of All" | Masser; Linda Creed | Whitney Houston | 4:58 |
| 5. | "All at Once" | Masser; Jeffrey Osborne | Whitney Houston | 4:28 |
| 6. | "I Wanna Dance with Somebody (Who Loves Me)" (Single version) | Merrill; Rubicam | Whitney, 1987 | 4:48 |
| 7. | "Didn't We Almost Have It All" (7" Mix) | Masser; Will Jennings | Whitney | 4:36 |
| 8. | "So Emotional" (Single version) | Tom Kelly; Billy Steinberg | Whitney | 4:03 |
| 9. | "Where Do Broken Hearts Go" | Frank Wildhorn; Chuck Jackson | Whitney | 4:38 |
| 10. | "Love Will Save the Day" (7" Version) | Toni C | Whitney | 4:22 |
| 11. | "One Moment in Time" | Albert Hammond; John Bettis | 1988 Summer Olympics Album: One Moment in Time, 1988 | 4:45 |
| 12. | "Takin' a Chance" | Whitney Houston; BeBe Winans; Keith Thomas | I'm Your Baby Tonight, 1990 | 4:11 |
| 13. | "I'm Your Baby Tonight" | Kenneth "Babyface" Edmonds; Antonio "L.A." Reid | I'm Your Baby Tonight | 5:00 |
| 14. | "All the Man That I Need" | Michael Gore; Dean Pitchford | I'm Your Baby Tonight | 3:56 |
| 15. | "Miracle" | Edmonds; Reid | I'm Your Baby Tonight | 5:43 |
| 16. | "My Name Is Not Susan" | Eric Foster White | I'm Your Baby Tonight | 4:39 |
| 17. | "I Belong to You" | Franne Golde; Derek Bramble | I'm Your Baby Tonight | 4:42 |

Disc 2
| No. | Title | Writer(s) | Album | Length |
|---|---|---|---|---|
| 1. | "I Will Always Love You" (Ultimate Collection edit) | Dolly Parton | The Bodyguard, 1992 | 4:33 |
| 2. | "I'm Every Woman" (7" Single) | Nicholas Ashford; Valerie Simpson | The Bodyguard | 4:46 |
| 3. | "I Have Nothing" | David Foster; Linda Thompson | The Bodyguard | 4:49 |
| 4. | "Run to You" | Jud Friedman; Allan Rich | The Bodyguard | 4:26 |
| 5. | "Queen of the Night" (CJ's Single Edit) | Houston; Edmonds; Reid; Daryl Simmons | The Bodyguard | 3:23 |
| 6. | "Exhale (Shoop Shoop)" | Edmonds | Waiting to Exhale, 1995 | 3:23 |
| 7. | "Why Does It Hurt So Bad" | Edmonds | Waiting to Exhale | 4:39 |
| 8. | "I Believe in You and Me" | Sandy Linzer; David Wolfert | The Preacher's Wife, 1996 | 3:54 |
| 9. | "Step by Step" | Annie Lennox | The Preacher's Wife | 4:13 |
| 10. | "Heartbreak Hotel" (duet with Faith Evans and Kelly Price) | Carsten Schack; Kenneth Karlin; Tamara Savage | My Love Is Your Love, 1998 | 4:06 |
| 11. | "My Love Is Your Love" | Wyclef Jean; Jerry Duplessis | My Love Is Your Love | 4:19 |
| 12. | "If I Told You That" (duet with George Michael) | Rodney Jerkins; Fred Jerkins III; LaShawn Daniels; Toni Estes | Whitney: The Greatest Hits, 2000 | 4:06 |
| 13. | "Fine" | Houston; Kamaal Fareed; Raphael Saadiq | Whitney: The Greatest Hits, 2000 | 3:37 |
| 14. | "Try It on My Own" | B. Edmonds; Jason Edmonds; Carole Bayer Sager; Aleese Simmons; Nathan Walton | Just Whitney, 2002 | 4:31 |
| 15. | "I Look to You" | R. Kelly | I Look to You, 2009 | 4:27 |
| 16. | "I Didn't Know My Own Strength" | Diane Warren | I Look to You | 3:44 |
| 17. | "How Will I Know - Dance Remix" | Merrill; Rubicam; Walden | Whitney Dancin' Special, 1986 | 6:32 |
| 18. | "Do You Hear What I Hear" | Gloria Shayne Baker; Noël Regney | A Very Special Christmas, 1987 | 3:31 |

DVD
| No. | Title | Album | Length |
|---|---|---|---|
| 1. | "You Give Good Love" | Whitney Houston | 4:04 |
| 2. | "Saving All My Love for You" | Whitney Houston | 3:59 |
| 3. | "How Will I Know" | Whitney Houston | 4:36 |
| 4. | "Greatest Love of All" | Whitney Houston | 4:53 |
| 5. | "I Wanna Dance with Somebody (Who Loves Me)" | Whitney | 5:16 |
| 6. | "Didn't We Almost Have It All" | Whitney | 6:51 |
| 7. | "So Emotional" | Whitney | 4:07 |
| 8. | "Where Do Broken Hearts Go" | Whitney | 4:39 |
| 9. | "One Moment in Time" | 1988 Summer Olympics Album: One Moment in Time | 5:28 |
| 10. | "I'm Your Baby Tonight" | I'm Your Baby Tonight | 4:25 |
| 11. | "All the Man That I Need" | I'm Your Baby Tonight | 4:04 |
| 12. | "Miracle" | I'm Your Baby Tonight | 5:06 |
| 13. | "My Name Is Not Susan" | I'm Your Baby Tonight | 4:17 |
| 14. | "I Belong to You" | I'm Your Baby Tonight | 4:42 |
| 15. | "I Will Always Love You" | The Bodyguard | 4:34 |
| 16. | "I'm Every Woman" | The Bodyguard | 4:48 |
| 17. | "I Have Nothing" | The Bodyguard | 4:49 |
| 18. | "Run to You" | The Bodyguard | 4:20 |
| 19. | "Queen of the Night" | The Bodyguard | 3:05 |
| 20. | "I Believe in You and Me" | The Preacher's Wife | 4:07 |
| 21. | "Step by Step" | The Preacher's Wife | 4:13 |
| 22. | "When You Believe" (duet with Mariah Carey) | My Love Is Your Love | 4:59 |
| 23. | "Heartbreak Hotel" (duet with Faith Evans and Kelly Price) | My Love Is Your Love | 4:07 |
| 24. | "It's Not Right but It's Okay" | My Love Is Your Love | 4:24 |
| 25. | "My Love Is Your Love" | My Love Is Your Love | 4:19 |
| 26. | "I Learned From the Best" | My Love Is Your Love | 4:25 |
| 27. | "If I Told You That" (duet with George Michael) | Whitney: The Greatest Hits | 4:05 |
| 28. | "Fine" | Whitney: The Greatest Hits | 3:37 |
| 29. | "One of Those Days" | Just Whitney | 3:53 |
| 30. | "Try It on My Own" | Just Whitney | 4:36 |
| 31. | "One Wish (For Christmas)" | One Wish: The Holiday Album | 4:14 |
| 32. | "I Look to You" | I Look to You | 4:27 |
| 33. | "Million Dollar Bill" | I Look to You | 4:07 |

== Charts ==
Chart performance for Japanese Singles Collection -Greatest Hits-
| Chart (2022–2023) | Peak position |
|---|---|
| Japanese Albums (Oricon) | 44 |
| Japan Hot Albums (Billboard Japan) | 42 |
