= US Tour =

1985 concert tour by Whitney Houston

- National tour by Whitney Houston
- Location: North America
- Associated album: Whitney Houston
- Start date: June 27, 1985
- End date: December 1, 1985
- Legs: 1
- No. of shows: 59

Whitney Houston concert chronology
- US Tour (1985); The Greatest Love World Tour (1986)

The US Tour was the debut promotional tour of American singer Whitney Houston, designed to promote her debut album Whitney Houston, released on February 14, 1985. The tour took place in multiple theaters, festivals, and clubs around the United States throughout the summer and fall between June 27 and December 1, 1985. Initially, the opening act for established singer Jeffrey Osborne and following selected spots on Luther Vandross' tour that year, Houston eventually headlined her own shows, including two landmark performances at Carnegie Hall in New York.

== Background ==
Houston released her self-titled debut album in February 1985 and first began promoting the album through performing at nightclubs all across the country, starting at one of her old haunts, Manhattan's Sweetwater's jazz club, one of many venues her mother Cissy regularly performed at and at which Houston was discovered by her label head and mentor Clive Davis, who signed her to his label Arista roughly two years prior.

After Sweetwater's, Houston performed at other nightclubs, including Los Angeles' Roxy Theatre in May while also promoting her album on national TV shows in both her native United States and in Europe. That month, her first leading single, "You Give Good Love", peaked at number one on the Hot Black Singles chart. Not too long afterwards, it was announced that Houston would open for American singer Jeffrey Osborne on his national US tour at the end of June. Houston had recorded Osborne's composition, "All at Once", on her debut. Not too long after joining Osborne's tour, Houston started getting rave reviews for her performances.

Around August, just as her second single, "Saving All My Love for You", was being promoted by her label, Houston joined longtime friend Luther Vandross' The Night I Fell In Love Tour on a few selected dates. By the end of August, as her debut album hit the top ten of the Billboard 200, it was decided by Houston's management, which was led by Gene Harvey, that Houston would begin headlining her own shows since her fame was starting to outgrow that of Osborne and Vandross.

Houston's first headlining show was at Humphrey's in San Diego for two shows on August 28. On October 28, two days after "Saving All My Love for You" topped the Billboard Hot 100, Houston gave the first of two sold-out shows at Carnegie Hall before heading back to London where she filmed the music video for "How Will I Know" in early November before returning to the States where she eventually finished her tour at the Universal Amphitheater in California on December 1.

== Set list ==
1. "Greatest Love of All"
2. "Love Will Find a Way"
3. "How Will I Know"
4. "Saving All My Love for You"
5. "Someone for Me"
6. "Hold Me"
7. "Take Good Care of My Heart"
8. "Nobody Loves Me Like You Do"
9. "Send It"
10. "All at Once"
11. "Thinking About You"
12. "I Am Changing"
13. "Tomorrow"
14. "You Give Good Love"

Notes

- August 28: in San Diego, Houston's opening act was comedian Roseanne Barr.
- October 26: Houston performed at Disney World's 'On Stage' event at the Skyleidsocope, on October 28: at Carnegie Hall, she performed a showstopping rendition of "I Am Changing" from the Broadway musical Dreamgirls.
- November 20: at Carnegie Hall, Houston performed "I Am Changing", and her mother Cissy Houston mounted the stage to sing a cover of the classic "You Are My Dream".

== Shows ==
List of 1985 concerts
Date	City	Country	Venue
June 27, 1985	New York City	United States	Pier 84
June 29, 1985	Columbia	United States	Merriweather Post Pavilion
June 30, 1985	Pittsburgh	United States	Syria Mosque Theater
July 1, 1985	New York City	United States	Pier 84
July 2, 1985	Boston	United States	Boston Common
July 12, 1985	Highland Heights	United States	Front Row Theater
July 13, 1985	Highland Heights	United States	Front Row Theater
July 14, 1985	Highland Heights	United States	Front Row Theater
July 15, 1985	Highland Heights	United States	Front Row Theater
July 24, 1985	Milwaukee	United States	Riverside Theater
July 25, 1985	Hoffman Estates	United States	Poplar Creek Music Theater
July 26, 1985	St. Louis	United States	Fox Theatre
July 30, 1985	Devon	United States	Valley Forge Music Fair
July 31, 1985	Devon	United States	Valley Forge Music Fair
August 1, 1985	Devon	United States	Valley Forge Music Fair
August 2, 1985	Westbury	United States	Theatre at Westbury
August 3, 1985	Westbury	United States	Theatre at Westbury
August 8, 1985	Des Moines	United States	Veterans Memorial Auditorium
August 9, 1985	Merrillville	United States	Holiday Star Theatre
August 10, 1985	Merrillville	United States	Holiday Star Theatre
August 11, 1985	Clarkston	United States	Pine Knob Music Theatre
August 16, 1985	Houston	United States	The Summit
August 17, 1985	Dallas	United States	Reunion Arena
August 18, 1985	Oklahoma City	United States	Myriad Convention Center
August 19, 1985	Dallas	United States	Reunion Arena
August 22, 1985	New Orleans	United States	UNO Lakefront Arena
August 24, 1985	Jackson	United States	Mississippi Coliseum
August 25, 1985	Memphis	United States	Mid-South Coliseum
August 28, 1985	San Diego	United States	Humphrey's Concerts by the Bay
August 29, 1985	Concord	United States	Concord Pavilion
August 30, 1985	Los Angeles	United States	Greek Theatre
August 31, 1985	Los Angeles	United States	Greek Theatre
September 1, 1985	Costa Mesa	United States	Pacific Amphitheatre
September 20, 1985	Highland Heights	United States	Front Row Theater
September 21, 1985	Austell	United States	Six Flags Over Georgia
September 22, 1985	Williamsburg	United States	Busch Gardens Theater
September 27, 1985	Washington, D.C.	United States	DAR Constitution Hall
September 28, 1985	Hartford	United States	Bushnell Memorial Hall
September 29, 1985	Boston	United States	Berklee Performance Center
October 2, 1985	Chicago	United States	Park West
October 4, 1985	Sterling Heights	United States	Premier Center
October 5, 1985	Sterling Heights	United States	Premier Center
October 6, 1985	Grand Rapids	United States	DeVos Hall
October 11, 1985	Baltimore	United States	Lyric Opera House
October 12, 1985	Baton Rouge	United States	Riverside Centroplex
October 13, 1985	San Marcos	United States	Strahan Arena
October 18, 1985	St. Louis	United States	Fox Theatre
October 19, 1985	Indianapolis	United States	Clowes Memorial Hall
October 20, 1985	Richmond	United States	The Mosque
October 26, 1985	Lake Buena Vista	United States	Epcot Skyleidoscope
October 28, 1985	New York City	United States	Carnegie Hall
November 15, 1985	Upper Darby	United States	Tower Theater
November 17, 1985	New Haven	United States	Woolsey Hall
November 20, 1985	New York City	United States	Carnegie Hall
November 23, 1985	Dallas	United States	Dallas Convention Center Arena
November 24, 1985	Houston	United States	Houston Music Hall
November 29, 1985	Phoenix	United States	Celebrity Theatre
November 30, 1985	San Diego	United States	Golden Hall
December 1, 1985	Los Angeles	United States	Universal Amphitheatre

== Personnel ==
Band

- Music director / piano – John Simmons
- Keyboards – Willard Meeks
- Saxophone – Josh Harris
- Guitar – Curtis Taylor Neishloss
- Bass - Rickey Minor
- Drums – Brian Brake
- Percussion – Kevin Jones
- Background vocalists – Gary Houston, Felicia Moss, Voneva Simms
