= Whitney Dancin' Special =

Remix album by Whitney Houston
- Released: November 1, 1986
- Length: 39:02
- Label: Arista
- Producer: Jellybean; Narada Michael Walden; Bruce Forest

Whitney Houston chronology
Whitney Houston (1985)	Whitney Dancin' Special (1986)	Whitney (1987)

Whitney Dancin' Special is the first remix album by American singer Whitney Houston and was released exclusively in Japan on November 1, 1986, by Arista Records. It was manufactured and distributed by Nippon Phonogram during its original release, and by BMG Victor during its re-issue. It includes five remixed and one instrumental version of songs from her self-titled debut album.

It was later released in the US for the first time as part of Houston's 35th anniversary edition of her debut album. The box set included an alternate version of "You Give Good Love (Extended Dance Version)" with previously unreleased vocalizations. The version was later added as a seventh track to the digital version of the remix album.

== Track listing ==
Whitney Dancin' Special – Standard edition
No.	Title	Writer(s)	Remixer	Length
1.	"How Will I Know" (Dance Remix)	George Merrill; Narada Michael Walden; Shannon Rubicam	Jellybean	6:34
2.	"You Give Good Love" (Extended Dance Version)	LaLa		4:50
3.	"Thinking About You" (Dance Version)	Kashif; LaLa	Bruce Forest	7:18
4.	"Someone for Me" (Remix)	Raymond Jones; Freddie Washington	Alan "The Judge" Coulthard	7:24
5.	"Thinking About You" (Dub Version)	Kashif; LaLa	Bruce Forest	8:09
6.	"How Will I Know" (Instrumental Version)	Merrill; Walden; Rubicam		4:42

2020 digital edition – bonus track
No.	Title	Writer(s)	Length
7.	"You Give Good Love" (Extended Alternate Dance Version)	LaLa	4:49

== Charts ==
Chart performance
Chart (1986)	Peak position
Japanese Albums (Oricon)	19

== Sales ==
The album sold 19,480 units in Japan.
