= All at Once (Whitney Houston song) =

1985 song by Whitney Houston

- One of 7-inch releases, manufactured in Germany

Single by Whitney Houston

from the album Whitney Houston
- B-side: "Thinking About You"; "Someone for Me"
- Released: March 1985
- Recorded: 1984, Los Angeles
- Genre: Pop; soul; R&B
- Length: 4:29
- Label: Arista
- Composer: Michael Masser
- Lyricist: Jeffrey Osborne
- Producer: Michael Masser

Whitney Houston singles chronology
"You Give Good Love" (1985)	"All at Once" (1985)	"Saving All My Love for You" (1985)

Licensed audio
- "All at Once" on YouTube

"All at Once" is a song by American singer Whitney Houston from her self-titled debut album. The song was written by Michael Masser and Jeffrey Osborne and produced by Masser.

It is a ballad about a love who leaves without warning and the heartbreak that is felt afterwards.

"All at Once" was released in March 1985 by Arista Records as a single in several European countries, as well as in Japan in 1985–1986.

In North America it was not released as a single but did receive steady radio airplay on pop and R&B stations there throughout late 1986 and early 1987, leading to a delay in the release of Houston's sophomore album.

The song became Houston's first significant hit in several European countries, including Belgium and the Netherlands, and also became her debuting hit in South Africa.

Following her 1987 performance of the song at the Sanremo Music Festival in Italy, Houston made history there as the first artist to give an encore performance of the same song at the festival.

The performance resulted in Houston having a top five hit of the ballad in Italy. It also became one of Houston's biggest hits in Japan, where it went gold.

Houston also gave a performance of the song at the 14th Annual American Music Awards, the same night Houston won five awards for her debut.

The song was performed in full during her US Tour as well as the international legs of her Greatest Love World Tour. After excluding the song during her Moment of Truth World Tour, Houston re-added the ballad at the beginning of her "Love Medley" performance of her concerts, starting with the Feels So Good Japanese tour in 1990 and subsequently included the song for most of her later tours.

"All at Once" was featured on four Houston compilation albums -- Whitney: The Greatest Hits, Love, Whitney, the Japanese edition of I Will Always Love You: The Best of Whitney Houston and Japanese Singles Collection -Greatest Hits-.

== Background and recording ==
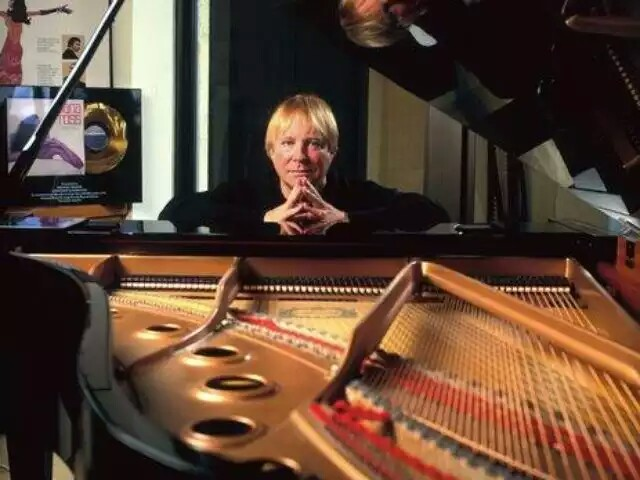
American record producer Michael Masser was the producer and co-composer of All at Once.

In April 1983, 19-year-old Whitney Houston signed with Arista Records. For several months, Houston and Arista CEO Clive Davis hosted showcases in New York and Los Angeles seeking producers to work on Houston's debut album.

The showcases, while well received, failed to get the attention of producers who either couldn't commit due to previous engagements or wasn't sure on how to produce Houston.

In June 1983, Houston made her national television debut on The Merv Griffin Show and finally got attention from producers such as Kashif and Jermaine Jackson, who agreed to work with Houston.

Around the same time, Davis contacted Michael Masser from Los Angeles to come to a New York show Houston was co-headlining with her mother Cissy, telling Masser that Houston was constantly covering his hit 1977 composition, "The Greatest Love of All".

Masser agreed and upon walking in, caught Houston singing the opening line of the song. By the end of the performance, Masser was moved and agreed to work with Houston on her album under the condition he was allowed to make her the featured duet artist for Teddy Pendergrass with the ballad, "Hold Me", which Davis allowed.

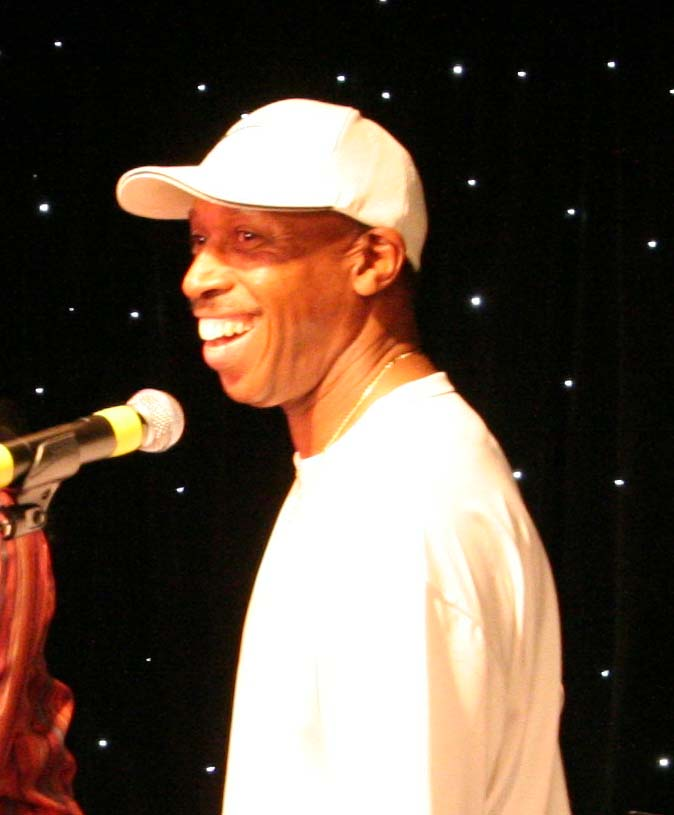
Singer Jeffrey Osborne was the lyricist of All at Once.

Following the recording of "Hold Me", Masser sent Houston three solo songs, including "All at Once", to record in 1984.

"All at Once" initially was set to be recorded by fellow singer Jeffrey Osborne, who co-wrote the song with Masser for his next album, Emotional, but Osborne felt the album had too many ballads and decided not to put it on the album.

Later on, Masser called Osborne and told him he was sending the ballad to the then-relatively unknown Houston for her album and asked if he could send it to her, to which Osborne agreed.

Houston recorded the ballad in Los Angeles. Though Clive Davis felt there were too many ballads recorded for the album, he allowed the song to be on the final track listing of Houston's debut. Of the ten songs on the album, six of them, including "All at Once", were ballads.

=== Composition ===
"All at Once" is a pop song with R&B and soul elements that mostly plays at the key of B♭ major with a shift to C♯ during the chorus. In the final chorus leading to its climax, it shifts again to D major.

The song has a "slow and expressively" tempo and a metronome of 66 beats. Houston's vocal range in the song ranges from B♭_{3} to E♭_{5}.

The song includes a synthesizer keyboard intro, soft strings, bass guitar and drums. It has a noticeable key change at the end of the song and includes Houston holding a long note. The song is about a love who leaves for another lover without warning and the heartbreak that is felt afterwards.

== Chart performance ==
Following the North American release of "You Give Good Love" in March 1985, Arista decided to issue "All at Once" in Europe.

Following promotion of the ballad in the Netherlands, the song reached number five in both the Dutch Top 40 and Single Top 100 and was Houston's debut hit there.

The song also received heavy promotion in Belgium where it peaked at number two there, also becoming Houston's first hit in that country.

Later on that year, it was released as a single in South Africa where it reached the 24th position.

Following her performance at the Sanremo Music Festival in February 1987, the song was released as a single in Italy where it also peaked inside the top 5 there.

Later, it was released as a single in Japan where it peaked at number 42 on its official Oricon Singles chart and is later certified gold in the country for sales of 50,000 copies.

It also peaked at number 23 in the United States on the Radio & Records Adult Contemporary chart for its August 8th, 1986, issue.

== Music videos ==
Arista released a promotional music video exclusive to Germany and Japan. Another video was released for some European countries; it features Houston singing the song onstage.

== Live performances ==
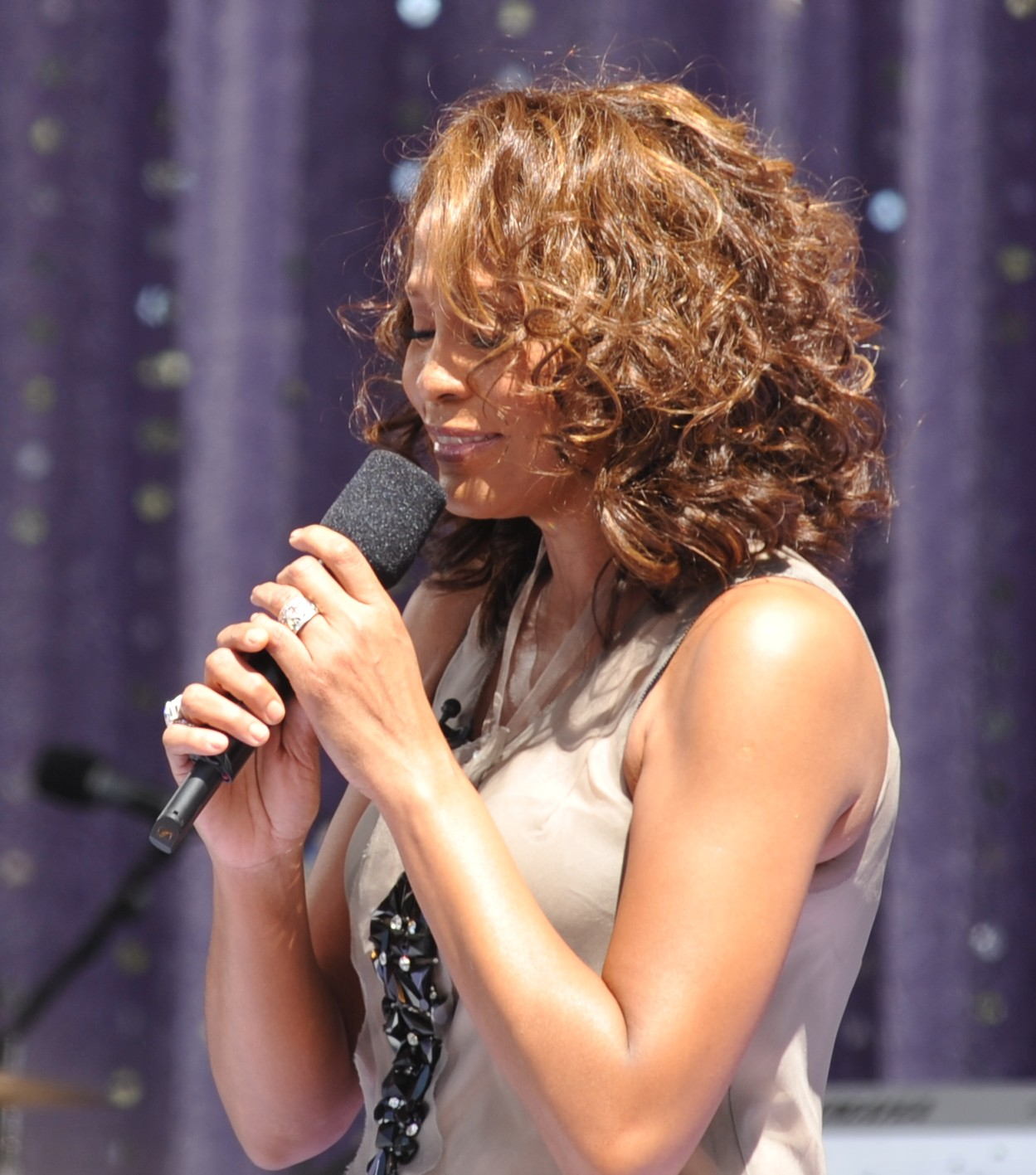
Whitney Houston (pictured in 2009) performed All at Once live for the majority of her career.

Houston gave several televised performances of the song on various programs, first doing so on Dutch TV's PopsJops show followed by German TV's Peter's Popshow in 1985, the Japanese TV show Night's Hit Studio and on the UK TV show Wogan in 1986.

The following year, Houston performed the song at the 1987 American Music Awards as well as Italy's Sanremo Music Festival. In the latter competition, an encore of the song was requested, the first time that occurred in the festival's history; in both performances, Houston received a standing ovation. In February 1999, twelve years after her landmark Sanremo performance, Houston returned to Italian television on the show C'era Un Ragazzo singing the ballad with famed Italian pop singer Gianni Morandi, who had participated in the same festival the year Houston appeared.

Houston also performed the song live at the Yokohama Arena in January 1990 for Japanese TV. A year later in March 1991, during another Yokohama Arena concert, it also broadcast on Japanese TV. Later that same month, she performed the song at her critically acclaimed Welcome Home Heroes with Whitney Houston HBO-TV special. During all of her broadcast South American concerts in 1994 as well as the Whitney: The Concert for a New South Africa special at Johannesburg's Ellis Park Stadium, the song was performed as well as in the Whitney: Brunei The Royal Wedding Celebration special in 1996.

Houston included the song in four of her world concert tours : The Greatest Love World Tour, the I'm Your Baby Tonight World Tour, the Bodyguard World Tour and the Nothing but Love World Tour, as well as all of her five territorial concert tours: the US Tour (1985), the Feels So Right tour in Japan (1990), the Pacific Rim Tour (1997), the European Tour (1998) and the Soul Divas Tour (2004).

Houston also performed the song in Japan and Europe during her Greatest Love World Tour in 1986. Houston would include the song in the "Love Medley" portions of her concert tours, including the I'm Your Baby Tonight World Tour, The Bodyguard World Tour and the Nothing but Love World Tour.

Houston performed the song in full during her concert stops in Europe and Japan during the Greatest Love World Tour. For the remainder of the tours where she performed the song, the ballad was performed as part of the "Love Medley" portion of her concerts and was often the first song to be performed in the medley.

== Covers ==
According to WhoSampled, the ballad was covered 37 times, making it one of Houston's most covered songs of her catalog. Ironically, one of the most prominent covers of the song came from the song's original lyricist Jeffrey Osborne.

== Legacy and accolades ==
In their list of forty best Whitney Houston songs, BET ranked it 21st place, citing the ballad as among her first "massive, pop-diva ballads, paving roads for Mariah, Celine and others to drive down."

In 2024, Entertainment Weekly ranked the song number 22 in its list of 25 best Whitney Houston songs. That same year, Smooth Radio ranked the song eleventh place among the singer's fifteen greatest songs, calling it "one of [Houston's] signature ballads".

== Formats and track listings ==
- Europe 12" vinyl maxi single

A1: "All at Once" – 4:26
B1: "Thinking About You" – 4:53
B2: "Someone for Me" – 7:23

- Jamaica 7" vinyl maxi single

A1: "All at Once" – 4:28
B1: "Greatest Love of All" – 4:55

- Italy 7" vinyl, promo

A: "All at Once" – 4:26
B: "Hold Me" (duet with Teddy Pendergrass) – 6:00

- Japan 7" vinyl single

A: "All at Once" – 5:56
B: "Greatest Love of All" – 6:16

- Germany 7" vinyl single
1. "All at Once" – 4:06
2. "Thinking About You" – 4:44
- South Africa 7" vinyl single
1. "All at Once"
2. "Thinking About You"

== Charts ==
=== Weekly charts ===
Chart (1985–1987)	Peak position
Belgium (Ultratop 50 Flanders)	2
Belgium (VRT Top 30)	5
Italy (FIMI)	5
Italy Airplay (Music & Media)	5
Netherlands (Dutch Top 40)	5
Netherlands (Single Top 100)	6
South Africa (Springbok Radio)	24

Chart (1996)	Peak position
Japan (Oricon)	42

Chart (2012)	Peak position
France (SNEP)	132
Japan Hot 100 (Billboard)	24
South Korea International (Gaon)	115
US R&B/Hip-Hop Digital Songs (Billboard)	42

=== Year-end charts ===
Chart (1985)	Position
Belgium (Ultratop 50 Flanders)	24
Netherlands (Dutch Top 40)	35
Netherlands (Single Top 100)	48

== Certifications ==
Region	Certification	Certified units/sales
Japan (RIAJ) 1996 release	Gold	50,000^{^}
^{^} Shipments figures based on certification alone.
