= Love, Whitney =

Compilation album by Whitney Houston
- Released: November 20, 2001
- Length: 73:28
- Labels: Arista; BMG Entertainment

Whitney Houston chronology
Whitney: The Greatest Hits (2000)	Love, Whitney (2001)	Just Whitney (2002)

Love, Whitney is a compilation of ballads by Whitney Houston, released in 2001. It was the follow-up to Houston's multi-platinum greatest hits collection Whitney: The Greatest Hits (2000). Unlike a traditional greatest-hits album, this release focuses specifically on Houston's love songs, drawing material from her studio albums recorded between 1985 and 1998. The collection features sixteen tracks, including several of her best-known romantic ballads alongside a few lesser-known selections such as "Why Does It Hurt So Bad", "Miracle", and "For the Love of You".

The album was issued by Arista Records during a period of renewed commercial focus on Houston's back catalogue, following her signing of a long-term contract with the label. It was marketed primarily to casual listeners and international audiences, particularly in the United Kingdom, where it served as a complementary release to her earlier compilation. The collection highlights Houston's signature vocal style and her dominance of the adult contemporary and pop charts throughout the late 1980s and 1990s. The album includes ten U.S. top 10 hits.

== Critical reception ==
Professional ratings
Review scores
Source	Rating
AllMusic	3/5 stars
Canoë France	2.5/5 stars
Rolling Stone	2/5 stars

In his review for AllMusic, Jose F. Promis described Love, Whitney as a pleasant but ultimately redundant compilation. He noted that the album is not a greatest-hits collection, but rather a selection of Whitney Houston's sweeping love songs drawn from her previous releases. While praising the inclusion of overlooked tracks such as "Why Does It Hurt So Bad", "Miracle", and "For the Love of You", Promis remarked that the compilation offers little new material for longtime fans. He concluded that Love, Whitney serves primarily as an enjoyable listen for casual listeners rather than a must-have addition for collectors.

In his review for Cane France, the critic offered a sharply ironic take on Love, Whitney, questioning the necessity of another compilation so soon after The Greatest Hits (2000). He criticized the release as a commercial move rather than an artistic one, suggesting it might have been intended to fulfill part of Whitney Houston's new $100 million contract with Arista Records. While acknowledging Houston’s undeniable vocal talent and her impressive string of hits such as "I Will Always Love You," "You Give Good Love," and "I Have Nothing," the reviewer argued that Love, Whitney added little value to her discography. He concluded humorously that the album's title was fitting, since "you really have to love her" to purchase such a redundant compilation.

== Track listing ==
No.	Title	Writer(s)	Producer(s)	Length
1.	"Until You Come Back"	Babyface; Daryl Simmons	Babyface	4:55
2.	"I Have Nothing"	David Foster; Linda Thompson	Foster	4:50
3.	"Why Does It Hurt So Bad"	Babyface	Babyface	4:39
4.	"You Give Good Love"	La La	Kashif	4:38
5.	"All the Man That I Need" (Edit)	Dean Pitchford; Michael Gore	Narada Michael Walden	3:57
6.	"Where Do Broken Hearts Go"	Frank Wildhorn; Chuck Jackson	Walden	4:38
7.	"Just the Lonely Talking Again"	Sam Dees	Walden	5:33
8.	"Exhale (Shoop Shoop)"	Babyface	Babyface	3:24
9.	"Miracle"	L.A. Reid; Babyface	L.A. Reid; Babyface	5:46
10.	"For the Love of You"	O'Kelly Isley Jr.; Ronald Isley; Marvin Isley; Chris Jasper	Walden	5:35
11.	"Saving All My Love for You"	Michael Masser; Gerry Goffin	Masser	3:56
12.	"Run to You"	Allan Rich; Jud Friedman	Foster	4:27
13.	"I Believe in You and Me" (Single Version)	David Wolfert; Sandy Linzer	Mervyn Warren; Houston	3:55
14.	"Didn't We Almost Have It All" (Single Version)	Masser; Will Jennings	Masser	4:38
15.	"All at Once"	Masser; Jeffrey Osborne	Masser	4:29
16.	"I Will Always Love You" (Edit)	Dolly Parton	Foster	4:23
Total length:				73:28

== Charts ==
=== Weekly charts ===
Chart (2001–2002)	Peak position
Argentinian Albums (CAPIF)	20
Austrian Albums (Ö3 Austria)	42
Dutch Albums (Album Top 100)	24
European Top 100 Albums (Music & Media)	44
Greek International Albums (IFPI)	19
Italian Albums (FIMI)	10
Japanese Albums (Oricon)	34
Swedish Albums (Sverigetopplistan)	12
Swiss Albums (Schweizer Hitparade)	37
UK Albums (Official Charts)	22

Chart (2012)	Peak Position
French Albums (SNEP)	167

=== Monthly charts ===
Chart (2001)	Peak position
South Korean Albums (RIAK)	10

Chart (2012)	Peak Position
Polish Albums (ZPAV)	28

== Certifications and sales ==
Region	Certification	Certified units/sales
Brazil (Pro-Música Brasil)	Gold	50,000^{*}
Japan (RIAJ)	Gold	100,000^{^}
South Korea	—	22,356
United Kingdom	—	46,264
^{*} Sales figures based on certification alone.^{^} Shipments figures based on certification alone.
