= Whitney Houston (album) =

Studio album by Whitney Houston
- Released: February 14, 1985
- Recorded: 1983–1984
- Genres: Pop-soul; dance; R&B
- Length: 46:54
- Label: Arista
- Producers: Jermaine Jackson; Kashif; Michael Masser; Narada Michael Walden

Whitney Houston chronology
Whitney Houston (1985)	Whitney Dancin' Special (1986)

Singles from Whitney Houston
- 1. "Hold Me" Released: May 24, 1984; 2. "You Give Good Love" Released: February 22, 1985; 3. "All at Once" Released: March 24, 1985 (Europe); 4. "Saving All My Love for You" Released: August 13, 1985; 5. "Thinking About You" Released: October 1985; 6. "How Will I Know" Released: November 22, 1985; 7. "Greatest Love of All" Released: March 18, 1986

Whitney Houston is the debut studio album by American singer Whitney Houston, released on February 14, 1985, by Arista Records. Whitney Houston initially had a slow commercial response, but began getting more popular in mid-1985. It eventually topped the Billboard 200 for fourteen weeks in 1986, generating three number-one singles—"Saving All My Love for You", "How Will I Know" and "Greatest Love of All"—on the Billboard Hot 100, which made it both the first debut album and the first album by a solo female artist to produce three number-one singles in the United States.

The album topped the albums charts in many countries, including Canada, Australia, Norway, and Sweden, while peaking at number 2 in the United Kingdom, Germany, and Switzerland. The album was certified Diamond for sales of ten million units or more on January 25, 1994, and later 14× Platinum by the Recording Industry Association of America on January 27, 2023. The album is the best-selling debut album by a solo artist, best-selling R&B album by a woman, and is also one of the best selling albums of all time, with sales of over 25 million copies worldwide.

In 1986, at the 28th Grammy Awards, Whitney Houston received four nominations, including Album of the Year, and won one, Best Pop Vocal Performance, Female, for "Saving All My Love for You". For the 29th Grammy Awards of 1987, the album earned one nomination for Record of the Year for "Greatest Love of All". Whitney Houston was the first album by a female artist to be top the Billboard Year End Albums Charts of 1986. The album has also been ranked on Rolling Stone magazine's list of the 500 Greatest Albums of All Time in all three editions. Whitney Houston has had a lasting impact on popular culture.

In honor of its 25th anniversary, the album was reissued as Whitney Houston – The Deluxe Anniversary Edition on January 26, 2010, an expanded edition with five bonus tracks including the a cappella version of "How Will I Know" and the original 12-inch remixes of songs from the album, a booklet on the history of the original album, along with a DVD of live performances and interviews by Whitney Houston and Clive Davis. On June 30, 2020, after the 35th anniversary celebration in February 2020, the album re-issued as a double vinyl including the singles from Whitney Dancin' Special. Also, they released a box set including the 40-page hard cover photo and lyric book.

== Background ==
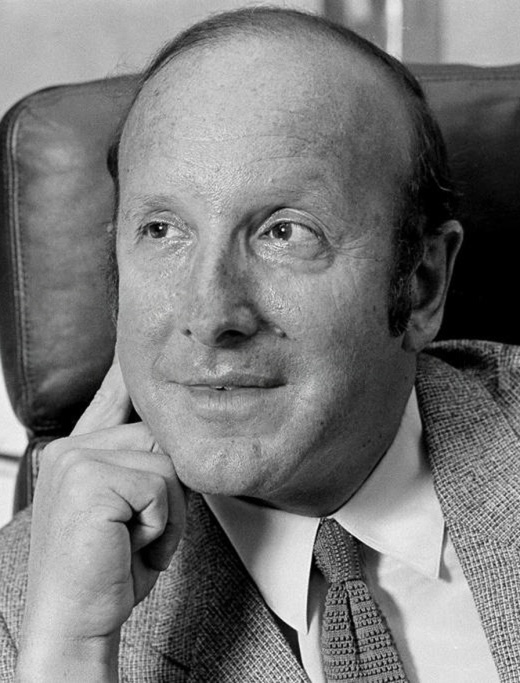
Arista Records president Clive Davis, who signed Houston to the label in 1983, would serve as executive producer on Houston's debut album.

By 1983, Whitney Houston was an aspiring singer who had spent six years in the music industry, first starting as a background singer for her mother Cissy Houston's band during Cissy's performances at exclusive Manhattan jazz nightclubs, and then as a teenage session vocalist for artists such as her mother, the Michael Zager Band, Lou Rawls, Chaka Khan, the Neville Brothers and Herbie Mann among others. In between sessions, Houston ventured into a career as a teen fashion model after being spotted by a photographer who worked for Click Models, working with the agency before being reassigned to Wilhelmina Models. In late 1981, Houston became just the second black model to land the cover of Seventeen. During this period, Houston recorded a trio of gospel demo recordings that further helped develop her vocal abilities, then being trained by her mother. Houston's vocal talent made her sought after for recording deals, but were turned down by her mother, who insisted that Houston finish high school.

After graduating from Mount Saint Dominic Academy in 1981, Houston signed a production deal with Tara Productions, led by Gene Harvey, who subsequently became her manager, with Harvey's partners Daniel Gittleman and Seymour Flics also getting involved. In 1982, Houston auditioned for both Elektra Records and CBS Records, which led to the artist recording songs for both labels. She was a featured vocalist on the Elektra act Material's One Down, singing lead on a rendition of "Memories", released in May 1982. In early 1983, Houston was featured on CBS recording act Paul Jabara's collaborative effort Paul Jabara & Friends, on the quiet storm ballad "Eternal Love". Both efforts were critically praised in music circles, with Robert Christgau, then a journalist for The Village Voice, citing "Memories" as "one of the most gorgeous ballads you've ever heard". Houston continued to perform with her mother during this period, performing at venues such as Reno Sweeney, Mikell's and Sweetwaters. It would be at another jazz club, Seventh Avenue South, around the late winter of 1983 that Gerry Griffith, then-A&R for Arista Records, spotted Houston performing at the club two and a half years after first viewing a performance of hers at another jazz club. Impressed by her performance, the next day he alerted label head Clive Davis to view her performance at Sweetwaters. After seeing her perform the songs "Home" and "The Greatest Love of All", Davis offered her a contract, to which Houston, just 19, signed on April 10, 1983.

Work on the album didn't begin right away, however, as Davis wanted to make sure no other label pursued her and that he had the right material for an album. Houston made her national debut on television in June 1983 on The Merv Griffin Show as Davis' "special guest", where she sang the song "Home", from the Broadway musical The Wiz. At first, Davis struggled to find material and producers for Houston despite elaborate showcases in both New York and Los Angeles; producers turned the offer down due to prior commitments. Houston's management team continued to work with her during this era. In early 1984, she auditioned for — and nearly won the role of — Denise Huxtable in comedian Bill Cosby's then-upcoming family sitcom The Cosby Show, but pulled out due to her emerging musical career. Houston accepted a brief cameo role in another sitcom, Gimme a Break!, and appeared in a commercial for Canada Dry. After producer Michael Masser saw her performing in New York, Masser was granted permission to have Houston record a duet with American soul artist Teddy Pendergrass, recording a rendition of the quiet storm ballad, "Hold Me", which would be first issued on Pendergrass' Asylum Records release Love Language in May 1984. The song would give Houston her first taste of commercial success on the Billboard charts, reaching the top ten on both the R&B and adult contemporary charts, and reaching the US top 50 on the Billboard Hot 100. Around the same time, Jermaine Jackson, who had recently signed to Arista after years recording for Motown, offered to record with her, first on his self-titled album, where they recorded the duet "Take Good Care of My Heart". Another song recorded for the album, "Don't Look Any Further", ended up being discarded after Arista learned the song had been recorded and released by Motown artist Dennis Edwards and singer Siedah Garrett as a duet in April 1984.

== Recording ==
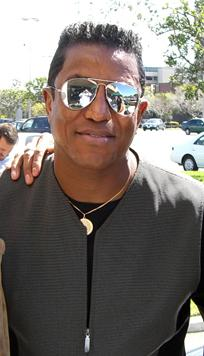
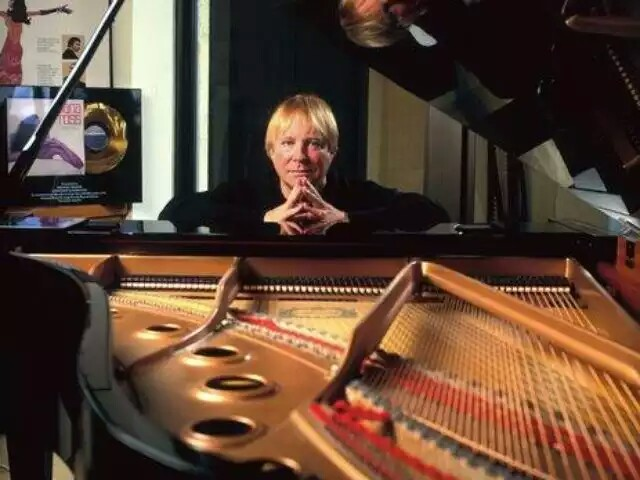
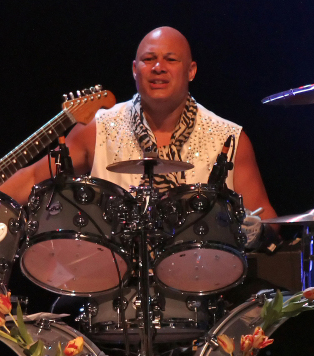
Houston's debut album would feature productions from the likes of Jermaine Jackson, Michael Masser and Narada Michael Walden.

Work on Houston's album, however, wouldn't pick up until American record producer Kashif called Griffith about wanting to give Houston a song he had worked on with songwriter La Forrest Cope titled "You Give Good Love", which had originally been written with soul singer Roberta Flack in mind though Flack's agent turned the offer down. After arriving at Kashif's studios in New Jersey and hearing the song, Houston agreed to record the mid-tempo quiet storm song, doing so in just a single take, according to Griffith. Impressed by her vocal talent, Kashif produced another song, the funk-inflected "Thinking About You", to which he provided background vocals in the chorus to accompany Houston. Houston would end up recording background vocals on Kashif's album Send Me Your Love, most prominently on another quiet storm ballad, "Are You the Woman", to which later Houston received a duet credit. The song peaked at number 25 on the Black Singles chart.

At the same time, Houston reunited with Jermaine Jackson to record more duets, including a rendition of the country ballad "Nobody Loves Me Like You Do", originally recorded and released by Canadian singer Anne Murray in a duet with American singer Dave Loggins. The song was a hit on the Hot Country Songs and adult contemporary charts in its original release, going to number ten on the latter and topping the former. Later in July 1984, Houston and Jackson performed the song, along with "Take Good Care of My Heart", on a two-part episode of the American soap opera As the World Turns. In addition, Jackson produced a light funk song, "Someone for Me". Around August 1984, Masser offered Davis the ballad "Saving All My Love for You", originally written by Masser and lyricist Gerry Goffin for former 5th Dimension vocalist Marilyn McCoo and featured on McCoo and her singing partner husband Billy Davis Jr.'s third album, Marilyn & Billy (1978). Initially, Cissy Houston was against her daughter recording the song due to the song's theme of infidelity and adultery. However, Houston eventually recorded it, allegedly inspired by the fallout of a relationship with a married man, later rumoured to be Jermaine Jackson. The memorable saxophone riffs that accompany the song were played by jazz musician Tom Scott, a former member of the Blues Brothers.

Noting the lack of what he perceived to be crossover pop singles, Davis sought to find a song for Houston to connect with younger audiences. Gerry Griffith got in touch with Brenda Andrews of Almo-Irving Music, who offered him the song "How Will I Know", written by George Merrill and Shannon Rubicam. Merrill and Rubicam had originally offered the song to pop artist Janet Jackson; Jackson's management team, which included A&M Records executive John McClain, rejected the song for Jackson to record. Griffith and Davis approved of the song and then hired Narada Michael Walden, then working on Aretha Franklin's Who's Zoomin' Who album, to produce the session. Initially unimpressed with the song, he asked to rewrite it, which after some time debating back and forth, was allowed. Houston recorded the funk-inflected dance number in October 1984. Both Masser and Houston persuaded Davis to let her record her rendition of "Greatest Love of All", which eventually was done in December. Davis initially didn't want Houston to record it due to the album including multiple love ballads and, after recording it, placed the song as the next-to-last track on the record due to him feeling it wasn't strong enough to be released as a single. "Greatest Love of All" ended up being the final song recorded for the album; Davis decided to add "Hold Me" and "Take Good Care of My Heart" to complete the album. Initially starting on a $200,000 budget, by the time of the album's completion, it had almost doubled to $400,000.

== Critical reception ==
Professional ratings
Review scores
Source	Rating
AllMusic	5/5 stars
Consequence of Sound	A
Entertainment Weekly	A−
Los Angeles Times	3/4 stars
MusicHound Rock	3.5/5 stars
PopMatters	7/10
Q	4/5 stars
The Rolling Stone Album Guide	3/5 stars
The Village Voice	C

Whitney Houston received critical acclaim upon release. In a positive review for The New York Times, Stephen Holden wrote, "along with an appealing romantic innocence, [Houston] projects the commanding dignity and elegance of someone far more mature." Liam Lacey of The Globe and Mail said the "arrangements frequently border on formulaic but such ballads as "Saving All My Love for You", "Greatest Love of All," and "Hold Me" are some of the loveliest pop singing on vinyl since the glory days of Dionne Warwick." Lacey added, "Houston has a silky, rich, vibrant voice that moves between steely edges, or curls sensuously around the notes." Los Angeles Times complimented Houston on her excellent vocal ability, writing, "neither the frequently listless arrangements nor the sometimes mediocre material of this debut LP hides the fact that Houston is a singer with enormous power and potential."

Don Shewey of Rolling Stone described her as "one of the most exciting new voices in years" and stated that: "Because she has a technically polished voice like Patti Austin's, [...] her interpretive approach is what sets her apart" and "Whitney Houston is obviously headed for stardom, and if nothing else, her album is an exciting preview of coming attractions." But he expressed a little disappointment about undistinguished pop-soul tunes, commenting "many of the songs here are so featureless they could be sung by anyone. They make what could have been a stunning debut merely promising." In his consumer guide for The Village Voice, Robert Christgau complimented Houston's "sweet, statuesque voice", but called the songs "schlock" and believed "only one of the four producers puts any zip in—Narada Michael Walden, who goes one for one."

Stephen Thomas Erlewine from AllMusic defined Whitney Houston as "the foundation of diva-pop" and stated that certainly, the ballads such as "Greatest Love of All" and "Saving All My Love for You", provided "the blueprint for decades of divas". However, he gave higher marks to the lighter tracks like "How Will I Know" and "Thinking About You", commenting these tracks "are what really impresses some 20-plus years on" and "turns the album into a fully rounded record, the rare debut that manages to telegraph every aspect of an artist's career in a mere ten songs." Brad Wete, on a feature article to celebrate for Vibe magazine's 15th anniversary in September 2008, wrote "never before has an African-American woman earned such crossover appeal so early in her career. [...] [Houston] had an explosive solo debut" and commented "Whitney's prodigious pop set [...] was a fresh serving of precocious talent compared to 1985's mildly flavored R&B buffet." Allison Stewart from The Washington Post stated that the album "provided a blueprint for the pop/dance/R&B-melding careers of Mariah Carey and others, and introduced the world to 'The Voice', an octave-spanning, gravity-defying melismatic marvel." In The New Rolling Stone Album Guide (2004), music journalist J. D. Considine gave the album three out of five stars and stated, "Although utterly calculating, Whitney Houston does have its moments, particularly when Houston leans toward R&B, as on 'You Give Good Love.'"

== Commercial performance ==
Released on February 14, 1985, Whitney Houston debuted on the Billboard Top Albums Chart the week of March 30, 1985, at number 166. Sales were low initially. However, with the success of the first single "You Give Good Love", the album began climbing the charts and finally reached the number one spot on the Billboard Top Black Albums chart in June and the top 10 on the Billboard 200 (formerly "Top Pop Albums") in August 1985. After fifty-five weeks on the chart, successive hit singles and Grammy wins led to the album eventually topping the Billboard 200 album chart in March 1986. It was the slowest climb to the top of the charts since Fleetwood Mac took fifty-eight weeks to reach the top in 1976. The album quickly became a huge commercial success, selling over 14 million copies worldwide by 1987.

Whitney Houston spent fourteen non-consecutive weeks at the top of the Billboard 200 chart from March until late June 1986, which was short of one week for Carole King's record of fifteen weeks for the longest running No. 1 album by a female artist at the time. It was the second-longest running No.1 album among the debut albums in Billboard history, behind Men at Work's Business as Usual, which had fifteen weeks on top in 1982–83. Its fourteen-week tenure atop the Billboard 200 remains a record for a female debut artist and for a black female studio release as of 2026. The album remained on the Billboard 200 for one hundred and sixty-two weeks. It also spent forty-six weeks in the Top 10, equaling Carole King's record with Tapestry; this record was broken in the 1990s. Houston's debut was the best-selling album of 1986 in the United States and the No. 1 album of the year on 1986 Billboard year-end charts, making her the first female artist to earn that distinction. She became also the number 1 pop artist of the year, according to Billboard. The RIAA certified it Diamond on March 16, 1999, and later 14× Platinum on January 27, 2023, for shipments of 14 million copies of the album in the United States.

The album was successful worldwide. In the United Kingdom, it peaked at number 2 on the albums chart, spending one hundred and nineteen weeks on the chart. It was certified 4× Platinum for shipments of 1,200,000 units of the album by the British Phonographic Industry (BPI), becoming the fifth best-selling album of 1986. In Canada, the album reached the top spot on the albums chart and remained there for seventeen weeks, becoming the longest stay at the summit by a female artist. On March 31, 1987, it was certified 10× Platinum for sales of over one million copies, making it the best-selling album of 1986, and later Diamond by the Canadian Recording Industry Association (CRIA). Whitney Houston was also the best-selling album of 1986 in Australia, staying at number 1 on the Kent Music Report albums chart for eleven weeks, the longest stay by a female artist at the time. It was additionally the first number 1 album by a Black female artist there. In Japan, the album was the second best-selling album of 1986 by a foreign artist, selling a total of 450,000 units, only behind Madonna's True Blue. In addition, the album reached number 1 on the albums chart in Norway for ten weeks, Sweden for six weeks and South Africa for five weeks, number 2 in Germany, Switzerland, and number 3 in Austria and New Zealand. According to the Nielsen SoundScan began tracking sales data in 1991, as of 2009, the album sold over 1,038,000 copies in the United States. The week ending of February 25, 2012, following Houston's death on February 11, the album re-charted on the Billboard 200 at No. 72 with 8,000 copies sold.

== Accolades ==
At the 28th Grammy Awards in 1986, Whitney Houston received four nominations—Album of the Year, Best Female Pop Vocal Performance for "Saving All My Love for You", Best Female R&B Vocal Performance for "You Give Good Love" and Best Rhythm & Blues Song for "You Give Good Love"—and won Houston's first Grammy, Best Pop Vocal Performance, Female. In addition, the album earned one nomination for Record of the Year in 1987 for "Greatest Love of All".

The album received good response from major publications. Three major critics of the Los Angeles Times listed the album on their year end critics list. The album ranked No. 79 on Robert Hilburn's list, No. 2 on Paul Grein's list and No. 5 on Dennis Hunt's list. In November 2003, the album was ranked No. 254 on Rolling Stone's publication of the 500 greatest albums of all time, and 257 in a 2012 revised list. Then ranked 249 in a 2020 revised list It also ranked No. 46 on the Rock and Roll Hall of Fame's Definitive 200 List in 2007. In 2000, it was voted number 740 in Colin Larkin's All Time Top 1000 Albums. It was also ranked number 40 in the Soul/R&B – All Time Top 50 albums. It wrote “although she has now been eclipsed by younger female stars, Houston will stand as the first to bring this type of clean soul music to the world.” In addition, ranked No. 71 on Q magazine's "100 Women Who Rock The World" in 2002 and No. 15 on Yahoo! Music's 30 Most Significant Albums In Black Music History list in 2010, with Brandy's comments on the album; "The first Whitney Houston CD was genius. That CD introduced the world to her angelic yet powerful voice. Without Whitney many of this generation of singers wouldn't be singing." In 2013, the album was inducted into the Grammy Hall of Fame. In 2018, Pitchfork placed Whitney Houston at number 117 on their newly revised list of "200 Best Albums of the 1980s".

=== Best New Artist controversy ===
Although the album was nominated in four categories at the 28th Grammy Awards, Houston was not nominated for Best New Artist that year due to National Academy of Recording Arts and Sciences (NARAS) regulations, which caused some controversy. Although Whitney Houston was Houston's debut album, she was disqualified as a new artist because she had been credited in 1984 as a guest vocalist on the Jermaine Jackson album Dynamite as well as the Teddy Pendergrass album Love Language. Per NARAS rules, any previous album credit disqualifies an artist from the Best New Artist award.

Clive Davis, then the president of Arista Records, sent a letter of complaint to NARAS president Michael Greene disputing the disqualification. He also wrote to Billboard magazine, noting that the rule had been applied much less strictly in previous years. According to Davis, artists including Cyndi Lauper, Luther Vandross, the Power Station, Carly Simon, and Crosby, Stills & Nash, had already received credits on other albums or been previously well known as a member of other acts prior to their nominations for the Best New Artist award. He referred to the disqualification as "a conspicuous injustice".

Despite the criticism, NARAS did not back down from the disqualification. Greene, in a statement, said that "The determination of eligibility or ineligibility in the best new artist category is not made capriciously or taken lightly." He also noted that the duets with Jackson and Pendergrass had been submitted for consideration for the 27th Grammy Awards, which he said "was sufficient to make her ineligible this year for best new artist according to academy criteria." The 1986 award eventually went to British band Sade.

American singer Richard Marx was similarly ruled ineligible for nomination as Best New Artist in 1988. In an interview with Orange Coast magazine, he referred to the Houston controversy, saying "I don't have a lot of respect for N.A.R.A.S., the Grammy people's ruling system, because it's so inconsistent. They deemed me and Whitney Houston ineligible, and yet they nominated Jody Watley, who made records with Shalamar." In 2000, Geoff Mayfield of Billboard magazine also criticized NARAS for inconsistency with the Best New Artist rules, specifically referencing their disqualification of Houston and nomination of Watley.

== Singles ==
The label, wanting Houston to have a solid urban fan base first, released "You Give Good Love" as the first single. The soulful ballad would top the R&B chart and surprise the label by crossing over and reaching number 3 on the pop chart while the singer was playing at nightclubs in the United States. The jazzy-pop "Saving All My Love for You" (originally a minor hit for Marilyn McCoo and Billy Davis Jr. in 1978 on their album Marilyn & Billy) was released next and really put her on the map. The single was an even bigger success hitting number 1 on the Billboard Hot 100 chart. It would reach number 1 in the United Kingdom and was successful around the world. With her first number 1, Houston began appearing on high-profile talk shows and became the opening act for Jeffrey Osborne and Luther Vandross. "Thinking About You" was released as the single only to R&B-oriented radio stations. It peaked at number 10 on the Hot Black Singles chart and at number 24 on the Hot Dance/Disco Club Play chart.

At the end of 1985, "How Will I Know" was released as the official third single. With its colorful and energetic video, the song brought the singer to the teen audience and MTV, which black artists had found tough to crack. It became another number 1 single for Houston, topping both the Billboard Hot 100 Singles chart and Hot Black Singles chart. The final single, "Greatest Love of All", a cover of the George Benson song of the same name, became the biggest hit off the album with a three-week stay atop the Hot 100. As a result, the parent album became the first debut album—and the first album by a female artist—ever to generate three number 1 singles. With "Greatest Love of All" and Houston's debut album both at No. 1 on the singles and albums chart respectively, she became the first female artist to have the number 1 pop single and album simultaneously since Kim Carnes in 1981 with "Bette Davis Eyes" and Mistaken Identity. "All at Once" was released only to adult contemporary and urban AC stations as a radio airplay-only single later in 1986. It received heavy airplay and can still be heard on AC stations. However, the single received an official release in Japan and many European countries. "Take Good Care of my Heart" (as a duet with Jermaine Jackson) was also released as a radio-airplay single in Panama, becoming a success in the country, reaching No. 2.

== Promotion and appearances ==
Between February 12 and 19, 1985, Houston made her debut as a headliner at Sweetwaters in downtown Manhattan, where she premiered songs from her debut. The Sweetwaters gigs began Houston's trek across the country where she performed at various rock nightclubs and small venues such as Park West and the Roxy Theatre during the first couple of months after the album's release. On April 5, 1985, Houston made her debut on The Tonight Show Starring Johnny Carson, singing "You Give Good Love". The performance was considered a breakthrough since younger black artists rarely got on late-night talk shows.

Shortly after this performance, Houston began her first promotional tour of Europe, where she appeared on various programs in the Netherlands, France and Switzerland. One particular show, the Dutch TV show, Show Van de Maand, Houston appeared on April 19, where she sang "On the Other Side of the Hill" (or "Aan de Andere Kant Van de Heuvels" in native Dutch) with Dutch singer Liesbeth List, who recorded the hit single originally in 1971. Prior to Houston's arrival, List announced her as one of "the best upcoming singers of 1985". After a brief interview, Houston performed "Greatest Love of All". On April 20, she returned to the United States where she appeared on the popular urban dance show, Soul Train, performing "You Give Good Love" and "How Will I Know". Nine days later, on April 29, she returned to The Merv Griffin Show where she performed "How Will I Know" and "You Give Good Love". During the performance of "How Will I Know", Houston nearly had a wardrobe malfunction when parts of her blouse came undone, nearly exposing her breast. Houston quickly fixed her blouse and finished the performance but not without playfully screaming at the cameras about the near-mishap. On August 28, 1985, just as "Saving All My Love for You" was being released to radio, Houston performed the song on her first appearance of Late Night with David Letterman. A month later, on September 15, Houston appeared in a guest cameo spot on the sitcom Silver Spoons in the episode "Head Over Heels", where she appeared opposite Franklyn Seales' character Dexter Stuffins, who falls "head over heels" for Houston and follows her to L.A. During the episode, she sang a g-rated version of "Saving All My Love You", changing the lyric "making love the whole night through" to "holding each other the whole night through" to avoid censors. It was the singer's first acting role since appearing as Rita in an episode of Gimme a Break! in March 1984. On December 4, 1985, shortly after the release of "How Will I Know", Houston returned to The Tonight Show Starring Johnny Carson performing "Saving All My Love for You" and is interviewed by the show's guest host of the night, Joan Rivers.

Houston would make her awards show debut at the 1986 American Music Awards, where she performed "How Will I Know" after being introduced by host Diana Ross as "the most promising female vocalist". Despite an early problem with the sound system, Houston gives a command performance of the song, which ends with cheers and applause. Houston would later win two awards out of six nominations that night, including Favorite Soul/R&B Single for "You Give Good Love". A month later, on February 25, Houston appeared at the 28th Annual Grammy Awards where she performed a captivating rendition of "Saving All My Love for You". Not too long after her performance, she wins her first Grammy for Best Female Pop Vocal Performance and was presented the award by Julian Lennon and cousin Dionne Warwick, who famously cheered Houston's name upon opening the envelope. Later in September of the year, Houston wins an Emmy Award for Outstanding Individual Performance in a Variety or Music Program. On April 5, Houston appeared on the French talk show, Champs-Élysées where she performed "Saving All My Love for You". At the time, the show was the most watched Saturday evening show in France. After singing "Saving All My Love for You", Houston was brought by presenter Michel Drucker over to the couch where she sat next to acclaimed French artist Serge Gainsbourg, who was visibly drunk. Gainsbourg then said to Houston in heavily accented English, "I want to f**k you". Houston was visibly stunned by the singer's crude display of appreciation, but stayed nonetheless and later sang a duet with Gainsbourg before the end of the show. On the Fourth of July 1986 during Liberty Weekend, Houston gave a memorable performance at the Americana music concert at Liberty State Park, performing "America the Beautiful" and "Greatest Love of All", performing the latter during heavy periods of wind. On September 5, Houston appeared at the 1986 MTV Video Music Awards at the Universal Amphitheatre in Universal City, California, performing "How Will I Know" and "Greatest Love of All" and later winning the MTV Video Music Award for Best Female Video.

On January 26, 1987, Houston performed "All at Once" at the 1987 American Music Awards; at the time, the ballad was being promoted mainly to AC radio in the United States where it was successful. Later that night, Houston would win five of the seven AMAs she was nominated for including Favorite Pop/Rock Female Artist and Favorite Soul/R&B Female Artist, while the album won Favorite Album in both the pop and soul categories. During her accepting the AMA for Favorite Soul/R&B Female Artist, the singer wept as the audience, which included mother Cissy Houston, stood up to give the singer a standing ovation. A month later, Houston gave performances at the Sanremo Music Festival and Brit Awards; on the former, she sang "All at Once". Her performance was received so well by the predominantly Italian audience that she returned on the show to perform it again, the first time this had occurred in the festival's history. At the Brit Awards, Houston performed "How Will I Know". That same month, she performed "Greatest Love of All" at the 29th Annual Grammy Awards. In March, she performed at the inaugural Soul Train Music Awards, singing "You Give Good Love" more than two years after its release and later joined fellow soul artists Luther Vandross, Stevie Wonder and Dionne Warwick to perform a rendition of the latter's hit, "That's What Friends Are For".

=== Tours ===
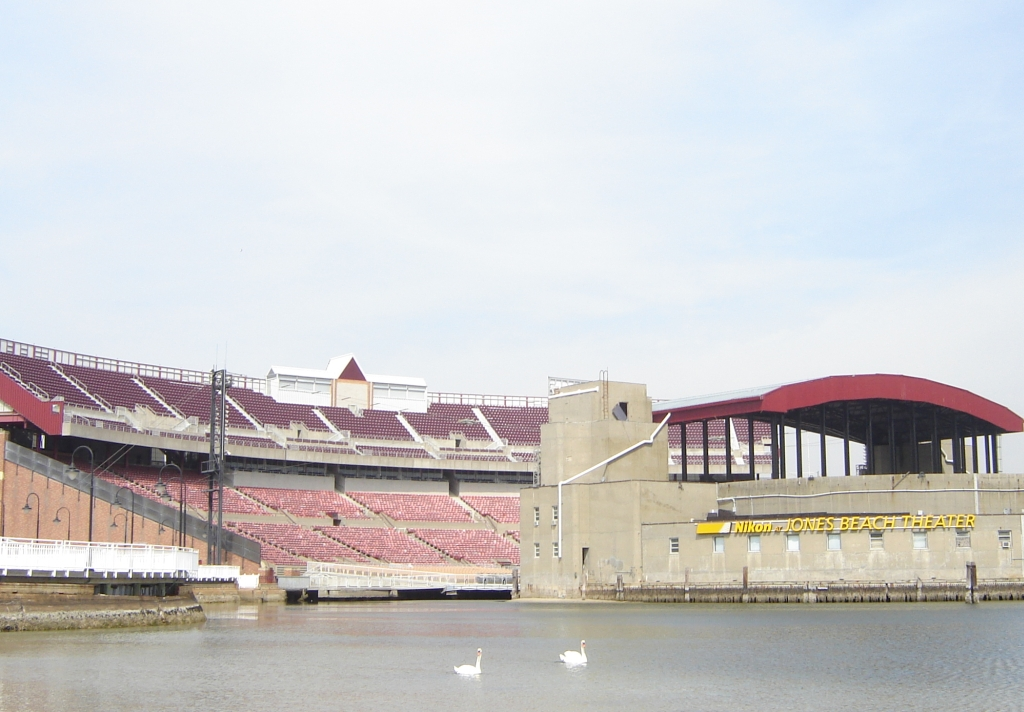
Jones Beach Theater at Wantagh, New York was one of the first stops of Houston's first headlining world tour, The Greatest Love World Tour.

Starting on June 3, 1985, Houston began opening for fellow R&B singer Jeffrey Osborne, the artist who helped to pen Houston's European hit, "All at Once" on the album, starting off what would become her first tour, the US Tour. According to some concert reviews, the then 21-year-old singer, whose "You Give Good Love" had become a hit, stole the show from the more seasoned Osborne. On some dates, Houston opened a few shows for longtime friend, Luther Vandross, at bigger venues such as The Summit, which was taped with several performances being shown online and in the 2018 documentary, Whitney. Starting with two shows at Humphrey's by the Bay in San Diego on August 28 as her album was now climbing up the top twenty on the pop album charts, Houston began headlining her own concerts, culminating in her opening at Carnegie Hall on October 28, two days after "Saving All My Love for You" topped the Billboard Hot 100. The tour officially ended at the Universal Amphitheatre on December 1. During the tour, Houston performed virtually most of the songs on the album and added covers of other tunes such as Lionel Richie's "Love Will Find a Way" and "I Am Changing" from Dreamgirls, which generated the most rousing cheers and ovation for Houston. On her second stop at Carnegie Hall on November 20, Houston opened the show with Vandross' "A Brand New Day" and joined mother Cissy and half-brother Gary Garland to perform the songs "When I First Saw You" and "Family" from Dreamgirls. In all, Houston performed 58 dates during the seven-month tour.

On July 26, 1986, Houston launched her first headlining tour, the Greatest Love World Tour at the Merriweather Post Pavilion in Columbia, Maryland, which kept much of the same set list but added "Wanna Be Startin' Somethin'" by Michael Jackson, one of her earlier songs, "Eternal Love", from her 1983 collaboration with Paul Jabara, her 1984 hit "Hold Me", "Take Good Care of My Heart", "Heart to Heart" by Kenny Loggins, her first gospel cover, "He/I Believe", and a full version of "Greatest Love of All". Later on in the tour, Houston performed two songs from her then-upcoming sophomore album, Whitney — "Didn't We Almost Have It All" and "I Wanna Dance with Somebody (Who Loves Me)". The concert tour took the artist to four continents including North America, Europe, Oceania and Asia. Houston performed a total of 37 mostly sold-out dates in North America. In the continent of Europe, Houston performed at three countries including Belgium, Netherlands and the United Kingdom, where she gave out four back-to-back sold-out performances at London's Wembley Arena. Houston only performed in Japan during the Asian leg of the tour, including two sold-out gigs at the Festival Hall, Osaka in Osaka and three sold-out gigs at the Nippon Budokan in Tokyo. Houston ended the tour at the Blaisdell Arena in Honolulu on December 1. In total, Houston performed a total of 55 dates on the five-month tour and generated a reported $5 million from less than half of the dates that were calculated.

== Legacy ==
According to Justin Kantor for the Seattle Post-Intelligencer, Houston's success on pop radio, starting with "You Give Good Love", "opened the floodgates for big-voiced female R&B singers in the 'crossover' market of the 1980's and '90s." The song's producer Kashif added in the same article, "[You Give Good Love] took my career to a whole new level and helped to cement my status as an elite producer. For that I am eternally grateful to Whitney." Kantor further stated that Houston "transformed the landscape of commercial R&B for further African-American songwriters and producers whose work had previously been overlooked by top-40 programmers," adding that the album's black collaborators — Narada Michael Walden, Preston Glass and LeMel Humes — benefited from working on the album. "Greatest Love of All", according to Kantor, "forever secure[d] [Houston's] prominent place in universal pop culture and the lives of countless millions... bec[oming] the soundtrack to graduations and celebrations of achievements everywhere." The album, according to Consequence of Sound, reached a massive level of cross-over that was unprecedented at the time for a black female music artist. In 2017, NPR ranked the album 14th place in its list of the 150 greatest albums made by female artists. Sputnikmusic called the album "one of the warmest, most complex and altogether satisfying rhythm and blues records of the decade and Whitney herself has a voice that defies belief." Classic Pop stated the album "not only launched Whitney's career but redefined the meaning of the term pop idol, introducing mainstream audiences to a vocal style more in tune with gospel music than the charts." The album was considered by The Express Tribune in 2025 to be one of the "most legendary solo debuts" to be released, writing "her debut wasn’t just successful — it made her one of the most celebrated artists in music history." The album was ranked number 85 on New Nation's June 2004 list of The Top 100 Black Albums.

The album became the first by a female artist to top the Billboard Year End Pop Albums list in 1986. In Australia, the album topped the charts for eleven consecutive weeks, marking the first time in history that a black woman topped the album charts there. In addition to the US, the album topped the year-end charts in Australia and Canada, breaking even more barriers, while being just the second album by a black woman after Tina Turner's Private Dancer, to top the year-end charts in Switzerland. With global sales of 25 million, it has been cited by the Guinness World Records as the most successful solo debut album in history, the most successful female debut release and the best-selling studio album by a female R&B artist in the United States. On January 25, 1994, the album became the first studio release by a female artist to be certified 10× Platinum. In 2004, Billboard picked the enormous success of her debut album release on the charts as one of 110 Musical Milestones in its history.

== Track listing ==
No.	Title	Writer(s)	Producer(s)	Length
1.	"You Give Good Love"	La La	Kashif	4:37
2.	"Thinking About You"	Kashif; La La	Kashif	5:24
3.	"Someone for Me"	Freddie Washington; Raymond Jones	Jermaine Jackson	4:58
4.	"Saving All My Love for You"	Gerry Goffin; Michael Masser	Michael Masser	3:58
5.	"Nobody Loves Me Like You Do" (duet with Jermaine Jackson)	Pamela Phillips; James Dunne	Jackson	3:48
6.	"How Will I Know"	George Merrill; Shannon Rubicam; Narada Michael Walden	Walden	4:35
7.	"All at Once"	Masser; Jeffrey Osborne	Masser	4:28
8.	"Take Good Care of My Heart" (duet with Jermaine Jackson)	Steve Dorff; Pete McCann		4:15
9.	"Greatest Love of All"	Masser; Linda Creed	Masser	4:51
10.	"Hold Me" (duet with Teddy Pendergrass)	Masser; Creed	Masser	6:00
Total length:				46:54

25th anniversary deluxe edition (bonus tracks)
No.	Title	Remixer(s)	Length
11.	"Thinking About You" (12" dance remix)	Bruce Forest	7:16
12.	"Someone for Me" (12" dance remix)	Alan "The Judge" Coulthard	7:24
13.	"How Will I Know" (a cappella)	—	3:59
14.	"How Will I Know" (12" dance remix)	John "Jellybean" Benitez	6:32
15.	"Greatest Love of All" (live at Radio City Music Hall on March 9, 1990, during a gala concert celebrating the 15th anniversary of Arista Records)		7:06

25th anniversary deluxe edition (bonus DVD)
No.	Title	Length
1.	"Conversations with Whitney Houston and Clive Davis"	9:30
2.	"Home" (live from The Merv Griffin Show on June 23, 1983)	4:45
3.	"I Am Changing" (live from the Arista Records 10th Anniversary celebration on December 1, 1984)	4:52
4.	"You Give Good Love" (live from the 1st Soul Train Music Awards on March 23, 1987)	4:17
5.	"You Give Good Love" (promo music video)	4:07
6.	"Saving All My Love for You" (promo music video)	3:56
7.	"How Will I Know" (promo music video)	4:31
8.	"Greatest Love of All" (promo music video)	4:52

Japanese and USSR edition (USSR pressings omit "Hold Me")
No.	Title	Writer(s)	Producer(s)	Length
1.	"How Will I Know"	George Merrill; Shannon Rubicam; Narada Michael Walden	Walden	4:35
2.	"All at Once"	Jeffrey Osborne; Masser	Masser	4:28
3.	"Take Good Care of My Heart" (duet with Jermaine Jackson)	Peter McCann; Steve Dorff	Jackson	4:15
4.	"Greatest Love of All"	Linda Creed; Masser	Masser	4:51
5.	"Hold Me" (duet with Teddy Pendergrass)	Masser	Masser	6:00
6.	"You Give Good Love"	La La	Kashif	4:37
7.	"Thinking About You"	La La	Kashif	5:24
8.	"Someone for Me"	Raymond Jones; Freddie Washington	Jermaine Jackson	4:58
9.	"Saving All My Love for You"	Gerry Goffin; Michael Masser	Masser	3:58
10.	"Nobody Loves Me Like You Do" (duet with Jermaine Jackson)	James P. Dunne; Pamela Phillips	Jackson	3:48
Total length:				47:23

== Personnel ==
- Whitney Houston – lead vocals, vocal arrangements
- Jermaine Jackson – duet vocals, producer, background vocals
- Teddy Pendergrass – duet vocals
- Premik Russell Tubbs – saxophone
- Tom Scott – saxophone ("Saving All My Love for You")
- John Barnes (American musician) – clarinet and keyboards
- Robbie Buchanan – keyboards
- Randy Kerber – keyboards
- Yvonne Lewis – keyboards
- Richard Marx – keyboards, background vocals
- Nathan East – bass
- Freddie Washington – bass
- Randy Jackson – bass
- Preston Glass – synthesizer
- Greg Phillinganes – synthesizer
- Ed Greene – drums
- John "J.R." Robinson – drums
- J.T. Lewis – drums
- Steve Rucker – drums
- Paul Leim – drums
- Cissy Houston – background vocals
- Julia Waters Tillman – background vocals
- Maxine Willard Waters – background vocals
- Oren Waters – background vocals
- Yogi Lee – background vocals
- Mary Canty – background vocals
- Deborah Thomas – background vocals
- Paul Jackson, Jr. – guitar
- Dann Huff – guitar
- Tim May – guitar
- Ira Siegel – guitar
- Bashiri Johnson – percussion
- David Williams – guitar
- Louie Shelton – guitar
- Corrado Rustici – guitar
- Michael Masser – producer
- Clive Davis – executive producer
- Michael Barbiero – mixing, engineer
- Michael Mancini – engineer
- Michael O'Reilly – mixing, engineer
- Russell Schmitt – engineer
- Bill Schnee – mixing
- Gene Page Jr. – arrangements
- Kashif – arrangements, producer, background vocals
- Meli'sa Morgan - background vocals
- Narada Michael Walden – arrangements, producer
- Donn Davenport – art direction
- Garry Gross – photographer
- Tiagi Lambert – fashion stylist
- Giovanne De Maura – gown
- Norma Kamali – bathing suit
- Quietfire – makeup
- Brenda Gorsky – coordinator
- Jeffrey Woodly – hair stylist

== Charts ==
=== Weekly charts ===
1985–1986 weekly chart performance
Chart (1985–1986)	Peak position
Australian Albums (Kent Music Report)	1
Austrian Albums (Ö3 Austria)	9
Canada Top Albums/CDs (RPM)	1
Dutch Albums (Album Top 100)	5
European Top 100 Albums (Music & Media)	3
French Albums (SNEP)	13
German Albums (Offizielle Top 100)	2
Icelandic Albums (IFPI)	2
Italian Albums (Musica e dischi)	1
Japanese Albums (Music Labo)	4
New Zealand Albums (RMNZ)	3
Norwegian Albums (VG-lista)	1
Swedish Albums (Sverigetopplistan)	1
Swiss Albums (Schweizer Hitparade)	2
UK Albums (Official Charts)	2
UK Dance Albums (Music Week)	2
US Billboard 200	1
US Top R&B/Hip-Hop Albums (Billboard)	1

2010 weekly chart performance
Chart (2010)	Peak position
South Korean Albums (Circle) CD+DVD Deluxe Anniversary Edition	91
US Billboard 200	164

2012 weekly chart performance
Chart (2012)	Peak position
Austrian Albums (Ö3 Austria)	44
German Albums (Offizielle Top 100)	86
Italian Albums (FIMI)	72
Japan Top Albums Sales (Billboard Japan)	53
South Korean International Albums (Circle)	33
Swiss Albums (Schweizer Hitparade)	76
UK Album Downloads (Official Charts)	65
UK R&B Albums (Official Charts)	18
US Billboard 200	9

2023 weekly chart performance
Chart (2023)	Peak position
Belgian Albums (Ultratop Wallonia)	164
Danish Vinyl Albums (Hitlisten)	17
German Albums (Offizielle Top 100)	91
Scottish Albums (Official Charts)	51
Spanish Vinyl Albums (Promusicae)	16
Swiss Albums (Schweizer Hitparade)	98
UK R&B Albums (Official Charts)	3

=== Year-end charts ===
1985 year-end chart performance
Chart (1985)	Position
Canada Top Albums/CDs (RPM)	30
New Zealand Albums (RMNZ)	26
US Top Pop Albums (Billboard)	29
US Top Black Albums (Billboard)	4

1986 year-end chart performance
Chart (1986)	Position
Australian Albums (Kent Music Report)	1
Austrian Albums (Ö3 Austria)	17
Canada Top Albums/CDs (RPM)	1
Dutch Albums (Album Top 100)	8
European Top 100 Albums (Music & Media)	4
German Albums (Offizielle Top 100)	4
New Zealand Albums (RMNZ)	3
Swiss Albums (Schweizer Hitparade)	1
UK Albums (Music Week)	5
UK Disco Albums (Music Week)	5
US Top Pop Albums (Billboard)	1
US Top Black Albums (Billboard)	1

1987 year-end chart performance
Chart (1987)	Position
Canada Top Albums/CDs (RPM)	78
European Top 100 Albums (Music & Media)	76
New Zealand Albums (RMNZ)	36
US Top Pop Albums (Billboard)	22

2012 year-end chart performance
Chart (2012)	Position
US Billboard 200	198

=== All-time charts ===
All-time chart performance
Chart	Position
US Billboard 200	11
US Billboard 200 (Women)	6

== Certifications and sales ==
Certifications and sales
Region	Certification	Certified units/sales
Australia (ARIA)	5× Platinum	350,000
Austria (IFPI Austria)	Platinum	50,000^{*}
Belgium (BRMA)	Gold	25,000^{*}
Brazil	—	250,000
Canada (Music Canada)	Diamond	1,000,000^{^}
Denmark (IFPI Danmark) 1985–1986 sales	Gold	50,000^{^}
Denmark (IFPI Danmark) sales + streams since 2014	Platinum	20,000^{‡}
Finland (Musiikkituottajat)	Gold	29,109
France (SNEP)	Gold	100,000^{*}
Germany (BVMI)	Platinum	500,000^{^}
Hong Kong (IFPI Hong Kong)	Platinum	20,000^{*}
Italy (FIMI)	Platinum	250,000
Japan (RIAJ)	Gold	300,000
Netherlands (NVPI)	Platinum	100,000^{^}
New Zealand (RMNZ)	2× Platinum	30,000^{^}
Norway (IFPI Norway)	Platinum	100,000
South Africa (RISA)	Gold	25,000^{*}
Sweden (GLF)	2× Platinum	200,000^{^}
Switzerland (IFPI Switzerland)	Platinum	50,000^{^}
United Kingdom (BPI)	4× Platinum	1,200,000^{^}
United States (RIAA)	14× Platinum	14,000,000^{‡}
Summaries
Worldwide	—	25,000,000
^{*} Sales figures based on certification alone.^{^} Shipments figures based on certification alone.^{‡} Sales+streaming figures based on certification alone.

== See also ==
- List of best-selling albums
- List of best-selling albums by women
- List of best-selling albums in the United States
- List of Top 40 albums for 1980–1989 in Australia
- List of diamond-certified albums in Canada
