= Thinking About You (Whitney Houston song) =

Single by Whitney Houston

from the album Whitney Houston
- B-side: "Someone for Me"
- Released: January 11, 1985 (promotional single); October 1985 (R&B radio single)
- Recorded: 1984
- Genre: Dance; R&B; funk
- Length: 5:24
- Label: Arista
- Songwriters: Kashif; La La
- Producer: Kashif

Whitney Houston singles chronology
"Saving All My Love for You" (1985)	"Thinking About You" (1985)	"How Will I Know" (1985)

Licensed audio
- "Thinking About You" on YouTube

"Thinking About You" is a song recorded by American singer Whitney Houston. It was written by Kashif and La Forrest "La La" Cope for Houston's debut studio album Whitney Houston (1985), while production was helmed by the former. Initially released as a promotional single on January 11, 1985, by Houston's label Arista Records, the label later released it as a radio-only single to R&B stations and as a vinyl single for American dance clubs in October 1985.

The song wasn't promoted as a commercial single to Top 40 radio, therefore the song never entered the Billboard Hot 100 or the Cashbox Top 100 but was a hit on the R&B charts in both, becoming Houston's fourth consecutive Top 10 on Billboard's Hot Black Singles chart and the Cashbox Black Contemporary Singles chart, peaking at the tenth and eighth positions respectively, while also becoming Houston's first Billboard entry on the Hot Dance Club Songs chart. It later appeared as the B-side to Houston's 1986 single, "Greatest Love of All".

== Background and recording ==
Whitney Houston began working with R&B producer Kashif in the late summer of 1983 after the producer decided on working with the teenage singer after catching her performance of "Home" from The Wiz on The Merv Griffin Show. The producer and fellow Arista label mate, who had worked with singers such as Evelyn "Champagne" King and Melba Moore, had initially turned Houston down due to her performances in which Houston performed "lounge music" but changed his mind.

Kashif had begun collaborating with singer-songwriter La Forrest 'La La' Cope after Cope signed to Kashif's publishing company. Through Cope, Kashif presented Arista executive Gerry Griffith the mid-tempo R&B song "You Give Good Love", which he approved and Houston subsequently recorded. Kashif and Cope decided on collaborating on a second track for Houston they came up with called "Thinking About You", which Kashif admitted was "loosely put together".

The uptempo synth-heavy track featured Houston doing both lead and background vocals and featured Kashif himself as an uncredited male vocalist on the song during its chorus. Additional background vocals were recorded by La La and fellow singer Meli'sa Morgan. Kashif added in a rock guitar part and bass marimbas during the song's post-production. Houston later added background vocals on the producer's own Send Me Your Love album, particularly on the top 30 R&B chart hit "Are You the Woman". Initially not credited to Houston, in later editions of his album, Houston's name was added.

Arista boss Clive Davis included both "Thinking About You" and "You Give Good Love" on the final track listing of Houston's self-titled debut album.

== Release and chart performance ==
"Thinking About You" was released first as a promotional single on January 11, 1985. A month later, "You Give Good Love" became Houston's official leading single off her debut album, Whitney Houston. After Houston found crossover success with "You Give Good Love" and "Saving All My Love for You", Arista decided to re-release "Thinking About You" in October 1985, primarily to R&B radio, while vinyl copies were sent to dance clubs across the country.

The song debuted at number 76 on the Hot Black Singles chart on October 19, 1985. On December 14, 1985, the song reached its peak position of number 10. It spent 15 weeks on the chart. It was Houston's fourth consecutive top ten single on the R&B chart and her fourth R&B hit from her self-titled debut album. The song debuted at number 50 on the Hot Dance/Disco Club Play chart on November 16, 1985. On December 7, 1985, the song reached its peak position of number 24, becoming her first top 40 entry. It spent six weeks on the chart.

== Critical reception ==
In the October 19, 1985 issue of Billboard, it stated "new star [Houston] should have no trouble parlaying her pop prominence into club action with this crisp, cool Kashif production; upbeat rhythms in an elegant manner."

In his 1997 biography of Houston, Ted Cox dismissed it as a "formulaic, somewhat stiff mid-1980s pop-funk song in the Madonna mold," and felt the production was "worse" than the composition, blaming Kashif for "echo[ing] Houston's vocals and blur[ring] the fine points of her singing."

In 2015, on the thirtieth anniversary of her debut album's release, Billboard reviewed the song among all of the ten songs on Houston's debut and claimed Houston was "channel[ing] (Chaka) Khan as she layers on the confident swagger" and compared her spoken monologue in the song to Diana Ross's rendition of "Ain't No Mountain High Enough". AllMusic editor Stephen Thomas Erlewine called the track "unheralded" and one of the lighter songs on the album, as well as "a dance/R&B hit [...] that remains one of Whitney's purest pop pleasures".

== Legacy ==
=== Accolades ===
In their list of 40 Best Whitney Houston Songs, BET ranked the song 29th place, writing that Houston "knew how to counterbalance her pop grandiloquence with some good old-fashioned rhythm and blues from the very beginning."

Slant ranked "Thinking About You" as Houston's 11th best song, writing that it was a "deeply seductive gem—and one of the most teasingly erotic of all her dance-floor jams."

It was ranked the 35th best Whitney Houston song on GoldDerby's list. The site stated the song was Mariah Carey's favorite song of Houston's.

=== Covers and samples ===
In 2013, British singer and deejay Yasmin covered the song and first released it on her Soundcloud account. Later, the Yasmin version was remixed by another London-based producer Billon. The original song by Houston has been sampled by several musicians such as Eli Escobar, Cyberlust, Moon Boots and Coco & Breezy featuring Sam White.

== Formats and track listings ==
- US 7" vinyl single

A: "Thinking About You" – 5:24
B: "Someone for Me" – 4:58

- US 12" vinyl maxi single

A: "Thinking About You" (extended dance version) – 7:19
B1: "Thinking About You" (single version) – 4:03
B2: "Thinking About You" (dub version) – 8:04

- UK 12" vinyl single

A: "Thinking About You" (club side) – 5:24
B: "You Give Good Love" (radio side) – 4:33

== Credits and personnel ==
"Thinking About You"

- Kashif – writer, producer, uncredited vocals
- La Forrest Cope– writer
- Bruce Forest – remix producer
- Michael Hutchinson – engineer
- Whitney Houston, La La, and Meli'sa Morgan – background vocals

"Someone for Me"

- Freddie Washington – writer
- Raymond Jones – writer
- Jermaine Jackson – producer
- Bill Schnee – mixer

== Charts ==
Chart (1985)	Peak position
US Hot R&B/Hip-Hop Songs (Billboard)	10
US Dance Club Songs (Billboard) Remix	24
US Top 100 Black Contemporary Singles (Cashbox)	8

== Bibliography ==
- Cox, Ted (1997). Whitney Houston: Black Americans of Achievement. Chelsea House Publishers. ISBN 0-7910-4456-4.
