= La Forrest Cope =

American singer-songwriter

- Born: La Forrest Cope
- Origin: Queens, New York City, U.S.
- Genre: R&B
- Occupations: Singer, songwriter
- Years active: 1981–1992

La Forrest 'La La' Cope is an American singer and songwriter. She is best known for writing the hit song "You Give Good Love", recorded by Whitney Houston for her 1985 self-titled debut album, which went on to sell over 25 million units worldwide.

== Biography ==
La La was raised in the East Elmhurst neighborhood of Queens, New York City, United States. She took up the piano at the age of five and gave a piano recital at Carnegie Hall at the age of nine. After leaving New York's High School of Music and Art, she formed a band called Jack Sass, which played top 40 cover versions on the club scene. As the group's reputation grew, La La began introducing more of her own songs into the repertoire before she went to Juilliard to major in composition.

In 1981, she was invited to tour with Stacy Lattisaw who opened for the Jacksons on a national tour. Following this, she sang with the group Change, along with Luther Vandross, where her voice was heard on their song "The Glow of Love", co-written by her childhood friend from East Elmhurst, Queens, Wayne K. Garfield. She played one of her songs, "Stone Love", to another neighborhood friend, Kashif, who recorded it for his debut album in 1983.

=== Songwriting career ===
Throughout the 1980s, La La established herself as a songwriter, penning songs for many artists including Lillo Thomas ("All of You"), Melba Moore ("Living for Your Love" and "It's Really Love"), Glenn Jones ("Show Me" and "Stay"), Giorge Pettus ("My Night for Love") and a solo release, "Into the Night" which was featured on the Beat Street soundtrack album.

Through Kashif, she had a couple of her songs recorded by new Arista signing Whitney Houston ("You Give Good Love" and "Thinking About You") before signing to the label herself (both Kashif and Houston's label) as an artist. In 1987, she released her debut album La La, including duets with Glenn Jones and Bernard Wright and production by R&B group Full Force. She also duetted with Jermaine Jackson on a cover of Climie Fisher's "Rise to the Occasion" for his 1989 album Don't Take It Personal.

La La continued to write and produce for major artists including Carl Anderson and the top 10 US R&B hit "Secret Lady" for Stephanie Mills. After a move to Motown Records, she released her second (and last to date) solo album La La Means I Love You! in 1991, which included her version of her much-covered R&B classic "Show Me" as well as contributions from Rene Moore, Marcus Miller and Lenny White.

In 2024, La La was inducted into the Women Songwriters Hall of Fame.

== Discography ==
=== Albums ===
- La La (1987)
- La La Means I Love You! (1991)

=== Singles ===
Year	Song	US R&B
1984	"Into the Night"	—
1986	"(If You) Love Me Just a Little"	22
1987	"My Love Is on the Money"	48
1987	"I Got a Thing for You"	—
1987	"We'll Keep Striving"	—
1991	"A New Way of Love"	—
"—" denotes releases that did not chart.
