= You Give Good Love =

- US vinyl edition

Single by Whitney Houston

from the album Whitney Houston
- B-side: "Greatest Love of All"; "Someone for Me"; "Thinking About You"
- Released: February 22, 1985
- Recorded: 1983
- Genre: R&B; soul; quiet storm
- Length: 4:36
- Label: Arista
- Songwriter: La Forrest 'La La' Cope
- Producer: Kashif Saleem

Whitney Houston singles chronology
"Hold Me" (1984)	"You Give Good Love" (1985)	"All at Once" (1985)

Music video
- "You Give Good Love" on YouTube

"You Give Good Love" is the debut solo single by American singer Whitney Houston for her 1985 eponymous debut studio album. The song was written by La Forrest 'La La' Cope and produced by Kashif. Originally offered to Roberta Flack, it was one of the first songs recorded for Houston's debut album.

The song was released on February 22, 1985 as the album's leading single. The release of "You Give Good Love" was originally designed to give Houston a noticeable position and standing within the black music market first, eventually topping the US R&B singles charts on both Billboard and Cashbox.

The song was also an unexpected crossover pop hit, peaking at number three on the Billboard Hot 100 chart, Houston's first of what would be many Top 10 hits. It was later certified platinum by the Recording Industry Association of America (RIAA). The song also was successful in Canada, where it gave Houston her first top ten single there. In other countries such as the United Kingdom, Australia, New Zealand and Japan, its success in those countries were more moderate.

The song won Favorite Soul/R&B Single at the 13th American Music Awards and was nominated for Best R&B Song and Best Female R&B Vocal Performance at the 28th Annual Grammy Awards in 1986.

The music video for the song, directed by Michael Lindsay-Hogg, shows Houston performing at a club and a photographer focusing his camera on her.

Houston performed the song on various TV shows and awards ceremonies such as The Tonight Show Starring Johnny Carson, The 1985 R&B Countdown and The 1st Soul Train Music Awards of 1987, as well as on her first three tours and select dates of The Bodyguard World Tour (1993–94) and My Love Is Your Love World Tour (1999).

"You Give Good Love" is also featured on four of Houston's compilation albums, Whitney: The Greatest Hits (2000), Love, Whitney (2001), The Essential Whitney Houston (2011) and I Will Always Love You: The Best of Whitney Houston (2012).

== Background ==
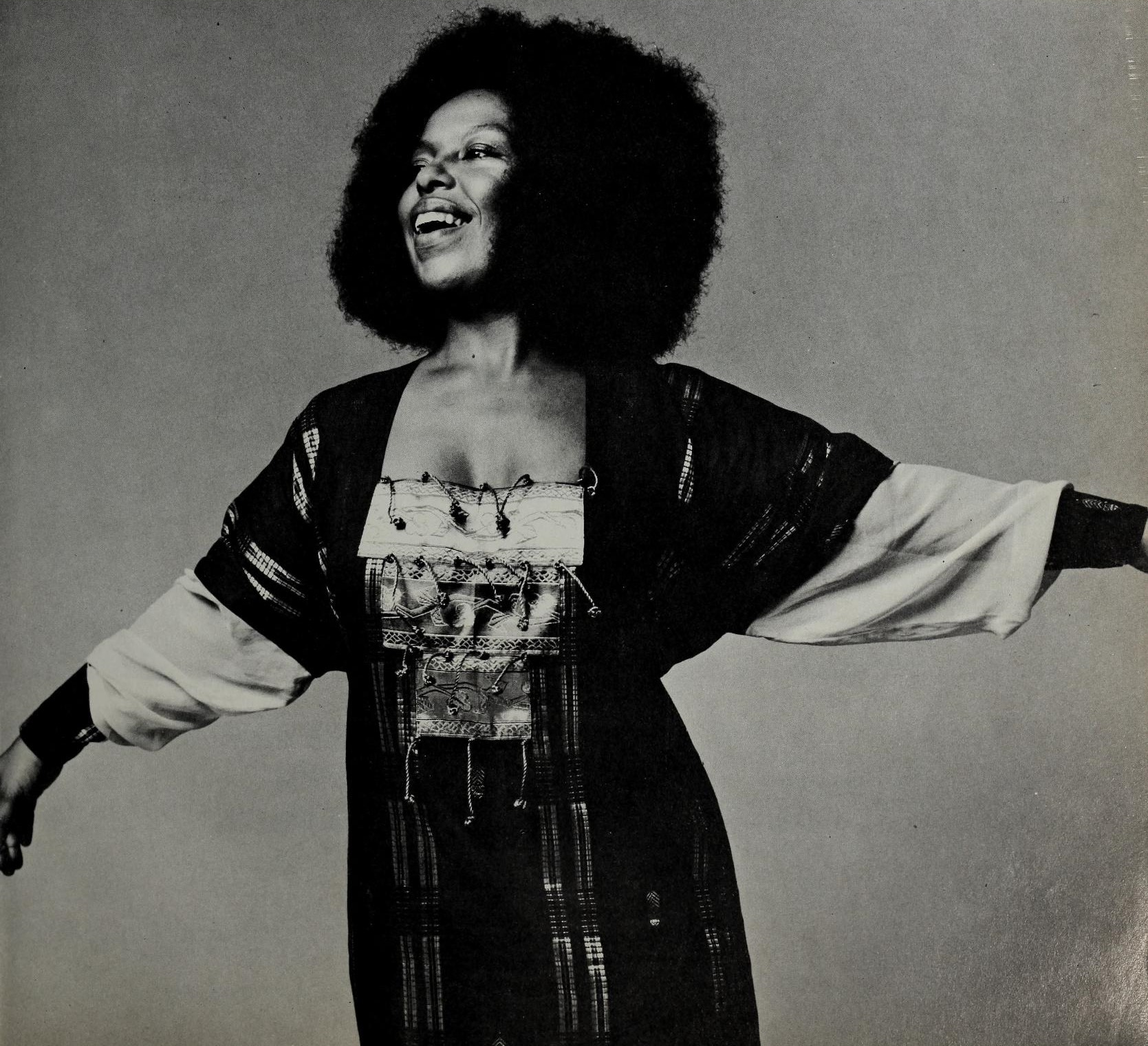
"You Give Good Love" was originally written with Roberta Flack in mind.

Born in Newark, New Jersey and later raised in East Orange, New Jersey, Whitney Houston was the youngest child of gospel and rhythm and blues singer Cissy Houston. By her teen years, Houston was leading the junior church choir at Newark's New Hope Baptist Church and doing background session work for artists such as Chaka Khan and Lou Rawls among others.

After hiring Tara Productions founders Eugene Harvey and Seymour Flics to manage her professional career in 1981, Houston began seeking a record deal, auditioning for the record labels Elektra and Epic Records in 1982. Following guest appearances on albums by Material and Paul Jabara, Houston signed an exclusive contract with Clive Davis' Arista label in April 1983.

To pique producers' interest in giving the singer songs to record, Houston, Davis and Arista A&R Gerry Griffith presented showcases in both New York and Los Angeles nightclubs. One of the producers, Kashif, who was also signed to Arista, accepted Davis' invitation to see Houston's New York club performance.

Kashif admitted disappointment in viewing the singer's show, comparing it to a "lounge act", admitting he wasn't used to producing "cabaret singers". Undeterred, Davis sent Kashif a videotaped clip of Houston's performance of "Home" from The Wiz on The Merv Griffin Show, to which Kashif was impressed by. (Note: In the interview posted, Kashif mistook The Merv Griffin Show for The Mike Douglas Show and that Whitney sang "Over the Rainbow" rather than "Home".) Around this time, a songwriter who had just got signed to Kashif's music publishing company named La Forrest 'La La' Cope, a fellow musician and then attending Juilliard School, sent him a demo of a ballad she had written titled "You Give Good Love".

A demo tape of the song had been initially sent to Cope's idol, soul singer Roberta Flack, who she explained, had "expressed familiarity with her work" and wanted the songwriter to pen a song for her after the two met during Flack's tour with Kashif as her opening act. Cope penned two other songs during this period - "Livin' for Your Love" and "Show Me", which would be recorded that same year by artists Melba Moore and Glenn Jones respectively. Both songs became R&B hits, peaking in the top ten on the R&B chart in 1984.

Cope sent a demo tape of the song to Flack after she wrote in the middle of her writing an assignment from Julliard. The songwriter was reportedly sick and under the weather when she brought her tape to the Dakota apartment Flack was staying at in Manhattan. When she called Flack's office to receive word about the demo, the songwriter was rebuffed by Flack's assistant with an angry "don't call us, we'll call you" retort, leaving Cope upset. After Kashif heard the song at his apartment in New York City, a light bulb came out in his mind that flashed "hit! hit!" Kashif then advised Cope to rewrite the song for Houston and "make it a double entendre".

== Recording and composition ==
Kashif called Griffith after hearing Cope's demo and told him, "I think I have a song for you" and invited Griffith and Houston to the New Jersey studio where he worked at to listen to the song. Griffith recalled that there was a demo but Cope wanted to sing it live with her piano playing. In an interview with Billboard, Cope mentioned as she was finishing the song, "[Houston] picked up on the lyrics and was singing it along with me," to Cope's astonishment.

Afterwards, Griffith remarked "'that's the song – that's what I've been looking for.' It was the kind of tune that had the emotion that she could get into and sing her heart out." Houston immediately loved it and, according to Kashif, recorded the song immediately after Cope performed it, stunning Cope, Kashif and Griffith, who claims Houston recorded it in a single take.

The song included Bashiri Johnson on percussion, J. T. Lewis on drums, and Ira Siegel on rhythm guitar, Kashif himself programmed synthesized instruments including a bass marimba that opens the song, while Houston, Cope and Yogi Lee sang background vocals. According to the sheet music provided by Universal Music Publishing, "You Give Good Love" is an R&B song with the tempo of "moderately" under 76 beats per minute.

The song is known for shifting to higher keys throughout the verses, starting in the key of E major throughout the beginning and most of the first verse before moving up to G major for the first bridge, first chorus and the second verse, before then moving up to B♭ in the repeat of the bridge, which by then Houston, who had softly crooned the song up until that point, belted the song and would continue to do so throughout the song until the end. Houston's vocal range in the song spans from B_{3} to G_{5} while the instrumental range on Kashif's keyboard arrangement spans from C_{2} to B♭_{5}

== Release ==
Arista released "You Give Good Love" as the official leading single from Houston's self-titled debut album on February 22, 1985, over a week after the album itself was released on Valentine's Day 1985. Despite having charted the previous year with soul singer Teddy Pendergrass on the adult contemporary ballad "Hold Me", which reached the top ten on both the R&B and adult contemporary charts, Houston was still relatively unknown at the time of the release of "You Give Good Love".

At the time, the music industry was under a "musical re-segregation" where songs by popular artists were split between top 40, R&B, AC and rock genre radio stations following the sociopolitical backlash of the disco era in the late 1970s and early 1980s. In the early '80s, music editors for the industry magazines Cashbox and Billboard changed their official R&B charts from "soul" to "black", with Billboard journalist Nelson George explaining in the latter publication's June 26, 1982 issue that year that the name change was based on the fact that "blacks [sic] have been making and buying pop music of greater stylistic variety than the soul sound since the early 1970s", noting most black artists were recording under various genres outside of what was considered "soul" music. By that period, very few black artists were given play on pop radio. At the same time, black artists who did eventually cross over to pop radio, such as Lionel Richie, Prince and Michael Jackson recorded music directly aimed at white audiences.

Black female artists had an even harder time to cross over to pop stations, with only Diana Ross, Dionne Warwick, Donna Summer, Chaka Khan and Deniece Williams having intermittent success on top 40 radio. Arista had struggled with breaking new black female talent in the past with artists such as Phyllis Hyman and Angela Bofill, both of whom failed to score a top 40 hit and were reluctant to cross over, in fear of abandoning their predominantly black audiences.

According to CBC.ca, Clive Davis had a vision for Arista: he "wanted a pop star whose career he could steer, a singer who would be embraced by households around the world." In his 1974 memoir Clive: Inside the Record Business, Davis wrote: "an artist can be extremely gifted and yet remain unsuccessful if he or she records the wrong music, or gets an image that confuses potential audiences."

The release of "You Give Good Love" was designed to give Houston a noticeable position and standing within the R&B markets. Davis later explained the thinking behind releasing the song as the debut single from the album:

"We wanted to establish her in the black marketplace first, otherwise you can fall between cracks, where Top 40 won't play you and R&B won't consider you their own. We felt that 'You Give Good Love' would be, at the very least, a major black hit, though we didn't think that it would cross over as strongly as it did. When it did cross over with such velocity that gave us great encouragement."

== Chart performance ==
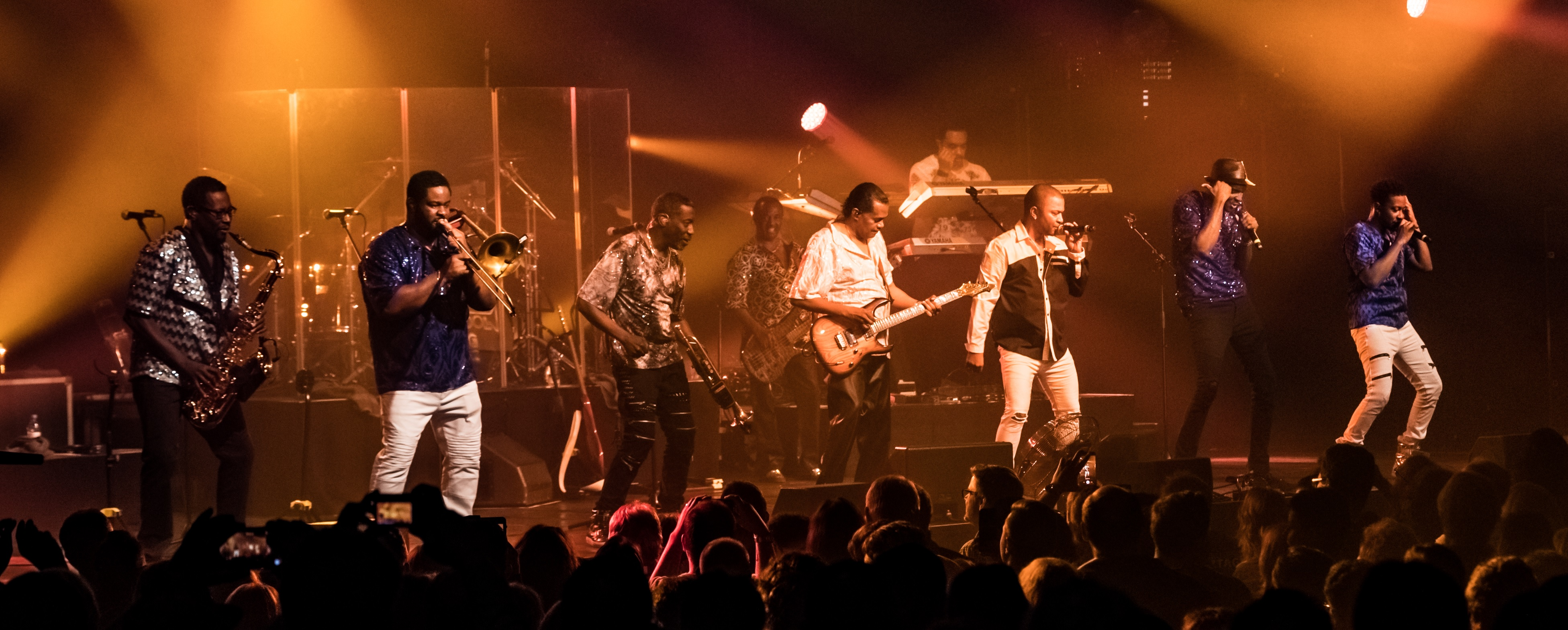
"You Give Good Love" replaced "Fresh" by Kool & the Gang (pictured in 2017) at number one on the Billboard Hot Black Singles chart.

"You Give Good Love" entered the Billboard Hot Black Singles chart at number 89 on the March 9 issue, and on the ninth week of its release, reached the top ten of the chart, the issue dated May 4, 1985. Eventually, it hit the pole position of the chart, the issue date of May 25, 1985, replacing Kool & the Gang's "Fresh" off the top spot, and stayed atop for one week, becoming Houston's first R&B number-one single.

On the May 11, 1985 issue of Billboard, the song debuted simultaneously on the Billboard Hot 100 and Hot Adult Contemporary charts at numbers 67 and 40 respectively.

Four weeks later, on the June 1st issue, the song gave Houston her first top 40 entry, rising to number 34. It gradually rose up the charts, becoming Houston's first top ten entry at number 7 for the week of July 6. On July 27, it reached its peak of number three on the chart, a position it would remain for three consecutive weeks afterwards, eventually spending a cumulative total of 21 weeks on the chart, including 12 weeks in the top 40 and six weeks in the top ten.

On the Adult Contemporary chart, it reached a peak of number four in the July 20, 1985 issue, becoming her second top ten entry and first solo top ten AC hit. It would spend 21 weeks on the chart. The song marked the first time Houston reached the top ten with the same song on three different main Billboard charts.

On the US Cashbox charts, the song repeated its Billboard success peaking at number one on the Cashbox Black Contemporary Singles chart for the week of June 1, 1985 and number three on the Top 100 Singles chart on August 3, 1985.

In Canada, the song debuted at number 95 on the RPM 100 Singles chart on the May 18 issue, and 15 weeks later peaked at number seven on the chart, the issue date of August 31, 1985, becoming Houston's first top ten hit in the country. It placed at number 76 on the RPM year-end Top 100 Singles chart of 1985.

Worldwide, "You Give Good Love" was not released as a single except in a few countries such as Australia, Japan, New Zealand and the United Kingdom. Unlike in North America, the song did not receive enough attention to establish itself as a hit song in these markets, because other songs from Houston's debut album ―"All at Once" and "Saving All My Love for You" ― got a better reaction from the public and the media, particularly in Europe. The early promotion for the album was also strategically focused on these songs.

The single entered, but did not reach the Top 40 of, the singles charts of several of these countries: it peaked at number 58 in Australia, 44 in New Zealand, and 93 in the UK, becoming her first UK singles chart entry on August 24, 1985.

== Critical reception ==
Billboard, in its review of the single, called Houston's vocal on the song as "a voice of exceptional clarity and control." Adam White, a performance reviewer of Billboard, in his writing of Houston's performance to promote her debut album at the Sweetwater's in New York, described the song as "the mellifluous, midtempo item." Fellow Billboard critic Brian Chin commented that "the ecstatic single which may possibly be the classiest make-out song since 'Fire and Desire'." While reviewing Houston's I Look to You album, Rashod D. Ollison from TheGrio stated that "You Give Good Love" is "effortlessly sexy."

== Accolades ==
The song received a number of awards and nominations following its release. "You Give Good Love" won Favorite Soul/R&B Single at the 13th American Music Awards, where Houston garnered a total of six nominations in Pop/Rock and Soul/R&B categories, on January 27, 1986.

The song received two Grammy nominations―Best R&B Song and Best R&B Vocal Performance, Female―but lost to "Freeway of Love" written by Jeffrey Cohen and Narada Michael Walden, performed by Aretha Franklin in both categories, at the 28th Annual Grammy Awards, held on February 25, 1986.

The song was ranked number 47, number 27 and number two on the Billboard Year-End Top Pop Singles, Top Adult Contemporary Singles and Top Black Singles charts, respectively. On the Cashbox year-end pop and black singles lists, the song was ranked the 25th and 4th biggest single respectively on the lists.

On December 6, 1995, a decade after its release, the single was certified gold by the Recording Industry Association of America (RIAA) for pure sales of half a million copies in the United States alone. On March 3, 2020, on the song's 35th anniversary of its original release, the ballad was re-certified platinum for stream and sales equivalent units of a million copies.

== Controversy ==
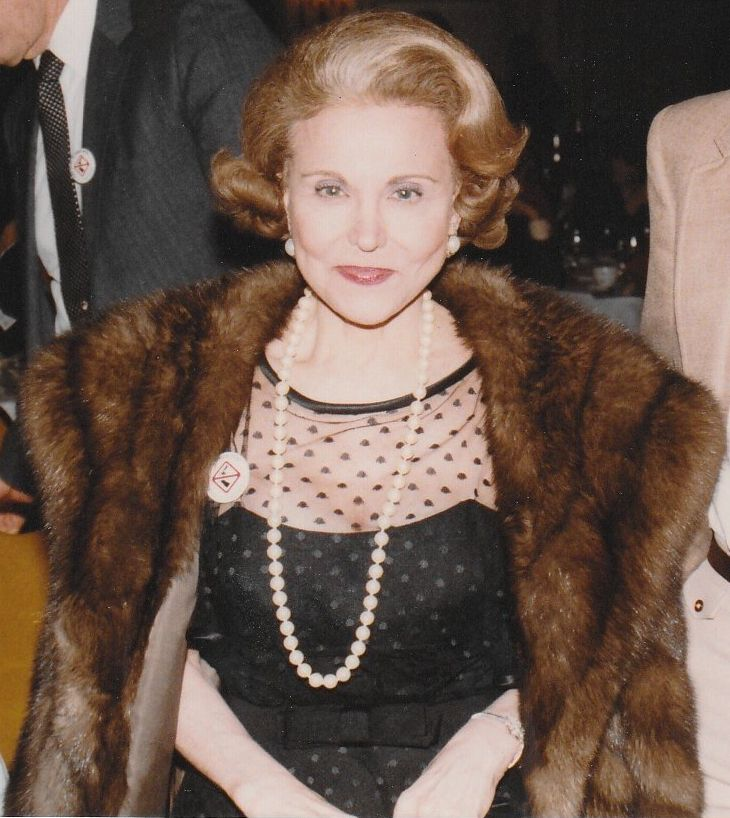
Ann Landers, the pseudonym for Ruth Crowley (pictured in 1983), criticized the song for having "trashy lyrics".

"You Give Good Love" brought Houston a bit of notoriety when it turned up among several songs cited by advice columnist Ann Landers as having suggestive titles. Landers, in her column for a reader who worried about the bad influence of song lyrics on children, wrote that "Some of the lyrics are sexually provocative. The titles tell the story," and called the song "pretty trashy stuff", citing the song's title as an instance along with "Hot Love" by Cheap Trick, "Let's Go to Bed" by The Cure, "Ready, Willing and Able" by Lita Ford, "You Shook Me All Night Long" and "Love at First Feel" by AC/DC, "Tease Me" by Junie Morrison and "Fire Down Below" by Bob Seger.

Houston, in an interview with the Chicago Tribune, gave some answers to Landers' comments, saying "She chose a few songs out of the Top 40 that she thought had suggestive titles as far as she was concerned, and it was one of them. I don't think that the title is suggestive at all. It didn't say anything but 'you give good love,' and it didn't say anything in the song that was sexual or outrageous. I think that Miss Landers just looked at the title and didn't view the song itself."

Houston, who described herself as a religious person, said that she hasn't given much thought to the controversy over questionable lyrics:

"The songs that I sing don't fall into that category, so I don't think about it at all. But I believe that music does influence people. It's a universal thing. Everybody listens to music and knows about it. I think that the lyrics can have a lot to do with influencing whoever you're singing to. I think that as far as children are concerned, parents should have control over what they listen to. If they don't want them to listen to records that are very sexual or explicit or outrageous, they should have control over that situation. As for adults, they're going to buy whatever kind of music they want to hear, so if they buy music with explicit lyrics, they must like it."

== Music video ==
Houston in the music video for "You Give Good Love", tells the story of a romance with a cameraman.

The music video for "You Give Good Love" was directed by Michael Lindsay-Hogg and produced by Karen Bellone, featured an off-duty cameraman entering a club that's being refurbished. Houston is on the stage rehearsing for a performance. Taken aback by her impressive singing, the man begins filming Houston as she performs. As the performance continued, the nightclub's cooks come out and begins dancing along to the song before the cameraman pans away from Houston, ending the video.

Time commented that the video "tells the story of a romance with a cameraman ― and, more tellingly, with his adoring camera." Liam Lacey of The Globe and Mail, in an interview with Houston, called it "the blatantly erotic video" and added "Houston and a photographer have a suggestive encounter (the photographer with his zoom lens, the singer with her microphone)."

Robyn Crawford, Houston's best friend and personal assistant, makes an appearance as one of the backing singers. Kenneth Reynolds, then president of public relations for Arista, played one of the cooks in the video. The video was uploaded on Houston's official YouTube channel in November 2012 and has since amassed 43 million views.

== Live performances ==
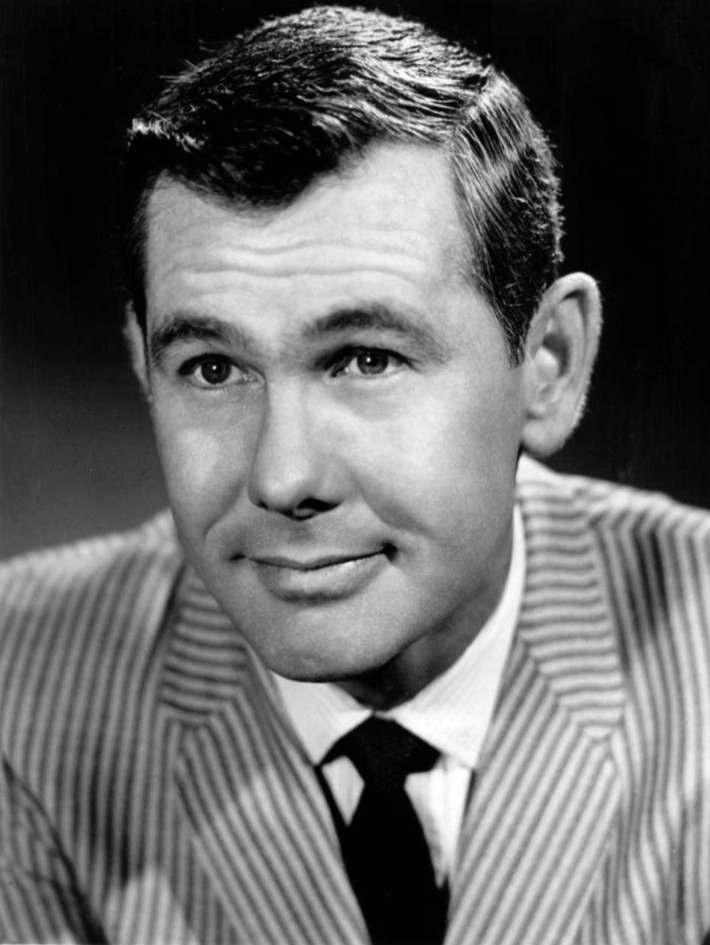
Houston's appearance on Johnny Carson's The Tonight Show Starring Johnny Carson was a breakthrough for rising black talent to get on late night talk shows.

As a solo artist, Houston first promoted "You Give Good Love" alongside other tunes from her debut album Whitney Houston in the shows, arranged by Clive Davis for music critics to see Houston perform, at Sweetwater's club in New York, the place where Cissy Houston had been bringing Houston along, on February 12–16, 1985.

She also performed the song on The Tonight Show Starring Johnny Carson on April 5, 1985, which was her first national TV performance since The Merv Griffin Show in 1983. At the time of Houston's appearance, few emerging black artists were allowed performances on late-night talk shows, which made Houston's performance a breakthrough moment for black performers. This performance was included in the 2014 CD/DVD release, Whitney Houston Live: Her Greatest Performances. On April 20, Houston performed the song on Soul Train. On April 29, she performed the song on The Merv Griffin Show. She also performed the song along with "Saving All My Love for You" on the syndicated TV special The 1985 R&B Countdown which aired on December 31, 1985.

She delivered a performance of "You Give Good Love" on the 1st Soul Train Music Awards, where Houston was nominated for two categories, at the Santa Monica Civic Auditorium on March 23, 1987. The performance is found in the bonus DVD featured on Whitney Houston: The Deluxe Anniversary Edition, remastered to celebrate the 25th anniversary of its original release.

In addition to her numerous performances for the song in TV shows as well as award ceremonies, the song was included in setlist on Houston's first three tours, Greatest Love Tour (1986), Moment of Truth World Tour (1987–88) and Feels So Right Japan Tour (1990). Additionally, the song was performed on select dates of her The Bodyguard World Tour (1993–94) and My Love Is Your Love World Tour (1999). Among her tour performances of the song, the Yokohama Arena live footage on January 7, 1990, was taped and later broadcast on Japanese TV.

=== Live cover versions ===
Monica performed "You Give Good Love" as part of a tribute to Houston, the recipient of the Quincy Jones Award in that year, along with Ronald Isley, Terry Ellis and Kenny Lattimore at the 12th Soul Train Music Awards held on February 27, 1998. Jennifer Hudson covered the song as one of the setlist during her first US tour, Jennifer Hudson & Robin Thicke in Concert, in April – May, 2009. Karen Rodriguez, one of Top 13 finalists on the tenth season of American Idol, auditioned on MySpace first and then in front of the judges in Los Angeles with the song in 2010. Not too long after Houston's death in February 2012, Monica and Brandy gave a concert paying tribute to Houston in Los Angeles performing the song acapella.

== Legacy and influence ==
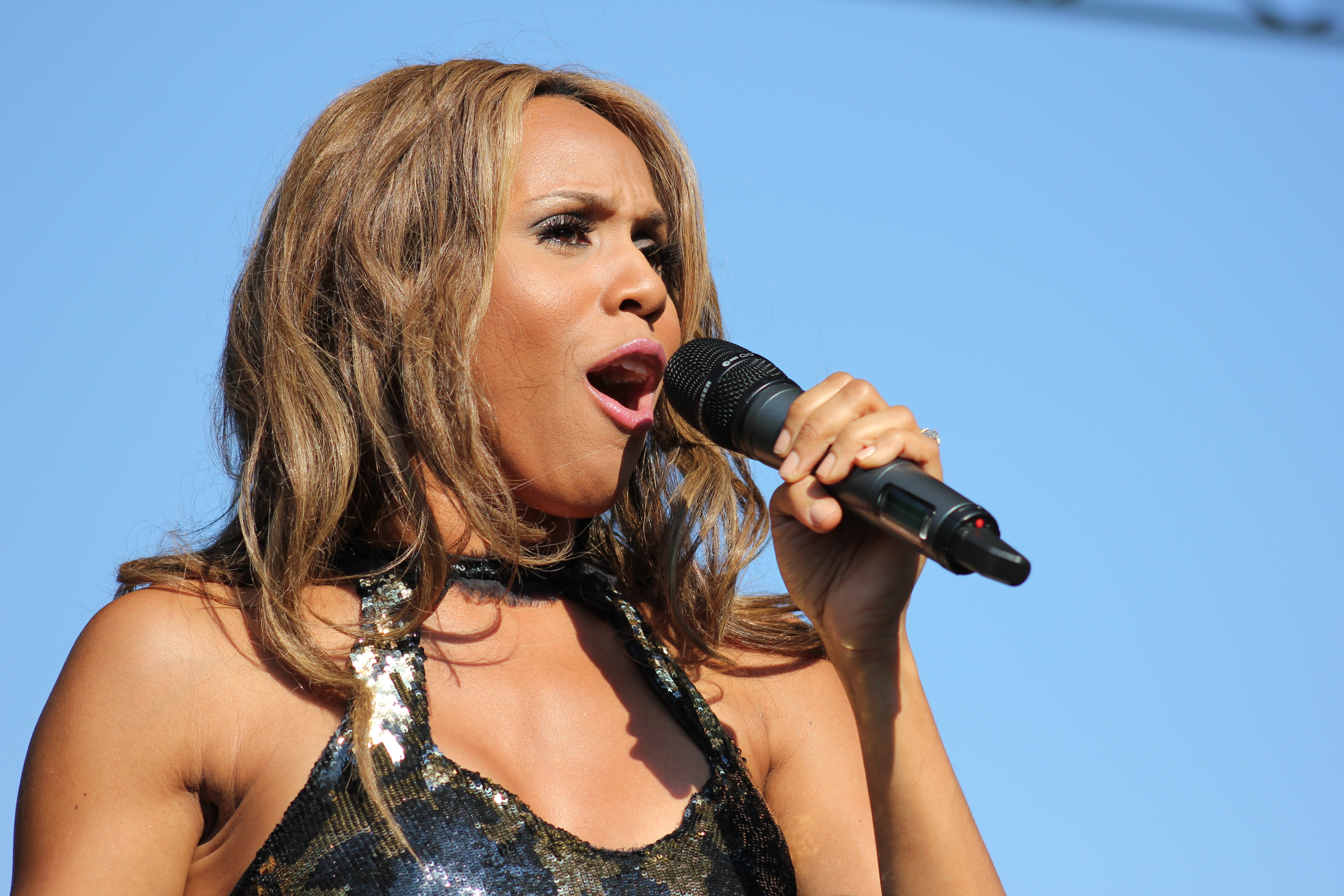
Deborah Cox was heavily influenced to be a singer following the release of Houston's "You Give Good Love".

The ballad has been covered and sampled numerous times over the years, according to WhoSampled. Artists who have covered the song include the Hindley Street Country Club, Demetria McKinney and LaKisha Jones. Artists who have sampled "You Give Good Love" include The Game, Rapsody, Tracey Lee and 9th Wonder.

The song influenced many black female artists, most notably Canadian R&B singer Deborah Cox, who stated that Houston singing the ballad "stopped me dead in my tracks. I had to know who that was singing. There weren't any Black artists really being played on Canadian radio at the time. We're talking about the late '80s and it was just like... 'who is that?!'"

Cox, who would later record on Houston's label Arista and with whom she recorded the hit R&B duet ballad, "Same Script, Different Cast" many years later for Houston's 2000 compilation Whitney: The Greatest Hits, added that the song and Houston "made a huge impact on me because her voice was just so pure and soulful and it was not like anything that I had heard on the radio", comparing Houston's vocal style to that of Aretha Franklin and Gladys Knight, adding "no one sounded like Whitney."

In March 2026, 31-year-old The Voice season 29 contestant and eventual winner Alexia Jayy performed the song in front of the show's judges, with Jayy's vocals being compared to Houston's and fellow artist Lauryn Hill and Kelly Clarkson telling Jayy "you are literally so good. It's like if Whitney Houston and Lauryn Hill had a baby".

Following the song's breakthrough to pop radio, Cashbox wrote in their June 1, 1985 issue that Houston was "proving that the pop marketplace is open up to black product." The song ranked #10 on Entertainment Weekly's 25 best Whitney Houston songs, writing about the song's crossover success, stating "this pretty bedroom ballad — the first big single from her debut album — proved that soulful R&B and top 40 pop can be hard to tell apart when the lights are off." In 2009, the song was named the 12th greatest slow jam of all time by Essence magazine.

On November 6, 2020, the day before Houston was inducted into the Rock and Roll Hall of Fame, Billboard ranked the song 21st in their 25 best Whitney Houston songs ever list, writing that the song "[was] an exemplar of mid-’80s balladry, with light synths and a gentle, easy groove providing the bedrock for Houston to show off just an ounce of her firm, confident vocal prowess." In his list of 12 favorite Houston songs, Rob Sheffield of Rolling Stone placed the ballad on his list, stating the song "introduc[ed] the world to Whitney Houston, a great pop singer with the voice of a great soul singer."

In 2022, the network BET ranked the slow jam the 15th best Whitney Houston song out of 40 songs, acknowledging the song's unexpected crossover success with white pop audiences, stating "her irrepressible vocal abilities — effortlessly switching between husky, from-the-gut tones to soft soprano trills — made this breezy song an unexpected crossover hit, peaking at No. 3 on the Billboard Hot 100, a major feat for an unknown Black artist in the mid-'80s".

Forbes ranked the song as the 11th best Houston song out of 20, writing that the song "instantly made Houston a bona fide superstar, one who challenged the palettes of music lovers and the general public fell in love with," adding that "this song’s place in Houston’s discography is essential because it was the beginning of what would become an epochal career." The Guardian ranked it the 20th greatest Whitney Houston song in their greatest Houston songs list.

Justin Kantor of the Seattle Post-Intelligencer credited the pop radio success of "You Give Good Love" with "open[ing] the floodgates for big-voiced female R&B singers in the 'crossover' market of the 1980's and '90s." The song's producer Kashif added in the same article, "[You Give Good Love] took my career to a whole new level and helped to cement my status as an elite producer. For that I am eternally grateful to Whitney."

== Formats and track listings ==
- UK, AUS 12" vinyl maxi single
  - A "You Give Good Love" (extended version) – 4:55
  - B1 "Someone for Me"
  - B2 "Thinking About You"
- AUS, Japan 7" vinyl single
  - A "You Give Good Love" – 4:33
  - B "Greatest Love of All" – 4:55
- UK, 7" vinyl single
  - A "You Give Good Love"
  - B "Thinking About You"
- US, 7" vinyl single
  - A "You Give Good Love" – 3:58
  - B "Greatest Love of All" – 4:55

== Credits and personnel ==
Credits adapted from the album Whitney Houston liner notes.

- Whitney Houston – lead vocals, vocal arrangements
- J. T. Lewis – drums
- Yogi Lee – background vocals
- Ira Siegel – guitar
- Bashiri Johnson – percussion
- Michael O'Reilly – mixing, engineer
- Kashif – arrangements, producer

== Charts ==
=== Weekly charts ===
Chart (1985)	Peak position
Australia (Kent Music Report)	58
Canada Top Singles (RPM)	7
Canada (The Record)	17
Canada Adult Contemporary (RPM)	18
New Zealand (Recorded Music NZ)	44
Quebec (ADISQ)	27
UK Singles (Official Charts)	93
US Billboard Hot 100	3
US Adult Contemporary (Billboard)	4
US Hot Black Singles (Billboard)	1
US Cash Box Top 100	3
US Top 100 Black Contemporary Singles (Cash Box)	1
US Radio & Records CHR/Pop Airplay Chart	4

Chart (2012)	Peak position
South Korea International (Gaon)	134
US R&B/Hip-Hop Digital Songs (Billboard)	31

=== Year-end charts ===
Chart (1985)	Position
Canada Top Singles (RPM)	76
US Billboard Hot 100	47
US Adult Contemporary (Billboard)	27
US Hot Black Singles (Billboard)	2
US Cash Box Top 100	25
US Top 100 Black Contemporary Singles (Cash Box)	4

== Certifications ==
Region	Certification	Certified units/sales
United States (RIAA)	Platinum	1,000,000^{‡}
^{‡} Sales+streaming figures based on certification alone.

== See also ==
- List of number-one R&B singles of 1985 (U.S.)
- Grammy Award for Best Female R&B Vocal Performance

== Bibliography ==
- Seal, Richard (1994), Whitney Houston: One Moment in Time, Britannia Press Publishing, ISBN 0-9519937-8-X
- Bronson, Fred; White, Adam (1993), The Billboard Book of Number One Rhythm and Blues Hits, Billboard Books, ISBN 0-8230828-5-7
