= Whitney Houston singles discography =

Singles by American singer

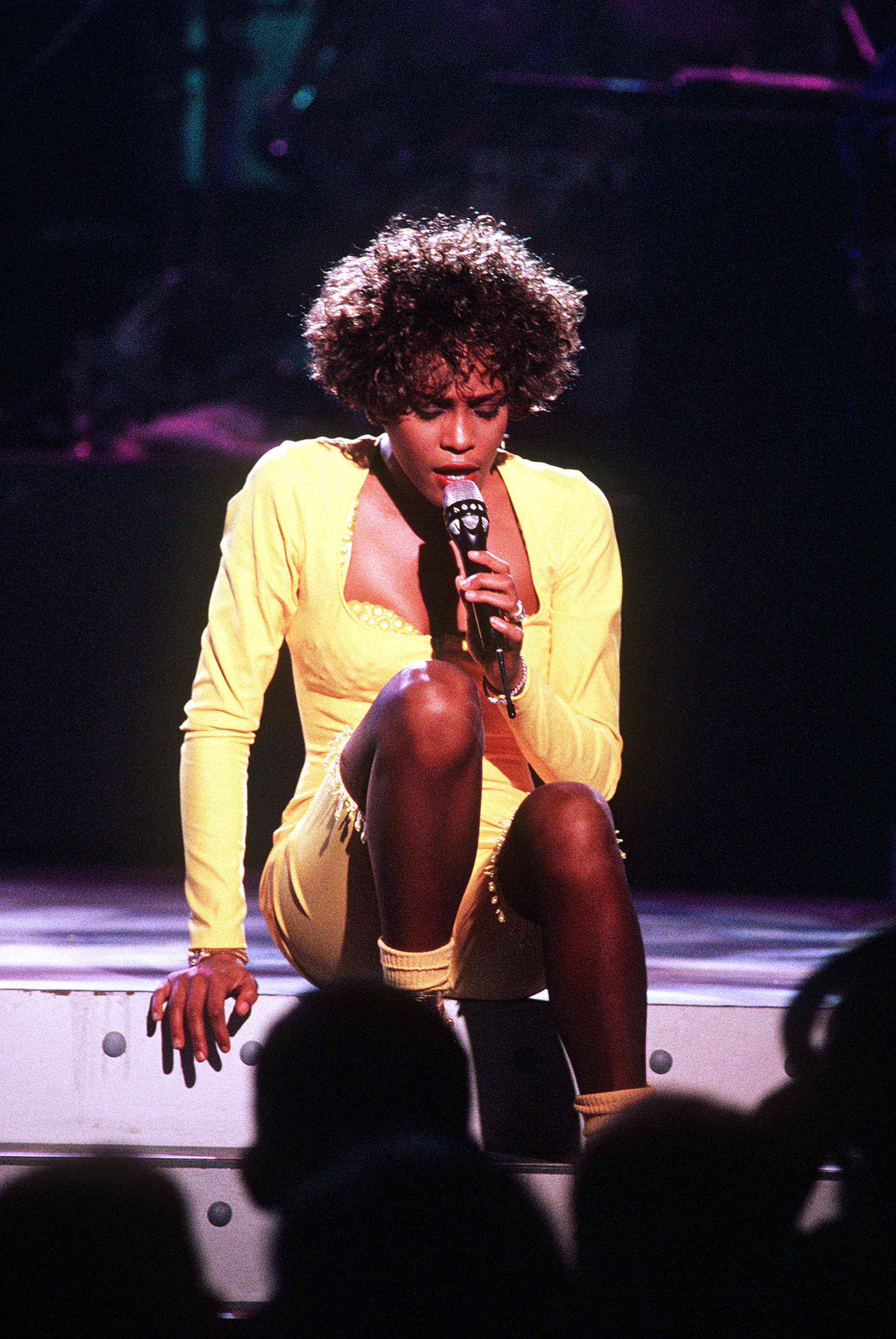
- Houston performing at Welcome Home Heroes with Whitney Houston in 1991
- As lead artist: 60
- As featured artist: 4
- Other appearances: 10
- Promotional or limited release: 18

American singer Whitney Houston released 60 singles as a leading artist and 18 promotional singles and was either a featured artist or guest appeared in 14 other songs. Known as “The Voice”, she is one of the most significant cultural icons of the 20th century. According to Billboard, Houston is the ninth most successful solo artist in US chart history. Houston has sold over 110 million singles worldwide, and has accumulated 11 Billboard Hot 100 number-one singles (fifth most by a solo female artist and sixth overall) and was one of the very few artists to enter the top ten on the Billboard Hot 100 in four different decades. Houston sold the most physical singles in the United States with 16.5 million units. To date, Houston has amassed over 54 million RIAA-certified units in the country. Houston has sold 17.5 million singles in the United Kingdom alone and according to the Official Charts Company in 2012, was the fourth best-selling female singles artist of all time. Between 1985 and 2019, Houston scored 32 top ten singles in at least one official record chart in the biggest music markets in the world.

Following her chart debut in "Hold Me" (1984), a duet with Teddy Pendergrass, Houston's first leading single off her self-titled debut, "You Give Good Love" (1985) became her first top-ten hit on the Billboard Hot 100 while "Saving All My Love for You" became her first number-one single on the same chart. With "How Will I Know" and "Greatest Love of All" peaking at number one, Houston became the first female artist to have three singles off the same album reach number one on the Billboard Hot 100. Houston continued to reach number one on the Billboard Hot 100 following the release of her second effort, Whitney in 1987, the album's lead single, "I Wanna Dance With Somebody (Who Loves Me)," reached global acclaim, selling over 18 million copies worldwide, becoming the best-selling single of the 1980s by a female artist, the best-selling single worldwide in 1987, Houston's best selling digital single, and one of the best-selling singles of all time. The album's next three singles, "Didn't We Almost Have It All", "So Emotional" and "Where Do Broken Hearts Go", all peaked at number-one on the Billboard Hot 100, making it the first album by a woman to have four singles off the same album reach number one on the Billboard Hot 100. Houston became the first and only artist to produce seven consecutive number-one singles on the Billboard Hot 100, a record that has yet to be broken.

After scoring an international Olympics hit "One Moment in Time", Houston continued to record hits in the 1990s. "I'm Your Baby Tonight" and "All the Man That I Need", from the I'm Your Baby Tonight (1990) album, made Houston the first solo female artist to have multiple songs off three albums to reach number one on the Billboard Hot 100. Houston's rendition of "The Star Spangled Banner" (1991), recorded at Super Bowl XXV, became the first version of the national anthem to reach the top twenty of the Billboard Hot 100. The same song peaked in the top ten of the same chart ten years later. "I Will Always Love You" (1992), from The Bodyguard soundtrack, became the biggest hit of Houston's recording career, reaching number one for 14 weeks on the Billboard Hot 100. It still holds the record for the longest consecutive run at number one by a female artist. Topping the charts in 34 countries and selling 24 million global units, it's the best-selling physical single by a woman in music history and went diamond in the United States. The album's follow-ups, "I'm Every Woman" and "I Have Nothing", each entered the top-ten of the Billboard Hot 100. In March 1993, all three entered the top eleven of the Billboard Hot 100 simultaneously, the first for an artist since SoundScan began tallying record sales in 1991.

Houston continued to record hit singles for the duration of her career, entering number one on the Billboard Hot 100 with "Exhale" (1995), just the third time a single had done so. Houston produced international hits with "Step by Step" (1996), "When You Believe" (1998), "It's Not Right but It's Okay" (1999), "My Love Is Your Love" (1999), "Could I Have This Kiss Forever" (2000) and "Million Dollar Bill" (2009). Following her death in 2012, Houston re-entered various record charts worldwide, with "I Will Always Love You" reaching number three on the Billboard Hot 100. Houston returned to various charts with her multi-platinum rendition of "Higher Love" (2019), which became her 40th chart hit on the Billboard Hot 100 and charted successfully all over the world. Houston is one of the few artists to have a number one single on a Billboard chart in five decades.

== Singles ==
=== 1980s ===
List of singles, with selected chart positions
Title	Year	Peak chart positions										Certifications	Sales	Album
Title	Year	US	AUS	AUT	CAN	GER	IRE	NLD	SWE	SWI	UK	Certifications	Sales	Album
"Hold Me" (Note: "Hold Me" was originally released as a single from Teddy Pendergrass' album, Love Language, in the United States and some European countries such as Germany and the UK in 1984. In the following year, the song was included on Houston's debut album and charted in the Netherlands and the UK in early 1986.) (with Teddy Pendergrass)	1984	46	—	—	—	―	25	22	—	—	44			Love Language and Whitney Houston
"You Give Good Love"	1985	3	58	—	7	—	—	―	—	—	93	RIAA: Platinum		Whitney Houston
"All at Once" (Note: While "All at Once" was never released as an official single in the US except as a B-side of "Saving All My Love for You", the song was strategically selected as the lead single from her debut album in Benelux countries and Germany in early 1985, aiming for the adult-oriented market. In Italy, the song was popular after Houston's performance of the song during the 1987 Sanremo Music Festival, and then was released as a commercial vinyl single including "Hold Me" in the same year. In Japan, it was released as a 3-inch snap pack single by BMG Victor on July 26, 1996, and peaked at number 42 at the Japanese Singles Chart in that year.)	1985	—	—	—	—	—	—	5	—	—	—			Whitney Houston
"Saving All My Love for You"	1985	1	20	12	8	18	1	12	—	5	1	RIAA: 2× Platinum; BPI: Gold	UK: 740,000	Whitney Houston
"Thinking About You" (Note: "Thinking About You" was released as a 12-inch vinyl single featuring its extended dance version in the US in October 1985, and also issued as a standard 45, but because it was only promoted to R&B radio, not pop radio, it never appeared on the Hot 100.)	1985	—	—	—	—	—	—	—	—	―	—			Whitney Houston
"How Will I Know"	1985	1	2	28	1	26	3	15	2	11	5	RIAA: 3× Platinum; BPI: 2× Platinum; BVMI: Gold; MC: Platinum		Whitney Houston
"Greatest Love of All"	1986	1	1	25	1	30	4	17	14	20	8	RIAA: 2× Platinum; BPI: Platinum; MC: Platinum		Whitney Houston
"I Wanna Dance with Somebody (Who Loves Me)"	1987	1	1	3	1	1	2	1	1	1	1	RIAA: 9× Platinum; ARIA: 8× Platinum; BPI: 5× Platinum; BVMI: Platinum; GLF: Gold; MC: Gold; NVPI: Gold	World: 18,000,000	Whitney
"Didn't We Almost Have It All"	1987	1	27	—	2	20	4	20	—	18	14	RIAA: Gold; BPI: Silver		Whitney
"So Emotional"	1987	1	26	—	9	—	3	23	—	30	5	RIAA: Platinum	UK: 215,000	Whitney
"Where Do Broken Hearts Go"	1988	1	48	—	6	—	2	47	—	—	14	RIAA: Gold; BPI: Silver		Whitney
"Love Will Save the Day"	1988	9	84	—	8	37	8	6	—	18	10			Whitney
"One Moment in Time"	1988	5	53	5	4	1	2	6	3	4	1	RIAA: Gold; BPI: Gold; BVMI: Gold; SNEP: Silver	UK: 326,000	1988 Summer Olympics Album: One Moment in Time
"I Know Him So Well" (Note: "I Know Him So Well" was only released as a single in Australia, Germany, the Netherlands and Spain in late 1988.) (with Cissy Houston)	1988	—	—	—	—	46	—	14	—	—	—			Whitney
"—" denotes a release that did not chart or was not released as a single in that territory

=== 1990s ===
List of singles, with selected chart positions
Title	Year	Peak chart positions										Certifications	Sales	Album
Title	Year	US	AUS	AUT	CAN	GER	IRE	NLD	SWE	SWI	UK	Certifications	Sales	Album
"I'm Your Baby Tonight"	1990	1	7	3	2	5	6	2	4	4	5	RIAA: Platinum; GLF: Gold; BPI: Silver	UK: 175,000	I'm Your Baby Tonight
"All the Man That I Need"	1990	1	59	21	1	37	16	9	―	28	13	RIAA: Platinum	UK: 120,000	I'm Your Baby Tonight
"The Star Spangled Banner" (Note: "The Star Spangled Banner" was originally released as a commercial single on February 8, 1991, in the US. The single peaked at number 20 on the Billboard Hot 100 singles chart at the time, and was certified Gold by the RIAA on April 11, 1991. After the 9/11 attacks, the version was re-issued and reached a new peak of number six on the Hot 100 chart. Also, it was certified Platinum by the RIAA on October 3, 2001.)	1991	20	—	—	5	—	—	—	—	—	—	RIAA: Platinum		Non-album single
"Miracle"	1991	9	—	—	17	—	—	—	—	—	—			I'm Your Baby Tonight
"My Name Is Not Susan"	1991	20	118	—	43	52	14	22	31	―	29			I'm Your Baby Tonight
"I Belong to You"	1991	—	—	—	—	—	—	79	—	—	54			I'm Your Baby Tonight
"We Didn't Know" (Note: "We Didn't Know" was commercially released as a cassette single only in April 1992 and also a promotional CD maxi-single.) (with Stevie Wonder)	1992	—	—	—	—	—	—	—	—	—	—			I'm Your Baby Tonight
"I Will Always Love You"	1992	1	1	1	1	1	1	1	1	1	1	RIAA: 11× Platinum; ARIA: 4× Platinum; BPI: 2× Platinum; BVMI: Platinum; IFPI AUT: Gold; GLF: Platinum; NVPI: Platinum; SNEP: Gold	World: 24,000,000; UK: 2,289,000	The Bodyguard: Original Soundtrack Album
"I'm Every Woman"	1993	4	11	19	2	13	4	3	7	18	4	RIAA: Platinum; BPI: Silver; ARIA: Gold	UK: 205,000	The Bodyguard: Original Soundtrack Album
"I Have Nothing"	1993	4	28	—	1	39	4	22	―	39	3	RIAA: 4× Platinum; BPI: 2× Platinum		The Bodyguard: Original Soundtrack Album
"Run to You"	1993	31	72	—	10	58	9	33	—	—	15	RIAA: Platinum; BPI: Gold		The Bodyguard: Original Soundtrack Album
"Queen of the Night"	1993	—	88	—	39	64	26	21	―	36	14			The Bodyguard: Original Soundtrack Album
"Exhale (Shoop Shoop)"	1995	1	18	15	1	26	16	7	10	13	11	RIAA: Platinum; BPI: Silver	US: 1,500,000; UK: 100,000	Waiting to Exhale: Original Soundtrack Album
"Count On Me" (with CeCe Winans)	1996	8	87	28	26	75	―	30	―	31	12	RIAA: Platinum	World: 2,000,000; US: 800,000	Waiting to Exhale: Original Soundtrack Album
"Why Does It Hurt So Bad"	1996	26	99	—	45	—	—	—	—	—	—			Waiting to Exhale: Original Soundtrack Album
"I Believe in You and Me"	1996	4	70	—	59	98	—	74	46	―	16	RIAA: Platinum		The Preacher's Wife: Original Soundtrack Album
"Step by Step"	1997	15	12	6	23	8	14	11	15	15	13	RIAA: Gold; ARIA: Gold; BPI: Gold; BVMI: Gold		The Preacher's Wife: Original Soundtrack Album
"My Heart Is Calling"	1997	77	—	—	—	—	—	—	—	—	—			The Preacher's Wife: Original Soundtrack Album
"When You Believe" (with Mariah Carey)	1998	15	13	6	20	8	7	5	2	2	4	RIAA: Platinum; ARIA: Gold; BPI: Platinum; BVMI: Gold; GLF: Platinum; IFPI SWI: Gold; SNEP: Gold		My Love Is Your Love
"Heartbreak Hotel" (Note: "Heartbreak Hotel" was released as the second or third single from My Love Is Your Love in Australia, France, North America in 1999, but as the third single from Whitney: The Greatest Hits in Germany, the Netherlands, Switzerland, and the UK between December 2000 and January 2001.) (with Faith Evans and Kelly Price)	1998	2	17	—	16	61	41	35	—	77	25	RIAA: 2× Platinum	US: 1,300,000	My Love Is Your Love
"It's Not Right but It's Okay"	1999	4	88	20	3	14	21	10	12	18	3	RIAA: Platinum; BPI: 2× Platinum		My Love Is Your Love
"My Love Is Your Love"	1999	4	27	2	10	2	2	3	2	2	2	RIAA: 2× Platinum; BPI: Platinum; BVMI: Platinum; IFPI AUT: Platinum; IFPI SWI: Platinum; GLF: Platinum; NVPI: Gold; SNEP: Silver		My Love Is Your Love
"I Learned from the Best"	1999	27	116	—	—	48	18	20	23	28	19		UK: 95,000	My Love Is Your Love
"—" denotes releases that did not chart

=== 2000s ===
List of singles, with selected chart positions
Title	Year	Peak chart positions										Certifications	Album
Title	Year	US	AUS	AUT	CAN	GER	IRE	NLD	SWE	SWI	UK	Certifications	Album
"Same Script, Different Cast" (with Deborah Cox)	2000	70	—	—	38	—	—	—	—	—	—		Whitney: The; Greatest Hits
"Could I Have This Kiss Forever" (Note: Both "Could I Have This Kiss Forever" and "Same Script, Different Cast" reached their peak positions on the Hot 100 with airplay points only. On descending the charts, the latter was commercially released as a 12-inch vinyl maxi-single while the former was not in the US.) (with Enrique Iglesias)	2000	52	12	8	3	5	8	1	2	1	7	ARIA: Gold; BVMI: Gold; GLF: Platinum; IFPI SWI: Gold; SNEP: Silver	Whitney: The; Greatest Hits
"If I Told You That" (with George Michael)	2000	—	37	—	—	58	25	19	44	33	9		Whitney: The; Greatest Hits
"Fine" (Note: "Fine" was released as a promotional single for R&B radio only in the US. In Europe, the song was commercially issued as a CD maxi-single in November 2000.)	2000	—	—	—	—	—	—	—	50	—	—		Whitney: The; Greatest Hits
"The Star Spangled Banner" (re-issue)	2001	6	—	—	5	—	—	—	—	—	—	RIAA: Platinum	Non-album single
"Whatchulookinat"	2002	96	48	53	3	47	33	29	29	22	13		Just Whitney
"One of Those Days"	2002	72	48	—	—	—	—	80	—	94	—		Just Whitney
"On My Own"	2003	84	—	—	24	—	—	—	—	79	—	RIAA: Gold (Video single)	Just Whitney
"Love That Man" (Note: "Love That Man" was released as a commercial 12-inch vinyl maxi-single (double pack) only in the US on May 20, 2003.)	2003	—	—	—	—	—	—	—	—	—	—		Just Whitney
"One Wish (for Christmas)"	2003	—	—	—	—	—	—	—	—	—	—		One Wish: The Holiday Album
"I Look to You" (Note: In Germany, "I Look to You" was released as a double A-side single with "Million Dollar Bill".)	2009	70	—	47	68	41	—	65	33	16	115	RIAA: Platinum	I Look to You
"Million Dollar Bill"	2009	100	181	—	62	41	8	58	22	40	5	BPI: Platinum	I Look to You
"—" denotes releases that did not chart

=== 2010s (Posthumous releases) ===
List of singles, with selected chart positions
Title	Year	Peak chart positions										Certification	Album
Title	Year	US	AUS	CAN	FRA	GER	IRE	NLD	SWE	SWI	UK	Certification	Album
"Celebrate" (with Jordin Sparks)	2012	—	—	—	—	—	—	—	—	—	—		Sparkle: Original Motion Picture Soundtrack
"His Eye Is on the Sparrow"	2012	—	—	—	—	—	—	—	—	—	—		Sparkle: Original Motion Picture Soundtrack
"I Look to You" (with R. Kelly)	2012	—	—	—	—	—	—	—	—	—	—		I Will Always Love You: The Best of Whitney Houston
"Memories" (with Siti Nurhaliza)	2016	—	—	—	—	—	—	—	—	—	—		Non-album single
"Higher Love" (with Kygo)	2019	63	20	22	71	22	4	29	9	10	2	RIAA: 3× Platinum; ARIA: 3× Platinum; BPI: 3× Platinum; BVMI: Platinum; MC: 2× Platinum; SNEP: Gold	Golden Hour
"Do You Hear What I Hear?" (with Pentatonix)	2019	—	—	—	—	—	—	—	—	—	—	RIAA : Gold	The Best of Pentatonix Christmas
"—" denotes releases that did not chart

=== 2020s (Posthumous releases) ===
List of singles, with selected chart positions
Title	Year	Peak chart positions			Certification	Album
Title	Year	US Dance /Elect.	CAN AC	UK	Certification	Album
"How Will I Know" (with Clean Bandit)	2021	23	12	92	MC: Gold; BPI: Silver	I Wanna Dance with Somebody (The Movie: Whitney New, Classic and Reimagined)
"Don't Cry for Me" (with Sam Feldt)	2022	35	—	—		I Wanna Dance with Somebody (The Movie: Whitney New, Classic and Reimagined)
"Love Is"	2024	—	—	— (Note: "Love Is" did not enter the UK Singles Chart, but peaked at number 25 on the UK Physical Singles Chart.)		The Concert for a New South Africa (Durban)
"It’s Not Right but It’s Okay" (with Felix Jaehn)	2025	—	—	—		Non-album single
"I Wanna Dance with Somebody (Who Loves Me)" (with Calum Scott)	2025	—	—	— (Note: "I Wanna Dance with Somebody (Who Loves Me)" did not enter the UK Singles Chart, but peaked at number 13 on the UK Singles Downloads Chart.)		Avenoir
"—" denotes releases that did not chart

=== Chart re-entries ===
List of singles, with selected chart positions
Title	Original release year	Re-entry year	Peak chart positions										Album
Title	Original release year	Re-entry year	US	AUS	AUT	CAN	GER	IRE	NLD	SWE	SWI	UK	Album
"I Will Always Love You"	1992	2012	3	8	10	6	19	13	5	56	3	14	The Bodyguard: Original Soundtrack Album
"I'm Every Woman"	1993	2012	—	95	—	—	—	—	—	—	—	73	The Bodyguard: Original Soundtrack Album
"I Have Nothing"	1993	2012	—	—	—	—	—	—	—	—	—	44	The Bodyguard: Original Soundtrack Album
"I Wanna Dance with Somebody (Who Loves Me)"	1987	2012	25	25	70	33	—	32	—	—	28	20	Whitney
"Didn't We Almost Have It All"	1987	2012	—	96	—	—	—	—	—	—	—	92	Whitney
"Where Do Broken Hearts Go"	1988	2012	—	—	—	—	—	—	—	—	—	74	Whitney
"Greatest Love of All"	1986	2012	36	56	—	—	—	—	—	—	55	58	Whitney Houston
"How Will I Know"	1985	2012	49	67	—	—	—	—	100	—	—	56	Whitney Houston
"Saving All My Love for You"	1985	2012	—	—	—	—	—	—	—	—	—	59	Whitney Houston
"One Moment in Time"	1988	2012	—	—	—	—	—	42	—	—	—	40	1988 Summer Olympics Album
"My Love Is Your Love"	1999	2012	—	—	—	—	—	88	—	—	—	42	My Love Is Your Love
"It's Not Right but It's Okay"	1999	2012	—	—	—	—	—	—	—	—	—	61	My Love Is Your Love
"Million Dollar Bill"	2009	2012	—	—	—	—	—	—	—	—	—	62	I Look to You
"—" denotes releases that did not chart

== Featured singles ==
Title	Year	Peak chart positions									Certifications	Album
Title	Year	US	US R&B	US Dance	AUS	CAN	GER	NLD	SWI	UK	Certifications	Album
"Are You the Woman" (Kashif featuring Whitney Houston)	1984	―	25	―	―	―	―	―	―	―		Send Me Your Love
"Stop the Madness" (Note: "Stop the Madness" is an anti-drug anthem produced Michael Stokes and written by Stokes, Tom Reid, Sharon Barnes and Lathan Armour, released as a 12-inch single featuring its dance version by MCA Records in early 1986.) (among Stop the Madness)	1986	―	―	―	―	―	―	―	―	―		Non-album singles
"King Holiday" (Note: "King Holiday" was released as a charity single in honor of Martin Luther King, Jr. Day, which was first celebrated as a national holiday in the United States on January 20, 1986. Houston contributed to the song as a part of the all-star group, the King Dream Chorus and Holiday Crew.) (among King Dream Chorus and Holiday Crew)	1986	―	30	―	―	―	―	―	―	―		Non-album singles
"It Isn't, It Wasn't, It Ain't Never Gonna Be" (with Aretha Franklin)	1989	41	5	18	―	43	―	40	―	29		Through the Storm
"Something in Common" (with Bobby Brown)	1993	— (Note: "Something in Common" did not enter the Billboard Hot 100, but peaked at number 32 on the Radio Songs chart.)	— (Note: "Something in Common" did not enter the Billboard Hot R&B/Hip-Hop Songs, but peaked at number 30 on the R&B/Hip-Hop Airplay chart.)	—	82	26	58	36	41	16		Bobby
"—" denotes releases that did not chart

== Promotional singles ==
Title	Year	Peak chart positions						Album
Title	Year	US	US R&B /HH	US Dance	JPN	IRL	UK	Album
"Someone for Me" (Remix) (Note: In the UK, "Someone for Me (Remix)" was the first single from the Whitney Houston album, issued as a double A-side single with "Greatest Love of All" before the release of the album.)	1985	—	—	—	—	—	118	Whitney Houston
"Takin' a Chance" (Note: "Takin' a Chance", used as the theme song of a Sanyo TV commercial, was released as a 3-inch CD single including "Love Is a Contact Sport" in Japan only on October 21, 1989. The single peaked at number 88 on the Japanese Singles chart. The following year the song was also included on the Japanese edition of the I'm Your Baby Tonight album.)	1989	—	—	—	—	—	—	I'm Your Baby Tonight
"I Didn't Know My Own Strength"	2009	— (Note: "I Didn't Know My Own Strength" did not enter the Billboard Hot 100, but peaked at number 19 on the Bubbling Under Hot 100 chart.)	66	17	16	38	44	I Look to You
"—" denotes releases that did not chart

== Other charted songs ==
Title	Year	Peak chart positions						Certifications	Album
Title	Year	US	US R&B /HH	US Gospel	US Holiday	FRA	KOR	Certifications	Album
"Do You Hear What I Hear"	1987	— (Note: "Do You Hear What I Hear" did not enter the Billboard Hot 100, but peaked at number 37 on the Digital Songs chart.)	— (Note: "Do You Hear What I Hear" did not enter the Billboard Hot R&B/Hip-Hop Songs chart, but peaked at number 4 on the Hot R&B/Hip-Hop Digital Songs chart.)	— (Note: "Do You Hear What I Hear" did not enter the Billboard Gospel chart, but peaked at number 1 on the Gospel Digital chart.)	35	—	—		A Very Special Christmas
"Jesus Loves Me"	1992	—	—	— (Note: "Jesus Loves Me" did not enter the Billboard Gospel chart, but peaked at number 4 on the Gospel Digital chart.)	—	67	—		The Bodyguard: Original Soundtrack Album
"Look Into Your Heart"	1994	— (Note: "Look into Your Heart" did not enter the Billboard Hot 100, but peaked at number 68 on the Radio Songs chart.)	— (Note: "Look into Your Heart" did not enter the Billboard Hot R&B/Hip-Hop Songs, but peaked at number 50 on the R&B/Hip-Hop Airplay chart.)	—	—	—	—		A Tribute to Curtis Mayfield
"Joy"	1996	—	—	— (Note: "Joy" did not enter the Billboard Gospel chart, but peaked at number 22 on the Gospel Digital chart.)	—	—	—		The Preacher's Wife: Original Soundtrack Album
"Hold On, Help Is on the Way"	1996	—	—	— (Note: "Hold On, Help Is on the Way" did not enter the Billboard Gospel chart, but peaked at number 16 on the Gospel Digital chart.)	—	—	—		The Preacher's Wife: Original Soundtrack Album
"I Go to the Rock"	1996	—	—	— (Note: "I Go to the Rock" did not enter the Billboard Gospel chart, but peaked at number 14 on the Gospel Digital chart.)	—	—	–		The Preacher's Wife: Original Soundtrack Album
"I Love the Lord"	1996	—	—	— (Note: "I Love the Lord" did not enter the Billboard Gospel chart, but peaked at number 3 on the Gospel Digital chart.)	—	—	—		The Preacher's Wife: Original Soundtrack Album
"You Were Loved"	1996	—	—	— (Note: "You Were Loved" did not enter the Billboard Gospel chart, but peaked at number 17 on the Gospel Digital chart.)	—	—	—		The Preacher's Wife: Original Soundtrack Album
"Who Would Imagine a King"	1996	—	—	— (Note: "Who Would Imagine a King" did not enter the Billboard Gospel chart, but peaked at number 4 on the Gospel Digital chart.)	—	—	—		The Preacher's Wife: Original Soundtrack Album
"Joy to the World"	1996	—	—	— (Note: "Joy to the World" did not enter the Billboard Gospel chart, but peaked at number 2 on the Gospel Digital chart.)	—	—	—		The Preacher's Wife: Original Soundtrack Album
"The First Noel"	2003	—	—	— (Note: "The First Noel" did not enter the Billboard Gospel chart, but peaked at number 12 on the Gospel Digital chart.)	— (Note: "The First Noel" did not enter the Billboard Holiday 100, but peaked at number 49 on the Holiday Streaming chart.)	—	—		One Wish: The Holiday Album
"Little Drummer Boy"	2003	—	—	— (Note: "Little Drummer Boy" did not enter the Billboard Gospel chart, but peaked at number 12 on the Gospel Streaming chart.)	—	—	—		One Wish: The Holiday Album
"Cantique de Noël (O Holy Night)"	2003	—	—	— (Note: "Cantique de Noël (O Holy Night)" did not enter the Billboard Gospel chart, but peaked at number 5 on the Gospel Streaming chart.)	—	—	—		One Wish: The Holiday Album
"Worth It"	2009	—	61	—	—	—	— (Note: "Worth It" did not enter the South Korean chart, but peaked at number 56 on the South Korean International chart.)		I Look to You
"Call You Tonight"	2009	—	—	—	—	—	— (Note: "Call You Tonight" did not enter the South Korean chart, but peaked at number 161 on the South Korean International chart.)		I Look to You
"Never Give Up"	2012	—	—	—	—	—	— (Note: "Never Give Up" did not enter the South Korean chart, but peaked at number 89 on the South Korean International chart.)		I Will Always Love You: The Best of Whitney Houston
