= Nothing but Love World Tour =

2009–10 concert tour by Whitney Houston

- Tour by Whitney Houston
- Promotional poster for the Australian leg of the tour
- Location: 35 Europe; 6 Oceania; 7 Asia
- Associated album: I Look to You
- Start date: December 9, 2009
- End date: June 17, 2010
- Legs: 4
- No. of shows: 48
- Box office: $36.3 million ($53.59 in 2025 dollars)

Whitney Houston concert chronology
- Soul Divas Tour (2004); Nothing but Love World Tour (2009–10); An Evening with Whitney (2020–22)

The Nothing but Love World Tour was the tenth and final concert tour by American singer Whitney Houston. It was her first major tour in almost a decade and was used to promote her seventh studio album I Look to You released in 2009.

After Houston performed two dates in Russia during mid-December 2009, the official tour started on February 6, 2010, in Asia. Also visiting Australia and Europe, the tour was the 34th highest-earning of 2010, grossing over $36 million with 48 to 50 shows performed.

== Background ==
The tour was announced on October 12, 2009, on Houston's official website. By way of introduction, she stated:

This is my first full tour since the My Love Is Your Love tour and I am so excited to be performing for my fans around the world after all this time. I am putting together a great show and cannot wait to perform the songs from my new album 'I Look To You', along with some of your favorites.

The tour began with two rehearsal dates in Russia, under an unadvertised title. At the end of the rehearsal, the tour's title was changed to "Nothing But Love World Tour" with an "official" commencement in February 2010. Houston explained the meaning behind her tour's title is how she overcame her tough times. "I chose this title because what I had under any circumstance was love […] I wouldn't have overcome tough time without my mom and my daughter. My daughter is especially like a friend who supported me and stayed with me at the studio when I was working on the album."

== Public criticism ==
On February 22, the opening night of the Australian leg of the tour suffered negative reviews from critics. Her performance in the Brisbane Entertainment Centre was poorly received, and some fans reportedly walked out of the arenas. Houston's vocal condition was described as sounding hoarse and weak; one particularly low moment occurred when she paused for several minutes in the middle of performing "I Will Always Love You" to sip some water.

Houston's promoter commented that Houston's use of cigarettes was partly to blame for her strained voice and stated "It is what it is. She's comfortable with the show she's performing. She knows she's not hitting every note like she used to. But it's value for money; it's Whitney Houston warts and all." Houston received a similar response during her concert at the Forum Copenhagen. Some spectators stated the performance was not up to par on what they had expected; others stated that the singer is a legend, has been on the music scene for 25 years at the time, and considering what she had been through, the performance was fine. Having grossed over $36 million, the tour itself was a financial success; however, the promoter, Andrew McManus, lost $2 million bringing her to Australia.

== Opening acts ==
- Anthony Callea (Australia)
- Azaryah Davidson (Entire European tour)
- Waylon (London)
- Alex Gardner (Glasgow)
- Karima (Milan, Rome)
- Marc Sway (Switzerland)
- Moto Boy (Stockholm)
- Axl Smith (Helsinki)

== Setlist ==
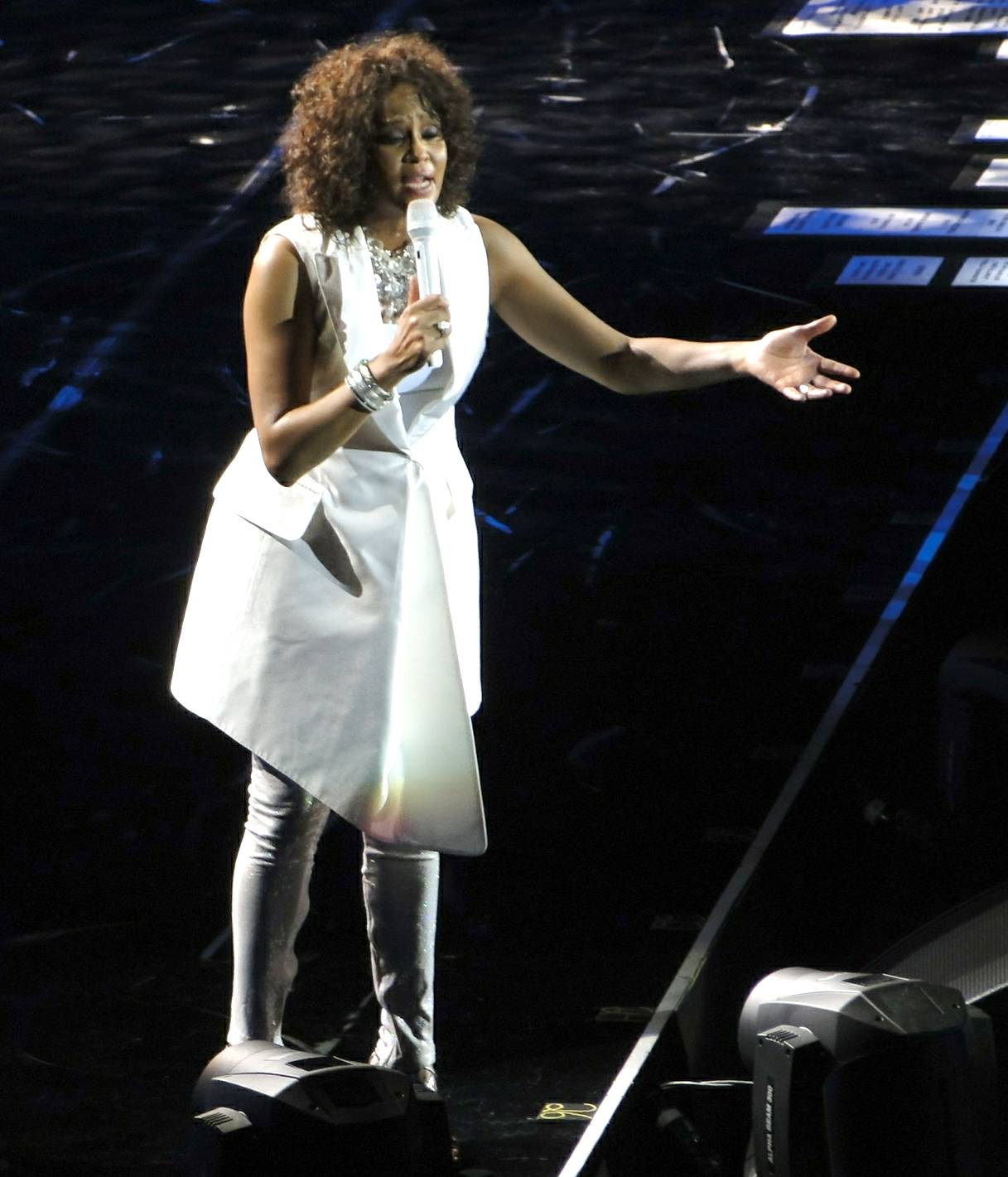
Houston at The O_{2} Arena in London

Russia
1. "I Wanna Dance with Somebody (Who Loves Me)"
2. "How Will I Know"
3. "Exhale (Shoop Shoop)"
4. "I Didn't Know My Own Strength"
5. "My Love Is Your Love"
6. "Saving All My Love For You"
7. "Greatest Love of All"
8. "All at Once"
9. "Man in the Mirror" (contain elements from "Missing You")
10. "I Will Always Love You"
11. "I Love the Lord"
12. "I Look to You"
13. "Million Dollar Bill"
Asia / Oceania
1. "For the Lovers"
2. "Nothin' But Love"
3. "I Didn't Know My Own Strength"
4. "My Love Is Your Love"
5. "Exhale (Shoop Shoop)"
6. "If I Told You That"
7. "It's Not Right but It's Okay"
8. "Saving All My Love for You" / "Greatest Love of All" / "All at Once"
9. "I Learned from the Best"
10. "I Love the Lord"
11. "Missing You" (contain excerpts from "Wanna Be Startin' Somethin'" and "The Way You Make Me Feel")
12. "I Wanna Dance with Somebody (Who Loves Me)"
13. "How Will I Know"
14. "I Look to You"
15. "Step By Step"
16. "I Will Always Love You"
17. "Million Dollar Bill"
Europe
1. Instrumental Intro (contains elements of "Queen of the Night", "I'm Every Woman" and "How Will I Know")
2. "For the Lovers"
3. "Nothin' But Love"
4. "I Look to You"
5. "My Love Is Your Love"
6. "It's Not Right but It's Okay" (contain excerpts from "Like I Never Left")
7. "Step By Step"
8. "A Song for You" (contain excerpts from "The Way You Make Me Feel")
9. "Saving All My Love for You" / "Greatest Love of All" / "All at Once"
10. "I Learned from the Best"
11. "I Love the Lord"
12. "I Will Always Love You"
13. "I Wanna Dance with Somebody (Who Loves Me)"
14. "How Will I Know"
15. "I Didn't Know My Own Strength"
16. "Million Dollar Bill" (Freemasons Radio Edit)

Notes

- December 12: the concert in Saint Petersburg, Houston performed "Step by Step" in place of "Exhale (Shoop Shoop)."
- During the concerts in March, "Missing You" was not performed.
- Houston did not perform "Step by Step" and "I Didn't Know My Own Strength" during shows in Dublin and select dates in England.
- March 1: the concert in Melbourne, Australia, Houston did not perform "I Didn't Know My Own Strength," "If I Told You That," and "Exhale (Shoop Shoop)." Additionally, she briefly performed "Never Can Say Goodbye," "God Will Take Care Of You," and "Like I Never Left."
- March 4: the concert in Adelaide, Australia, Houston performed "Who Would Imagine a King" and "I Have Nothing" with a fan.
- April 13: the concert in Birmingham, England, Houston performed "I Am Changing." Additionally, Houston included the video interlude for "One Moment in Time".
- April 20: the concert at The O_{2} in Dublin, Ireland, Houston was joined on stage by an audience member to perform "Greatest Love of All." On select tour dates in Europe, Houston performed "Stormy Weather" as a tribute to legendary singer/actress Lena Horne.
- May 1: at the SEC Centre in Glasgow, Scotland, Houston did not perform "It's Not Right but It's Okay." The song was also not performed in Milan, Italy and in Zurich, Switzerland. May 3, the concert at the Mediolanum Forum in Milan, Italy, and May 9, at Hallenstadion in Zurich, Switzerland, Houston began the encore with "I Wanna Dance With Somebody (Who Loves Me)" in place of "Million Dollar Bill."
- March 6: at Houston’s second night in Melbourne, she performed a snippet of “I Believe In You And Me” and “The Battle Hymn Of The Republic.”
- May 22: Houston did the chorus for "You Were Loved" before the end of "I Learned From The Best."

== Shows ==
List of concerts, showing date, city, country, venue, tickets sold, number of available tickets and amount of gross revenue
Date	City	Country	Venue	Attendance	Revenue
Europe
December 9, 2009	Moscow	Russia	Olimpiyskiy	—N/a	—N/a
December 12, 2009	Saint Petersburg	Russia	Ice Palace	—N/a	—N/a
Asia
February 6, 2010	Seoul	South Korea	Olympic Gymnastics Arena	—N/a	—N/a
February 7, 2010	Seoul	South Korea	Olympic Gymnastics Arena	—N/a	—N/a
February 11, 2010	Saitama	Japan	Saitama Super Arena	—N/a	—N/a
February 13, 2010	Saitama	Japan	Saitama Super Arena	—N/a	—N/a
February 14, 2010	Saitama	Japan	Saitama Super Arena	—N/a	—N/a
February 17, 2010	Osaka	Japan	Osaka-jō Hall	—N/a	—N/a
February 18, 2010	Osaka	Japan	Osaka-jō Hall	—N/a	—N/a
Oceania
February 22, 2010	Brisbane	Australia	Brisbane Entertainment Centre	7,386 / 7,732	$1,083,980
February 24, 2010	Sydney	Australia	Acer Arena	11,157 / 11,634	$1,610,830
February 27, 2010	Pokolbin	Australia	Hope Estate Winery Amphitheatre	—N/a	—N/a
March 1, 2010	Melbourne	Australia	Rod Laver Arena	10,366 / 11,206	$1,375,490
March 4, 2010	Adelaide	Australia	Adelaide Entertainment Centre	—N/a	—N/a
March 6, 2010	Melbourne	Australia	MCEC Plenary Hall	—N/a	—N/a
Europe
April 13, 2010	Birmingham	England	LG Arena	—N/a	—N/a
April 14, 2010	Nottingham	England	Trent FM Arena	—N/a	—N/a
April 17, 2010	Dublin	Ireland	The O_{2}	—N/a	—N/a
April 18, 2010	Dublin	Ireland	The O_{2}	—N/a	—N/a
April 20, 2010	Dublin	Ireland	The O_{2}	—N/a	—N/a
April 22, 2010	Newcastle	England	Metro Radio Arena	—N/a	—N/a
April 25, 2010	London	England	The O_{2} Arena	40,937 / 43,773	$5,271,620
April 26, 2010	London	England	The O_{2} Arena	40,937 / 43,773	$5,271,620
April 28, 2010	London	England	The O_{2} Arena	40,937 / 43,773	$5,271,620
May 1, 2010	Glasgow	Scotland	SECC Concert Hall 4	—N/a	—N/a
May 3, 2010	Milan	Italy	Mediolanum Forum	—N/a	—N/a
May 4, 2010	Rome	Italy	PalaLottomatica	—N/a	—N/a
May 9, 2010	Zürich	Switzerland	Hallenstadion	—N/a	—N/a
May 10, 2010	Geneva	Switzerland	SEG Geneva Arena	—N/a	—N/a
May 12, 2010	Berlin	Germany	O_{2} World	—N/a	—N/a
May 13, 2010	Leipzig	Germany	Arena Leipzig	—N/a	—N/a
May 16, 2010	Hanover	Germany	TUI Arena	—N/a	—N/a
May 17, 2010	Hamburg	Germany	O_{2} World Hamburg	6,377 / 9,953	$527,352
May 19, 2010	Vienna	Austria	Wiener Stadthalle	—N/a	—N/a
May 21, 2010	Munich	Germany	Olympiahalle	—N/a	—N/a
May 22, 2010	Stuttgart	Germany	Hanns-Martin-Schleyer-Halle	—N/a	—N/a
May 24, 2010	Antwerp	Belgium	Sportpaleis	11,629 / 12,399	$957,024
May 26, 2010	Oberhausen	Germany	König Pilsener Arena	—N/a	—N/a
May 27, 2010	Nuremberg	Germany	Arena Nürnberger Versicherung	—N/a	—N/a
May 29, 2010	Mannheim	Germany	SAP Arena	—N/a	—N/a
May 31, 2010	Frankfurt	Germany	Festhalle Frankfurt	—N/a	—N/a
June 3, 2010	Copenhagen	Denmark	Forum Copenhagen	—N/a	—N/a
June 4, 2010	Copenhagen	Denmark	Forum Copenhagen	—N/a	—N/a
June 6, 2010	Stavanger	Norway	Sørmarka Arena	—N/a	—N/a
June 8, 2010	Stockholm	Sweden	Ericsson Globe	—N/a	—N/a
June 10, 2010	Helsinki	Finland	Hartwall Areena	—N/a	—N/a
June 16, 2010	Manchester	England	Manchester Evening News Arena	8,831 / 12,265	$1,087,150
June 17, 2010	Manchester	England	Manchester Evening News Arena	8,831 / 12,265	$1,087,150
TOTAL				86,683 / 108,692	$11,913,446

Cancellations and rescheduled shows

March 6, 2010	New Plymouth, New Zealand	TSB Bowl of Brooklands	Cancelled
March 6, 2010	Perth, Australia	Members Equity Stadium	Cancelled
March 7, 2010	Perth, Australia	Members Equity Stadium	Cancelled
April 6, 2010	Paris, France	Palais Omnisports de Paris-Bercy	This performance was postponed to June 1, 2010
April 8, 2010	Manchester, England	Manchester Evening News Arena	This performance was postponed to June 16, 2010
April 9, 2010	Manchester, England	Manchester Evening News Arena	This performance was postponed to June 17, 2010
April 11, 2010	Glasgow, Scotland	SECC Concert Hall 4	This performance was postponed to May 1, 2010
April 30, 2010	Santa Cruz, Spain	El Recinto de la Autoridad Portuaria de Santa Cruz	Cancelled
June 1, 2010	Paris, France	Palais Omnisports de Paris-Bercy	Cancelled

== Critical reception ==
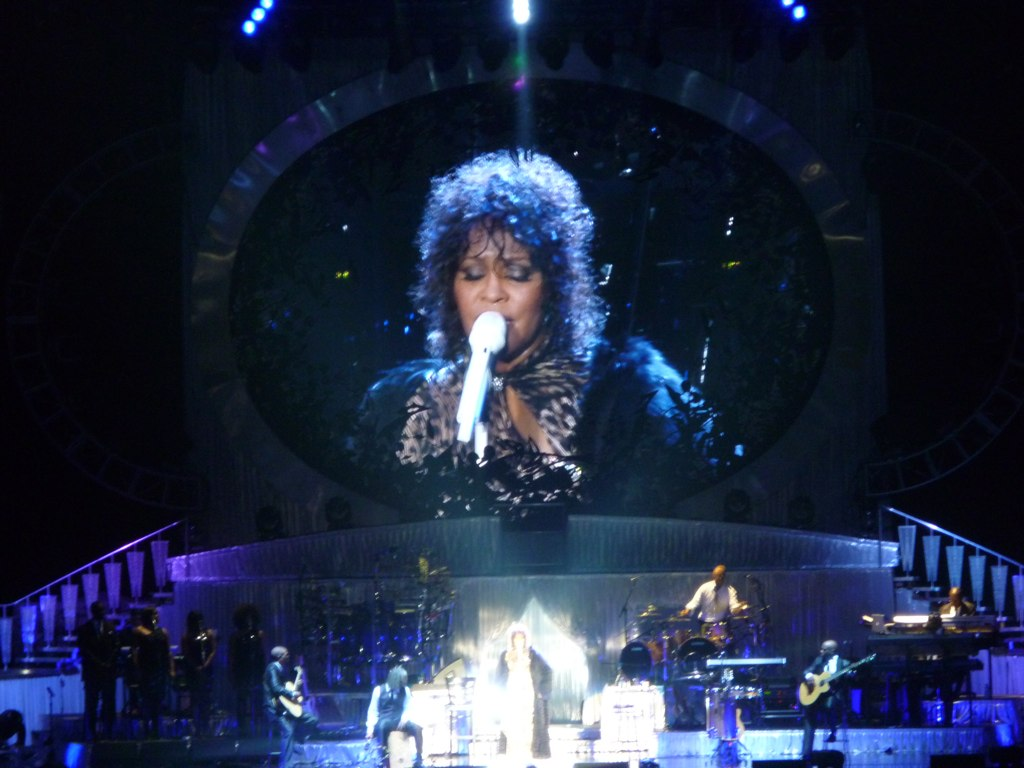
Houston performing in Milan

Along with upsets from spectators, the tour received mixed to negative reviews from critics for the Australian and European legs of the tour.

- Kathy McCabe (The Daily Telegraph) was not impressed with Houston's performance at the Acer Arena. She states, "Her acoustic set of old favourites unfortunately could not hide the very obvious problems with her voice, the strain and those coughs that punctuated the Brisbane show were back. By the time she got to the gospel section of the show a steady stream of disappointed, saddened and angry fans started streaming out the doors."
- Cameron Adams (Herald Sun) gave Houston's performance at the Rod Laver Arena a positive review, despite media upset from her performance in Brisbane. He writes, "Houston is just a more human superstar in 2010, now with added flaws that give her character. She hits all the right notes in I Look to You, the new song about what she calls her 'down times'. Indeed every time she hits a huge note her devoted audience break into applause."
- Candice Keller (The Advertiser) states that Houston still has "it" after viewing her performance at the Adelaide Entertainment Centre. She continues to write, "She knows how to engage a crowd and keep the fans eating from the palm of her hand. She'll tease with a knowing and tuneful hum, or tell a story about what brought her to today."
- Morwenna Ferrier (The Observer) applauds Houston's concert at the Trent FM Arena Nottingham. She further writes, "She kicks off successfully with two ballads from her 2009 album, I Look to You, 'For the Lovers' and 'Nothin' But Love' (love really is a theme with Houston.) The crowd, now warmed up, begins rattling with joy as she struts around all finger-clicky, black and proud during 'It's Not Right'. The songs include moments of genuine bonkersness."
- John Meagher (The Independent) praised Houston's backing vocalist and her brother, Gary Houston for the performance at The O_{2} in Dublin. He continues to write, "She spends more time chatting to the audience than singing in the early stages, although her conversation rarely strays beyond the 'I love you, Dublin' type. At one point she fixates on a young girl in the front row, but what initially is charming tries the patience of the audience and eventually becomes tedious. Even the more tolerable songs -- 'My Love is Your Love', for instance -- are carried by the strength of her backing vocalists and the enthusiastic singing of the crowd. There are slivers of the super-talented young Whitney -- a high note here, a spine-tingling pause there on 'I Will Always Love You' -- but they arrive so infrequently it hardly matters. Instead, you are left with the memory of her botched attempts to wring some magic from 'I Wanna Dance with Somebody' and 'How Will I Know?'"
- John Aizlewood (Evening Standard) gave her performance at The O_{2} Arena one out of five stars, stating "Where once she soared, now she wheezes and croaks, bludgeoning her perfect pop single I Wanna Dance With Somebody (Who Loves Me) into karaoke submission; stripping the moving My Love Is Your Love of all emotion and inflicting grisly carnage on I Will Always Love You (if she is late-period Judy Garland, this is her Over The Rainbow)."
- Fiona Shepherd (The Scotsman) gave the show at the Scottish Exhibition and Conference Centre two out of four stars. She writes, "It was obvious from this performance that she has lost her vocal agility, her stamina, her poise and her wits – or so it seemed from her nervous laughter, repetitive thank yous and rambling personal tributes. Her band were practiced at covering for her while she took time out to pat away the sweat, re-apply her make-up, impart another nugget of eccentric insight and generally procrastinate."

== Personnel ==
Band

- Musical Director / Drums – Michael Baker
- Percussion – Bashiri Johnson
- Keyboards – Jetro DaSilva
- Acoustic guitar – Jetro DaSilva
- Bass guitar – Matthew Garrison
- Keyboards – Shedrick Mitchell
- Guitar – Sherod Barnes
- Keyboards/Orchestrator – Adi Yeshaya
- Background vocalists – Gary Houston, Sharlotte Gibson, Cindy Mizelle, Valerie Pinkston

Choreography

- Choreographer – Jeri Slaughter
- Assistant choreographer – Paul Monte

Dancers

- Dres Reid, Ryan Chandler, Tre Holloway, Shannon Holtzapffel

Tour Management

- Manager – Tony Bullock
