= I Will Always Love You: The Best of Whitney Houston =

Greatest hits album by Whitney Houston
- Released: November 13, 2012
- Recorded: 1983–2009
- Genres: Pop; soul; dance; R&B
- Length: 79:38 (North American version / international version – disc 1); 67:47 (international version – disc 2)
- Label: RCA
- Producer: Various

Whitney Houston chronology
The Collection (2010)	I Will Always Love You: The Best of Whitney Houston (2012)	Whitney Houston Live: Her Greatest Performances (2014)

Singles from I Will Always Love You: The Best of Whitney Houston
- 1. "I Look to You" Released: September 25, 2012

I Will Always Love You: The Best of Whitney Houston is a posthumous greatest hits album by American recording artist Whitney Houston. The album was released on November 13, 2012 via RCA Records.

The album spans most of Houston's entire career and includes 29 of Houston's biggest chart hits from five of her seven studio albums and all of her soundtracks, including The Bodyguard and The Preacher's Wife. It includes all of the singer's eleven number one Billboard Hot 100 singles and 21 of her 23 top ten singles spanning from 1985 to 2000. The original issue of the album included two new tracks, a duet version of "I Look to You" with singer R. Kelly and the Jermaine Dupri-produced "Never Give Up".

It was re-released in August 2021 and included Houston's first posthumous hit, "Higher Love". The duet version of "I Look to You" with R. Kelly was replaced with the original 2009 solo version on this reissue.

It currently holds the Billboard chart record for being the longest charting female compilation of all time on both the Billboard 200 and Top R&B Albums charts.

The album won the NAACP Image Award for outstanding album in 2013.

== Background ==
Whitney Houston died on February 11, 2012, a day before the Grammy Awards was to take place. The day of her death, Houston was set to attend Clive Davis's pre-Grammy party at the Beverly Hilton in Beverly Hills, California. Davis turned his party into a tribute to Houston though he received criticism from not outright cancelling the event.

Following her death, her record sales spiked. For the next ten months following, Houston would sell over eight million records worldwide. For the weeks of March 3 and 10, 2012, Houston made history as the first female artist to have ten albums charting simultaneously on the Billboard 200 and also became the first female artist to have three albums inside the top ten of the same chart, earning posthumous notices from Guinness World Records. While Taylor Swift later broke the records in 2023, Houston still holds the record as a posthumous artist.

That November, the Recording Academy announced it would air an hourlong Grammy tribute to Houston titled We Will Always Love You: A Grammy Salute to Whitney Houston on CBS. The special event coincided with the release of Houston's first posthumous compilation album, I Will Always Love You: The Best of Whitney Houston.

== Content and release ==
Up until her death, Houston had released four compilation albums, with three released internationally and a fourth, Whitney: The Greatest Hits (2000), being the only Houston compilation released in the United States. The compilation was released on November 13, 2012 by RCA Records, Houston's label at the time of her death.

The CD version of the album initially featured sixteen of her hit singles spanning from 1985 and 1999 and two unreleased tracks, the Jermaine Dupri-produced "Never Give Up", a leftover song from the I Look to You sessions, and a duet rendition of Houston's 2009 comeback hit, "I Look to You" with its writer R. Kelly.

In addition, on digital and streaming services, the album was re-released as a double album with virtually every other hit single in her career, outside the singles from Houston's 2002 album, Just Whitney. It had already been released as a two-disc album outside the US in its initial release.

The tracks featured on I Will Always Love You: The Best of Whitney Houston appear either as their original album versions or as radio edits, in contrast with Whitney: The Greatest Hits, which featured many of Houston's hits in remixed form. The album also included new liner notes written by Clive Davis. Internationally, the compilation was released in both standard and deluxe versions. In North America, the album was issued as a single-disc release, which contains the same track listing as disc one of the international deluxe edition. An alternate two-disc edition of the album was released in North America available only through HSN. This version contains the standard 18-track version of the album and a second disc comprising five duets Houston recorded with other artists.

The Kelly duet version of "I Look to You" was released as a single on September 25, 2012 as the sole single from the album. On November 6, 2012, "Never Give Up" was released as a lyric video on Whitney Houston's official YouTube channel.

At the 2013 44th NAACP Image Awards, the album won two awards in the 'Outstanding Album' and 'Outstanding Song' categories, the latter of which was for "I Look To You".

In 2021, Houston's official website announced that the album would be released on vinyl on October 29. The reissue excluded the Kelly duet version of "I Look to You", replacing it with the solo Houston version, following Kelly's conviction of child abuse charges.

The double vinyl includes an additional track, the 2019 remix of "Higher Love" by Norwegian DJ Kygo. The original version of "Higher Love" first appeared as a bonus track on the Japanese edition of Houston's third studio album, I'm Your Baby Tonight (1990).

== Critical reception ==
Professional ratings
Review scores
Source	Rating
AllMusic	4/5 stars
Slant	3.5/5 stars

AllMusic editor Stephen Thomas Erlewine described I Will Always Love You: The Best of Whitney Houston as a posthumous compilation that focuses on Houston's biggest hits, with particular emphasis on her acclaimed ballads and dramatic vocal performances. While noting the inclusion of upbeat hits such as "I Wanna Dance with Somebody (Who Loves Me)," "So Emotional," "I'm Your Baby Tonight," and "How Will I Know," he observed that the collection favors her more emotional and romantic recordings. Erlewine considered the album a representative overview of Houston's career and concluded that it successfully captures her artistry and enduring appeal as a vocalist. Writing for Slant Magazine, Sal Cinquemani found that the album effectively showcases Houston's greatest hits and exceptional vocal talent, but argued that the inclusion of later recordings alongside her classic performances highlights the decline of her voice, making the compilation both a celebration of her legacy and a reminder of her tragic decline.

== Commercial performance ==
The week of its release, the album peaked at number 14 on the Billboard 200 and number 2 on Billboard Top R&B/Hip Hop Albums. Following the return of the Top R&B Albums chart on the week of January 26, 2013, the album landed and peaked at number 8 on that chart. On March 3, 2020, the album was certified gold by the RIAA for selling over 500,000 copies, becoming the eleventh consecutive record from Houston to do so. The duet version of "I Look to You" became a hit on various Billboard charts, reaching number 90 on Billboard's Hot R&B/Hip-Hop Songs chart, giving Houston her career 46th chart entry. On the Adult R&B Songs chart, the same song registered at number 29, becoming Houston's 26th entry on that chart. The song found bigger success on the gospel charts, debuting at number one on the Gospel Digital Songs chart on the week of October 13, 2012, where it stayed for a week becoming Houston's fourth number one single on that chart.

As of November 21, 2026, the album has spent 293 weeks on the Billboard 200 and counting and is her longest charting album ever on the chart. It is also the longest charting female compilation in the history of the Billboard 200, replacing H.E.R.'s 2017 compilation as the longest charting female compilation of all time on the chart on the week of February 24, 2024, where it charted for 181 weeks. It is also currently the longest-charting female greatest hits compilation after it surpassed Madonna's The Immaculate Collection after reaching 149 weeks for the week of May 27, 2023.

On the Top R&B/Hip-Hop Albums chart, it has spent a cumulative total of 65 weeks while on the Top R&B Albums chart, it has spent a cumulative record-setting 340 weeks on the chart so far.

In the UK, it peaked at number 13 for the week of 19 January 2023 and has been certified double platinum for selling over 600,000 copies and has spent a total 282 cumulative weeks so far on the chart, making it her second longest charting album in that country after The Ultimate Collection and one of the 100 longest charting albums in UK music history. Initially charting for the first eight weeks of its release before the re-emergence of Houston's previous compilation, The Ultimate Collection between the weeks of 1 December 2012 and 19 January 2013, the album returned to the chart for the week of 26 August 2021 and has since spent 274 consecutive weeks on the chart, including 252 weeks inside the top 75. In the UK, the compilation is the third longest charting greatest hits collection by a female artist of all time in the country just behind Madonna's The Immaculate Collection (1990) and Houston's previous compilation The Ultimate Collection (2007).

For the week of 10 May 2024, the compilation achieved a 150th cumulative week on the chart. In achieving this, Houston joined a handful of recording artists who sent multiple albums on the UK OCC Albums chart for 150 or more weeks.

The album peaked at number 25 on the Irish Albums chart and has spent 164 weeks on that chart so far.

The album hit No. 1 on the OLiS albums chart in Poland in 2018 and has been certified platinum in the region.

In New Zealand, the album peaked at number 29 and later was certified platinum in that country.

== Track listing ==
North American and International edition – Disc 1
No.	Title	Writer(s)	Album	Length
1.	"You Give Good Love"	LaLa	Whitney Houston	4:36
2.	"Saving All My Love for You"	Gerry Goffin; Michael Masser	Whitney Houston	3:57
3.	"How Will I Know"	George Merrill; Shannon Rubicam; Narada Michael Walden	Whitney Houston	4:33
4.	"Greatest Love of All"	Linda Creed; Masser	Whitney Houston	4:48
5.	"I Wanna Dance with Somebody (Who Loves Me)"	Merrill; Rubicam	Whitney	4:50
6.	"Didn't We Almost Have It All"	Masser; Will Jennings	Whitney	5:05
7.	"So Emotional"	Billy Steinberg; Tom Kelly	Whitney	4:36
8.	"Where Do Broken Hearts Go"	Frank Wildhorn; Chuck Jackson	Whitney	4:36
9.	"I'm Your Baby Tonight"	L.A. Reid; Babyface	I'm Your Baby Tonight	5:00
10.	"All the Man That I Need"	Dean Pitchford; Michael Gore	I'm Your Baby Tonight	4:09
11.	"I Will Always Love You"	Dolly Parton	The Bodyguard: Original Soundtrack Album	4:30
12.	"I'm Every Woman"	Nickolas Ashford; Valerie Simpson	The Bodyguard: Original Soundtrack Album	4:45
13.	"I Have Nothing"	David Foster; Linda Thompson	The Bodyguard: Original Soundtrack Album	4:50
14.	"Exhale (Shoop Shoop)"	Babyface	Waiting to Exhale: Original Soundtrack Album	3:21
15.	"I Believe in You and Me" (Single version)	David Wolfert; Sandy Linzer	The Preacher's Wife: Original Soundtrack Album	3:52
16.	"My Love Is Your Love" (Radio edit)	Wyclef Jean; Jerry Duplessis	My Love Is Your Love	4:03
17.	"I Look to You" (with R. Kelly^{[a]})	R. Kelly	Previously unreleased	3:39
18.	"Never Give Up"	Jermaine Dupri; Bryan-Michael Cox; Johntá Austin	Previously unreleased	4:01
19.	"Higher Love" (with Kygo) (Vinyl reissue))	Steve Winwood; Will Jennings	Golden Hour	3:49
Total length:				79:38

International and European edition – Disc 2
No.	Title	Writer(s)	Album	Length
1.	"Love Will Save the Day"	Toni C.	Whitney	5:21
2.	"One Moment in Time"	Albert Hammond; John Bettis	1988 Summer Olympics Album	4:45
3.	"It Isn't, It Wasn't, It Ain't Never Gonna Be" (Duet with Aretha Franklin)	Hammond; Diane Warren	Through the Storm	4:50
4.	"My Name Is Not Susan"	Eric Foster White	I'm Your Baby Tonight	4:37
5.	"I Belong to You"	Franne Golde; Derek Bramble	I'm Your Baby Tonight	5:29
6.	"Run to You"	Allan Rich; Jud Friedman	The Bodyguard: Original Soundtrack Album	4:24
7.	"Queen of the Night"	Whitney Houston; Reid; Babyface; Daryl Simmons	The Bodyguard: Original Soundtrack Album	3:07
8.	"Count On Me" (Duet with CeCe Winans)	Babyface; W. Houston; Michael Houston	Waiting to Exhale: Original Soundtrack Album	4:26
9.	"Step by Step"	Annie Lennox	The Preacher's Wife: Original Soundtrack Album	4:12
10.	"It's Not Right but It's Okay"	Rodney Jerkins; Fred Jerkins III; LaShawn Daniels; Isaac Phillips; Toni Estes	My Love Is Your Love	4:51
11.	"I Learned from the Best" (Radio edit)	Warren	My Love Is Your Love	3:56
12.	"If I Told You That"	R. Jerkins; F. Jerkins; Daniels; Estes	My Love Is Your Love	4:38
13.	"Heartbreak Hotel" (featuring Faith Evans and Kelly Price)	Carsten Schack; Kenneth Karlin; Tamara Savage	My Love Is Your Love	4:42
14.	"Million Dollar Bill"	Alicia Keys; Kasseem Dean; Norman Harris	I Look to You	3:24
15.	"All at Once" (Japan bonus track)	Masser; Jeffrey Osborne	Whitney Houston	4:32
Total length:				67:47

North American HSN bonus edition – Disc 2
No.	Title	Writer(s)	Album	Length
1.	"Hold Me" (Duet with Teddy Pendergrass)	Masser; Linda Creed	Whitney Houston	5:59
2.	"If You Say My Eyes Are Beautiful" (Duet with Jermaine Jackson)	Elliot Willensky	Precious Moments	4:20
3.	"I Know Him So Well" (Duet with Cissy Houston)	Tim Rice; Benny Anderson; Björn Ulvaeus	Whitney	4:29
4.	"It Isn't, It Wasn't, It Ain't Never Gonna Be" (Duet with Aretha Franklin)	Hammond; Warren	Through the Storm	4:52
5.	"Count On Me" (Duet with Cece Winans)	Babyface; W. Houston; M. Houston	Waiting to Exhale: Original Soundtrack Album	4:26
Total length:				24:40

=== Notes ===
- ^[a] – On the 2021 reissue, the duet version of "I Look to You" was replaced with the 2009 solo version.

== Personnel ==
- Michael Masser – producer
- Narada Michael Walden – producer
- David Foster – producer
- Kashif – producer
- L.A. Reid – producer
- Babyface – producer
- Rodney Jerkins – producer
- David Cole – producer
- Robert Clivillés – producer
- Louis Biancaniello – producer
- Wyclef Jean – producer
- Jerry Duplessis – producer
- Teddy Riley – producer
- John Benitez – producer
- Jermaine Jackson – producer
- Tom Keane – producer
- Mervyn Warren – producer
- Bryan-Michael Cox – producer
- Jermaine Dupri – producer
- Carsten Schack – producer
- Kenneth Karlin – producer
- Alicia Keys – producer
- Kaseem Dean – producer
- R. Kelly – producer
- Chris Gehringer – compilation mastering at Sterling Sound

== Charts ==
=== Weekly charts ===
Weekly chart performance for I Will Always Love You: The Best of Whitney Houston
Chart (2012–2023)	Peak position
Belgian Albums (Ultratop Flanders)	99
Belgian Albums (Ultratop Wallonia)	65
Canadian Albums (Billboard)	59
Dutch Albums (Album Top 100)	61
French Albums (SNEP)	99
Greek Albums (IFPI Greece)	20
Hungarian Albums (MAHASZ)	17
Irish Albums (Official Charts)	25
Italian Albums (FIMI)	37
Japanese Albums (Oricon)	90
New Zealand Albums (RMNZ)	29
Polish Albums (ZPAV)	1
Portuguese Albums (AFP)	29
Scottish Albums (Official Charts)	37
South Korean Albums (Circle) Deluxe Edition	33
Spanish Albums (Promusicae)	44
Swiss Albums (Schweizer Hitparade)	87
UK Albums (Official Charts)	13
UK R&B Albums (Official Charts)	2
US Billboard 200	14
US Top R&B/Hip-Hop Albums (Billboard)	2
US Top R&B Albums (Billboard)	8

=== Year-end charts ===
2013 year-end chart performance for I Will Always Love You: The Best of Whitney Houston
Chart (2013)	Position
US Billboard 200	168
US Top R&B/Hip Hop Albums (Billboard)	30
US Top Current Album Sales (Billboard)	161

2018 year-end chart performance for I Will Always Love You: The Best of Whitney Houston
Chart (2018)	Position
Polish Albums (ZPAV)	24

2021 year-end chart performance for I Will Always Love You: The Best of Whitney Houston
Chart (2021)	Position
US Billboard 200	185
US Top R&B Albums (Billboard)	18

2022 year-end chart performance for I Will Always Love You: The Best of Whitney Houston
Chart (2022)	Position
UK Albums (OCC)	41
US Billboard 200	137
US Top R&B Albums (Billboard)	16

2023 year-end chart performance for I Will Always Love You: The Best of Whitney Houston
Chart (2023)	Position
UK Albums (OCC)	36
US Billboard 200	121
US Top R&B Albums (Billboard)	17

2024 year-end chart performance for I Will Always Love You: The Best of Whitney Houston
Chart (2024)	Position
UK Albums (OCC)	53
US Billboard 200	160
US Top R&B Albums (Billboard)	18

2025 year-end chart performance for I Will Always Love You: The Best of Whitney Houston
Chart (2025)	Position
UK Albums (OCC)	61
US Billboard 200	169
US Top R&B Albums (Billboard)	21

== Certifications ==
Certifications for I Will Always Love You: The Best of Whitney Houston
Region	Certification	Certified units/sales
New Zealand (RMNZ)	Platinum	15,000^{‡}
Poland (ZPAV)	Platinum	20,000^{‡}
United Kingdom (BPI)	2× Platinum	600,000^{‡}
United States (RIAA)	Gold	500,000^{‡}
^{‡} Sales+streaming figures based on certification alone.

== Accolades ==
=== NAACP Image Awards ===
Year	Nominee / work	Award	Result
2013	"I Look to You" (with R. Kelly)	Best Outstanding Song	Won
2013	I Will Always Love You: The Best of Whitney Houston	Best Outstanding Album	Won

== Release history ==
Release history and formats for I Will Always Love You: The Best of Whitney Houston
Country	Date	Label(s)	Format	Edition
United States	November 13, 2012	RCA	CD, digital download	Standard, HSN
Finland	November 16, 2012	RCA	CD, digital download	Deluxe (32 tracks)
United Kingdom	November 19, 2012	RCA	CD, digital download	Standard, deluxe
Japan	November 26, 2012	RCA	CD, digital download	Standard, deluxe
United States	October 29, 2021	RCA	Vinyl, digital download	Standard, deluxe (19 tracks, vinyl; 33 tracks, digital download)
