= Larry Jackson (music executive) =

American music executive

- Born: September 28, 1980 (age 45); San Francisco, California, U.S.
- Occupation: Music executive
- Years active: 1998–present
- Title: CEO and founder, gamma. (2023–present); Global creative director, Apple Music (2014–2022)
- Website: thegamma.com

Lawrence Jackson (born September 28, 1980) is an American music executive who is the CEO and founder of gamma., a multimedia company. He was formerly global creative director of Apple Music, and is credited with helping to launch and expand the platform.

== Biography ==
=== Early life and career ===
Larry Jackson was born and raised in San Francisco, where he frequently listened and called in to the local radio station KMEL during his childhood. When he was 11, his father gave him a set of turntables and a microphone from RadioShack so that he could practice DJing. He started apprenticing at KMEL shortly after, and became an intern and board operator at the station at age 14. At age 16, he became one of the youngest music directors in the station's history. He later dropped out of high school because of the amount of time he spent at the station. During his time at KMEL, it was the highest rated station in its market.

=== Early work with Clive Davis ===
It was at KMEL that he was discovered by producer and executive Clive Davis, who began mentoring him in branding and marketing when he was 19. Jackson began working for Davis in A&R in 2000. He eventually became an A&R executive at labels such as RCA Records, Arista Records, J Records and Sony Music Group.

Jackson later described what Davis taught him as "the science of what makes a hit. And, also, what makes the superstar." Jackson was responsible for signing artists such as Leona Lewis, Jennifer Hudson, and Fantasia. He produced several albums during this period, including Whitney Houston's final album I Look to You. He produced Hudson's self-titled 2009 album, which won a Grammy Award for Best R&B Album. He also produced Lewis' album Spirit, which became one of the best selling UK albums in history.

Jackson left Sony in 2010. He described his departure from the company as "the gift of all gifts" as it allowed him to pursue his interests more creatively.

=== Interscope ===
After leaving Sony, Jackson joined Interscope Records where he worked with Jimmy Iovine as executive vice president of A&R. The first artist Jackson signed at Interscope was singer Lana Del Rey. He convinced Interscope to promote her through long-form music videos which would appeal to her online following rather than traditional radio ads. He also signed and promoted artists such as Chief Keef.

=== Beats and Beats Music ===
Jackson, Iovine and Dr. Dre launched Beats, the consumer audio manufacturer, together in 2006. While living in New York in 2010, Jackson noticed the growing popularity of smartphone use on the subway, and had the idea for Beats to produce audio systems for Beats-branded smartphones in addition to their business manufacturing headphones. This idea developed into a partnership with smartphone manufacturer HTC, which invested in Beats and produced phones which were branded "powered by Beats". Jackson and Iovine later created Beats Music, a subscription streaming service which launched in 2013, and helped to create its algorithm with Adam Bly.

=== Apple Music ===
After Beats' acquisition by Apple Inc. in May 2014, Jackson, Iovine and Dr. Dre moved to Apple Music. Jackson has been described as helping to lead the launch and rebranding of Apple Music by developing the streaming platform into a full service music brand and promoter.

Jackson wanted Apple Music to develop closer relationships with artists, more comparable to record labels than traditional music distributors. He compared this strategy to "MTV in its Eighties and Nineties heyday." The platform also launched the Beats 1 radio station with DJ Zane Lowe.

Under Jackson, Apple signed an exclusive deal for early releases from Canadian artist Drake as part of a larger multimedia deal in 2015. Drake's 2016 album Views was promoted through Beats 1, OVO Sound radio and other Apple platforms, reaching over 1 billion streams as of September 2016. Drake's 2017 album More Life broke the record for highest number of streams within its first week after release. Jackson also co-wrote the accompanying short film ‘’Please Forgive Me’’ for Views.

The platform subsequently signed exclusive deals with Nicki Minaj, The Weeknd, Frank Ocean, Travis Scott, DJ Khaled, Birdman, Chance the Rapper and Taylor Swift.

As head of content at Apple Music, Jackson also oversaw the production of music videos, advertisements and documentaries. In 2016, he collaborated with Taylor Swift and director Anthony Mandler on an ad campaign showcasing music from different artists on the platform. Streams of "Jumpman" by Drake and Future increased by 431% after it was featured in a spot, and the ads were subsequently aired on networks such as CBS, ABC, ESPN, NBC and Fox.

=== Gamma ===
In March 2023, Jackson launched Gamma (stylized as gamma.) a company that produces and distributes multimedia content, with a special focus on Black music and culture. Jackson has stated his intention to promote diversity, equity and inclusion through Gamma and "to run Gamma with a closer focus on — and more sensitivity to — Black culture than the major labels, while structuring deals that help artists retain ownership of their work and build generational wealth."

The company launched with US$1 billion of capital from billionaire investors like Todd Boehly and Apple, Inc.

Gamma competes with major music labels, and acquired the technology platform Vydia in 2022 to facilitate its distribution of music and other media.

The company has signed artists including Usher, Rick Ross, Snoop Dogg, Sexyy Red, French Montana, and Kanye West. Ross and Maybach Music Group announced a partnership with Gamma in 2023.

=== Other ===
Jackson joined the board of the Hammer Museum at University of California, Los Angeles in 2019.

== Recognition ==
Jackson is considered to be one of the most influential figures in the modern media industry. Matthias Rosenzweig of VMan wrote that he "shaped a great deal of the music you, your parents, and even your kids will hear in their lifetimes."Billboard included Jackson on its "40 under 40" list, and the "Power 100" list. He is a Cartier ambassador.

=== In popular culture ===
Jackson is referenced in Drake's verse on the Lil Wayne song "Family Feud", in which he raps "Someone get Larry Jackson on the phone, I need some ownership if we pressin’ go."

== Awards ==
- Clio Award – 2016
- Grammy Award for Best R&B Album – 2009
