= I Look to You (song) =

2009 single by Whitney Houston

- Remixes single cover

Single by Whitney Houston

from the album I Look to You
- B-side: "Million Dollar Bill"
- Released: July 23, 2009
- Recorded: 2009
- Studio: Chalice Recording Studios (Los Angeles, California); The Boom Boom Room (Burbank, California); Studio at the Palms (Las Vegas, Nevada)
- Genre: Gospel; pop; soul; R&B
- Length: 4:26
- Label: Arista
- Songwriter: Robert Kelly
- Producers: Emanuel Kiriakou; Harvey Mason Jr.; Tricky Stewart

Whitney Houston singles chronology
"One Wish (for Christmas)" (2003)	"I Look to You" (2009)	"Million Dollar Bill" (2009)

Music video
- "I Look To You" on YouTube

"I Look to You" is a pop-soul song recorded by American singer Whitney Houston, from her seventh and final studio album of the same name. It became the first single released from the album in the United States in July 2009, becoming her first official single release in nearly six years and was issued as a promotional single outside the country.

The song had originally been written for Houston by American singer-songwriter R. Kelly back in 1996, but was held from being sent for numerous years until 2008 when Houston began seeking for music to record. The song was produced by Emanuel Kiriakou, Tricky Stewart, and Harvey Mason Jr.

Upon its release, it became a multi-format hit in the United States, producing her best chart results on Billboard since 2001, becoming her 30th top 20 hit on the R&B charts and produced her best chart peak with a new song on the Billboard Hot 100 since 2000, reaching a peak of 70 while also finding chart success on the adult contemporary, dance, jazz and gospel charts, later peaking at number one on the Billboard Gospel Digital Song Sales chart, just days after Houston's death in 2012. It has since been certified platinum by the Recording Industry Association of America for sales of a million copies in the United States, becoming one of the singer's 22 platinum singles in the country.

On February 18, 2012, R. Kelly (who wrote "I Look to You") performed the song at Houston's homegoing at New Hope Baptist Church in Newark, New Jersey. The service was broadcast and streamed live to a worldwide audience. Kelly later recorded and released a posthumous duet with Houston with the song, which also became a number one hit on the Billboard Gospel Digital Song Sales chart.

== Background ==
In 2002, Whitney Houston released her fifth studio album, Just Whitney, which, despite going platinum in the United States was a more moderate commercial success compared to her previous album, My Love Is Your Love (1998). The album was also the first in which it was not helmed by Houston's longtime mentor Clive Davis, who left Arista Records in 2000. Houston's music career had by then become overshadowed by stories of substance abuse and a torrid marriage to singer Bobby Brown.

Following the release of Just Whitney and the holiday release, One Wish: The Holiday Album (2003), Houston took a self-styled sabbatical from the music industry to deal with personal issues. In 2007, after nearly 15 years of marriage, Houston had divorced Brown and relocated to Laguna Hills, California, where she focused on sobriety and dealing with long-standing vocal issues with voice teacher Gary Catona.

By then, Davis had reunited with Houston after becoming the head of RCA Music Group, which housed Arista, J Records and LaFace Records, and the two began assembling music for the latter's next album with recording sessions first taking place in 2008.

== Recording and composition ==
Back in 1996, Houston had been working on the soundtrack of her film, The Preacher's Wife, which was mainly a collection of gospel songs. Around this time, R. Kelly had tried to send a song to Arista's office in Manhattan called "I Look to You" directly for Houston to record but was told that she wouldn't be able to record the song due to having finished working on her soundtrack. Kelly later played the song during an MTV interview in 2000.

It wouldn't be until 2008 that Houston would hear Kelly's demo of the song after Harvey Mason Jr. sent it to her to pick songs for her album. Houston agreed to record the song, later deciding to name her new album after the song. The singer later stated that the song "resounds in my soul. It set the tone for the album as far as what I wanted to say. It’s a very powerful song — I listen to it and it gives me strength and courage."

Houston recorded the song in Los Angeles after plans to have Kelly produce the track himself with Houston in Chicago fell through. Houston also contributed background vocals on the song.

"I Look to You" is a pop, soul and gospel song about finding strength through adversity from a higher power. According to Universal Music Publishing, the song starts at E major and has a "power ballad" tempo with a metronome of 52 beats per minute. It follows a chord progression of E_{5}-E5/D#-Cm_{7}-E/G#-Fm_{11}-Asus2-Bsus-B/D#.

== Song launch ==
Initially Vibe magazine reported that another song titled "I Didn't Know My Own Strength" penned by Diane Warren and produced by David Foster would be released as the lead single. However, on July 14, 21 and 23 Houston held 3 pre-release album listening parties in which 9 of the 11 songs where previewed, "Call You Tonight" was described as a possible lead single by mentor Clive Davis.

Swizz Beatz, producer of the song "Million Dollar Bill" (written by Alicia Keys) said that his record was definitely a potential comeback record and with critical acclaim at all three parties it was widely expected that the song would succeed the others as the lead single.

However both Rap-Up and Houston's official website confirmed the title song would be the first US single whilst "Million Dollar Bill" was released as the worldwide lead single (second US single, almost simultaneously with first single). "I Look to You" was the second single from the album in the United Kingdom, where it was released on December 14, 2009.

== Music video ==
The video for "I Look to You" premiered on September 10, 2009 on Whitney Houston's official website and on Entertainment Tonight.

The video, also directed by Melina Matsoukas, features the singer in front of a plain beige and gray backdrop with different angles of her. She is sitting on an apple box with a spotlight focused on her.

Toward the end of the video, a shower of flowers are shown falling all around her. Houston is wearing a white dress in mood of the beige and grey background.

== Live performances ==
Houston first performed the song at Good Morning America on September 1, 2009, with the show being aired the following day. During the performance, Houston tearfully sang part of the song directly to her mother Cissy Houston, who was in the audience, thanking her for "standing by" her. Houston also performed the song on the German television Wetten, dass..? where she received critical praise for her soulful performance.

Houston included the song on her setlist for the Nothing but Love World Tour (2010) after two 2009 rehearsal shows in December 2009 at Moscow, Russia and Saint Petersburg, Russia. During the performances of the song, Houston dedicated the song to her fans.

On January 30, 2011, Houston would surprise the audience at the 2nd annual BET Celebration of Gospel gala by performing the song as a duet with Kim Burrell after Burrell began the song. Houston sang the second verse without introduction and elicited a standing ovation from the audience. The performance was acclaimed as the best performance of the night. It's notable as Houston's final television performance prior to her death the following year.

== Critical reception ==
Houston said that the powerful piano ballad sums up the album and was all she wanted to say at that stage of her life. From the album parties Rolling Stone said that with the two tracks from R. Kelly (the chippy kiss-off "Salute" and the steely title track produced by Tricky Stewart, Emanuel Kiriakou and Harvey Mason Jr.) Houston seemed to be aiming for a younger audience and the radio. Billboard magazine's Mark Surtherland wrote "The overall feel of the album was notably contemporary, while retaining Houston's trademark vocal flourishes. Clive Davis praised Houston by saying that on songs like "I Look to You" it is not difficult to say she is 'the premium balladeer of our time'.

Billboard's Monica Herrera gave the song a positive review, writing that Houston is "both vulnerable and in control". She adds that "the minimalist production, which features a lone, sullen piano and soft synths, exists purely to cushion Houston's moving vocal performance". Lastly, she stated that it "stands firmly in the tradition of her most emotive hits ("Greatest Love of All," "I Will Always Love You") and signals the long-awaited return of a true diva".

== Commercial performance ==
The song entered the Billboard Hot 100 at number 74 on August 22, 2009, becoming her first single to chart on the Hot 100 since her 2003 single "Try It on My Own" peaked at number 80. In its fourth week on the chart for the week of September 19, the song reached its peak of 70 after having dropped to number 98 the previous week, producing her best chart position since 2001 and her best chart showing of a new single since 2000. In that same week, her dance single "Million Dollar Bill" entered the same chart at number 100, marking the first time since 1999 that Houston had simultaneously charted with two singles on the Hot 100. It became her penultimate entry on the chart, spending a total of six weeks on the chart and becoming her 38th entry, marking a 25-year chart span.

The song also did well on the Hot R&B/Hip-Hop Songs chart, first entering the chart on August 8, 2009 at number 27, becoming her first top 40 R&B hit since "One of Those Days" in 2003. For the week of August 22, the song reached its peak of number 19, marking her first top 20 single since "Same Script, Different Cast" peaked at 14 in 2000 and was Houston's career 30th top 20 single on the chart, eventually spending a total of 20 cumulative weeks on the chart. In the same week, "Million Dollar Bill" debuted on that chart at number 71, marking the first time Houston had two songs chart simultaneously on that chart since 1999. On the Adult R&B Songs chart, it entered the chart in the same week it entered the Hot R&B/Hip-Hop Songs chart at number 23, as the chart's "Greatest Gainer" of the week. Nine weeks later, it reached a peak of number two in the week of October 3, 2009, becoming her twelfth top ten entry on the chart.

The song also reached the top 40 in other Billboard charts, peaking at number 22 on the Adult Contemporary chart, number 35 on the Hot Dance Club Songs chart, number 21 on the Smooth Hot Jazz Songs chart and number 14 on the Hot Gospel Songs chart, becoming her first entries on the latter two charts while it became her 32nd career entry on the adult contemporary chart and her first AC entry since "One Wish (for Christmas)" peaked at number 20 in January 2004. The song also entered the Gospel Digital Song Sales chart at number 3 for the week of January 23, 2010. Upon Houston's passing, the song re-entered the chart for the week of February 25, 2012, peaking at number one on the chart, becoming Houston's first posthumous Billboard number one single. It would remain at the top of the chart for six straight weeks. On the same chart, Houston simultaneously charted five songs in the top five of the same chart. On the Gospel Streaming Songs chart, it peaked at number three for the week of February 22, 2015. Following Dylan Carter's performance of the song on The Voice in October 2023, the song re-entered the Gospel Digital Song Sales chart at number 2 for the week of October 28, 2023, accumulating 92 weeks on the chart. That week, it returned to the Hot R&B/Hip-Hop Digital Song Sales chart where it reached a new peak of number 12.

In Canada, it peaked at number 68 on its official chart while peaking at number 34 on its AC singles chart.

In Europe, the song achieved moderate chart success, peaking at number 115 in the United Kingdom, with the song's release being overshadowed by the success of "Million Dollar Bill", which was a top five hit there. In Austria, it reached number 47 and peaked at number 41 in Germany as a double-sided single with "Million Dollar Bill". It reached the top 40 of Belgium's Ultratip charts in Wallonia and Flanders. It reached a peak of 33 in Sweden and 16 in Switzerland. In France, it reached a peak of number 124, doing so posthumously. In Asia, it peaked at number 16 on South Korea's Circle international singles chart. On the Billboard Brazil charts, it reached number one, its most successful international showing outside the US.

In May 2012, it was reported that the song had sold around 300,000 physical copies in the US while selling more than 550,000 physical copies worldwide. In January 2023, nearly 14 years after its release, the song was certified platinum by the RIAA for sales of over a million copies in the United States, becoming one of Houston's 22 platinum singles in the country and made her one of the few recording artists to have a platinum single for four or more decades in the country. It was the penultimate single of her lifetime to achieve this. It was the 21st best-selling adult R&B single of 2009 as well as the 87th best-selling single on the R&B/hip-hop singles chart.

== Cover versions ==
- The song was covered on the television show Glee during the second-season episode "Grilled Cheesus". With Amber Riley on lead vocals, the song debuted and peaked at #74 on the Hot 100 during the week of October 23, 2010.
- On February 18, 2012, singer/songwriter R. Kelly (who wrote "I Look to You") performed the song at Houston's funeral at New Hope Baptist Church in Newark, New Jersey. The service was broadcast and streamed live to a worldwide audience.
- The song is covered by Selah on their fourth album, Hope of the Broken World, which was released in 2011.
- The song was also covered by English singer-songwriter Joe McElderry featuring London Community Gospel Choir on his fourth studio album Here's What I Believe.
- The song was covered on the NBC television show Zoey's Extraordinary Playlist, during season 2, episode 10 "Zoey's Extraordinary Girls' Night" performed by Alex Newell. The episode aired on April 18, 2021.
- On October 16, 2023, country singer Dylan Carter covered the song while as a contestant on The Voice as an emotional tribute to his late mother, which led to all of the judges on the show to react emotionally to the song.

== Track listing ==
Digital download

1. "I Look to You" – 4:25

German double A-side single

1. "I Look to You" – 4:25
2. "Million Dollar Bill" – 3:24

UK digital single

1. "I Look to You" – 4:25
2. "I Look to You" (Giuseppe D. Club Mix) – 7:39
3. "I Look to You" (Johnny Vicious Warehouse Club Mix) – 8:52
4. "I Look to You" (Johnny Vicious Club Mix) – 9:08
5. "I Look to You" (Christian Dio Club Mix) – 7:53

UK digital remix EP

1. "I Look to You" (Johnny Vicious Warehouse Radio Mix) – 4:08
2. "I Look to You" (Johnny Vicious Warehouse Club Mix) – 8:52
3. "I Look to You" (Johnny Vicious Warehouse Mixshow) – 5:50
4. "I Look to You" (Johnny Vicious Radio Mix) – 3:52
5. "I Look to You" (Johnny Vicious Mixshow) – 6:06
6. "I Look to You" (Johnny Vicious Club Mix) – 9:08
7. "I Look to You" (Christian Dio Radio Mix) – 4:01
8. "I Look to You" (Christian Dio Mixshow) – 5:51
9. "I Look to You" (Christian Dio Club Mix) – 7:53
10. "I Look to You" (Giuseppe D. Radio Edit) – 3:47
11. "I Look to You" (Giuseppe D. Club Mix) – 7:39
12. "I Look to You" (Giuseppe D. Mixshow) – 5:52

Other versions

- 7th Heaven Club Mix - 7:55
- 7th Heaven Radio Edit – 4:10

== Charts and certifications ==
=== Weekly charts ===
Chart (2009–2023)	Peak position
Austria (Ö3 Austria Top 40)	47
Belgium (Ultratip Bubbling Under Flanders)	21
Belgium (Ultratip Bubbling Under Wallonia)	14
Brazil (Billboard Brasil)	1
Canada Hot 100 (Billboard)	68
Canada AC (Billboard)	34
France (SNEP)	124
Germany (GfK) Double A-Side with "Million Dollar Bill"	41
Japan Hot 100 (Billboard)	40
Netherlands (Single Top 100)	65
Quebec (ADISQ)	16
South Korea International (Circle)	16
Sweden (Sverigetopplistan)	33
Switzerland (Schweizer Hitparade)	16
UK Singles (Official Charts Company)	115
US Billboard Hot 100	70
US Adult Contemporary (Billboard)	22
US Adult R&B Songs (Billboard)	2
US Dance Club Songs (Billboard)	35
US Digital Song Sales (Billboard)	68
US Gospel Digital Songs (Billboard)	1
US Hot Gospel Songs (Billboard)	14
US Hot R&B/Hip-Hop Songs (Billboard)	19
US R&B/Hip-Hop Digital Songs (Billboard)	12
US Smooth Jazz Airplay (Billboard)	21
US Top Gospel Streaming Songs (Billboard)	3

=== Year-end charts ===
Chart (2009)	Position
US Adult R&B Songs (Billboard)	21
US Hot R&B/Hip-Hop Songs (Billboard)	87

Chart (2012)	Position
US Gospel Digital Songs (Billboard)	6

Chart (2013)	Position
US Gospel Digital Songs (Billboard)	25

Chart (2014)	Position
US Gospel Streaming Songs (Billboard)	14

Chart (2016)	Position
US Gospel Streaming Songs (Billboard)	18

Chart (2017)	Position
US Gospel Streaming Songs (Billboard)	23

Chart (2018)	Position
US Gospel Streaming Songs (Billboard)	45

=== Certifications ===
Region	Certification	Certified units/sales
United States (RIAA)	Platinum	1,000,000^{‡}
^{‡} Sales+streaming figures based on certification alone.

== Release history ==
Country	Release date	Format	Label
North America	July 23, 2009	Premier/debut	Arista Records, Sony Music
Austria	July 27 until July 31, 2009	Limited free download	Sony Music Entertainment
Germany	July 27 until July 31, 2009	Limited free download	Sony Music Entertainment
Italy	July 27 until July 31, 2009	Limited free download	Sony Music Entertainment
North America	July 27 until July 31, 2009	Limited free download	Arista Records, Sony Music
Spain	July 27 until July 31, 2009	Limited free download	Sony Music Entertainment
Sweden	July 27 until July 31, 2009	Limited free download	Sony Music Entertainment
United States	August 11, 2009	Airplay	Arista Records
United States	August 4, 2009	Digital download	Arista Records
Germany	October 2, 2009	Double A-side Single	Sony Music Entertainment
United Kingdom	November 6, 2009	Digital Download: Single remix album	RCA Records
United Kingdom	December 14, 2009	Digital Download: 5-track single	RCA Records

== Accolades ==
Year	Region	Award	Category	Result
2010	United States	NAACP Image Awards	Outstanding Music Video	Won

== Duet version with R. Kelly ==
"I Look to You"

Single by Whitney Houston and R. Kelly

from the album I Will Always Love You: The Best of Whitney Houston
- Released: September 25, 2012
- Recorded: 2012
- Studio: The Chocolate Factory (Chicago, IL); Tekzenmusic (Los Angeles, CA)
- Genre: R&B; soul; gospel; pop
- Length: 3:39
- Label: RCA
- Songwriter: Robert Kelly
- Producers: Clive Davis; R. Kelly

Whitney Houston singles chronology
"His Eye Is on the Sparrow" (2012)	"I Look to You" (2012)	"Memories" (2016)

R. Kelly singles chronology
"Feelin' Single" (2012)	"I Look to You" (2012)	"When a Man Lies" (2012)

The song was later re-recorded as a duet between Houston and R. Kelly and was released as a single on September 25, 2012, seven months after Houston's death. This version marks Houston's final single, and third posthumous release. One day before the release, a sneak peek of this version debuted on Ryan Seacrest's website. The duet version of the song was released from and to promote Houston's posthumous compilation album I Will Always Love You: The Best of Whitney Houston. The song was released as the first and only single from the compilation by RCA Records.

It entered and peaked at number 90 on the Hot R&B/Hip-Hop Songs chart for the week of October 13, 2012, becoming Houston's second posthumous hit and her 46th career entry. It reached a peak of 29 on the Adult R&B Songs chart, staying on the chart for 13 weeks, while entering number one on the Gospel Digital Song Sales chart.

=== Track listing ===
Digital download

1. "I Look to You" (Whitney Houston and R. Kelly) — 3:39

=== Chart performance ===
Chart (2012)	Peak position
US Adult R&B Songs (Billboard)	29
US Gospel Digital Songs (Billboard)	1
US Hot R&B/Hip-Hop Songs (Billboard)	90

=== Release history ===
Country	Release date	Format	Label
Worldwide	September 25, 2012	Digital Download	RCA Records
United Kingdom	November 11, 2012	Digital Download	RCA Records

== Accolades ==
Year	Region	Award	Category	Result
2013	United States	NAACP Image Awards	Outstanding Song	Won
