= I Look to You =

Studio album by Whitney Houston
- Released: August 28, 2009
- Studios: Patchwerk (Atlanta); Konkast (Atlanta); Boom Boom Room (Burbank); Chocolate Factory (Chicago); Record Plant (Hollywood); Studio at the Palms (Las Vegas); 1221 (Los Angeles); Hit Factory Criteria (Miami); Germano (New York); Chun King (New York); KMA (New York); OVEN (New York); Roc the Mic (New York); Sterling Sound (New York); Tree Sound (Norcross); Mason Sound (North Hollywood); Soapbox West (San Francisco)
- Genres: Pop; soul; R&B
- Length: 44:29
- Label: Arista
- Producers: Whitney Houston; Clive Davis; Larry King; Alicia Keys; Danja; David Foster; Fernando Garibay; Eric Hudson; Emanuel Kiriakou; Harvey Mason, Jr.; R.Kelly; Stargate; C. "Tricky" Stewart; Swizz Beatz; Giorgio Tuinfort

Whitney Houston chronology
The Ultimate Collection (2007)	I Look to You (2009)	The Collection (2010)

Singles from I Look to You
- 1. "I Look to You" Released: July 23, 2009; 2. "Million Dollar Bill" Released: August 18, 2009

I Look to You is the seventh and final studio album by American singer Whitney Houston. It was first released on August 28, 2009 in Europe, followed by releases in other territories later in 2009. Conceived after years of personal struggles, the album took more than three years to complete and reunited her with longtime mentor Clive Davis, who assembled songwriters and producers such as Alicia Keys, Akon, and R. Kelly. Rather than following musical trends, Houston and Davis focused on timeless songs that highlighted her signature vocal style. Its lyrics reflect themes of faith, recovery, motherhood, perseverance, and personal resilience, making the album a deeply personal comeback statement.

The album was Houston's first non-holiday project since Just Whitney (2002). It received generally favorable reviews, with critics praising Houston's emotional, more mature vocals and the album's themes of resilience and recovery, though many noted that it did not fully match the vocal power or impact of her classic work. I Look to You was a commercial success, debuting atop the US Billboard 200 with 305,000 first-week sales, becoming Houston's first chart-topping album since 1992's The Bodyguard and eventually selling about 3.0 million copies worldwide, reaching number one in several countries, the top ten in many others, and earning numerous Gold and Platinum certifications.

The album produced two commercially successful singles: the title track, "I Look to You," which reached the top 20 of the US Hot R&B/Hip-Hop Songs chart, and "Million Dollar Bill," which served as the album's first international single and achieved top-ten chart positions in several countries while also becoming a top-20 R&B hit in the United States. In support of the album and its accompanying Nothing but Love World Tour, Houston's first major tour in almost a decade, the promotional single "Nothin' but Love" was serviced exclusively to UK radio. Houston's death on February 11, 2012, made I Look to You her final studio album released during her lifetime.

== Background ==
Following the renewal of her recording contract with Arista Records in 2001, Whitney Houston returned to the studio to record Just Whitney (2002), her first studio album in four years. The new six-album, two-compilation agreement, reportedly worth $100 million, marked a significant change in Houston's relationship with the label, as it was negotiated under the leadership of L.A. Reid following the 2000 departure of her longtime mentor and Arista executive Clive Davis, who had subsequently established J Records. Just Whitney, Houston's first album under Reid, was repeatedly delayed before its December 2002 release and became her first project not overseen by Davis. Although it achieved her highest first-week sales at the time, it failed to produce a major hit and was ultimately only a modest commercial success, selling approximately 2.5 million copies worldwide. Its release also coincided with growing public scrutiny of Houston's personal life and well-being, with media attention surrounding her marriage to Bobby Brown, her reported substance use, and concerns about her health increasingly overshadowing promotional efforts for the album. Houston followed it with One Wish: The Holiday Album in 2003, which similarly failed to make a significant commercial impact.

The comparatively modest performance of both releases marked a significant departure from Houston's commercial dominance during the 1980s and 1990s and was followed by a prolonged decline in her recording activity. Following One Wish, Houston largely withdrew from the studio as her personal and professional difficulties continued. After relocating to Georgia with her family, she and Brown continued to attract extensive tabloid and media attention, with coverage focusing on Brown's legal troubles and allegations of domestic abuse, as well as their reality television series Being Bobby Brown, which was filmed in 2004. Houston's prospects for a return to recording began to improve following the 2004 merger of BMG and Sony Music, after which Davis was reinstated as head of the newly formed RCA Music Group, restoring his influence over Arista and Houston's career. He encouraged Houston to address her personal difficulties and resume recording, and arranged sessions with producers including Lil Jon and Bryan-Michael Cox for a planned late-2005 album release. However, two stints in drug rehabilitation, in March 2004 and March 2005, interrupted these plans and delayed her return to the studio. In 2006, Houston entered rehabilitation again, filed for divorce from Brown, and began working with a vocal coach as part of an effort to rebuild her voice.

== Conception ==
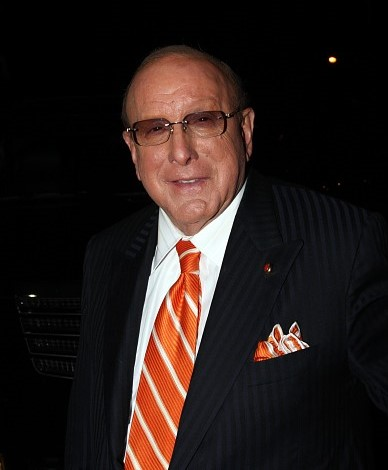
The making of I Look to You reunited Houston with longtime mentor Clive Davis.

The project ultimately took three and a half years to complete. As Houston experienced a series of personal and professional difficulties during the development of what was intended to become her seventh studio album, the project evolved alongside shifting musical trends of the mid-to-late 2000s and underwent several changes before taking shape as I Look to You. By early 2007, Davis had enlisted additional musicians and songwriters to contribute to the project, including Ne-Yo, John Legend, and Harvey Mason, Jr. and Damon Thomas from the production duo The Underdogs, who were brought in to write material for the album. Later that year, Akon confirmed that he had begun working with Houston on songs, despite her initial reservations about collaborating with him. Work on the album continued into 2009. By early that year, Sean Garrett had met with Davis to discuss songs intended for Houston to record. Around the same time, Davis and record executive Larry Jackson also approached Swizz Beatz to contribute to the project, who subsequently enlisted his then-girlfriend and Houston's label mate Alicia Keys to co-write a song for the album. Houston also recorded material with will.i.am for the album, although the songs were ultimately left off the final track listing and remained unreleased.

Houston and Davis worked closely together on the album, assembling a contemporary R&B-oriented sound that retained the vocal and melodic qualities associated with her earlier work rather than attempting to follow prevailing musical trends, while still maintaining a modern sound. Houston regarded her reunion with Davis as a return to a familiar creative partnership, describing their collaboration as a "labor of love" and emphasizing their shared approach to music, particularly their focus on strong lyrics, melodies, and enduring standards. As with their work on Houston's previous albums, Davis encouraged her to concentrate on interpretation rather than songwriting, advising her to write only when she believed she could produce material of exceptional quality. This approach also suited Houston's circumstances at the time. After relocating from Georgia to Los Angeles, she had largely focused on raising her teenage daughter, Bobbi Kristina, and settled into a quieter domestic routine in Laguna Hills, where she spent more time at home. Nevertheless, Davis and the album's producers maintained high standards throughout the recording process, often asking Houston to revisit performances and record additional takes, despite her preference for completing songs within a few minutes and with minimal takes, sometimes requiring them to persuade her to spend more time refining her performances.

Curated through a series of individual recording sessions that continued late into production, I Look to You gradually took shape, although Houston initially remained uncertain whether the material had established the cohesive overall direction she was seeking. The recording of Swizz Beatz's "Million Dollar Bill," the final song completed for the album, marked a turning point, with Houston regarding the track as one of its more light-hearted moments and recognizing it as an indication that the project was coming together. Although Houston enjoyed revisiting uptempo styles on the album, she continued to identify primarily as a ballad singer on I Look to You and viewed it as an extension of the gospel tradition that had shaped her vocal style, particularly on songs such as "Nothin' But Love" and "I Didn't Know My Own Strength." Lyrically, she described the album as reflecting the experiences and emotions she had encountered since her previous studio album in 2002, including personal changes, transitions, motherhood, and becoming a single mother. She characterized the material as incorporating both the positive and difficult experiences of the preceding years, with themes of faith, perseverance, and personal resilience informing the album. Reflecting its emphasis on overcoming adversity, the project was tentatively titled Undefeated during its development before ultimately being released as I Look to You.

== Music ==
"Million Dollar Bill" (2009)
The second single from I Look to You. The disco song, which samples Loleatta Holloway's "We're Getting Stronger (The Longer We Stay Together)", became Houston's thirteenth Hot Dance Club Play topper.

The album opens with "Million Dollar Bill," an uptempo disco and R&B track built around a sample of Loleatta Holloway's 1977 song "We're Getting Stronger." Its production, featuring a rhythm-driven beat and prominent percussion, was noted for its old-school R&B character rather than the hip-hop-oriented sound often associated with Swizz Beatz's productions. Houston described the recording process as "the most fun" she had while making the album, while critics noted its blend of R&B and a "club-friendly beat." "Nothin' But Love", produced by Nathaniel "Danja" Hills and Fernando Garibay, is an uptempo, danceable track driven by a propulsive hand-clapping rhythm and was described as suitable for urban radio. Houston identified the song as "key song" of the album's central message, with its title reflecting her perspective of moving beyond past difficulties without bitterness and approaching the future with love. Hills also produced on "For the Lovers."

"Call You Tonight," a mid-tempo R&B song featuring Norwegian production team Stargate's "trademark guitar riffs" characteristics, is one of two songs written by Johntá Austin penned for I Look to You. "Worth It," produced by Eric Hudson and written by Austin, takes a similarly mid-tempo approach. "Like I Never Left" was one of two songs recorded by Akon with Houston during the album's development. At Houston's request, the song incorporates an "island feel"-inspired sound, and was reportedly considered both as a potential single and as a possible title for the album. The song's style was compared to Janet Jackson's "My Baby" from her 2004 album Damita Jo. The title track, "I Look to You," is a piano-led ballad that serves as the album's emotional centerpiece. Written by R. Kelly, the song was released as the album's lead single and was described by Houston as encapsulating what she wanted to express through the record. Recalling its recording, Houston said she was initially drawn to the song's concise structure, but that Kelly subsequently completed an additional verse and bridge with her in the studio. The album also includes "Salute," an R&B song built around a militaristic marching rhythm, with Kelly contributing backing vocals to the chorus. Its lyrics include a reference to LL Cool J's "Mama Said Knock You Out." The closing portion of the album places greater emphasis on traditional soul and gospel-influenced vocal arrangements. Houston's interpretation of Leon Russell's 1970s song "A Song for You" begins with a sparse piano introduction before developing into a fuller arrangement. The song was also remixed with a dance-oriented, club-influenced production, presenting the ballad in a more rhythmic setting.

== Release and promotion ==
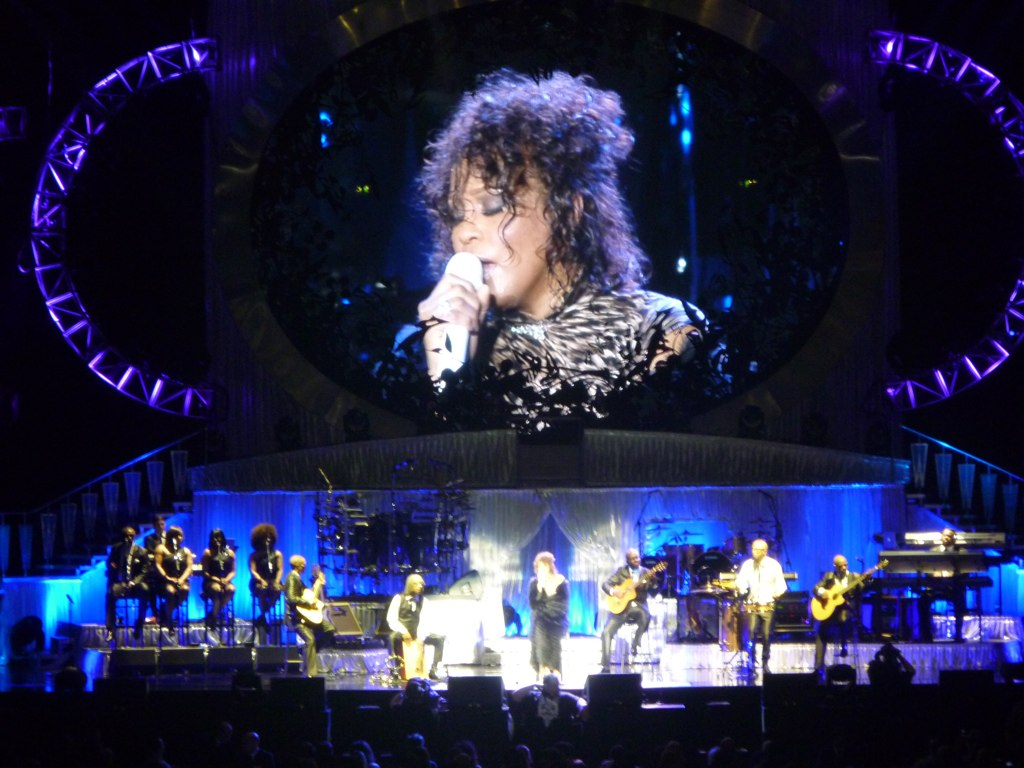
Houston performing at the Mediolanum Forum in Milan during the Nothing but Love World Tour in 2010

Promotion for the album began in July 2009 with a series of high-profile listening parties in London, New York City, and Beverly Hills, where Houston previewed several tracks from the album and received standing ovations from attendees. The first event was held on July 14 at the Mandarin Oriental Hotel in London and was hosted by Clive Davis. Nine songs were previewed, including "Million Dollar Bill," "I Didn't Know My Own Strength," "I Look to You," and "A Song for You." Additional listening sessions were held on July 21 at the Allen Room in New York City's Lincoln Center and on July 23 at The Beverly Hilton in Beverly Hills, both attracting prominent figures from the music and entertainment industries and receiving similarly enthusiastic receptions.

Following the album's release, Houston embarked on an extensive promotional campaign across television and international media. On September 2, 2009, she headlined Good Morning America's "Fall Concerts;" performing the singles "Million Dollar Bill" and "I Look to You" alongside earlier hits "I'm Every Woman" and "My Love Is Your Love." Later that month, Houston sat down with Oprah Winfrey for a highly publicized two-part interview on The Oprah Winfrey Show, which aired on September 14 and 15 and featured a live performance of "I Didn't Know My Own Strength". Widely regarded as one of the most candid interviews of her career, the special was praised by Winfrey as the best interview she had ever conducted.

Houston continued promoting the album throughout Europe, appearing on German television show Wetten Dass on October 3, 2009, and later on Le Grand Journal in France to perform "Million Dollar Bill." On October 18, Houston performed the same song live on The X Factor, marking her first UK performance in over a decade. She also performed the single live on The X Factor in Italy. On November 22, 2009, Houston performed "I Didn't Know My Own Strength" at the 2009 American Music Awards in Los Angeles, which earned her a standing ovation. Amid the promotional campaign, Houston announced on October 12, 2009, via her official website that she would embark on her first world tour in over ten years, the Nothing but Love World Tour, in support of I Look to You. The tour began on December 9, 2009, in Russia with further dates including Germany, Switzerland, Austria, Belgium, Italy, and Australia.

== Singles ==
The album was preceded by the release of its title track, "I Look to You," which served as the lead single in the United States and was later issued as the album's second international single. Written by R. Kelly, who had originally composed the song for Houston a decade earlier, "I Look to You" achieved moderate success, reaching number 70 on the US Billboard Hot 100 while also charting within the top 30 of the Adult Contemporary chart and the top 20 of both the Hot R&B/Hip-Hop Songs and Gospel charts in the United States. Internationally, the single received a mixed commercial response, peaking at number 16 in Switzerland but reaching only number 115 in the United Kingdom.

The album's second US single and first international single, "Million Dollar Bill," reached number 100 on the Billboard Hot 100 and peaked within the top 20 of the Hot R&B/Hip-Hop Songs chart. It also topped both the Hot Dance Club Songs and Adult R&B Songs charts. Internationally, "Million Dollar Bill" enjoyed greater success, reaching number five on the UK Singles Chart, aided by promotion of the Freemasons remix and becoming Houston's first top-five hit in the country in a decade. The song also peaked at number 15 on the European Hot 100 Singles chart, marking Houston's thirtieth and final appearance on the chart and her highest placement there in nine years.

Following the popularity of the dance remix B-sides appearing on the UK CD release of "Million Dollar Bill", a number of remix EPs were released. "I Look to You – The Remixes" was released on November 6, 2009, in the US and UK, featuring 12 dance remixes of the first single "I Look to You". Also released in the UK and US on November 6, 2009, were "The Remixes", featuring remixes of "I Look to You", "I Didn't Know My Own Strength", and "Million Dollar Bill". This was followed by the final remix EP being released on November 6, 2009, called "I Didn't Know My Own Strength Remixes", which was released in the US and UK.

=== Other charted songs ===
The ballad, "I Didn't Know My Own Strength", written by Diane Warren, peaked at number 17 on the US Hot Dance Club Songs chart after a remix was released as a bonus track on the US iTunes version of the album. Later, following Houston's performance on The Oprah Winfrey Show, it appeared at number 61 on the US Hot R&B/Hip-Hop Songs chart. Internationally the song peaked at number 38 and number 44 in Ireland and the United Kingdom respectively following its performance by Danyl Johnson, one of the finalists on the sixth series of The X Factor. It also charted on the Japan Hot 100 at number 16. Another song, "Nothin' But Love" was sent to UK radio stations as a promotional single to coincide with the Nothing But Love World Tour. It reached the A-list on BBC Radio 2. Meanwhile, "Worth It" debuted on the Korean International Singles Chart at number 182 before eventually peaking at number 56 and number 61 on US Hot R&B/Hip Hop Songs chart.

== Critical reception ==
Professional ratings
Aggregate scores
Source	Rating
Metacritic	66/100
Review scores
Source	Rating
AllMusic	3/5 stars
Entertainment Weekly	B−
Evening Standard	4/5 stars
The Guardian	3/5 stars
Los Angeles Times	3/4 stars
Now	4/5 Ns
Slant Magazine	3/5 stars
Q	3/5 stars
Rolling Stone	3.5/5 stars
USA Today	3.5/4 stars

Critical response to I Look to You was generally positive, with reviewers often regarding it as a successful but imperfect comeback. On Metacritic, the album received a score of 66 out of 100, indicating "generally favorable reviews," based on 15 reviews. Several critics praised Houston's ability to adapt her changed voice to contemporary production while emphasizing themes of resilience and renewal. Steve Jones of USA Today called it her "best since 1998's My Love Is Your Love" and wrote that she "clearly hasn't forgotten how to sing." Rolling Stone critic Jody Rosen characterized it as a modern soul album rather than a nostalgia-driven comeback, describing "I Didn't Know My Own Strength" as its defining "Big Whitney Moment." He noted that Houston's voice had become "huskier" and "less powerful but more sultry," a quality he felt suited her mature approach. Ann Powers, writing for Los Angeles Times, similarly called the album "an effective set," writing that "operating within limits becomes the album's overriding theme" and praising the expressive quality of Houston's weathered vocals. Pete Clark of the Evening Standard likewise praised the album, calling it "a sumptuous showcase for a terrific voice."

Other favorable reviews emphasized maturity and vocal vulnerability. Writing for Now, called it "a strong soul album by a mature singer," arguing that Houston's rougher vocals added "a sense of vulnerability" to the polished R&B production. Alexis Petridis of The Guardian noted that her vocals were "rougher" but argued that this was "not always a problem," praising the album's stylish combination of pop-soul, catchy melodies and "eurodisco thump." Jon Pareles of The New York Times likewise highlighted Houston's "thicker and lower" voice as a source of vulnerability, while Nick Levine of Digital Spy called it an "accomplished, enjoyable return," praising its contemporary production and Houston's more weathered vocal tone. Critics also praised the album's production and ability to update Houston's established sound. Billboard's Gail Mitchell highlighted her "assured, distinctive vocals" and "gospel-honed voice," while Houston Chronicle critic Joey Guerra described the album as "an accessible, elegant and entertaining" collection of pop-soul, ballads and R&B. Andy Gill of The Independent praised Houston's "aplomb and restraint," while Gavin Martin of The Mirror called the record a "credible return" and argued that her changed voice made her "more human." Helen Brown of The Daily Telegraph described it as a "slick enough" adult R&B album, noting that Houston's voice was now "deeper, huskier and rather more soulful."

Lauren Carter of the Boston Herald praised I Look to You's contemporary production but felt Houston's diminished vocals made it favor "safety" over her earlier power. Jenny Mayo of The Washington Times similarly described it as "a fine moment" while noting that it lacked the impact of Houston's classic work. The Times called it a "solid if not spectacular" comeback, while Stephen Thomas Erlewine of AllMusic praised Houston's emotional delivery but considered the album less distinctive than her strongest work. Critics including Ashante Infantry of the Toronto Star, Glenn Gamboa of Newsday and Jim Farber of the New York Daily News similarly acknowledged the loss of her former vocal power while finding merit in the material and production. The album's treatment of Houston's personal history drew sharper criticism, with Kitty Empire of The Observer describing it as a combination of "Noughties A-list production" and "consolatory generalisations." She argued that it offered little genuinely personal insight and that Houston's once "golden pipes" had become worn and cracked. Entertainment Weekly's Leah Greenblatt likewise praised the emotional weight of her huskier voice but criticized the lack of insight into her struggles. Slant Magazine critic Sal Cinquemani was more critical of her diminished vocal technique, although he argued that her altered voice worked effectively in the album's midtempo material. The most negative assessments questioned whether the album restored Houston's former stature, with Jermaine Hall of Vibe calling it "scarily mediocre," arguing that her diminished vocals prevented it from matching her earlier work. Nevertheless, he praised some of its upbeat material and concluded that listeners seeking "vintage Houston" would be better served by her greatest-hits recordings.

=== Accolades ===
Houston received several awards and nominations during promotion of the album. In November 2009, Houston accepted the Artist of Excellence Award, partially due to the international success of the album as well as her global success achieved throughout her career. It was her 22nd and final American Music Award win of her career. At the 2009 Soul Train Music Awards, Houston was nominated for the Best R&B/Soul Artist — Female category.

In January 2010, Houston was honored at the BET Honors with the BET Honor for Entertainment, which celebrated her 25th anniversary in show business and music. During the same ceremony, Houston received an award certification plaque from her record label after I Look to You surpassed the two-million global mark.

Houston also received two NAACP Image Awards nominations at the 41st NAACP Image Awards, winning one for Outstanding Music Video for the "I Look to You" music video. Three years later, the same song won the NAACP Image Award for Outstanding Song. At the Echo Awards in Germany, Houston received the nomination for Künstlerin International Rock/Pop (Best International Rock/Pop Artist ― Female).

== Commercial performance ==
I Look to You debuted at number one on the US Billboard 200 with sales of 305,000 copies, easily beating pre-release expectations of 250,000 to 270,000 and representing Houston's best opening week sales during the Nielsen SoundScan era. The album is Houston's fourth number one album overall – her first number one album since The Bodyguard (1992) and her first number one debut since Whitney (1987). The album also debuted at number one on the US R&B/Hip-Hop Albums chart and the US Digital Albums chart.

Sales spiked with Houston's high-profile appearance on The Oprah Winfrey Show on September 14–15, 2009, returning the album to the number two position in its third week of release with 156,000 copies sold. I Look to You spent a total of 39 weeks on the US Billboard 200, including four weeks in the top ten. On December 1, 2009, the album was certified platinum by the RIAA for shipping one million copies, finishing the year as the 29th biggest selling album of 2009 in the United States and ranking Houston among the top ten female artists in the US Billboard 200. Additionally, I Look to You was the 9th best selling US R&B/Hip-Hop album of 2009, having spent 11 weeks in the top ten for the R&B chart. Her overall success on the R&B/Hip-Hop chart that year made her the seventh best-selling female artist of the year and 24th best-selling R&B artist overall as well as the ninth best-selling R&B albums artist.

Internationally, I Look to You debuted at number one in Canada (10,000 copies), Germany, Italy, The Netherlands, Poland, and Switzerland, and at number three in the UK (51,632 copies), France (19,000 copies), and Spain. In Korea the album reached number one on the monthly chart and sold 12,429 copies. According to Houston's official website, the album and singles combined have sold a total of 500,000 copies in the UK and Ireland. The 2.5 million copies sold worldwide for I Look to You made it the 19th biggest selling album globally in 2009, outperforming other high-profile albums released that year, such as Miley Cyrus' Hannah Montana movie soundtrack (2.46 million), Jay-Z's The Blueprint 3 (2.4 million), John Mayer's Battle Studies (2.28 million), and Madonna's compilation album Celebration (2.26 million).

== Legacy ==
In his 2024 retrospective review of the album, Mark Chappelle of the site Albumism wrote that the album helped Houston "rise from beneath a decade of ashes" of tabloid journalism and the "greatly underwhelm[ing]" reception of her previous non-holiday studio effort, Just Whitney, and that her recording of "I Didn't Know My Own Strength" in particular was a "triumphant ballad" that was followed by Houston's performance of the song on the Oprah Winfrey Show, arguing that the performance "went a long way to repair damage done during her disastrous Diane Sawyer interview in 2002."

Chappelle added that the album was "equal parts celebration and lamentation" that "gather[ed] Houston’s powers for a festival of urban AC pop-soul to toast her supporters one last time."

In 2026, Revolt included the album in their list of "Top 15 Final Albums Black Music Legends Gave the World Before Saying Goodbye", writing that the album was "both a powerful comeback and, heartbreakingly, her final full-length statement."

== Track listing ==
I Look to You
No.	Title	Writer(s)	Producer(s)	Length
1.	"Million Dollar Bill"	Alicia Keys; Kasseem Dean; Norman Harris	Swizz Beatz; Keys^{[a]}	3:24
2.	"Nothin' But Love"	Fernando Garibay; Franne Golde; Kasia Livingston; Nathaniel Hills	Danja; Garibay; Harvey Mason Jr.^{[b]}	3:35
3.	"Call You Tonight"	Johntá Austin; Tor Erik Hermansen; Mikkel S. Eriksen	Stargate	4:08
4.	"I Look to You"	R. Kelly	C. "Tricky" Stewart; Mason, Jr.; Emanuel Kiriakou	4:25
5.	"Like I Never Left" (featuring Akon)	Whitney Houston; Aliaune "Akon" Thiam; Giorgio Tuinfort; Claude Kelly	Akon; Mason Jr.^{[a]}; Tuinfort^{[c]}	3:49
6.	"A Song for You"	Leon Russell	Stargate; Mason, Jr.^{[b]}	4:11
7.	"I Didn't Know My Own Strength"	Diane Warren	David Foster	3:40
8.	"Worth It"	Austin; Eric Hudson	Hudson; Mason, Jr.^{[b]}	4:39
9.	"For the Lovers"	Hills; C. Kelly; Marcella Araica	Danja; Kelly^{[b]}	4:14
10.	"I Got You"	Houston; Thiam; Tuinfort; C. Kelly	Akon; C. Kelly^{[b]}; Tuinfort^{[c]}	4:12
11.	"Salute"	R. Kelly	R. Kelly; Mason, Jr.^{[b]}	4:10
Total length:				44:47

US iTunes pre-order bonus track
No.	Title	Writer(s)	Producer	Length
12.	"I Didn't Know My Own Strength" (Club Remix)	Warren	Peter Rauhofer	7:42

Japan bonus track
No.	Title	Writer(s)	Producer(s)	Length
12.	"I Didn't Know My Own Strength" (Daddy's Groove Magic Island Radio Mix)	Warren	Peppe Folliero; Carlo Grieco; Gianni Romano	3:11

I Look to You - The Remixes
No.	Title	Length
1.	"Million Dollar Bill" (Freemasons Radio Mix)	3:48
2.	"Million Dollar Bill" (Frankie Knuckles Radio Mix)	3:15
3.	"I Look to You" (Johnny Vicious Warehouse Radio Mix)	4:07
4.	"I Look to You" (Johnny Vicious Club Radio Mix)	3:52
5.	"I Didn't Know My Own Strength" (Peter Rauhofer Radio Edit)	3:04
6.	"I Didn't Know My Own Strength" (Daddy's Groove Magic Island Radio Mix)	3:15
7.	"I Look to You" (Christian Dio Radio Mix)	4:00
8.	"I Look to You" (Giuseppe D. Radio Mix)	3:50

Notes

- "Million Dollar Bill" contains a sample from "We're Getting Stronger", written by Allan Felder, Norman Harris and Ronald Tyson, as performed by Loleatta Holloway.
- "A Song for You" is a cover of the original song by Leon Russell.
- ^{^[a]} also a vocal producer
- ^{^[b]} vocal producer
- ^{^[c]} co-producer
- Unless noted otherwise or not credited, all vocal production handled by Harvey Mason, Jr.

== Personnel and credits ==
=== Personnel ===
- Marcella "Ms. Lago" Araica – mixing
- Christian Baker – assistant
- Adam Beyrer – additional instrument recording engineer (track 2)
- Courtney Blooding – background vocals
- Anita Marisa Boriboon – art direction and design
- Clive Davis – executive producer, A&R
- Michael Daley – assistant vocal engineer
- Kaseem "Swizz Beatz" Dean – music producer, music programming (track 1)
- Patrick Demarchelier – photography
- Mikkel S. Eriksen – recording engineer (track 3), instrumentation (3, 6), producer (3, 6)
- Abel Garibaldi – instrumental recording engineer (track 11)
- Fernando Garibay – music producer (track 2)
- Chris Gehringer – mastering
- Charlotte Gibson – background vocals (track 8)
- Angela N. Golightly – production coordination
- Christy Hall – production assistant
- Andrew Hey – audio mixing (track 11), vocal recording engineer (2, 4–6, 8–9, 11)
- Gary Houston – background vocals (track 8)
- Whitney Houston – lead vocals (All tracks), executive producer, songwriter (5, 7, 10)
- Dabling Harward – vocal engineer
- Eric Hudson – music producer, all instruments (track 8)
- Tavia Ivey – background vocals (tracks 2, 8)
- Larry Eaglin Jackson – executive producer, A&R
- Chad Jolley – instrumental recording engineer (track 9)
- Claude Kelly – vocal producer
- Robert Kelly (R. Kelly) – music arranger, producer (track 11)
- Alicia Keys – vocal producer, vocal arrangement, music producer (track 1)
- Emanuel Kiriakou – producer, all other instruments (track 4)
- Damien Lewis – engineer
- Donnie Lyle – guitar, musical direction
- Tony Maserati – mixing
- Harvey Mason Jr. – producer (track 4), mixing (11), vocal producer (2, 5–6, 8, 11)
- Kenny Mason – choir director (track 4)
- Jeff Meeks – instrumental recording engineer (track 11)
- Jan Fairchild – engineer
- Nick Fainbarg – engineer
- Ian Mereness – instrumental recording engineer (track 11)
- Ann Mincieli – recording engineer (track 1)
- Luis Navarro – assistant
- Dave Pensado – mixing
- Jochem van der Saag – synthesizer, recording engineer, drum machine, audio mixing, sound design (track 7)
- Miguel Scott – assistant
- Timothy Snell – stylist
- Bernt Rune Stray – guitar
- Phil Tan – mixing
- Aliaune "Akon" Thiam – music producer (tracks 5, 10), vocals (5)
- Pat Thrall – instrumental recording engineer (track 4)
- Miki Tsutsumi – assistant
- Giorgio Tuinfort – co-producer, additional music programming (tracks 5, 10)

=== Recording locations and studios ===
- Atlanta (Konkast, Patchwerk)
- Burbank (Boom Boom Room)
- Chicago (Chocolate Factory)
- Hollywood (Record Plant)
- Las Vegas (Studio at the Palms)
- Los Angeles (1221, Chalice Recording)
- Miami (Hit Factory Criteria)
- New York (Chun King, Germano, KMA, OVEN, Roc the Mic, Sterling Sound)
- Norcross (Tree Sound)
- North Hollywood (Mason Sound)
- San Francisco (Soapbox West)

== Charts ==
=== Weekly charts ===
2009–2010 weekly chart performance for I Look to You
Chart (2009–2010)	Peak position
Argentine Albums (CAPIF)	2
Australian Albums (ARIA)	16
Austrian Albums (Ö3 Austria)	3
Belgian Albums (Ultratop Flanders)	7
Belgian Albums (Ultratop Wallonia)	9
Brazilian Albums (ABPD)	6
Canadian Albums (Billboard)	1
Croatian Albums (HDU)	22
Czech Albums (IFPI)	4
Danish Albums (Hitlisten)	2
European Top 100 Albums (Billboard)	1
Dutch Albums (Album Top 100)	1
Finnish Albums (Suomen virallinen lista)	17
French Albums (SNEP)	3
German Albums (Offizielle Top 100)	1
Hungarian Albums (MAHASZ)	5
Irish Albums (IRMA)	3
Italian Albums (FIMI)	1
Japanese Albums (Oricon)	16
Mexican Albums (Top 100 Mexico)	42
New Zealand Albums (RMNZ)	10
Norwegian Albums (VG-lista)	2
Polish Albums (ZPAV)	1
Portuguese Albums (AFP)	25
Scottish Albums (Official Charts)	4
South African Albums (RISA)	6
South Korean Albums (Circle)	18
Spanish Albums (Promusicae)	3
Swedish Albums (Sverigetopplistan)	2
Swiss Albums (Schweizer Hitparade)	1
UK Albums (Official Charts)	3
UK R&B Albums (Official Charts)	1
US Billboard 200	1
US Top R&B/Hip-Hop Albums (Billboard)	1

2012 weekly chart performance for I Look to You
Chart (2012)	Peak position
South Korean International Albums (Circle)	29
Swiss Albums (Schweizer Hitparade)	42
UK R&B Albums (OCC)	10
US Billboard 200	13

=== Year-end charts ===
2009 year-end chart performance for I Look to You
Chart (2009)	Position
Australian Urban Albums (ARIA)	19
Austrian Albums (Ö3 Austria)	67
Belgian Albums (Ultratop Flanders)	83
Dutch Albums (Album Top 100)	88
European Top 100 Albums (Music & Media)	28
German Albums (Offizielle Top 100)	51
Hungarian Albums (MAHASZ)	32
Polish Albums (ZPAV)	65
Swedish Albums (Sverigetopplistan)	32
Swiss Albums (Schweizer Hitparade)	42
UK Albums (OCC)	70
US Billboard 200	29
US Top R&B/Hip-Hop Albums (Billboard)	9

2010 year-end chart performance for I Look to You
Chart (2010)	Position
US Top R&B/Hip-Hop Albums (Billboard)	46

== Certifications and sales ==
Region	Certification	Certified units/sales
Austria (IFPI Austria)	Gold	10,000^{*}
Canada (Music Canada)	Platinum	80,000^{^}
France (SNEP)	Gold	50,000^{*}
GCC (IFPI Middle East)	Gold	3,000^{*}
Germany (BVMI)	Gold	100,000^{^}
Hungary (MAHASZ)	Gold	3,000^{^}
Ireland (IRMA)	Platinum	15,000^{^}
Italy (FIMI)	Gold	35,000^{*}
Poland (ZPAV)	Platinum	20,000^{*}
Russia (NFPF)	Gold	10,000^{*}
Sweden (GLF)	Gold	20,000^{^}
Switzerland (IFPI Switzerland)	Gold	15,000^{^}
United Kingdom (BPI)	Gold	100,000^{^}
United States (RIAA)	Platinum	1,000,000^{^}
Summaries
Worldwide	—	3,000,000
^{*} Sales figures based on certification alone.^{^} Shipments figures based on certification alone.

== Release history ==
I Look to You release history
Region	Date	Label(s)	Format(s)	Catalogue	Ref.
Germany	August 28, 2009	Sony Music Entertainment	CD, digital download	88697580202	
Italy	August 28, 2009	Sony Music Entertainment	CD, digital download	88697580202	
Denmark	August 28, 2009	Sony Music Entertainment	CD, digital download	88697580202	
Finland	August 28, 2009	Sony Music Entertainment	CD, digital download	88697580202	
Sweden	August 28, 2009	Sony Music Entertainment	CD, digital download	88697580202	
Ireland	August 28, 2009	Sony Music Entertainment	CD, digital download	88697100332	
United States	August 31, 2009	Arista Records	CD, digital download	886971003321	
Canada	August 31, 2009	Sony Music Entertainment	CD, digital download	886971003321	
Hong Kong	August 31, 2009	Sony Music Entertainment	CD, digital download	88697100332	
France	August 31, 2009	Sony Music Entertainment	CD, digital download	88697580202	
Greece	August 31, 2009	Sony Music Entertainment	CD, digital download	88697580202	
Netherlands	September 1, 2009	Sony Music Entertainment	CD, digital download	88697580202	
South Korea	September 1, 2009	Sony Music Entertainment	CD, digital download	88697100332	
Australia	September 4, 2009	Sony Music Entertainment	CD, digital download	88697580202	
Taiwan	September 11, 2009	Sony Music Entertainment	CD, digital download	88697100332	
Spain	September 15, 2009	Sony Music Entertainment	CD, digital download	88697580202	
Japan	September 16, 2009	Sony Music Japan	CD, digital download	BVCP-40096	
Brazil	September 29, 2009	Sony Music Entertainment	CD, digital download	886971003321	
United Kingdom	October 19, 2009	RCA Records	CD, digital download	88697100332	
United Kingdom	November 6, 2009	RCA Records	Remix album		
