= Million Dollar Bill =

2009 single by Whitney Houston

Single by Whitney Houston

from the album I Look to You
- A-side: "I Look to You"
- Released: August 18, 2009
- Studio: Oven Studios (New York, NY); Germano Studios (New York, NY)
- Genre: R&B; disco; dance
- Length: 3:23
- Label: Arista
- Songwriters: Alicia Keys; Kaseem "Swizz Beatz" Dean; Norman Harris
- Producers: Swizz Beatz; Alicia Keys

Whitney Houston singles chronology
"I Look to You" (2009)	"Million Dollar Bill" (2009)	"Celebrate" (2012)

Music video
- "Million Dollar Bill" on YouTube

"Million Dollar Bill" is a song recorded by American singer Whitney Houston from her seventh and final studio album, I Look to You (2009). The song was written by Alicia Keys, her husband Kaseem "Swizz Beatz" Dean and Norman Harris, and produced by Keys and Beatz. It was released as the official worldwide lead (second in the US) single from the album on August 18, 2009, through Arista Records in the US and August 24, 2009, through RCA Records in the UK. It is Houston's final single from a studio album, and the last single released in her lifetime before her death in 2012. The song samples R&B singer Loleatta Holloway's "We're Getting Stronger", written by Norman Harris.

Upon its release, it was a moderate pop success in the United States, becoming her second entry from I Look To You on the Billboard Hot 100, and her last entry prior to her death. It became her 31st top 20 hit on the Hot R&B/Hip-Hop Songs chart, and topped the Hot Dance Club Songs and Adult R&B Songs charts. The song became Houston's comeback hit in Europe, peaking at number five in the United Kingdom and number eight in Ireland, while also appearing on the charts in ten other countries in Europe and reaching the top 20 of the Eurochart Hot 100. It is widely considered to be one of the best songs Houston recorded in her later years, based on multiple lists and compilations.

== Background and composition ==
"Million Dollar Bill" was written by singer-songwriter Alicia Keys and Swizz Beatz and samples R&B singer Loleatta Holloway's "We're Getting Stronger" from Holloway's 1977 Loleatta LP. Houston said to MTV News:

“When (Keys) performed at one of (Clive Davis's) parties the year before last, I kind of looked at her, and it was when she had (the "No One") record out, and it was the only record that came on the radio that inspired me ... “I walked over to her, and off the cuff said, ‘Hey, do you think you could produce me?’ She said, ‘Yeah, I think I can’. Then I performed a year after, and she came up with the song "Million Dollar Bill", and I said, 'Wow, incredible'", Houston explained.

The song was produced by Keys with hip-hop producer and husband Swizz Beatz producing an old school R&B beat. Beatz told MTV News that the process on the song started when he got a call from Clive Davis and record executive Larry Jackson.

The song received praise at her album I Look to You's listening parties and was cited as a "big comeback record". Houston performed the song live on The X Factor in the UK on Sunday, October 18 the night before the album was released in that territory.

Whitney Houston "Million Dollar Bill" (2009)
21 second sample from Whitney Houston's "Million Dollar Bill". The song is an old school disco song with production from Swizz Beatz. The lyrics talk about love.

Million Dollar Bill has an uptempo "pop dance groove" with strong disco influences. The song lasts for three minutes and twenty four seconds. Written in the key of B Minor, the song's beat is set in common time and moves at a tempo of 120 beats per minute. Houston's voice spans A_{3} to the note of B_{4}. The song also features a sample of Loleatta Holloway's 1977 song "We're Getting Stronger (The Longer We Stay Together)".

== Critical reception ==
From the New York listening party, Rolling Stone said the song "is a clattering, uptempo hip-hop-inspired number. It may be the fastest ever for Houston, who keeps up nicely. It received a standing ovation setting the tone for much of the album." Dean Piper of the Daily Mirror considered it a "summer track" reminiscent of Janet Jackson's "The Best Things in Life Are Free."

Nick Levine of Digital Spy said the song is a "midtempo disco track with an unabashedly feelgood message" and a "classy, dignified and thoroughly likeable comeback effort", while Houston's voice "is deeper and raspier than you might remember, but she's still capable of going for a money note". Bill Lamb of About.com rated the song 3.5 stars out of five in a mixed review, saying that "the performance is undeniably the Whitney Houston we all know" and Keys "has written a song that fits very well with her tradition of 'old soul' songs", but with the "very old school R&B" approach from Beatz it is "all almost too familiar" and "Houston failed to give it a new twist that would successfully make the old stunningly new again." Gail Mitchell of Billboard wrote: "this club jam practically screams remix. Produced by Alicia Keys and Swizz Beatz, it's accented by a catchy hook on which Houston emphatically notes, "If he makes you feel like a million dollar bill, say it."

== Chart performance ==
The success of "Million Dollar Bill" in the United States was described as "modest". The song entered the Billboard Hot 100 at number 100 on the issue date September 19, 2009, dropping out of the chart the following week, mainly due to it charting simultaneously with the title track reaching its peak position at number 70. The single marked Houston's lowest peak on the chart in her career. It fared better on the R&B/Hip-Hop Songs chart. "Million Dollar Bill" spent 30 weeks there, peaking at number 16 on the issue date December 19, 2009. This was Houston's longest run on the chart since her 1999 single "It's Not Right but It's Okay". It was also Houston's highest peak since "Same Script, Different Cast", which was released in 2000. The song topped the Adult R&B Songs chart for two weeks on December 19, 2009, and December 26, 2009. The song appeared at the year-end lists of both the R&B/Hip-Hop Songs and Hot Adult R&B Songs lists at numbers 81 and 20 respectively. It lasted 12 weeks on the Dance/Club Play Songs chart, topping the chart on November 7, 2009. It brought her total of number-ones on the chart to 13. It is also her longest run and her highest peak on the chart since 2003's "Love That Man". "Million Dollar Bill" would be Houston's final No. 1 hit of her lifetime as she'd pass away more than two years later in February 2012. In addition to the US, "Million Dollar Bill" also spent five weeks on the Billboard Canadian Hot 100, peaking at 62 on September 19, 2009.

"Million Dollar Bill" first appeared on the UK Singles Chart, in the week of October 17, 2009, placing at number 12. The Freemasons remix was promoted. Going into its third week on October 31, 2009, the song reached number 5 in the same week it peaked at number 2 on the R&B chart. This made the single Houston's highest position on the chart in over ten years ("My Love Is Your Love", number-two, July 3, 1999). It remained on the chart for 14 consecutive weeks. On January 23, 2010, it re-entered the chart at #95, then dropped out the next week. This 15-week chart run was Houston's longest run since 1999's "It's Not Right but It's Okay", also 15 weeks. The song re-entered on the week of February 25, 2012, following Houston's death. It charted at number 62. "Million Dollar Bill" entered the UK Top 40 R&B Singles chart at number-seven on October 17, 2009. It went on to last 20 weeks, its last entry dated February 27, 2010 (number 32).

The single charted in other European countries. "Million Dollar Bill" entered the Irish Singles Chart on October 8, 2009, at number 45. After four weeks on the chart, it peaked at number-eight. It spent ten weeks on the Irish charts. Released as a double A-side in Germany with "I Look to You", It spent eight weeks on their singles chart (October 19 – December 13, 2009). It peaked at 41. It's her longest run in Germany since 1999's "I Learned from the Best" and her highest position since 1993's "I Have Nothing". It also spent five weeks on the Dutch Single Top 100, peaking on September 12, 2009, at number 58. It's her longest run in the Netherlands since 2003's "One of Those Days" and her highest position since 2002's "Whatchulookinat". "Million Dollar Bill" debuted on the Swiss Singles Top 75 at number 40 and remained in the chart for two weeks after (September 13–27, 2009). In Sweden, it entered the Singles Top 60 at number 22. It steadily fell for the next four weeks. It was Houston's highest position there since 2000's "Could I Have This Kiss Forever". The single placed on Belgium's charts as well. It lasted on Ultratip Flanders for five weeks, peaking at number-six; additionally, it lasted on Ultratip Wallonia for seven weeks, peaking at number-three. "Million Dollar Bill" lasted one week and two weeks in Finland (peaked at number 18) and Italy (peaked at number 15) respectively. Its European success led to Houston returning to the Eurochart Hot 100 for the first time since "Whatchulookinat" peaked at number 40 there in 2002 where it reached a peak of number 15, becoming Houston's milestone 30th and final entry on the chart prior to her death and also producing her best chart result since "Could I Have This Kiss Forever".

The track also made appearances on "end-of-year" charts as well. In the United Kingdom, the song finished 2009 on the year-end singles chart at number 90. In America, "Million Dollar Bill" placed in two charts from two different years. It landed at number 25 for the Dance/Club Play Songs in 2009. A year later, it placed at 81 for the R&B/Hip-Hop Songs chart.

== Music video ==
Houston in the music video for "Million Dollar Bill" dancing as dollar bills fall around her alluding to the theme of the song.

The music video for 'Million Dollar Bill' was directed by Melina Matsoukas (who directed the music video for Houston's previous song "I Look to You"), known for working with artists such as Kylie Minogue, Beyoncé, Lady Gaga and Ciara. The video ranked at the bottom of BET's Notarized: Top 100 Videos of 2009.

It premiered on Houston's official website on September 16, 2009.

The video also made its world premiere on the music video stations BET, VH1 and MTV2 shortly after Houston's interview with Oprah Winfrey aired.

The video featured Houston entering a dry cleaners and making her way through a kitchen wearing a fur coat. On exiting the kitchen, the music begins, and she walks into a night club with her then removing her coat and singing on a small stage.

Throughout the video, Houston is seen in several different outfits, including a metallic dress and knee high boots, and, as the video progresses, a pink dress and a full-length silver dress. The video concludes as Houston is walking away in the silver dress, with dollar bills blowing around.

It would become the last music video Houston would produce prior to her death.

== Legacy and retrospective accolades ==
The song was first covered by former American Idol singer Frenchie Davis in 2010. Since then, it's been covered by several acts including Wyles, Alan Benn, Block & Crown and Kevin McKay. In 2023, it was covered by Beyond Chicago with Majestic and Alex Mills as featured guests. Their rendition was a modest top 75 hit in the United Kingdom upon its release that year. The song was also sampled by several acts including Genius of Time, Sweater Beats, Crowd Control, X3 and Bright Light Bright Light, who performed a mashup of the song and Wham!'s 1984 hit, "Last Christmas".

Since Houston's death, the song has appeared in best-of lists in relation to Houston. In 2024, Forbes listed the song as one of Houston's 20 greatest songs, writing that the song "mirrored the nostalgic and uptempo disco influence of songs from the ‘80s", and that despite the song not winning Houston any awards, wrote that it "showed that the singer truly enjoyed her craft, even in the later stages of her career." In their list of the 25 best Houston songs, Entertainment Weekly ranked the dance song 17th place, writing that the song "was a sweetly saucy celebration of feeling like hot currency in the right relationship". In its list of Houston's 40 best songs, BET ranked it 32nd place, writing that the song "finds her recapturing her youthful, party-starting early days".

== Track listings and formats ==
- German double A-side single
1. "I Look to You" – 4:25
2. "Million Dollar Bill" – 3:24
- UK and Europe CD single
1. "Million Dollar Bill" (album version) – 3:24
2. "Million Dollar Bill" (Freemasons Radio Mix) – 3:48
- US CD single
1. "Million Dollar Bill" (album version) – 3:24
2. "Million Dollar Bill" (instrumental) – 3:21
- Australian CD single
1. "Million Dollar Bill" (album version) – 3:25
2. "Million Dollar Bill" (instrumental) – 3:22
3. "Million Dollar Bill" (call out hook) – 0:14
- Poland CD single (Freemasons remixes)
1. "Million Dollar Bill" (Freemasons Radio Mix) – 3:48
2. "Million Dollar Bill" (Freemasons Club Mix) – 8:10
3. "Million Dollar Bill" (Freemasons Mixshow) – 4:45
- US and UK album remixes (EP 1)
1. "Million Dollar Bill" (Freemasons Radio Mix) – 3:49
2. "Million Dollar Bill" (Frankie Knuckles Radio Mix) – 3:15
3. "I Look to You" (Johnny Vicious Warehouse Radio Mix) – 4:08
4. "I Look to You" (Johnny Vicious Club Radio Mix) – 3:52
5. "I Didn't Know My Own Strength" (Peter Rauhofer Radio Edit) – 3:04
6. "I Didn't Know My Own Strength" (Daddy's Groove Magic Island Radio Mix) – 3:11
7. "I Look to You" (Christian Dio Radio Mix) – 4:01
8. "I Look to You" (Giuseppe D. Tune Adiks Radio Edit) – 3:47
- UK and US single remixes (EP 2)
1. "Million Dollar Bill" (Freemasons Radio Mix) – 3:49
2. "Million Dollar Bill" (Freemasons Club Mix) – 8:10
3. "Million Dollar Bill" (Freemasons Mixshow) – 5:00
4. "Million Dollar Bill" (Frankie Knuckles Radio Mix) – 3:15
5. "Million Dollar Bill" (Frankie Knuckles Club Mix) – 7:08
6. "Million Dollar Bill" (Frankie Knuckles Dub Mix) – 6:59

== Personnel ==
Credits

- Mixing – Tony Maserati
- Engineering assistance and mixing – Christian Baker, Miki Tsutsumi, Val Brathwaite
- Production – Alicia Keys, Swizz Beatz
- Vocal production and arrangement – Whitney Houston, Alicia Keys
- Programming – Swizz Beatz
- Recording engineer – Ann Mincieli
- Writing – Alicia Keys, Kasseem Dean, Norman Harris

Sample "We're Getting Stronger" by Loleatta Holloway

- Sample writers – Allan Felder, Norman Harris, Ronald Tyson

Recording and mixing

- Recorded and engineered in New York City at the Oven Studios and Germano Studios
- Mixed for Two Chord Music Inc. at Oven Studios, New York City.

== Charts ==
=== Weekly charts ===
Chart (2009–2010)	Peak position
Australia (ARIA)	181
Belgium (Ultratip Bubbling Under Flanders)	6
Belgium (Ultratip Bubbling Under Wallonia)	3
Canada Hot 100 (Billboard)	62
Canada AC (Billboard)	20
CIS Airplay (TopHit)	120
Euro Digital Song Sales (Billboard)	6
Europe (European Hot 100 Singles)	15
Finland (Suomen virallinen lista)	18
Germany (GfK) Double A-side with "I Look to You"	41
Global Dance Tracks (Billboard)	11
Hungary (Rádiós Top 40)	40
Ireland (IRMA)	8
Italy (FIMI)	15
Mexico Ingles Airplay (Billboard)	3
Netherlands (Dutch Top 40 Tipparade)	9
Netherlands (Single Top 100)	58
Scottish Singles Sales (Official Charts)	6
Sweden (Sverigetopplistan)	22
Switzerland (Schweizer Hitparade)	40
UK Singles (Official Charts)	5
UK Hip Hop/R&B (Official Charts)	2
US Billboard Hot 100	100
US Dance Club Songs (Billboard)	1
US Hot R&B/Hip-Hop Songs (Billboard)	16
US Adult R&B Songs (Billboard)	1

Chart (2012)	Peak position
UK Singles (Official Charts)	62

=== Year-end charts ===
Chart (2009)	Position
Japan Adult Contemporary (Billboard)	33
UK Singles (OCC)	90
US Dance Club Songs (Billboard)	25

Chart (2010)	Position
US Hot R&B/Hip-Hop Songs (Billboard)	81
US Adult R&B Songs (Billboard)	20

== Certifications and sales ==
Region	Certification	Certified units/sales
United Kingdom (BPI)	Platinum	600,000^{‡}
United States	—	300,000
^{‡} Sales+streaming figures based on certification alone.

== Release history ==
Region	Date	Format(s)	Label(s)
United States	August 18, 2009	Airplay, digital download	Arista Records
Germany	August 18, 2009	Digital download	Sony Music Entertainment
United Kingdom	August 18, 2009	Digital download	RCA Records, Arista
Germany	October 2, 2009	Double A-side single	Sony Music Entertainment
United Kingdom	October 5, 2009	CD single, iTunes download	RCA Records, Arista
UK & US	November 6, 2009	Album remixes (Digital, EP 1)	RCA Records, Arista
UK & US	November 10, 2009	Single remixes (Digital, EP 2)	RCA Records, Arista

== Beyond Chicago, Majestic and Alex Mills version ==
"Million Dollar Bill"

Single by Beyond Chicago x Majestic x Alex Mills
- Released: June 2023
- Genre: Dance
- Length: 2:56
- Songwriters: Alicia Keys; Kaseem "Swizz Beatz" Dean; Norman Harris
- Producers: Beyond Chicago; Majestic

In June 2023, British producers Beyond Chicago, producer Majestic and singer Alex Mills released a dance cover version of "Million Dollar Bill". The song peaked at No. 67 on the UK singles chart.

== See also ==
- List of number-one dance singles of 2009 (U.S.)
