= I Didn't Know My Own Strength (Whitney Houston song) =

- Remix EP download cover

Promotional single by Whitney Houston

from the album I Look to You
- Released: November 6, 2009
- Recorded: 2009
- Studio: 1221 Studios (Los Angeles, CA)
- Genre: R&B; gospel
- Length: 3:44
- Label: Arista
- Songwriter: Diane Warren
- Producer: David Foster

Lyric video
- "Whitney Houston - I Didn't Know My Own Strength (Official Lyric Video)" on YouTube

"I Didn't Know My Own Strength" is a song performed by American singer Whitney Houston, taken from her seventh studio album I Look to You (2009).

The song was written by Diane Warren, and produced by David Foster, both of whom have written and produced for Houston before. The song was originally supposed to precede the album's U.K. release on August 31, 2009 and U.S. release on September 1, 2009 but was cancelled in favor of "I Look to You" and "Million Dollar Bill". However, the song was released on November 6, 2009 as a promotional single.

Her live performance on The Oprah Winfrey Show was included in her 2014 live album, Whitney Houston Live: Her Greatest Performances.

The official lyric video was released on March 7, 2023.

== Critical reception ==
When reviewing the album, Digital Spy described the song along with the title track "the album's pair of classic Whitney ballads." In their list of the 25 best Whitney Houston songs, Billboard ranked it number 17 and labeled the song as "perhaps Whitney's last great mega-ballad, a towering testament to having to find out the hard way about one’s own sense of perseverance." In its list of 20 greatest Houston songs, The Guardian voted the ballad number 14, calling it a "final grandstanding ballad", further stating "there's something genuinely moving about hearing her deliver them in a huskier, lower voice than the one that made her famous, adding a patina of hard-won knowledge.

== Background ==
Though never officially released, the song was leaked to the Internet. However, music mogul Clive Davis said at the album's official launch party in London that all of the tracks on the album remain unfinished. The song's release was originally confirmed by Diane Warren who told Vibe Magazine she had penned the single especially for Houston, and it would be released as the first single. At the album listening parties, Davis said the album track "Call You Tonight" was a candidate for the lead single. Following previous reports, this led to speculation that "I Didn't Know My Own Strength" would receive a limited release to generate buzz for the album, whilst a different song will be fully promoted and released to propel the album's release. Title song "I Look to You" was released as the U.S. lead single whilst "Million Dollar Bill" (the second U.S. release) became the international lead single. Houston performed the song on The Oprah Winfrey Show on September 15, 2009 and live on the 2009 American Music Awards broadcast.

== Track listing ==
Due to the popularity of the song, a remix-EP was released alongside remixes for the two official singles on November 6, 2009.

1. "I Didn't Know My Own Strength" (Peter Rauhofer Radio Edit) – 3:04
2. "I Didn't Know My Own Strength" (Peter Rauhofer Mixshow) – 5:15
3. "I Didn't Know My Own Strength" (Daddy's Groove Magic Island Radio Mix) – 3:11
4. "I Didn't Know My Own Strength" (Daddy's Groove Magic Island Mixshow) – 5:19
5. "I Didn't Know My Own Strength" (Daddy's Groove Magic Island Club Mix) – 7:23

== Charts ==
Chart (2009)	Peak position
Ireland (IRMA)	38
Japan (Japan Hot 100)	16
UK Singles (Official Charts)	44
US Bubbling Under Hot 100 (Billboard)	19
US Adult R&B Songs (Billboard)	35
US Dance Club Songs (Billboard)	17
US Hot R&B/Hip-Hop Songs (Billboard)	66
