= The Greatest Love World Tour =

1986 concert tour by Whitney Houston

- World tour by Whitney Houston
- Location: Asia; Europe; North America; Oceania
- Associated album: Whitney Houston
- Start date: July 26, 1986
- End date: December 1, 1986
- Legs: 4
- No. of shows: 57
- Box office: $5 million ($13.61 in 2025 dollars) (North America leg)

Whitney Houston concert chronology
- US Tour (1985); The Greatest Love World Tour (1986); Moment of Truth World Tour (1987–88)

The Greatest Love World Tour was the debut worldwide concert tour (and second overall) by American singer and actress Whitney Houston, in support of her debut studio album Whitney Houston. The four-month tour began in North America on July 26, 1986 at the Merriweather Post Pavilion with an itinerary that included visits in Europe, Japan and Australia. In all, Houston toured in four continents in a span of six months.

== Background ==
Houston's debut album was released in early 1985 and she performed at various clubs to promote the album. Following the success of the US #1 R&B hit single "You Give Good Love", Houston became the opening act for singers' Luther Vandross and Jeffrey Osborne on their individual 1985 US tours. After the next single, "Saving All My Love For You" became Houston's first #1 on the US Hot 100, she began headlining her own shows, playing at various American theaters, festivals, and clubs throughout the summer and fall of 1985. With more #1 hits on the way, and Houston's album at the top of the album charts, she would become a household name. She then embarked on her first worldwide tour, the successful The Greatest Love Tour. The tour started in North America during mid-1986, before heading to Europe, Japan, Australia and back to the US for a final show in Hawaii at the end of the year.

== The show ==
The show consisted of Houston on a fringed round stage in the center of the arena/theater with a 9-piece band playing and four backup vocalists behind her. There were no costume changes or background dancers. Brother Gary Garland would replace Jermaine Jackson and Teddy Pendergrass on the duets. Comedian Sylvia Traymore served as the opening act.

While on her first global tour, Houston revealed she was a creative musician; rearranging most of the songs during her shows and sometimes deviating from the album's version. In "You Give Good Love", Houston would slow it down and emphasize the soulful elements of the song, treating it like a gospel number while breaking it down in a reggae melody with her background singers. During "Saving All My Love", Houston arranged the song into a bluesy jazz number that recalled Billie Holiday. Houston often scatted with sax player Josh Harris during the end of the song. Many critics noted "He/I Believe" and "I Am Changing" as the show's highlights. The former is a song she learned from her mother which joins the gospel songs "He Is" with "I Believe". The latter is a cover of the show Jennifer Holliday's show stopping Dreamgirls song. After opening the show with a tease of the anthemic "Greatest Love of All", Houston closed out the show with a slowed down soulful version of the song.

Billboard magazine's Carlo Wolff said the following on his column for her show at Saratoga Performing Arts Center on July 28, 1986.

For the second date of her first headlining tour, the show was remarkably polished and emotional...A versatile, purposeful singer, Houston may not be La Diva yet. But she is certainly La Divette.

== Opening acts ==
Sylvia Morrison from Washington, DC, is the first black female impressionist/comedian.

- Sylvia Traymore Morrison (US—leg)
- Mark McCollum (comedian) (US—leg)
- Kenny G (US—leg, select dates)

== Set list ==
1. Instrumental intro (contains elements of "Also sprach Zarathustra" and excerpts from "Greatest Love of All")
2. "Wanna Be Startin' Somethin'"
3. "Eternal Love"
4. "You Give Good Love"
5. "Hold Me" (duet with Gary Houston)
6. "How Will I Know"
7. "Take Good Care of My Heart" (duet with Gary Houston)
8. "Nobody Loves Me Like You Do" (duet with Gary Houston)
9. "Saving All My Love for You"
10. "Someone for Me
11. "I Am Changing"
12. "Heart to Heart"
13. "All at Once" (Note: performed in Europe and Japan)
14. "He, I Believe"
15. "Greatest Love of All"

Notes

Additional notes

- July, August: for select dates, Houston performed "Memories" (recorded prior to her debut album), "A Brand New Day" and a duet with her mother, singer Cissy Houston.
- Houston also added Kenny Loggins's US pop hit "Heart to Heart" and "I Am Changing" from the musical Dreamgirls as part of her setlist.
- August 4: at the Garden State Arts Center show, Whitney performed "When I First Saw You" with her mother Cissy and brother Gary.
- September 13: for the concert in Mountain View, Houston brought out a cake and sang "Happy Birthday" to her father, John Houston.
- Houston was also working on her second album and included two new songs in her set, "I Wanna Dance With Somebody (Who Loves Me)" and "Didn't We Almost Have It All".

== Shows ==
List of concerts, showing date, city, country, venue, tickets sold, number of available tickets and amount of gross revenue
Date	City	Country	Venue	Attendance	Revenue
North America
July 26, 1986	Columbia	United States	Merriweather Post Pavilion	13,000 / 13,000	$176,267
July 28, 1986	Saratoga Springs	United States	Saratoga Performing Arts Center	20,000 / 20,000	$218,735
July 29, 1986	Boston	United States	Boston Common	37,000 / 37,000	$667,065
July 31, 1986	Boston	United States	Boston Common	37,000 / 37,000	$667,065
August 1, 1986	Boston	United States	Boston Common	37,000 / 37,000	$667,065
August 2, 1986	Wantagh	United States	Jones Beach Marine Theater	20,600 / 20,600 (Note: The score data is combined from the shows held at Jones Beach Marine Theater on August 2 and 6 respectively.)	$376,326
August 4, 1986	Holmdel Township	United States	Garden State Arts Center	10,600 / 10,600	$156,647
August 6, 1986	Wantagh	United States	Jones Beach Marine Theater		
August 10, 1986	Atlanta	United States	Chastain Park Amphitheater	12,702 / 12,702	$259,545
August 11, 1986	Atlanta	United States	Chastain Park Amphitheater	12,702 / 12,702	$259,545
August 12, 1986	Nashville	United States	Starwood Amphitheatre	—N/a	—N/a
August 14, 1986	Cincinnati	United States	Riverbend Music Center	16,289 / 16,289	$251,000
August 15, 1986	Louisville	United States	Freedom Hall	15,600 / 15,600	$156,310
August 16, 1986	Indianapolis	United States	Indiana State Fairgrounds Coliseum	16,287 / 16,287	$225,965
August 18, 1986	Cuyahoga Falls	United States	Blossom Music Center	—N/a	—N/a
August 19, 1986	Clarkston	United States	Pine Knob Music Theatre	—N/a	—N/a
August 20, 1986	Clarkston	United States	Pine Knob Music Theatre	—N/a	—N/a
August 22, 1986	Toronto	Canada	CNE Grandstand	25,370 / 25,370	$465,286
August 24, 1986	Ottawa	Canada	Lansdowne Park	—N/a	—N/a
August 26, 1986	Montreal	Canada	Montreal Forum	—N/a	—N/a
August 27, 1986	Philadelphia	United States	Mann Music Center	—N/a	—N/a
August 30, 1986	Hoffman Estates	United States	Poplar Creek Music Theater	—N/a	—N/a
August 31, 1986	Hoffman Estates	United States	Poplar Creek Music Theater	—N/a	—N/a
September 1, 1986	St. Louis	United States	Municipal Theatre of St. Louis	9,846 / 9,846	$189,980
September 2, 1986	Bonner Springs	United States	Sandstone Center for the Performing Arts Center	—N/a	—N/a
September 7, 1986	Syracuse	United States	New York State Fairgrounds	—N/a	—N/a
September 8, 1986	Morrison	United States	Red Rocks Amphitheatre	8,950 / 8,950	$203,854
September 10, 1986	Salt Lake City	United States	Special Events Center	—N/a	—N/a
September 12, 1986	Sacramento	United States	Cal Expo Amphitheatre	8,273 / 8,500	$144,778
September 13, 1986	Mountain View	United States	Shoreline Amphitheatre	15,211 / 15,211	$256,782
September 14, 1986	Concord	United States	Concord Pavilion	8,333 / 8,333	$152,485
September 16, 1986	Fresno	United States	Selland Arena	5,908 / 5,908	$99,715
September 18, 1986	San Diego	United States	San Diego Sports Arena	9,051 / 9,051	$172,092
September 19, 1986	Costa Mesa	United States	Pacific Amphitheatre	13,946 / 18,764	$294,954
September 21, 1986	Los Angeles	United States	Greek Theatre	—N/a	—N/a
September 23, 1986	Los Angeles	United States	Greek Theatre	—N/a	—N/a
Europe
October 10, 1986	Brussels	Belgium	Forest National	—N/a	—N/a
October 11, 1986	Rotterdam	Netherlands	Rotterdam Ahoy	—N/a	—N/a
October 17, 1986	London	England	Wembley Arena	—N/a	—N/a
October 18, 1986	London	England	Wembley Arena	—N/a	—N/a
October 19, 1986	London	England	Wembley Arena	—N/a	—N/a
October 20, 1986	London	England	Wembley Arena	—N/a	—N/a
October 25, 1986	Glasgow	Scotland	SECC	—N/a	—N/a
October 26, 1986	London	England	Wembley Arena	—N/a	—N/a
Asia
November 4, 1986	Osaka	Japan	Osaka Festival Hall	—N/a	—N/a
November 5, 1986	Osaka	Japan	Osaka-jō Hall	—N/a	—N/a
November 6, 1986	Nagoya	Japan	Aichi Prefectural Gymnasium	—N/a	—N/a
November 8, 1986	Yokohama	Japan	Yokohama Cultural Gymnasium	—N/a	—N/a
November 10, 1986	Tokyo	Japan	Nippon Budokan	—N/a	—N/a
November 11, 1986	Tokyo	Japan	Nippon Budokan	—N/a	—N/a
November 12, 1986	Tokyo	Japan	Nippon Budokan	—N/a	—N/a
Oceania
November 15, 1986	Sydney	Australia	Sydney Entertainment Centre	—N/a	—N/a
November 16, 1986	Sydney	Australia	Sydney Entertainment Centre	—N/a	—N/a
November 17, 1986	Sydney	Australia	Sydney Entertainment Centre	—N/a	—N/a
November 25, 1986	Melbourne	Australia	Melbourne Entertainment Centre	—N/a	—N/a
North America
November 30, 1986	Honolulu	United States	Blaisdell Arena	17,600 / 17,600	$362,313
December 1, 1986	Honolulu	United States	Blaisdell Arena	17,600 / 17,600	$362,313
Total				285,066 / 290,011	$4,830,072

Cancellations and rescheduled shows

August 28, 1986	Geddes, New York	State Fair Grandstand	Rescheduled for September 7, 1986
November 19, 1986	Brisbane, Australia	Brisbane Entertainment Centre	Cancelled
November 20, 1986	Brisbane, Australia	Brisbane Entertainment Centre	Cancelled
November 23, 1986	Melbourne, Australia	Melbourne Sports and Entertainment Centre	Cancelled
November 24, 1986	Melbourne, Australia	Melbourne Sports and Entertainment Centre
November 26, 1986	Perth, Australia	Perth Entertainment Centre	Cancelled
November 27, 1986	Sydney, Australia	Sydney Entertainment Centre	Cancelled

== Personnel ==
Houston and John Simmons were friends from their church in New Jersey. While Houston was trying to get a recording contract, she would perform sets as part of her mother's nightclub act in New York City. Simmons was her musical director. Houston asked Simmons to put together a band that would back her during her nightclub act and record label showcases. The tour manager was Tony Bulluck, who remained her tour manager on several of her tours later, including the Nothing but Love Tour. Rickey Minor and Whitney's brother Gary Houston remained band members throughout her touring career.

Band

- Music director / piano – John Simmons
- Bass guitar / bass synthesizer – Ricky Minor
- Guitar – Curtis Taylor Neishloss
- Keyboards – Willard Meeks
- Saxophone – Josh Harris
- Drums – Brian Brake
- Percussion – Kevin Jones
- Background vocalists – Gary Houston, Felicia Moss, Voneva Simms, Billy Baker

Tour management

- Manager – Tony Bulluck

== Broadcast and recordings ==
- The show at Osaka-jō Hall on November 5 was broadcast live on Asahi Hōsō Radio in Japan. There were no official recordings released to the public.

== Ticket price score data ==
Not all ticket price dates are listed
July 26, 1986	Merriweather Post Pavilion, Columbia, MD	$16.50 / $11.50
July 28, 1986	Saratoga Performing Arts Center, Saratoga Springs, NY	$15 / $10
July 29, 31, August 1, 1986	Boston Common, Boston, MA	$19.50 / $17.50
August 2, 6, 1986	Jones Beach Theatre, Wantagh, New York	$22 / $20.50 / $17.50
August 4, 1986	Garden State Arts Center, Holmdel, NJ	$18.50 / $11
August 10, 11, 1986	Chastain Park, Atlanta, GA	$22 / $20.50 / $17.50
August 14, 1986	Riverbend Music Center, Cincinnati, OH	$20 / $11.50
August 15, 1986	Freedom Hall Arena, Louisville, KY	$10
August 16, 1986	Indiana State Fair, Indianapolis, IN	$14.50 / $12.50
August 22, 1986	CNE Stadium, Toronto, Ontario	$23.50 / $19.50
September 1, 1986	The Muny, St. Louis, MO	$20.50 / $18.50 / $16.50
September 8, 1986	Red Rocks Amphitheatre, Denver, CO	$24.40 / $22 / $19.80
September 12, 1986	California Exposition & State Fair, Sacramento, CA	$17.50
September 13, 1986	Shoreline Amphitheatre, Mountain View, CA	$18.50 / $15.50
September 14, 1986	Concord Pavilion, Concord, CA	$22.50 / $15.50
September 16, 1986	Fresno Convention Center, Fresno, CA	$17.50
September 18, 1986	San Diego Sports Arena, San Diego, CA	$25 / $18.50
September 19, 1986	Pacific Amphitheatre, Costa Mesa, CA	$24.75 / $15
November 30, December 1, 1986	Neal S. Blaisdell Center, Honolulu, HI	$22.50 / $17.50
