= Moment of Truth World Tour =

1987–88 concert tour by Whitney Houston

- World tour by Whitney Houston
- Cover of the official tour program
- Location: North America 90; Europe 46; Oceania 6 Asia 18
- Associated album: Whitney
- Start date: July 4, 1987
- End date: November 20, 1988
- Legs: 7
- No. of shows: 160
- Box office: $20 million ($54.45 in 2025 dollars) (North America leg)

Whitney Houston concert chronology
- The Greatest Love World Tour (1986); Moment of Truth World Tour (1987–88); I'm Your Baby Tonight World Tour (1991)

The Moment of Truth World Tour was the second world concert tour (and third concert tour overall) by American singer and actress Whitney Houston, which supported her hit album Whitney. The tour spanned fifteen months between July 1987 and November 1988, comprising 160 shows across four continents and 20 countries.

Pollstar Magazine's reported that it was the seventh-highest grossing tour in 1987, and the highest grossing tour by a female artist that year. The North American leg tour alone grossed over $20.1 million.

The name of the tour, Moment of Truth, was a track that was to be on the Whitney album and subsequently left off and was replaced with "You're Still My Man". The song "Moment of Truth" was featured on the B-side to the US 7-inch single for "I Wanna Dance With Somebody (Who Loves Me)". It was also released on the CD single for "Exhale (Shoop Shoop)".

== Overview ==
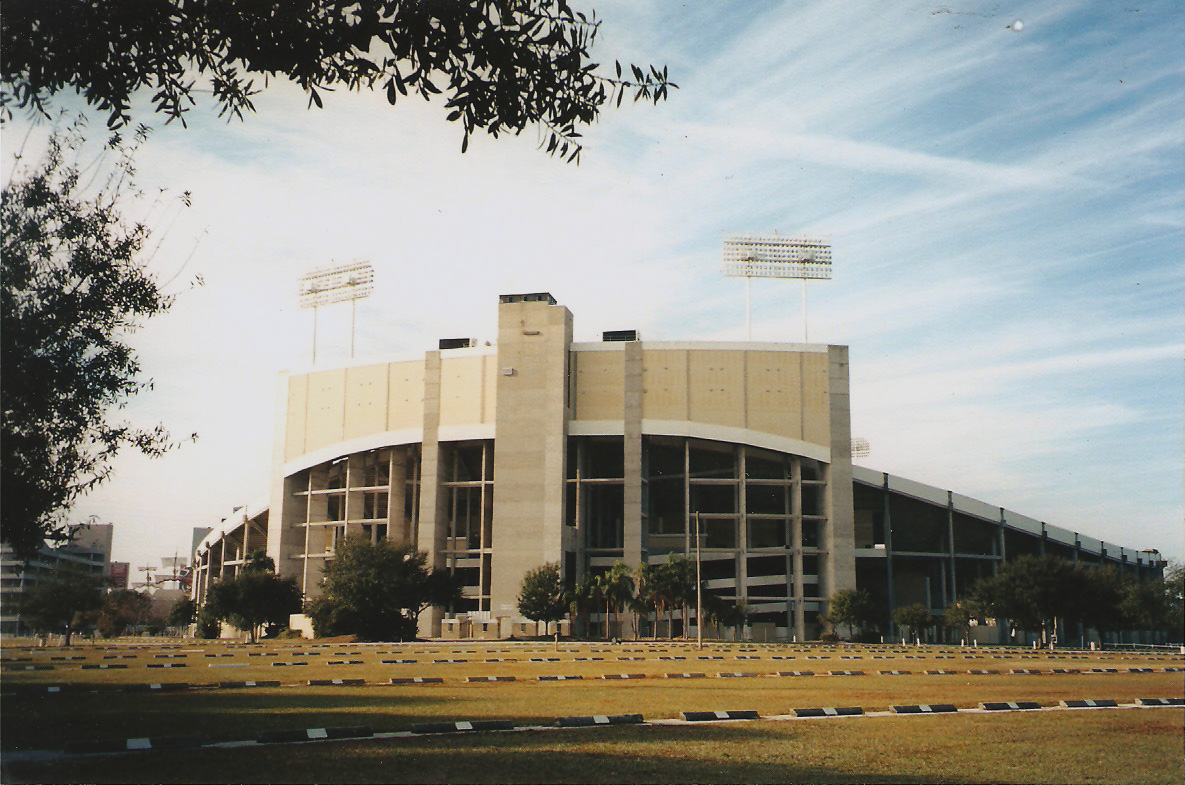
The Moment of Truth World Tour began in Tampa, Florida at Tampa Stadium.

Following the release of Whitney, Houston began promoting the album with a world tour. The tour began on July 4 in Tampa, Florida, where she played to over 50,000 people. Houston performed a total of 86 dates during the 1987 North American leg of the tour, returning to Florida, where that leg ended at the Orange County Convention Center in Orlando, Florida on December 8. Most of the North American shows followed the same pattern as her last tour with slight differences and an increasing number of songs, incorporating album tracks such as "Just the Lonely Talking Again", "Love Is a Contact Sport" and her Grammy-nominated rendition of "For the Love of You" along with the two then-current hit singles "I Wanna Dance with Somebody (Who Loves Me)" and "Didn't We Almost Have It All".

In Europe, Houston visited 14 countries and the microstate of Monaco, playing to over half a million fans. The European leg started in April 1988 with four dates at the Rotterdam Ahoy in Rotterdam, Netherlands. During the shows in Rotterdam, Houston received a call from her mentor Clive Davis, informing her of having set the all-time chart record of seven consecutive number one singles on the Billboard Hot 100 after her single "Where Do Broken Hearts Go" topped the chart. During the European and subsequent legs of the tour, "For the Love of You" and "Just the Lonely Talking Again" were replaced by "So Emotional" and "Where Do Broken Hearts Go" along with two covers of Aretha Franklin songs.

During May 1988, Houston played nine consecutive nights at Wembley Arena in London, then a historic record for a female performer at the arena, surpassing Tina Turner's seven-date residence during her Break Every Rule World Tour. On June 11, Houston cancelled an Italian concert date after agreeing to fly back to London to pay tribute to a then-imprisoned Nelson Mandela in support of the anti-apartheid movement at the Nelson Mandela 70th Birthday Tribute benefit concert. Houston performed a set at Wembley Stadium, playing to over 72,000 fans during the event. Following this, Houston resumed her tour in Italy. Following the end of the European leg of the tour, Houston returned to the United States to perform a benefit concert for the United Negro College Fund on August 28 at Madison Square Garden in New York City, which was then followed by an Arista Records party in Houston's honor for setting her consecutive number ones chart record. It was Houston's only North American date during 1988 after playing 86 dates the previous year. The concert raised over $300,000 for the UNCF.

The tour was one of the top ten highest-grossing tours of 1987. The North American leg of the tour alone grossed over $24 million, helping make Houston the second highest-earning female entertainer of the year, according to Forbes. Every date of the European leg of the tour was sold out. In 2025, the publication Consequence ranked the tour the 46th best tour of all time.

== The show ==
Like her previous tour, Houston again performed on a round stage in the center of the arena or auditorium so that everyone could see her. The seven-piece band was situated below her. There were two outfit changes; no stage props. However, unlike her previous tour, Houston called upon three backup dancers during the uptempo songs. The dance routines were choreographed by Damita Jo Freeman and Khandi Alexander. Jonathan Butler opened for select dates, and Kenny G was featured as the main opening act for the North American leg.

With two albums under her belt, the singer had more material to choose from. She included most of the songs from Whitney, the biggest hits from her debut, as well as the gospel song "He/I Believe". Houston also performed songs from her predecessors and peers during various concerts, interpreting Aretha Franklin, Chaka Khan, Luther Vandross, Anita Baker, and Janet Jackson. Like her debut tour, Houston proved herself to be a creative musician. She rearranged most of the songs into soulful jazzy numbers and did a lot of improvisation. The Montreal Gazette said, "Whatever faults the 24-year-old singer has, she is first and foremost a creative musician." The pop hit "How Will I Know" was given a jazzy beginning and gospel-like ending. "You Give Good Love" was slowed down into a steamy and sensual slow jam. Houston often scatted with sax player Jay Davidson on "Just the Lonely Talking Again". Most critics noted "He/I Believe" and "Greatest Love of All" as being the show's highlights.

Despite the praise for her voice and arrangements, many critics noted her lack of dancing and movements. The Richmond Times said "she is about as stiff as a cardboard box." Some noted that she lacked a true personality. Others complained that despite the name of the tour, she followed the same formula as her previous tour. Jon Pareles of the New York Times reviewed her Madison Square Garden concert and said, "Ms. Houston may be a new kind of pop singer for the video era: an encyclopedic, restless virtuoso. She has absorbed the soul and pop styles of everyone from Aretha Franklin to Barbra Streisand to Diana Ross to Al Green; she can deliver a gospel rasp, a velvety coo, a floating soprano and a cheerleader's whoop."

== Opening acts ==
- Kenny G (US leg)
- Jonathan Butler (US leg—select dates)
- Giorge Pettus (Europe leg—select dates)

== Set list ==
North America
1. Instrumental intro (contains elements of "How Will I Know, "Saving All My Love for You" and "You Give Good Love")
2. "Let the Feeling Flow"
3. "How Will I Know"
4. "You Give Good Love"
5. "Love Is a Contact Sport"
6. "Just the Lonely Talking Again"
7. "Love Will Save the Day"
8. "Saving All My Love for You"
9. "For the Love of You" (contains elements of "Never Too Much")
10. "He, I Believe"
11. "Didn't We Almost Have It All"
12. "Sweet Love" / "Control" / "Stop to Love"
13. "I Wanna Dance with Somebody (Who Loves Me)"
14. "Greatest Love of All"
Europe / Oceania / Asia
1. "Didn't We Almost Have It All"
2. "Love Will Save the Day"
3. "You Give Good Love"
4. "So Emotional"
5. "Where Do Broken Hearts Go"
6. "Love Is a Contact Sport"
7. "How Will I Know"
8. "Saving All My Love for You"
9. "He, I Believe"
10. "Wonderful Counselor" (contains elements of "He's All Right")
11. "(You Make Me Feel Like A) Natural Woman"
12. "You Send Me"
13. "Greatest Love of All"
14. "I Wanna Dance with Somebody (Who Loves Me)"

Notes

- 1987 North America leg: Houston's set included a medley of "Sweet Love", "Control", and "Stop to Love", also included was "Sweet Thing" on selected tour dates; like her previous tour, Houston included gospel songs in her set.
- September 2, 1987: the concert in Saratoga Springs, New York was aired with her performances for "I Wanna Dance With Somebody" and "Didn't We Almost Have It All" during the televised ceremony for the MTV Video Music Awards on September 11, 1987.
- September 8 and 9, 1987: the concerts at Madison Square Garden in New York City, Kenny G. was featured on stage playing saxophone while Houston performed "For The Love of You".
- October 12, 1987: during the concert in Portland, Oregon, Houston sang "Happy Birthday" a cappella to her brother and back-up singer.
- June 11, 1988: Houston performed a set of her hit songs at Wembley Stadium for an All star music concert titled "FreedomFest, Mandela Day" to celebrate Nelson Mandela's 70th Birthday.
- August 28, 1988: Houston performed a USA Benefit concert for The United Negro College Fund at Madison Square Garden in New York City. Whitney performed a medley of "When I First Saw You" / "Family" with brother Gary Houston and mother Cissy Houston as tribute to the Broadway musical, Dreamgirls. The medley was performed with Gary at selected cities in Europe and North America.

== Shows ==
List of concerts, showing date, city, country, venue, tickets sold, number of available tickets and amount of gross revenue
| Date | City | Country | Venue | Attendance | Revenue |
North America
| July 4, 1987 | Tampa | United States | Tampa Stadium | 49,659 / 55,000 | $883,551 |
| July 5, 1987 | Milwaukee | United States | Marcus Amphitheater | 23,178 / 23,178 | —N/a |
| July 7, 1987 | Canandaigua | United States | Finger Lakes Performing Arts Center | 12,500 / 12,500 | $186,280 |
| July 8, 1987 | Lake Placid | United States | Olympic Center Complex Arena | 8,000 / 8,000 | $131,291 |
| July 9, 1987 | Providence | United States | Providence Civic Center | 13,342 / 13,342 | $240,546 |
| July 11, 1987 | Columbia | United States | Merriweather Post Pavilion | —N/a | —N/a |
| July 12, 1987 | Columbia | United States | Merriweather Post Pavilion | —N/a | —N/a |
| July 14, 1987 | Cuyahoga Falls | United States | Blossom Music Center | 18,723 / 18,723 | $254,101 |
| July 17, 1987 | Indianapolis | United States | Market Square Arena | 14,000 / 14,000 | $231,682 |
| July 18, 1987 | Saint Paul | United States | Harriet Island Pavilion | —N/a | —N/a |
| July 19, 1987 | Saint Paul | United States | Harriet Island Pavilion | —N/a | —N/a |
| July 21, 1987 | Hoffman Estates | United States | Poplar Creek Music Theater | —N/a | —N/a |
| July 22, 1987 | Hoffman Estates | United States | Poplar Creek Music Theater | —N/a | —N/a |
| July 24, 1987 | Peoria | United States | Peoria Civic Center | 11,206 / 11,206 | $196,105 |
| July 25, 1987 | St. Louis | United States | St. Louis Arena | 10,491 / 19,398 | $194,084 |
| July 26, 1987 | Cincinnati | United States | Riverbend Music Center | —N/a | —N/a |
| July 27, 1987 | Cincinnati | United States | Riverbend Music Center | —N/a | —N/a |
| July 30, 1987 | Pittsburgh | United States | Civic Arena | 16,908 / 16,908 | $317,153 |
| July 31, 1987 | Clarkston | United States | Pine Knob Music Theatre | 28,287 / 28,287 | $481,680 |
| August 1, 1987 | Clarkston | United States | Pine Knob Music Theatre | 28,287 / 28,287 | $481,680 |
| August 2, 1987 | Pittsburgh | United States | Civic Arena | —N/a | —N/a |
| August 5, 1987 | Charlotte | United States | Charlotte Coliseum | 11,737 / 11,737 | $198,783 |
| August 7, 1987 | Birmingham | United States | Birmingham–Jefferson Civic Center | 16,000 / 16,000 | $255,658 |
| August 8, 1987 | Atlanta | United States | Omni Coliseum | 16,062 / 16,062 | $305,185 |
| August 9, 1987 | Greensboro | United States | Greensboro Coliseum | 12,624 / 15,781 | $219,981 |
| August 11, 1987 | Norfolk | United States | Norfolk Scope | | |
| August 12, 1987 | Richmond | United States | Richmond Coliseum | 10,386 / 10,386 | $175,945 |
| August 13, 1987 | Hershey | United States | Hersheypark Stadium | 22,000 / 22,000 | $377,055 |
| August 14, 1987 | Philadelphia | United States | The Spectrum | 18,800 / 18,800 | $348,674 |
| August 16, 1987 | Wantagh | United States | Jones Beach Marine Theater | 20,480 / 20,480 | $409,600 |
| August 17, 1987 | Wantagh | United States | Jones Beach Marine Theater | 20,480 / 20,480 | $409,600 |
| August 19, 1987 | Holmdel Township | United States | Garden State Arts Center | 21,356 / 21,356 | $366,276 |
| August 20, 1987 | Holmdel Township | United States | Garden State Arts Center | 21,356 / 21,356 | $366,276 |
| August 21, 1987 | Hartford | United States | Hartford Civic Center | 30,613 / 30,613 | $561,088 |
| August 22, 1987 | Hartford | United States | Hartford Civic Center | 30,613 / 30,613 | $561,088 |
| August 24, 1987 | Boston | United States | Boston Common | 36,000 / 36,000 | $732,478 |
| August 25, 1987 | Boston | United States | Boston Common | 36,000 / 36,000 | $732,478 |
| August 26, 1987 | Boston | United States | Boston Common | 36,000 / 36,000 | $732,478 |
| August 28, 1987 | Montreal | Canada | Montreal Forum | 16,348 / 16,348 | $287,395 |
| August 29, 1987 | Ottawa | Canada | Lansdowne Park | —N/a | —N/a |
| August 30, 1987 | Toronto | Canada | CNE Grandstand | 24,568 / 24,568 | $436,315 |
| September 2, 1987 | Saratoga Springs | United States | Saratoga Performing Arts Center | —N/a | —N/a |
| September 3, 1987 | Syracuse | United States | Onondaga War Memorial | 15,000 / 15,000 | $217,146 |
| September 5, 1987 | Providence | United States | Providence Civic Center | 13,415 / 13,415 | $240,934 |
| September 8, 1987 | New York City | United States | Madison Square Garden | 58,800 / 58,800 | $862,000 |
| September 9, 1987 | New York City | United States | Madison Square Garden | 58,800 / 58,800 | $862,000 |
| September 12, 1987 | Lexington | United States | Rupp Arena | 16,625 / 16,625 | $290,938 |
| September 18, 1987 | Austin | United States | Frank Erwin Center | 16,966 / 16,966 | $281,731 |
| September 19, 1987 | Houston | United States | The Summit | 17,000 / 17,000 | $294,591 |
| September 20, 1987 | Dallas | United States | Reunion Arena | 15,984 / 15,984 | $292,863 |
| September 23, 1987 | Albuquerque | United States | Tingley Coliseum | 10,626 / 10,626 | $189,583 |
| September 24, 1987 | Las Cruces | United States | Pan American Center | | |
| September 26, 1987 | Irvine | United States | Irvine Meadows Amphitheatre | 14,555 / 14,555 | $281,453 |
| September 27, 1987 | Mountain View | United States | Shoreline Amphitheatre | 16,113 / 16,113 | $280,089 |
| September 29, 1987 | Las Vegas | United States | Thomas & Mack Center | 11,787 / 14,000 | $224,071 |
| October 1, 1987 | Oakland | United States | Oakland–Alameda County Coliseum Arena | 14,803 / 14,803 | $273,856 |
| October 2, 1987 | Inglewood | United States | The Forum | 15,600 / 15,600 | $289,192 |
| October 9, 1987 | Seattle | United States | Seattle Center Coliseum | 29,417 / 29,417 | $535,249 |
| October 10, 1987 | Seattle | United States | Seattle Center Coliseum | 29,417 / 29,417 | $535,249 |
| October 11, 1987 | Vancouver | Canada | Pacific Coliseum | 16,500 / 16,500 | $279,720 |
| October 12, 1987 | Portland | United States | Memorial Coliseum Complex | 12,725 / 12,725 | $231,270 |
| October 27, 1987 | Denver | United States | McNichols Sports Arena | 13,673 / 16,000 | $262,277 |
| October 29, 1987 | Kansas City | United States | Kemper Arena | 12,799 / 13,105 | $206,316 |
| October 30, 1987 | Ames | United States | Hilton Coliseum | 12,500 / 12,500 | $212,853 |
| October 31, 1987 | Iowa City | United States | Carver–Hawkeye Arena | 14,000 / 14,000 | $243,828 |
| November 3, 1987 | Omaha | United States | Omaha Civic Auditorium | 10,859 / 10,859 | $197,118 |
| November 4, 1987 | Oklahoma City | United States | Myriad Convention Center Arena | 9,530 / 9,530 | $160,738 |
| November 8, 1987 | Champaign | United States | Assembly Hall | | |
| November 9, 1987 | Worcester | United States | Centrum in Worcester | 12,430 / 12,430 | $264,319 |
| November 10, 1987 | East Rutherford | United States | Brendan Byrne Arena | 17,257 / 17,257 | $335,818 |
| November 12, 1987 | New Haven | United States | New Haven Coliseum | | |
| November 14, 1987 | Morgantown | United States | WVU Coliseum | 14,060 / 14,060 | $224,174 |
| November 17, 1987 | Charleston | United States | Charleston Civic Center | —N/a | —N/a |
| November 19, 1987 | Murfreesboro | United States | Murphy Center | | |
| November 20, 1987 | Knoxville | United States | Stokely Athletic Center | 13,478 / 13,478 | $207,553 |
| November 21, 1987 | Chapel Hill | United States | Dean Smith Center | 9,633 / 20,991 | $168,578 |
| November 22, 1987 | Columbia | United States | Carolina Coliseum | | |
| November 25, 1987 | Memphis | United States | Mid-South Coliseum | | |
| November 27, 1987 | New Orleans | United States | Louisiana Superdome | | |
| November 28, 1987 | Biloxi | United States | Mississippi Coast Coliseum | | |
| November 29, 1987 | Tallahassee | United States | Tallahassee-Leon County Civic Center | | |
| December 1, 1987 | Auburn | United States | Memorial Coliseum | | |
| December 2, 1987 | Jacksonville | United States | Jacksonville Veterans Memorial Coliseum | | |
| December 4, 1987 | Tampa | United States | USF Sun Dome | 6,492 / 8,400 | $103,950 |
| December 5, 1987 | Pembroke Pines | United States | Hollywood Sportatorium | —N/a | —N/a |
| December 8, 1987 | Orlando | United States | Orange County Civic Center | —N/a | —N/a |
Oceania
| January 7, 1988 | Gold Coast | Australia | Village Theatre Sanctuary Cove | —N/a | —N/a |
Europe
| April 19, 1988 | Rotterdam | Netherlands | Rotterdam Ahoy | | |
| April 21, 1988 | Rotterdam | Netherlands | Rotterdam Ahoy | | |
| April 23, 1988 | Rotterdam | Netherlands | Rotterdam Ahoy | | |
| April 24, 1988 | Rotterdam | Netherlands | Rotterdam Ahoy | | |
| April 27, 1988 | Birmingham | England | NEC Arena | | |
| April 28, 1988 | Birmingham | England | NEC Arena | | |
| April 30, 1988 | Birmingham | England | NEC Arena | | |
| May 1, 1988 | Birmingham | England | NEC Arena | | |
| May 2, 1988 | Birmingham | England | NEC Arena | | |
| May 4, 1988 | London | England | Wembley Arena | | |
| May 5, 1988 | London | England | Wembley Arena | | |
| May 7, 1988 | London | England | Wembley Arena | | |
| May 10, 1988 | London | England | Wembley Arena | | |
| May 11, 1988 | London | England | Wembley Arena | | |
| May 12, 1988 | London | England | Wembley Arena | | |
| May 14, 1988 | London | England | Wembley Arena | | |
| May 15, 1988 | London | England | Wembley Arena | | |
| May 16, 1988 | London | England | Wembley Arena | | |
| May 18, 1988 | Paris | France | Palais omnisports de Paris-Bercy | | |
| May 20, 1988 | Frankfurt | West Germany | Festhalle Frankfurt | | |
| May 21, 1988 | Frankfurt | West Germany | Festhalle Frankfurt | | |
| May 24, 1988 | Copenhagen | Denmark | Valby-Hallen | | |
| May 25, 1988 | Drammen | Norway | Drammenshallen | | |
| May 27, 1988 | Stockholm | Sweden | Johanneshovs Isstadion | | |
| May 28, 1988 | Stockholm | Sweden | Johanneshovs Isstadion | | |
| May 29, 1988 | Gothenburg | Sweden | Scandinavium | 14,606 / 14,606 | |
| June 1, 1988 | West Berlin | West Germany | Waldbühne | | |
| June 4, 1988 | Dortmund | West Germany | Westfalenhallen | | |
| June 5, 1988 | Brussels | Belgium | Forest National | | |
| June 8, 1988 | Rome | Italy | Palazzo dello Sport | | |
| June 11, 1988 | London | England | Wembley Stadium | | |
| June 12, 1988 | Milan | Italy | Palatrussardi | | |
| June 16, 1988 | Vienna | Austria | Wiener Stadthalle | | |
| June 18, 1988 | Basel | Switzerland | St. Jakobshalle | | |
| June 19, 1988 | Basel | Switzerland | St. Jakobshalle | | |
| June 23, 1988 | Munich | West Germany | Olympiahalle | | |
| June 24, 1988 | Munich | West Germany | Olympiahalle | | |
| June 26, 1988 | Munich | West Germany | Olympiahalle | | |
| June 28, 1988 | Barcelona | Spain | Plaça de Toros La Monumental | | |
| June 29, 1988 | Madrid | Spain | Plaza de Toros de Las Ventas | | |
| July 1, 1988 | Monte Carlo | Monaco | Salle Des Etoiles Sporting Club | | |
| July 2, 1988 | Monte Carlo | Monaco | Salle Des Etoiles Sporting Club | | |
North America
| August 27, 1988 | New York City | United States | Madison Square Garden | 17,702 / 17,702 | $482,681 |
Asia
| September 21, 1988 | Hiroshima | Japan | Hiroshima Green Arena | —N/a | —N/a |
| September 22, 1988 | Fukuoka | Japan | Fukuoka Kokusai Center | —N/a | —N/a |
| September 26, 1988 | Tokyo | Japan | Nippon Budokan | —N/a | —N/a |
| September 27, 1988 | Tokyo | Japan | Nippon Budokan | —N/a | —N/a |
| September 28, 1988 | Tokyo | Japan | Nippon Budokan | —N/a | —N/a |
| September 30, 1988 | Osaka | Japan | Osaka-jō Hall | —N/a | —N/a |
| October 1, 1988 | Osaka | Japan | Osaka-jō Hall | —N/a | —N/a |
| October 2, 1988 | Osaka | Japan | Osaka-jō Hall | —N/a | —N/a |
| October 5, 1988 | Nagoya | Japan | Nagoya Rainbow Hall | —N/a | —N/a |
| October 6, 1988 | Nagoya | Japan | Nagoya Rainbow Hall | —N/a | —N/a |
| October 7, 1988 | Shizuoka | Japan | Kusanagi Athletic Stadium | —N/a | —N/a |
| October 11, 1988 | Sapporo | Japan | Makomanai Indoor Stadium | —N/a | —N/a |
| October 13, 1988 | Sendai | Japan | Sendai Gymnasium | —N/a | —N/a |
| October 15, 1988 | Yokohama | Japan | Yokohama Cultural Gymnasium | —N/a | —N/a |
| October 16, 1988 | Tokyo | Japan | Nippon Budokan | —N/a | —N/a |
| October 17, 1988 | Tokyo | Japan | Nippon Budokan | | |
Oceania
| October 22, 1988 | Melbourne | Australia | National Tennis Centre | —N/a | —N/a |
| October 25, 1988 | Canberra | Australia | National Indoor Sports Centre | —N/a | —N/a |
| October 26, 1988 | Canberra | Australia | National Indoor Sports Centre | —N/a | —N/a |
| October 31, 1988 | Perth | Australia | Perth Entertainment Centre | —N/a | —N/a |
| November 1, 1988 | Perth | Australia | Perth Entertainment Centre | —N/a | —N/a |
| November 7, 1988 | Sydney | Australia | Sydney Entertainment Centre | —N/a | —N/a |
| November 8, 1988 | Sydney | Australia | Sydney Entertainment Centre | | |
| November 11, 1988 | Brisbane | Australia | Brisbane Entertainment Centre | | |
Asia
| November 18, 1988 | Kowloon | British Hong Kong | Hong Kong Coliseum | —N/a | —N/a |
| November 19, 1988 | Kowloon | British Hong Kong | Hong Kong Coliseum | —N/a | —N/a |
| November 20, 1988 | Kowloon | British Hong Kong | Hong Kong Coliseum | —N/a | —N/a |
| Total | | | | 938,203 / 973,720 (96%) | $15,925,795 |

== Personnel ==
Band

- Musical director / piano – John Simmons
- Bass guitar / bass synthesizer – Rickey Minor
- Keyboards – Willard Meeks
- Saxophone – Jay Davidson
- Guitar – Steve Kelly
- Drums – Gregory Grainger
- Percussion – Kevin Jones
- Background vocalists – Gary Houston, Felicia Moss, Voneva Simms, Billy Baker

Choreography

- Choreographer – Damita Jo Freeman
- Assistant choreographer – Khandi Alexander

Dancers

- Frantz Hall, Leesa Humphrey, Raymond Delbarrio

Tour management

- Manager – Tony Bulluck

== Broadcast and recordings ==
- One of the Wembley Arena shows in London was recorded for a Whitney Houston 1988 Europe tour special and broadcast on Rai Uno TV in Italy. Performances from this show—"Love Will Save the Day", "Greatest Love of All", "He, I Believe" and "I Wanna Dance with Somebody" were featured in the tour special. There were no official recordings released to the public.
- The show at Sanctuary Cove, Queensland, Australia on January 7th, 1988 was filmed. No official recordings have been released to the public.
