= John Simmons (conductor) =

American songwriter

John Simmons (October 22, 1947 – March 16, 1989) was an American conductor, musical arranger, soul singer and keyboardist.

== Biography ==
Singer Whitney Houston's enormous popularity in the 1980s gave audiences a chance to see John Simmons in action during events such as the Moment of Truth World Tour. This conquest of the international pop music audience took place in 1987 and 1988, the last years of Simmons' life, but as a keyboardist as well as a vocalist himself, Simmons was Houston's musical director and backup bandleader, an assignment he had also previously carried out for Stephanie Mills. Simmons had his own taste of chart success as a member of the Reflections, a vocal group formed in New York City in the early 1970s. His background was in gospel, a talent that logically helped push him into R&B waters, as in the case of many other performers in these related styles. Melba Moore wanted a vocal group who could hold forth with credibility during a special gospel section of her live show, settling on Simmons and colleagues including his brother Edmund Simmons. The Reflections wound up touring with Moore for more than three years. The group then began recording on its own for the Capitol label. "Three Steps from True Love" became a hit, but the only one the group managed to have while active. "She's My Summer Breeze," upon what would have to be described as subsequent Reflections, eventually turned trendy on the British rare groove scene. Simmons discography also includes sideman appearances on recordings by Mills and Peggi Blu. His greatest stretch seems to have taken place on a Lead Belly tribute concert produced by avant-garde jazz composer Heiner Stadler.

He has been credited for Rickey Minor's success as well as Stephanie Mills first gold album, Whatcha Gonna Do With My Lovin' (1979).
