= Greatest Love of All (Whitney Houston recording) =

Single by Whitney Houston

from the album Whitney Houston
- B-side: "Thinking About You"
- Released: March 18, 1986
- Recorded: December 1984
- Genre: Pop; soul; R&B
- Length: 4:51 (album version); 4:56 (deluxe version)
- Label: Arista
- Composer: Michael Masser
- Lyricist: Linda Creed
- Producer: Michael Masser

Whitney Houston singles chronology
"How Will I Know" (1985)	"Greatest Love of All" (1986)	"I Wanna Dance with Somebody (Who Loves Me)" (1987)

Music video
- "Greatest Love of All" on YouTube

"Greatest Love of All" is a song recorded by American singer Whitney Houston. It is a cover of the original song written by Michael Masser and Linda Creed, and recorded by George Benson. Originally issued as the B-side of her solo debut hit "You Give Good Love" in February 1985, it was released by Houston's label Arista Records as the sixth single from her self-titled debut album on March 18, 1986.

The song found immediate success upon its release. In the United States, it became Houston's third consecutive number-one single on the Billboard Hot 100, where it would stay for three consecutive weeks, making her the first female artist to have three Hot 100 number-one singles from the same album. In Canada, it became Houston's second number-one single as well as in Ireland and her first chart-topper in Panama and Australia and would chart successfully in other countries, reaching the top ten in the United Kingdom and the top twenty in five other countries. The song earned Houston a Grammy Award nomination for Record of the Year at the 29th Annual Grammy Awards in 1987, her first nomination in that category.

The song has been featured on three of Houston's compilation albums since its release including Whitney: The Greatest Hits (both in its original version and as a dance remix), The Ultimate Collection and I Will Always Love You: The Best of Whitney Houston. Houston's 1990 live performance from the Arista 15th anniversary concert in Radio City Music Hall was included in the 25th anniversary deluxe edition of Whitney Houston and the 2014 CD/DVD release, Whitney Houston Live: Her Greatest Performances.

With over 8 million copies sold worldwide, the song was considered one of the first signature songs of her career while its music video was the first music video on MTV by a black female artist to debut to heavy rotation.

== Background ==
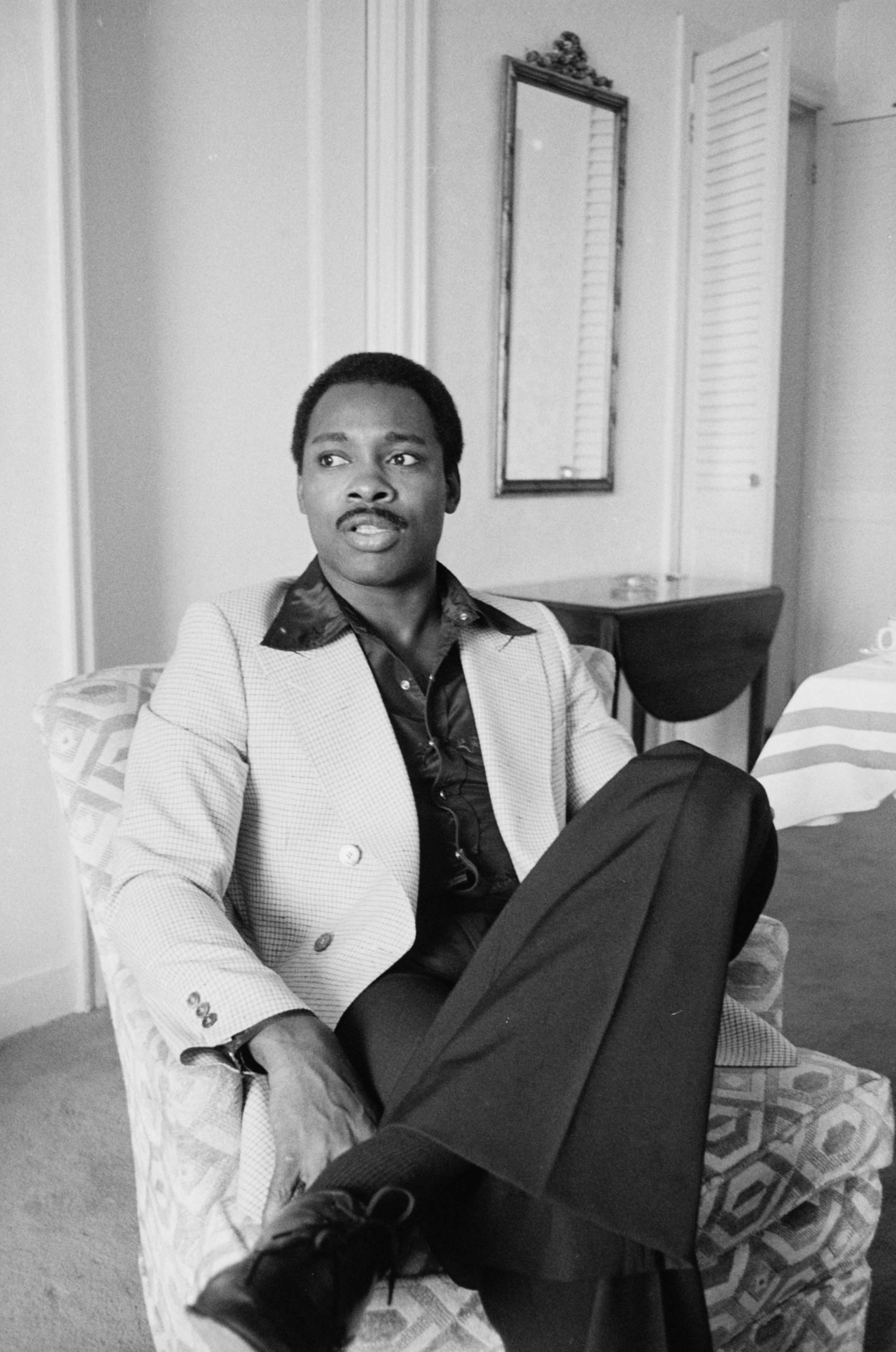
George Benson (pictured in 1977) was the original performer of "Greatest Love of All".

In 1977, 14-year-old Whitney Houston entered the Garden State Competition in her home state of New Jersey and became a finalist, competing against another young female vocalist for the win. Houston's song for the competition, as given to her by her mother Cissy Houston, was the Barbra Streisand ballad "Evergreen". Houston lost by technicality due to singing above the limit. Ironically, the girl who won had performed the song "The Greatest Love of All". Houston was also a fan of the song and eventually included it in her solo performances while singing in her mother's band.

By early 1983, the song had become a regular inclusion in Houston's short set list, along with other pop standards such as "Home" and "Tomorrow". That year, she had been spotted by Arista Records A&R man Gerry Griffith at the Manhattan jazz club Seventh Avenue South. Griffith, who had first caught Houston performing at another club in Manhattan two years earlier, was so impressed with her performance that the following day, he went to the office of Arista CEO Clive Davis and asked him to come see Houston's show. According to Davis, he caught a show with Whitney and her mother at the Sweetwater's jazz club. Upon hearing Houston perform "The Greatest Love of All", an impressed Davis decided to sign the aspiring 19-year-old singer.

For the first couple of months following Houston signing with the label in April 1983, the singer and Davis hosted showcases in nightclubs to seek producers without much success until Davis called producer Michael Masser to come to New York to see Houston performing "The Greatest Love of All", which he co-wrote with Linda Creed for George Benson in 1977 for the Muhammad Ali biopic, The Greatest.

At the time, Arista, which had been founded by Davis in late 1974, had won rights to produce the soundtrack of the Ali film and Masser, who had previously composed hits for Diana Ross, had been contacted by Davis to pen the film's theme song along with Creed, which in turn produced a long partnership between the two songwriters. Benson's version became a hit upon its release, reaching number 24 on the Billboard Hot 100 in October 1977 and became Arista's first top ten R&B hit, where it peaked at number two on the Hot Soul Singles chart.

Masser happened to walk in when Houston began performing the song. Upon hearing her sing the song, Masser was moved and convinced Davis to let Houston be the featured duet performer of Teddy Pendergrass's ballad, "Hold Me". Davis obliged under the condition Masser produce for Houston's debut, to which Masser agreed.

== Recording ==
Our young people need to hear that song and realize it’s about loving yourself. If you can love yourself through all your rights and wrongs and faults, then that’s the greatest love of all.

— Whitney Houston

According to the label, work on Houston's debut album took over a year. Initially budgeted for $200,000, it was now over the budget, approaching $400,000. Houston had insisted on recording the ballad sensing that it was important for music to have a positive message reaching people. Davis, however, refused, telling Houston that there were already too many ballads recorded.

Michael Masser, however, who had recently produced "Saving All My Love for You" and "All at Once" for Houston in the studio for her upcoming debut album, agreed with the singer, having wanted to record her singing the ballad after first catching her live performance. According to arranger Gene Page, Davis initially refused to have Masser record the song because Benson's version was only moderately successful on the pop charts.

Page claimed Davis was split between the four Masser songs recorded, liking "Hold Me" and "All at Once" and disliking "Greatest Love of All" and "Saving All My Love for You" but eventually decided to include the latter two songs after Masser refused to do anything else for Houston's album if he couldn't record them on the artist. Davis later warned the pair that it wouldn't be released as a single.

According to Houston, who was gaining a reputation as a single-take vocalist, Masser recorded 60 takes of the song during the December 1984 session, which drove a weary Houston to call Davis to tell him to end the session.

By the time Houston released her debut album in February 1985, famed songwriter Linda Creed, who had composed the song's lyrics two weeks after a 1977 mastectomy following her 1975 diagnosis with breast cancer, was dying of the disease and later became bed-ridden near the end of the year.

Creed would die from complications of breast cancer on April 10, 1986, just as Houston's version of the song entered the top 40 of the US pop charts.

=== Arrangement ===
According to the sheet notes provided by Warner Bros. Publications, Houston's rendition has a tempo of "slowly" with 68 beats per minute.

The song starts and mostly remains in the key of A-major, though during the second part of the choruses, it switches to D-major. Houston's vocal range goes from the low note of A_{3} to the high note of E_{5}. At the end of the song, Houston sustains a high belting note on the word "love" for 12 seconds.

== Critical reception ==
Many critics called the song the centerpiece of Houston's debut album. Stephen Holden of The New York Times wrote that "Houston sings it with a forceful directness that gives its message of self-worth an astounding resonance and conviction" and called the song a compelling assertion of spiritual devotion, black pride, and family loyalty, all at once.

Don Shewey of Rolling Stone wrote that as the song builds, Houston "slowly pours on the soul, slips in some churchy phrasing, holds notes a little longer and shows off her glorious voice."

In his March 7, 1985 review of Houston's debut, Liam Lacey of The Globe and Mail hailed the ballad, along with "Saving All My Love for You" and "Hold Me" as "some of the loveliest pop singing on vinyl since the glory days of Dionne Warwick."

In their March 22, 1986 issue on its "Singles Releases" page, Cashbox magazine called the song a "positive-think, optimistic anthem" that would "connect with her long and growing throng of fans".

In his retrospective of the song, Tom Breihan of Stereogum wrote that it "stands as an eternal monument to Houston's ballad-singing powers".

Alex Hopper of American Songwriter praised Houston's ability to "[shed] any vocal acrobatics for a simple arrangement that hits just as hard" with the song among her other signature ballads such as "Saving All My Love for You" and "I Will Always Love You".

== Commercial reception ==
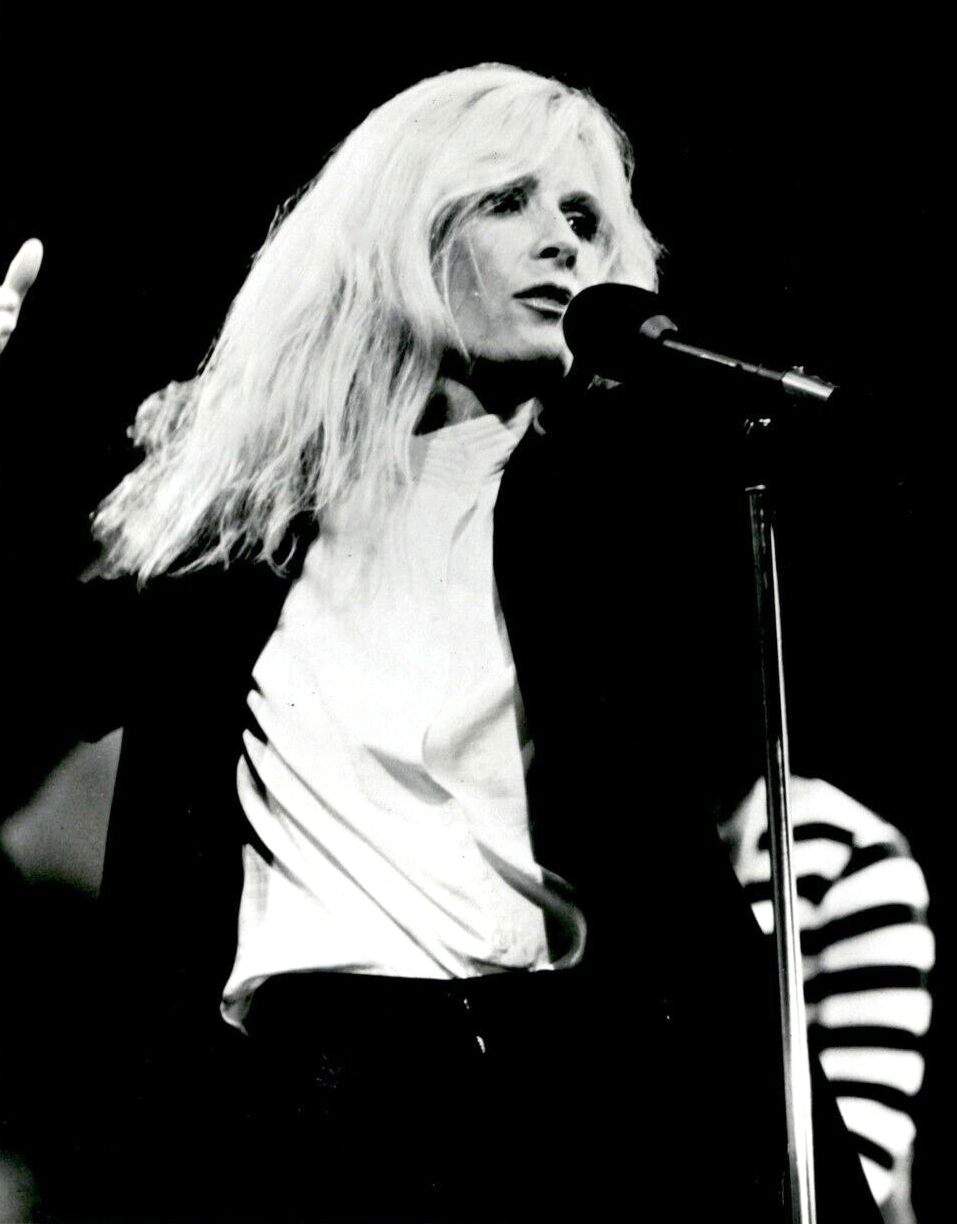
Houston became the first female artist since Kim Carnes (pictured in 1981) to simultaneously top the Billboard 200 and Billboard Hot 100 with her self-titled debut album and Greatest Love of All.

=== Chart performance ===
==== North America ====
Initially issued as the B-side of "You Give Good Love" in February 1985, after heavy airplay on radio stations across the country, the song became the sixth official release from the album on March 18, 1986. It entered the Billboard Hot 100 for the week of March 29 at number 54 as the "Hot Shot Debut" of that week. It entered the top 40 the following week (April 5). It became Houston's fourth top ten single in its sixth week for the issue dated May 3, 1986. Two weeks later, for the issue dated on May 17, it topped the Hot 100, becoming Houston's third consecutive number one single after "Saving All My Love for You" and "How Will I Know". It replaced the Pet Shop Boys' "West End Girls" at the top and would stay there for three consecutive weeks, becoming her longest running chart topper at the time. It was also Masser's fourth number one composition on the Billboard Hot 100 and Creed's first and only number one, despite helping to compose top ten hits for the likes of the Stylistics and the Spinners.

In the same week it topped the chart, Houston's album, Whitney Houston, returned to number one on the Billboard 200 having unseated Van Halen's 5150 from the top spot, making Houston the first female artist to do this since Kim Carnes achieved the same feat when her hit single, "Bette Davis Eyes", topped the Hot 100 while her album, Mistaken Identity also topped the Billboard 200 simultaneously in the same week in June 1981. It also topped the Billboard Adult Contemporary chart on the April 26, 1986 issue of Billboard, staying for five consecutive weeks, her longest running number one on the chart, later tied with "I Will Always Love You" nearly seven years later. It would peak at number three on the Hot Black Singles chart for the week of May 24, 1986, becoming her sixth top ten R&B hit in a row, making her the first solo recording artist to do so with her first six singles and the first in fifteen years since the Jackson 5 achieved this in 1970–71.

Due to this success, it made Houston the first female solo artist in history to produce three number one singles off a single album on the Billboard Hot 100. Houston's album was only the fourth album after the multi-artist soundtrack to Saturday Night Fever, the Bee Gees' Spirits Having Flown and Wham!'s Make It Big to accomplish this milestone.

During its initial run on the charts, it spent 14 weeks inside the top 40, including seven weeks in the top ten, spending an initial 18 weeks on the charts. In 2012, following her death, the song re-entered the Billboard Hot 100 at number 49 for the week of February 27 and moved up to number 36 the following week (March 3), giving Houston three posthumous top 40 singles along with "I Wanna Dance with Somebody (Who Loves Me)" and "I Will Always Love You", culminating in a total of twenty weeks.

In Canada, the song hit number one for the week of June 7, 1986, where it replaced Madonna's "Live to Tell" at the top spot, staying for a week. It was Houston's second number one single in the country after "How Will I Know" and her fourth consecutive top ten hit in the country.

==== Central America ====
In the Central American country of Panama, the song reached number one, becoming her first number one hit in that country.

==== Europe ====
In Europe, it was also successful. In the United Kingdom, it entered the singles chart on April 12, 1986, at number 46. Six weeks later, on May 17, it made its peak at number eight on the chart, becoming Houston's third top ten UK single. The song spent three weeks in the top ten and 11 cumulative weeks inside the top 75 during its first chart run. It briefly re-entered the chart at number 88 for the week of July 5, 1986.

In Ireland, it became her second chart-topping hit and also reached the top ten in Iceland and Luxembourg. It reached the top 20 in Italy, Finland, Sweden, the Netherlands Dutch Top 40 and Switzerland while reaching the top 30 in the Netherlands Single Top 100, Germany, Austria and Belgium. Due to this success in Europe, the song peaked at number 11 on the European singles chart.

Following Houston's death, the song re-entered the charts in the Netherlands, Switzerland and the United Kingdom, re-peaking at numbers 28, 55 and 58 respectively, with the latter peak charting for the week of February 25, 2012.

With its UK re-entry, Houston made history as it was one of twelve songs to simultaneously chart in the top 75 in the same week, setting an all-time UK chart record for a female artist, breaking the record set by Amy Winehouse, resulting in a Guinness World Record.

In addition, the song entered the singles charts in France and Spain for the first time after failing to enter the charts in its initial run. It peaked at number 70 in France and number 39 in Spain.

==== Oceania and Asia ====
In Oceania, the song was also successful, peaking at number 12 in New Zealand and topping the Australian Kent Music Report singles chart for the week of July 14, 1986.

In Australia, it helped her debut album top the official albums chart, making her the first black female artist to accomplish this feat.

Following Houston's death, the song re-entered the ARIA Singles Chart at number 56, one of six Houston songs to re-enter the chart.

In Asia, the song became a posthumous top 40 hit for Houston in Japan and South Korea, reaching number 34 on the Billboard Japan Hot 100 and number 26 on South Korea's Circle international singles chart.

=== Sales ===
The song has become one of Houston's best-selling and best performing singles of her career, eventually selling over eight million copies worldwide.

In the United States, it's her third biggest charting hit on the Billboard Hot 100 behind "I Will Always Love You" and "I Wanna Dance with Somebody (Who Loves Me).

In December 1995, nearly a decade after its release, the song was certified gold by the Recording Industry Association of America for physical sales of half a million copies. In March 2019, it was certified platinum for sales-equivalent units of a million copies. In January 2023, it was certified double platinum for sales of two million copies.

In Canada, it has been certified platinum in Canada for sales-equivalent units of over 80,000 copies.

In the United Kingdom, the song has been certified platinum for sales of over 600,000 copies and is one of ten platinum singles Houston had in the United Kingdom.

In New Zealand, it was certified gold for sales of over 15,000 copies.

== Copyright infringement lawsuit and settlement ==
In April 1987, Gordon Lightfoot filed a lawsuit against Michael Masser, alleging that Masser's song "The Greatest Love of All" stole twenty-four bars from Lightfoot's 1970 hit "If You Could Read My Mind".

According to Maclean's, Lightfoot commented, "It really rubbed me the wrong way. I don't want the present-day generation to think that I stole my song from him."

Lightfoot has stated that he dropped the suit when he felt it was having a negative effect on Houston, as the suit was about Masser and not her.

Ultimately the case was settled out of court and Masser issued a public apology.

== Music video ==
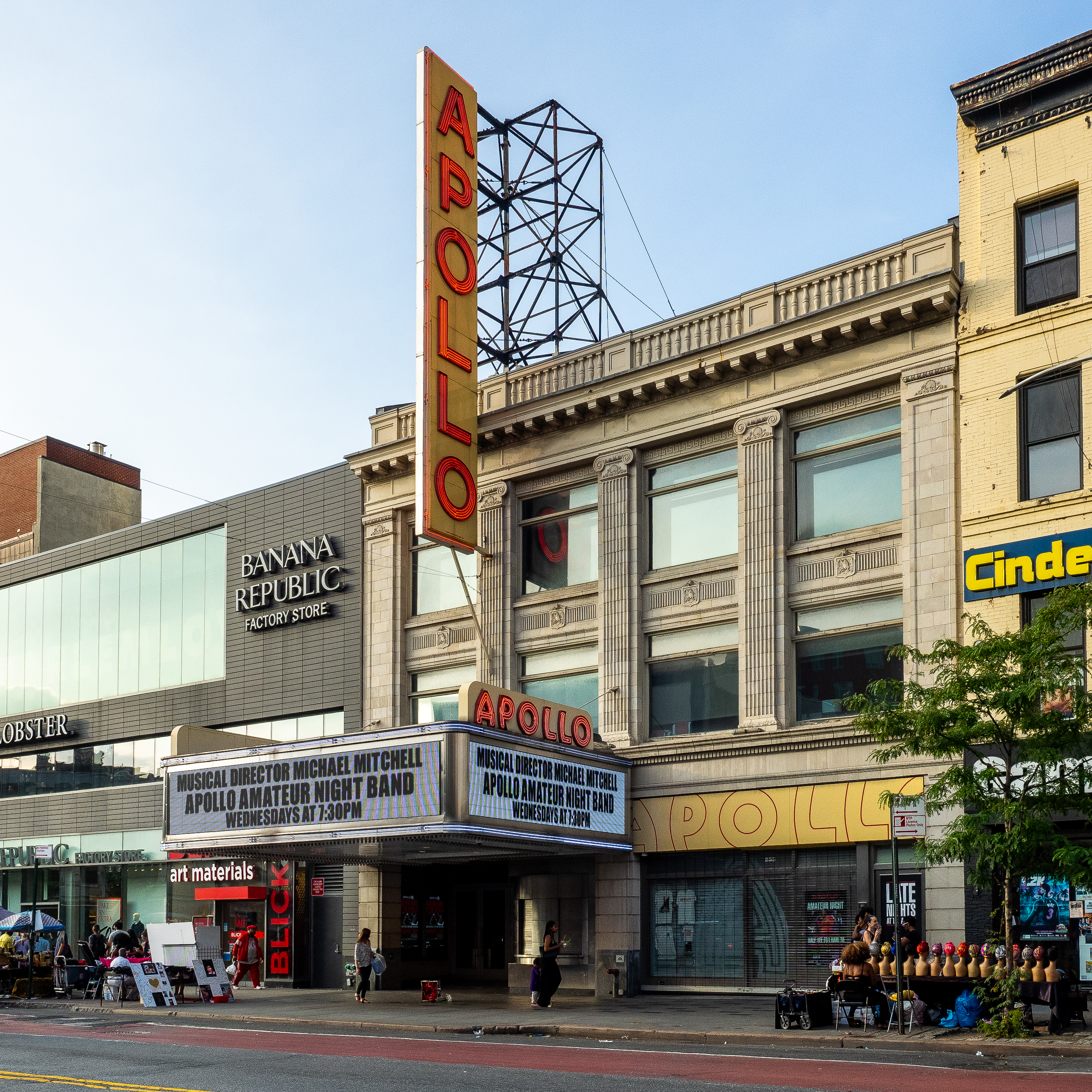
The music video for Greatest Love of All was one of the first music videos to be shot at the Apollo Theater.

Houston's music video for "Greatest Love of All" was filmed at Harlem's Apollo Theater in New York City. In the video, she is a successful singer who is about to perform in front of an audience. She reminisces about the time when she was a child performing in a talent competition and receiving encouragement from her mother.

As a child, Houston had witnessed her mother Cissy Houston perform at the theater when her group The Sweet Inspirations were active.

The video features Cissy playing herself supporting a young Houston (played by Keara Hailey Gordon), as well as hugging present Houston at the end of the video.

It was directed by Peter Israelson, filmed with James Contner as DP and Steadicam operator Robin Buerki shooting 35mm film. Israelson would go on to direct Houston in two more music videos for her hits "Where Do Broken Hearts Go" and "All the Man That I Need".

At this point in her career, Houston had broken through on MTV with the music videos to "Saving All My Love for You" and "How Will I Know", the latter of which becoming one of the most played videos of 1986, later winning her an MTV Video Music Award.

During the making of the video, Houston was interviewed by MTV about the music video and later filmed a commercial promoting the channel while on set.

It was her first music video to receive a world premiere from the channel and debuted on heavy rotation for the week of March 26, 1986, the first music video by a black female artist to do so.

The video was credited by MTV for "help[ing] to cement the M.O. for the classic Whitney video."

In February 2020, the music video was restored in 4K on Houston's YouTube channel. The video has accumulated over 400 million views on YouTube.

In June 2020, during Black Music Month, Houston's estate premiered the official lyric video for the song featuring vintage clips of black American families and also included vintage clips of Houston performing the song.

== Accolades ==
Houston won the American Music Award for Favorite Soul/R&B Video Single for the music video in 1987.

The song was nominated for a Grammy Award for Record of the Year losing out to Steve Winwood's original rendition of "Higher Love" at the 1987 ceremony. It was Houston's first Record of the Year Grammy nomination.

"Greatest Love of All" also received a Soul Train Music Award nomination at the inaugural 1987 ceremony for Soul Train Music Award for Single of the Year, Female, losing the award to Anita Baker's "Sweet Love".

Billboard ranked the ballad as the 11th best-selling single of 1986. Cashbox ranked it the 13th biggest single of 1986 on its year-end list.

== Live performances ==
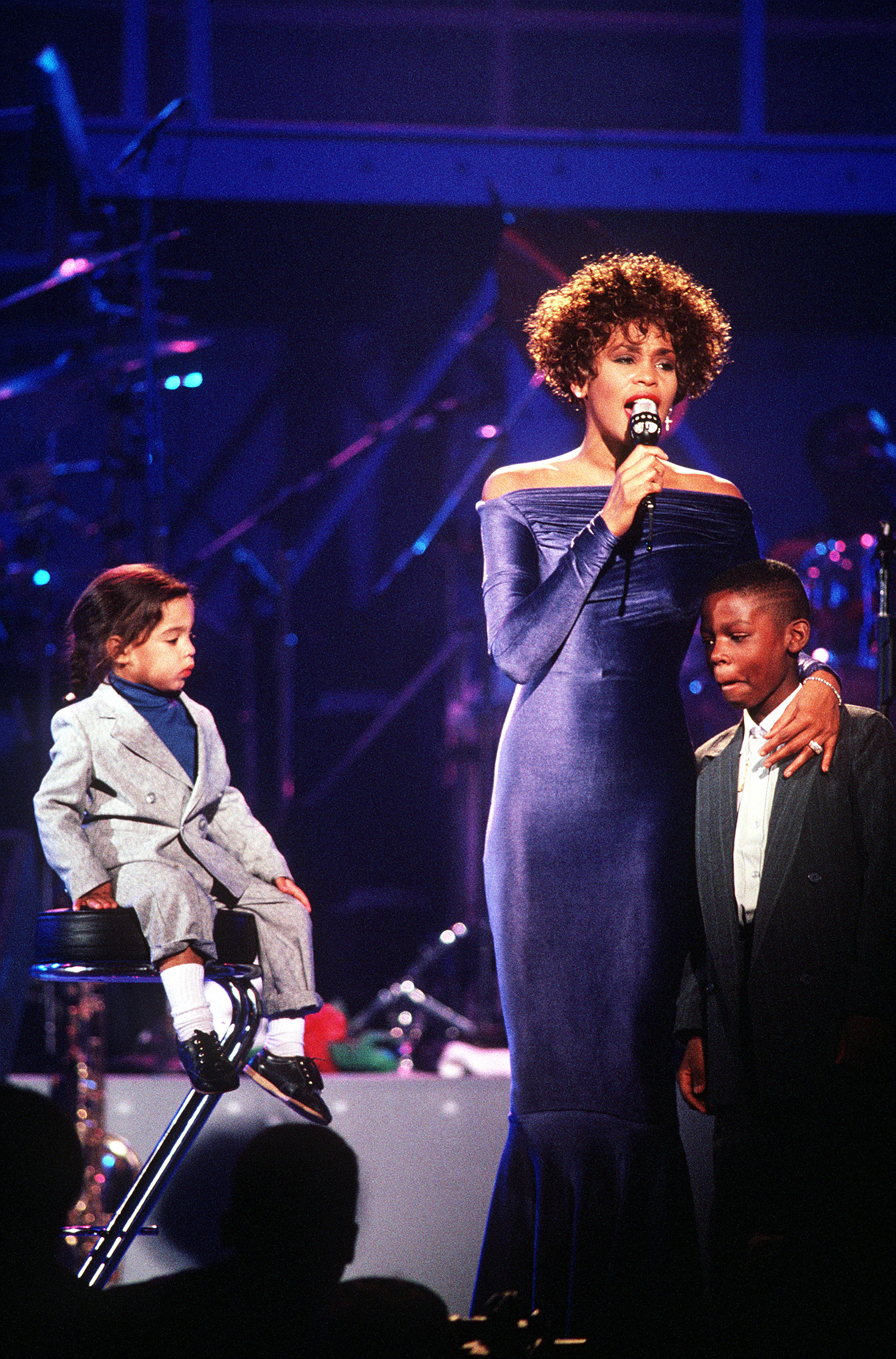
Houston performing Greatest Love of All during the Welcome Home Heroes with Whitney Houston concert in 1991.

Houston, who often called the ballad the favorite of her songs to perform, would perform the song on all of her regional and world tours. During the US Summer Tour (1985) and the Greatest Love World Tour (1986), she would open the shows with the bridge and close the show by performing a slowed-down gospel-influenced rendition.

In May 1987, Houston performed the song for the Linda Creed Memorial Scholarship Fund Concert in tribute to Creed at the late songwriter's hometown of Philadelphia.

On the Moment of Truth World Tour (1987–88), it would be the next-to-last song before she'd return onstage to perform "I Wanna Dance with Somebody (Who Loves Me)". Houston repeated this pattern on the Feels So Right tour in 1990. It was the last song she'd perform during the I'm Your Baby Tonight World Tour (1991) though occasionally she had encores. For her expansive world tour for her successful soundtrack to The Bodyguard, she opened the show with the first verse and chorus, arriving through a silhouette. During the South African leg of the tour, the song would be performed in full as part of a three-song encore.

Houston mostly left it out of the set list of her My Love Is Your Love World Tour in 1999; the singer later explained to John Norris, correspondent for MTV that it was cut due to both the tour length and the sales comparison of her later hit "I Will Always Love You". However, she would perform the song during a 1999 show at Sportpaleis in Antwerp. In later tours such as the Soul Divas Tour (2004) and her final concert tour, the Nothing but Love World Tour (2009–2010), she placed the ballad as a part of a medley of her classic love songs.

Houston also performed it live on television, first doing so on the Dutch TV show, Show van de maand on April 19, 1985. On July 4, 1986, Houston performed a stirring rendition of the song at the Americana music concert during Liberty Weekend.

In September 1986, Houston performed the song along with "How Will I Know" at the 1986 MTV Video Music Awards, with Marie Claire calling her performance of the ballad "chills-inducing". Her performance of the songs have been cited as one of the greatest performances in VMA history.

At the 29th Annual Grammy Awards, Houston performed the song in her second straight appearance. The performance was added in Rolling Stone's list of ten of her greatest performances, writing that the performance transformed her "from rising talent to a full-fledged superstar." A performance of the song at London's Wembley Arena in May 1988 was first broadcast on an Italian TV documentary on Houston on Rai Uno.

Houston ended her set at the Nelson Mandela 70th Birthday Tribute at London's Wembley Stadium with the song on June 11, 1988, in front of over 72,000 fans to help raise awareness of the anti-apartheid movement in South Africa.

A January 7, 1990, performance at the Yokohama Arena in Yokohama, Japan was recorded and broadcast on Japanese television.

Houston gave an acclaimed performance of the song at the That's What Friends Are For: Arista's 15th Anniversary Concert special, held at Radio City Music Hall on March 17, 1990, which aired on CBS on April 7, 1990. The performance ended in a standing ovation from the audience.

Houston returned to Japan that year in March 1991 and a March 15 performance of the song during Houston's concert at Yokohama Arena was also recorded and broadcast on Japanese television.

Houston performed the song at her acclaimed HBO-TV concert special, Welcome Home Heroes with Whitney Houston, with the song while surrounded by a couple of children of American troops returning from the Persian Gulf War on March 31, 1991.

In May 1991, Houston sent a live recorded performance of the song at the Oakland Arena in Oakland, California for The Simple Truth: A Concert for Kurdish Refugees.

A year later, in February 1992, Houston performed the song in tribute to Muhammad Ali for the Muhammad Ali's 50th Birthday Celebration TV special, which resulted in a standing ovation and moved the former heavyweight boxing champion out of his seat to embrace Houston.

That same year, on Houston's first TV special, This Is My Life, which aired on ABC on May 6, Houston is seen performing the song during a rehearsal.

In February 1994, Houston performed the song for Clive Davis at the American Cinema Awards before presenting him with the Gloria Swanson Humanitarian Award.

In July 1994, Houston performed the song in a thirty-minute halftime performance during the 1994 FIFA World Cup finals along with five of her other classics, including "I Wanna Dance with Somebody (Who Loves Me)" and "I Will Always Love You", in front of her largest concert audience of over 92,000 at the Rose Bowl in Pasadena, California.

In October of the same year, Houston performed the song in front of recently elected South African President Nelson Mandela at the White House state dinner, which was broadcast on the political channel C-SPAN.

Houston also performed the ballad on her second and third HBO concert specials, Whitney: The Concert for a New South Africa and Classic Whitney in 1994 and 1997 respectively.

She also performed the song in Brunei for the Whitney: Brunei The Royal Wedding Celebration special on August 24, 1996.

Houston's final televised performance of the song was on the Oprah Winfrey Show in June 1999.

== Covers and usage in media ==
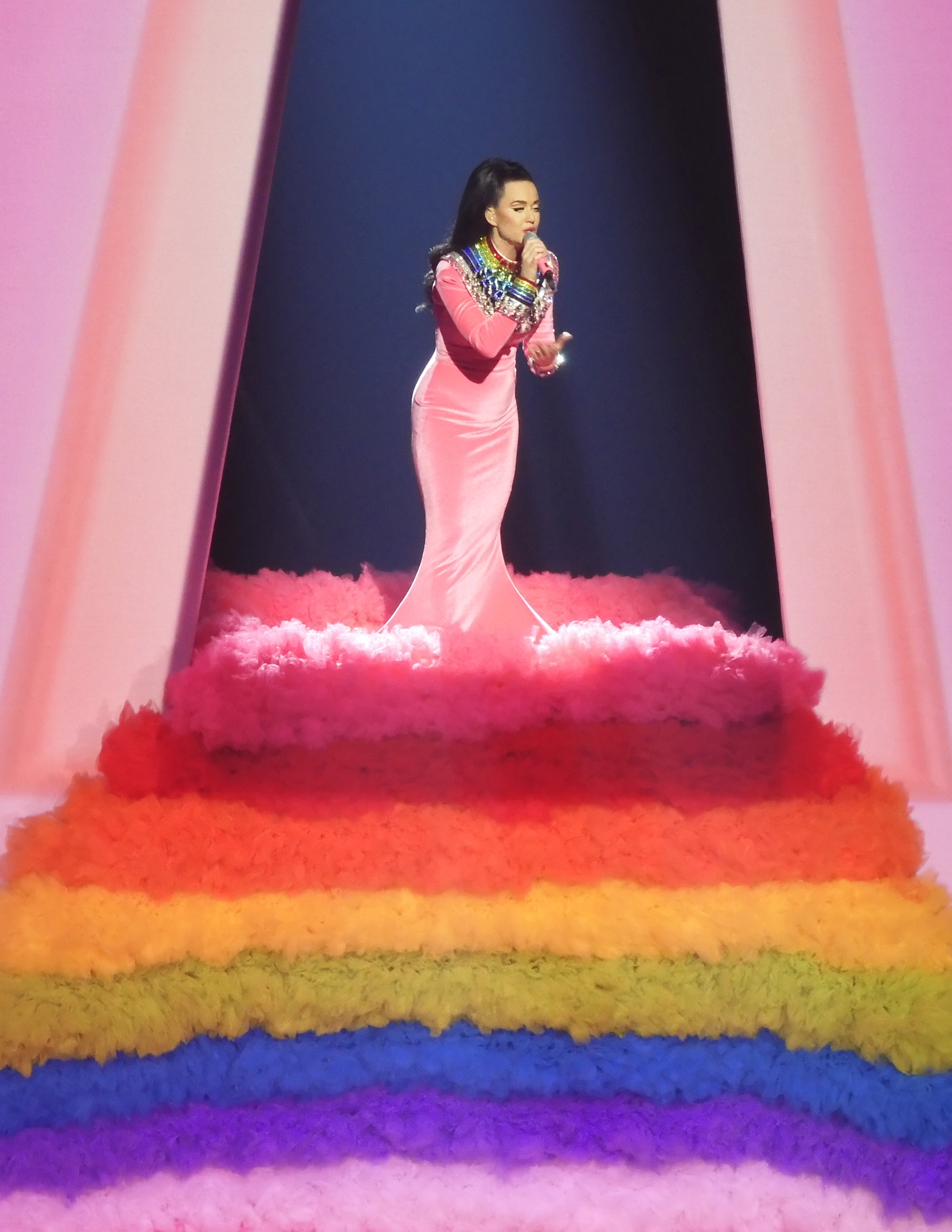
Katy Perry performing "Greatest Love of All" at the Play tour in tribute to Houston.

A number of other artists have covered Houston's rendition of the song, including Shirley Bassey, Oleta Adams, Alexandra Burke, Deborah Cox, Lea Salonga, Tim Seelig, Portrait, Kevin Rowland, Mindless Self Indulgence and Rahsaan Patterson during his tenure with Kids Incorporated. According to the sampling database site, WhoSampled, the Houston rendition has been covered 59 times, twice many the covers for the original Benson rendition.

Singer Katy Perry, a fan of Houston's, has at least performed the Houston rendition at several public events, including during her Play residency in Las Vegas in January 2022 where she merged the tune with her own hit, "Firework". During Kamala Harris' 2024 presidential campaign in Pittsburgh, Perry took the stage to give a full performance of the song.

At the 2012 NAACP Image Awards, Kirk Franklin and The Family started their tribute performance of Houston by performing "Greatest Love of All".

During the Recording Academy tribute to Houston, We Will Always Love You: A Grammy Salute to Whitney Houston, the song was performed by Celine Dion, a longtime admirer of Houston's. Dion had also performed the same song on Canadian television as a teenage singer over 25 years before.

Houston's rendition of the song was featured in the first season of RuPaul's Drag Race, being performed by contestants Akashia and Shannel in a "lipsync for your life" competition.

It was also parodied in the 1988 film, Coming to America, starring Eddie Murphy, who portrayed singer Randy Watson in the performance clip with his band Sexual Chocolate and performed a rendition that is received by a muted response outside of one person.

In the Houston-estate approved biopic, Whitney Houston: I Wanna Dance with Somebody (2022), the song is performed during the scene where Houston, played by Naomi Ackie, is told by her mother Cissy (Tamara Tunie) to sing the song after spotting Clive Davis (Stanley Tucci) in the audience at Sweetwater's, which reenacts Davis' real-life discovery of Houston performing the song, leading to her signing with Arista shortly thereafter.

The song was sampled by the Jungle Brothers on their 1989 track "Beeds on a String" and Shindy on his 2019 track "Road2Goat".

The song was at least remixed three times — first in 2000 by Junior Vasquez for the Houston compilation, Whitney: The Greatest Hits, by Peter Rauhofer that same year under the moniker Club 69, and in 2022 by Jax Jones for the official soundtrack to Houston's biopic.

== Legacy and influence ==
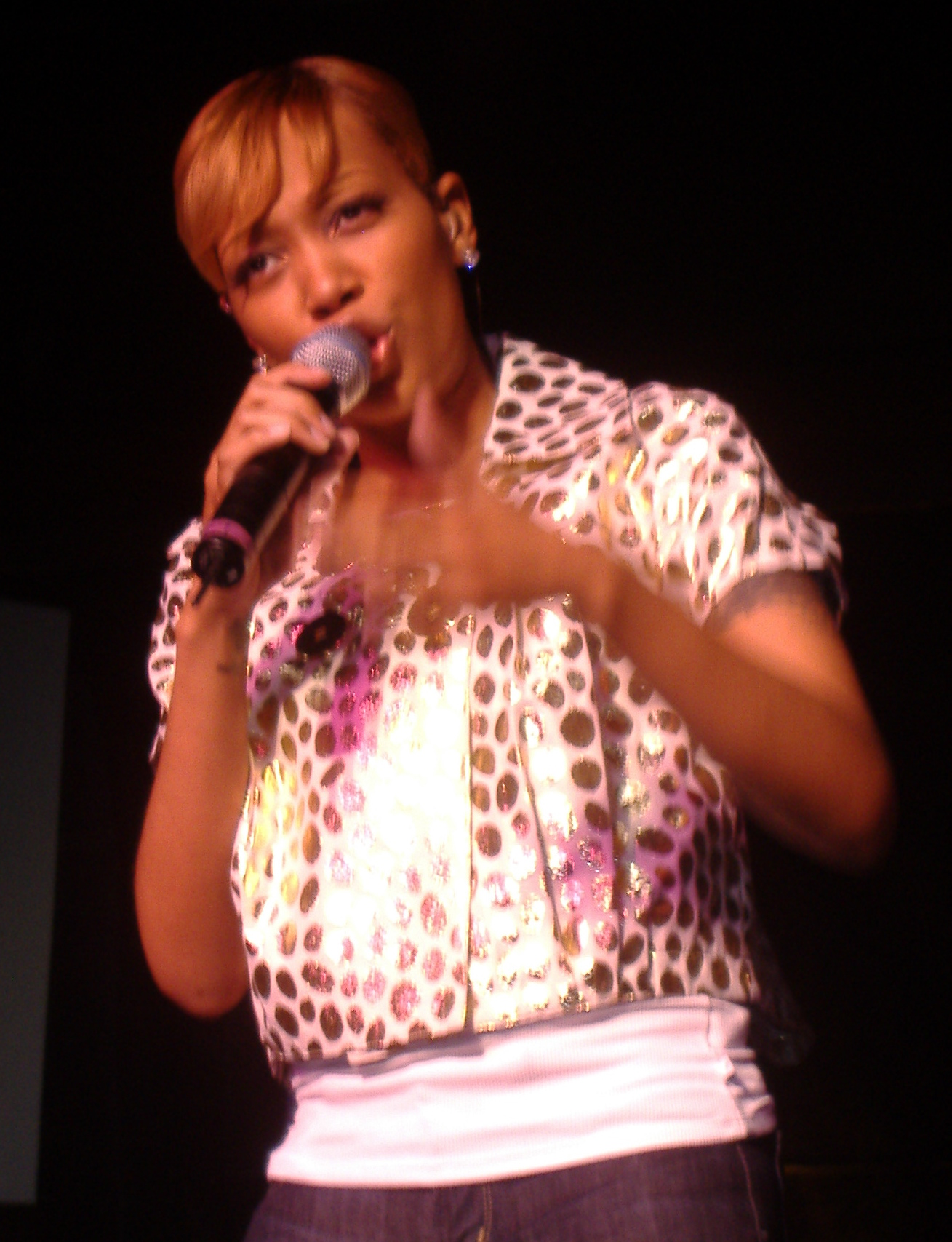
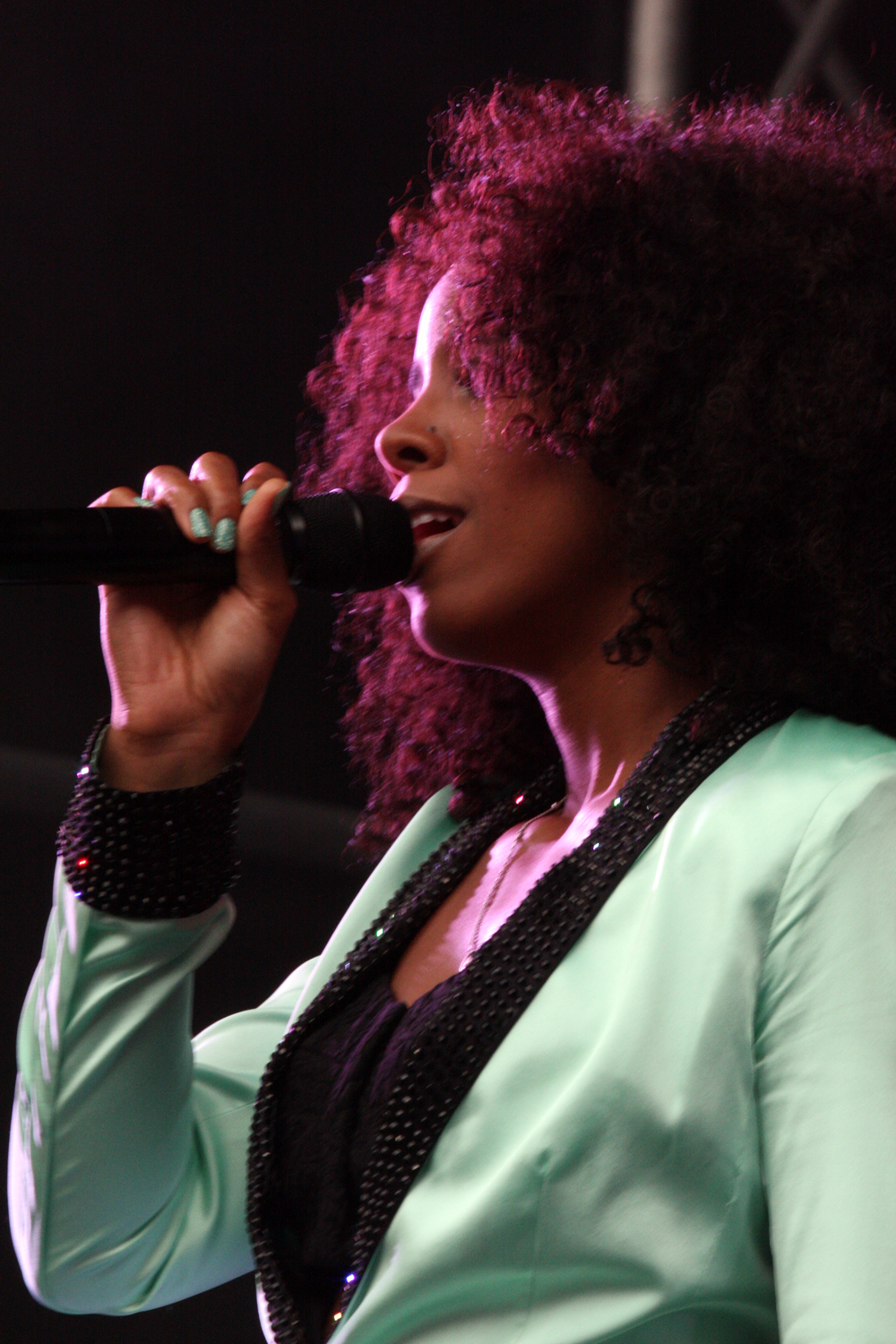
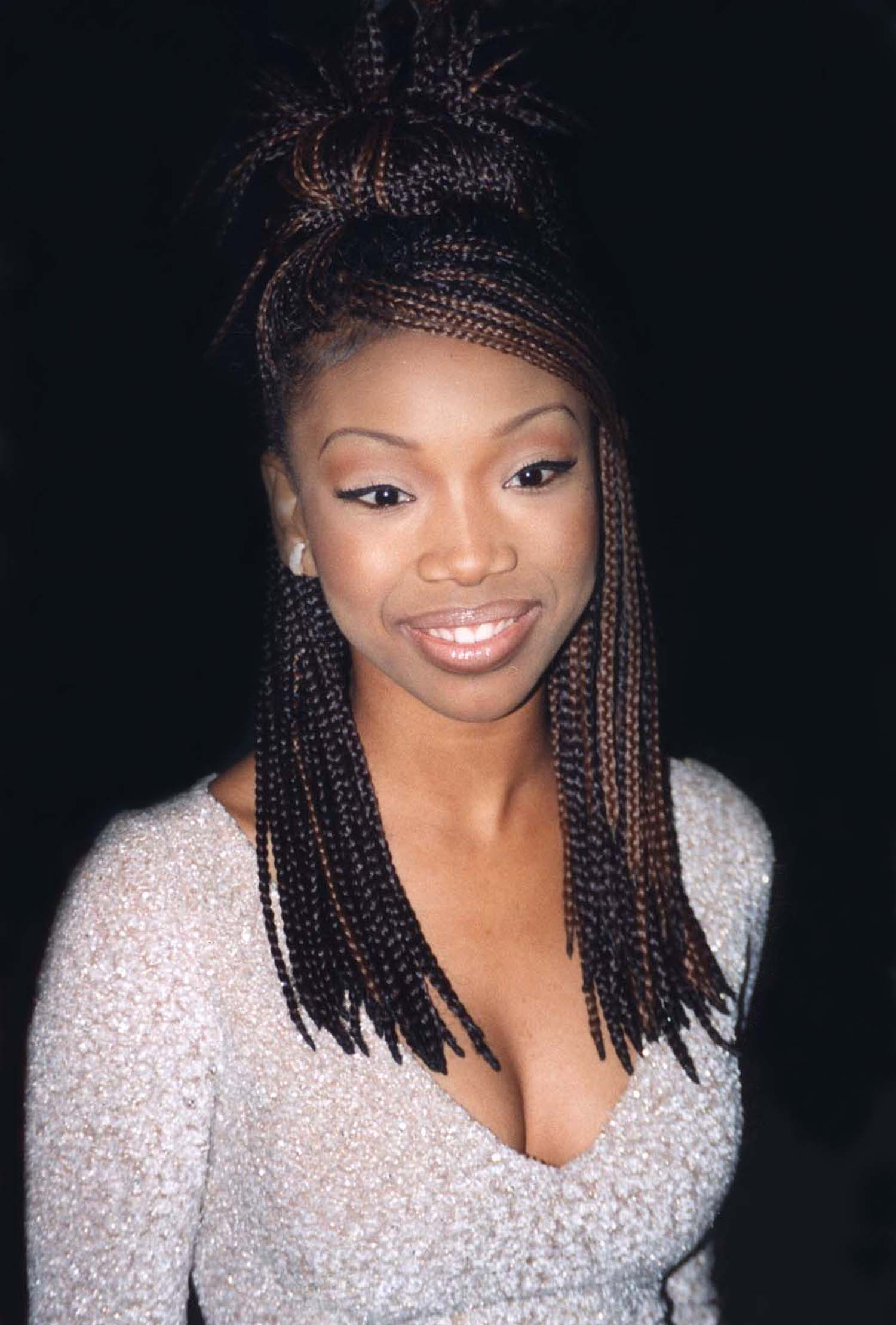
Singers Monica, Kelly Rowland and Brandy cited the song for shaping their careers.

Writing for the Seattle Post-Intelligencer, Justin Kantor in his article celebrating Houston's legacy following her death stated that "Greatest Love of All" "forever secure[d] [Houston's] prominent place in universal pop culture and the lives of countless millions... bec[oming] the soundtrack to graduations and celebrations of achievements everywhere."

Tom Breihan of Stereogum stated, "entire generations of R&B singers learned their craft from hearing what Houston did on songs like [Greatest Love of All]".

The song played a pivotal role in the career of American singer Monica as a 1991 performance of the song helped her to get discovered by record producer Dallas Austin and signed to his record label Rowdy Records, where her career was launched a few years later.

The song and its video also played a pivotal role in future Destiny's Child founding member Kelly Rowland's career as well. In a June 2006 feature article on Ebony magazine celebrating black music, Rowland stated, "[I] wanted to be a singer after I saw Whitney Houston on TV singing 'Greatest Love of All'. I wanted to sing like Whitney Houston in that red dress... and I have never, ever forgotten that song [Greatest Love of All]. I learned it backward, forward, sideways. The video still brings chills to me. When you wish and pray for something as a kid, you never know what blessings God will give you."

Fellow R&B singer Brandy was inspired and influenced to become a professional singer after watching the music video to the song at the age of seven, telling her mother, "I'm gonna be just like Whitney Houston when I grow up." Brandy wrote, "Watching how Whitney wielded her instrument, how her voice reached into people’s chests and rearranged things inside them, flipped a switch deep within me. I knew with bone-deep certainty what I wanted — no, what I was born to do. I was born to sing like Whitney. I was born to make people feel the way she made me feel."

In his September 1993 review of fellow pop-R&B singer Mariah Carey's hit "Hero", Paul Gettelmen of the Orlando Sentinel compared the song to "Greatest Love of All", criticizing "Hero" as a "rip-off" of Houston's song. Stephen Holden of Rolling Stone also noted an inspiration and similarity to "Greatest Love of All".

In his retrospective review of Houston's debut album, Stephen Thomas Erlewine of AllMusic cited "Greatest Love of All" as "providing the blueprint for decades of divas".

Following Michael Masser's death in 2015, The Telegraph ranked "Greatest Love of All" his third best song after "Saving All My Love for You" and "Touch Me in the Morning".

Forbes ranked the song third place among the 20 greatest Whitney Houston songs of all time.

MTV placed the song as one of the ten best Houston songs with correspondent Kelley L. Carter calling it "her musical calling card".

BET ranked the song the second best Whitney Houston song out of forty recordings, calling it Houston's "superstar-making moment", further explaining that the song was "one of her greatest and earliest triumphs -- soaring, uplifting and heartbreaking all at the same time".

Billboard ranked the song number nine in their 25 best Whitney Houston songs list. The same magazine ranked the song the 41st best love song of all time in 2025.

The Guardian voted the song as Houston's ninth greatest song, comparing it to the Benson original, saying "[Benson's version] is fine, a big tearjerking MOR ballad fit to climax a movie, which it did. But Houston turned it into a showstopper; there's a force and power to her delivery that immediately makes the original sound lacking."

Smooth Radio ranked it the ninth best Whitney Houston song in their list.

Rod Couch ranked the rendition the 144th greatest song of the rock era, her second-ranked song out of six Houston songs on Couch's book, The Top 500 Songs of the Rock Era 1955-2015.

About.com ranked it the second best Whitney Houston song of all time.

In 2012, Rolling Stone ranked it the greatest Whitney Houston song of all time among the music publication's readers, calling the song "an expression of monumental self-belief in the face of great adversity".

== Track listings ==
- US 7-inch vinyl single

A: "Greatest Love of All" – 4:51
B: "Thinking About You" – 4:06

- UK 12-inch vinyl maxi single

A1: "Greatest Love of All" – 4:49
B1: "Thinking About You" – 4:03
B2: "Shock Me" (duet with Jermaine Jackson) – 5:05

- Spain 12-inch vinyl maxi single

A1: "Greatest Love of All" – 4:49
B1: "Someone for Me" – 4:58
B2: "Thinking About You" – 4:07

- Japanese CD single
1. "Greatest Love of All" – 4:51
2. "Thinking About You" – 4:03

== Charts ==
=== Weekly charts ===
Chart (1986–1987)	Peak position
Australia (Kent Music Report)	1
Austria (Ö3 Austria Top 40)	25
Belgium (Ultratop 50 Flanders)	31
Canada Top Singles (RPM)	1
Canada Retail Singles (The Record)	3
Canada Adult Contemporary (RPM)	1
Denmark (IFPI)	14
Europe (European Hot 100 Singles)	11
Finland (Suomen virallinen lista)	16
Iceland (RÚV)	4
Ireland (IRMA)	1
Luxembourg (Radio Luxembourg)	9
Netherlands (Dutch Top 40)	17
Netherlands (Single Top 100)	24
New Zealand (Recorded Music NZ)	12
Panama (UPI)	1
Quebec (ADISQ)	1
Sweden (Sverigetopplistan)	14
Switzerland (Schweizer Hitparade)	20
UK Singles (Official Charts)	8
US Billboard Hot 100	1
US Adult Contemporary (Billboard)	1
US Hot R&B/Hip-Hop Songs (Billboard)	3
West Germany (GfK)	30

Chart (2012)	Peak position
Australia (ARIA)	56
Canada Digital Song Sales (Billboard)	39
France (SNEP)	70
Japan Hot 100 (Billboard)	34
Netherlands (Single Top 100)	28
New Zealand (Recorded Music NZ)	40
South Korea International (Circle)	26
Spain (Promusicae)	39
Switzerland (Schweizer Hitparade)	55
UK Singles (Official Charts)	58
US Billboard Hot 100	36

Chart (2026)	Peak position
Jamaica Airplay (JAMMS)	4

=== Year-end charts ===
Chart (1986)	Position
Australia (Kent Music Report)	27
Brazil (Mais Tocadas)	1
Canada Top Singles (RPM)	20
UK Singles (OCC)	96
US Top Pop Singles (Billboard)	11
US Top Adult Contemporary Singles (Billboard)	7
US Top Black Singles (Billboard)	46

== Certifications ==
Region	Certification	Certified units/sales
Canada (Music Canada)	Platinum	80,000^{‡}
New Zealand (RMNZ)	Gold	15,000^{‡}
United Kingdom (BPI)	Platinum	600,000^{‡}
United States (RIAA)	2× Platinum	2,000,000^{‡}
^{‡} Sales+streaming figures based on certification alone.
