= I Am Love (album) =

Studio album by Peabo Bryson
- Released: November 1981
- Recorded: 1980–1981
- Studios: Web IV Studios (Atlanta, Georgia); Strings recorded at Capitol Studios (Hollywood, California)
- Genres: Soul, funk, post-disco
- Length: 42:58
- Label: Capitol Records
- Producers: Johnny Pate; Peabo Bryson

Peabo Bryson chronology
Turn the Hands of Time (1981)	I Am Love (1981)	Don't Play with Fire (1982)

I Am Love is the seventh studio album by American recording artist Peabo Bryson, released in 1981 under Capitol Records. The album features singles, "There's No Guarantee" and the top ten R&B hit, "Let the Feeling Flow".

== Reception ==
Professional ratings
Review scores
Source	Rating
AllMusic	3.5/5 stars

The lead single "Let the Feeling Flow", became Bryson's highest charting pop single at that time. The song reached #42 on Billboard's Top Pop Singles. "I Am Love" peaked to #40 on Billboard's Top Pop Albums, earning his second top 40 pop album following 1979's Crosswinds (at #35).

== Track listing ==
- All songs written by Peabo Bryson, "Move Your Body" written by Charles Bryson and Peabo Bryson.
1. "I Am Love" - 5:08
2. "Move Your Body" - 4:30
3. "Split Decision" - 5:17
4. "Impossible" - 5:49
5. "There's No Guarantee" - 4:30
6. "Love is on the Rise" - 3:52
7. "Let the Feeling Flow" - 4:38
8. "Get Ready to Cry" - 4:17
9. "You" - 4:37

== Personnel ==
Musicians

- Peabo Bryson – lead vocals, backing vocals, acoustic piano
- Vance Taylor – Fender Rhodes, backing vocals
- Mark Parrish – synthesizers
- Richard Horton – guitars, guitar synthesizer
- Dwight W. Watkins – bass, backing vocals, bass solo (2)
- Andre Robinson – drums
- Chuck Bryson – percussion, backing vocals
- Ron Dover – tenor saxophone, tenor sax solo (3, 5, 8)
- Daniel Dillard – trombone
- Thaddeus Johnson – trumpet
- Dorothy Ashley – harp
- Terry Dukes – backing vocals

Music arrangements

- Peabo Bryson – BGV arrangements, horn arrangements, rhythm arrangements, string arrangements
- Johnny Pate – string arrangements and conductor
- Phil Wright – string contractor
- Gerard Vinci – concertmaster

Production

- Peabo Bryson – producer, mixing
- Johnny Pate – producer, mixing
- Ed Seay Jr. – engineer, mixing
- Tommy Cooper – assistant engineer
- Rik Pekkonen – string engineer
- Jim Loyd – mastering at Masterfonics (Nashville, Tennessee)
- Roy Kohara – art direction
- Roland Young – design
- Bobby Holland – photography
- David McCoy Franklin & Associates – management

== Charts ==
Chart (1981)	Peak position
US Billboard 200	40
US Top R&B/Hip-Hop Albums (Billboard)	6
