= Let the Feeling Flow =

Single by Peabo Bryson

from the album I Am Love
- Released: October 1981
- Genre: R&B, pop
- Length: 4:38
- Label: Capitol
- Songwriter: Peabo Bryson
- Producers: Johnny Pate, Peabo Bryson

Peabo Bryson singles chronology
"Turn the Hands of Time" (1981)	"Let the Feeling Flow" (1981)	"There's No Guarantee" (1982)

"Let the Feeling Flow" is a song by American recording artist Peabo Bryson. The song was released in 1981 as the lead single in support of his album, I Am Love. The song was a top ten R&B hit, peaking at number six on Billboard's Hot Black Singles, and forty-two on the Hot Pop Singles chart. American singer Whitney Houston later covered parts of the song to open the North American leg of her 1987-1988 Moment of Truth World Tour.

== Charts ==
Chart (1982)	Peak position
US Billboard Hot 100	42
US Hot R&B/Hip-Hop Songs	6
