= How Will I Know =

1985 single by Whitney Houston

Single by Whitney Houston

from the album Whitney Houston
- B-side: "Someone for Me"; "Saving All My Love for You"
- Released: November 22, 1985
- Recorded: 1984
- Studio: Mediasound (Manhattan)
- Genre: Synth-funk; dance-pop
- Length: 4:30
- Label: Arista
- Songwriters: George Merrill; Shannon Rubicam; Narada Michael Walden
- Producer: Narada Michael Walden

Whitney Houston singles chronology
"Thinking About You" (1985)	"How Will I Know" (1985)	"Greatest Love of All" (1986)

Music video
- "How Will I Know" on YouTube

"How Will I Know" is a song recorded by American singer Whitney Houston for her self-titled debut studio album. It was released on November 22, 1985, by Arista Records as the album's third single. Written and composed by George Merrill and Shannon Rubicam, it was originally intended for pop singer Janet Jackson, who passed on it. Houston then recorded the song with altered lyrics and production from Narada Michael Walden.

"How Will I Know" received mostly positive reviews from music critics. It became Houston's second number-one single on the US Billboard Hot 100 in February 1986, spending two weeks atop the chart, and also became her first chart-topper on the Canadian RPM 100 Singles chart. It also reached top-10 positions in Australia, Sweden, Ireland, Norway, and the United Kingdom, and top-20 positions in the Netherlands, New Zealand, and Switzerland.

The accompanying music video for "How Will I Know" features scenes of Houston dancing in a setting of video screens and colored partitions. The music video gave Houston exposure to teenagers via MTV and other video outlets. It received two nominations at the 1986 MTV Video Music Awards; Best Female Video and Best New Artist, winning the former category. The song was performed on many of her tours including Greatest Love Tour (1986) and her Nothing But Love World Tour (2009–10). "How Will I Know" is also featured as a remix on Houston's compilation album Whitney: The Greatest Hits (2000), whereas the original single version is featured on The Ultimate Collection (2007) and I Will Always Love You: The Best of Whitney Houston (2012). The song sold over 11 million units worldwide.

== Background and recording ==
Initially, husband-and-wife songwriters George Merrill and Shannon Rubicam had written the song's demo in 1984 for pop singer Janet Jackson, who was managed by A&M Records executive John McClain. However, after hearing the song, Jackson's management passed on it, feeling it was not a compatible fit with material already in development for her. In an interview with Fred Bronson, Merrill expressed his feelings after learning of Jackson's decision: "We were pretty upset because we thought it was perfect for her at the time. We had written it with her completely in mind." During this period, Brenda Andrews at Almo-Irving Music, Merrill and Rubicam's publisher, played the song for Gerry Griffith, the director for R&B music at A&M and Arista Records. Griffith, who was then compiling material for Houston's debut album, felt the song perfectly matched her musical style. He soon contacted Andrews and the song's two writers and suggested that they give the song to him for Houston's debut album. Griffith described his discovery of the song and what he and Clive Davis thought of it:

We had a lot of R&B-based tunes, we had a few ballads, but we didn't have a pop crossover song. So when I heard "How Will I Know," I said "this is absolutely perfect." I played it for Clive [and] he fell in love with it. I wasn't very familiar with her family background; I didn't realize that, even at that time, there was a pretty big industry buzz about her future.

After receiving permission from Merrill to use the song, Griffith quickly turned to Narada Michael Walden, who at the time was producing material for Aretha Franklin's album Who's Zoomin' Who?. Griffith implored him to produce it, describing how important the song would be for Houston's upcoming album. After hearing the demo, Walden agreed to fly to San Rafael, California, to arrange it. He was not very impressed with the demo and requested permission to change some of the lyrics and chord progression, inducing Merrill and Rubicam to deny him the right to their song. After a lot of back-and-forth with Griffith and Walden, they compromised and allowed Walden to de-construct the song and change the key and tempo. Walden engaged Premik Russell Tubbs to play the saxophone solo. After completing the song, Houston came in to the studio to record her vocal in late 1984. Her mother Cissy Houston joined her on background vocals. Walden stated:

I asked Whitney to sing on the background session. She was reluctant because she wanted to enjoy hearing her mother sing. I said, "No, get out there and sing," so she did. The background sounded incredible ... Clive Davis heard the mix and immediately gave it a 10, which is outrageous for him, because he doesn't like anything!

== Composition ==
"How Will I Know" (1985)
A sample of the song's chorus, where Houston sings "How will I know if he really loves me?". It also makes use of drums.

"How Will I Know" is a synth-funk and dance-pop song composed in a 1980s dance beat. According to Kyle Anderson of MTV, the song found Houston hitting an "incredible groove". It is written in the key of G flat major. The beat is set the time signature of common time and moves at a fast tempo of 120 beats per minute. The song also has the sequence of G♭-B♭m_{7}-G♭/C♭-D♭-E♭m-D♭ as its chord progression. Houston's vocals in the song span from the note of D♭_{4} to the high note of G_{5}. Lyrically, the song speaks about the lead woman trying to discern whether a man she likes will ever like her back. She is also hesitant, because her friends tell her "love can be deceiving", and she is so shy that she cannot call him. Later, she feels that it might be a dream, but realizes that "there's no mistaking", and that what she feels is really love.

== Critical reception ==
"How Will I Know" mainly garnered positive reviews from music critics, with some noting it as a standout on the album. Don Shewey of Rolling Stone commented "Although it's awfully reminiscent of the Pointer Sisters' 'He's So Shy', 'How Will I Know' is still irresistibly danceable." In its single releases section, Cashbox called the song a "hard funking pop effort which again spotlights Houston's explosive vocals and Narada Michael Walden's airtight production." Stephen Thomas Erlewine of AllMusic wrote "...what really impresses some 20-plus years on are the lighter tracks, particularly the breakthrough single 'How Will I Know'." While reviewing the Deluxe Anniversary Edition of the album, Mikael Wood of Entertainment Weekly commented on the a cappella version of the song, noting, "a cappella mix of 'How Will I Know' displays the singer's precision long before the advent of Auto-Tune."

While reviewing The Ultimate Collection, Nick Levine of Digital Spy commented, "Houston's floor-fillers have aged a little more gracefully, although their clunky, thudding drum sounds are as unmistakably Eighties as Joan Collins' Dynasty wardrobe." Dave Rimmer of Smash Hits considered that "this dreary bit of disco isn't anywhere near as good" as "Saving All My Love for You," adding that it "sounds positively snoozeworthy, in fact." The song was voted number 12 in VH1's list of "The Greatest Songs of the 1980s". Billboard voted the song number 229 on its list of the "500 Greatest Pop Songs of All Time", the first out of three Houston entries and the lowest ranked Houston song. On their list of Houston's 20 greatest songs, Forbes voted the song number 10.

== Commercial performance ==
"How Will I Know" debuted at number 60 on the US Billboard Hot 100 in the December 7, 1985, issue. It entered the top 40 at number 32 on the December 28, 1985 issue, starting a 16-week run in the top forty. Seven weeks later, it peaked at number one in the issue dated February 15, 1986, becoming Houston's second number-one single on that chart. It displaced Houston's cousin Dionne Warwick's "That's What Friends Are For", stayed at number one for two weeks, and was displaced by Mr. Mister's "Kyrie". It also debuted on the Billboard Hot Black Singles chart at number 60 on the December 28 issue, becoming the Hot Shot Debut of the week, Houston's first single to accomplish this, and peaked at number one on the March 8, 1986 issue for one week, displacing "Do Me, Baby" by Meli'sa Morgan at the top and becoming Houston's third number one single on the R&B charts. In the issue dated January 25, 1986, "How Will I Know" entered the Billboard Dance Club Songs chart at number 30, and later peaked at number three in the February 22, 1986, issue. It also reached number one on the Billboard Adult Contemporary chart for a week on the February 15, 1986 issue, displacing "The Sweetest Taboo" by Sade. The Recording Industry Association of America (RIAA) certified the single Gold on December 6, 1995, for shipments of 500,000 copies or more, and later triple platinum, for equivalent sales of 3 million units. It ranked at number six on the Billboard year-end chart.

In Canada, the single debuted at number 80 on the RPM Top 100 Singles chart in the issue dated December 14, 1985. It later peaked at number one in the week dated March 1, 1986, becoming Houston's first number-one single in Canada. It was later certified Gold by the Canadian Recording Industry Association (CRIA) on May 1, 1986, for shipments of 200,000 copies or more.

The single also performed well in other countries. In the United Kingdom it debuted at number 36 during the week of January 25, 1986, and later peaked at number five. It was certified Silver by the British Phonographic Industry (BPI) for pure sales of 250,000 copies; its digital single has been certified 2x platinum for sales of 1.2 million copies. According to MTV UK and Ireland, the single has sold about 280,000 copies in the UK. In New Zealand it debuted at number 35, and peaked at number 19. In Austria it reached a peak position of number 28, while peaking at number 12 in the Netherlands. It also reached number two in Norway and Sweden, while charting at number 11 in Switzerland. According to AllMusic, "How Will I Know" has sold about 1.5 million copies worldwide.

In Australia "How Will I Know" was released as the first single from the album in March 1985. It spent a single week on the Kent Music Report chart at number 97 in July 1985, before re-entering the chart in February 1986, eventually peaking at number two.

== Music video ==
The accompanying music video for "How Will I Know", directed by British director Brian Grant and choreographed by Arlene Phillips, was filmed in London, England. Unlike her past music videos, Houston was given the opportunity to move beyond the staged performance settings to demonstrate straightforward dance moves. The video is set against a strikingly designed, vividly colored setting of video screens and partitions. Houston's hair is dyed honey blonde and is worn by a dazzling, colored hairbow. She is also seen underlined by a form-fitting silver dress made of metal mesh, reaching almost to her knees, adorned with matching fingerless gloves. Houston is also seen performing with backup dancers in black outfits and wearing French-style makeup. The video also has a scene of spattering of paint and drizzling down the screen. Houston's labelmate and family friend Aretha Franklin also makes a black-and-white cameo appearance in the otherwise colorful music video. In 2011, Kyle Anderson of MTV wrote that it was "eye-opening to watch her cut loose in a fun environment," since her past songs were ballads.

The music video was her first to receive heavy rotation on MTV. It first entered MTV's playlist prior to Christmas 1985 and was one of Houston's videos to help her break the color barrier for black women sustaining heavy rotation on the channel, later paving the way for Janet Jackson's success on the channel. It was also nominated for two awards at the 1986 MTV Video Music Awards, in the categories of Best New Artist and Best Female Video, winning the latter.

== Live performances ==
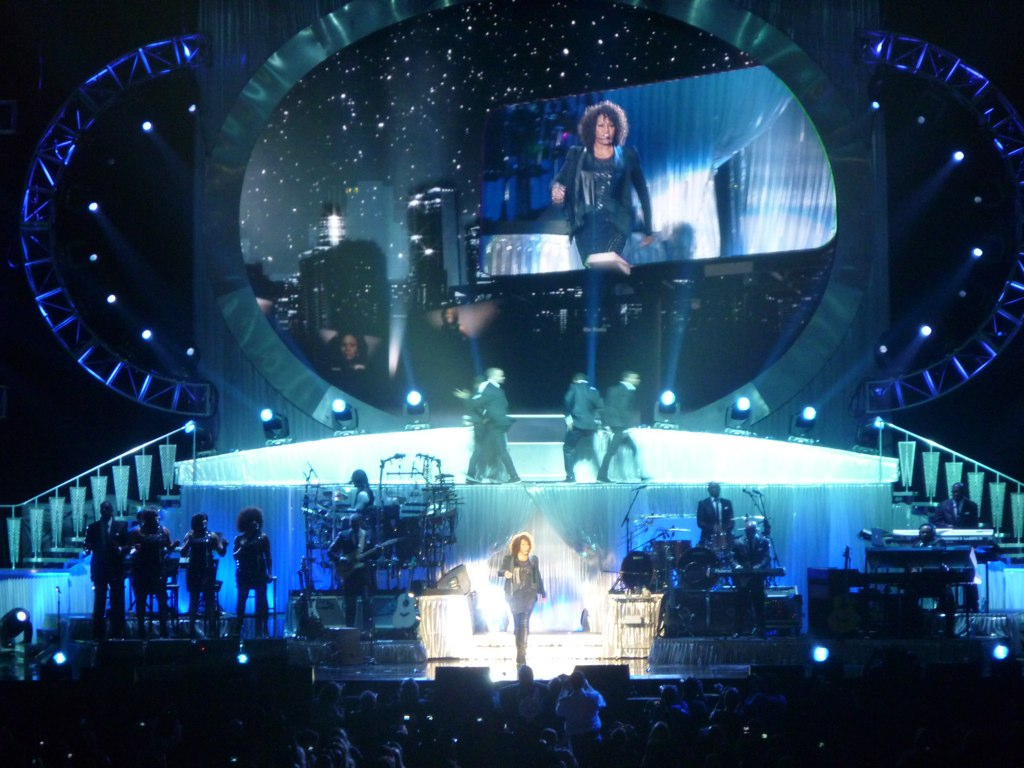
Houston performing on her Nothing But Love World Tour during a Milan show

Houston performed the song on her Greatest Love Tour (1986), Moment of Truth World Tour (1987–88), Feels So Right Japan Tour (1990), I'm Your Baby Tonight World Tour (1991), The Bodyguard World Tour (1993–1994), My Love Is Your Love World Tour (1999) and Nothing But Love World Tour (2009–2010). Apart from the concert tour performances, Houston has performed the song on many other occasions such as the third annual MTV Video Music Awards in 1986, where she sang "How Will I Know" and "Greatest Love of All", 13th Annual American Music Awards (1986), and 1987 BRIT Awards. The latter performance is included in the 2014 CD/DVD release, Whitney Houston Live: Her Greatest Performances. On May 15, 1987, during her European promotion for then-new album, Whitney, Houston sang the song at the Montreux Golden Rose Rock Festival: IM&MC Gala with two other 1986 released songs, "I Wanna Dance with Somebody (Who Loves Me)" and "Where Do Broken Hearts Go".

Houston performed the song during the April 20, 1985 episode of Soul Train. On April 29, 1985, Houston appeared on The Merv Griffin Show, taped in New York City, and performed "How Will I Know". On her Moment of Truth World Tour, she participated in the Nelson Mandela 70th Birthday Tribute Concert and performed the song with other seven songs. She also performed the song on Welcome Home Heroes, a concert dedicated to the U.S. troops, their families, and military and government dignitaries in honor of those returning from the Gulf War, which aired on HBO on March 31, 1991. The concert was taped and later released as a VHS on May 14, 1991. She also performed the song on The Concert for a New South Africa, three concerts in 1994 to honor President Nelson Mandela. Houston later performed the song on the closing ceremonies of the 1994 World Cup along with five of her other songs. In 2000, she performed the song on Arista's 25th Anniversary, along with "I Wanna Dance with Somebody (Who Loves Me)."

== Legacy ==
=== Impact ===
"How Will I Know" has been described as "one of the most recognizable pop anthems of all time" and a "definitive pillar of 80s pop". When the song topped the Billboard Hot 100, Houston became the first female artist to have consecutive number one singles during the 1980s and was the first female artist since Donna Summer to have back-to-back number one singles. She was also the first artist in almost a decade to replace a famous relative atop the Billboard Hot 100 as "How Will I Know" replaced cousin Dionne Warwick's "That's What Friends Are For" at number one in February 1986. This was the first time this had occurred since the Bee Gees' "Night Fever" replaced younger brother Andy Gibb's "(Love Is) Thicker Than Water" at number one on the chart; Houston and Warwick were the first cousins to replace each other at number one on the chart. "How Will I Know" was also the second of what would be a historic record of seven consecutive number one singles on the Billboard Hot 100, a record that has yet to be broken.

=== Polls and rankings ===
In its issue of the "40 Years of Rock 'n Roll" in 1992, Life included the song in their top five songs list for the best of the year 1986 along with "Addicted to Love" by Robert Palmer, "Kiss" by Prince and the Revolution, and "Higher Love" by Steve Winwood. "How Will I Know" was included in Bruce Pollock's 2005 and 2014 editions of the book, The 7,500 Most Important Songs of the Rock and Roll Era 1944-2000 alongside four other Houston classics "Exhale (Shoop Shoop)", "I Wanna Dance with Somebody (Who Loves Me)", "I'm Your Baby Tonight" and "You Give Good Love". The song was ranked the 12th greatest song of the 1980s by VH1 the following year in 2006. In 2013, the song was included in the book, 1,001 Songs You Must Hear Before You Die. In 2018, noting its influence in the gay community, the song was ranked the 11th greatest LGBTQ anthem of all time, writing "the late singer has a long and storied connection to the gay community, but she first called to her LGBTQ fans with this 1985 track. Although much of her discography was framed by popular culture as heterosexual, a closer reading reveals that her lyrics are largely ungendered — she wants to dance with somebody (anybody) who loves her." In their list of 200 greatest 1980s songs, Pitchfork placed the song at number 103. It was one of two Houston songs on the list. Rod Couch ranked the song the 188th greatest song of the rock era, the fourth-ranked song out of six Houston songs on Couch's book, The Top 500 Songs of the Rock Era 1955-2015. In 2023, it was ranked the sixth greatest song of the 1980s by Rolling Stone magazine.

In February 2012, following her death, MTV named it one of her ten best songs, writing that the song proved "Houston was more than just a big-ballad diva". That same month, readers of Rolling Stone ranked it among Houston's greatest songs. Rob Sheffield raved about the song in his list of his favorite Houston songs, writing how the song was her "real breakthrough hit, the hit that everybody liked", calling it a "bubbly Eighties synth-pop confection, loosening up with teen-angst lyrics worthy of the Smiths (very similar to “This Charming Man,” actually) and state-of-the-art glitz-funk." Bill Lamb of About.com ranked it as the 3rd best Houston song. On November 6, 2020, a day before Houston was formally inducted into the Rock and Roll Hall of Fame, Billboard magazine ranked it Houston's fifth best song. In their list of twenty greatest Houston songs, The Guardian ranked it sixth place, comparing it to "Let's Hear It for the Boy" by Deniece Williams calling it a better song than Williams' song, adding that it was "a perfectly formed slice of mid-80s bubblegum soul – booming drums, sax solo and all – as bright and appealing as the neon colours splashed around the set of its video." On what would be her 59th birthday in August 2022, the song was ranked her sixth best song out of 40 of her hits by BET, with the network citing it as "Whitney at her most irresistibly danceable and innocently joyful." In December 2022, USA Today ranked it her best song, writing "Though stocked with ’80s touchstones – a gurgling sax solo, a squiggly guitar break – the song is deeper than its Lite-Brite video conveys as Houston allows us to feel her shyness and uncertainty". The A.V. Club ranked it Houston's most powerful and essential song out of 15 excluding the inclusion of "I Will Always Love You". In 2024, Forbes ranked it the tenth greatest Houston song of all time, writing that it "was considered one of the greatest songs to come out of the '80s" and cited it as one of Houston's signature songs.

== Formats and track listings ==
- US 7" vinyl single

A: "How Will I Know" (edit) – 4:10
B: "Someone for Me" – 4:57

- German 12" vinyl single

A: "How Will I Know" (dance remix) – 6:35
B1: "How Will I Know" (instrumental version) – 4:42
B2: "How Will I Know" (LP version) – 4:28

- German 12" vinyl single

A: "How Will I Know" (dance mix) – 6:10
B1: "Saving All My Love for You" – 3:55
B2: "How Will I Know" (dub mix) – 5:36

- Japan CD single/3"
1. "How Will I Know" – 4:34
2. "Someone for Me" – 5:00

== Credits and personnel ==
"How Will I Know"

- George Merrill – writer
- Shannon Rubicam – writer
- Narada Michael Walden – writer, vocal producer
- Whitney Houston – lead vocals, vocal arrangement
- Mary Canty – background vocals
- Preston Glass – synthesizer
- Cissy Houston – background vocals
- Randy Jackson – bass
- Yvonne Lewis – keyboards
- Corrado Rustici – guitar
- Premik Russell Tubbs – saxophone
- Bill Schnee – mixer, Firewire synth trumpet, drums
- Michael Barbiero – engineer

"Someone for Me"

- Freddie Washington – writer
- Raymond Jones – writer
- Jermaine Jackson – producer
- Whitney Houston – lead vocals, vocal arrangement
- John Barnes – keyboards
- Nathan East – bass
- Ed Greene – drums
- Paul Jackson, Jr. – guitar
- Tim May – guitar
- Greg Phillinganes – synthesizer
- John "J.R." Robinson – drums
- Steve Rucker – drums
- Freddie Washington – bass
- Bill Schnee – mixer

== Charts ==
=== Weekly charts ===
Chart (1985–1991)	Peak position
Australia (Kent Music Report)	2
Austria (Ö3 Austria Top 40)	28
Belgium (Ultratop 50 Flanders)	28
Canada Top Singles (RPM)	1
Canada Retail Singles (The Record)	1
Denmark (IFPI)	12
European Hot 100 Singles (Music & Media)	13
Finland (Suomen virallinen lista)	5
Germany (GfK)	26
Iceland (RÚV)	1
Ireland (IRMA)	3
Luxembourg (Radio Luxembourg)	4
Netherlands (Dutch Top 40)	15
Netherlands (Single Top 100)	12
New Zealand (Recorded Music NZ)	19
Norway (VG-lista)	2
Quebec (ADISQ)	2
Sweden (Sverigetopplistan)	2
Switzerland (Schweizer Hitparade)	11
UK Singles (Official Charts)	5
US Billboard Hot 100	1
US Hot R&B/Hip-Hop Songs (Billboard)	1
US Adult Contemporary (Billboard)	1
US Dance Club Songs (Billboard) Remix	3
US Cash Box Top 100	1
US Top Black Contemporary Singles (Cash Box)	1
US Top 12" Singles (Cash Box)	1

Chart (2012–2016)	Peak position
Australia (ARIA)	67
Canada Digital Song Sales (Billboard)	68
France (SNEP)	111
Netherlands (Dutch Top 40)	100
Poland Airplay (ZPAV)	58
UK Singles (Official Charts)	56
US Billboard Hot 100	49
US Digital Song Sales (Billboard)	36
US R&B/Hip-Hop Digital Songs (Billboard)	12

=== Year-end charts ===
Chart (1986)	Position
Australia (Kent Music Report)	22
Canada Top Singles (RPM)	17
Finland (Suomen virallinen lista)	40
UK Singles (OCC)	59
US Top Pop Singles (Billboard)	6
US Top Adult Contemporary Singles (Billboard)	19
US Top Black Singles (Billboard)	29
US Top Dance Club Play Singles (Billboard)	46
US Top 50 Singles (Cash Box)	24
US Top 50 Black Contemporary Singles (Cash Box)	22
US Top 12" Singles (Cash Box)	18

== Certifications ==
Region	Certification	Certified units/sales
Canada (Music Canada)	Platinum	80,000^{‡}
Denmark (IFPI Danmark)	Platinum	90,000^{‡}
Germany (BVMI)	Gold	300,000^{‡}
New Zealand (RMNZ)	2× Platinum	60,000^{‡}
United Kingdom (BPI) Digital single	2× Platinum	1,200,000^{‡}
United Kingdom (BPI) Physical single	Silver	250,000^{^}
United States (RIAA)	3× Platinum	3,000,000^{‡}
^{^} Shipments figures based on certification alone.^{‡} Sales+streaming figures based on certification alone.

== Notable cover versions and samples ==
=== Sam Smith version ===
British singer Sam Smith released a cover of "How Will I Know" in June 2014, taking a slower tempo and a snippet of that version was used in an episode of Grey's Anatomy. It was later included on Smith's 2015 In the Lonely Hour (Drowning Shadows Edition), a re-release of their debut album.

=== Certifications ===
Certifications for "How Will I Know"
Region	Certification	Certified units/sales
Australia (ARIA)	Gold	35,000^{‡}
Canada (Music Canada)	Gold	40,000^{‡}
Denmark (IFPI Danmark)	Gold	45,000^{‡}
New Zealand (RMNZ)	Gold	15,000^{‡}
United Kingdom (BPI)	Silver	200,000^{‡}
United States (RIAA)	Gold	500,000^{‡}
^{‡} Sales+streaming figures based on certification alone.

=== David Guetta, MistaJam and John Newman version ===
"If You Really Love Me (How Will I Know)"

Single by David Guetta, MistaJam and John Newman
- Released: July 2, 2021
- Length: 3:04
- Label: Parlophone
- Songwriters: George Merrill; Shannon Rubicam; Narada Michael Walden; David Guetta; Franklin; John Newman; Peter Dalton; Ollie Green
- Producers: David Guetta; MistaJam; John Newman; Timofey Reznikov; Ollie Green

David Guetta singles chronology
"Remember" (2021)	"If You Really Love Me (How Will I Know)" (2021)	"Get Together" (2021)

MistaJam singles chronology
"Make You Better" (2021)	"If You Really Love Me (How Will I Know)" (2021)	"The Recipe" (2021)

John Newman singles chronology
"High on You" (2020)	"If You Really Love Me (How Will I Know)" (2021)	"Waiting For a Lifetime" (2022)

Music video
- "(If You Really Love Me) How Will I Know" on YouTube

In 2021, French DJ and producer David Guetta teamed up with British DJ and producer MistaJam and singer John Newman to release a dance track based on an interpolation of "How Will I Know". Now called "If You Really Love Me (How Will I Know)", the song charted in the UK, reaching No. 66 in the Top 75 (for the week ending August 5, 2021) after amassing a sales total of 7,018 units. The song became the fourth entry on that week's chart for Guetta (though the only single out of the four chart hits where he took lead artist credit) and the first chart credit for Newman since "Give Me Your Love" with British DJ and record producer Sigala and American guitarist Nile Rodgers in 2016.

=== Charts ===
==== Weekly charts ====
Chart (2021–2022)	Peak position
Czech Republic Airplay (ČNS IFPI)	20
Global Excl. US (Billboard)	154
Hungary (Dance Top 40)	13
Hungary (Single Top 40)	26
Ireland (IRMA)	30
Slovakia Airplay (ČNS IFPI)	33
UK Singles (Official Charts)	27
UK Dance (Official Charts)	8
US Hot Dance/Electronic Songs (Billboard)	19

==== Year-end charts ====
Chart (2021)	Position
Hungary (Dance Top 40)	89
US Hot Dance/Electronic Songs (Billboard)	86

=== Certifications ===
Region	Certification	Certified units/sales
Austria (IFPI Austria)	Gold	15,000^{‡}
United Kingdom (BPI)	Gold	400,000^{‡}
^{‡} Sales+streaming figures based on certification alone.

=== Whitney × Clean Bandit version ===
"How Will I Know (Whitney × Clean Bandit)"

Single by Whitney Houston and Clean Bandit
- Released: September 24, 2021
- Length: 3:33
- Songwriters: George Merrill; Shannon Rubicam; Narada Michael Walden
- Producers: Jack Patterson; Mark Ralph

Whitney Houston singles chronology
"Higher Love" (2019)	"How Will I Know (Whitney × Clean Bandit)" (2021)	"He Can Use Me" (2023)

Clean Bandit singles chronology
"Drive" (2021)	"How Will I Know (Whitney × Clean Bandit)" (2021)	"Everything but You" (2022)

Music video
- "How Will I Know (Whitney Houston × Clean Bandit)" on YouTube

In September 2021, British electronic music group Clean Bandit released a remix of the track, which samples Houston's vocal from the original version. The song has become an international success. It reached number 92 on the UK singles chart, making Houston one of the few artists to have a charted single in five or more decades. The remix has been certified in three countries, including the United Kingdom, where Houston became the first female artist to have certified singles in five consecutive decades (1980s–2020s).

=== Charts ===
==== Weekly charts ====
Weekly chart performance for "How Will I Know"
Chart (2021–2022)	Peak position
Canada AC (Billboard)	12
Canada Hot AC (Billboard)	48
Japan Hot Overseas (Billboard)	20
Netherlands (Dutch Top 40 Tipparade)	26
South Africa Radio (RISA)	55
UK Singles (Official Charts)	92
US Hot Dance/Electronic Songs (Billboard)	23

=== Certifications ===
Region	Certification	Certified units/sales
Canada (Music Canada)	Gold	40,000^{‡}
New Zealand (RMNZ)	Gold	15,000^{‡}
United Kingdom (BPI)	Silver	200,000^{‡}
^{‡} Sales+streaming figures based on certification alone.

=== Other covers and samples ===
In January 2004, British dance group LMC released the song "Take Me to the Clouds Above", which interpolates the first four lines of "How Will I Know" over a sample of "With or Without You" by Irish rock band U2. The song is credited to "LMC vs U2". In 2015, Dutch EDM duo W&W released the song "The One", sampling some elements of the song. In 1996, the Lemonheads included a cover of the song in both electric and acoustic versions on the single "If I Could Talk I'd Tell You". American pop punk band Hit the Lights covered the song in 2008. The song has been covered 73 times since its release, according to WhoSampled.

== See also ==
- List of RPM number-one singles of 1986
- List of Hot 100 number-one singles of 1986 (U.S.)
- List of number-one R&B singles of 1986 (U.S.)
- List of number-one adult contemporary singles of 1986 (U.S.)

== Bibliography ==
- Dimery, Robert (2013), 1,001 Songs You Must Hear Before You Die, Quintessence, ISBN 978-0-7893-2089-6
- Parish, James Robert (2003), Whitney Houston: The Unauthorized Biography, Aurum Press, ISBN 978-1-85410-921-7
- Bowman, Jeffery (1995), Diva: The Totally Unauthorized Biography of Whitney Houston, Harper Collins Publishers, ISBN 0-06-100853-2
- Bronson, Fred (2003), The Billboard Book of Number 1 Hits, Billboard Books, ISBN 0-8230-7677-6
