= Willard Meeks =

Willard Meeks Jr. is an American pianist, organist, songwriter, and music producer. Some of his credits include Kanye West's album Late Registration, song Crack Music from Roc-A-Fella Records, The New York Community Choir (RCA records), Glenn Jones (Jive Records), and Martha Wash. He is also known for being Whitney Houston's touring keyboard player during the Greatest Love World Tour. Willard Meeks Jr. is credited as writer for the hit "Express Yourself" along with Arthur Freeman, B. Diggs. Willard Meeks is a graduate of Manhattan School of Music where he earned a Bachelor's degree in music.
