= Billboard Year-End Hot 100 singles of 1996 =

Ranking of recorded music

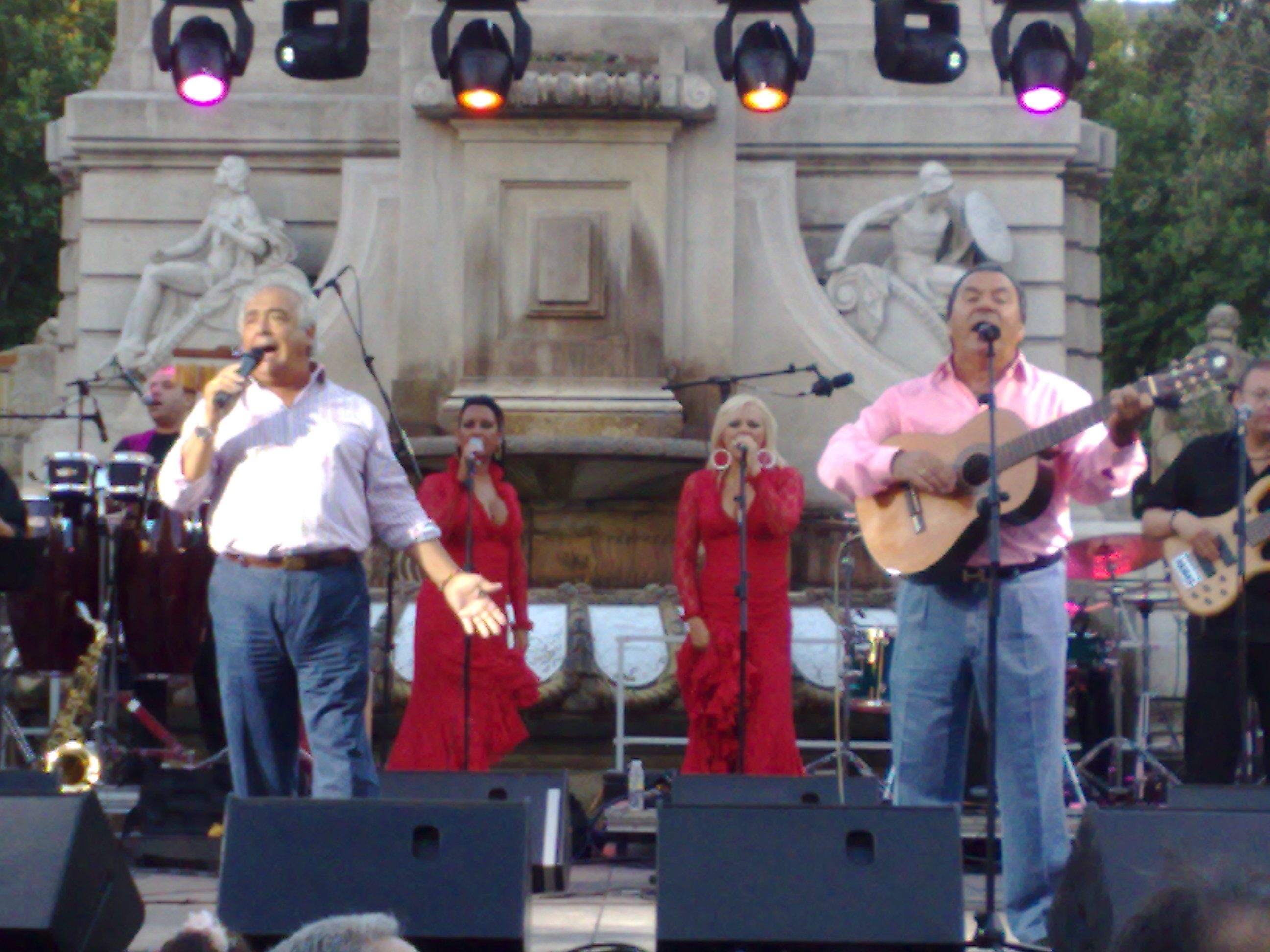
Two versions of "Macarena" by Los del Río (pictured) were included on the Year-End chart; its Bayside Boys Mix topped the chart after peaking at number one on the Hot 100 for 14 weeks.

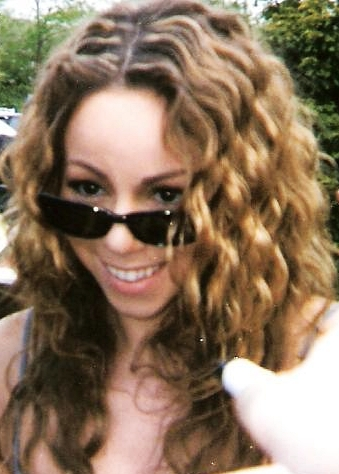
Mariah Carey (pictured) had three songs on the Year-End chart from her album Daydream: the Hot 100 number ones "One Sweet Day" with Boyz II Men and "Always Be My Baby" at numbers two and five, respectively, and "Fantasy" at number 49.

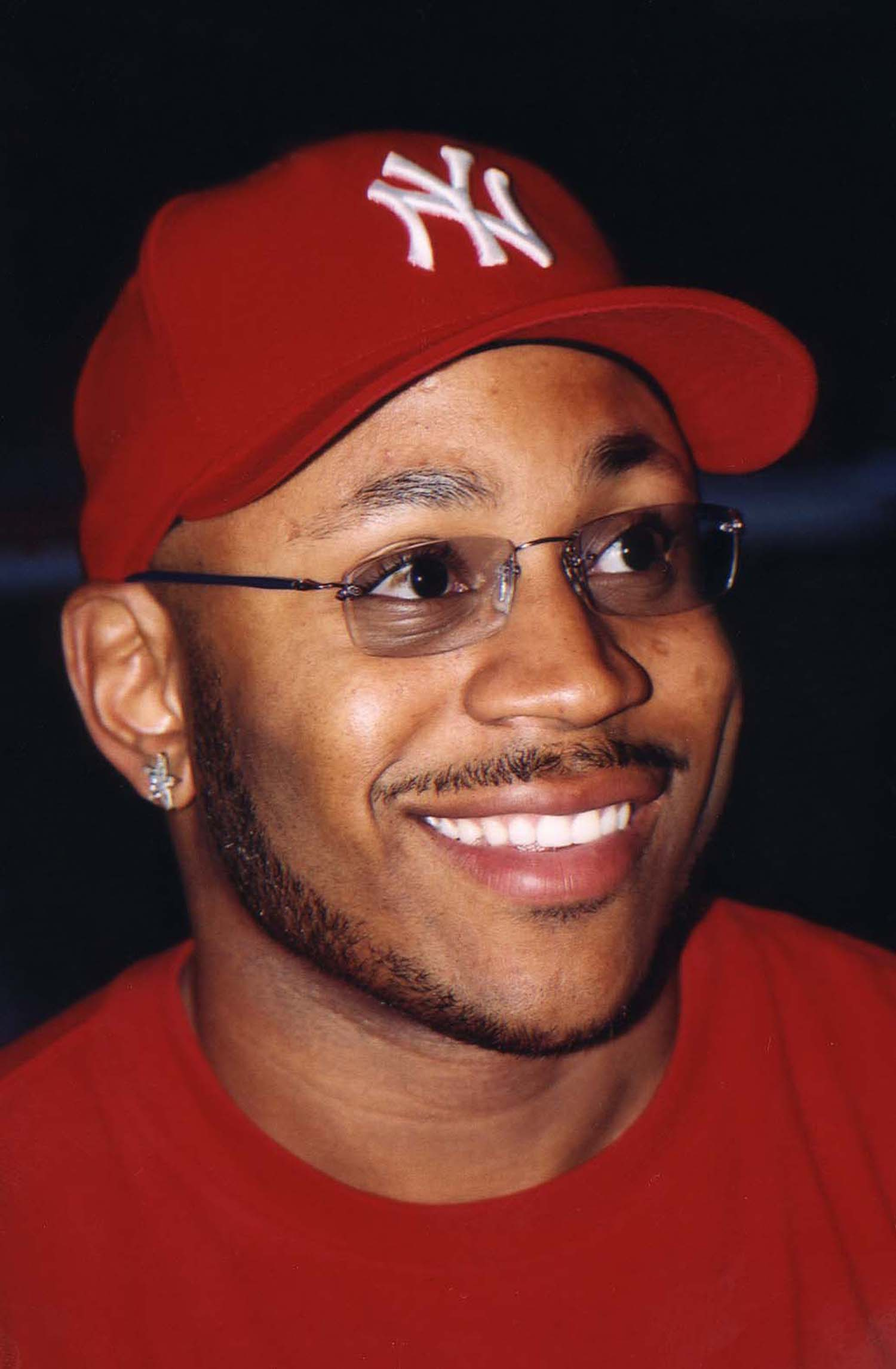
All three singles from the 1995 album Mr. Smith by LL Cool J (pictured) were featured on the Year-End chart, with two—"Hey Lover" and "Loungin"—appearing in the top-40.

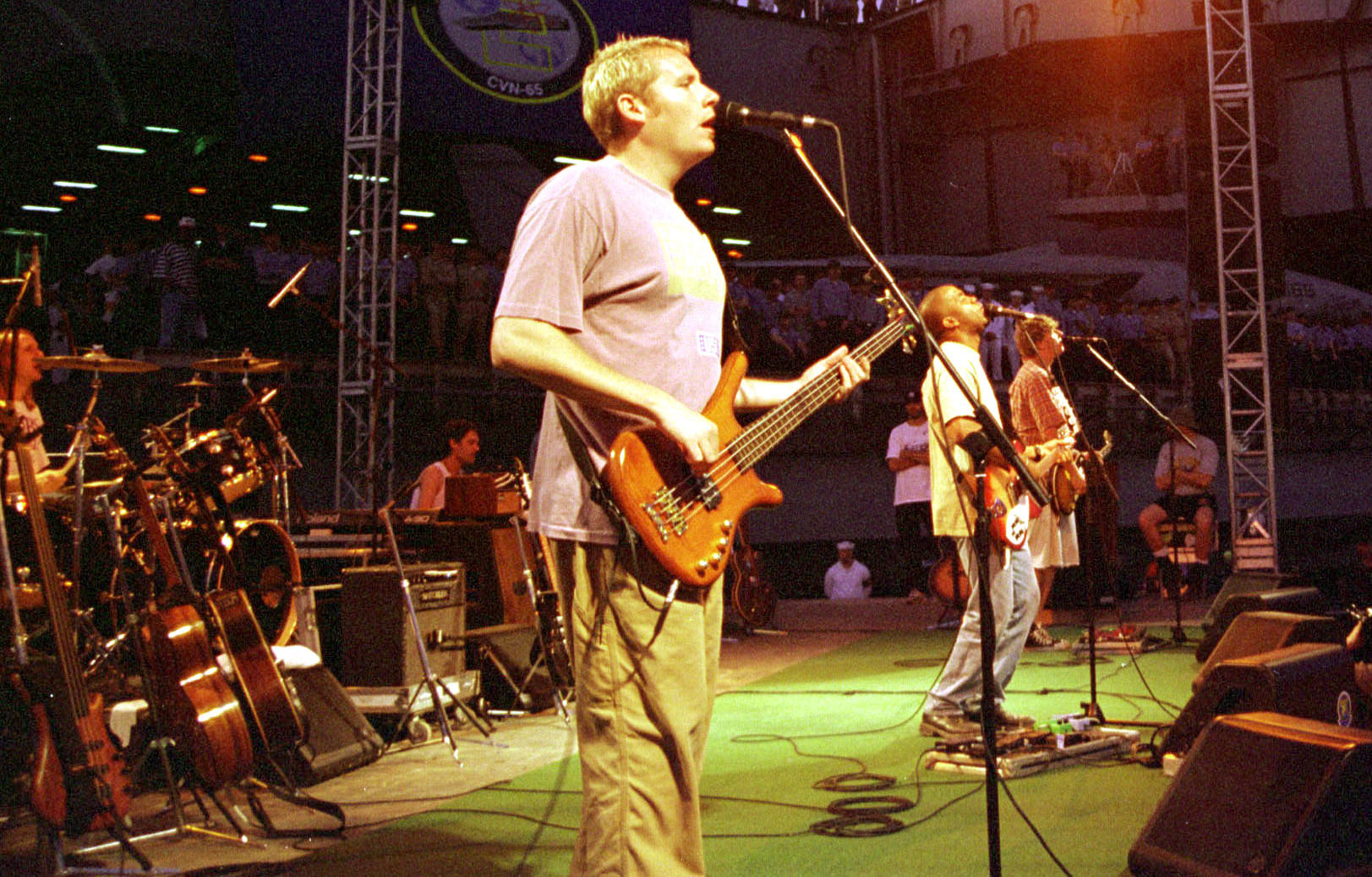
Hootie & the Blowfish (pictured) charted with three songs: "Time" at number 50, "Old Man & Me (When I Get to Heaven)" at number 74, and "Only Wanna Be with You" at number 99.

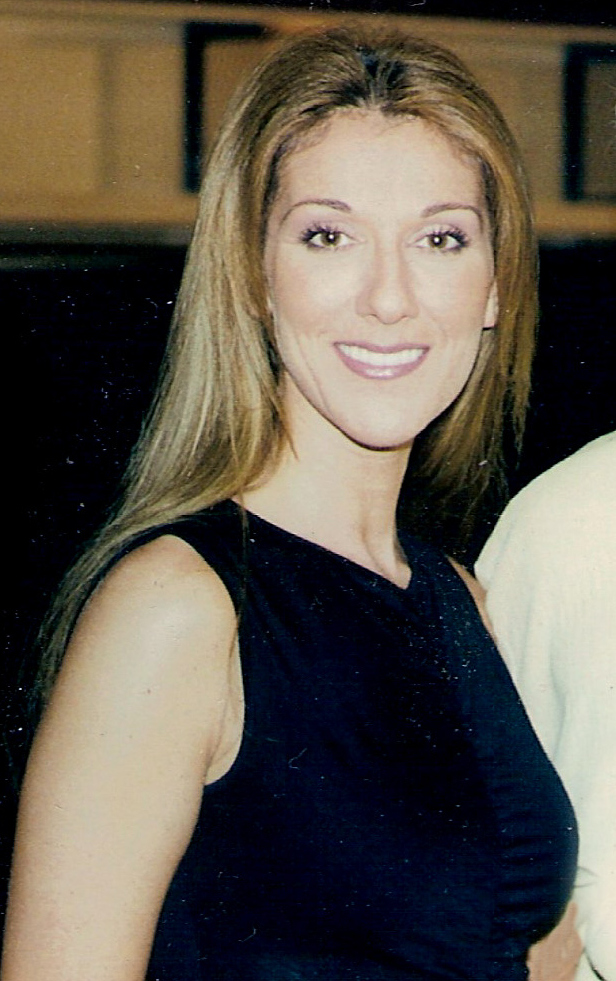
Celine Dion's (pictured) Hot 100 number one single "Because You Loved Me" charted at number three on the Year-End chart, while her song "It's All Coming Back to Me Now" peaked at number 18.

This is a list of Billboard magazine's Top Hot 100 songs of 1996.

№	Title	Artist(s)
1	"Macarena (Bayside Boys Mix)"	Los del Río
2	"One Sweet Day"	Mariah Carey and Boyz II Men
3	"Because You Loved Me"	Celine Dion
4	"Nobody Knows"	The Tony Rich Project
5	"Always Be My Baby"	Mariah Carey
6	"Give Me One Reason"	Tracy Chapman
7	"Tha Crossroads"	Bone Thugs-n-Harmony
8	"I Love You Always Forever"	Donna Lewis
9	"You're Makin' Me High" / "Let It Flow"	Toni Braxton
10	"Twisted"	Keith Sweat
11	"C'mon N' Ride It (The Train)"	Quad City DJ's
12	"Missing"	Everything but the Girl
13	"Ironic"	Alanis Morissette
14	"Exhale (Shoop Shoop)"	Whitney Houston
15	"Follow You Down" / "Til I Hear It from You"	Gin Blossoms
16	"Sittin' Up in My Room"	Brandy
17	"How Do U Want It" / "California Love"	2Pac featuring K-Ci and JoJo / 2Pac featuring Dr. Dre and Roger Troutman
18	"It's All Coming Back to Me Now"	Celine Dion
19	"Change the World"	Eric Clapton
20	"Hey Lover"	LL Cool J featuring Boyz II Men
21	"Loungin"	LL Cool J
22	"Insensitive"	Jann Arden
23	"Be My Lover"	La Bouche
24	"Name"	Goo Goo Dolls
25	"Who Will Save Your Soul"	Jewel
26	"Where Do You Go"	No Mercy
27	"I Can't Sleep Baby (If I)"	R. Kelly
28	"Counting Blue Cars"	Dishwalla
29	"You Learn" / "You Oughta Know"	Alanis Morissette
30	"One of Us"	Joan Osborne
31	"Wonder"	Natalie Merchant
32	"Not Gon' Cry"	Mary J. Blige
33	"Gangsta's Paradise"	Coolio featuring L.V.
34	"Only You"	112 featuring The Notorious B.I.G.
35	"Down Low (Nobody Has to Know)"	R. Kelly featuring Ronald Isley
36	"You're the One"	SWV
37	"Sweet Dreams"	La Bouche
38	"Before You Walk Out of My Life" / "Like This and Like That"	Monica
39	"Breakfast at Tiffany's"	Deep Blue Something
40	"1, 2, 3, 4 (Sumpin' New)"	Coolio
41	"The World I Know"	Collective Soul
42	"No Diggity"	Blackstreet featuring Dr. Dre
43	"Anything"	3T
44	"1979"	The Smashing Pumpkins
45	"Diggin' on You"	TLC
46	"Why I Love You So Much" / "Ain't Nobody"	Monica
47	"Kissin' You"	Total
48	"Count on Me"	Whitney Houston and CeCe Winans
49	"Fantasy"	Mariah Carey
50	"Time"	Hootie & the Blowfish
51	"You'll See"	Madonna
52	"Last Night"	Az Yet
53	"Mouth"	Merril Bainbridge
54	"The Earth, the Sun, the Rain"	Color Me Badd
55	"All the Things (Your Man Won't Do)"	Joe
56	"Wonderwall"	Oasis
57	"Woo Hah!! Got You All in Check" / "Everything Remains Raw"	Busta Rhymes
58	"Tell Me"	Groove Theory
59	"Elevators (Me & You)"	Outkast
60	"Hook"	Blues Traveler
61	"Doin' It"	LL Cool J
62	"Fastlove"	George Michael
63	"Touch Me, Tease Me"	Case featuring Foxy Brown
64	"Tonite's tha Night"	Kris Kross
65	"Children"	Robert Miles
66	"Theme from Mission: Impossible"	Adam Clayton and Larry Mullen
67	"Closer to Free"	BoDeans
68	"Just a Girl"	No Doubt
69	"If Your Girl Only Knew"	Aaliyah
70	"Lady"	D'Angelo
71	"Key West Intermezzo (I Saw You First)"	John Mellencamp
72	"Pony"	Ginuwine
73	"Nobody"	Keith Sweat featuring Athena Cage
74	"Old Man & Me (When I Get to Heaven)"	Hootie & the Blowfish
75	"If It Makes You Happy"	Sheryl Crow
76	"As I Lay Me Down"	Sophie B. Hawkins
77	"Keep On, Keepin' On"	MC Lyte featuring Xscape
78	"Jealousy"	Natalie Merchant
79	"I Want to Come Over"	Melissa Etheridge
80	"Who Do U Love"	Deborah Cox
81	"Un-Break My Heart"	Toni Braxton
82	"This Is Your Night"	Amber
83	"You Remind Me of Something"	R. Kelly
84	"Runaway"	Janet Jackson
85	"Set U Free"	Planet Soul
86	"Hit Me Off"	New Edition
87	"No One Else"	Total
88	"My Boo"	Ghost Town DJ's
89	"Get Money"	Junior M.A.F.I.A. featuring The Notorious B.I.G.
90	"That Girl"	Maxi Priest featuring Shaggy
91	"Po Pimp"	Do or Die featuring Twista
92	"Until It Sleeps"	Metallica
93	"Hay"	Crucial Conflict
94	"Beautiful Life"	Ace of Base
95	"Back for Good"	Take That
96	"I Got Id" / "Long Road"	Pearl Jam
97	"Soon as I Get Home"	Faith Evans
98	"Macarena"	Los del Río
99	"Only Wanna Be with You"	Hootie & the Blowfish
100	"Don't Cry"	Seal

== See also ==
- 1996 in music
- Billboard Year-End Hot R&B Singles of 1996
- Billboard Year-End Hot Rap Singles of 1996
- List of Billboard Hot 100 number-one singles of 1996
- List of Billboard Hot 100 top-ten singles in 1996
