= Billboard Year-End Hot R&B Singles of 1996 =

American music chart

This is a list of Billboard magazine's Top Hot R&B Singles of 1996.

No.	Title	Artist(s)
1	"You're Makin' Me High" / "Let It Flow"	Toni Braxton
2	"All the Things (Your Man Won't Do)"	Joe
3	"Tha Crossroads"	Bone Thugs-n-Harmony
4	"Down Low (Nobody Has to Know)"	R. Kelly featuring Ronald Isley
5	"Twisted"	Keith Sweat
6	"How Do U Want It" / "California Love"	2Pac featuring K-Ci & JoJo
7	"Only You"	112 featuring The Notorious B.I.G. and Mase
8	"Sittin' Up in My Room"	Brandy
9	"Before You Walk Out of My Life" / "Like This and Like That"	Monica
10	"Touch Me, Tease Me"	Case featuring Foxy Brown and Mary J. Blige
11	"Why I Love You So Much" / "Ain't Nobody"	Monica
12	"Kissin' You"	Total
13	"Not Gon' Cry"	Mary J. Blige
14	"Lady"	D'Angelo
15	"One Sweet Day"	Mariah Carey and Boyz II Men
16	"I Can't Sleep Baby (If I)"	R. Kelly
17	"You're the One"	SWV
18	"Exhale (Shoop Shoop)"	Whitney Houston
19	"Always Be My Baby"	Mariah Carey
20	"Loungin"	LL Cool J
21	"Soon as I Get Home"	Faith Evans
22	"No One Else"	Total featuring Da Brat
23	"Get On Up"	Jodeci
24	"I Will Survive"	Chantay Savage
25	"Last Night"	Az Yet
26	"Get Money"	Junior M.A.F.I.A. featuring The Notorious B.I.G.
27	"Keep On Keepin' On"	MC Lyte featuring Xscape
28	"Hey Lover"	LL Cool J featuring Boyz II Men
29	"No Diggity"	Blackstreet featuring Dr. Dre and Queen Pen
30	"Nobody Knows"	The Tony Rich Project
31	"What Kind of Man Would I Be"	Mint Condition
32	"Pony"	Ginuwine
33	"Tell Me"	Dru Hill
34	"A Thin Line Between Love and Hate"	H-Town
35	"Count On Me"	Whitney Houston and CeCe Winans
36	"If Your Girl Only Knew"	Aaliyah
37	"Tonite's tha Night"	Kris Kross
38	"You"	Monifah
39	"Elevators (Me & You)"	Outkast
40	"Woo-Hah!! Got You All in Check"	Busta Rhymes
41	"C'mon N' Ride It (The Train)"	Quad City DJ's
42	"Nobody"	Keith Sweat
43	"Use Your Heart"	SWV
44	"Ascension (Don't Ever Wonder)"	Maxwell
45	"The Things That You Do"	Gina Thompson featuring Missy Elliott
46	"Love U 4 Life"	Jodeci
47	"5 O'Clock"	Nonchalant
48	"Doin' It"	LL Cool J
49	"Hit Me Off"	New Edition
50	"Where Do U Want Me to Put It"	Solo
51	"Po Pimp"	Do or Die featuring Twista
52	"Missing You"	Brandy, Tamia, Gladys Knight and Chaka Khan
53	"Who Can I Run To"	Xscape
54	"I Miss You (Come Back Home)"	Monifah
55	"Hay"	Crucial Conflict
56	"Who Do U Love"	Deborah Cox
57	"You Remind Me of Something"	R. Kelly
58	"Do You Want To" / "Can't Hang"	Xscape
59	"House Keeper"	Men of Vizion
60	"My Boo"	Ghost Town DJ's
61	"We Got It"	Immature
62	"I Like"	Montell Jordan featuring Slick Rick
63	"Ain't No Nigga" / "Dead Presidents	Jay-Z featuring Foxy Brown
64	"Ever Since You Went Away"	Art n' Soul
65	"Renee"	Lost Boyz
66	"Tell Me"	Groove Theory
67	"Diggin' on You"	TLC
68	"Where Ever You Are"	Terry Ellis
69	"If I Ruled the World (Imagine That)"	Nas
70	"Blackberry Molasses"	Mista
71	"Ain't Nobody" / "Kissing You"	Faith Evans
72	"Never Too Busy"	Kenny Lattimore
73	"Your Secret Love"	Luther Vandross
74	"This Is for the Lover in You"	Babyface featuring LL Cool J, Howard Hewett, Jody Watley, and Jeffrey Daniel
75	"Fu-Gee-La"	Fugees
76	"Steelo"	702 featuring Missy Elliott
77	"One for the Money"	Horace Brown
78	"Slow Jams"	Quincy Jones featuring Babyface and Tamia with Portrait and Barry White
79	"Let's Lay Together"	The Isley Brothers
80	"Falling"	Montell Jordan
81	"Me and Those Dreamin' Eyes of Mine"	D'Angelo
82	"Can't Be Wasting My Time"	Mona Lisa featuring Lost Boyz
83	"They Don't Care About Us"	Michael Jackson
84	"You Put a Move on My Heart"	Quincy Jones featuring Tamia
85	"Cruisin'"	D'Angelo
86	"Fantasy"	Mariah Carey
87	"Un-Break My Heart"	Toni Braxton
88	"Floatin' On Your Love"	The Isley Brothers featuring Angela Winbush
89	"Don't Wanna Lose You"	Lionel Richie
90	"Why Does It Hurt So Bad"	Whitney Houston
91	"Let's Get the Mood Right"	Johnny Gill
92	"Hooked on You"	Silk
93	"Please Don't Go"	Immature
94	"Back to the World"	Tevin Campbell
95	"In the Hood"	Donell Jones
96	"Keep Tryin'"	Groove Theory
97	"Stairway to Heaven"	Pure Soul
98	"Bow Down"	Westside Connection
99	"Scarred"	Luke featuring Trick Daddy and Verb
100	"1, 2, 3, 4 (Sumpin' New)"	Coolio

== See also ==
- 1996 in music
- Billboard Year-End Hot 100 singles of 1996
- Billboard Year-End Hot Rap Singles of 1996
- List of number-one R&B singles of 1996 (U.S.)
