= List of Billboard Hot 100 top-ten singles in 1996 =

This is a list of singles that charted in the top ten of the Billboard Hot 100 during 1996.

Mariah Carey, R. Kelly, LL Cool J, and Whitney Houston each had three top-ten hits in 1996, tying them for the most top-ten hits during the year.

== Top-ten singles ==
Key

- ↑ – indicates single's top 10 entry was also its Hot 100 debut
- † – indicates Best performing song of the year
- (#) – 1996 Year-end top 10 single position and rank

List of Billboard Hot 100 top ten singles which peaked in 1996
Top ten entry date	Single	Artist(s)	Peak	Peak date	Weeks in top ten
Singles from 1995
November 11	"Name"	Goo Goo Dolls	5	January 27	15
December 23	"Breakfast at Tiffany's"	Deep Blue Something	5	January 20	8
December 30	"Free as a Bird" ↑	The Beatles	6	January 6	2
Singles from 1996
January 13	"Missing"	Everything but the Girl	2	February 17	13
January 20	"One Of Us"	Joan Osborne	4	February 3	10
January 27	"Be My Lover"	La Bouche	6	February 24	8
February 3	"Nobody Knows" (#4)	The Tony Rich Project	2	March 23	23
February 10	"Not Gon' Cry"	Mary J. Blige	2	February 24	10
February 17	"Sittin' Up in My Room"	Brandy	2	March 9	11
February 24	"Jesus to a Child" ↑	George Michael	7	February 24	2
March 2	"Follow You Down" / "Til I Hear It from You"	Gin Blossoms	9	March 9	8
March 9	"Wonderwall"	Oasis	8	March 9	1
March 9	"Down Low (Nobody Has to Know)"	R. Kelly featuring The Isley Brothers	4	March 30	11
March 16	"Because You Loved Me" (#3)	Céline Dion	1	March 23	19
March 23	"Ironic"	Alanis Morissette	4	April 13	15
March 30	"Lady"	D'Angelo	10	March 30	1
April 6	"Always Be My Baby" ↑ (#5)	Mariah Carey	1	May 4	15
April 6	"1, 2, 3, 4 (Sumpin' New)"	Coolio	5	April 27	8
April 13	"Doin' It"	LL Cool J	9	April 13	1
April 20	"Woo Hah!! Got You All in Check"	Busta Rhymes	8	April 20	3
April 20	"You're The One" ↑	SWV	5	June 8	10
April 20	"Count On Me"	Whitney Houston and CeCe Winans	8	May 4	7
May 11	"Tha Crossroads" ↑ (#7)	Bone Thugs-N-Harmony	1	May 18	12
May 11	"Give Me One Reason" (#6)	Tracy Chapman	3	June 15	17
June 1	"Fastlove"	George Michael	8	June 1	3
June 1	"Keep On, Keepin' On"	MC Lyte featuring Xscape	10	June 1	1
June 8	"You're Makin' Me High" / "Let It Flow" ↑ (#9)	Toni Braxton	1	July 27	20
June 8	"Until It Sleeps" ↑	Metallica	10	June 8	1
June 15	"Theme from Mission: Impossible"	Adam Clayton and Larry Mullen	7	June 22	4
June 22	"How Do U Want It" / "California Love"	2Pac featuring K-Ci & JoJo / featuring Dr. Dre	1	July 13	11
June 29	"Macarena (Bayside Boys Remix)" † (#1)	Los Del Rio	1	August 3	23
July 6	"Why I Love You So Much" / "Ain't Nobody"	Monica	9	July 6	2
July 13	"Twisted" (#10)	Keith Sweat	2	August 17	18
July 13	"C'mon N' Ride It (The Train)"	Quad City DJ's	3	August 17	15
July 20	"I Can't Sleep Baby (If I)"	R. Kelly	5	August 3	10
July 20	"Change the World" ↑	Eric Clapton	5	August 17	16
July 27	"You Learn" / "You Oughta Know" ↑	Alanis Morissette	6	July 27	7
August 3	"Loungin"	LL Cool J featuring Total	3	August 24	11
August 17	"I Love You Always Forever" (#8)	Donna Lewis	2	August 24	16
August 31	"Hit Me Off" ↑	New Edition	3	August 31	2
September 14	"It's All Coming Back to Me Now"	Céline Dion	2	October 26	19
September 28	"Where Do You Go"	No Mercy	5	October 12	12
October 12	"Last Night"	Az Yet	9	October 19	4
October 19	"No Diggity"	Blackstreet featuring Dr. Dre	1	November 9	18
October 26	"This Is for the Lover in You" ↑	Babyface	6	November 9	5
October 26	"Mouth"	Merril Bainbridge	4	November 23	15
November 2	"Un-Break My Heart"	Toni Braxton	1	December 7	25
November 9	"Nobody"	Keith Sweat featuring Athena Cage	3	December 7	18
November 16	"Pony"	Ginuwine	6	November 23	6
December 7	"I Finally Found Someone"	Barbra Streisand and Bryan Adams	8	December 7	5
December 21	"I Believe I Can Fly"	R. Kelly	2	December 21	16

=== 1995 peaks ===
List of Billboard Hot 100 top ten singles in 1996 which peaked in 1995
Top ten entry date	Single	Artist(s)	Peak	Peak date	Weeks in top ten
August 26	"Gangsta's Paradise"	Coolio featuring L.V.	1	September 9	22
September 30	"Fantasy" ↑	Mariah Carey	1	September 30	16
November 25	"Exhale (Shoop Shoop)" ↑	Whitney Houston	1	November 25	15
November 25	"Hey Lover"	LL Cool J	3	December 2	14
November 25	"Diggin' on You"	TLC	5	December 30	9
December 2	"One Sweet Day" ↑ (#2)	Mariah Carey and Boyz II Men	1	December 2	19
December 9	"You'll See" ↑	Madonna	6	December 16	5
December 30	"Before You Walk Out of My Life"	Monica	7	December 30	5

=== 1997 peaks ===
List of Billboard Hot 100 top ten singles in 1996 which peaked in 1997
Top ten entry date	Single	Artist(s)	Peak	Peak date	Weeks in top ten
November 30	"Don't Let Go (Love)"	En Vogue	2	January 18	17
November 30	"I'm Still in Love with You"	New Edition	7	January 11	11
December 28	"I Believe in You and Me" ↑	Whitney Houston	4	February 1	9

== See also ==
- 1996 in music
- List of Billboard Hot 100 number ones of 1996
- Billboard Year-End Hot 100 singles of 1996
