= Crucial Conflict discography =

- Studio albums: 3
- Extended plays: 1
- Compilation albums: 1
- Singles: 10
- Mixtapes: 1

The discography of the American Chicago hip hop group Crucial Conflict consists of three studio albums, one extended play, one compilation album, one mixtape and ten singles.

== Albums ==
=== Studio albums ===
List of studio albums, with selected chart positions and certifications
Title	Album details	Peak chart positions		Certifications
Title	Album details	US	US R&B	Certifications
The Final Tic	Released: July 2, 1996; Label: Pallas Records/Universal; Format: CD, cassette, digital download, LP	12	5	RIAA: Gold
Good Side, Bad Side	Released: October 20, 1998; Label: Pallas Records/Universal; Format: CD, cassette, digital download	38	10	
Planet Crucon	Released: January 29, 2008; Label: Buckwild Records; Format: CD, digital download	—	73	

=== Extended plays ===
Year	Album
1993	Crucial Times: Released: July 2, 1993; Label: TCR&R Productions; Format: CD, cassette

=== Compilation albums ===
Year	Album
2001	The Call of the Wild: Released: October 9, 2001; Label: Buckwild Records; Format: CD

=== Mixtapes ===
- Ill-Legal: The Street Mix Tape

== Singles ==
List of singles as lead artist, with selected chart positions and certifications, showing year released and album name
Title	Year	Peak chart positions							Certifications	Album
Title	Year	US	US R&B	US R&B Air	US R&B Stream	US Rap	US Rhythmic	NZ	Certifications	Album
"Hay"	1996	18	10	24	19	2	36	3	RIAA: Gold	The Final Tic
"Ride the Rodeo"	1996	—	—	62	88	—	—	26		The Final Tic
"—" denotes a recording that did not chart or was not released in that territory.

=== Promotional singles ===
List of promotional singles, showing year released and album name
Year	Single	Album
1993	"Crucial Times"	Crucial Times
1996	"Showdown"	The Final Tic
1998	"Scummy"	Good Side, Bad Side
1998	"Ghetto Queen" (featuring R. Kelly)	Good Side, Bad Side and R.
2007	"Ride Out Dip"	Planet Crucon

== Guest appearances ==
List of non-single guest appearances, with other performing artists, showing year released and album name
Title	Year	Other artist(s)	Album
"Bogus Mayn"	1996	—	Rhyme & Reason (soundtrack)
"When the Playas Live"	1997	—	Def Jam's How to Be a Player (soundtrack)
"Throw Your Sets"	1999	Three 6 Mafia	CrazyNDaLazDayz
"Stabbers"	1999	Project Pat	Ghetty Green
"Dollars Make Sense"	1999	Warren G	I Want It All
"Grind On"	1999	B-Def	Prince of the City
"Body on the Block"	2007	Triple Darkness	Last Dayz
"World Wide Players"	2008	Big Sha	Хляб и амфети
"The Liquor"	2012	Willie Taylor	The Reintroduction of Willie Taylor
