= Billboard Year-End Hot Rap Singles of 1996 =

American music chart

This is a list of Billboard magazine's Top Hot Rap Singles of 1996.

| No. | Title | Artist(s) |
|---|---|---|
| 1 | "How Do U Want It" / "California Love" | 2Pac featuring K-Ci & JoJo |
| 2 | "Tha Crossroads" | Bone Thugs-n-Harmony |
| 3 | "Loungin" | LL Cool J featuring Total |
| 4 | "Get Money" | Junior M.A.F.I.A. |
| 5 | "Keep On Keepin' On" | MC Lyte featuring Xscape |
| 6 | "Elevators (Me & You)" | Outkast |
| 7 | "C'mon N' Ride It (The Train)" | Quad City DJ's |
| 8 | "Woo-Hah!! Got You All in Check" | Busta Rhymes |
| 9 | "Po Pimp" | Do or Die featuring Twista |
| 10 | "Hey Lover" | LL Cool J featuring Boyz II Men |
| 11 | "Tonite's tha Night" | Kris Kross |
| 12 | "Hay" | Crucial Conflict |
| 13 | "5 O'Clock" | Nonchalant |
| 14 | "Doin' It" | LL Cool J |
| 15 | "Fu-Gee-La" | Fugees |
| 16 | "Ain't No Nigga" / "Dead Presidents" | Jay-Z featuring Foxy Brown |
| 17 | "Renee" | Lost Boyz |
| 18 | "Bow Down" | Westside Connection |
| 19 | "Scarred" | Luke featuring Trick Daddy and Verb |
| 20 | "Cell Therapy" | Goodie Mob |
| 21 | "Gangsta's Paradise" | Coolio featuring L.V. |
| 22 | "1, 2, 3, 4 (Sumpin' New)" | Coolio |
| 23 | "Sittin' on Top of the World" | Da Brat |
| 24 | "Danger" | Blahzay Blahzay |
| 25 | "All I See" | A+ |
| 26 | "Music Makes Me High" | Lost Boyz |
| 27 | "Wu-Wear: The Garment Renaissance" | RZA featuring Method Man and Cappadonna |
| 28 | "Soul Food" | Goodie Mob |
| 29 | "No Time" | Lil' Kim featuring Puff Daddy |
| 30 | "It's a Party" | Busta Rhymes featuring Zhané |
| 31 | "Mr. Ice Cream Man" | Master P featuring Silkk the Shocker |
| 32 | "Tres Delinquentes" | Delinquent Habits |
| 33 | "It's All the Way Live (Now)" | Coolio |
| 34 | "Can't Knock the Hustle" | Jay-Z featuring Mary J. Blige |
| 35 | "Beware of My Crew" | LBC Crew featuring Tray D and South Sentrell |
| 36 | "Just tah Let U Know" | Eazy-E |
| 37 | "Shadowboxin'" | GZA featuring Method Man |
| 38 | "Let's Play House" | Tha Dogg Pound featuring Michel'le |
| 39 | "Live and Die for Hip Hop" | Kris Kross featuring Aaliyah, Da Brat, Jermaine Dupri and Mr. Black |
| 40 | "What's Love Got to Do with It" | Warren G featuring Adina Howard |
| 41 | "Paparazzi" | Xzibit |
| 42 | "Nasty Dancer" / "White Horse" | Kilo |
| 43 | "Street Dreams" | Nas |
| 44 | "The World Is a Ghetto" | Geto Boys |
| 45 | "Leflaur Leflah Eshkoshka" | Heltah Skeltah and O.G.C. as The Fab 5 |
| 46 | "Hang 'Em High" | Sadat X |
| 47 | "Funkorama" | Redman |
| 48 | "Hurricane" | The Click |
| 49 | "Envy" / "Firewater" | Fat Joe |
| 50 | "Too Hot" | Coolio |

== See also ==
- 1996 in music
- Billboard Year-End Hot 100 singles of 1996
- Billboard Year-End Hot R&B Singles of 1996
- List of Billboard number-one rap singles of 1996
