= List of number-one R&B singles of 1996 (U.S.) =

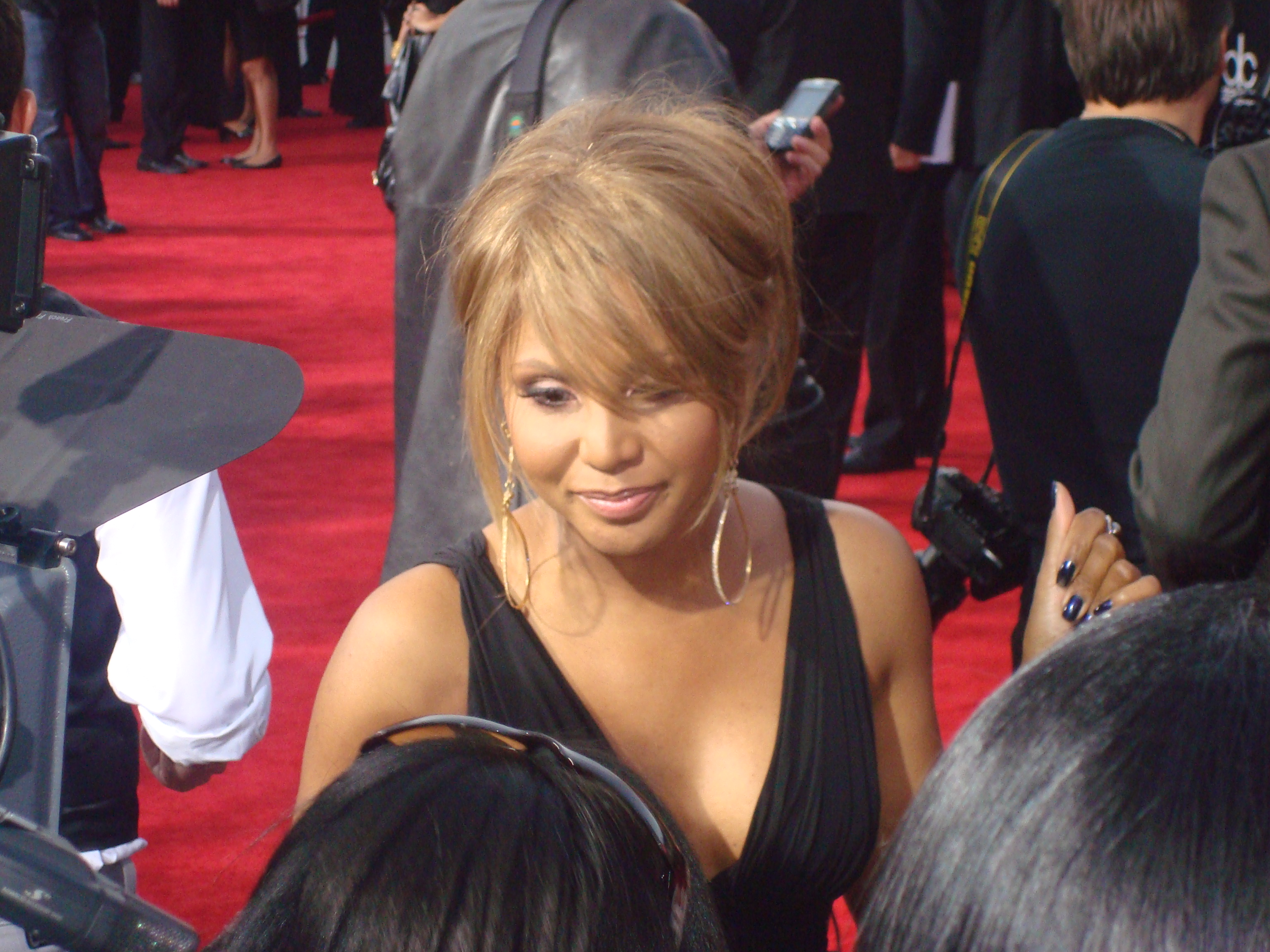
Toni Braxton (pictured in 2009) spent two non-consecutive weeks at number one with "You're Makin' Me High" / "Let It Flow".

These are the Billboard magazine R&B singles chart number one hits of 1996:

== Chart history ==
Key
†	Indicates best-charting R&B single of 1996

Issue Date	Song	Artist
January 6	"Exhale (Shoop Shoop)"	Whitney Houston
January 13	"Exhale (Shoop Shoop)"	Whitney Houston
January 20	"Before You Walk out of My Life" / "Like This and Like That"	Monica
January 27	"Before You Walk out of My Life" / "Like This and Like That"	Monica
February 3	"Not Gon' Cry"	Mary J. Blige
February 10	"Not Gon' Cry"	Mary J. Blige
February 17	"Not Gon' Cry"	Mary J. Blige
February 24	"Not Gon' Cry"	Mary J. Blige
March 2	"Not Gon' Cry"	Mary J. Blige
March 9	"Down Low (Nobody Has to Know)"	R. Kelly featuring Ronald Isley
March 16	"Down Low (Nobody Has to Know)"	R. Kelly featuring Ronald Isley
March 23	"Down Low (Nobody Has to Know)"	R. Kelly featuring Ronald Isley
March 30	"Down Low (Nobody Has to Know)"	R. Kelly featuring Ronald Isley
April 6	"Down Low (Nobody Has to Know)"	R. Kelly featuring Ronald Isley
April 13	"Down Low (Nobody Has to Know)"	R. Kelly featuring Ronald Isley
April 20	"Down Low (Nobody Has to Know)"	R. Kelly featuring Ronald Isley
April 27	"You're the One"	SWV
May 4	"Always Be My Baby"	Mariah Carey
May 11	"Tha Crossroads"	Bone Thugs-n-Harmony
May 18	"Tha Crossroads"	Bone Thugs-n-Harmony
May 25	"Tha Crossroads"	Bone Thugs-n-Harmony
June 1	"Tha Crossroads"	Bone Thugs-n-Harmony
June 8	"Tha Crossroads"	Bone Thugs-n-Harmony
June 15	"Tha Crossroads"	Bone Thugs-n-Harmony
June 22	"Tha Crossroads"	Bone Thugs-n-Harmony
June 29	"You're Makin' Me High" / "Let It Flow" †	Toni Braxton
July 6	"How Do U Want It" / "California Love"	2Pac featuring K-Ci & JoJo / featuring Dr. Dre and Roger Troutman
July 13	"How Do U Want It" / "California Love"	2Pac featuring K-Ci & JoJo / featuring Dr. Dre and Roger Troutman
July 20	"How Do U Want It" / "California Love"	2Pac featuring K-Ci & JoJo / featuring Dr. Dre and Roger Troutman
July 27	"You're Makin' Me High" / "Let It Flow" †	Toni Braxton
August 3	"I Can't Sleep Baby (If I)"	R. Kelly
August 10	"I Can't Sleep Baby (If I)"	R. Kelly
August 17	"Twisted"	Keith Sweat
August 24	"Twisted"	Keith Sweat
August 31	"Hit Me Off"	New Edition
September 7	"Hit Me Off"	New Edition
September 14	"Hit Me Off"	New Edition
September 21	"Twisted"	Keith Sweat
September 28	"If Your Girl Only Knew"	Aaliyah
October 5	"If Your Girl Only Knew"	Aaliyah
October 12	"Last Night"	Az Yet
October 19	"No Diggity"	Blackstreet featuring Dr. Dre
October 26	"No Diggity"	Blackstreet featuring Dr. Dre
November 2	"No Diggity"	Blackstreet featuring Dr. Dre
November 9	"No Diggity"	Blackstreet featuring Dr. Dre
November 16	"Pony"	Ginuwine
November 23	"Pony"	Ginuwine
November 30	"Nobody"	Keith Sweat featuring Athena Cage
December 7	"Nobody"	Keith Sweat featuring Athena Cage
December 14	"Nobody"	Keith Sweat featuring Athena Cage
December 21	"I Believe I Can Fly"	R. Kelly
December 28	"I Believe I Can Fly"	R. Kelly

== See also ==
- 1996 in music
- Billboard Year-End Hot R&B Singles of 1996
- List of number-one R&B hits (United States)
- List of number-one R&B albums of 1996 (U.S.)
