= Keith Sweat (album) =

Studio album by Keith Sweat
- Released: June 25, 1996
- Studios: The Sweat Shop, Deep, Southern Tracks (Atlanta)
- Genres: Urban soul; new jack swing
- Length: 48:28
- Label: Elektra
- Producers: C-Love; Doc; H.O.P.; Eric McCaine; Fitzgerald Scott; Keith Sweat; Tizone; Alphonso "Doc" Walker; William "Billy Bad" Ward

Keith Sweat chronology
Get Up On It (1994)	Keith Sweat (1996)	Still in the Game (1998)

Singles from Keith Sweat
- 1. "Twisted" Released: June 4, 1996; 2. "Nobody" Released: September 17, 1996; 3. "Just a Touch" Released: 1997; 4. "Come with Me" Released: 1997

Keith Sweat is the fifth studio album by the American singer Keith Sweat. It was released by Elektra Records on June 25, 1996, in the United States. The single, "Twisted", made it to number two on the US Billboard Hot 100, his biggest hit ever on that chart. "Nobody" peaked at number 3 on the same chart. Both songs are his final two of six hits to reach number one on the R&B singles chart and gave Sweat two more Top 5 pop hits in nearly ten years since his first single, "I Want Her".

== Critical reception ==
Professional ratings
Review scores
Source	Rating
AllMusic	3/5 stars
Robert Christgau	(neither)
Entertainment Weekly	C−
Hartford Courant	(favorable)
Los Angeles Times	3/4 stars
Muzik	2/5 stars
Vibe	(favorable)
USA Today	2.5/4 stars

AllMusic editor Leo Stanley found that "Sweat turns in a typically stylish and sophisticated set of urban soul and new jack swing, all highlighted by his silky singing. Sweat's main talent is for smooth ballads, and Keith Sweat is filled with excellent selections, including the seductive 'Come with Me', which features guest vocals by Ronald Isley. The album does bog down a bit with uneven material, but its high points are as captivating as any of Sweat's previous work." In a lukewarm review, Los Angeles Times writer Connie Johnson wrote "what sounded new in 1987 may not be groundbreaking today, but Sweat can still crank out a Jeep jam or a temperature-teasing boudoir ballad with the best of them."

== Chart performance ==
The album is the most successful of Sweat's career. It went to the US Billboard 200, debuting at number 5; it was the final of five consecutive albums from the artist to reach number one on the Top R&B Albums chart. The album has occasionally re-entered the Billboard 200, with the most recent occurrence being the week of February 19, 2011. On July 7, 2004, Keith Sweat was certified quadruple platinum by the Recording Industry Association of America (RIAA), for shipments of four million copies in the United States. In 1996, the singles "Twisted" and "Nobody" were both certified platinum by the RIAA, for shipments of one million copies in the US.

== Track listing ==
Keith Sweat track listing
No.	Title	Writer(s)	Producer(s)	Length
1.	"Twisted" (featuring Kut Klose and Pretty Russ)	Lavonn Battle; Athena Cage; Tabitha Duncan; Eric McCaine; Keith Sweat	McCaine	4:30
2.	"Funky Dope Lovin'" (featuring Gerald Levert, Aaron Hall and Buddy Banks)	William "Billy Bad" Ward	Ward	4:51
3.	"Yumi"	McCaine; Sweat	McCaine	4:21
4.	"Whatever You Want"	Fitzgerald Scott; Sweat	Scott	4:18
5.	"Just a Touch"	Steve Arrington; Mark Hicks; Raye Turner; Danny Webster; Starleana Young; Carter Bradley; Floyd Miller; Orion Wilhiote; Stephen Washington; Tom Dozier; Thomas Lockett	H.O.P. Productions	5:03
6.	"Freak with Me" (featuring Lil' Bud and Tizone)	John Howcott; Emanuel Officer; Donald Parks; Sweat	H.O.P. Productions	4:44
7.	"Nature's Rising (Interlude)"	Craig Love; Sweat	C-Love	0:55
8.	"Come with Me" (featuring Ronald Isley)	Love; Scott; Sweat	Scott	3:56
9.	"In the Mood"	McCaine; Sweat	McCaine	3:45
10.	"Show Me the Way (Interlude)"	Allen "Grip" Smith; Sweat	Sweat	2:50
11.	"Nobody" (featuring Athena Cage)	Scott; Sweat	Scott	4:24
12.	"Chocolate Girl"	Sweat; Alphonso "Doc" Walker	Walker; Tizone	4:45
Total length:				48:28

== Personnel ==
- Keith Sweat – vocals, producer, executive producer
- Eric McCaine – producer, engineer, vocals, programmer, musician
- Donald Parks – producer, musician, vocals
- Emanuel Officer – producer
- John Howcott – producer, musician
- Darryl Adams – vocal backing
- Michael Alvord – engineer
- Karl Heilbron – engineer
- Alex Nesmith – mixing
- J. Bernanski Wall – mixing
- Karl Heilbron – mixing
- Neal H. Pogue – mixing
- Fitzgerald Scott – keyboards, drum programming
- William "Billy Bad" Ward – keyboards, drum programming
- Allen "Grip" Smith – keyboards, drum programming
- Buddy Banks – vocals
- Athena Cage – vocals, performer
- Doc – producer
- Traci Hale – vocal backing
- Charlie Singleton – guitar
- Aaron Hall – vocals
- Ronald Isley – vocals, performer
- Kut Klose – background vocals
- Gerald Levert – vocals
- Lil' Bud – rap
- Pretty Russ – rap
- Tizone – producer, rap
- Tamica Johnson – rap
- Herb Powers – mastering

== Charts ==
=== Weekly charts ===
1996 weekly chart performance for Keith Sweat
Chart (1996)	Peak position
Australian Albums (ARIA)	41
Dutch Albums (Album Top 100)	19
German Albums (Offizielle Top 100)	84
New Zealand Albums (RMNZ)	39
UK Albums (Official Charts)	36
US Billboard 200	5
US Top R&B/Hip-Hop Albums (Billboard)	1

2025 weekly chart performance for Keith Sweat
Chart (2025)	Peak position
Hungarian Physical Albums (MAHASZ)	13

=== Year-end charts ===
Year-end chart performance for Keith Sweat
Chart (1996)	Position
US Billboard 200	32
US Top R&B/Hip-Hop Albums (Billboard)	6
Chart (1997)	Position
US Billboard 200	33
US Top R&B/Hip-Hop Albums (Billboard)	29

== Certifications ==
Certifications for Keith Sweat
Region	Certification	Certified units/sales
Canada (Music Canada)	Gold	50,000^{^}
United States (RIAA)	4× Platinum	4,000,000^{^}
^{^} Shipments figures based on certification alone.

== See also ==
- List of Billboard number-one R&B albums of 1996
