= Good Side, Bad Side =

Good Side, Bad Side may refer to:

- Good Side, Bad Side (Crucial Conflict album), 1998
- Good Side, Bad Side (Master P album), 2004
