= List of Billboard 200 number-one albums of 1995 =

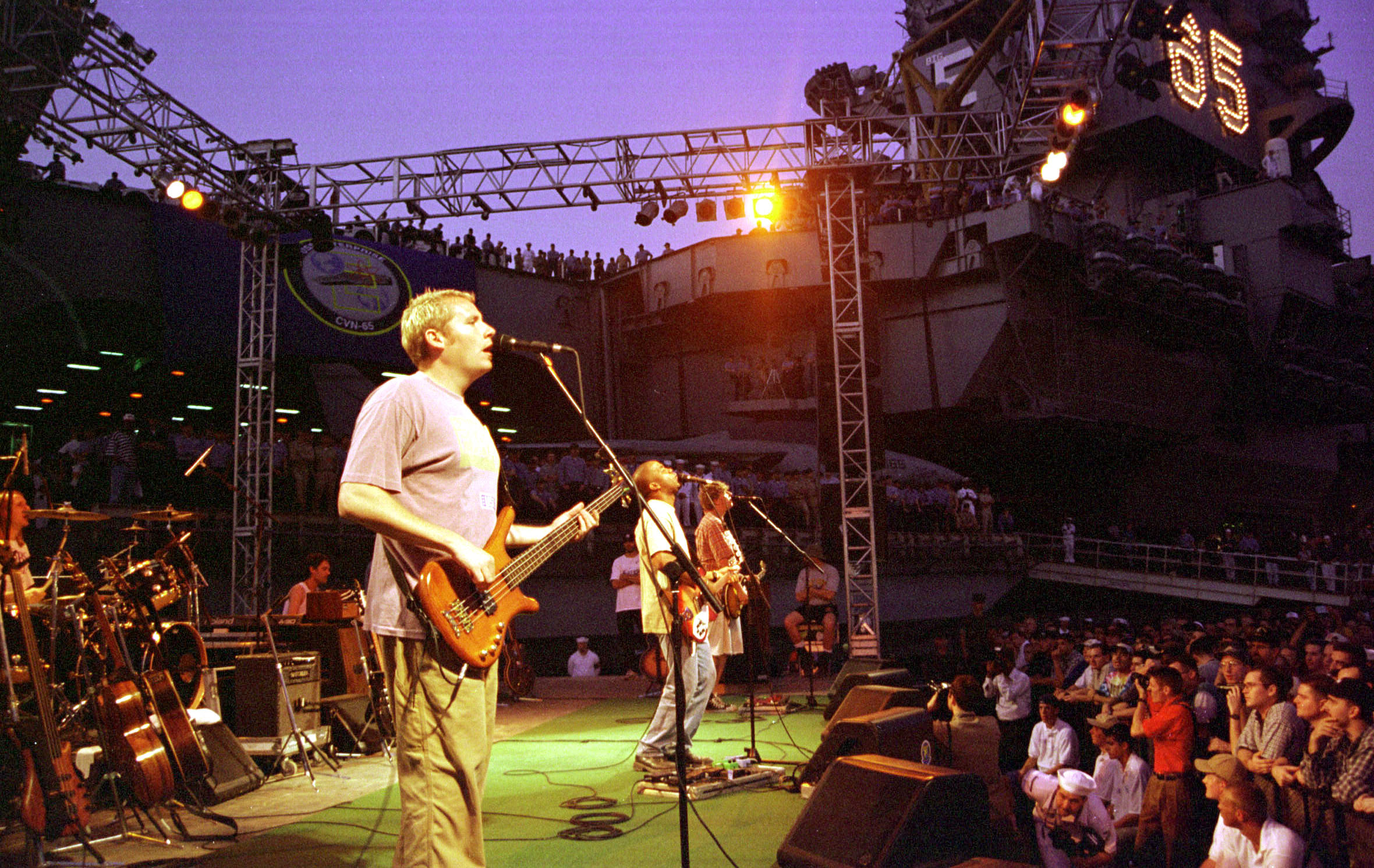
Cracked Rear View by Hootie and the Blowfish was the best-selling album of 1995

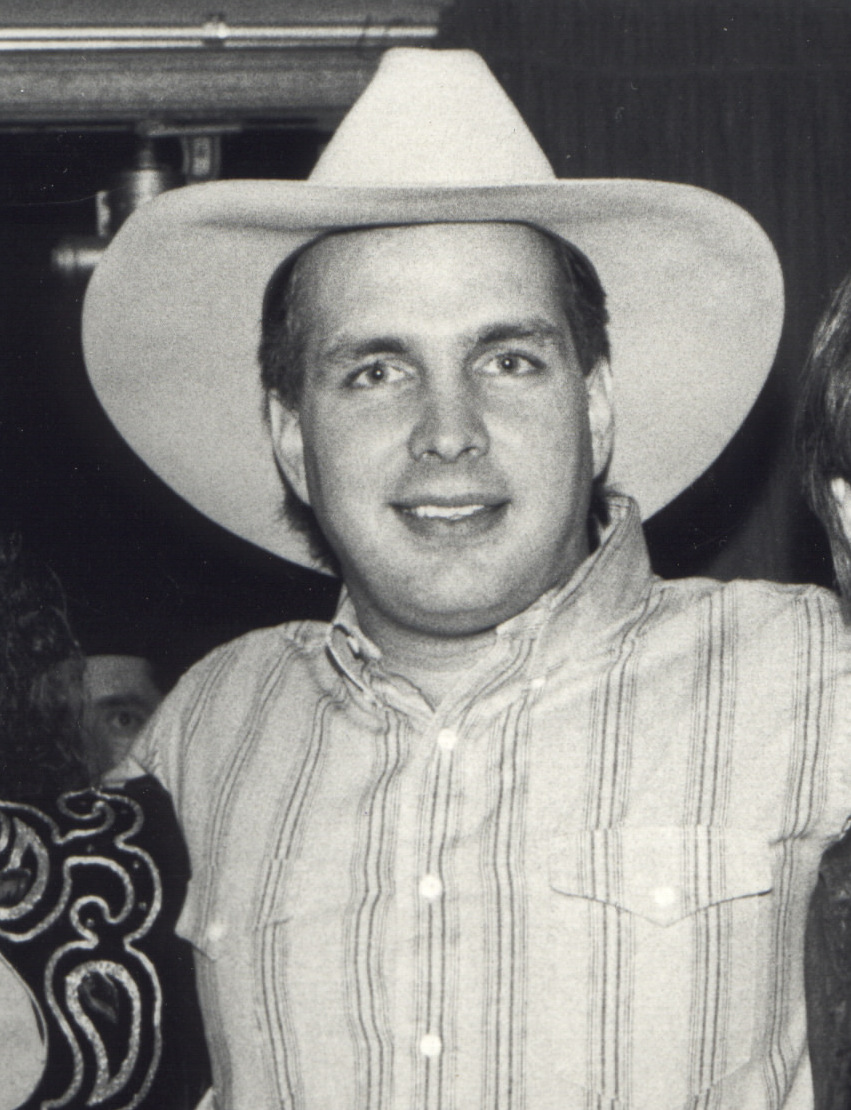
Garth Brooks' greatest hits album The Hits had the biggest sales week of 1995, selling over 900,000 copies in a single week.

These are the Billboard magazine number-one albums of 1995, per the Billboard 200.

== Chart history ==
Key
†	Indicates best performing album of 1995

Issue date	Album	Artist(s)	Label	Sales	Ref.
January 7	The Hits	Garth Brooks	Liberty	907,000	
January 14	The Hits	Garth Brooks	Liberty	516,000	
January 21	The Hits	Garth Brooks	Liberty	352,000	
January 28	The Hits	Garth Brooks	Liberty	240,000	
February 4	The Hits	Garth Brooks	Liberty	238,000	
February 11	Balance	Van Halen	Warner Bros.	295,000	
February 18	The Hits	Garth Brooks	Liberty	153,000	
February 25	The Hits	Garth Brooks	Liberty	150,000	
March 4	The Hits	Garth Brooks	Liberty	146,000	
March 11	II	Boyz II Men	Motown	113,000	
March 18	Greatest Hits	Bruce Springsteen	Columbia	251,000	
March 25	Greatest Hits	Bruce Springsteen	Columbia	168,000	
April 1	Me Against the World	2Pac	Interscope	240,000	
April 8	Me Against the World	2Pac	Interscope	197,000	
April 15	Me Against the World	2Pac	Interscope	149,000	
April 22	Me Against the World	2Pac	Interscope	113,000	
April 29	The Lion King	Elton John / Soundtrack	Walt Disney	133,500	
May 6	Throwing Copper	Live	Radioactive	117,500	
May 13	Friday	Soundtrack	Priority	121,000	
May 20	Friday	Soundtrack	Priority	123,000	
May 27	Cracked Rear View †	Hootie & the Blowfish	Atlantic	125,000	
June 3	Cracked Rear View †	Hootie & the Blowfish	Atlantic	113,000	
June 10	Cracked Rear View †	Hootie & the Blowfish	Atlantic	120,000	
June 17	Cracked Rear View †	Hootie & the Blowfish	Atlantic	128,000	
June 24	P•U•L•S•E	Pink Floyd	Columbia	198,000	
July 1	Cracked Rear View †	Hootie & the Blowfish	Atlantic	170,000	
July 8	HIStory: Past, Present and Future, Book I	Michael Jackson	Epic	391,000	
July 15	HIStory: Past, Present and Future, Book I	Michael Jackson	Epic	263,000	
July 22	Pocahontas	Soundtrack	Walt Disney	192,000	
July 29	Cracked Rear View †	Hootie & the Blowfish	Atlantic	144,000	
August 5	Dreaming of You	Selena	EMI Latin	331,000	
August 12	E. 1999 Eternal	Bone Thugs-n-Harmony	Ruthless	307,000	
August 19	E. 1999 Eternal	Bone Thugs-n-Harmony	Ruthless	222,000	
August 26	Cracked Rear View †	Hootie & the Blowfish	Atlantic	184,000	
September 2	Dangerous Minds	Soundtrack	MCA	210,000	
September 9	Dangerous Minds	Soundtrack	MCA	256,000	
September 16	Dangerous Minds	Soundtrack	MCA	208,000	
September 23	Dangerous Minds	Soundtrack	MCA	182,500	
September 30	Cracked Rear View	Hootie & the Blowfish	Atlantic	167,000	
October 7	Jagged Little Pill	Alanis Morissette	Maverick	148,000	
October 14	Jagged Little Pill	Alanis Morissette	Maverick	142,000	
October 21	Daydream	Mariah Carey	Columbia	224,000	
October 28	Daydream	Mariah Carey	Columbia	216,000	
November 4	Daydream	Mariah Carey	Columbia	170,000	
November 11	Mellon Collie and the Infinite Sadness	The Smashing Pumpkins	Virgin	246,500	
November 18	Dogg Food	Tha Dogg Pound	Death Row	277,500	
November 25	Alice in Chains	Alice in Chains	Columbia	189,000	
December 2	R. Kelly	R. Kelly	Jive	248,500	
December 9	Anthology 1	The Beatles	Apple	855,473	
December 16	Anthology 1	The Beatles	Apple	453,000	
December 23	Anthology 1	The Beatles	Apple	435,000	
December 30	Daydream	Mariah Carey	Columbia	486,000	

== See also ==
- 1995 in music
- List of number-one albums (United States)
