= How Many Ways =

- US CD edition

Single by Toni Braxton

from the album Toni Braxton
- A-side: "I Belong to You"
- Released: June 10, 1994
- Studio: Newark Sound Studios (Newark, New Jersey)
- Genre: New jack swing; hip hop soul
- Length: 4:45
- Label: LaFace
- Songwriters: Vincent Herbert; Toni Braxton; Ben Garrison; Noel Goring; Keith Miller (Note: Despite not being credited as songwriters of "How Many Ways" in the liner notes of Toni Braxton, Keith Miller, Philip Field, and Anthony Beard are listed as songwriters by ASCAP and BMI.); Philip Field; Anthony Beard
- Producers: Vincent Herbert; R. Kelly (remix)

Toni Braxton singles chronology
"You Mean the World to Me" (1994)	"I Belong to You" / "How Many Ways" (1994)	"You're Makin' Me High" / "Let It Flow" (1996)

"How Many Ways" is a song by American singer Toni Braxton. It was written by Braxton, Vincent Herbert, Philip Field, Joe Thomas, Ben Garrison, Keith Miller, and Noel Goring for her self-titled debut album (1993), while production was helmed by Herbert. The song is built around a sample of "God Make Me Funky" (1975) by American jazz-fusion band The Headhunters featuring Pointer Sisters. Due to the inclusion of the sample, several other writers are credited as songwriters. Lyrically, the protagonist of the composition declares there are many ways in which she loves her man.

The song was released as the album's fifth and final single on June 10, 1994, by LaFace and Arista Records, a double-A-side along with "I Belong to You". It peaked at number 28 on the US Billboard Hot 100 on January 21, 1995. A remix version of "How Many Ways", produced by R. Kelly, also was released to radio and music television stations. An accompanying music video features Braxton and actor Shemar Moore riding in a car, frolicking in a playground, and on a veranda.

== Critical reception ==
Larry Flick from Billboard magazine wrote that the song "benefits from a refreshing R. Kelly remix that plugs into current top 40 and R&B radio trends. On its own merit, the song is a romantic ballad with an instantly memorable chorus. Braxton provides added dimension with a sultry, well-shaded vocal that is a reminder of why she is among the leading urban divas of the moment. What else can be said?" Ralph Tee from the Record Mirror Dance Update called it a "somewhat stodgy ballad", but praised Braxton's "top-of-the-range soul vocal."

== Music video ==
The music video for "How Many Ways" was directed by Lionel C. Martin and executive produced by Bille Woodruff. The visuals were largely filmed in Miami.

== Track listings ==
- US double A-side CD/cassette single
1. "I Belong to You" (Rollerskate Radio Mix) – 4:21
2. "I Belong to You" (Soulpower Mix w/o Rap) – 5:41
3. "I Belong to You" (Album Version) – 3:53
4. "How Many Ways" (R. Kelly Remix Extended - No Talk) – 5:46
5. "How Many Ways" (Album Version) – 4:45
6. "How Many Ways" (The VH1 Mix) – 4:17
- US 12-inch maxi single ("How Many Ways/I Belong to You")
1. "How Many Ways" (R. Kelly Remix, Extended w/ Rap) – 5:46
2. "How Many Ways" (Bad Boy Remix, Extended Mix) – 7:02
3. "How Many Ways" (Bad Boy Instrumental) – 6:53
4. "I Belong to You" (Rollerskate Radio Mix) – 4:21
5. "I Belong to You" (Soulpower Mix w/o Rap) – 5:41
6. "I Belong to You" (Soulpower Instrumental) – 5:57
- US promotional CD single
1. "How Many Ways" (Radio Edit Album Version) – 4:20
2. "How Many Ways" (R. Kelly Radio Edit) – 4:02
3. "How Many Ways" (The VH1 Radio Edit) – 4:17
4. "How Many Ways" (Bad Boy Mix Radio Edit) – 4:17

== Credits and personnel ==
Credits lifted from Toni Braxton's liner notes.

- Anthony Beard – writing
- Toni Braxton – vocals, writing
- Philip Field – writing
- Ben Garrison – mixing, recording, writing
- Chris Gehringer – mastering
- Noel Goring – music, writing
- Vince Herbert – mixing, music, production
- Keith Miller – writing

== Charts ==
=== Weekly charts ===
Weekly chart performance for "How Many Ways"
Chart (1994–1995)	Peak position
US Billboard Hot 100 with "I Belong to You"	28
US Dance Singles Sales (Billboard) with "I Belong to You"	8
US Hot R&B/Hip-Hop Songs (Billboard) with "I Belong to You"	6
US Rhythmic Airplay (Billboard)	20
US Top 100 Pop Singles (Cash Box)	20

=== Year-end charts ===
Year-end chart performance for "How Many Ways"
Chart (1995)	Position
US Hot R&B/Hip-Hop Songs (Billboard) with "I Belong to You"	47
