= R. Kelly (album) =

Studio album by R. Kelly
- Released: November 14, 1995
- Recorded: March–July 1995
- Length: 62:47
- Labels: Jive; Zomba
- Producer: R. Kelly

R. Kelly chronology
12 Play (1993)	R. Kelly (1995)	R. (1998)

Singles from R. Kelly
- 1. "You Remind Me of Something" Released: October 27, 1995; 2. "Down Low (Nobody Has to Know)" Released: December 11, 1995; 3. "Thank God It's Friday" Released: January 6, 1996; 4. "I Can't Sleep Baby (If I)" Released: June 21, 1996

R. Kelly is the eponymously titled second studio album by American R&B singer-songwriter R. Kelly. It was released on November 14, 1995, by Jive Records. The production was handled entirely by Kelly himself. It spawned three number one R&B singles: "You Remind Me of Something", "Down Low (Nobody Has to Know)" and "I Can't Sleep Baby (If I)".

== Critical reception ==
Professional ratings
Review scores
Source	Rating
AllMusic	4/5 stars
Robert Christgau	A−
Entertainment Weekly	A−
The Guardian	3/5 stars
Muzik	3/5 stars
Q	4/5 stars
The Rolling Stone Album Guide	4/5 stars
USA Today	3/4 stars

R. Kelly received mostly positive reviews from music critics. Callum Jones of Rolling Stone wrote, Kelly "has grown out of his unthinking misogyny to the point where he makes a plea in 'As I Look Into My Life' to 'brothers in the ghetto' to 'love and respect that woman and bring her happiness.' Make love not war is an old message, but Kelly delivers it with sincerity. By spreading it in the hood in these violent times, he believes he's doing God's work, and who's to say he is wrong? Predecessors like Marvin Gaye and Prince have shown that great sex is spiritual, and Kelly's make-out music ranks with the best." Yahoo! Music critic Jim DeRogatis, who would later go on to be the most prominent journalist to report on Kelly's various crimes, found that with R. Kelly "Kelly shows that he can balance the sacred and the profane more effectively than anyone since Prince."

Entertainment Weekly editor Ken Tucker noted that "where his last collection, the hugely successful 12 Play, was shot through with raunch and roll, Kelly is now infatuated with, as one song title has it, "Tempo Slow" [...] There are times when Kelly confuses sincerity with dolorousness, but for the most part, he's pulled it off: An album that moves him into a new realm of pop ambitiousness." Cash Box felt that R. Kelly showcases the singer's "considerable artistic growth as he explores the various textures of R&B music. The seamless way in which Kelly incorporates elements of vintage soul, gospel, and even the blues with his music, adds greatly to his credbility [sic] as an artist [...] Radio has been in love with Kelly since his first release and no doubt this will only further the attraction. This is a solid album that will position the artist to be a major and versatile force in R&B/Pop well into the foreseeable future."

=== Accolades ===
In August 1996 at the MTV Video Music Awards, "Down Low (Nobody Has to Know)" was nominated for Best Male Video.

== Commercial performance ==
R. Kelly debuted at number one on the US Billboard 200. It was Kelly's first album to reach the top of the chart as well as his second album to peak at number one on the US Top R&B/Hip-Hop Albums chart. On January 17, 1996, the album was cerified 2× Platinum by the Recording Industry Association of America (RIAA). The following year, it was certified 4× Platinum. By September 1998, R. Kelly had sold 2.8 million copies domestically. On June 22, 1999, it reached 5× Platinum status for shipments figures in excess of 5.0 million units.

== Track listing ==
All songs written, produced, and arranged by R. Kelly.

R. Kelly track listing
No.	Title	Length
1.	"The Sermon"	3:23
2.	"Hump Bounce"	4:06
3.	"Not Gonna Hold On"	4:04
4.	"You Remind Me of Something"	4:09
5.	"Step in My Room"	3:48
6.	"Baby, Baby, Baby, Baby, Baby..."	4:19
7.	"(You to Be) Be Happy" (featuring The Notorious B.I.G.)	4:36
8.	"Down Low (Nobody Has to Know)" (featuring The Isley Brothers)	4:48
9.	"I Can't Sleep Baby (If I)"	5:31
10.	"Thank God It's Friday"	3:53
11.	"Love Is On the Way"	3:01
12.	"Heaven If You Hear Me"	0:58
13.	"Religious Love"	4:11
14.	"Tempo Slow"	4:10
15.	"As I Look into My Life"	1:30
16.	"Trade in My Life"	6:20
Total length:		62:47

== Personnel ==
Credits adapted from AllMusic.

- Ray Bady – vocals (background)
- Chris Brickley – engineer
- Lafayette Carthon – keyboards
- Kirk Franklin – choir director, guest artist
- Stephen George – engineer, mixing, programming
- Bernie Grundman – mastering
- Barry Hankerson – executive producer
- Charlotte Horton – vocals (background)
- Ernie Isley – guest artist, guitar, performer, primary artist
- Ronald Isley – guest artist, performer, primary artist, vocals (background)
- R. Kelly – composer, keyboards, mixing, multi instruments, primary artist, producer, vocals, vocals (background)
- Mr. Lee – guest artist, mixing, multi instruments, programming
- Peter Mokran – engineer, keyboards, mixing, programming
- The Notorious B.I.G. – guest artist, primary artist, rap
- Jim Slattery – multi instruments
- Marinna Teal (Strings) – vocals (background)
- Mario Winans – programming

== Charts ==
=== Weekly charts ===
Weekly chart performance for R. Kelly
Chart (1995–96)	Peak position
Australian Albums (ARIA)	63
Dutch Albums (Album Top 100)	26
German Albums (Offizielle Top 100)	69
New Zealand Albums (RMNZ)	30
Swedish Albums (Sverigetopplistan)	32
UK Albums (Official Charts)	18
US Billboard 200	1
US Top R&B/Hip-Hop Albums (Billboard)	1

=== Year-end charts ===
Year-end chart performance for R. Kelly
Chart (1996)	Position
Dutch Albums (Album Top 100)	98
US Billboard 200	17
US Top R&B/Hip-Hop Albums (Billboard)	4

== Certifications ==
Certifications for R. Kelly
Region	Certification	Certified units/sales
Canada (Music Canada)	Gold	50,000^{^}
Netherlands (NVPI)	Gold	50,000^{^}
United Kingdom (BPI)	Gold	100,000^{^}
United States (RIAA)	5× Platinum	5,000,000^{^}
^{^} Shipments figures based on certification alone.

== See also ==
- List of number-one albums of 1995 (U.S.)
- List of number-one R&B albums of 1995 (U.S.)
