= Come with Me (Keith Sweat song) =

1996 song by Keith Sweat featuring Ron Isley

Single by Keith Sweat featuring Ron Isley

from the album Keith Sweat
- Released: 1997
- Recorded: 1996
- Length: 3:56
- Label: Elektra
- Songwriters: Keith Sweat; Fitzgerald Scott; Craig Love
- Producer: Scott

Keith Sweat singles chronology
| "Just a Touch" (1997) | "Come with Me" (1997) | "Come and Get with Me" (1997) |

Ron Isley singles chronology
| "Come with Me" (1997) | "Smokin' Me Out" (1997) |

"Come with Me" is a song by American singer Keith Sweat and the fourth and final single from his fifth album Keith Sweat (1996). It features American singer Ron Isley.

== Critical reception ==
Leo Stanley of AllMusic cited the song to be one of the "excellent selections" from Keith Sweat and described it as "seductive".

== Charts ==
| Chart (1997) | Peak position |
|---|---|
| US Billboard Hot 100 | 68 |
| US Hot R&B/Hip-Hop Songs (Billboard) | 27 |
