= Thank God It's Friday (R. Kelly song) =

Single by R. Kelly

from the album R. Kelly
- Released: 1996
- Recorded: 1995
- Genre: R&B; funk
- Length: 3:53
- Label: Jive
- Songwriter: Robert Kelly
- Producer: R. Kelly

R. Kelly singles chronology
"Down Low (Nobody Has to Know)" (1995)	"Thank God It's Friday" (1996)	"I Can't Sleep Baby (If I)" (1996)

"Thank God It's Friday" is a song written, produced and performed by American R&B musician R. Kelly. It was released in January 1996 by Jive Records as the third single from his eponymously titled second studio album, R. Kelly (1995). The song entered the UK charts at number 14. The accompanying music video was directed by Hype Williams.

== Critical reception ==
A reviewer from Music Week gave the song a score of three out of five, adding, "Smooth soul groove from the king of swing. Not a smash, but sparkling stuff all the same." Jordan Paramor from Smash Hits gave it two out of five.

== Charts ==
Chart performance for "Thank God It's Friday"
Chart (1996)	Peak position
Australia (ARIA)	60
Europe (Eurochart Hot 100)	58
Europe (European Dance Radio)	22
New Zealand (Recorded Music NZ)	33
Scotland Singles (Official Charts)	45
UK Singles (Official Charts)	14
UK Hip Hop/R&B (Official Charts)	3
