= I Belong to You (Toni Braxton song) =

- US CD edition

Single by Toni Braxton

from the album Toni Braxton
- B-side: "How Many Ways"
- Released: June 10, 1994
- Studio: Oasis Studios (North Hollywood, California)
- Length: 3:54
- Label: LaFace
- Songwriters: Vassal Benford; Ronald Spearman
- Producer: Vassal Benford

Toni Braxton singles chronology
"You Mean the World to Me" (1994)	"I Belong to You" / "How Many Ways" (1994)	"You're Makin' Me High" / "Let It Flow" (1996)

"I Belong to You" is a song by American singer Toni Braxton. It was written by Vassal Benford and Ronald Spearman for her eponymous debut studio album (1993), while production was helmed by the former. The song was released as the album's fifth and final single on June 10, 1994 by LaFace and Arista Records, a double A side along with "How Many Ways." While there was no accompanying music video for "I Belong to You", the song garnered Braxton a nomination for Best Female R&B Vocal Performance at the 1996 Grammy Awards. It peaked at number 28 on the Billboard Hot 100 on January 21, 1995.

== Track listings ==
- US double A-side CD/cassette single
1. "I Belong to You" (Rollerskate Radio Mix) – 4:21
2. "I Belong to You" (Soulpower Mix w/o Rap) – 5:41
3. "I Belong to You" (Album Version) – 3:53
4. "How Many Ways" (R. Kelly Remix Extended - No Talk) – 5:46
5. "How Many Ways" (Album Version) – 4:45
6. "How Many Ways" (The VH1 Mix) – 4:17
- US 12-inch maxi single ("How Many Ways/I Belong to You")
1. "How Many Ways" (R. Kelly Remix, Extended w/ Rap) – 5:46
2. "How Many Ways" (Bad Boy Remix, Extended Mix) – 7:02
3. "How Many Ways" (Bad Boy Instrumental) – 6:53
4. "I Belong to You" (Rollerskate Radio Mix) – 4:21
5. "I Belong to You" (Soulpower Mix w/o Rap) – 5:41
6. "I Belong to You" (Soulpower Instrumental) – 5:57
- US promotional CD single ("I Belong to You")
1. "I Belong to You" (Rollerskate Radio Mix) – 4:21
2. "I Belong to You" (Soulpower Mix W/O Rap) – 5:41
3. "I Belong to You" (Album Version) – 3:53
4. "The Christmas Song" – 3:25

== Credits and personnel ==
Credits lifted from Toni Braxton's liner notes.

- Vassal Benford – production, writing
- Toni Braxton – vocals
- Valerie Davis – backing vocals
- Victor Flores – mixing, recording
- Chris Gehringer – mastering
- Ronald Spearman – writing

== Charts ==
=== Weekly charts ===
Weekly chart performance for "I Belong to You"
Chart (1995)	Peak position
Canada Top Singles (RPM)	80
Iceland (Íslenski Listinn Topp 40)	31
US Billboard Hot 100 with "How Many Ways"	28
US Dance Singles Sales (Billboard) with "How Many Ways"	8
US Hot R&B/Hip-Hop Songs (Billboard) with "How Many Ways"	6
US Pop Airplay (Billboard)	32
US Rhythmic Airplay (Billboard)	18
US Top 100 Pop Singles (Cash Box)	20

=== Year-end charts ===
Year-end chart performance for "I Belong to You"
Chart (1995)	Position
US Hot R&B Singles (Billboard) with "How Many Ways"	47
