= The Final Tic =

Studio album by Crucial Conflict
- Released: July 2, 1996
- Studios: The Barn (Chicago, Illinois)
- Genres: Hip hop; gangsta rap
- Length: 54:21
- Labels: Pallas; Universal
- Producers: Shorty Capone; Roy Cormier; Fab 5 Freddy; Wildstyle

Crucial Conflict chronology
Crucial Times (1993)	The Final Tic (1996)	Good Side, Bad Side (1998)

Singles from The Final Tic
- 1. "Hay" Released: April 23, 1996; 2. "Ride the Rodeo" Released: 1996; 3. "Showdown" Released: 1996

Professional ratings
Review scores
Source	Rating
AllMusic	4.5/5 stars
Entertainment Weekly	B
Muzik	2.5/5 stars
The Source	3.5/5 stars

The Final Tic is the debut full-length album by American hip hop group Crucial Conflict from Chicago, Illinois. It was released on July 2, 1996, through Pallas Records and Universal Records, and was entirely produced by member Ralph "Wildstyle" Leverston. The album was a success due in large part to the group's breakthrough single "Hay", peaking at number 18 on the Billboard Hot 100 singles chart. The album itself also found success in the United States charts, peaking at number 12 on the Billboard 200 albums chart and at number 5 on the Top R&B/Hip-Hop Albums chart. "Hay" was certified gold on July 19, 1996, and The Final Tic was also certified gold on September 4, 1996, by the Recording Industry Association of America. In January 1997, The Final Tic received a Platinum certification by the RIAA.

== Track listing ==
All music is composed by Ralph "Wildstyle" Leverston.

No.	Title	Length
1.	"Intro - Don't Let It"	1:37
2.	"Final Tic"	4:05
3.	"Showdown"	4:25
4.	"Desperado"	4:39
5.	"Life Ain't the Same" (featuring QBall)	3:50
6.	"Hay"	4:20
7.	"Trigger Happy" (featuring Sheena Lee)	1:50
8.	"1-900-Off-Your Square"	0:39
9.	"Lil Advice"	4:03
10.	"Tell It to the Judge" (featuring QBall)	4:41
11.	"Ride the Rodeo" (featuring Toi)	3:17
12.	"To the Left"	4:17
13.	"Just Getting My Money" (featuring Tasha Keller)	3:58
14.	"Get Up"	4:20
15.	"Hay (Remix)" (featuring T-Babe & Toi)	4:20
Total length:		54:21

== Personnel ==
Crucial Conflict

- Corey "Coldhard" Johnson – main artist, vocals
- Wondosas "Kilo" Martin – main artist, vocals
- Marrico "Never" King – main artist, vocals
- Ralph "Wildstyle" Leverston – main artist, producer, engineering (tracks: 1–12, 14–15)

Additional vocalists

- QBall – vocals (tracks: 5, 10)
- LaTaunya "Toy" Bounds – vocals (tracks: 11, 15)
- Sheena Lee – vocals (track 7)
- Tasha Keller – vocals (track 13)
- T-Babe – vocals (track 15)

Technical

- Ernie Allen – engineering (track 13)
- Stan Wallace – mixing (tracks: 1, 6)
- Chris Shepherd – mixing (tracks: 2, 5, 7, 9, 10, 12)
- Jeff Lane – mixing (tracks: 2, 9)
- Tom Carlyle – mixing (tracks: 3, 4, 11, 13–15)
- Ron Lowe – mixing (tracks: 3, 4, 11, 13–15)
- Dennis Ferrante – mastering
- Fred Brathwaite – executive producer
- Roy "Black Prince" Cormier – executive producer
- Shorty Capone – executive producer
- Miguel Rivera – design
- Daniel Hastings – photography

== Charts ==
=== Weekly charts ===
Chart (1996)	Peak position
US Billboard 200	12
US Top R&B/Hip-Hop Albums (Billboard)	5

=== Year-end charts ===
Chart (1996)	Position
US Billboard 200	160
US Top R&B/Hip-Hop Albums (Billboard)	44

== Certifications ==
Region	Certification	Certified units/sales
United States (RIAA)	Gold	500,000^{^}
^{^} Shipments figures based on certification alone.
