= Leflaur Leflah Eshkoshka =

Single by The Fab 5

from the album Nocturnal
- B-side: "Letha Brainz Blo"
- Released: October 31st 1995
- Studio: D&D Studios (New York, NY)
- Genre: Hip hop
- Label: Priority
- Songwriters: Jack McNair; Jahmal Bush; Dashawn Jamal Yates; Sean Price; Barret Powell; Paul Hendricks
- Producer: Baby Paul

The Fab 5 singles chronology
"Blah / Leflah" (1995)	"Leflaur Leflah Eshkoshka" (1995)

Heltah Skeltah singles chronology
"Blah / Leflah" (1995)	"Leflaur Leflah Eshkoshka" (1995)	"Operation Lockdown" (1996)

Originoo Gunn Clappaz singles chronology
"Blah / Leflah" (1995)	"Leflaur Leflah Eshkoshka" (1995)	"No Fear" (1996)

Music video
- "Leflaur Leflah Eshkoshka" on YouTube

"Leflaur Leflah Eshkoshka" is a song by American hip hop group The Fab 5. It was released in 1995 via Duck Down/Priority Records as the lead single from Heltah Skeltah's debut studio album, Nocturnal(1996). Recording sessions took place at D&D Studios in New York City. Production was handled by Baby Paul with executive producers Buckshot and Drew "Dru-Ha" Friedman. The song contains a sample from The Catalyst's "Uzuri". It peaked at numbers 69 and 75 on the US Cash Box Top 100 and Billboard Hot 100 charts. The accompanying music video was directed by Marcus Turner.

== Track listing ==
12"
No.	Title	Writer(s)	Producer(s)	Length
1.	"Leflaur Leflah Eshkoshka (Part 2 - Radio)"	Jack McNair; Jahmal Bush; Dashawn Jamal Yates; Sean Price; Barret Powell; Paul Hendricks	Baby Paul
2.	"Leflaur Leflah Eshkoshka (Remix - Radio)"	McNair; Bush; Yates; Price; Powell; Hendricks	Baby Paul
3.	"Leflaur Leflah Eshkoshka (Remix Instrumental)"	McNair; Bush; Yates; Price; Powell; Hendricks	Baby Paul
4.	"Letha Brainz Blo (Radio)"	Bush; Price; Hendricks	Baby Paul
5.	"Letha Brainz Blo (Xplicit)"	Bush; Price; Hendricks	Baby Paul
6.	"Letha Brainz Blo (Instrumental)"	Bush; Price; Hendricks	Baby Paul

== Personnel ==
"Leflaur Leflah Eshkoshka"

- Jack McNair – main artist, vocals
- Jahmal Bush – main artist, vocals
- Dashawn Jamal Yates – main artist, vocals
- Sean Price – main artist, vocals
- Barret Powell – main artist, vocals
- Paul Hendricks – producer
- John Wydrycs – engineering
- Dexter Thibou – assistant engineering

"Letha Brainz Blo"

- Jahmal Bush – main artist, vocals
- Sean Price – main artist, vocals
- Paul Hendricks – producer
- Akshun – engineering

== Charts ==
Chart (1996)	Peak position
US Billboard Hot 100	75
US Hot Rap Singles (Billboard)	9
US Hot R&B Singles (Billboard)	60
US Cash Box Top 100	69
