= Roy Cormier =

Roy Cormier is an American record producer, talent manager, and entrepreneur.

== Career ==
Born in Brooklyn, New York, Cormier began promoting local parties and concerts in the early 1980s featuring artists like The Fearless Four, Run DMC and Whodini. He gained the attention of music mogul Russell Simmons who invited Cormier to be part of his newly formed management company, Rush Communications.

=== Rush Communications ===
Along with LL Cool J, Fresh Prince a.k.a. Will Smith & DJ Jazzy Jeff, Beastie Boys, and Public Enemy, Cormier worked closely with group Whodini, the first rap group to go platinum and to tour Europe extensively, as their road manager. Cormier worked group Mauricio Black Mad from Brazil.

=== Beastie Boys ===
Cormier received notoriety from the Beastie Boys on two different songs from two different albums. The first being on their 1995 EP "Aglio e Olio", in the track "I Can't Think Straight" via the rambling :

"Uh Good Evening ladies, my name is Roy Cormier, I like it smooth actually.
I mean a lot of fellows, they like it raw, personally I prefer smooth.
Um, you know, like the coconut lotion.
I'm talkin' I run a lot of productions
Company productions, keepin' it on the smooth generally.
All the regular and uh, you know, with the coconut lotion and all, it's lovely.
It's uh, you know, nothin' but love for you baby."

Then, three years later Cormier was again mentioned when Beastie Boys featured his name in their hit single "Body Movin'" off their 1998 Grammy Award winning album Hello Nasty with the lyrics, "Puttin' bodies in motion 'cause I got the notion / Like Roy Cormier with the coconut lotion".

=== Pallas Records ===
As the former Co-President of the independent label, Pallas Records, Cormier helped launch the influential rap group Crucial Conflict with his friend and associate, Fab 5 Freddy. Cormier has gone on to sell over one million records with Crucial Conflict.
