= Planet Crucon =

Studio album by Crucial Conflict
- Released: January 15, 2008
- Genre: Hip hop; gangsta rap
- Length: 1:14:43
- Label: Buckwild Records
- Producer: Wildstyle

Crucial Conflict chronology
Good Side Bad Side (1998)	Planet Crucon (2008)

Planet Crucon is the third full-length album by American hip hop group Crucial Conflict from Chicago, Illinois. It was released on January 15, 2008 through Buckwild Records. It is the group's first studio album in ten years, their last being 1998's Good Side Bad Side. It features guest appearances from George Clinton, Kendra Foster, Sonny Cool and Teddy Kane. The album peaked at number 73 on the Billboard Top R&B/Hip-Hop Albums chart.

== Track listing ==
No.	Title	Length
1.	"Planet Crucon"	3:51
2.	"They What?"	4:28
3.	"Wangin'"	4:05
4.	"City Streets"	4:10
5.	"Hood Wit It"	4:14
6.	"Guess I'm a Pimp"	4:08
7.	"Walk in My Shoes"	4:07
8.	"By the Time" (featuring George Clinton & Kendra Foster)	4:34
9.	"Change"	3:53
10.	"Oow, Oow, Oow"	3:45
11.	"Welcome to My World" (featuring Sonny Cool)	4:34
12.	"Feelin' Crucial"	3:51
13.	"We Ain't Studen"	4:17
14.	"Jump Down"	4:33
15.	"Ride Out Dip"	3:50
16.	"Let Me Know"	3:45
17.	"In the Circle" (featuring Teddy Kane)	4:32
18.	"I Done Been"	4:06
Total length:		1:14:43

== Personnel ==
Crucial Conflict

- Corey "Coldhard" Johnson – main artist, vocals
- Wondosas "Kilo" Martin – main artist, vocals
- Marrico "Never" King – main artist, vocals
- Ralph "Wildstyle" Leverston – main artist, vocals, executive producer

Additional vocalists

- George Edward Clinton – vocals (track 8)
- Kendra Foster – vocals (track 8)
- Sonny Cool – vocals (track 11)
- Teddy Kane – vocals (track 17)

Technical

- C. Paul Johnson – engineering
- Matt Hennessy – mixing
- Alex Gross – mixing (track 10)
- Krassi Kurtev – associate executive producer
- Parrish Lewis – photography

== Chart history ==
Chart (2008)	Peak position
US Top R&B/Hip-Hop Albums (Billboard)	73
