= Good Side, Bad Side (Crucial Conflict album) =

Good Side Bad Side

Studio album by Crucial Conflict
- Released: November 3, 1998
- Studios: The Barn (Chicago); CRC (Chicago); Neighborhood Watch (Chicago)
- Genres: Hip hop; gangsta rap
- Labels: Pallas Records; Raw Dope Productions; Universal
- Producers: Shorty Capone (exec.); Roy Cormier (exec.); Fab 5 Freddy (exec.); Torino Norris (exec.); Wildstyle; R. Kelly

Crucial Conflict chronology
The Final Tic (1996)	Good Side Bad Side (1998)	Planet Crucon (2008)

Singles from Good Side Bad Side
- 1. "Scummy" Released: 1998

Professional ratings
Review scores
Source	Rating
AllMusic	2/5 stars
The Source	3.5/5 stars

Good Side Bad Side is the second album by the Chicago hip hop group Crucial Conflict. It was released on November 3, 1998, through Pallas Records, Raw Dope Productions and Universal Records. Recording sessions took place at the Barn, Chicago Recording Company and Neighbourhood Watch Studios in Chicago. It features a couple of diss tracks towards Bone Thugs-N-Harmony, and guest appearances from Tear Da Club Up Thugs, Do Or Die and R. Kelly.

The album peaked at number 38 on the Billboard 200 albums chart and at number 10 on the Top R&B/Hip-Hop Albums chart in the United States.

== Critical reception ==
The Chicago Tribune thought that "producer-rapper Wild Style's mesmerizing musical compositions may be the group's strongest asset ... Dubbed the 'Rodeo' style, the work of the Windy City beatsmith contains insistent keyboard, twangy guitar and dynamic drum patterns that explode from the speakers." The Chicago Reader wrote that "the relentlessly hysterical, nasal speed-rapping turns the 75-minute CD into a suffocating sonic beatdown."

== Track listing ==
No.	Title	Length
1.	"Intro"	2:00
2.	"The Bidness"	4:09
3.	"Scummy"	4:28
4.	"Roll Somethin"	4:18
5.	"2 Bogus" (featuring Tear Da Club Up Thugs)	4:18
6.	"Let It Go"	3:40
7.	"Like This"	4:23
8.	"Young Guns"	4:53
9.	"Universal Love"	4:11
10.	"Faceless Ones"	3:58
11.	"Swing It over Here"	4:17
12.	"Airplane" (featuring Do Or Die)	4:51
13.	"Pump It Up"	3:34
14.	"Back Against the Wall (Bone Thugs Diss)"	5:20
15.	"Come On"	3:40
16.	"I'm Bout to Explode"	5:02
17.	"Ghetto Queen" (featuring R. Kelly)	4:19
18.	"Raw Dope Anthem"	4:24

== Personnel ==
Crucial Conflict

- Corey "Coldhard" Johnson – main artist, vocals
- Wondosas "Kilo" Martin – main artist, vocals
- Marrico "Never" King – main artist, vocals
- Ralph "Wildstyle" Leverston – main artist, producer (tracks: 1–16, 18), mixing (tracks: 1–12, 14–18), engineering (tracks: 6, 12), assistant engineering (track 14), mastering (tracks: 1–4, 6–11, 13, 15–18)

Additional vocalists

- Paul Duane Beauregard – vocals (track 5)
- Jordan Michael Houston – vocals (track 5)
- Ricky Dunigan – vocals (track 5)
- Darnell Smith – vocals (track 12)
- Dennis Round – vocals (track 12)
- Anthony Round – vocals (track 12)
- Robert Sylvester Kelly – vocals & producer (track 17)
- T-Babe – vocals (tracks: 1, 7, 9, 13)
- Clyde – vocals (track 1)
- PMP – vocals (track 15)
- BHlunt – vocals (track 16)

Technical

- QBall – scratches (track 4), mixing (tracks: 1, 2, 4, 6–10, 14–16, 18), assistant engineering (track 6)
- Frankie – guitar (track 11)
- Chris Steinmetz – engineering (tracks: 1, 7–9, 11, 15–18)
- Tom Carlyle – engineering (tracks: 2, 4, 10)
- Jeff Lang – engineering (tracks: 3, 5, 12–14)
- Fred Hahn – assistant engineering (tracks: 1, 2, 4, 7, 8, 10, 15–18)
- Bill Douglass – assistant engineering (tracks: 5, 12–14)
- Jason B. – assistant engineering (tracks: 9, 11)
- Matt Judah – assistant engineering (tracks: 17, 18)
- Blake C – assistant engineering (track 9)
- Dennis Ferrante – mastering (tracks: 1–4, 6–11, 13, 15–18)
- Sean Sutton – mastering (tracks: 5, 12, 14)
- Fred Brathwaite – executive producer, art direction
- Roy "Black Prince" Cormier – executive producer
- Torino "Neno Blade" Norris – executive producer
- Shorty Capone – executive producer
- Eric Russ – art direction
- Daniel Hastings – photography

== Chart history ==
Chart (1998)	Peak position
US Billboard 200	38
US Top R&B/Hip-Hop Albums (Billboard)	10
