= List of Billboard Hot 100 number ones of 1996 =

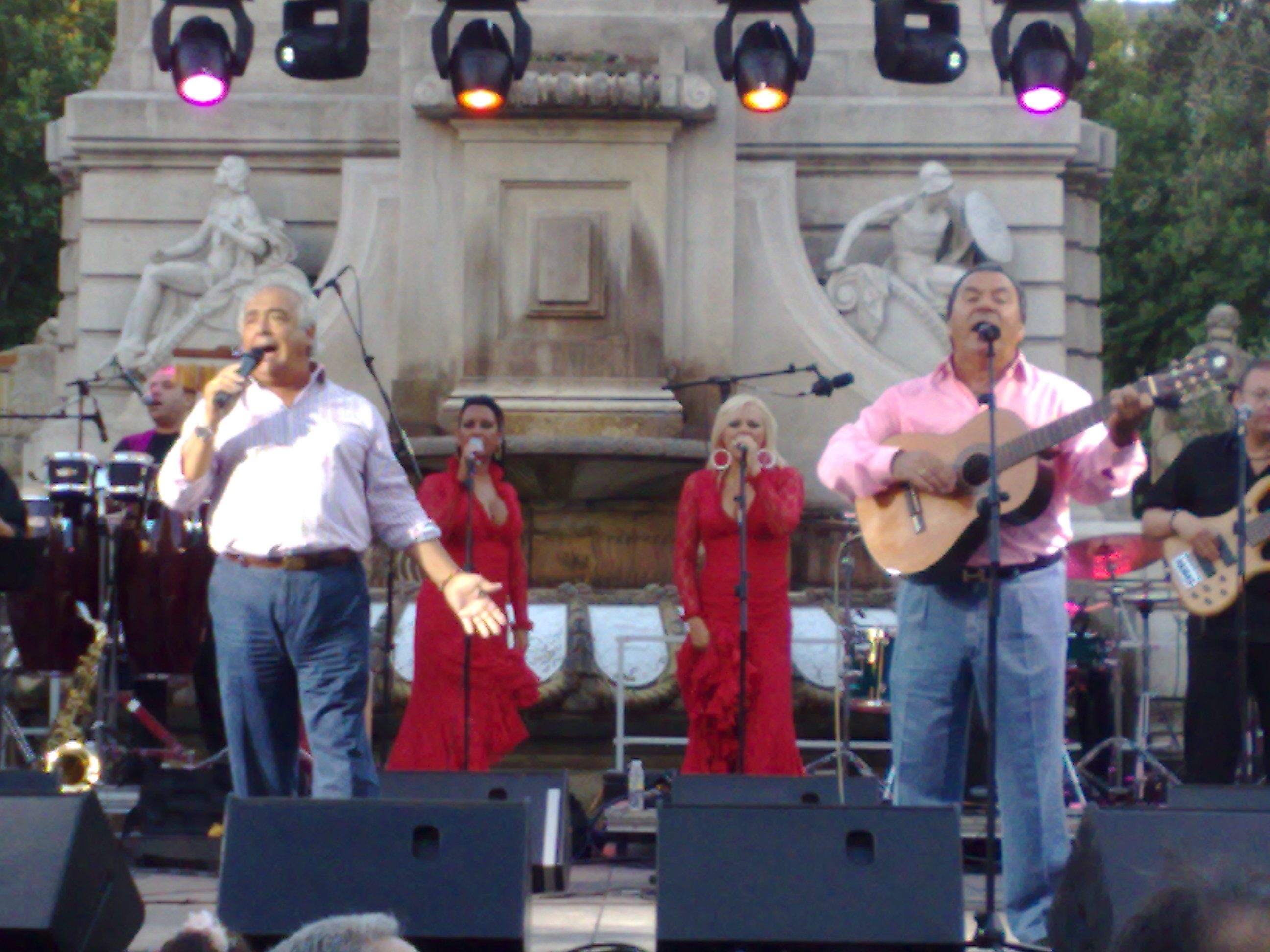
Los del Río (pictured) earned their first Hot 100 number-one single with "Macarena", which stayed at the top position for fourteen straight weeks.

The Billboard Hot 100 is a chart that ranks the best-performing singles of the United States. Published by Billboard magazine, the data are compiled by Nielsen SoundScan based collectively on each single's weekly physical sales and airplays. The year started out with "One Sweet Day" by Mariah Carey and Boyz II Men and ended with "Un-Break My Heart" by Toni Braxton. There were nine singles that peaked atop the charts, but if "One Sweet Day" is excluded from the count (as the song had its peak in the previous year), the total would be eight, the second lowest for a single year, along with 2005 and 2015. The longest running number-one single of 1996 is "Macarena" (Bayside Boys Mix), which stayed at the top for 14 weeks.

That year, 8 acts earned their first number one song, such as Bone Thugs-n-Harmony, 2Pac, K-Ci & JoJo, Dr. Dre, Roger Troutman, Toni Braxton, Los del Río, and Blackstreet. Mariah Carey, Dr. Dre and Toni Braxton were the only acts to hit number one more than once, with each of them hitting number one twice.

== Chart history ==
Key
The yellow background indicates the #1 song on Billboard's 1996 Year-End Chart of Pop Singles.

No.	Issue date	Song	Artist(s)	Ref.
804	January 6	"One Sweet Day"	Mariah Carey and Boyz II Men	
804	January 13	"One Sweet Day"	Mariah Carey and Boyz II Men	
804	January 20	"One Sweet Day"	Mariah Carey and Boyz II Men	
804	January 27	"One Sweet Day"	Mariah Carey and Boyz II Men	
804	February 3	"One Sweet Day"	Mariah Carey and Boyz II Men	
804	February 10	"One Sweet Day"	Mariah Carey and Boyz II Men	
804	February 17	"One Sweet Day"	Mariah Carey and Boyz II Men	
804	February 24	"One Sweet Day"	Mariah Carey and Boyz II Men	
804	March 2	"One Sweet Day"	Mariah Carey and Boyz II Men	
804	March 9	"One Sweet Day"	Mariah Carey and Boyz II Men	
804	March 16	"One Sweet Day"	Mariah Carey and Boyz II Men	
805	March 23	"Because You Loved Me"	Céline Dion	
805	March 30	"Because You Loved Me"	Céline Dion	
805	April 6	"Because You Loved Me"	Céline Dion	
805	April 13	"Because You Loved Me"	Céline Dion	
805	April 20	"Because You Loved Me"	Céline Dion	
805	April 27	"Because You Loved Me"	Céline Dion	
806	May 4	"Always Be My Baby"	Mariah Carey	
806	May 11	"Always Be My Baby"	Mariah Carey	
807	May 18	"Tha Crossroads"	Bone Thugs-n-Harmony	
807	May 25	"Tha Crossroads"	Bone Thugs-n-Harmony	
807	June 1	"Tha Crossroads"	Bone Thugs-n-Harmony	
807	June 8	"Tha Crossroads"	Bone Thugs-n-Harmony	
807	June 15	"Tha Crossroads"	Bone Thugs-n-Harmony	
807	June 22	"Tha Crossroads"	Bone Thugs-n-Harmony	
807	June 29	"Tha Crossroads"	Bone Thugs-n-Harmony	
807	July 6	"Tha Crossroads"	Bone Thugs-n-Harmony	
808	July 13	"How Do U Want It" / "California Love"	2Pac featuring K-Ci & JoJo / featuring Dr. Dre and Roger Troutman	
808	July 20	"How Do U Want It" / "California Love"	2Pac featuring K-Ci & JoJo / featuring Dr. Dre and Roger Troutman	
809	July 27	"You're Makin' Me High" / "Let It Flow"	Toni Braxton	
810	August 3	"Macarena" (Bayside Boys Mix)	Los del Río	
810	August 10	"Macarena" (Bayside Boys Mix)	Los del Río	
810	August 17	"Macarena" (Bayside Boys Mix)	Los del Río	
810	August 24	"Macarena" (Bayside Boys Mix)	Los del Río	
810	August 31	"Macarena" (Bayside Boys Mix)	Los del Río	
810	September 7	"Macarena" (Bayside Boys Mix)	Los del Río	
810	September 14	"Macarena" (Bayside Boys Mix)	Los del Río	
810	September 21	"Macarena" (Bayside Boys Mix)	Los del Río	
810	September 28	"Macarena" (Bayside Boys Mix)	Los del Río	
810	October 5	"Macarena" (Bayside Boys Mix)	Los del Río	
810	October 12	"Macarena" (Bayside Boys Mix)	Los del Río	
810	October 19	"Macarena" (Bayside Boys Mix)	Los del Río	
810	October 26	"Macarena" (Bayside Boys Mix)	Los del Río	
810	November 2	"Macarena" (Bayside Boys Mix)	Los del Río	
811	November 9	"No Diggity"	Blackstreet featuring Dr. Dre	
811	November 16	"No Diggity"	Blackstreet featuring Dr. Dre	
811	November 23	"No Diggity"	Blackstreet featuring Dr. Dre	
811	November 30	"No Diggity"	Blackstreet featuring Dr. Dre	
812	December 7	"Un-Break My Heart"	Toni Braxton	
812	December 14	"Un-Break My Heart"	Toni Braxton	
812	December 21	"Un-Break My Heart"	Toni Braxton	
812	December 28	"Un-Break My Heart"	Toni Braxton	

== Number-one artists ==
List of number-one artists by total weeks at number one
Position	Artist	Weeks at No. 1
1	Los Del Rio	14
2	Mariah Carey	13
3	Boyz II Men	11
4	Bone Thugs-n-Harmony	8
5	Céline Dion	6
5	Dr. Dre	6
7	Toni Braxton	5
8	Blackstreet	4
9	2Pac	2
9	K-Ci & JoJo	2
9	Roger Troutman	2

== See also ==
- 1996 in music
- List of Billboard number-one singles
- List of Billboard Hot 100 number-one singles of the 1990s

== Additional sources ==
- Fred Bronson's Billboard Book of Number 1 Hits, 5th Edition (ISBN 0-8230-7677-6)
- Joel Whitburn's Top Pop Singles 1955-2008, 12 Edition (ISBN 0-89820-180-2)
- Joel Whitburn Presents the Billboard Hot 100 Charts: The Nineties (ISBN 0-89820-137-3)
- Additional information obtained can be verified within Billboard's online archive services and print editions of the magazine.
