= List of Billboard number-one R&B albums of 1996 =

These are the Billboard magazine R&B albums that have reached number-one in 1996.

== Chart history ==
Issue date	Album	Artist
January 6	Waiting to Exhale	Soundtrack / Various artists
January 13	Waiting to Exhale	Soundtrack / Various artists
January 20	Waiting to Exhale	Soundtrack / Various artists
January 27	Waiting to Exhale	Soundtrack / Various artists
February 3	Waiting to Exhale	Soundtrack / Various artists
February 10	Str8 off tha Streetz of Muthaphukkin Compton	Eazy-E
February 17	Str8 off tha Streetz of Muthaphukkin Compton	Eazy-E
February 24	All Eyez on Me	2Pac
March 2	All Eyez on Me	2Pac
March 9	All Eyez on Me	2Pac
March 16	All Eyez on Me	2Pac
March 23	All Eyez on Me	2Pac
March 30	All Eyez on Me	2Pac
April 6	All Eyez on Me	2Pac
April 13	The Coming	Busta Rhymes
April 20	The Resurrection	Geto Boys
April 27	The Score	Fugees
May 4	The Score	Fugees
May 11	Sunset Park	Soundtrack / Various artists
May 18	The Score	Fugees
May 25	The Score	Fugees
June 1	The Score	Fugees
June 8	Gettin' It (Album Number Ten)	Too Short
June 15	Gettin' It (Album Number Ten)	Too Short
June 22	All Eyez on Me	2Pac
June 29	All Eyez on Me	2Pac
July 6	Secrets	Toni Braxton
July 13	All Eyez on Me	2Pac
July 20	It Was Written	Nas
July 27	It Was Written	Nas
August 3	It Was Written	Nas
August 10	It Was Written	Nas
August 17	Beats, Rhymes and Life	A Tribe Called Quest
August 24	It Was Written	Nas
August 31	It Was Written	Nas
September 7	It Was Written	Nas
September 14	ATLiens	Outkast
September 21	ATLiens	Outkast
September 28	Home Again	New Edition
October 5	Another Level	Blackstreet
October 12	Another Level	Blackstreet
October 19	Another Level	Blackstreet
October 26	Another Level	Blackstreet
November 2	Another Level	Blackstreet
November 9	Bow Down	Westside Connection
November 16	Hell On Earth	Mobb Deep
November 23	Tha Doggfather	Snoop Dogg
November 30	The Don Killuminati: The 7 Day Theory	Makaveli
December 7	The Don Killuminati: The 7 Day Theory	Makaveli
December 14	The Don Killuminati: The 7 Day Theory	Makaveli
December 21	Muddy Waters	Redman
December 28	The Don Killuminati: The 7 Day Theory	Makaveli

== See also ==
- 1996 in music
- R&B number-one hits of 1996 (USA)
