= You Remind Me of Something =

1995 single by R. Kelly

- Standard artwork (U.S. CD single pictured)

Single by R. Kelly

from the album R. Kelly
- Released: October 27, 1995
- Genre: R&B
- Length: 4:10
- Label: Jive
- Songwriter: Robert Kelly
- Producer: R. Kelly

R. Kelly singles chronology
"Summer Bunnies" (1994)	"You Remind Me of Something" (1995)	"Down Low (Nobody Has to Know)" (1995)

"You Remind Me of Something" is a song by American R&B singer R. Kelly. Released as the lead single from his self-titled album (1995), it became the fourth song from Kelly to reach number one on the US Billboard Hot R&B Singles chart, where it stayed for a week, and peaked at number four on the Billboard Hot 100. Worldwide, it peaked at number 13 in New Zealand and found moderate success in the Netherlands and the United Kingdom.

== Critical reception ==
Gil L. Robertson IV from Cash Box picked "You Remind Me of Something" as a "standout track" of the R. Kelly album. James Masterton for Dotmusic wrote, "This is yet another typical R. Kelly single, displaying as it does all that is both good and bad about US swingbeat tracks."

== Music video ==
The accompanying music video for "You Remind Me of Something" is directed by David Nelson.

== Charts ==
=== Weekly charts ===
Chart (1995–1996)	Peak position
Australia (ARIA)	96
Netherlands (Dutch Top 40 Tipparade)	8
Netherlands (Single Top 100)	41
New Zealand (Recorded Music NZ)	13
Scotland Singles (OCC)	65
UK Singles (OCC)	24
UK Dance (OCC)	18
UK Hip Hop/R&B (OCC)	3
US Billboard Hot 100	4
US Hot R&B/Hip-Hop Songs (Billboard)	1
US Rhythmic Airplay (Billboard)	9

=== Year-end charts ===
Chart (1996)	Position
US Billboard Hot 100	83
US Hot R&B Singles (Billboard)	57
US Top 40/Rhythm-Crossover (Billboard)	60

== Certifications ==
Region	Certification	Certified units/sales
United States (RIAA)	Platinum	1,000,000^{^}
^{^} Shipments figures based on certification alone.

== Release history ==
Region	Date	Format(s)	Label(s)	Ref.
United States	October 27, 1995	CD; cassette	Jive	
United Kingdom	October 30, 1995	12-inch vinyl; CD; cassette	Jive	
Japan	December 24, 1995	CD	Jive	

== See also ==
- List of number-one R&B singles of 1995 (U.S.)
