= Twisted (Keith Sweat song) =

1996 single by Keith Sweat

Single by Keith Sweat

from the album Keith Sweat
- Released: June 4, 1996
- Recorded: 1995
- Genre: R&B; pop; soul
- Length: 4:30
- Label: Elektra
- Songwriters: Keith Sweat; Eric McCaine; Athena Cage; Lavonn Battle; Tabitha Duncan; Marvin Gaye; David Ritz; Elliott Brown
- Producers: Keith Sweat; Eric McCaine

Keith Sweat singles chronology
"Get Up on It" (1994)	"Twisted" (1996)	"Nobody" (1996)

Music video
- "Twisted" on YouTube

"Twisted" is a song by American singer and songwriter Keith Sweat, released as a single in June 1996 by Elektra Records. It was the first song released from his self-titled fifth album (1996). American R&B group Kut Klose and remix rapper Pretty Russ are also featured on the song. The radio version of "Twisted" omits Pretty Russ' rap before the final chorus, though some urban stations kept the rap verse. A second mix of the song, referred to as the Flavahood Sexual remix, features a different backbeat sampled from Marvin Gaye's song "Sexual Healing". "Flavahood" also saw significant airplay on radio but was never released on an album.

Commercially, "Twisted" spent three weeks at No. 1 on the US Billboard Hot R&B Singles chart and peaked at No. 2 on both the Billboard Hot 100 and Cash Box Top 100 charts, becoming Sweat's biggest hit. "Twisted" also peaked at No. 1 on the Billboard Top 40/Rhythm-Crossover chart, staying there for 14 consecutive weeks, the most amongst any song except TLC's "No Scrubs", which spent 15 weeks at the top position. Outside the US, "Twisted" topped the New Zealand Singles Chart for six weeks and became a top-20 hit in Australia and the Netherlands. In 2012, VH1 ranked the song at number 35 on their list of the "40 Greatest R&B Songs of the '90s".

== Track listings ==
- US CD single
1. "Twisted" (album version)
2. "Twisted" (Flavahood Sexual Remix)
3. "Twisted" (Sweat Shop Party Remix)
4. Album excerpts: "Chocolate Girl" / "Funky Dope Lovin'" / "Just a Touch"
5. "Twisted" (album version instrumental)
6. "Twisted" (a cappella)
- US cassette single

A. "Twisted" (radio version)
B. Album excerpts: "Chocolate Girl" / "Funky Dope Lovin'" / "Just a Touch"

- UK and Australian CD single
1. "Twisted" (radio version with rap) – 4:10
2. "Twisted" (Flavahood Sexual remix) – 5:03
3. "Twisted" (Sweat Shop Party remix edit w/o rap) – 4:12
4. "Twisted" (Flavahood Sexual remix edit w/o rap) – 4:01
5. "Twisted" (Flavahood Sexual instrumental) – 5:03
6. "Twisted" (a cappella) – 4:33

== Charts ==
=== Weekly charts ===
Chart (1996–1997)	Peak position
Australia (ARIA)	9
Canada (Nielsen SoundScan)	16
Canada Dance/Urban (RPM)	21
Iceland (Íslenski Listinn Topp 40)	35
Netherlands (Dutch Top 40)	14
Netherlands (Single Top 100)	17
New Zealand (Recorded Music NZ)	1
UK Singles (Official Charts)	39
UK Dance (Official Charts)	6
UK Hip Hop/R&B (Official Charts)	6
US Billboard Hot 100	2
US Dance Singles Sales (Billboard)	5
US Hot R&B/Hip-Hop Songs (Billboard)	1
US Pop Airplay (Billboard)	7
US Rhythmic Airplay (Billboard)	1
US Cash Box Top 100	2

=== Year-end charts ===
Chart (1996)	Position
Netherlands (Dutch Top 40)	55
Netherlands (Single Top 100)	95
New Zealand (RIANZ)	7
US Billboard Hot 100	10
US Hot R&B Singles (Billboard)	5
US Top 40/Mainstream (Billboard)	45
US Top 40/Rhythm-Crossover (Billboard)	1

Chart (1997)	Position
Australia (ARIA)	43
US Billboard Hot 100	93
US Rhythmic Top 40 (Billboard)	42
US Top 40/Mainstream (Billboard)	60

=== Decade-end charts ===
Chart (1990–1999)	Position
US Billboard Hot 100	89

== Certifications ==
Region	Certification	Certified units/sales
Australia (ARIA)	Platinum	70,000^{^}
New Zealand (RMNZ)	Platinum	10,000^{*}
United States (RIAA)	Platinum	1,600,000
^{*} Sales figures based on certification alone.^{^} Shipments figures based on certification alone.

== Release history ==
Region	Date	Format(s)	Label(s)	Ref.
United States	May 21, 1996	Rhythmic contemporary radio	Elektra	
United States	June 4, 1996	CD	Elektra	
United Kingdom	June 10, 1996	12-inch vinyl; CD; cassette	Elektra	
United States	July 16, 1996	Contemporary hit radio	Elektra	

== See also ==
- List of number-one R&B singles of 1996 (U.S.)
