= Athena Cage =

American singer, producer and songwriter

- Born: Athena Denise Cage; May 6, 1970 (age 56); Russellville, Kentucky, United States
- Genres: Pop; R&B; soul; adult contemporary; urban; gospel
- Occupations: Singer; songwriter; producer
- Instrument: Vocals
- Years active: 1992–present
- Labels: Elektra; Adamas; Priority
- Member of: Kut Klose
- Website: AthenaCage.com

Athena Denise Cage (born May 6, 1970) is an American singer, producer and songwriter from Kentucky. She is best known for being featured on the 1996 hit Nobody with Keith Sweat.

== Early life and education ==
Athena Cage was born and raised in Russellville, Kentucky, United States. She was educated at Western Kentucky University.

== Philanthropy and community service ==
In 2003, Cage established "The Athena Cage Scholarship Fund" at Western Kentucky University, her alma mater. The money for the scholarship was raised through a concert series. At the second concert of the series in 2004, she teamed up with Dionne Warwick.

== Honors ==
She was also bestowed with the title Kentucky Colonel by Ernie Fletcher, the Governor of Kentucky. In 2004, Second Street in Russellville, where she grew up, was renamed to "Athena Cage Way" to honor her community work, youth service and efforts to restore the Old Logan Theater.

== Discography ==
=== Albums ===
- 2001: The Art Of A Woman (Unreleased)

=== Singles ===
Year	Song	Chart Positions						Album
Year	Song	US	US R&B	Rhythmic Top 40	Dance Maxi- Singles Sales	Top 40 Mainstream	CAN	Album
1996	"Nobody" (Keith Sweat featuring Athena Cage)	3	1	1	11	12	16	Keith Sweat
2001	"Hey Hey"	-	60	33	-	-	-	The Art Of A Woman
2001	"Until You Come Back To Me"	-	-	-	-	-	-	The Art Of A Woman
2001	"All Or Nothing"	-	-	-	-	-	-	The Art Of A Woman and Save The Last Dance soundtrack
