= Nobody (Keith Sweat song) =

1996 single by Keith Sweat

Single by Keith Sweat featuring Athena Cage

from the album Keith Sweat
- B-side: "In the Mood"
- Released: September 17, 1996
- Studio: The Sweat Shop (Atlanta, Georgia)
- Length: 4:24 (album version); 4:14 (radio version)
- Label: Elektra
- Composers: Keith Sweat; Fitzgerald Scott
- Lyricists: Keith Sweat; Athena Cage
- Producer: Keith Sweat

Keith Sweat singles chronology
"Twisted" (1996)	"Nobody" (1996)	"Just a Touch" (1997)

Music video
- "Nobody" on YouTube

"Nobody" is a song by American singer-songwriter Keith Sweat featuring Athena Cage from the band Kut Klose. The song was released in September 1996 by Elektra Records as the second single from Sweat's fifth studio album, Keith Sweat (1996). It spent three weeks at No. 1 on the US Billboard Hot R&B Singles chart and reached No. 3 and 8 on the Billboard Hot 100 and Cash Box Top 100 charts. Internationally, "Nobody" reached No. 9 in New Zealand, No. 10 in the Netherlands, No. 16 in Canada, and No. 22 in Australia. The music video for the single features a young Mekhi Phifer. The song contains samples and interpolations of the Isley Brothers' 1983 hit "Choosey Lover" which would later be reused in Sweat's 2002 song "One On One".

== Track listings ==
- US 7-inch, CD, and cassette single
1. "Nobody" (radio edit) – 4:10
2. "In the Mood" – 3:48
- UK CD single
1. "Nobody" (Vybe '97 Mix) – 4:24
2. "Nobody" (Vybe '97 Part II) – 4:24
3. "Nobody" (album version) – 4:22
4. "Nobody" (Vibe Mix instrumental)
- UK 12-inch single

A1. "Nobody" (Vybe '97 Mix) – 4:19
A2. "Nobody" (Vybe '97 Part II) – 4:22
B1. "Nobody" (Vibe Mix instrumental) – 4:23
B2. "Nobody" (album version) – 4:20

- UK cassette single
1. "Nobody" (Vybe '97 Mix) – 4:24
2. "Nobody" (album version) – 4:23
- European CD single
1. "Nobody" (radio edit) – 4:10
2. "In the Mood" (LP version) – 3:46
3. "Why Me Baby?" (LP version) – 5:28
- Australian CD single
1. "Nobody" (radio edit) – 4:10
2. "Nobody" (Ghetto Love Mix) – 4:11
3. "Nobody" (The Chanz Remix) – 4:57
4. "Nobody" (Deep End Remix) – 4:47
5. "Nobody" (Deep End Club Mix extended) – 5:59

== Credits and personnel ==
Credits are lifted from the US and UK CD singles liner notes.

Studio

- Recorded at the Sweat Shop (Atlanta, Georgia, US)
- Mixed at Southern Tracks (Atlanta, Georgia, US)

Personnel

- Keith Sweat – composition, lyrics, vocals, background vocals, production, executive production
- Fitzgerald Scott – composition, background vocals, keyboard and drum programming
- Athena Cage – lyrics, vocals
- Karl Heilbron – bass guitar, engineering, mixing
- Caram Costanzo – additional engineering, mixing assistant
- Larry Cianelli – editing

== Charts ==
=== Weekly charts ===
Chart (1996–1997)	Peak position
Australia (ARIA)	22
Canada (Nielsen SoundScan)	16
Iceland (Íslenski Listinn Topp 40)	26
Netherlands (Dutch Top 40)	12
Netherlands (Single Top 100)	10
New Zealand (Recorded Music NZ)	9
UK Singles (Official Charts)	30
UK Dance (Official Charts)	20
UK Hip Hop/R&B (Official Charts)	7
US Billboard Hot 100	3
US Dance Singles Sales (Billboard)	11
US Hot R&B/Hip-Hop Songs (Billboard)	1
US Pop Airplay (Billboard)	12
US Rhythmic Airplay (Billboard)	1
US Cash Box Top 100	8

=== Year-end charts ===
Chart (1996)	Position
US Billboard Hot 100	73
US Hot R&B Singles (Billboard)	42

Chart (1997)	Position
Netherlands (Dutch Top 40)	59
Netherlands (Single Top 100)	42
US Billboard Hot 100	16
US Hot R&B Singles (Billboard)	19
US Rhythmic Top 40 (Billboard)	3
US Top 40/Mainstream (Billboard)	40

== Certifications ==
Region	Certification	Certified units/sales
New Zealand (RMNZ)	Platinum	30,000^{‡}
United States (RIAA)	Platinum	1,800,000
^{‡} Sales+streaming figures based on certification alone.

== Release history ==
Region	Date	Format(s)	Label(s)	Ref.
United States	September 17, 1996	7-inch vinyl; CD; cassette	Elektra	
United States	October 1, 1996	Rhythmic contemporary radio	Elektra	
United States	December 10, 1996	Contemporary hit radio	Elektra	
United Kingdom	April 21, 1997	12-inch vinyl; CD; cassette	Elektra	

== In popular culture ==
In 2019, Keith Sweat did a parody of his song called "Nobody (Sweat Defense Remix)" for the product called Old Spice Sweat Defense where he takes shots at the men's deodorant brand and defends Washington Redskins rookie Montez Sweat's last name in the process. This was never broadcast as a commercial for television, but instead can be viewed online on YouTube.

== See also ==
- List of number-one R&B singles of 1996 (U.S.)
