= Down Low (Nobody Has to Know) =

Single by R. Kelly featuring Ronald Isley and Ernie Isley

from the album R. Kelly
- Released: 1995
- Recorded: 1995
- Genre: R&B
- Length: 4:49
- Label: Jive
- Songwriter: Robert Kelly
- Producer: R. Kelly

R. Kelly singles chronology
"You Remind Me of Something" (1995)	"Down Low (Nobody Has to Know)" (1995)	"Thank God It's Friday" (1996)

The Isley Brothers singles chronology
"I'm So Proud" (1994)	"Down Low (Nobody Has to Know)" (1995)	"Let's Lay Together" (1996)

"Down Low (Nobody Has to Know)" is an R&B song about infidelity by American singer and songwriter R. Kelly, released in 1995, by Jive Records, from Kelly's second and self-titled album (1995). The song peaked at number four on the US Billboard Hot 100 and number one on the Billboard R&B Singles Chart for seven weeks, making it Kelly's fifth single to do so on the latter. It features the guest vocals of American R&B singer Ronald Isley of the Isley Brothers. The lyrics are from the perspective of a woman's affair partner, who tells her to keep their relationship a closely guarded secret.

== Critical reception ==
Larry Flick from Billboard magazine felt the song "has a seductive slow groove that gives him another showcase for his increasingly mature crooning skills and flexible vocal range." He added "Ronald and Ernie Isley make a fine guest appearance that adds to the track's plush, old-school soul tone. Beyond Kelly's steamy performance, there is a tightly constructed melody that is fattened by a hypnotic refrain. Instant saturation at pop and R&B radio is assured."

== Music video ==
The music video for "Down Low (Nobody Has to Know)" was directed by Hype Williams and R. Kelly. Mr. Biggs (Ronald Isley) is a mob boss who sends for his employee Kelly (R. Kelly), telling him he is going on a business trip and wants Kelly to take care of his wife Lila (Garcelle Beauvais), but warns him never to touch her. The two are then seen having an affair. When the two are together in Kelly's bed, Mr. Biggs enters the apartment with his bodyguards who beat up Kelly and drive him out to the desert, where he is abandoned. The next scene shows Kelly using a wheelchair in the hospital, where he finds Lila on life support. He tearfully declares his love for her and she dies from her wounds.

== Legacy ==
Ron Isley would continue to use "Mr. Biggs" as his moniker, e.g. in 1998 on Kelly Price's song "Friend of Mine", and in 2001 on his group's song "Contagious", which serves as a sequel to this song.

R&B singer The Weeknd called the song the reason he's in the business of making music and covered it in 2017. Chris Brown and Trey Songz both sampled this song on "Songs on 12 Play" from Brown's sixth album X.

=== Pop culture references ===
The song appeared in the eleventh episode of the first season of the sitcom Moesha and the 2003 film "Old School".

This video is loosely based on the 1946 noir classic Gilda and the Kevin Costner film Revenge.

The Isley Brothers and R. Kelly released a follow-up to "Down Low" in 2001 entitled "Contagious". In both the song and music video, Mr. Biggs returns home to find his new girlfriend (played by Chante Moore) having an affair with Kelly. Once again Mr. Biggs bodyguards come in the room to do some damage, but this time R. Kelly's bodyguards come in the room as well, and no harm is done.

== Personnel ==
- R. Kelly: Co-lead vocals, instruments, producer, writer, arranger, composer
- Ronald Isley: Co-lead and backing vocals
- Ernie Isley: Guitars, backing vocals

== Charts ==
=== Weekly charts ===
Chart (1996)	Peak position
New Zealand (Recorded Music NZ)	23
Scottish Singles Sales (Official Charts)	70
UK Singles (Official Charts)	23
UK Hip Hop/R&B (Official Charts)	5
US Billboard Hot 100	4
US Hot R&B/Hip-Hop Songs (Billboard)	1
US Rhythmic Airplay (Billboard)	6

=== Year-end charts ===
Chart (1996)	Position
US Hot R&B/Hip-Hop Songs (Billboard)	4

== Certifications ==
Region	Certification	Certified units/sales
United States (RIAA)	Platinum	1,100,000

== See also ==
- List of number-one R&B singles of 1996 (U.S.)
