= You're Makin' Me High =

1996 single by Toni Braxton

- US artwork (commercial CD maxi-single pictured)

Single by Toni Braxton

from the album Secrets
- A-side: "Let It Flow"
- Released: May 13, 1996
- Studio: The Record Plant (Los Angeles); DARP (Atlanta, Georgia)
- Genre: Jeep funk; R&B; West Coast hip-hop
- Length: 4:27 (album mix); 4:12 (single mix)
- Label: LaFace; Arista
- Songwriters: Kenneth Edmonds; Bryce Wilson
- Producers: Babyface; Bryce Wilson

Toni Braxton singles chronology
"I Belong to You" / "How Many Ways" (1994)	"You're Makin' Me High" / "Let It Flow" (1996)	"Un-Break My Heart" (1996)

Music video
- "You're Makin' Me High" on YouTube

"You're Makin' Me High" is a song by American singer Toni Braxton, released in May 1996, by LaFace and Arista Records, as the lead single from her second studio album, Secrets (1996). The mid-tempo song represents a joint collaboration between the Grammy Award-winning producer Babyface and Bryce Wilson. The beat of the song was originally for singer-songwriter Brandy, with Dallas Austin pegged to write a lyric to override; however, Braxton had Babyface write lyrics for the song. It was ultimately issued in the United States as a double A-side with "Let It Flow", the airplay hit from the 1995 film Waiting to Exhale.

"You're Makin' Me High" became Braxton's first number-one single on both the US Billboard Hot 100 and Hot R&B Singles charts. Worldwide, the song became a top-10 hit in multiple countries, entering the top five in Australia, Canada, New Zealand, and Spain. The accompanying music video was directed by Bille Woodruff. Several remixes of the track were made, including a dance remix by David Morales, an urban remix featuring rapper Foxy Brown, and a dancehall mix featuring Jamaican dancehall DJ Mad Cobra.

The song earned Braxton her third Grammy Award for Best Female R&B Vocal Performance in 1997. The success of "You're Makin' Me High" would later be continued with the release of "Un-Break My Heart". "You're Makin' Me High" was sampled for Method Man & Redman's 2001 song "Part II", from the How High soundtrack. In 2014, Anglo-American producer/DJ Secondcity sampled a part of the song's bridge for the main hook of his UK number-one single "I Wanna Feel".

== Critical reception ==
Larry Flick from Billboard magazine described the song a "sleek'n'sexy slice o' jeep funk" with a "sophisticated toned and rich production", as well as praising the song's chorus. Peter Miro from Cash Box remarked that Braxton "oozes sensuality with her phrasing on 'You're Makin' Me High', mated to tight, cascading backup harmonies, and a crossover-capable bass line. She projects allure sufficient enough to perpetuate her sultry, waif-like mystique." Alan Jones from Music Week declared it as "a nagging and surprisingly sprightly R&B workout", with the singer's "exceptional" vocals and deemed it "an obvious hit".

Damien Mendis from the RM Dance Update gave the song a full score of five out of five, writing, "Oh my gosh! The ever-reliable Babyface hooks up with Bryce Wilson of Groove Theory to create a definitive true R&B flave that'll leave you begging for more. Check the recipe: phat 'Tell Me'-style beats, Intro/Edie Brickell-ish guitar licks entwined with subtle bass and a floating eastern-sounding moog hook. Toni's effortlessly smooth vocal is textured beautifully with lushly layered backing harmonies. Delicious!" In a retrospective review, Pop Rescue complimented it as a "wonderful mid-tempo song, making the most of the sultry vocals, slinky bass and beats." The reviewer also added that the backing vocals "sound great – adding an extra layer of warmth." Richard Harrington from The Washington Post stated that Braxton "can handle airy, upbeat material", like "You're Makin' Me High". He explained, "With its sinewy synth-line, it has more of a West Coast sound than most LaFace productions, but the impression is more joyful than ominous. A celebration of sexual desire, it also includes a bit of erotic breathing and a coy masturbation reference".

== Music video ==
The music video for "You're Makin' Me High", directed by American director Bille Woodruff, features Braxton and a group of friends (consisting of actresses Erika Alexander, Vivica A. Fox, and Tisha Campbell) enjoying themselves in luxurious surroundings. An elevator brings up a series of men. Braxton and her friends "judge" the men using oversized playing cards as score cards. Periodically, one of the women chooses a man to leave with. Braxton chooses Bryce Wilson, whom she dated at the time, and they are shown together in a bathtub of cotton candy and on a dance floor, with Braxton also shown wearing a white bodysuit. The music video premiered on MTV, BET, and VH1 on the week ending May 5, 1996.

== Track listings ==
=== United States ===
- CD single
1. "You're Makin' Me High" (album version) – 4:27
2. "Let It Flow" (album version) – 4:21
- Maxi-CD single
1. "You're Makin' Me High" (album version) – 4:27
2. "You're Makin' Me High" (classic mix) – 9:41
3. "You're Makin' Me High" (dance hall mix) – 4:51
4. "You're Makin' Me High" (groove remix) – 4:32
5. "Let It Flow" – 4:21
- 12-inch single

A1. "You're Makin' Me High" (classic mix) – 9:41
A2. "You're Makin' Me High" (classic dub) – 6:12
B1. "You're Makin' Me High" (groove remix) – 4:32
B2. "You're Makin' Me High" (dance hall mix) – 4:51
B3. "You're Makin' Me High" (album version) – 4:27
B4. "Let It Flow" – 4:21

- 7-inch single

A. "You're Makin' Me High" – 4:07
B. "Let It Flow" – 4:21

- Cassette single

A1. "You're Makin' Me High" (radio edit) – 4:07
A2. "Let It Flow" (album version) – 4:22
B1. "You're Makin' Me High" (instrumental) – 4:07
B2. "Let It Flow" (instrumental) – 4:22

- Maxi-cassette single

A1. "You're Makin' Me High" (classic mix) – 9:41
A2. "You're Makin' Me High" (groove remix) – 4:32
A3. "Let It Flow" – 4:21
B1. "You're Makin' Me High" (dance hall mix) – 4:51
B2. "You're Makin' Me High" (album version) – 4:27

=== International ===
- UK CD1
1. "You're Makin' Me High" (radio edit)
2. "You're Makin' Me High" (T'empo's radio edit)
3. "You're Makin' Me High" (dancehall mix)
4. "You're Makin' Me High" (groove remix)
5. "You're Makin' Me High" (T'empo's private club mix)
6. "You're Makin' Me High" (classic mix—Morales)
- UK CD2
1. "You're Makin' Me High" (radio edit)
2. "Let It Flow"
3. "Breathe Again"
4. "Another Sad Love Song"
- UK cassette single
1. "You're Makin' Me High" (radio edit)
2. "Let It Flow"
- European CD single
1. "You're Makin' Me High" (album version/radio edit) – 4:07
2. "You're Makin' Me High" (classic edit) – 3:35
- Australian and Japanese CD single
1. "You're Makin' Me High" (album version/radio edit) – 4:07
2. "You're Makin' Me High" (album version) – 4:26
3. "You're Makin' Me High" (classic edit) – 3:35
4. "You're Makin' Me High" (classic mix) – 9:41

== Personnel ==
Personnel are adapted from the Secrets liner notes.

- Toni Braxton: lead vocals, background vocals
- Kenneth "Babyface" Edmonds: writer, producer, keyboards, guitar, background vocals
- Bryce Wilson: writer, producer, keyboards, programming
- Chante Moore, Marc Nelson, Jakkai Butler: background vocals
- Brad Gilderman, Russell Elevado: recording
- Bassy Bob Brockman: mixing
- Paul Boutin, Robbes Stieglietz, Bryan Reminic: assistant engineers
- Randy Walker: midi programming

== Charts ==
=== Weekly charts ===
Chart (1996–1997)	Peak position
Australia (ARIA)	2
Canada (Nielsen SoundScan)	6
Canada Contemporary Hit Radio (The Record)	3
Canada Top Singles (RPM)	5
Canada Adult Contemporary (RPM)	16
Canada Dance/Urban (RPM)	1
Europe (Eurochart Hot 100)	30
Europe (European Dance Radio)	3
Germany (GfK)	47
Ireland (IRMA)	21
Israel (Israeli Singles Chart)	6
Netherlands (Dutch Top 40)	13
Netherlands (Single Top 100)	18
New Zealand (Recorded Music NZ)	5
Scottish Singles Sales (Official Charts)	26
Spain (AFYVE)	5
Sweden (Sverigetopplistan)	11
UK Singles (Official Charts)	7
UK Hip Hop/R&B (Official Charts)	2
US Billboard Hot 100	1
US Adult Pop Airplay (Billboard)	28
US Dance Club Songs (Billboard)	1
US Dance Singles Sales (Billboard)	2
US Hot R&B/Hip-Hop Songs (Billboard)	1
US Pop Airplay (Billboard)	6
US Rhythmic Airplay (Billboard)	2

=== Year-end charts ===
Chart (1996)	Position
Australia (ARIA)	10
Canada Top Singles (RPM)	57
Canada Dance/Urban (RPM)	20
Netherlands (Dutch Top 40)	74
Netherlands (Single Top 100)	92
New Zealand (RIANZ)	22
Sweden (Topplistan)	50
UK Singles (OCC)	79
US Billboard Hot 100	9
US Dance Club Play (Billboard)	5
US Hot R&B Singles (Billboard)	1
US Maxi-Singles Sales (Billboard)	7
US Top 40/Mainstream (Billboard)	20
US Top 40/Rhythm-Crossover (Billboard)	5

Chart (1997)	Position
US Billboard Hot 100	98

=== Decade-end charts ===
Chart (1990–1999)	Position
US Billboard Hot 100	68

== Certifications ==
Region	Certification	Certified units/sales
Australia (ARIA)	Platinum	70,000^{^}
New Zealand (RMNZ) Physical sales	Platinum	10,000^{*}
New Zealand (RMNZ) Digital sales + streaming	Gold	15,000^{‡}
United Kingdom (BPI)	Gold	400,000^{‡}
United States (RIAA)	Platinum	1,500,000
^{*} Sales figures based on certification alone.^{^} Shipments figures based on certification alone.^{‡} Sales+streaming figures based on certification alone.

== Release history ==
Region	Date	Format(s)	Label(s)	Ref(s).
United States	May 13–14, 1996	Contemporary hit radio; rhythmic contemporary radio; urban contemporary radio	LaFace; Arista	
United States	May 21, 1996	7-inch vinyl; 12-inch vinyl; CD; cassette	LaFace; Arista	
Sweden	June 3, 1996	CD	LaFace; Arista; BMG	
Japan	June 28, 1996	CD	LaFace; Arista; BMG	
United Kingdom	July 1, 1996	CD; cassette	LaFace; Arista; BMG	

== See also ==
- R&B number-one hits of 1996 (USA)
- Hot 100 number-one hits of 1996 (United States)
- Number-one dance hits of 1996 (USA)
