= Let It Flow (song) =

- Artwork that commercializes "You're Makin' Me High (The Remix)"/"Let It Flow"

Single by Toni Braxton

from the album Waiting to Exhale: Original Soundtrack Album and Secrets
- A-side: "You're Makin' Me High"
- Released: May 21, 1996
- Recorded: 1995
- Studio: The Record Plant (Hollywood, CA); The Tracken Place (Beverly Hills, CA); The Hit Factory (New York City, NY)
- Genre: R&B
- Length: 4:21
- Label: LaFace
- Songwriter: Babyface
- Producer: Babyface

Toni Braxton singles chronology
"I Belong to You/How Many Ways" (1994)	"Let It Flow" / "You're Makin' Me High" (1996)	"Un-Break My Heart" (1996)

Music video
- "Let It Flow" by Toni Braxton on YouTube

"Let It Flow" is a song by American singer Toni Braxton. Written and produced by Babyface, the song was originally recorded for, and included on, the soundtrack to the 1995 motion picture Waiting to Exhale.

"Let It Flow" was released as a double A-side with "You're Makin' Me High", the lead single from Braxton's second studio album, Secrets (1996). At the time the single was issued, "Let It Flow" was already receiving strong radio airplay in the United States, and the two tracks eventually topped the Billboard Hot 100 and Hot R&B/Hip-Hop Songs charts.

== Music video ==
The music video for "Let It Flow" directed by Herb Ritts features water imagery throughout. Braxton is shown singing while surrounded by men painted blue facing away from her, and this is interspersed with shots of the men behind and in front of screens of water flowing. She is also shown singing while sitting on a white float in the middle of a still body of water.

== Reception ==
The double-A side single debuted at number seven on the Hot 100 and number two on the Hot R&B Singles chart, the issue dated June 8, 1996, becoming Braxton's highest-debuting single. It eventually topped the Hot 100 chart for a week, and the Hot R&B Singles chart for two weeks, which was her first number one single on both charts. Due to its staying power on the Hot R&B Singles chart, it was the #1 R&B Single on the 1996's Billboard year-end charts. The single sold over 1,500,000 copies in the United States and was certified Platinum by the RIAA on July 17, 1996.

Just as soon as the soundtrack was released, the song received critical acclaim, being chosen as one of the best tracks on the album by critics. Stephen Holden, the music critic of the New York Times, called it "small pop coup" and added "Braxton snaps out the words with a choked intensity, her dark, grainy contralto conveying a potent mixture of fury and sensuality."

== Personnel and credits ==
Credits adapted from album liner notes.

- Toni Braxton: lead vocals, background vocals
- Kenneth "Babyface" Edmonds: writer, producer, keyboards, guitar, programming
- Reggie Griffin: guitar
- Brad Gilderman: recording
- Jon Gass: mixing
- Paul Boutin, Larry Schalit, Robbes Stieglietz, Kyle Bess: assistant engineers
- Randy Walker: midi programming
- Ivy Skoff: production coordinator

== Charts ==
=== Weekly charts ===
Weekly chart performance for "Let It Flow"
Chart (1996)	Peak position
US Billboard Hot 100	1
US Adult Contemporary (Billboard)	9
US Hot Dance Singles Sales (Billboard)	2
US Hot R&B/Hip-Hop Songs (Billboard)	1

=== Year-end charts ===
Year-end chart performance for "Let It Flow"
Chart (1996)	Position
US Billboard Hot 100	9
Chart (1997)	Position
US Billboard Hot 100	98

=== Decade-end charts ===
Decade-end chart performance for "Let It Flow"
Chart (1990–1999)	Position
US Billboard Hot 100	68

== See also ==
- R&B number-one hits of 1996 (USA)
- Hot 100 number-one hits of 1996 (United States)
- Number-one dance hits of 1996 (USA)
