= I Can't Sleep Baby (If I) =

1996 single by R. Kelly

- Artwork for UK and Dutch commercial releases

Single by R. Kelly

from the album R. Kelly
- Released: June 21, 1996
- Length: 5:31 (album edit); 4:41 (radio edit)
- Label: Jive
- Songwriter: Robert Kelly
- Producer: R. Kelly

R. Kelly singles chronology
"Thank God It's Friday" (1996)	"I Can't Sleep Baby (If I)" (1996)	"I Believe I Can Fly" (1996)

"I Can't Sleep Baby (If I)" is a single by American R&B singer R. Kelly from his 1995 eponymous album. The song spent two weeks at number one on the US Billboard Hot R&B Singles chart (Kelly's sixth number-one R&B hit) and peaked at number five on the Billboard Hot 100. Outside the US, the single reached the top 20 in New Zealand, peaking at number 14.

== Background ==
Kelly wrote this song after he split from his girlfriend at that time, whom he was deeply in love with. In 2010, Kelly said he still has not gotten over this girl, who remained anonymous. He ranked this song as one of his favorites that he has recorded.

In his autobiography, Kelly states that he originally intended the song to be recorded by Toni Braxton. However, Braxton was unhappy about the fact that they would not be writing together, and she disagreed with Kelly over how the melody would be sung. They agreed to disagree, and Kelly recorded the song himself.

== Critical reception ==
A reviewer from Music Week rated the song three out of five, adding, "Sounding more like Boyz II Men than R Kelly, this sickly-sweet ballad will nevertheless attract the usual crowd." The magazine's Alan Jones wrote that it is "a tender ballad softly sung by Kelly (until the ad-lib outro, where he emotes more forcefully, but no less tastefully) with a restrained groin-grinding backing. Fragile but powerful, it floats in on a breeze, and deserves to be a huge summer hit."

== Music video ==
The music video for both the original and the remix is directed by Hype Williams. The music video for the original song opens with R. Kelly, driving on a snowy road. He is then shown singing outside a house and then inside the house. He drives to a phone booth, finishing the song outside. Finally, wearing a fur coat, he sees a helicopter, boards it, and it flies away. Puff Daddy features on the video of the remix.

== Live performance ==
R. Kelly does not often perform this song despite its huge success. The first time he performed this song was at The Down Low Top Secret Tour in 1996.

== Charts ==
=== Weekly charts ===
Chart (1996)	Peak position
Australia (ARIA)	108
Austria (Ö3 Austria Top 40)	37
Germany (GfK)	63
Netherlands (Dutch Top 40)	33
Netherlands (Single Top 100)	42
New Zealand (Recorded Music NZ)	14
US Billboard Hot 100	5
US Hot R&B/Hip-Hop Songs (Billboard)	1
US Pop Airplay (Billboard)	17
US Rhythmic Airplay (Billboard)	3

=== Year-end charts ===
Chart (1996)	Position
US Billboard Hot 100	27
US Hot R&B Singles (Billboard)	16
US Top 40/Mainstream (Billboard)	59
US Top 40/Rhythm-Crossover (Billboard)	12

== Certifications ==
Region	Certification	Certified units/sales
United States (RIAA)	Platinum	932,000

== Release history ==
Region	Date	Format(s)	Label(s)	Ref.
United States	June 21, 1996	—N/a	Jive	
United States	June 25, 1996	Contemporary hit radio	Jive	
Japan	August 21, 1996	CD	Jive	

== Samplings ==
In 2011, Gospel singer Genita Pugh sampled this song for her single "Can't Live" on her album My Purpose. In 2017, American hip hop rapper PnB Rock sampled this song for his song "Hanging Up My Jersey" (featuring Ty Dolla Sign) on his album GTTM: Goin Thru the Motions.

== See also ==
- R&B number-one hits of 1996 (USA)
