= Hay (song) =

Single by Crucial Conflict

from the album The Final Tic
- B-side: "Showdown"
- Released: April 23, 1996
- Recorded: 1995
- Studio: The Barn (Chicago, Illinois)
- Genre: Midwest hip-hop
- Length: 4:20
- Label: Universal
- Songwriters: Wondosas Martin; Marrico King; Corey Johnson; Ralph Leverston
- Producers: Shorty Capone (exec.); Fab 5 Freddy (exec.); Roy "Black Prince" Cormier (exec.); Wildstyle

Crucial Conflict singles chronology
"Hay" (1996)	"Ride the Rodeo" (1996)

Music video
- "Hay" on YouTube

"Hay" is a song written and performed by American hip hop group Crucial Conflict, released as the lead single from their debut full-length album, The Final Tic (1996). It was recorded at The Barn in Chicago, Illinois and produced by member Wildstyle, who used a sample of Funkadelic's "I'll Stay". "Hay" became the group's breakthrough hit, peaking at number 18 in the United States and number 3 in New Zealand. The single was certified gold by the RIAA on July 18, 1996, and helped the album reach gold status less than two months later. Complex placed the song at number 4 on their 50 Greatest Chicago Rap Songs.

== Track listing ==
No.	Title	Length
1.	"Hay" (Album version)	4:20
2.	"Hay" (Instrumental)	4:20
3.	"Showdown" (Album version)	4:40
4.	"Hay" (Accapella)	4:21

== Personnel ==
- Wondosas "Kilo" Martin – songwriter, vocals
- Marrico "Never" King – songwriter, vocals
- Corey "Coldhard" Johnson – songwriter, vocals
- Ralph "Wildstyle" Leverston – songwriter, vocals, producer, engineering
- Fred Brathwaite – executive producer
- Roy "Black Prince" Cormier – executive producer
- Shorty Capone – executive producer
- Andrew Griffin – assistant engineering (track 1)
- QBall – assistant engineering (track 3)
- Chris Shepherd – mixing (track 1)
- Ron Lowe – mixing (track 3)
- Tom Carlyle – mixing (track 3)
- Dennis Ferrante – mastering
- Daniel Hastings – photography
- Miguel Rivera – design

== Charts ==
=== Weekly charts ===
Chart (1996)	Peak position
New Zealand (Recorded Music NZ)	3
US Billboard Hot 100	18
US Hot R&B/Hip-Hop Songs (Billboard)	10
US R&B/Hip-Hop Airplay (Billboard)	24
US R&B/Hip-Hop Streaming Songs (Billboard)	19
US Hot Rap Songs (Billboard)	2
US Rhythmic Airplay (Billboard)	36
US Cash Box Top 100	15

=== Year-end charts ===
Chart (1996)	Position
New Zealand (Recorded Music NZ)	26
US Billboard Hot 100	93

== Certifications ==
Region	Certification	Certified units/sales
United States (RIAA)	Gold	500,000^{^}
^{^} Shipments figures based on certification alone.
