= Crucial Conflict =

American hip-hop group

- Origin: Chicago, Illinois, U.S.
- Genres: Midwestern hip-hop; gangsta rap
- Works: Crucial Conflict discography
- Years active: 1993–1999; 2007–present
- Labels: TCR&R Productions; Universal Records; Buckwild Records
- Members: Ralph "Wildstyle" Leverston; Wondosas "Kilo" Martin; Corey "Coldhard" Johnson; Marrico "Never" King; Haji "QBall" Mccollum
- Past members: Jiovannal "Lil Jeno" Gordon; Anthony "Smooth Lil T" Gordon

Crucial Conflict is an American hip hop group from Chicago, composed of Wondosas "Kilo" Martin, Ralph "Wildstyle" Leverston, Corey "Coldhard" Johnson and Marrico "Never" King, best known for their marijuana-themed 1996 hit single "Hay".

The group debuted with the seven-track extended play Crucial Times, released on TCR&R Productions in 1993 by the original lineup consisted of Kilo, Wildstyle, Lil Jeno and Smooth Lil T. The latter two were replaced by Coldhard and Never, and the group got signed with the Universal label in 1996 to release their debut full-length The Final Tic. The album was supported by singles and music videos for "Hay" and "Ride the Rodeo", and was certified gold by Recording Industry Association of America.

The group participated on Rhyme & Reason and Def Jam's How to Be a Player soundtracks, before dropping their sophomore Good Side, Bad Side in 1998 for Universal Records. The album featured guest appearances from Tear Da Club Up Thugs, Do or Die, R. Kelly and contains a couple of diss tracks towards Bone Thugs-n-Harmony. Crucial Conflict contributed on Tear da Club up Thugs' CrazyNDaLazDayz, Project Pat's Ghetty Green and Warren G's I Want It All, before they split in 1999, During the same year Crucial Conflict members Coldhard and Kilo, had cameo appearances on the music video Still D.R.E. by Dr. Dre and Snoop Dogg.

The group reunited in 2007 and, after ten years of label conflicts, returned with the third studio album, Planet Crucon, released in 2008 via Buckwild Records. Crucial Conflict were one of the overseas artists featured on Bulgarian rapper Big Sha's Хляб и амфети album, along with Drag-On.

New material failed to appear, but the group remained an active live act, including an appearance at the 2015 SXSW festival during Twista's Midwestern Artists Showcase.

== Discography ==
- Crucial Times (1993)
- The Final Tic (1996)
- Good Side, Bad Side (1998)
- Planet Crucon (2008)
- Ol'e (Single) (2019)
