= List of Whitney Houston live performances =

Whitney Houston live performances
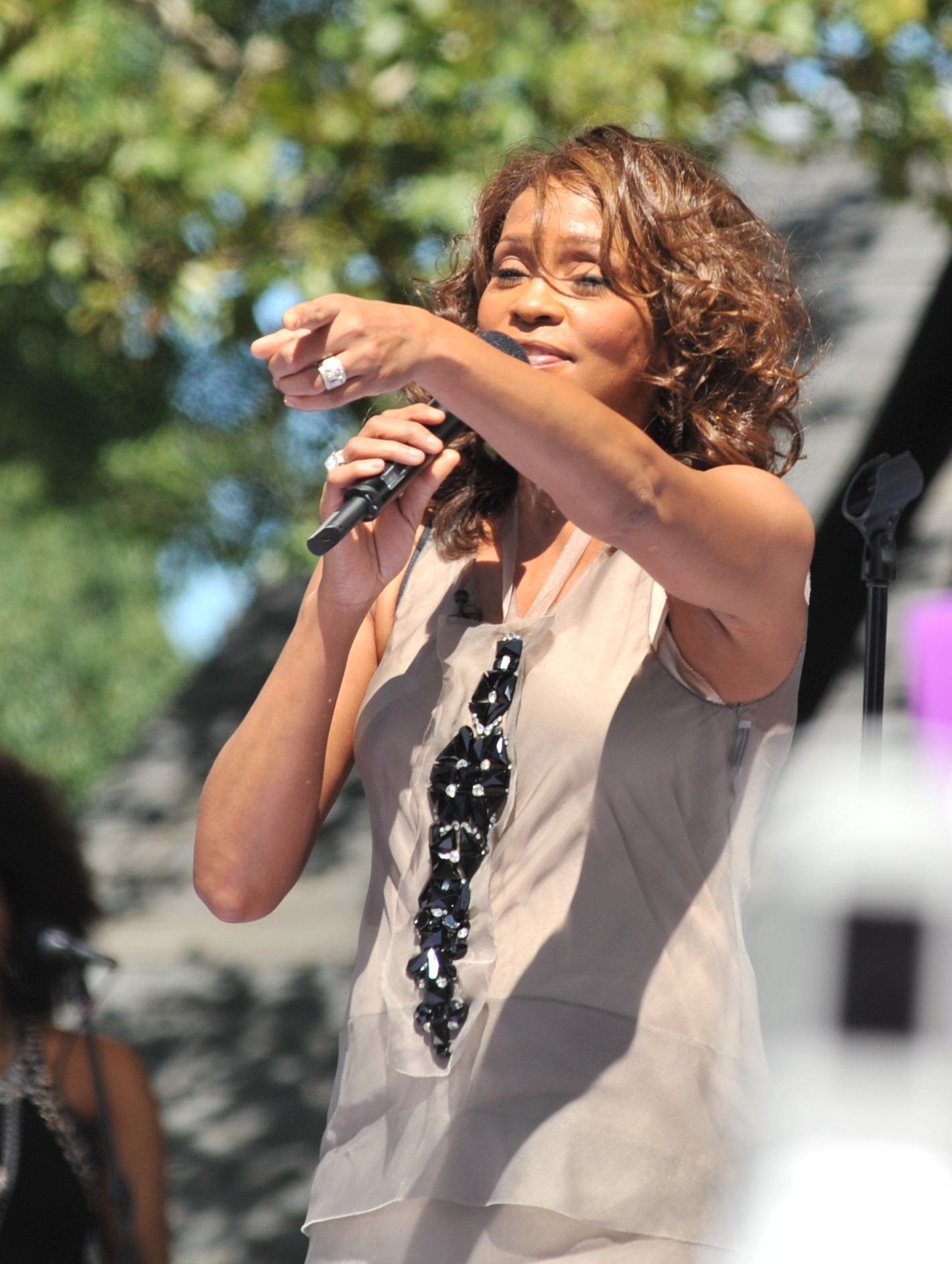
- Houston performing on Good Morning America in September 2009.
- Concert tours: 10
- One-off concerts: 16
- Benefit concerts: 12
- Music festivals: 5
- Award shows: 22

American vocalist and performer Whitney Houston, known as "The Voice", is one of the most significant cultural icons of the 20th century. She embarked on ten concert tours between the 1980s and the 2000s, including six world tours and four territorial tours. After performing as a successful opening act for singers Jeffrey Osborne and Luther Vandross on their respective 1985 US amphitheatre tours, and also having sung at various North American venues and festivals, Houston embarked on her worldwide debut, The Greatest Love Tour, in 1986. For the promotion of her globally-successful album Whitney (1987), Houston embarked on The Moment of Truth World Tour, which visited North America, Europe, Japan, Hong Kong and Australia from 1987 to 1988. In Europe, Houston visited 12 countries for the first time, singing for over half-a-million fans; the singer performed for nine consecutive nights at Wembley Arena in London. She then followed this success with a special, sold-out Japanese tour, the Feels So Right Japan Tour (1990) and the I'm Your Baby Tonight World Tour (1991).

After starring with Kevin Costner in the enormously successful film The Bodyguard (1992) and singing on its multi-platinum accompanying soundtrack, and receiving global accolades for the smash hit "I Will Always Love You"—originally written and performed by Dolly Parton—Houston went on her most ambitious world tour, at that point, The Bodyguard World Tour (1993–1994). Spanning two years, the tour took Houston throughout North America twice, as well as back to Europe and Japan, in addition to her very first shows in South America and South Africa. In 1997, she embarked on The Pacific Rim Tour, during which she performed for the first time in Thailand and Taiwan. In 1999, following the success of her first studio album in eight years, My Love Is Your Love (1998), Houston embarked on her first world tour in five years to promote the album. The My Love Is Your Love World Tour was the highest-grossing European arena tour for that year, playing to almost half-a-million people. In 2009, Houston embarked on the Nothing but Love World Tour, her first tour in over 10 years, at the time, in support her seventh and final studio album, I Look to You (2009).

Throughout her career, Houston also made appearances at various charity concerts, and had her own televised specials, such as Freedomfest: Nelson Mandela's 70th Birthday Celebration (1988), A Benefit Concert for The United Negro College Fund (1988), That's What Friends Are For: AIDS Benefit Concert (1990), Welcome Home Heroes with Whitney Houston (1991) and Classic Whitney: Live from Washington, D.C. (1997).

== Concert tours ==
=== World tours ===
Title	Date	Associated album(s)	Continent(s)	Shows	Gross	Attendance
The Greatest Love World Tour	July 26 – December 1, 1986	Whitney Houston	North America; Europe; Asia; Oceania	54	$4,830,072 (USA)	285,066
The Greatest Love World Tour setlist: 1. "Instrumental Intro" (contains elements of "Also sprach Zarathustra" and excerpts from "Greatest Love of All"); 2. "Wanna Be Startin' Somethin'"; 3. "Eternal Love"; 4. "You Give Good Love"; 5. "Hold Me" (duet with Gary Houston); 6. "How Will I Know"; 7. "Take Good Care of My Heart" (duet with Gary Houston); 8. "Nobody Loves Me Like You Do" (duet with Gary Houston); 9. "Saving All My Love for You"; 10. "Someone for Me"; 11. "I Am Changing"; 12. "Heart to Heart"; 13. "Didn't We Almost Have It All"; 14. "I Wanna Dance with Somebody (Who Loves Me)"; 15. "He, I Believe"; 16. "Greatest Love of All"
Moment of Truth World Tour	July 4, 1987 – November 21, 1988	Whitney	North America; Europe; Asia; Oceania	157	$21,000,000 (USA)	900,419
Moment of Truth World Tour setlist: 1. Instrumental Intro (contain elements of "How Will I Know, "Saving All My Love for You" and "You Give Good Love"); 2. "Let the Feeling Flow"; 3. "How Will I Know"; 4. "You Give Good Love"; 5. "Love Is a Contact Sport"; 6. "Just the Lonely Talking Again"; 7. "Love Will Save the Day"; 8. "Saving All My Love for You"; 9. "For the Love of You" (contain elements of "Never Too Much"); 10. "He, I Believe"; 11. "Didn't We Almost Have It All"; 12. Medley: "Sweet Love" / "Control" / "Stop to Love"; 13. "I Wanna Dance with Somebody (Who Loves Me)"; 14. "Greatest Love of All"
I'm Your Baby Tonight World Tour	March 14 – October 2, 1991	I'm Your Baby Tonight	Asia; North America; Europe	97	—N/a	—N/a
I'm Your Baby Tonight World Tour setlist: 1. "I Wanna Dance with Somebody (Who Loves Me)"; 2. "So Emotional"; 3. "Saving All My Love for You"; 4. "How Will I Know"; 5. "All at Once" / "A House Is Not a Home" / "Didn't We Almost Have It All" / "Where Do Broken Hearts Go"; 6. "Billie Holiday Medley: Lover Man (Oh, Where Can You Be?)" / "My Man"; 7. "All the Man That I Need"; 8. "My Name Is Not Susan"; 9. "Anymore"; 10. "Revelation" (contain excerpts of "He's Got the Whole World in His Hands" and "He's All Right"); 11. "Miracle"; 12. "Who Do You Love"; 13. "I'm Your Baby Tonight"; 14. "Greatest Love of All"
The Bodyguard World Tour	July 5, 1993 – November 19, 1994	The Bodyguard	North America; Europe; Asia; South America; Africa	120	$14,000,000 (USA)	698,672
The Bodyguard World Tour setlist: 1. "The Greatest Love of All" (Instrumental Sequence); 2. "Love Will Save the Day"; 3. "Saving All My Love for You"; 4. "You Give Good Love"; 5. "How Will I Know"; 6. "I Wanna Dance with Somebody (Who Loves Me)"; 7. Medley: "I Loves You Porgy" / "And I Am Telling You I'm Not Going"; 8. "I Have Nothing"; 9. "Queen of the Night"; 10. "I'm Your Baby Tonight"; 11. Medley: "All at Once" / "Nobody Loves Me Like You Do" / "Didn't We Almost Have It All" / "Where Do Broken Hearts Go" / "All the Man That I Need"; 12. "Jesus Loves Me"; 13. "Wonderful Counselor"; 14. Aretha Franklin medley: "(You Make Me Feel Like A) Natural Woman" / "Do Right Woman, Do Right Man" / "Ain't No Way"; 15. "You Send Me"; 16. "I Will Always Love You"; 17. "I'm Every Woman"
My Love Is Your Love World Tour	June 22 – November 8, 1999	My Love Is Your Love	North America; Europe	66	$5,988,882 (USA)	—N/a
My Love Is Your Love World Tour setlist: 1. "Get It Back"; 2. "Heartbreak Hotel" (contain elements of "This Place Hotel"); 3. "If I Told You That"; 4. "Saving All My Love for You" / "Until You Come Back"; 5. "Oh Yes"; 6. "I Learned from the Best"; 7. "Step by Step"; 8. "Change the World" (performed by Gary Houston); 9. Medley Reprise: "I Have Nothing" / "I'm Your Baby Tonight" / "Run to You" / "Queen of the Night" (performed by backing vocalists); 10. "My Love Is Your Love" (contains elements of "My Love Is Your Love (Salaam Remix)"); 11. "I'm Every Woman"; 12. "I Wanna Dance with Somebody (Who Loves Me)"; 13. "How Will I Know"; 14. "In My Business"; 15. "Jesus Loves Me"; 16. "I Love the Lord"; 17. "I Go to the Rock"; 18. "I Believe in You and Me" / "Why Does It Hurt So Bad" / "It Hurts Like Hell" (contain elements from "The Glory of Love"); 19. "I Will Always Love You"; 20. "It's Not Right but It's Okay"
Nothing but Love World Tour	December 9, 2009 – June 17, 2010	I Look to You	Asia; Australia; Europe	48	$36,300,000	86,683
Nothing but Love World Tour setlist: 1. "Video Sequence" (contain elements of "For the Lovers", "Queen of the Night" "I'm Every Woman" and "How Will I Know"); 2. "For the Lovers"; 3. "Nothin' But Love"; 4. "I Look to You"; 5. "My Love Is Your Love"; 6. "It's Not Right but It's Okay" (contain excerpts from "Like I Never Left"); 7. "Step By Step"; 8. "For the Love of You" (performed by Gary Houston); 9. "Queen of the Night" (performed by backing vocalists); 10. "A Song for You" (contain excerpts from "The Way You Make Me Feel"); 11. "Saving All My Love for You" / "Greatest Love of All" / "All at Once" / "I Learned from the Best"; 12. "I Love the Lord"; 13. "I Will Always Love You"; 14. "I Wanna Dance with Somebody (Who Loves Me)"; 15. "How Will I Know"; 16. "I Didn't Know My Own Strength"; 17. "Million Dollar Bill" (Freemasons Radio Edit)

=== Regional tours ===
Title	Date	Associated album(s)	Location(s)	Shows
US Tour	June 3 – December 1, 1985	Whitney Houston	United States	59
US Summer Tour setlist: 1. "Greatest Love of All"; 2. "Love Will Find a Way"; 3. "Someone for Me"; 4. "You Give Good Love"; 5. "Thinking About You"; 6. "Nobody Loves Me Like You Do" (duet with Gary Houston); 7. "How Will I Know"; 8. "Saving All My Love for You"; 9. "I Am Changing"; 10. "Home"
Feels So Right Tour	January 1 – 24, 1990		Japan	14
Feels So Right Tour setlist: 1. "Overture 1990"; 2. "So Emotional"; 3. "You Give Good Love"; 4. "Saving All My Love for You"; 5. "How Will I Know"; 6. Medley: "All at Once" / "A House Is Not a Home" / "Didn't We Almost Have It All" / "Where Do Broken Hearts Go"; 7. "Takin' a Chance"; 8. "The Giver of Life; 9. "Wonderful Counselor"; 10. "All the Man That I Need"; 11. "Who Do You Love"; 12. "I Wanna Dance with Somebody (Who Loves Me)"; 13. "Greatest Love of All"; 14. "Higher Love"
Pacific Rim Tour	May 5 – 29, 1997	The Preacher's Wife	Japan; Taiwan; Thailand; Australia; United States	9
Pacific Rim Tour setlist: 1. "I'm Every Woman"; 2. "So Emotional"; 3. "I Wanna Dance with Somebody (Who Loves Me)"; 4. Medley: "All at Once" / "Saving All My Love for You" / "Greatest Love of All"; 5. "Queen of the Night"; 6. "Change the World" (performed by Gary Houston); 7. "My Name Is Not Susan"; 8. "All the Man That I Need"; 9. "A Song for You" (performed by Bobby Brown); 10. "Exhale (Shoop Shoop)"; 11. "I Love the Lord"; 12. "I Go to the Rock"; 13. "I Will Always Love You"; 14. "Step by Step"
The European Tour	June 20 – July 11, 1998		Europe	10
The European Tour setlist: 1. "I'm Every Woman"; 2. "So Emotional"; 3. "All the Man That I Need"; 4. "I Wanna Dance with Somebody (Who Loves Me)"; 5. Medley: "Saving All My Love for You" / "Nobody Loves Me Like You Do" / "Didn't We Almost Have It All" / "Where Do Broken Hearts Go"; 6. "Queen of the Night"; 7. "Change the World" (performed by Gary Houston); 8. Diana Ross Medley: "I'm Coming Out" / "Endless Love" (with Gary Houston) / "Ain't No Mountain High Enough" / "The Boss"; 9. "I Love the Lord"; 10. "I Go to the Rock"; 11. "I Will Always Love You"; 12. "Step by Step"
Soul Divas Tour	July 7 – 28, 2004	—N/a	Germany; Thailand; China	7
Soul Divas Tour setlist: 1. "If I Told You That"; 2. "Get It Back"; 3. "You Light Up My Life"; 4. Medley: "Saving All My Love for You" / "The Greatest Love of All" / "All at Once" / "You Give Good Love"; 5. "Superstar" / "Never Too Much" (Tribute to Luther Vandross); 6. "Step by Step"; 7. Medley: "Heartbreak Hotel" / "It's Not Right But It's Okay"; 8. "My Love Is Your Love"; 9. "I Go to the Rock"; 10. "I Wanna Dance With Somebody (Who Loves Me)"; 11. "How Will I Know"; 12. "I Will Always Love You"; 13. "I'm Every Woman"

== Benefit concerts ==
Date	Event	City	Performed song(s)
January 2, 1986	An All-Star Celebration Honoring Martin Luther King Jr.	New York City	"Ain't No Mountain High Enough" (with Ashford & Simpson and Al Jarreau)
July 4, 1986	Liberty Weekend: Americana Concert	New York City	"Greatest Love of All" (with the Boston Pops Orchestra conducted by John Williams); "America the Beautiful" (with the other guests)
June 11, 1988	Freedomfest: Nelson Mandela 70th Birthday Celebration	London	"Didn't We Almost Have It All"; "Love Will Save the Day"; "So Emotional"; "Where Do Broken Hearts Go"; "How Will I Know"; "He / I Believe" (with Cissy Houston); "I Wanna Dance with Somebody (Who Loves Me)"; "Greatest Love of All"
August 28, 1988	United Negro College Fund Benefit Concert	New York City	"Didn't We Almost Have It All; "Love Will Save the Day"; "You Give Good Love"; "So Emotional"; "Where Do Broken Hearts Go"; "Love Is a Contact Sport"; "How Will I Know"; "Saving All My Love for You"; "He / I Believe"; "Wonderful Counselor"; "(You Make Me Feel Like) A Natural Woman"; "You Send Me"; "When I First Saw You / Family" (with Cissy Houston and Gary Houston); "Greatest Love of All"; "I Wanna Dance with Somebody (Who Loves Me)"
March 17, 1990	That's What Friends Are For: Arista Records 15th Anniversary AIDS Benefit Concert	New York City	"I Wanna Dance with Somebody (Who Loves Me)"; "Greatest Love of All"; "That's What Friends Are For" (with Dionne Warwick and the other guests)
March 31, 1991	Welcome Home Heroes with Whitney Houston	Norfolk	"The Star-Spangled Banner"; "I Wanna Dance with Somebody (Who Loves Me)"; "Saving All My Love for You"; "How Will I Know"; "Didn't We Almost Have It All" / "A House Is Not a Home" / "Where Do Broken Hearts Go"; "All the Man That I Need"; "One Moment in Time" (Instrumental); "My Name Is Not Susan"; "Anymore"; "A Song for You"; "Revelation"; "Who Do You Love"; "I'm Your Baby Tonight"; "Greatest Love of All"; "The Battle Hymn of the Republic"
May 12, 1991	The Simple Truth: A Concert for Kurdish Refugees	London	"My Name Is Not Susan"; "Miracle"; "Greatest Love of All" (live from Oakland, California)
January 27, 1994	Commitment To Life VII	Los Angeles	"Don't Cry"
April 9, 1994	4th Annual Rainforest Foundation Concert	New York City	"If It's Magic"; "I Will Always Love You"; "La donna è mobile" (with Luciano Pavarotti, Elton John and Sting)
November 12, 1994	Whitney: The Concert for a New South Africa	Johannesburg	"Love's In Need of Love Today"; "So Emotional"; "Saving All My Love for You"; "I Wanna Dance with Somebody (Who Loves Me)"; "How Will I Know"; "I Love You" / * "All at Once" / "Where You Are"; "Lover for Life"; "My Name Is Not Susan"; "Queen of the Night"; "I Have Nothing"; "Touch the World" (performed with Cissy Houston and TU NOKWE'S AMAJIKA PERFORMING ARTS choir); "Love Is"; "Amazing Grace"; "Master Blaster (Jammin')"; "I Will Always Love You"; "I'm Every Woman"; "Greatest Love of All"; "Home"; "I'm Every Woman" (Reprise)
October 3 & 5, 1997	Classic Whitney: Live from Washington, D.C.	Washington, D.C.	"I Will Always Love You"; "I Know Him So Well" (with Cissy Houston); "Walk On By" / "A House Is Not a Home" / "I Say a Little Prayer" / "Alfie"; "Baby I Love You" / "(Sweet Sweet Baby) Since You've Been Gone" / "Ain't No Way"; "Mr. Bojangles" (feat. dance solo by Bobby Brown); "Abraham, Martin and John"; "God Bless the Child" / "Endless Love" (with Gary Houston) / "Ain't No Mountain High Enough" / "The Boss" / "Missing You"; "I Loves You, Porgy" / "Porgy, I's Your Woman Now" / "Summertime"; "Exhale (Shoop Shoop)"; "I Love the Lord"; "I Go to the Rock"; "The Greatest Love of All"; "Amazing Grace" (saxophone solo by Kirk Whalum); "Step By Step"; "I'm Every Woman"
July 11, 1998	UNICEF Summer Open Air Festival '98	Aschaffenburg	"I'm Every Woman"; "So Emotional"; "All the Man That I Need"; "I Wanna Dance with Somebody (Who Loves Me)"; "Saving All My Love for You" / "Nobody Loves Me Like You Do" / "Didn't We Almost Have It All" / "Where Do Broken Hearts Go"; "Queen of the Night"; "Change the World"; "I'm Coming Out" / "Endless Love" / "Ain't No Mountain High Enough" / "The Boss"; "I Love the Lord"; "I Go to the Rock"; "I Will Always Love You"; "Step by Step"

== Other notable appearances ==
Date	Show title	Details
June 23, 1983	The Merv Griffin Show	Arista Records founder, Clive Davis introduced Whitney Houston to the world on this show for her first TV performance.; She performed "Home" from The Wiz and also sang a medley of soul classics, Aretha's "(Sweet Sweet Baby) Since You've Been Gone", "Ain't No Way" and Sam Cooke's "You Send Me", with her mother Cissy Houston.
April 5, 1986	Champs-Elysées (French TV Talk-Show)	Whitney Houston met France's Serge Gainsbourg on this live talk-show, which was then the most watched Saturday evening show in France.; An incident after the performance where Gainsbourg made a crude comment about Houston was listed at No. 41 in NME's "Top 100 Rock Moments of All Time" in 2001 and No. 48 in VH1's "100 Most Outrageous Celebrity Moments" in 2004.
February 7, 1987	Sanremo Music Festival	Whitney was the international guest at the finale of the most popular Italian contest and awards. Her live performance of All at Once got a huge standing ovation and the audience asked her for the encore, the request was immediately satisfied. That was the first encore requested in the history of the contest.
May 15, 1987	The 27th Montreux Golden Rose Rock Festival; IM&MC Gala	Set list; "How Will I Know; "Where Do Broken Hearts Go; "I Wanna Dance with Somebody (Who Loves Me)"
July 31, 1987	The Special Olympics World Summer Games Opening Ceremonies	It was held at the University of Notre Dame in Notre Dame, Indiana.; She performed "Love Will Save the Day", "Didn't We Almost Have It All" and also joined "Winners All", which was dedicated to The Special Olympics, with Barbara Mandrell, Marvin Hamlisch, John Denver at finale.; "Love Will Save the Day" performance was used as its music video later.; In 1988, she won Emmy Award for Outstanding Musical Performance in a Sports Program for the performance in this event.
November 13, 1989	Sammy Davis Jr.'s 60th Anniversary Celebration in Show Business	She performed "One Moment in Time".
January 27, 1991	Super Bowl XXV	Whitney Houston performed "The Star-Spangled Banner" before the Super Bowl XXV, played at Tampa Stadium in Tampa, Florida, on January 27, 1991. A single of the performance was later released.; The single was reissued on September 27, 2001, as a charity CD single after the September 11, attacks on the World Trade Center and The Pentagon and has been certified platinum for U.S. sales in excess of 1 million copies by RIAA.; Whitney Houston, The Whitney Houston Foundation For Children, Inc. and Arista Records donated their royalties and net proceeds from the sale of re-released single to New York Fraternal Order Of Police and The New York Firefighters 9/11 Disaster Relief Fund.; The single released in 1991, reached No. 20 on Billboard Hot 100 Singles Chart; making her second artist to turn the national anthem into a pop hit of that magnitude since José Feliciano's version has reached No. 50 in 1968 and re-released single in 2001, peaked No. 6 on the Hot 100 chart; becoming easily the biggest hit version ever of "The Star-Spangled Banner".; In 2003, this performance listed No. 12 in VH1 and TV Guide's "100 Moments That Rocked TV" and ranked No. 1 in "25 Most Memorable Music Moments in NFL History" to be featured in Rolling Stone.
June 23, 1991	Coca-Cola Pop Music Backstage Pass to Summer	A Fox's TV special hosted by Cher, which previewed the Summer 1991 music scene.; It was aired to Whitney's "I'm Your Baby Tonight" live performance at Greensboro Coliseum on June 16, during I'm Your Baby Tonight World Tour.
February 16, 1992	Muhammad Ali's 50th Birthday Celebration	This event was taped at the Wiltern Theater in Los Angeles on February 16, 1992, aired on ABC on March 1, 1992.; She dedicated "Greatest Love of All" to Muhammad Ali, which was the theme of 1977 film The Greatest about the life of him and later joined "You've Got a Friend" with Diana Ross & other celebrities at the end of the show.
May 6, 1992	Whitney Houston: This Is My Life	It was her first hourlong TV special aired on ABC on May 6, 1992.; This special included eight edited live performances in A Coruña, Spain during I'm Your Baby Tonight World Tour on September 29, 1991, as well as her two live performances during rehearsals for that tour, "This Day" and "Greatest Love of All".; She talked about her musical and personal life with behind-the-scenes view of world tour. Her co-star, Kevin Costner in the movie The Bodyguard, her parents Cissy Houston and John Houston appeared to talk about Whitney Houston.
July 17, 1994	1994 FIFA World Cup Closing Ceremonies	The 1994 FIFA World Cup Final took place at the Rose Bowl in Pasadena, California, on July 17, 1994.; Whitney Houston arrived on the playing field with the legendary Brazilian soccer player Pelé and performed six songs for 25 minutes with support from several thousand dancers, flag bearers, and musicians during closing ceremony before the final game, Brazil Vs. Italy.; Set list: "I Wanna Dance with Somebody (Who Loves Me)"; "How Will I Know"; "I Will Always Love You"; "I'm Every Woman"; "So Emotional"; "Greatest Love of All"
June 22, 1995	VH-1 Honors	The Whitney Houston Foundation For Children Inc. was awarded a VH1 Honor for its charitable work.; She performed "This Day" and spectacular duet "Bridge Over Troubled Water" with CeCe Winans.; At the opening of the event, she performed "My Guy" in a duet with Smokey Robinson during Smokey Robinson tribute medley, followed by "The Way You Do the Things You Do" and "Get Ready" with Boyz II Men, Wynonna and Vince Gill.
August 24, 1996	Whitney: Brunei The Royal Wedding Celebration	Whitney did a private gig, for the wedding of Princess Rashidah, the eldest daughter of the Sultan of Brunei, Hassanal Bolkiah, at Jerudong Park Garden on August 24, 1996.; Setlist was almost the same as The Bodyguard World Tour except encore song was "Exhale (Shoop Shoop)".; She was reportedly paid $7 million to perform for this event. Media stories on the Brunei royal family indicated that Prince Jefri gave Houston a blank check for the event and instructed her to fill it out for what she felt she was worth.
November 28, 1996 (Air date)	Celebrate the Dream: 50 Years of Ebony	It was a two-hour-long event featuring America's biggest stars, looking back, remembering and celebrating the past 50 years and the Ebony Magazine that chronicled it.; Whitney Houston & the Georgia Mass Choir kick off the celebration with a soul-stirring medley of "I Love the Lord" and "Joy to the World".; It was aired on ABC, November 28, 1996.
August 25, 1997	The 1997 U.S. Open Tennis Championships: the Arthur Ashe Stadium Inauguration Ceremonies	It was the special event to celebrate opening a new stadium which was named after former tennis player Arthur Ashe.; While the past US Open tennis champions appeared on screen, she dedicated "One Moment in Time" to the legendary tennis players and about 23,000 audience.
April 13, 1999	VH1 Divas Live '99	Whitney Houston, Tina Turner, Cher, Brandy and Faith Hill top the bill for this concert special staged by VH1 which pays tribute to the women of pop music.; The show benefited VH1 Save the Music, a pro-social initiative that supports music education in public schools.; The all-star concert, broadcast live on VH1 from the Beacon Theatre in New York on April 13, became the highest-rated single broadcast in VH1 history.; Whitney performed 5 songs then, but "It's Not Right But It's Okay" and "My Love Is Your Love" not included on CD which was released on November 2, 1999, and DVD released on April 4, 2000.; Set list: "It's Not Right But It's Okay"; "Ain't No Way (with Mary J. Blige); "My Love Is Your Love" (featuring Treach by Naughty by Nature); "I Will Always Love You"; "I'm Every Woman" (with Chaka Khan); "I'm Every Woman" (reprise) (with Mary J. Blige, Brandy, Faith Hill, Chaka Khan and LeAnn Rimes)
April 10, 2000	25 Years of No. 1 Hits: Arista Records' Anniversary Celebration	The special was taped at the Shrine Auditorium in Los Angeles on April 10 and aired on NBC on May 15.; It was released on VHS & DVD which had the same title as the show, on June 6, 2000.; Set list: "I Wanna Dance with Somebody (Who Loves Me)" / "How Will I Know"; "I Believe in You and Me"; "I Will Always Love You"; "My Love Is Your Love" (with Monica, Deborah Cox, Angie Stone Faith Evans and Bobby Brown)
September 7, 2001	Michael Jackson: 30th Anniversary Celebration, The Solo Years	To salute the success of Michael Jackson's solo career for 30 years, these events were held at Madison Square Garden in New York City on September 7 and 10, 2001 and aired on CBS on November 13, 2001.; Whitney Houston participated at first concert and performed "Wanna Be Startin' Somethin'" with Usher & Mýa at the opening of the show.
May 23, 2002	VH1 Divas Las Vegas: A Concert to Benefit the VH1 Save the Music Foundation	The fifth VH1 Divas Live concert was aired live from the MGM Grand Garden Arena in Las Vegas on May 23, 2002.; Whitney briefly joined Mary J. Blige's "Rainy Dayz" for the song's ending, but that performance was not included on CD & DVD, released on October 22, 2002.
May 22, 2003	VH1 Divas Duets: A Concert to Benefit the VH1 Save the Music Foundation	This Divas Live special was aired live from the MGM Grand Garden Arena in Las Vegas on May 22, 2003.
April 27, 2008	The 4th Annual Plymouth Jazz Festival Tobago	Whitney Houston performed during Day-3 of "The 4th Annual Plymouth Jazz Festival Tobago" at Plymouth Recreational Grounds in Tobago, West Indies.; Delivering only seven songs during her 30 minutes set, Houston was reportedly paid $3 million for the show.; Setlist: "It's Not Right But It's Okay"; "Step by Step"; "Saving All My Love for You"; "My Love Is Your Love"; "If I Told You That"; "I Will Always Love You"; "I'm Every Woman"
May 24, 2008	The 7th Annual Mawazine World Rhythms Festival	The festival took place from May 16 to 24, 2008 in Morocco's capital city, Rabat and featured artists from forty countries in more than 100 musical performances.; Whitney performed during the festival's closing ceremony at Hay Nahda stadium on May 24, 2008.
January 30, 2011	BET's Celebration of Gospel	Whitney made a surprise appearance at the show singing her hit "I Look to You" with Kim Burrell, who had sung the first verse prior to Houston's appearance, which led to an immediate standing ovation; Houston and Burrell's performance ends with resounding cheers from the audience. It becomes Houston's final television performance before her death a year later.

== Performances at award shows ==
=== 1980s ===
Year	Date	Venue	Award shows	Performance(s) / Details
1986	January 27	Shrine Auditorium	The 13th American Music Awards	"How Will I Know"
1986	February 25	Shrine Auditorium	The 28th Grammy Awards	"Saving All My Love for You"
1986	September 5	Universal Amphitheatre	The 3rd MTV Video Music Awards	"How Will I Know" / "Greatest Love of All"
1987	January 26	Shrine Auditorium	The 14th American Music Awards	"All at Once"
1987	February 7	Teatro Ariston (Sanremo)	The 37th Festival di Sanremo	"All at Once" (She was a guest performer and sang this song twice for audience's encore.)
1987	February 9	Grosvenor House Hotel (London)	1987 BRIT Awards	"How Will I Know"
1987	February 24	Shrine Auditorium	The 29th Grammy Awards	Whitney performed "Greatest Love of All" nominated for "Record of the Year" and later joined in the show's finale performance, "Stand by Me" with Ben E. King, Mick Hucknall of Simply Red and Luther Vandross.
1987	March 23	Santa Monica Civic Auditorium	The 1st Soul Train Music Awards	"You Give Good Love"; "That's What Friends Are For" (with Dionne Warwick, Stevie Wonder & Luther Vandross)
1987	September 11	Universal Amphitheatre	The 4th MTV Video Music Awards	"I Wanna Dance with Somebody (Who Loves Me)" / "Didn't We Almost Have It All" (This performance broadcast via satellite from her Saratoga Springs concert.)
1988	January 25	Shrine Auditorium	The 15th American Music Awards	"Where Do Broken Hearts Go"; "Wonderful Counselor" (with Cissy Houston & Gary Houston)
1988	March 2	Radio City Music Hall	The 30th Grammy Awards	"I Wanna Dance with Somebody (Who Loves Me)"
1988	March 10	Sheraton Centre	The 44th Anniversary; Of The United Negro College Fund	Whitney performed at a United Negro College Fund Awards gala saluting her musical friend, superstar Michael Jackson who received The Frederick D. Patterson Award in this ceremony.; She sang "Lift Every Voice and Sing" known as the Black national anthem, but forgot words halfway through it, which was shown on ET. Also sang "America the Beautiful".
1988	December 10 (Air date: January 14, 1989)	Wiltern Theater	The 21st NAACP Image Awards	"Hold Up the Light" (with BeBe & CeCe Winans)
1989	February 22	Shrine Auditorium	The 31st Grammy Awards	"One Moment in Time"

=== 1990s ===
Year	Date	Venue	Award shows	Performance(s) / Details
1991	December 9	Universal Amphitheatre	The 2nd Billboard Music Awards	"Lover Man", "My Man" & "All the Man That I Need" Medley
1992	January 27	Shrine Auditorium	The 19th American Music Awards	"I'm Your Baby Tonight", "My Name Is Not Susan" & "Who Do You Love" Remix Medley
1992	April 10 (Air date: May 29)	Paramount Theater at Madison Square Garden	The 5th Essence Awards	It was an awards special honoring the lives and achievements of eight African-American women who have made significant contributions in their respective fields.; For the first time, the ceremonies broadcast in prime time by CBS on May 29, 1992.; Whitney Houston appeared to honor Nancy Wilson with "Essence Award" and later returned to perform "It's Time" with The Winans, BeBe & CeCe Winans, Regina Belle & Kid 'n Play at the end of the show.
1993	March 29	Dorothy Chandler Pavilion	The 65th Academy Awards	When "Run to You" and "I Have Nothing" from The Bodyguard Soundtrack were nominated for Best Original Song, Whitney had an opportunity to perform these songs but she couldn't attend the show because she had given a birth to a daughter on March 4.; On behalf of her, Natalie Cole performed two nominated songs.
1993	December 8	Universal Amphitheatre	The 4th Billboard Music Awards	"I Have Nothing"
1994	January 5	Pasadena Civic Auditorium	The 26th NAACP Image Awards	Whitney was honored as "Entertainer of the Year" and received 4 awards more including "Outstanding Female Artist" in that evening.; Right before she accepted the award for "Entertainer of the Year", Denzel Washington paid tribute to Whitney Houston for her outstanding career 'til then with video presentation and introduced her mother, Cissy Houston and brother, Gary Houston who performed "Amazing Grace".; When she received the award for "Outstanding Soundtrack Album: Film or T.V." and made an acceptance speech, sang a snippet of "Jesus Loves Me" for audience's request.
1994	February 7	Shrine Auditorium	The 21st American Music Awards	"I Love You Porgy", "And I Am Telling You I'm Not Going" & "I Have Nothing" Medley
1994	March 1	Radio City Music Hall	The 36th Grammy Awards	"I Will Always Love You"
1994	March 15	Shrine Auditorium	The 8th Soul Train Music Awards	"Queen of the Night" intro & "I'm Every Woman"; "Something in Common" (with Bobby Brown)
1994	May 4	Monte Carlo Sporting Club (Monte Carlo)	The 6th World Music Awards	Houston scooped up five accolades, including best-selling female artist worldwide, and sang "I Will Always Love You" being introduced by Albert, Prince of Monaco.; The show host, Patrick Swayze danced with his wife, Lisa Niemi to the song "All the Man That I Need" as a salute to multiple award winner Whitney Houston.
1995	May 20	Barker Hangar	The 8th Kids' Choice Awards	"I'm Every Woman" (This was lip-sync performance.)
1996	February 28	Shrine Auditorium	The 38th Grammy Awards	Gospel Medley: "I Surrender All" (performed by CeCe Winans); "Count On Me" (with CeCe Winans); "Heaven" (with Shirley Caesar & CeCe Winans)
1996	June 8	Walt Disney Studios	The 5th MTV Movie Awards	"Why Does It Hurt So Bad"
1996	September 13	BET Studios	The 2nd BET Walk of Fame	Whitney Houston was the recipient of BET's the second "Walk Of Fame" award – created in 1995 to "recognize the significant contribution of African-Americans in the entertainment industry."; She received the laurel at the network's United Negro College Fund gala Benefit September 13 at BET Studios in Washington, D.C.; She performed "Exhale (Shoop Shoop)", "Alfie", "I Will Always Love You", "I'm Every Woman", "Greatest Love of All" and sang "Happy Birthday Daddy" for her father, John Houston.
1997	February 26	Madison Square Garden	The 39th Grammy Awards	Waiting to Exhale Soundtrack Medley: "Sittin' Up in My Room" (performed by Brandy); "Not Gon' Cry" (performed by Mary J. Blige); "Exhale (Shoop Shoop)" (performed by Whitney Houston); "Count On Me" (performed by Whitney Houston & CeCe Winans. Later all-stars, Aretha Franklin, Chaka Khan, Mary J. Blige & Brandy, joined in medley's finale.)
1997	April 4	The Theater at Madison Square Garden	The 10th Essence Awards	Whitney Houston has been selected to receive the first ever the Triumphant Spirit Award at the 10th annual Essence Awards. Houston was honored for her many philanthropic projects, including a foundation for homeless children suffering from AIDS and cancer. Essence magazine-sponsored event, which aired May 22 on Fox TV.; But because of an unexpected her absence at the ceremony, then presenter, Quincy Jones made her excuses and Cissy Houston accepted the award on behalf of her daughter.; Before Cissy Houston accepted the award, there was a musical tribute to Whitney Houston – "I Believe in You and Me" performed by CeCe Winans and "I Have Nothing" by Patti LaBelle.
1998	February 27	Shrine Auditorium	The 12th Soul Train Music Awards	Whitney Houston accepted a special award, "Quincy Jones Award for Outstanding Career Achievements in the field of entertainment" by Whoopi Goldberg and the presentation incorporated a short videography of Whitney's career to date.; It was followed by a tribute performance by Ron Isley, Terry Ellis, Kenny Lattimore and Monica who sang "Exhale (Shoop Shoop)", "I Believe in You and Me", "You Give Good Love" and "How Will I Know".
1998	April 10	The Theater at Madison Square Garden	The 11th Essence Awards	Whitney attended at the ceremony as presenter, to honor Patti LaBelle with Triumphant Spirit Award.; She sang a snippet of Patti's classic hit "If Only You Knew" before she paid tribute to Patti for her outstanding career with video presentation.
1998	April 23	Nashville Arena	The 29th Dove Awards	Houston delivered a soul-stirring rendition of "I Go to the Rock" at this awards. She won an award, Best Traditional Gospel Recorded Song of the Year, for the tune.
1998	December 7	MGM Grand Garden Arena	The 9th Billboard Music Awards	"Heartbreak Hotel" (featuring Faith Evans & Kelly Price)
1999	January 11	Shrine Auditorium	The 26th American Music Awards	"Until You Come Back" & "My Love Is Your Love" Medley (with Wyclef Jean & Babyface)
1999	February 16	London Arena (London)	The 19th BRIT Awards	"It's Not Right But It's Okay"
1999	March 21	Dorothy Chandler Pavilion	The 71st Academy Awards	"When You Believe" (with Mariah Carey")
1999	March 26	Shrine Auditorium	The 13th Soul Train Music Awards	"It's Not Right But It's Okay"; "So Amazing" (during Luther Vandross Tribute Medley)
1999	November 11	Point Depot (Dublin)	MTV Europe Music Awards 1999	"Get It Back" & "My Love Is Your Love" (Remix Version) Medley
1999	November 13	Stella Musical Theater (Berlin)	1999 Bambi Awards	"My Love Is Your Love" / "I Learned from the Best"
1999	December 2	Madison Square Garden	The Sports Illustrated — 20th Century Sports Awards	"You'll Never Stand Alone"

=== 2000s ===
Year	Date	Venue	Award shows	Performance(s) / Details
2000	February 23	Staples Center	The 42nd Grammy Awards	"It's Not Right But It's Okay" & "I Learned from the Best" Medley
2000	September 7	Radio City Music Hall	The 17th MTV Video Music Awards	Whitney Houston, introduced by Britney Spears and Christina Aguilera, appeared to present Video of the Year, singing a snippet of "I Will Always Love You".
2001	June 19	Paris Las Vegas Hotel	The 1st BET Awards	Whitney Houston received "BET Lifetime Achievement Award" at this award show.; Her video presentation was introduced by Mary J. Blige and Babyface, while Christina Aguilera and Luther Vandross followed singing "Run to You" and "All the Woman That I Need" respectively.; She performed "I Have Nothing" & "I Will Always Love You" medley right before receiving the award.
2002	November 14	Palau Sant Jordi (Barcelona)	MTV Europe Music Awards 2002	Whatchulookinat
2004	June 9 (Air date: June 12 on VOX, Germany)	CCH (Congress Centrum Hamburg) (Hamburg)	The 1st Women's World Awards	Whitney was presented "World Artist Award for Lifetime Achievement" was designed for women whose unique achievements have contributed to a better, more peaceful and humane society by former Soviet President Mikhail Gorbachev.; She briefly joined her cousin and fellow Lifetime Achievement Award winner, Dionne Warwick's "That's What Friends Are For" performance for closing the award show.
2004	September 15	Thomas & Mack Center	The 16th World Music Awards	"I Believe in You and Me" & "I Will Always Love You" Medley
2009	November 22	Nokia Theatre	The 37th American Music Awards	After actor and presenter, Samuel L. Jackson introduced Whitney Houston as the 7th name in a prestige list of "International Artist Of The Year Award" recipients with the video presentation for her achievements, she performed her powerhouse ballad "I Didn't Know My Own Strength" and received a standing ovation.; Houston's performance marked the first time she had performed on the show in ten years ("Until You Come Back" ans "My Love Is Your Love" medley with Babyface and Wyclef Jean in 1999) and her first primetime U.S. network performance in five years (World Music Awards in 2004).; Following her touching performance, the show honored Houston with the award, according to an inscription read by Samuel L. Jackson, which is given "in recognition of her worldwide success exemplified by her international record sales, radio airplay in countries all over the world, live performances that span the globe, and popularity that knows no borders or boundaries."

=== 2010s ===
Year	Date	Venue	Award shows	Performance(s) / Details
2010	January 16 (Air date: February 1 on BET)	The Warner Theatre	The 3rd BET Honors	The presenter Ne-Yo appeared on stage and introduced Houston's video presentation for her career in entertainment with short interview.; After video presentation, Houston received special tribute performances by Kim Burrell introduced as "one of Houston's favorite voices on the planet", and Jennifer Hudson. Burrell sang the jazzy version of Houston's rendition "I Believe in You and Me" and received a standing ovation. Hudson also brought the crowd to its feet singing Houston's chart-topping "I Will Always Love You", as she was presented with The BET Honor for Entertainment by Ne-Yo. Houston also sung a snippet of "I Love The Lord" during her speech.
