= Waiting to Exhale (soundtrack) =

1995 soundtrack album by various artists

Waiting to Exhale: Original Soundtrack Album

Soundtrack album by various artists
- Released: November 14, 1995
- Recorded: May–October 1995
- Genres: R&B; soul
- Length: 72:51
- Label: Arista
- Producer: Babyface

Singles from Waiting to Exhale: Original Soundtrack Album
- 1. "Exhale (Shoop Shoop)" Released: November 6, 1995; 2. "Sittin' Up in My Room" Released: December 12, 1995; 3. "Not Gon' Cry" Released: January 23, 1996; 4. "Count On Me" Released: March 4, 1996; 5. "Let It Flow" Released: May 21, 1996; 6. "It Hurts Like Hell" Released: June 24, 1996; 7. "Why Does It Hurt So Bad" Released: July 22, 1996

Waiting to Exhale: Original Soundtrack Album is the soundtrack for the film of the same name, released on November 14, 1995, by Arista Records. Produced by Babyface, the soundtrack features appearances by several prominent female R&B artists and groups, including Whitney Houston, Toni Braxton, TLC, Brandy, Aretha Franklin, Chaka Khan, Faith Evans, Patti LaBelle, SWV and Mary J. Blige.

The album remained at number one on the US Billboard 200 album chart for five weeks and Top R&B Albums chart for ten weeks, going 7× platinum, on September 4, 1996. It spawned two number-one hits on the US Billboard Hot 100 chart; "Exhale (Shoop Shoop)" and "Let It Flow", and three top-ten hits, "Sittin' Up in My Room", "Not Gon' Cry" and "Count on Me". "Exhale (Shoop Shoop)", "Let It Flow" and "Not Gon' Cry" also topped the R&B charts.

The album received a total of eleven Grammy nominations in 1997, including Album of the Year and Song of the Year for "Exhale (Shoop Shoop)". Three songs were nominated for Best Female R&B Vocal Performance. It won the Grammy for Best R&B Song for "Exhale (Shoop Shoop)", written by Babyface. The soundtrack has sold over twelve million copies worldwide. In 2024, the album was listed at number 27 on Rolling Stone's list of the greatest soundtracks of all time.

== Commercial performance ==
Waiting to Exhale Original Soundtrack Album entered on the Billboard 200 chart at number three and on the Top R&B/Hip-Hop Albums chart at number two respectively, the issue date of December 2, 1995, with 177,248 copies sold in its initial week. In its third week, the album reached number one on the Billboard Top R&B Albums chart, selling 200,000 copies, and stayed there for 10 non-consecutive weeks. It also topped the Billboard 200 chart in its 8th week, the issue date of January 20, 1996, with 231,000 units sold, and spent five consecutive weeks at number one. The album stayed for a total of 49 weeks and 70 weeks, on the Billboard 200 chart and the Top R&B Albums chart respectively. With this success on the charts and strong sales, it became 1996's "No. 1 Soundtrack Album" on the Billboard year-end charts and the "Best-selling Soundtrack Recording" by the National Association of Recording Merchandisers (NARM) in 1995–1996. The soundtrack album was certified 7× Platinum for shipping 7 million copies in the United States by the Recording Industry Association of America (RIAA) on September 4, 1996. According to the Nielsen SoundScan, as of 2009, it sold over 5,100,000 copies in the United States. The soundtrack has sold over twelve million copies worldwide.

== Critical reception ==
Professional ratings
Review scores
| Source | Rating |
|---|---|
| AllMusic | 4/5 stars |
| Cash Box | (positive) |
| Chicago Tribune | 2.5/4 stars |
| Robert Christgau | A− |
| Entertainment Weekly | B |
| Los Angeles Times | 2.5/4 stars |
| The New York Times | (positive) |
| The Rolling Stone Album Guide | 1/5 stars |
| Spin | (positive) |
| The Washington Post | (positive) |

Upon release, Waiting to Exhale Soundtrack received critical acclaim. Stephen Holden and Jon Pareles of the New York Times praised Babyface's ability as composer and producer, both choosing the album as one of the top 10 albums of 1995. Hoden described him as "the most creative pop-soul musician since the prime of Stevie Wonder", and commented, "he has created a suite of songs that evoke women's emotional and sexual fantasies with an astonishing sympathy, directness and expressive range." Pareles stated "Babyface gathers most of the sultriest female singers in current rhythm-and-blues and matches them with his own tender, gently pulsating songs. He uses understatement for seduction." Writing for New York Times on February 2, 1997, James Hunter called Waiting to Exhale Soundtrack "one of the commercial and artistic peaks of the new rhythm-and-blues." Geoffrey Himes, in an editorial review for Amazon.com, stated that the soundtrack album is "a fascinating song suite, [...] and one of the best middle-of-the-road-pop, adult-contemporary albums of the decade." Among its sixteen songs, he complimented "Not Gon' Cry" performed by Mary J. Blige especially, commenting "Babyface's music and lyrics suggest a woman barely holding back a swelling flood of anger and heartache, and Blige's brilliant vocal captures both the agitation and the restraint."

Josef Woodard of Entertainment Weekly gave the album a B, stating "Babyface shows an uncanny ability to blend Houston's pleasant, soft-edged commerciality with the sexually explicit and cutting-edge hip-hop of TLC. [...] The album goes down easy, just as you'd expect from a package framed by Whitney Houston tracks. Fittingly, the soundtrack waits to exhale, hovering in sensuous suspense." Jean Rosenbluth from Los Angeles Times noted Babyface's lyrics, saying "he has captured what it can mean to be a woman in 1995." In addition, she praised Whitney Houston and Toni Braxton for their vocals, stating their songs "with rich, smoky vocals as thick as Inland Empire smog, exude maturity without resorting to the relentlessly big vocals that characterize so many R&B records aiming for adult audiences." However unlike other critics that praised Babyface for his producing and songwriting ability on the album highly, Greg Kot, the music critic of the Chicago Tribune, was critical of his lyrics and production. Kot wrote "while Babyface's notions are noble, his lyrics too often settle for cliches instead of specifics, and the arrangements are swathed in the kind of synthesized wallpaper that is turning black pop into bland pop. [...] In achieving a dignified elegance, Babyface forgot about the soul." AllMusic's Craig Lytle paid more attention to female vocalists and their performances than lyrics or production for each track, calling the album "outstanding all-female set." Lytle said "the dynamic vocalist[Whitney Houston] sails through the emotional 'Why Does It Hurt So Bad.' On the inspirational duet 'Count on Me,' with CeCe Winas, and both accomplished singers raise all hopes with their comforting vocals", and went to on comment "[on] three stellar selections by three divas ㅡ Aretha Franklin, Patti LaBelle, and Chaka Khan, their voices just defy time by soaring to admirable feats." Billboard described the soundtrack album as "an impeccably timed album with unlimited hit potential", and commented that it is "passionate" ("Sittin' Up in My Room"), "saucy" ("This Is How It Works"), "jazzy" ("Wey U"), and "torch" ("Count on Me").

== Singles ==
"Exhale (Shoop Shoop)", performed by Whitney Houston, was released as the lead single from the soundtrack in November 1995. Billboard called the song "a surprisingly understated shuffle-ballad with soul and far more interesting vocal colors than all the shrieking can provide." The single debuted at number one on the Billboard Hot 100 Singles chart and the Hot R&B Singles chart, the issue date of November 25, 1995, selling 125,000 units in its first week. It became the third single to achieve that feat in Billboard history, following Michael Jackson's "You Are Not Alone" and Mariah Carey's "Fantasy". In addition, it became Houston's eleventh and seventh number one single, on the Hot 100 Singles chart and the Hot R&B Singles chart, respectively. After the single stayed at the top for just one week on the Hot 100 Singles chart, it spent eleven consecutive weeks at number two from December 2, 1995, to February 10, 1996, setting the record for the longest stay in the runner-up position. However, on the Hot R&B Singles chart, "Exhale (Shoop Shoop)" remained at the summit for eight consecutive weeks since its debut week. It sold over 1,500,000 copies in 1995-1996 and was certified Platinum by the RIAA on January 3, 1996.

The album's second single, "Sittin' Up in My Room" by Brandy, debuted at number forty-six and number thirteen, on the Hot 100 Singles chart and Hot R&B Singles chart on December 30, 1995. The single reached the number two on the Hot R&B Singles chart, the issue of February 17, 1996, and stayed there three consecutive weeks. It also peaked at number two on the Hot 100 Singles chart, staying on the chart for a total of thirty-three weeks. Cheo Hodari Coker from the Los Angeles Times praised Babyface for his production on the song, stating "Babyface's funky-but-restrained background track is the real star of this jam. Using a pleasant mixture of plunking bass and synthesizer chords, [the song] proves that he has a grabbag of styles at his disposal." The single earned Platinum award by the RIAA on May 23, 1996, with 1,000,000 copies shipped.

"Not Gon' Cry" by Mary J. Blige was released as the third single in January 1996. It was critically acclaimed with most of them declaring it as "an anthem for many women." Geoffrey Himes of Amazon.com commented, "Mary J. Blige stakes out a claim as the new diva on the block with an astonishing performance on the song." The single entered on the Hot R&B singles chart at number five in its initial week and the following week topped the chart, becoming her fourth number one single. It remained at the top for five consecutive weeks and stayed on the chart for a total of twenty-two weeks. It also became a major hit for Blige on the Billboard Hot 100 Singles chart, peaking at number two position. With first two singles from the album, when "Not Gon' Cry" was positioned in the top 10 on the Hot 100 and Hot R&B Singles chart in February 1996, which made Waiting to Exhale Soundtrack to set the record for the first film soundtrack to produce three simultaneous top 10 hits in history of Billboard charts. The single sold over 1,500,000 units and was certified Platinum by the RIAA on May 23, 1996.

The fourth single from the soundtrack, "Count On Me" performed by Whitney Houston and CeCe Winans, was released in March 1996. Billboard, in their review for the single, referred it as "a buddy song for the diva generation", and complimented both singers on their excellent vocal, commenting "Houston dominates the track, though Winans makes a strong-enough impression that those who have yet to hear her fine recordings will yearn to hear more." The single debuted at number thirty-two and number eleven, on the Hot 100 and Hot R&B Singles chart, the issue of March 23, 1996, respectively. And it peaked at number eight on the Hot 100 and number seven on the Hot R&B Singles chart in May 1996, in addition to reaching number four on Adult Contemporary chart. The song peaked at #32 on the Billboard Mainstream Top 40 becoming Cece's only appearance on that chart. It was certified Platinum by the RIAA on June 25, 2025, with 800,000 copies sold in the United States.

The album's fifth single, "Let It Flow" by Toni Braxton, was released as a two-sided single with "You're Makin' Me High" from Braxton's second album, Secrets, in May 1996. The double-A side single debuted at number seven on the Hot 100 and number two on the Hot R&B Singles chart, the issue dated June 8, 1996, becoming her highest-debuting single. It eventually topped the Hot 100 chart for a week, and the Hot R&B Singles chart for two weeks, which was her first number one single on both charts. Due to its staying power on the Hot R&B Singles chart, it was the #1 R&B Single on the 1996's Billboard year-end charts. The single sold over 1,500,000 copies in the United States and was certified Platinum by the RIAA on July 17, 1996. Just as soon as the soundtrack was released, the song received critical acclaim, being chosen as one of the best tracks on the album by critics. Stephen Holden, the music critic of the New York Times, called it "small pop coup" and added "Braxton snaps out the words with a choked intensity, her dark, grainy contralto conveying a potent mixture of fury and sensuality."

"It Hurts Like Hell" by Aretha Franklin was released as the sixth single from the album in June 1996. It failed to enter on the Hot 100 chart but peaked at number fifty-one on the Hot R&B Singles chart, the issue date of July 20, 1996. The song wasn't hit as big as some of the set's other tracks, but got good reviews at large from critics. Stephen Holden of the New York Times wrote "Franklin rises to heights of letting-it-all-out pop-gospel anguish that she has rarely reached before. Just when you think she can't spill out another drop, there is another melismatic gush of emotion." Geoffrey Himes, in his review for the Washington Post, commented "the album's peak moment belongs to Aretha Franklin, who makes us hear in every note what the title of [the song] is talking about." Babyface, in an interview on Billboard on the 20th anniversary of Waiting To Exhale soundtrack, says,"Then to be in the studio with Aretha for 'It Hurts Like Hell." To this day, when I hear that, that's one of my favorite songs. She's just killin' it. It's a blessing to have just been a part of it."

"Why Does It Hurt So Bad" by Whitney Houston became the seventh and final single to be released off the album in July, 1996. Christopher John Farley of the TIME magazine commented "Houston more than holds her own, particularly on [this], with its masterly balance of pop zip and soulful melancholy." At the time the single was issued, Billboard said "this should have been the follow-up to 'Exhale (Shoop Shoop)'" and added, "she[Houston] was positively luminous on this heartbreak ballad." On August 3, 1996, the single debuted at number sixty and number thirty-four, on the Hot 100 and Hot R&B singles chart, respectively. In a few weeks later, it peaked at number twenty-six on the Hot 100 and number twenty-two on the Hot R&B. Houston performed the song at the 1996 MTV Movie Awards. The track was also included in a medley along with "I Believe in You and Me" and "It Hurts Like Hell" in her set list on her My Love Is Your Love World Tour in 1999.

"This Is How It Works" by TLC and "My Funny Valentine" by Chaka Khan reached numbers 60 and 66 respectively on the Billboard R&B Airplay chart in early 1996 based on unsolicited radio airplay, while "Kissing You" by Faith Evans reached #57 on the R&B Airplay chart as well as #14 on the Billboard Hot R&B Singles chart as the B-side tag along to her single "Ain't Nobody".

== Track listing ==
All tracks are written by Babyface, except where noted.

| No. | Title | Writer(s) | Performer(s) | Length |
|---|---|---|---|---|
| 1. | "Exhale (Shoop Shoop)" | | Whitney Houston | 3:24 |
| 2. | "Why Does It Hurt So Bad" | | Houston | 4:37 |
| 3. | "Let It Flow" | | Toni Braxton | 4:27 |
| 4. | "It Hurts Like Hell" | | Aretha Franklin | 4:19 |
| 5. | "Sittin' Up in My Room" | | Brandy | 4:52 |
| 6. | "This Is How It Works" | Babyface, Lisa Lopes | TLC | 5:00 |
| 7. | "Not Gon' Cry" | | Mary J. Blige | 4:57 |
| 8. | "My Funny Valentine" | Richard Rodgers, Lorenz Hart | Chaka Khan | 4:06 |
| 9. | "And I Gave My Love to You" | Babyface, Sonja Marie | Sonja Marie | 4:48 |
| 10. | "All Night Long" | | SWV | 4:31 |
| 11. | "Wey U" | | Chanté Moore | 4:32 |
| 12. | "My Love, Sweet Love" | | Patti LaBelle | 4:21 |
| 13. | "Kissing You" | | Faith Evans | 3:23 |
| 14. | "Love Will Be Waiting at Home" | | For Real | 5:59 |
| 15. | "How Could You Call Her Baby" | | Shanna | 5:09 |
| 16. | "Count on Me" | Babyface, Houston, Michael Houston | Houston and CeCe Winans | 4:26 |

Notes

- All new songs produced by Babyface.

== Charts ==
=== Weekly charts ===
1995–1996 weekly chart performance for Waiting to Exhale: Original Soundtrack Album
| Chart (1995–1996) | Peak position |
|---|---|
| Australian Albums (ARIA) | 9 |
| Austrian Albums (Ö3 Austria) | 14 |
| Belgian Albums (Ultratop Flanders) | 33 |
| Belgian Albums (Ultratop Wallonia) | 41 |
| Canada Top Albums/CDs (RPM) | 3 |
| Danish Albums (IFPI Danmark) | 10 |
| Dutch Albums (Album Top 100) | 16 |
| European Top 100 Albums (Music & Media) | 17 |
| German Albums (Offizielle Top 100) | 30 |
| Hungarian Albums (MAHASZ) | 40 |
| Italian Albums (Musica e dischi) | 13 |
| Japanese Albums (Oricon) | 26 |
| New Zealand Albums (RMNZ) | 16 |
| Norwegian Albums (VG-lista) | 36 |
| Scottish Albums (Official Charts) | 58 |
| Spanish Albums (PROMUSICAE) | 9 |
| Swedish Albums (Sverigetopplistan) | 20 |
| Swiss Albums (Schweizer Hitparade) | 20 |
| UK Compilation Albums (Official Charts) | 8 |
| UK R&B Albums (Official Charts) | 3 |
| UK Dance Albums (Music Week) | 3 |
| US Billboard 200 | 1 |
| US Top R&B/Hip-Hop Albums (Billboard) | 1 |

2012 weekly chart performance for Waiting to Exhale: Original Soundtrack Album
| Chart (2012) | Peak position |
|---|---|
| UK Soundtrack Albums (Official Charts) | 29 |
| US Billboard 200 | 181 |
| US Soundtrack Albums (Billboard) | 9 |

=== Year-end charts ===
1995 year-end chart performance for Waiting to Exhale: Original Soundtrack Album
| Chart (1995) | Position |
|---|---|
| Canada Top Albums/CDs (RPM) | 73 |
| Dutch Albums (Album Top 100) | 69 |

1996 year-end chart performance for Waiting to Exhale: Original Soundtrack Album
| Chart (1996) | Position |
|---|---|
| Canada Top Albums/CDs (RPM) | 36 |
| European Top 100 Albums (Music & Media) | 73 |
| US Billboard 200 | 4 |
| US Top R&B Albums (Billboard) | 2 |
| US Top Soundtrack Albums (Billboard) | 1 |

=== Decade-end charts ===
1990–1999 decade-end chart performance for Waiting to Exhale: Original Soundtrack Album
| Chart (1990–1999) | Position |
|---|---|
| US Billboard 200 | 61 |

== Certifications and sales ==
| Region | Certification | Certified units/sales |
|---|---|---|
| Australia (ARIA) | Gold | 35,000^{^} |
| Belgium (BRMA) | Gold | 25,000^{*} |
| Canada (Music Canada) | Platinum | 100,000^{^} |
| Japan (RIAJ) | Platinum | 200,000^{^} |
| United Kingdom (BPI) | Gold | 100,000^{*} |
| United States (RIAA) | 7× Platinum | 7,000,000^{^} |
Summaries
| Europe (IFPI) | Platinum | 1,000,000^{*} |
^{*} Sales figures based on certification alone.^{^} Shipments figures based on certification alone.

== Accolades ==
=== American Music Awards ===
| Year | Nominee / work | Award | Result |
|---|---|---|---|
| 1997 | Waiting to Exhale Original Soundtrack Album | Favorite Soundtrack | Won |
| 1997 | Whitney Houston (herself) | Favorite Adult Contemporary Artist | Won |

=== ASCAP Film & Television Music Awards ===
| Year | Nominee / work | Award | Result |
|---|---|---|---|
| 1997 | "Count on Me" | Most Performed Songs, Motion Pictures (Whitney Houston, Michael Houston) | Won |

=== ASCAP Pop Music Awards ===
| Year | Nominee / work | Award | Result |
|---|---|---|---|
| 1997 | "Count on Me" | ASCAP Pop Award (Whitney Houston, Michael Houston) | Won |

=== Billboard Music Awards ===
| Year | Nominee / work | Award | Result |
|---|---|---|---|
| 1996 | "You're Makin' Me High"/"Let It Flow" | R&B Single of the Year | Won |

=== BMI (Broadcast Music Incorporated) Pop Awards ===
| Year | Nominee / work | Award | Result |
|---|---|---|---|
| 1997 | Kenneth "Babyface" Edmonds | The Songwriter of the Year | Won |
| 1997 | "Count on Me" | BMI Pop Award (Kenneth "Babyface" Edmonds) | Won |
| 1997 | "Exhale (Shoop Shoop)" | BMI Pop Award (Kenneth "Babyface" Edmonds) | Won |
| 1997 | "Sittin' Up in My Room" | BMI Pop Award (Kenneth "Babyface" Edmonds) | Won |

=== Grammy Awards ===
| Year | Nominee / work | Award | Result |
|---|---|---|---|
| 1997 | Waiting to Exhale Original Soundtrack Album | Album of the Year | Nominated |
| 1997 | "Exhale (Shoop Shoop)" | Song of the Year (written by Babyface) | Nominated |
| 1997 | "Count on Me" | Best Pop Collaboration with Vocals (Whitney Houston & CeCe Winans) | Nominated |
| 1997 | "Exhale (Shoop Shoop)" | Best R&B Song (written by Babyface) | Won |
| 1997 | "Sittin' Up in My Room" | Best R&B Song (written by Babyface) | Nominated |
| 1997 | "Exhale (Shoop Shoop)" | Best Female R&B Vocal Performance (Whitney Houston) | Nominated |
| 1997 | "Not Gon' Cry" | Best Female R&B Vocal Performance (Mary J. Blige) | Nominated |
| 1997 | "Sittin' Up in My Room" | Best Female R&B Vocal Performance (Brandy) | Nominated |
| 1997 | "It Hurts Like Hell" | Best Song Written for a Motion Picture, Television or Other Visual Media (written by Babyface) | Nominated |
| 1997 | "Count on Me" | Best Song Written for a Motion Picture, Television or Other Visual Media (written by Babyface, Michael Houston and Whitney Houston) | Nominated |
| 1997 | "Exhale (Shoop Shoop)" | Best Song Written for a Motion Picture, Television or Other Visual Media (written by Babyface) | Nominated |

=== MTV Movie Awards ===
| Year | Nominee / work | Award | Result |
|---|---|---|---|
| 1996 | "Exhale (Shoop Shoop)" (by Whitney Houston) | Best Song from a Movie | Nominated |
| 1996 | "Sittin' Up in My Room" (by Brandy) | Best Song from a Movie | Won |

=== MTV Video Music Awards ===
| Year | Nominee / work | Award | Result |
|---|---|---|---|
| 1996 | "Sittin' Up in My Room" (by Brandy) | Best Video from a Film | Nominated |

=== NAACP Image Awards ===
| Year | Nominee / work | Award | Result |
|---|---|---|---|
| 1996 | Waiting to Exhale Original Soundtrack Album | Outstanding Soundtrack Album | Won |
| 1996 | Waiting to Exhale Original Soundtrack Album | Outstanding Album | Won |
| 1996 | "Exhale (Shoop Shoop)" | Outstanding Song | Won |
| 1996 | "Exhale (Shoop Shoop)" | Outstanding Female Artist (Whitney Houston) | Won |

=== The NARM Best Seller Awards ===
| Year | Nominee / work | Award | Result |
|---|---|---|---|
| 1996 | Waiting to Exhale Original Soundtrack Album | Best-selling Soundtrack Recording | Won |

=== People's Choice Awards ===
| Year | Nominee / work | Award | Result |
|---|---|---|---|
| 1996 | Whitney Houston (herself) | Favorite Female Musical Performer | Nominated |
| 1997 | Whitney Houston (herself) | Favorite Female Musical Performer | Nominated |

=== Soul Train Lady of Soul Awards ===
| Year | Nominee / work | Award | Result |
|---|---|---|---|
| 1996 | "Not Gon' Cry" | Best R&B/Soul Single— Solo (Mary J. Blige) | Won |
| 1996 | "Exhale (Shoop Shoop)" | Best R&B/Soul Single—Solo (Whitney Houston) | Nominated |
| 1996 | "Count on Me" | R&B/Soul Composer of the Year (written by Whitney Houston, Kenneth Edmonds and Michael Houston) | Nominated |

=== Soul Train Music Awards ===
| Year | Nominee / work | Award | Result |
|---|---|---|---|
| 1996 | "Exhale (Shoop Shoop)" (by Whitney Houston) | Best R&B/Soul Single, Female | Won |
| 1996 | "Exhale (Shoop Shoop)" (by Whitney Houston) | Best R&B/Soul or Rap Song of the Year | Nominated |

== See also ==
- List of number-one albums of 1995 (U.S.)
- List of number-one albums of 1996 (U.S.)
- List of number-one R&B albums of 1995 (U.S.)
- List of number-one R&B albums of 1996 (U.S.)
