= Exhale (Shoop Shoop) =

1995 single by Whitney Houston

Single by Whitney Houston

from the album Waiting to Exhale: Original Soundtrack Album
- B-side: "Dancin' on the Smooth Edge"
- Released: November 6, 1995
- Genre: R&B
- Length: 3:25
- Label: Arista
- Songwriter: Babyface
- Producer: Babyface

Whitney Houston singles chronology
"Something in Common" (1993)	"Exhale (Shoop Shoop)" (1995)	"Count On Me" (1996)

Music video
- "Exhale (Shoop Shoop)" on YouTube

"Exhale (Shoop Shoop)" is a song by American singer Whitney Houston, featured on the soundtrack for the film Waiting to Exhale. It was released as the lead single from the soundtrack on November 6, 1995, by Arista Records. The song was written and produced by Babyface. A mid-tempo R&B and soul ballad, composed in the key of D-flat major, the song's lyrics speak about growing up and learning to let go. The song garnered mostly positive reviews from critics, many of whom noted Houston's vocal maturity in the song.

In the United States, it became the third single to debut on top of the Billboard Hot 100 chart in Billboard's history, and Houston's eleventh (and final) number one single. It was later certified platinum by the Recording Industry Association of America (RIAA), for shipments of one million copies. The song also reached number one in Canada and Spain, and the top 10 in Finland, the Netherlands, New Zealand, and Sweden. Additionally, it peaked within the top 20 in Australia, Austria, Belgium, Ireland, Norway, Switzerland, and the United Kingdom. At the 39th Annual Grammy Awards, held on February 26, 1997, "Exhale (Shoop Shoop)" received four nominations, including the Grammy Award for Song of the Year, and won in the category of Best R&B Song. The song also won four other awards, including a Soul Train Music Award.

The accompanying music video for the song, directed by Forest Whitaker, shows close-up scenes of Houston inter-cut with scenes from the film Waiting to Exhale. Houston performed the song at the 39th Grammy Awards ceremony, and on the HBO special Classic Whitney Live from Washington, D.C. in October 1997. It was included in the set-list of Houston's three tours and select dates of various concerts.

== Background and release ==
In 1994, Houston signed with 20th Century Fox to play the role of Savannah Jackson in the film Waiting to Exhale, which was adapted from the novel of the same name by Terry McMillan. Initially, she had no interest in recording songs for the film's soundtrack, as she wanted to concentrate on her acting. The film's director, Forest Whitaker, hired Kenneth "Babyface" Edmonds to compose the film score and the accompanying soundtrack. Though Babyface visited the set of the film and tried to convince her, Houston was determined not to record songs for the soundtrack. She finally agreed after hearing Babyface play one of the songs she liked. In an interview with Fred Bronson, Babyface explained the development of the song:

"When Whitney first heard the song, she figured I'd lost it—I couldn't come up with words anymore. And, actually she's right. I couldn't think of anything for that particular part. It felt like it should groove there. But I knew it couldn't groove without any vocals, so I started humming along with it and that's what happened. The 'shoops' came. But they felt so good, I thought 'Why not?' It doesn't have to mean anything."

Babyface produced the song, and it was released as the lead single from the Waiting to Exhale soundtrack in the United Kingdom on November 6, 1995, through Arista Records. In the United States, it was serviced to contemporary hit radio on October 24, 1995, and was released commercially on November 7. In Australia, the single was released on November 27, while in Japan, it was issued two days later. The B-side of the single includes four songs: "Dancin' on the Smooth Edge", which was initially included as the B-side to "All the Man That I Need" (1991), "Moment of Truth", which was initially included as the B-side to "I Wanna Dance with Somebody" (1987), "Do You Hear What I Hear", which Houston recorded for the compilation A Very Special Christmas (1987), and her duet with Aretha Franklin, "It Isn't, It Wasn't, It Ain't Never Gonna Be" (1989). "Exhale (Shoop Shoop)" is also featured on Houston's compilation albums Whitney: The Greatest Hits (2000), Love, Whitney (2001), The Ultimate Collection (2007), The Essential Whitney Houston (2011), and I Will Always Love You: The Best of Whitney Houston (2012).

== Composition ==
"Exhale (Shoop Shoop)" (1995)
A 20-second sample of the song's final chorus features the "shoo bay doop"s and Houston ad-libbing "shoo-bay".

"Exhale (Shoop Shoop)" is an R&B ballad written in the key of C-sharp major. The song is set in common time with a tempo of 69 beats per minute. It has the sequence of F_{(add9)}–C/E–Dm_{7}–C as its chord progression throughout the track, and Houston's vocals span an octave and a perfect fifth, from G_{3} to D_{5}. The song's instrumentation includes quiet bells and strings, and the whole arrangement is mellow. According to Steve Knopper of Newsday, the bells resemble electronic Christmas bells, and Houston ad-libs "shoo-bay" over the chorus. The chorus repeats the phrase "shoo bay doop".

According to Bronson, the song summarizes the movie's philosophy. His opinion was somewhat echoed by Ted Cox, author of the book Whitney Houston, who noted that the soothing quality of the song fitted perfectly with the mood and texture of the movie. He described that the song has a "slow groove" that features the most relaxed singing of Houston's career. The Miami Herald described the song as a model of "refined, easy-going soul", and Kyle Anderson of MTV described it as a "smooth jam" with a "crazy-catchy groove". Describing the instrumentation as "silky", Larry Flick of Billboard wrote that Houston's performance was more soulful than before, with far more "vocal colors". Stephen Holden of The New York Times commented that the song is reminiscent of 1960s girl group records, and the verses speak about growing up and learning to let go.

== Critical reception ==
"Exhale (Shoop Shoop)" received mostly positive reviews from music critics; most of which were positive about Houston's 'soulful' performance and vocal maturity. The Atlanta Journal-Constitution viewed the song as "easy and understated". Larry Flick of Billboard magazine called it "a surprisingly understated shuffle-ballad with soul and far more interesting vocal colors than all the shrieking can provide." However, Patricia Smith of The Boston Globe wrote that the "Shoop Shoop"s were "annoying". Anthony Violenti of The Buffalo News gave the song a positive review, commenting that Houston's vocals were intoxicating. Steve Baltin from Cash Box said it "has SMASH written all over it." He added that the song "has a soothing, gentle feel refreshingly free of Houston’s normal vocal melodramatics." James Masterton for Dotmusic deemed it as "a gorgeous piece of very, very hardcore soul with Whitney adopting a breathy, understated vocal style." Mike Wood from Idolator described it as a "slow-jamming gem", noting "the soothing lyrics about learning how to let go and move on: “Sometimes you laugh, sometimes you cry / Life never tells us the whens or whys.” If only we all could keep that calm in light of life's calamities." Jean Rosenbluth of Los Angeles Times praised the song, saying "Houston's elegant 'Exhale (Shoop Shoop)' [...] exude[s] maturity without resorting to the relentlessly big vocals that characterize so many R&B records aiming for adult audiences."

Robert Hilburn, pop music critic of Los Angeles Times, noted Babyface's achievement in the song, saying "he [Babyface] brings Houston down to earth, trading her normal vocal exuberance for convincing warmth." Pan-European magazine Music & Media stated that it is "fitting Houston like a glove". Alan Jones from Music Week commented that it "is one of her more insidious, gradually getting under your skin. It's a very low-key affair, with Babyface keeping Whitney's "why sing one note when you can sing 10?" and delivering a charming, sweet and effective ballad destined for a long and high chart career." Steve Knopper of Newsday said that the song was "irresistibly catchy" and irritating at the same time. While reviewing Houston's compilation Whitney: The Greatest Hits (2000), Christine Galera of Orlando Sentinel expressed her dislike for the song, stating the songs from Waiting to Exhale, including "Exhale (Shoop Shoop)" and "Why Does It Hurt So Bad", were too mellow. Rome News-Tribune noted that "'Exhale' has an easygoing, infectious charm", and that Houston "delivers a soulfully relaxed vocal." Geoffrey Himes of The Washington Post wrote, "Sounding like someone who has just emptied her lungs after holding her breath a long time, Houston brings a surprisingly mature, world-weary tone to the song."

"Exhale (Shoop Shoop)" was voted number twenty-three on The Village Voice's 1996 Pazz & Jop critics' poll, tied with five other songs, Eels' "Novocaine for the Soul", Everything but the Girl's "Missing", Garbage's "Only Happy When It Rains", Rage Against the Machine's "Bulls on Parade", and Underworld's "Born Slippy". In 2020, Glamour ranked the song number 30 on their list of "53 Best '90s Songs That Are All That and a Bag of Chips". It was placed in The Telegraph's "50 Best Pop Songs Written for Movies" list. In 2024, Billboard ranked the song 73rd place in its list of the 75 "Top Movie Songs of All Time".

== Awards and nominations ==
"Exhale (Shoop Shoop)" won Best R&B/Soul Single, Female award and was nominated for Best R&B/Soul or Rap Song of the Year at the 10th Annual Soul Train Music Awards on March 29, 1996. Houston won two National Association for the Advancement of Colored People (NAACP) Image Awards for Outstanding Song and Outstanding Female Artist at the 27th annual ceremony, broadcast live on April 23, 1996. The song was nominated for Best Song from a Movie at the 5th MTV Movie Awards on June 8, and for Best R&B/Soul Single – Solo at the Second Annual Soul Train Lady of Soul Awards on September 9, 1996. The song received four Grammy nominations―Song of the Year (Babyface), Best R&B Song (Babyface), Best Song Written for a Motion Picture, Television or Other Visual Media (Babyface), and Best Female R&B Vocal Performance (Houston), and won in the category of Best R&B Song, at the 39th Grammy Awards, held on February 26, 1997. Kenneth "Babyface" Edmonds won a Broadcast Music Incorporated (BMI) Pop Music Award for the song at the 45th annual ceremony, held on May 13, 1997.

== Chart performance ==
In the United States, "Exhale (Shoop Shoop)" debuted at number one on the Billboard Hot 100 chart and the Hot R&B Singles chart, the issue dated November 25, 1995, with 125,000 copies sold in its first week. It became the third number-one single to do so in Billboard's history, following Michael Jackson's "You Are Not Alone" (1995) and Mariah Carey's "Fantasy" (1995). In addition, it became Houston's 11th and seventh number one single on the Hot 100 and the Hot R&B Singles charts respectively, and was Houston's final number one hit on the Hot 100 chart. The single stayed at the top of the Hot 100 for one week. It descended to the number two position and spent 11 consecutive weeks there, from December 2, 1995, to February 10, 1996, setting the record for the longest stay in the runner-up position. (That record has since been equalled by Olivia Rodrigo's "Good 4 U", in 2021, and surpassed by the Kid Laroi and Justin Bieber's "Stay", in 2022.) On the Hot R&B Singles chart, the single remained at the summit for eight consecutive weeks from its debut week, making it Houston's second-longest stay on the top position since "I Will Always Love You" (1992), which remained atop the chart for 11 weeks. The song peaked at number five on the Billboard Adult Contemporary chart, spending a total of 26 weeks on the chart. The song placed at number 14 and number 18 on the 1996 Billboard year-end Hot 100 and Hot R&B Singles charts respectively. It has sold over 1,500,000 copies in the US and was certified platinum for shipments exceeding 1,000,000 copies by the Recording Industry Association of America (RIAA) on January 3, 1996. In Canada, the single entered the RPM 100 Hit Tracks chart at number 90, on November 13, 1995. Eight weeks later, it topped the chart and spent two weeks at the top spot, becoming Houston's eighth number-one single in Canada. The song was ranked at number 20 on the RPM Year-end Top 100 Hit Tracks chart for 1996.

In other countries, the single performed well on the chart. In the United Kingdom, it debuted and peaked at number 11 on the UK Singles Chart for the week dated November 18, 1995. According to MTV, the single has sold about 100,000 copies in the UK. In the Netherlands, "Exhale (Shoop Shoop)" peaked at number seven and stayed on the chart for a total of 11 weeks. It made number 79 on the Dutch Singles year-end charts. In Australia, the song entered the ARIA Charts at number 30, the week dated December 10, 1995. The following week, it ascended to its peak position of number 18. In Switzerland, "Exhale" debuted at number 16, the week dated December 10, 1995. Three weeks later, it peaked at number 13. The song also reached number six in Finland and number four in New Zealand, and number 10 in Sweden. It peaked within the top 20 of the singles charts in a few other countries: number 15 in Austria, 16 in Belgium (Wallonia) and Ireland, 14 in Norway, and 13 in Switzerland. The single also peaked at number 22 in Belgium (Flanders), 23 in France, and 26 in Germany.

== Music video ==
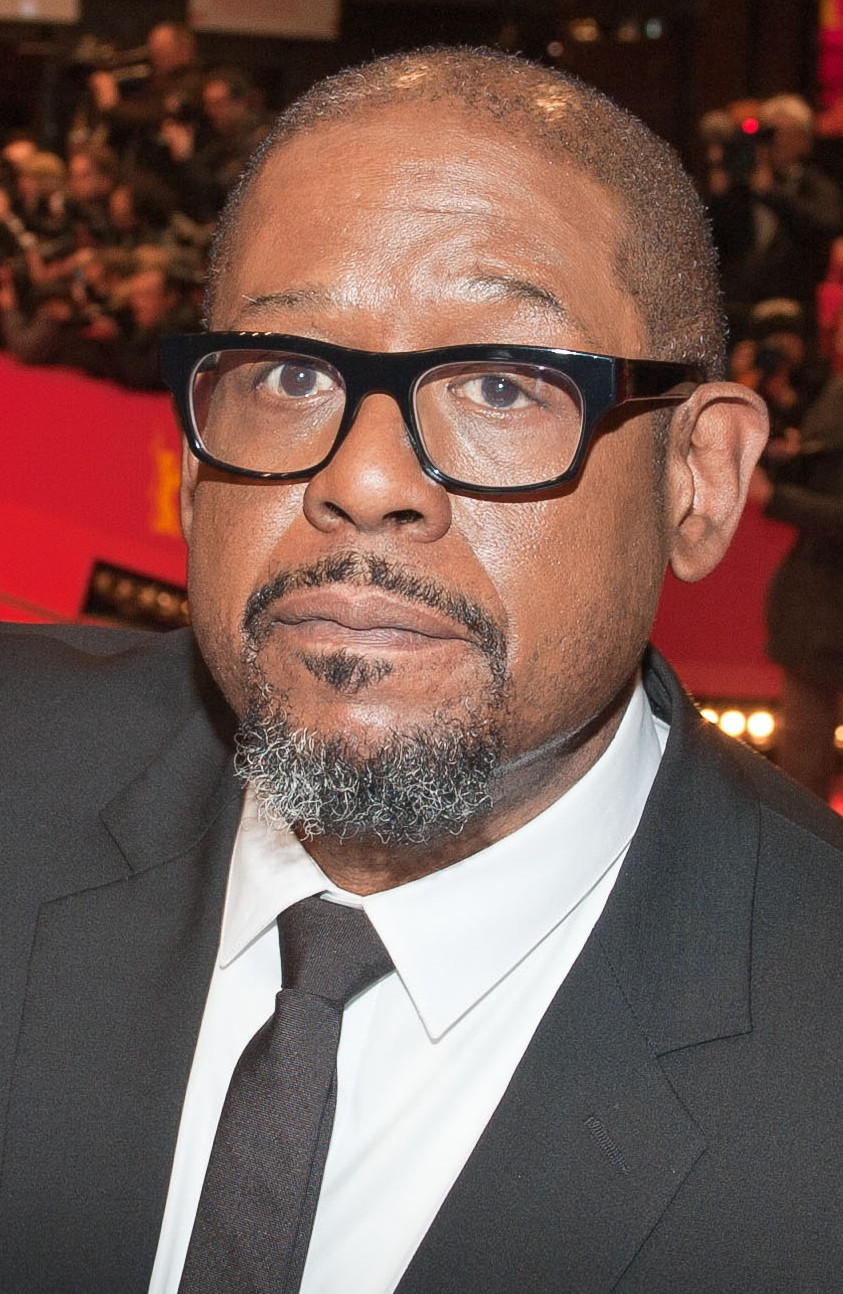
Houston personally asked Forest Whitaker (pictured) to direct the video.

The music video for "Exhale (Shoop Shoop)" was directed by American actor and director Forest Whitaker, who also directed Waiting to Exhale. The video focuses mainly on close-ups of Houston, sporting a short and mature coif, as she sings. Scenes of the movie are inter-cut between her scenes. In a Making of the Video segment of "Exhale (Shoop Shoop)", which aired on Japanese satellite television channel NHK-BS2, Houston explained:

"I wanted him [Whitaker] to do it. And he said 'yeah'. I said 'are you sure you can? Because you've got so much to do.' He said 'I think I can do this.' I kinda got afraid because I knew he was working so hard."

According to Houston, the song was direct, so she wanted the video to be direct and concentrate on her face and on the lyrics. Whitaker also expressed a same opinion of the song. He said, "I've seen the video [...] It's like a thing she has, you know, that I guess people would say is like a charisma kinda thing that it zooms, you know, comes up. It's beautiful [...] It's magic, it's spirit." The video aired on MTV on October 10, 1995. According to Marla Shelton, a writer for Camera Obscura, a journal of feminism and film theory, "the video concept's originality stops with Houston's hair style as its stark simplicity underscores the 'straight and narrow' politics of the film." When the film was released, the video was shown as a trailer prior to the beginning of films on 450 General Cinema screens in some major US media markets.

The video for "Exhale (Shoop Shoop)" was later published on Houston's official YouTube channel in November 2009. It has amassed more than 73 million views as of November 2026.

== Live performances and covers ==
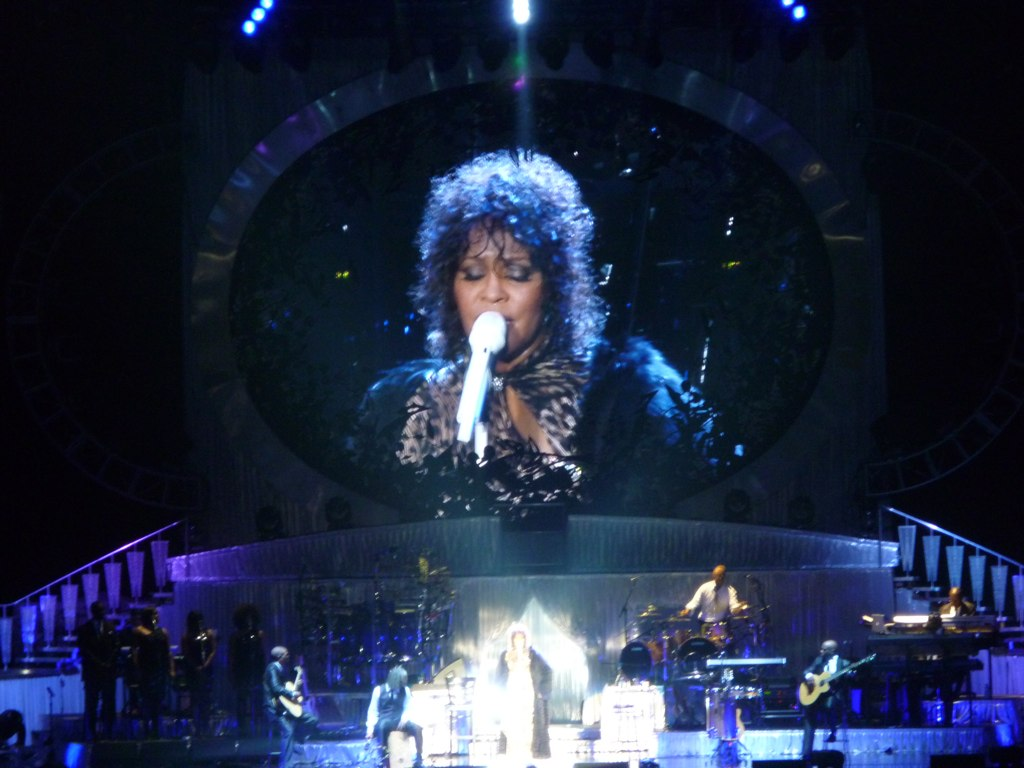
Whitney Houston performing in Milan during her Nothing but Love World Tour, in 2010

Houston performed "Exhale (Shoop Shoop)" live a number of times, between 1996 and 2009. In February 1997, Houston performed it as the third song of her 'Waiting to Exhale Medley'―"Sittin' Up in My Room" by Brandy, "Not Gon' Cry" by Mary J. Blige, "Exhale (Shoop Shoop)" by Houston, and "Count On Me" by Houston, CeCe Winans, Brandy, Blige, Chaka Khan, and Aretha Franklin―at the 39th Grammy Awards. Houston sang the song live on the HBO special "Classic Whitney Live from Washington, D.C." on both October 3 and 5, 1997. Houston's solo performance was followed by ad-libs of its chorus. She was joined by BeBe Winans, Monica, and Shirley Caesar, who was seated in the audience and invited onstage by Houston. Houston used the song throughout the entire run of her The Pacific Rim Tour (1997). She performed it again during the entire run of her My Love Is Your Love World Tour (1999), as a part of the promotion for her fourth studio album, My Love Is Your Love (1998). In April 2000, Houston performed the song on the 25th Anniversary Celebration of Arista Records. Houston started by saying "We all need to exhale sometimes", and proceeded to sing the song. The song was included in the set list of her Nothing but Love World Tour (2010) promoting her seventh studio album, I Look to You (2009).

Babyface performed the song with Beverly Crowder on MTV Unplugged on October 18, 1997. The performance was released on CD in November 1997, and on DVD and VHS in August 2001, titled Babyface MTV Unplugged NYC 1997. In April 2012, possibly as a tribute to Houston following her death, R&B singer Robin Thicke covered the song and released his rendition as a single.

== Track listings and formats ==
- US 12" vinyl single / US CD single (Version 1) / JPN Maxi-CD single / Extended play
1. "Exhale (Shoop Shoop)" – 3:25
2. "Dancin' on the Smooth Edge" – 6:19
3. "Moment of Truth" – 4:40
4. "Do You Hear What I Hear?" – 3:32
5. "It Isn't, It Wasn't, It Ain't Never Gonna Be" (Duet with Aretha Franklin) – 4:51
- US CD single (Version 2) / JPN 3" CD single
1. "Exhale (Shoop Shoop)" – 3:25
2. "Dancin' on the Smooth Edge" – 6:19
- EU CD single
1. "Exhale (Shoop Shoop)" – 3:25
2. "Do You Hear What I Hear?" – 3:32
3. "Moment of Truth" – 4:40
- EU Maxi-CD single
1. "Exhale (Shoop Shoop)" – 3:25
2. "Dancin' on the Smooth Edge" – 6:19
3. "It Isn't, It Wasn't, It Ain't Never Gonna Be" (Duet with Aretha Franklin) – 4:51

== Credits and personnel ==
Credits adapted from "Exhale (Shoop Shoop)" single liner notes.

"Exhale (Shoop Shoop)"

- Babyface – writer, producer
- Whitney Houston – vocals, vocal arrangement

"Dancin' on the Smooth Edge"

- David Lasley – writer
- Robbie Long – writer
- Narada Michael Walden – producer, vocal arrangement
- Whitney Houston – vocals

"Moment of Truth"

- David Paul Bryant – writer
- Jan Buckingham – writer
- Narada Michael Walden – producer
- Whitney Houston – vocals

"Do You Hear What I Hear"

- Gloria Shayne Baker – writer
- Noël Regney – writer
- Jimmy Iovine – producer
- Whitney Houston – vocals

"It Isn't, It Wasn't, It Ain't Never Gonna Be"

- Albert Hammond – writer
- Diane Warren – writer
- Narada Michael Walden – producer
- Aretha Franklin – vocals
- Whitney Houston – vocals

== Charts ==
=== Weekly charts ===
Chart (1995–1996)	Peak position
Australia (ARIA)	18
Austria (Ö3 Austria Top 40)	15
Belgium (Ultratop 50 Flanders)	22
Belgium (Ultratop 50 Wallonia)	16
Brazil (ABPD)	2
Canada Top Singles (RPM)	1
Canada Retail Singles (The Record)	2
Canada Adult Contemporary (RPM)	1
Canada Contemporary Hit Radio (The Record)	4
Denmark (IFPI)	6
Europe (Eurochart Hot 100)	11
Europe (European Hit Radio)	1
Finland (Suomen virallinen lista)	6
France (SNEP)	23
Germany (GfK)	26
Hungary (Mahasz)	8
Iceland (Íslenski Listinn Topp 40)	36
Ireland (IRMA)	16
Israel (Israeli Singles Chart)	4
Italy (Musica e dischi)	5
Italy Airplay (Music & Media)	1
Japan (Oricon)	61
Netherlands (Dutch Top 40)	7
Netherlands (Single Top 100)	12
New Zealand (Recorded Music NZ)	4
Norway (VG-lista)	14
Panama (UPI)	2
Quebec (ADISQ)	1
Scottish Singles Sales (Official Charts)	23
Spain (AFYVE)	1
Sweden (Sverigetopplistan)	10
Switzerland (Schweizer Hitparade)	13
UK Singles (Official Charts)	11
UK Hip Hop/R&B (Official Charts)	2
UK Airplay (Music Week)	9
US Billboard Hot 100	1
US Adult Contemporary (Billboard)	5
US Adult Pop Airplay (Billboard)	14
US Hot R&B/Hip-Hop Songs (Billboard)	1
US Adult R&B Songs (Billboard)	1
US Maxi-Singles Sales (Billboard)	1
US Pop Airplay (Billboard)	6
US Rhythmic Airplay (Billboard)	3
Zimbabwe (ZIMA)	1

=== Year-end charts ===
Chart (1995)	Position
Belgium (Ultratop 50 Wallonia)	97
Netherlands (Single Top 100)	88
Sweden (Topplistan)	87

Chart (1996)	Position
Canada Top Singles (RPM)	20
Canada Adult Contemporary (RPM)	9
Europe (Eurochart Hot 100)	94
Netherlands (Dutch Top 40)	79
US Billboard Hot 100	14
US Adult Contemporary (Billboard)	16
US Adult Top 40 (Billboard)	39
US Hot R&B Singles (Billboard)	18
US Top 40/Mainstream (Billboard)	36
US Top 40/Rhythm-Crossover (Billboard)	23

== Certifications ==
Region	Certification	Certified units/sales
New Zealand (RMNZ)	Gold	5,000^{*}
United Kingdom (BPI)	Silver	200,000^{‡}
United States (RIAA)	Platinum	1,500,000
^{*} Sales figures based on certification alone.

== See also ==
- List of number-one singles of 1995 (Spain)
- List of Hot 100 number-one singles of 1995 (U.S.)
- List of R&B number-one singles of 1995 (U.S.)
- List of R&B number-one singles of 1996 (U.S.)
- List of RPM number-one singles of 1996

== Bibliography ==
- Bronson, Fred (2003), The Billboard Book of Number 1 Hits, New York: Billboard Books, ISBN 0-8230-7677-6
- Bego, Mark (2001), Aretha Franklin: The Queen of Soul, New York: Da Capo Press, ISBN 0-306-80935-4
- Cox, Ted (1998), Whitney Houston, Philadelphia: Chelsea House Publishers, ISBN 978-0-7910-4456-8
