= Not Gon' Cry =

1996 single by Mary J. Blige

- US CD single

Single by Mary J. Blige

from the album Waiting to Exhale and Share My World
- Released: January 23, 1996
- Genre: R&B
- Length: 4:58
- Label: Arista
- Songwriter: Babyface
- Producer: Babyface

Mary J. Blige singles chronology
"(You Make Me Feel Like) A Natural Woman" (1996)	"Not Gon' Cry" (1996)	"Touch Me, Tease Me" (1996)

Audio
- "Not Gon' Cry" on YouTube

"Not Gon' Cry" is a song by American R&B singer Mary J. Blige, from the soundtrack to the film Waiting to Exhale; the song is also featured on Blige's third album, Share My World (1997). It was written and produced by Babyface and became a major hit for Blige in the United States, where it peaked at numbers one and two on the Billboard Hot R&B Singles and Hot 100 charts, respectively. The single sold 1,000,000 copies domestically and was certified platinum by the Recording Industry Association of America.

Blige received her third Grammy Award nomination for Best Female R&B Vocal Performance (her first nomination in that category) at the 39th Grammy Awards in 1997 for the song. Coincidentally, other songs on that were later released as singles from the soundtrack ("Exhale" by Whitney Houston and "Sittin' Up in My Room" by Brandy) also received nominations in the same category. Blige performed the song at the 39th Grammy Awards telecast.

== Background ==
The lyrics of the song are inspired by a storyline in the movie Waiting to Exhale revolving around one of the films main characters, Bernadine (portrayed by actress Angela Bassett), who gets abandoned by her philandering husband. The music video, which incorporates clips from Waiting to Exhale, was directed by Wayne Maser and Elizabeth Bailey.

== Critical reception ==
Larry Flick from Billboard magazine named "Not Gon' Cry" "one of the strongest numbers" of the Waiting to Exhale soundtrack and felt it "is finally given a crack at chart success." He explained, "Blige's worldly delivery breathes palpable depth and empathy into Babyface's composition tracing the bitter split of a relationship. She convincingly builds from white-knuckled anger to cathartic resolution in the space of four minutes, riding a slowly grinding R&B groove etched with quiet blues colors. Judging from the sparks ignited here, the pairing of Blige and Babyface is one that needs to happen again and again." Jonathan Bernstein from Entertainment Weekly described the song as "snarling". A reviewer from Music Week gave it a score of three out of five, describing it as a "slow, steel-tipped ballad" and "good, if not memorable." Pan-European magazine Music & Media wrote, "Blige has a raw edge in her voice that makes her contribution 'Not Gon' Cry' essentially a blues song, despite the smooth R&B production." People Magazine named it Waiting to Exhale's "jilted woman's manifesto".

== Charts ==
=== Weekly charts ===
Chart (1996)	Peak position
Australia (ARIA)	164
New Zealand (Recorded Music NZ)	12
Scottish Singles Sales (Official Charts)	93
UK Singles (Official Charts)	39
UK Hip Hop/R&B (Official Charts)	5
US Billboard Hot 100	2
US Dance Singles Sales (Billboard)	31
US Hot R&B/Hip-Hop Songs (Billboard)	1
US Pop Airplay (Billboard)	36
US Rhythmic Airplay (Billboard)	3
US Cash Box Top 100	1

=== Year-end charts ===
Chart (1996)	Position
US Billboard Hot 100	32
US Hot R&B Singles (Billboard)	13
US Top 40/Rhythm-Crossover (Billboard)	15

== Certifications ==
Region	Certification	Certified units/sales
United States (RIAA)	Platinum	1,000,000^{^}
^{^} Shipments figures based on certification alone.

== Release history ==
Region	Date	Format(s)	Label(s)	Ref.
United States	January 23, 1996	—N/a	Arista	
United States	February 13, 1996	Contemporary hit radio	Arista	
United Kingdom	March 18, 1996	7-inch vinyl; CD; cassette	Arista	

== See also ==
- List of number-one R&B singles of 1996 (U.S.)
