= 1996 MTV Movie Awards =

American awards show

- Date: Saturday, June 8, 1996
- Location: Walt Disney Studios, Burbank, California
- Country: United States
- Hosted by: Ben Stiller and Janeane Garofalo

Television/radio coverage
- Network: MTV

The 1996 MTV Movie Awards was hosted by Ben Stiller and Janeane Garofalo and took place at the Walt Disney Studios in Burbank, California, and aired on MTV on Saturday, June 8, 1996.

== Performers ==
- Whitney Houston — "Why Does It Hurt So Bad"
- Garbage — "Only Happy When It Rains"
- Roberta Flack and Fugees — "Killing Me Softly"
- Adam Sandler — "Mel Gibson"

== Presenters ==
- Claire Danes and Shaquille O'Neal — presented Most Desirable Female
- Samantha Mathis and Anthony Kiedis — presented Best Fight
- Janeane Garofalo — introduced Whitney Houston
- Vanessa Williams and Laurence Fishburne — presented Best On-Screen Duo
- Natalie Portman and Gabriel Byrne — presented Best Villain
- Kiss — presented Best Kiss
- Janeane Garofalo — introduced Garbage
- Lela Rochon — presented Best Song
- Patrick Stewart — presented the Lifetime Achievement Award
- David Duchovny and Penelope Ann Miller — presented Breakthrough Performance
- Ben Stiller — introduced Fugees
- Jamie Lee Curtis — presented Best Action Sequence
- Patricia Arquette — presented Best New Filmmaker
- Garry Shandling — presented Best Sandwich in a Movie
- Jenny McCarthy and Jon Lovitz — presented Best Female Performance
- Ben Stiller — introduced Adam Sandler
- Ellen DeGeneres — presented Best Male Performance
- Whoopi Goldberg — presented Best Movie

== Awards ==
Below are the list of nominations. Winners are listed first and highlighted in bold. There was also an award unique to that year called "Best Sandwich in a Movie".

Best Movie	Best Male Performance
**Seven**; Apollo 13; Braveheart; Clueless; Dangerous Minds	**Jim Carrey – Ace Ventura: When Nature Calls**; Mel Gibson – Braveheart; Tom Hanks – Apollo 13; Denzel Washington – Crimson Tide; Brad Pitt – Twelve Monkeys
Best Female Performance	Most Desirable Male
**Alicia Silverstone – Clueless**; Sandra Bullock – While You Were Sleeping; Michelle Pfeiffer – Dangerous Minds; Susan Sarandon – Dead Man Walking; Sharon Stone – Casino	**Brad Pitt – Seven**; Antonio Banderas – Desperado; Mel Gibson – Braveheart; Val Kilmer – Batman Forever; Keanu Reeves – A Walk in the Clouds
Most Desirable Female	Breakthrough Performance
**Alicia Silverstone – Clueless**; Sandra Bullock – While You Were Sleeping; Nicole Kidman – Batman Forever; Demi Moore – The Scarlet Letter; Michelle Pfeiffer – Dangerous Minds	**George Clooney – From Dusk Till Dawn**; Sean Patrick Flanery – Powder; Natasha Henstridge – Species; Lela Rochon – Waiting to Exhale; Chris Tucker – Friday
Best On-Screen Duo	Best Villain
**Chris Farley and David Spade – Tommy Boy**; Martin Lawrence and Will Smith – Bad Boys; Ice Cube and Chris Tucker – Friday; Brad Pitt and Morgan Freeman – Seven; Tom Hanks and Tim Allen – Toy Story	**Kevin Spacey – Seven**; Jim Carrey – Batman Forever; Joe Pesci – Casino; Tommy Lee Jones – Batman Forever; John Travolta – Broken Arrow
Best Comedic Performance	Best Song from a Movie
**Jim Carrey – Ace Ventura: When Nature Calls**; Chris Farley – Tommy Boy; Adam Sandler – Happy Gilmore; Alicia Silverstone – Clueless; Chris Tucker – Friday	**Brandy — "Sittin' Up In My Room" (from Waiting to Exhale)**; Coolio — "Gangsta's Paradise" (from Dangerous Minds); Whitney Houston — "Exhale (Shoop Shoop)" (from Waiting to Exhale); U2 — "Hold Me, Thrill Me, Kiss Me, Kill Me" (from Batman Forever); Seal — "Kiss From a Rose" (from Batman Forever)
Best Kiss	Best Action Sequence
**Natasha Henstridge and Anthony Guidera – Species**; Antonio Banderas and Salma Hayek – Desperado; Sophie Okonedo and Jim Carrey – Ace Ventura: When Nature Calls; Winona Ryder and Dermot Mulroney – How to Make an American Quilt; Aitana Sánchez-Gijón and Keanu Reeves – A Walk in the Clouds	**Battle Scene** – Braveheart; Airplane Hangar Shootout – Bad Boys; Underground Shootout/Explosion – Broken Arrow; Drive Through NYC/Subway Explosion and Derailment – Die Hard with a Vengeance
Best Fight	Best Sandwich in a Movie
**Adam Sandler vs. Bob Barker – Happy Gilmore**; John Travolta vs. Christian Slater – Broken Arrow; Pierce Brosnan vs. Famke Janssen – GoldenEye; Jackie Chan vs. Bad Guys – Rumble in the Bronx	**Ham and Cheese Sandwich – Smoke**; Turkey Club Sandwich - Four Rooms; Submarine Sandwich With Tomatoes and Provolone - GoldenEye
Best New Filmmaker
**Wes Anderson – Bottle Rocket**
Lifetime Achievement Award
**Godzilla**
