= Why Does It Hurt So Bad =

Single by Whitney Houston

from the album Waiting to Exhale: Original Soundtrack Album
- B-side: "I Wanna Dance With Somebody (Who Loves Me)" [Junior's Happy Hand Bag Mix]
- Released: July 22, 1996
- Recorded: October 1995
- Studio: The Tracken Place (Beverly, Hills, California, US); Record Plant (Los Angeles, US); Crossway Studios (Mendham, New Jersey, US)
- Genre: R&B
- Length: 4:37
- Label: Arista
- Songwriter: Babyface
- Producer: Babyface

Whitney Houston singles chronology
"Count On Me" (1996)	"Why Does It Hurt So Bad" (1996)	"I Believe in You and Me" (1996)

Licensed audio
- "Why Does It Hurt So Bad (from "Waiting to Exhale" - Original Soundtrack)" on YouTube

"Why Does It Hurt So Bad" is a song recorded by American singer and actress Whitney Houston for the 1995 film Waiting to Exhale. It was released on July 22, 1996, by Arista Records as the seventh and final single from the accompanying soundtrack. The song was written and produced solely by Babyface. Musically, it is an R&B ballad, and the lyrics chronicle a lovelorn lament.

The song garnered positive reviews from critics, who commended Houston's vocal effort. It charted in the United States on the Billboard Hot 100, peaking at number twenty-six. It also reached a peak position of number twenty-two in the Hot R&B/Hip-Hop Songs chart and number six on the Adult Contemporary chart. In Canada, the song reached a peak of number forty-five on the RPM Singles chart. Although there is no official music video for the song, a performance of the song at the 1996 MTV Movie Awards was taped and is used as a promotional clip. The song was later included as a medley, in her My Love Is Your Love World Tour (1999), along with a few other songs.

== Background ==
Houston starred in the 1995 romance film Waiting to Exhale, directed by Forest Whitaker. Although Houston did not intend to contribute to the film's soundtrack, when Whitaker hired Babyface to score the soundtrack, she opted in. Babyface, Houston and some other African-American female singers recorded songs for the album. The song was one of the final additions to the soundtrack. "Why Does It Hurt So Bad" was originally written by Babyface for Houston, four years prior to the release of Waiting to Exhale, but Houston refused to record it at that time. "I wasn't really in the mood for singing about why it hurts so bad," said Houston. Two years later, according to Chris Willman of Entertainment Weekly, the emotions of the movie merged with the real-life circumstances of Houston's troubled marriage to Bobby Brown. "Now, I'm ready to sing not only the joys of things, but the pains of things, also," Houston explained.

== Composition ==
"Why Does It Hurt So Bad"
A 27-second sample from Whitney Houston's "Why Does It Hurt So Bad". The song uses a subtle amount of vocal harmony, while the lyrics chronicle a lament.

"Why Does It Hurt So Bad" is an R&B ballad. The song was written and produced by Kenneth Brian Edmonds, popularly known as "Babyface". According to the sheet music book for The Greatest Hits at Sheetmusicplus.com, the song is written in the key of B♭ major, and moves at a tempo of 69 beats per minute. It is set in time signature of common time and features a basic chord progression of B/E–Em–C♯m–G♯_{7}. Houston's vocals span from the note of F_{3} to the note of F_{5}. According to Stephen Holden of New York Times, the song is a "lovelorn lament with a realistic twist". He noted that, through the verses, the singer congratulates herself for breaking up with an abusive boyfriend and admits that she is still in love.

== Reception ==
"Why Does It Hurt So Bad" garnered mainly positive reviews from critics. Craig Lytle of AllMusic noted that Houston's voice "sailed" through the song. Larry Flick of Billboard felt that it should have been released as the follow-up single to "Exhale (Shoop Shoop)". He added, "Paired with Babyface, Houston is positively luminous on [this] heartbreak ballad, performing with a perfect blend of theatrical melodrama and guttural soul". A writer for Boston Herald noted that the song was "understated". Steve Knopper of Newsday wrote, "It's lower-key and the singer, who also stars in the film, doesn't feel compelled to perform constant vocal feats." Cary Darling of Rome News-Tribune gave a negative review. She said that "[the] ballad 'Why Does It Hurt So Bad' is [more] standard Whitney-fare". Deborah Wilker of South Florida Sun-Sentinel was mixed in her review, commenting that the song was a "predictably histrionic follow-up" to "Exhale (Shoop Shoop)". Nick Krewen of The Spectator was even less enthusiastic, writing "[...] the two guaranteed [Whitney Houston] hits – 'Exhale (Shoop Shoop)' and 'Why Does It Hurt So Bad' – don't really offer anything new." Christopher John Farley of TIME stated that Houston "particularly held her own", with a "masterly balance of pop, zip, and soulful melancholy".

Released as the seventh and final single from the Waiting to Exhale: Original Soundtrack Album, the song debuted at number 60 on the Billboard Hot 100, on the issue dated August 3, 1996. On the same issue, the song debuted at number 34 on the Hot R&B/Hip-Hop Singles chart. The song later reached a peak of number 26 on the Hot 100, and 22 on the R&B/Hip-Hop Singles chart. It also reached number six on the Adult Contemporary chart, while reaching a peak of 39 on the Adult Pop Songs chart. The song spent 20 cumulative weeks on the Hot 100, with eight of those weeks spent inside the top 40. In Canada, the song debuted at number 98 on the RPM Singles chart, on the July 22, 1996 issue. Later, on the September 15, 1996 issue, it reached a peak of number 45.

== Music video and live performances ==
The song was not promoted through an official music video, although Houston appeared at the 1996 MTV Movie Awards held at Walt Disney Studios, Burbank and performed "Why Does It Hurt So Bad". The performance was directed and taped by Bruce Gowers and was later used as a promotional clip to accompany the song. The performance features Houston sitting on a chair, wearing a white outfit, and singing the song.

Houston performed the song on her My Love Is Your Love World Tour, in 1999. The song was performed as a part of the "Movie Medley", along with "I Believe in You and Me", "It Hurts Like Hell", originally performed by Aretha Franklin, and "I Will Always Love You". This performance was taped in Sopot, Poland, on August 22, 1999 and broadcast on Polish television channel, TVP1.

== Track listing ==
- US CD 1
1. "Why Does It Hurt So Bad" [Album Version] – 4:37
2. "I Wanna Dance With Somebody (Who Loves Me)" [Junior's Happy Hand Bag Mix] – 9:02
- US CD 2
1. "Why Does It Hurt So Bad" [Album Version] – 4:37
2. "Why Does It Hurt So Bad" [Live from the 1996 MTV Movie Awards] – 5:34
3. "I Wanna Dance with Somebody (Who Loves Me)" [Junior's Happy Hand Bag Mix] – 9:02
4. "I Wanna Dance with Somebody (Who Loves Me)" [Junior's X-Beat Dub] – 8:05

== Credits and personnel ==
Retrieved from CD liner notes

Why Does It Hurt So Bad

- Brad Gilderman – vocals recorder
- Babyface – writer, vocals producer, background vocals
- Whitney Houston – vocals, background vocals
- Jon Gass – mixer
- Kevon Edmonds – background vocals
- Marc Nelson – background vocals

Why Does It Hurt So Bad (Live)

- Babyface – writer
- Rickey Minor – producer
- Whitney Houston – vocals, producer
- Bill Schnee – mixer
- John Hendrickson – mixer assistant

== Charts ==
=== Weekly charts ===
Chart (1996)	Peak position
Australia (ARIA)	99
Canada Top Singles (RPM)	45
Taiwan (IFPI)	9
US Billboard Hot 100	26
US Hot R&B/Hip-Hop Songs (Billboard)	22
US Adult R&B Songs (Billboard)	5
US Adult Contemporary (Billboard)	6
US Adult Pop Airplay (Billboard)	39

=== Year-end charts ===
Chart (1996)	Position
Canadian Adult Contemporary Tracks	71
US Hot R&B Singles (Billboard)	90
