= Count On Me (Whitney Houston and CeCe Winans song) =

"Count on Me"

Single by Whitney Houston and CeCe Winans

from the album Waiting to Exhale: Original Soundtrack Album
- B-side: "One Moment in Time"
- Released: March 4, 1996
- Studio: The Tracken Place (Beverly Hills, CA); Record Plant (Los Angeles, CA); Crossway Studios (Mendham, NJ)
- Genre: R&B; soul; gospel
- Length: 4:26
- Label: Arista
- Songwriters: Whitney Houston; Babyface; Michael Houston
- Producer: Babyface

Whitney Houston singles chronology
"Exhale (Shoop Shoop)" (1995)	"Count on Me" (1996)	"Why Does It Hurt So Bad" (1996)

CeCe Winans singles chronology
"Every Time" (1995)	"Count on Me" (1996)	"Well Alright," "What About You," "Slippin'" (1998)

Music video
- "Whitney Houston, CeCe Winans - Count On Me (Official HD Video)" on YouTube

"Count on Me" is a duet recorded by American singers and best friends Whitney Houston and CeCe Winans. It was written by Houston, Babyface and Houston's brother Michael with its production helmed by Babyface. Released in March 1996, the song was the fourth single from the soundtrack album of the motion picture Waiting to Exhale, and the second single by Houston released from that soundtrack.

It is an uplifting song about leaning on a friend for support when needed. Upon its release, it became an immediate hit peaking inside the top ten of the Billboard Hot 100, becoming the fourth and final single from the soundtrack to reach the top ten. It was also successful on other Billboard charts, peaking in the top ten of the Hot R&B Singles and Hot Adult Contemporary charts and peaking at number one on the Adult R&B Songs chart. The song sold over 2 million copies worldwide.

Outside the United States, it was a moderate success, peaking in the top 40 in Canada, Austria, the Netherlands, Switzerland, Iceland and New Zealand while having its biggest international peak in the United Kingdom where it peaked inside the top 20 at number 12.

The ballad won two Grammy Award nominations, including Best Song Written for Visual Media, as well as two songwriting awards from ASCAP in its pop song and film awards as well as a BMI Award. It was Winans' only crossover hit single outside her gospel genre and Houston's first top ten duet of her career. The song has since been certified platinum in the US.

CeCe performed the song as a tribute to Whitney, the first ever recipient of the Triumphant Spirit Award at the 10th annual Essence Awards, taped on April 4, 1997 and broadcast later on Fox TV, May 22, 1997.

== Background ==
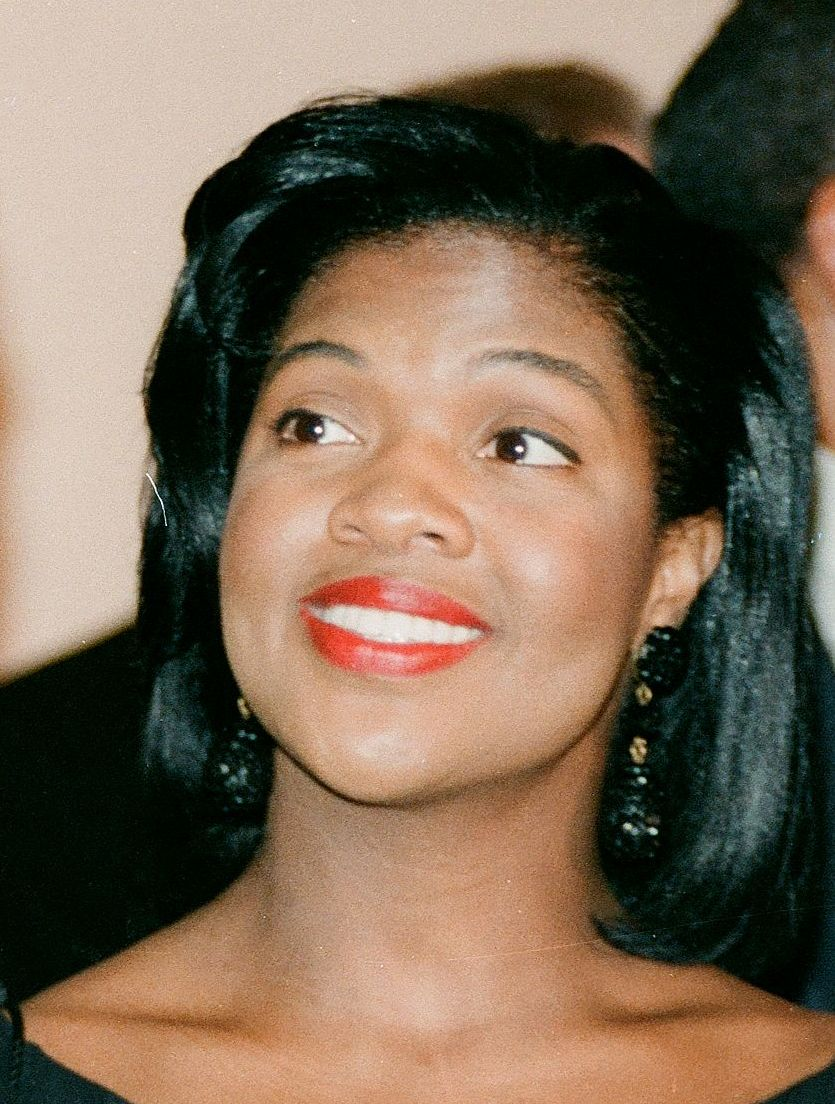
CeCe Winans was picked as the duet partner of "Count On Me" due to her and Houston's real-life friendship in comparison to the friendship shared in Waiting to Exhale.

Houston first met CeCe Winans and her brother BeBe Winans in 1987 at the NAACP Image Awards where BeBe & CeCe Winans attended and performed. Houston later showed up for a concert the siblings held in Los Angeles that same night and joined them onstage, marking the first of such occasions whenever Houston was an attendant. The trio became fast friends upon meeting and Houston and CeCe in particular saw each other as "sisters". Winans later recalled that the two related to each other well due to shared strong religious faith. Winans later told People magazine that she was convinced Houston, who was the daughter of gospel singer Cissy Houston and had grown up singing in a Baptist church, "was a gospel singer" herself.

In 1988, Houston contributed vocals on what was considered the duo's breakthrough album, Heaven, including the duo's first R&B chart hit, "Celebrate New Life", which reached number 25 on the chart in 1989 and in which Houston was prominently featured in the music video. The success of the track later won the trio a 1990 Stellar Award. Houston and the sibling duo also performed the song "Hold Up the Light", their second song together on the album, on television in a couple of occasions such as the NAACP Image Awards and The Arsenio Hall Show.

Houston continued to contribute vocals on the duo's subsequent follow-up albums, including Different Lifestyles (1991). In 1995, Houston began filming on her second feature film, Waiting to Exhale, which focused on the lives of four successful upper middle class African American women who were also best friends. Though she initially refused to record music for the album following the huge global success of the soundtrack of her debut film, The Bodyguard, Houston was eventually convinced by the soundtrack's main producer Babyface to contribute a few songs.

As executive producer of the album, Houston hired several established black female contemporary artists to perform on the album, including Brandy, Mary J. Blige, Toni Braxton, Aretha Franklin and Chaka Khan among others. Houston and Babyface agreed to compose a song titled "Count On Me" for the soundtrack and decided the song would be better as a duet between Houston and Winans after the duo performed the Aretha Franklin-arranged version of "Bridge Over Troubled Water" at the VH1 Honors in June 1995.

The song's subject about friendship was connected to the film as well as the real-life bond between Houston and Winans. Houston's elder brother, Michael, became a third collaborator after suggesting a lyric change. The duet would be Winans' first recording away from her work with her brother BeBe as the singer was working on her solo debut album that year, Alone in His Presence.

== Critical reception ==
AllMusic editor Craig Lytle wrote, "She (Whitney) teams with Cece Winans on the inspirational duet "Count on Me", and both accomplished singers raise all hopes with their comforting vocals." A reviewer from Billboard deemed the song "torchy". The magazine's Larry Flick commented, "The touch of superstar producer Babyface is, as always, unmistakable, and he excels with this song's lush string arrangement. Vocally, Houston dominates the track, though Winans makes a strong-enough impression that those who have yet to hear her fine recordings will yearn to hear more. A buddy song for the diva generation that is destined to saturate pop radio airwaves into the spring."

Gil L. Robertson IV from Cash Box picked it as a "standout track" of the soundtrack album. Chicago Tribune editor Greg Kot felt that Winans's is one of the few voices on the album that sounds enraptured. British magazine Music Week rated it four out of five, adding, "a slightly lethargic ballad from the Waiting To Exhale soundtrack but, since everything Houston touches turns to gold, put your money on this reaching the Top 10." Gary Darling from The Orlando Sentinel commented that "with its swelling choruses and shouted pledges of friendship", the song "is infused with We Are the World earnestness and overkill, but the performances save it from being too treacly".

== Chart performance ==
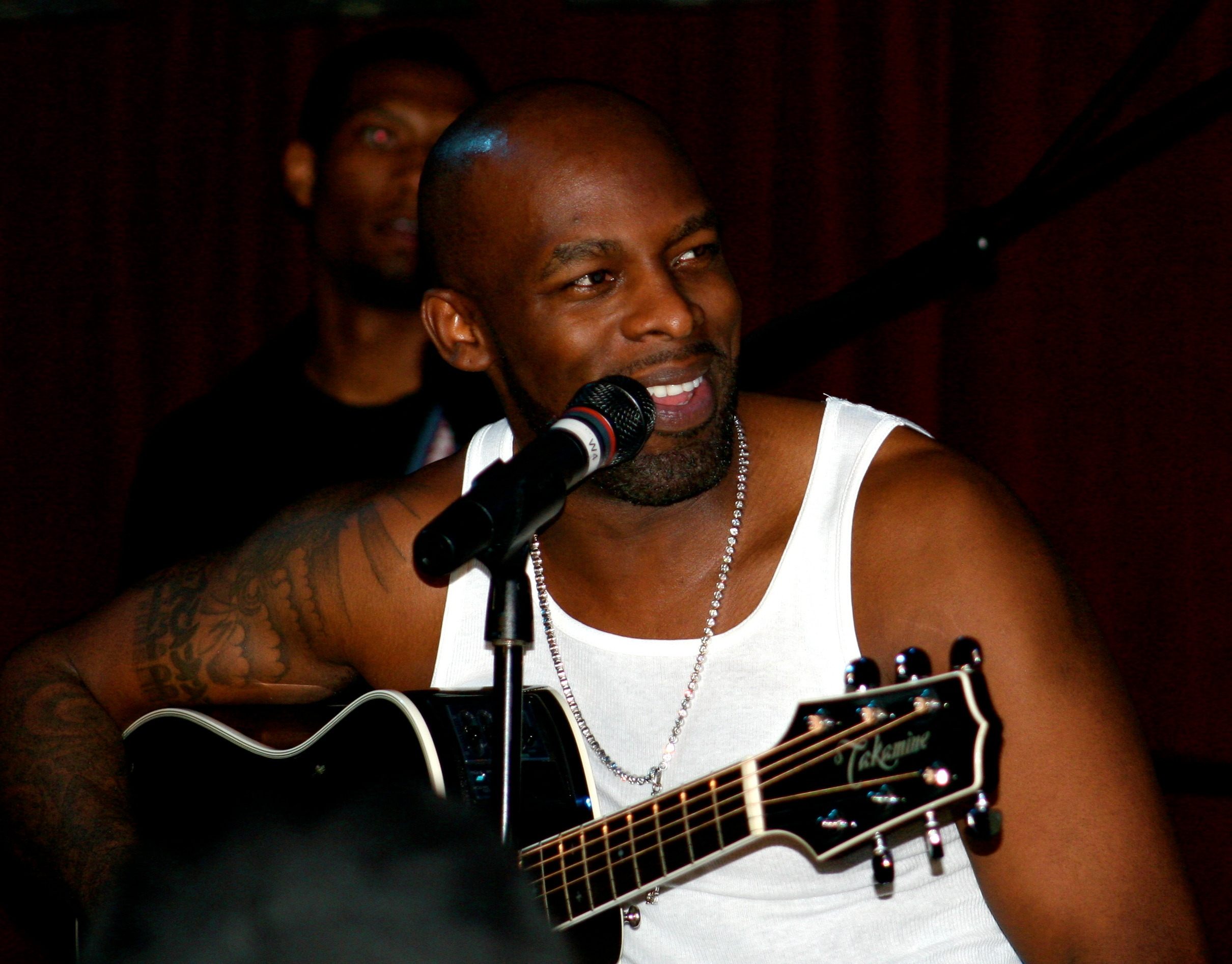
"Count on Me" replaced Joe's "All the Things (Your Man Won't Do)" from the top spot of the Adult R&B Songs chart.

Not too long after the duet was released in March 1996, the song entered the Billboard Hot 100 on the issue dated March 23, 1996 at number 32, becoming the second biggest debut of that week after the Beatles' "Real Love". Five weeks later, it entered the top ten of the chart for the issue dated April 20, 1996. Just three weeks later, the song reached its peak of number eight on the chart for the issue dated May 4, 1996. It would spend seven weeks inside the top ten of the chart and spend a cumulative total of 20 weeks on the chart.

On the same week of March 23, 1996, the duet entered the Hot R&B Singles chart at number 11, becoming the "Hot Shot Debut" of the week. It entered the top ten of the chart the following week (March 30). Five weeks later, it made its peak at number 7 for the issue also dated May 4, 1996. It would spend eight weeks inside the top ten on that chart, a week longer than on the pop charts and accumulating 20 weeks there as well.

On the March 16, 1996 issue of Billboard, the song debuted at number 23 on the Adult Contemporary charts. In its third week (March 30), the song reached the top ten. In the issue dated May 4, 1996, same week the song reached its peaks on the pop and R&B charts, the song peaked at number four on the chart. It would spend 17 of its 26 weeks on the chart inside the top ten.

On the week of June 15, 1996, in its sixteenth week on the chart, the ballad topped the Adult R&B Songs chart for a week, replacing Joe's "All the Things (Your Man Won't Do)" at the top spot and became Houston's second number one on the chart after "Exhale (Shoop Shoop)" and Winans' first, and to date, only number one on that chart.

The song was notable as being the first and only top ten duet of Houston's career. Prior to its release, Houston had charted twice as a featured duet vocalist on 1980s singles by Teddy Pendergrass and Aretha Franklin on the songs, "Hold Me" and "It Isn't, It Wasn't, It Ain't Never Gonna Be" respectively, but both songs had peaked below the top 40 and were moderately successful by comparison. It would be one of only two Houston collaborations to make the top ten, the second being "Heartbreak Hotel", with Faith Evans and Kelly Price as featured guest partners. Her second hit duet, "When You Believe", with Mariah Carey, peaked at number 15, falling short of reaching the top ten in its initial run.

The song was one of the best-selling singles of the year in the United States, selling over 800,000 copies by December. On May 1, 1996, the single was certified gold for selling half a million copies. On June 25, 2025, it was certified platinum for digital sales and stream-equivalent copies of a million units alone in the country.

Outside the US, its success was more moderate. In Canada, the song peaked at number 31. It also reached the top 40 in Iceland, Austria, the Netherlands, Switzerland and New Zealand. Its biggest international success was in the UK where it entered and peaked at number 12 on the chart for the week ending February 24, 1996, eventually spending nine weeks on the chart.

== Music video ==
The accompanying music video for the song features Houston and Winans giving a concert performance at Webster Hall in Manhattan, while clips of the Waiting to Exhale feature film are sporadically mixed in.

The "Count on Me" music video peaked at number one on music channels BET, MTV, and VH1. It was the second music video Wayne Isham directed for Houston, having previously directed the singer on her music video for her 1987 hit, "So Emotional".

== References in pop culture ==
On a Valentine's Day episode of Sister, Sister, the three principal actors: Tia Mowry, Tamera Mowry and Marques Houston, sing the song at a karaoke bar. They sing the first two verses and the chorus.

== Awards and accolades ==
At the 1997 Grammy Awards, the song was nominated for two Grammys -- Best Pop Collaboration with Vocals and Best Song Written for Visual Media, losing to "When I Fall in Love" by Natalie Cole and Nat King Cole and "Because You Loved Me" by Diane Warren respectively. The latter was Houston's first Grammy nomination as a songwriter.

The song also earned songwriting awards for Houston, Babyface and Houston's brother Michael. At the 1997 ASCAP Pop Awards, Whitney and Michael Houston each won the award for Most Performed Song of the Year while also earning Best Song from a Film honors at the ASCAP Film & TV Awards. Babyface earned a BMI Pop Award for the song.

For the Billboard year-end issue for 1996, "Count on Me" was ranked the 48th best pop song, the 35th best R&B song and the 30th best AC song of the year respectively.

== Track listing ==
- US, CD maxi-single
1. "Count on Me" – 4:26
2. "One Moment in Time" – 4:42
3. "I Know Him So Well" (with Cissy Houston) – 4:30
4. "Hold Up The Light" (with BeBe & CeCe Winans) – 4:52
5. "Jesus Loves Me" – 5:13
- Europe, CD maxi-single
1. "Count on Me" – 4:26
2. "One Moment in Time" – 4:42
3. "I'm Every Woman" (Club Mix Radio Edit) – 4:02

- UK, CD single
1. "Count on Me" – 4:26
2. "Exhale (Shoop Shoop)" – 3:21
3. "Run to You" – 4:22
- Japan, CD maxi-single
1. "Count on Me" – 4:26
2. "One Moment in Time" – 4:42
3. "I'm Every Woman" (Radio Edit) – 4:42
- Australia, CD maxi-single
1. "Count on Me" – 4:26
2. "One Moment in Time" – 4:42
3. "I'm Every Woman" (Club Radio Edit) – 4:42

== Credits and personnel ==
From "Count on Me" CD single liner notes.

"Count on Me"

- Whitney Houston – writer, vocals, vocal arrangement
- Babyface – writer
- Michael Houston – writer
- Babyface – producer
- CeCe Winans – vocals

"One Moment in Time"

- Albert Hammond – writer
- John Bettis – writer
- Narada Michael Walden – producer
- Whitney Houston – vocals, vocal arrangement

"I Know Him So Well"

- Tim Rice – writer
- Benny Andersson – writer
- Björn Ulvaeus – writer
- Narada Michael Walden – producer
- Whitney Houston – vocals
- Cissy Houston – vocals

"Hold Up the Light"

- Percy Bady – writer
- BeBe Winans – writer
- Keith Thomas – producer
- CeCe Winans – vocals
- Whitney Houston – vocals
- BeBe Winans – vocals

"Jesus Loves Me"

- William Batchelder Bradbury – writer
- Anna Bartlett Warner – writer
- BeBe Winans – producer
- Whitney Houston – producer
- Whitney Houston – vocals

== Charts ==
=== Weekly charts ===
Chart (1996–2012)	Peak position
Australia (ARIA)	87
Austria (Ö3 Austria Top 40)	28
Canada Hit Parade (AC/CHR/Rock) (The Record)	31
European Hot 100 Singles (Music & Media)	59
Germany (Media Control Charts)	75
Iceland (Íslenski Listinn Topp 40)	22
Israel (Israeli Singles Chart)	22
Netherlands (Dutch Top 40)	30
Netherlands (Single Top 100)	34
New Zealand (RIANZ)	26
Quebec (ADISQ)	14
South Korea International (Gaon)	147
Switzerland (Schweizer Hitparade)	31
UK Singles (Official Charts)	12
UK Airplay (Music Week)	22
US Billboard Hot 100	8
US Adult Pop Airplay (Billboard)	25
US Adult Contemporary (Billboard)	4
US Hot R&B/Hip-Hop Songs (Billboard)	7
US Adult R&B Songs (Billboard)	1
US Pop Airplay (Billboard)	32
US Rhythmic Airplay (Billboard)	18
US Top 100 Singles (Cash Box)	8
US Top 100 Urban Singles (Cash Box)	5

=== Year-end charts ===
Chart (1996)	Position
US Billboard Hot 100	48
US Adult Contemporary (Billboard)	30
US Hot R&B Singles (Billboard)	35
US Top 40/Rhythm-Crossover (Billboard)	93

== Certifications ==
Region	Certification	Certified units/sales
United States (RIAA)	Platinum	1,000,000
