= Waiting to Exhale =

1995 film by Forest Whitaker

- Theatrical release poster
- Directed by: Forest Whitaker
- Screenplay by: Terry McMillan; Ronald Bass
- Based on: Waiting to Exhale by Terry McMillan
- Produced by: Deborah Schindler; Ezra Swerdlow
- Starring: Whitney Houston; Angela Bassett; Loretta Devine; Lela Rochon
- Cinematography: Toyomichi Kurita
- Edited by: Richard Chew
- Music by: Kenneth "Babyface" Edmonds
- Distributed by: 20th Century Fox
- Release date: December 22, 1995
- Running time: 124 minutes
- Country: United States
- Language: English
- Budget: $16 million
- Box office: $82 million

Waiting to Exhale is a 1995 American romantic comedy-drama film directed by Forest Whitaker (in his feature film directorial debut) and starring Whitney Houston and Angela Bassett. The film was adapted from the 1992 novel of the same name by Terry McMillan. Lela Rochon, Loretta Devine, Dennis Haysbert, Michael Beach, Gregory Hines, Donald Faison, and Mykelti Williamson rounded out the rest of the cast. The original music score was composed by Kenneth "Babyface" Edmonds.

The story centers on four women living in the Phoenix metropolitan area and their relationships with men and one another.

The film was released on December 22, 1995, was a box office success, but not well-received by critics.

== Plot ==
Four friends (Savannah, Robin, Bernadine, and Gloria) living in Phoenix get together frequently to support one another and listen to each other vent about life and love. They each want to be in a romantic relationship, but they each have difficulties finding a good man for different reasons.

Successful television producer Savannah "Vannah" Jackson believes that one day her married lover Kenneth will leave his wife for her. When she later realizes that this will not happen, she determines she must find her own man who will love her for who she really is.

Bernadine "Bernie" Harris abandoned her career and her dreams of having a catering business to instead raise a family and support her husband John in building his business. After 11 years, he announces he is leaving her for a white woman with whom he works, sending her into an emotional tailspin. Enraged, Bernie burns his car, clothes and some of his other belongings, and then sells the rest of his things for a dollar each. So John retaliates by draining their bank accounts. This culminates into a fight over their assets.

Robin Stokes is a high-powered executive and the long-time mistress of married man Russell. After dumping him, she has problems finding someone suitable. Robin has a one-night-stand with someone she meets while out on the town, and another with overweight coworker Michael.

Beauty salon owner Gloria "Glo" Matthews is a single mother. David, her ex-husband and the father of her son Tarik, tells her that he was always bisexual and now realizes he is gay. Gloria eventually falls in love with a new neighbor, Marvin King.

Their situations all resolve themselves for the better. Savannah ends up permanently dumping Kenneth. Bernadine, after several court appearances, gets a large divorce settlement from John and finds love with married civil rights attorney James who has a terminally ill wife at home, but encourages her to pursue her catering dream. Robin ends up pregnant by Russell, but dumps him, and chooses to raise the baby on her own.

Gloria apologizes to Marvin for snapping at him when he suggested that she should let her son Tarik grow up and experience the world. She learns not to be so protective of her son and lets him go on an "Up with People" trip to Spain. She finds love while learning to take care of herself rather than being self-sacrificing in her devotion to her son and her business.

== Cast ==
- Whitney Houston as Savannah "Vannah" Jackson, a successful television producer who, after a few failed relationships, decides to move from Denver, Colorado to Phoenix, Arizona
- Angela Bassett as Bernadine "Bernie" Harris, a mother of two children, Onika and John, with dreams of starting a catering business shelved by her 11-year marriage to her husband, only for him to drop a bomb: he's divorcing her for his white bookkeeper.
- Loretta Devine as Gloria "Glo" Matthews, a beauty salon owner & single mother of Tarik
- Lela Rochon as Robin Stokes, an executive and the long-time mistress of Russell
- Gregory Hines as Marvin King, Gloria's neighbor with whom she falls in love, decides to move from Nevada to Phoenix, Arizona
- Dennis Haysbert as Kenneth Dawkins, Savannah's married lover
- Mykelti Williamson as Troy, Robin's one-time lover
- Michael Beach as John Harris Sr., Bernie's husband who leaves her for a white woman
- Donald Adeosun Faison as Tarik Matthews, Gloria's teenage son
- Leon Robinson as Russell, Robin's long-time married lover
- Wendell Pierce as Michael Davenport, Robin's co-worker and one-night stand
- Jeffrey D. Sams as Lionel, Savannah's New Year's Eve date
- Jazz Raycole as Onika Harris, Bernadine & John Sr.'s daughter
- Brandon Hammond as John Harris Jr., Bernadine & John Sr.'s son
- Kenya Moore as Denise, Lionel's "friend" who sees Savannah as a rival
- Lamont Johnson as Joseph, hairstylist at Gloria's salon
- Starletta DuPois as "Ma", Savannah's mother who wants her daughter with a man, preferably Kenneth
- Luis Sharpe as Herbert
- Kelly Preston as Kathleen, John Sr.'s bookkeeper for whom he's leaving his wife Bernadine (uncredited)
- Wesley Snipes as James Wheeler, a civil rights attorney with whom Bernadine shares an intimate moment (uncredited)
- Giancarlo Esposito as David Matthews, Gloria's ex-husband and father of Tarik, who comes out as gay. (uncredited)
- Theodore (Theo) Mizuhara as On Air D.J.

== Production ==
=== Filming ===
Parts of the film were shot at Monument Valley in Utah as well as Chandler, Fountain Hills, Phoenix and Paradise Valley in Arizona.

== Music ==
The soundtrack album to the film features exclusively female African-American artists. The soundtrack includes the number-one hit songs "Exhale (Shoop Shoop)", sung by the film's star, Whitney Houston, and "Let It Flow" by Toni Braxton as well as "Not Gon' Cry" by Mary J. Blige, "Sittin' Up in My Room" by Brandy, and "Count on Me" by Whitney Houston and CeCe Winans, all of which reached the top ten of Billboard's Hot 100 chart. The soundtrack also reached the top of the Billboard 200 and Top R&B/Hip-Hop Albums in January 1996 and was certified 7× platinum by the RIAA.

== Reception ==
=== Box office ===
Waiting to Exhale was a financial success, opening at number one at the North American box office and grossing $14.1 million its first weekend of release. In total, the film grossed $67.05 million in North America, and $14.4 million internationally, for a total worldwide gross of $81.45 million. Its widest release was just over 1,400 theatres, and it was the 26th highest-grossing film of 1995.

=== Critical response ===
Upon release, the film received mixed reviews from critics. Film critic Susan Stark from The Detroit News stated, "For all the pleasure there is in seeing effective, great-looking black women grappling with major life issues on screen, Waiting to Exhale is an uneven piece." Reviewer Liam Lacey from The Daily Globe and Mail wrote of the film, "[It] never escapes the queasy aura of Melrose Place: just another story about naive people with small problems." However, film critic Roger Ebert positively reviewed the film, stating that it is "an escapist fantasy that women in the audience can enjoy by musing, 'I wish I had her problems'—and her car, house, wardrobe, figure and men, even wrong men." The film is notable for having an all-African-American cast. The Los Angeles Times called it a "social phenomenon". The film received a 56% approval rating at review aggregator website Rotten Tomatoes, based on 34 reviews, with an average rating of 5.7/10. The site's consensus states: "Waiting to Exhale looks at life's ups and downs from an underseen perspective -- albeit one that's poorly served by uneven acting and a sporadically interesting story."

=== Legacy and impact ===
In the book Is Marriage for White People? writer and Stanford Law School professor Ralph Richard Banks states that the film is a perfect example of the problems African-American women have in finding serious relationships.

In its writeup on the film 30 years after its release in December 2025, NPR compared the film to the popular HBO TV show, Sex and the City, implying that the show took its premise of four successful women struggling with relationships with men from Waiting to Exhale.

=== Accolades ===
- Image Awards
  - Outstanding Lead Actress in a Motion Picture:
    - (Angela Bassett) Winner
    - (Whitney Houston) Nominated
  - Outstanding Soundtrack: Winner
  - Outstanding Motion Picture: Winner
  - Outstanding Lead Actor in a Motion Picture: (Gregory Hines) Nominated
  - Outstanding Supporting Actress in a Motion Picture:
    - (Loretta Devine) Winner
    - (Lela Rochon) Nominated
- MTV Movie Awards
  - Best Female Breakthrough Performance: (Lela Rochon) Nominated
  - Best Song from a Movie:
    - Whitney Houston - "Exhale (Shoop Shoop)"
    - Brandy - "Sittin' Up in My Room"

== Proposed sequel ==
Interviewed in the spring of 2011 on an episode of The Talk, Angela Bassett confirmed that a sequel was in the planning stages, with all the female principals signed on to star, and Whitaker returning to direct. The film would supposedly be based on McMillan's 2010 follow-up novel, Getting to Happy; McMillan was adapting the book to screenplay. However, the 2012 death of Whitney Houston halted plans for a sequel starring all four of the original leads.

== Television series ==
In November 2020, it was reported that ABC was developing a television series adaptation of film. The series would be produced by 20th Television with Lee Daniels as executive producer, under a deal of Daniels at 20th Television.
