= Sittin' Up in My Room =

1995 single by Brandy

Single by Brandy

from the album Waiting to Exhale: Original Soundtrack Album
- B-side: "My Love, Sweet Love" (Patti LaBelle)
- Released: December 1995
- Studio: The Tracken Place (Beverly Hills, California)
- Genre: R&B
- Length: 4:52 (album version); 4:00 (radio edit)
- Label: Arista
- Songwriter: Babyface
- Producer: Babyface

Brandy singles chronology
"Brokenhearted" (1995)	"Sittin' Up in My Room" (1995)	"Missing You" (1996)

Music video
- "Sittin' Up in My Room" on YouTube

"Sittin' Up in My Room" is a song by American recording artist Brandy. It was written and produced by Babyface and recorded by Norwood for the soundtrack of the 1995 film Waiting to Exhale, starring Whitney Houston and Angela Bassett. The song was among five of the album's singles and peaked at number two on the US Billboard Hot 100, seeing Norwood's furthest commercial success on the chart at that time. The bass intro is similar to that of the riff performed by bassist Larry Graham, of Sly and the Family Stone, on their hit "Thank You (Falettinme Be Mice Elf Agin)", and its remix featuring LL Cool J contains a sample of "Haven't You Heard" by Patrice Rushen.

"Sittin' Up in My Room" was nominated for Best R&B Song and Best R&B Female Vocal Performance at the 39th Grammy Awards. It was performed on several television and award show ceremonies, such as Late Show with David Letterman, the 23rd Annual American Music Awards, the 1996 Soul Train Awards, the 39th Annual Grammy Awards, and the 2015 Soul Train Music Awards. A music video was also filmed, depicting Brandy keeping herself penned up in a retro, brightly colored room after her friend tells her that her love interest is joining the party downstairs. Actor Donald Faison appears as her love interest in the video, directed by Hype Williams. It won the award for Best Song from a Movie and was nominated for Best Video from a Film at the 1996 MTV Awards. The song has since been performed on several awards shows and Norwood's concerts and tours, including the 1998 Never Say Never World Tour and the 2016 Slayana World Tour.

== Background and recording ==
"Sittin' Up in My Room" was written and produced by Kenneth "Babyface" Edmonds. Edmonds also helmed the drum programming (along with the production duo Trackmasters), synthesizer, and wurlitzer sounds, while Michael Thompson played the guitar. "Bassy" Bob Brockmann mixed the track; recording was overseen by Brad Gilderman. The record was from a number of songs Edmonds specifically penned for the soundtrack of Forest Whitaker's 1995 romantic drama film Waiting to Exhale, starring Whitney Houston and Angela Bassett. Musically, songs from fellow R&B singer Aaliyah's debut album Age Ain't Nothing but a Number (1994) served as an inspiration while starting the song idea for "Sittin' Up in My Room". Edmonds finished most of the demo on his Los Angeles house, before Norwood came over for recording. Commenting on the recording process, Norwood later elaborated: "I was going crazy with my vocal runs because I really wanted to impress Babyface. I knew how to pull back, but it was one of those things where I thought, 'This is my chance!' I always wanted to work with Babyface going back to ['Tender Lover'] [...] Actually, he was the most legendary producer that I had worked with to that point. So when I was recording 'Sittin' Up In My Room,' I was thinking, 'This is my chance to show Babyface that I could sing!' But he was like, ‘You don’t have to do all of that. Just sing, baby. Just keep your vocals simple.'"

== Reception ==
=== Critical reception ===
Craig Lytle from AllMusic wrote that "with a Sly Stone twist, Babyface concocts a laid-back funk groove for "Sittin' up in My Room," which features the humble vocals of Brandy. Though the song does not allow her to unwind with her higher notes, it does, however, reveal her lower octaves." Larry Flick from Billboard magazine felt it "places endlessly charming ingenue Brandy at the center of a wickedly infectious pop/funk confection." He added, "The chorus is instantly memorable and a perfect match for Brandy's unaffected, soulful style." In 2014, Complex magazine ranked the single 39th on its list of the 50 R&B Songs of the 1990s. Cheo Hodari Coker from the Los Angeles Times praised Babyface for his production on the song, stating "Babyface's funky-but-restrained background track is the real star of this jam. Using a pleasant mixture of plunking bass and synthesizer chords, [the song] proves that he has a grabbag of styles at his disposal." British magazine Music Week gave it a score of four out of five, calling it "the one that could finally break Brandy into the big time. Funky." Alan Jones added, "A soft swing shuffle with a delightful hook, it is the sort of confection that eats the opposition in the American R&B chart, and should do pretty well here, too." David Sinclair from The Times viewed "Sittin' Up in My Room" as "a quietly smouldering slice of swingbeat-funk performed with a firm, sensual touch." He also remarked that "she sings in a deep, velvety voice that would have most men fumbling for their key-pads there and then."

=== Commercial performance ===
Released as the second single from the soundtrack, "Sittin' Up in My Room" debuted at number forty-six and number thirteen, on the US Billboard Hot 100 Singles chart and Hot R&B Singles chart, the issue date of December 30, 1995, respectively. The single reached the number two on the Hot R&B Singles chart, the issue of February 17, 1996, and stayed there three consecutive weeks. It also peaked at number two on the Hot 100 Singles chart, staying on the chart for a total of thirty-three weeks, being her longest charting song on the chart. "Sittin' Up in My Room" earned a platinum award by the Recording Industry Association of America (RIAA) on May 23, 1996, with 1,000,000 copies sold.

== Music video ==
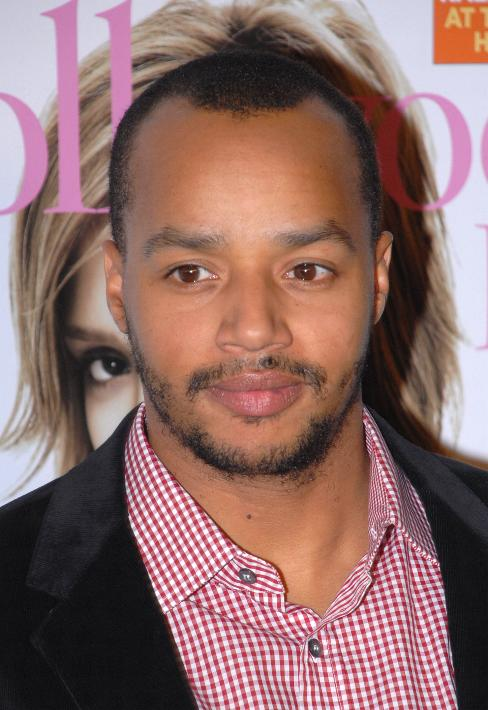
Waiting to Exhale actor Faison appears in the video.

The accompanying music video for "Sittin' Up in My Room" was directed by Hype Williams. Norwood declared filming as "fun" as she had a "great relationship" with Williams at that time, having previously worked with him on the videos for the Hip–Hop Remix of "I Wanna Be Down" and her second single "Baby". Actor Donald Faison appears in the video; Faison played the son of Loretta Devine's character Gloria in Waiting to Exhale. Commenting on the result, Norwood remarked: "It was a great video, dance and everything. It was dope."

== Track listings ==
- US CD and cassette single, Japanese mini-CD single
1. "Sittin' Up in My Room" (album version) – 4:52
2. "My Love, Sweet Love" (performed by Patti LaBelle) – 4:21
- US 7-inch single and UK cassette single
1. "Sittin' Up in My Room" (radio edit) – 3:53
2. "My Love, Sweet Love" (performed by Patti LaBelle) – 4:21
- US remix CD and cassette single
1. "Sittin' Up in My Room" (Doug Rasheed remix featuring LL Cool J) – 3:53
2. "Sittin' Up in My Room" (album version) – 4:52
- US 12-inch single

A1. "Sittin' Up in My Room" (Doug Rasheed remix) – 4:52
A2. "Sittin' Up in My Room" (Doug Rasheed remix instrumental) – 4:52
A3. "Sittin' Up in My Room" (album version) – 4:52
B1. "Sittin' Up in My Room" (Doug Rasheed hip hop remix) – 4:52
B2. "Sittin' Up in My Room" (Doug Rasheed hip hop instrumental) – 4:52
B3. "Sittin' Up in My Room" (acappella) – 5:16

- US maxi-CD and maxi-cassette single
1. "Sittin' Up in My Room" (Doug Rasheed remix) – 4:52
2. "Sittin' Up in My Room" (Doug Rasheed hip hop remix) – 4:52
3. "Sittin' Up in My Room" (Doug Rasheed remix instrumental) – 4:52
4. "Sittin' Up in My Room" (Doug Rasheed hip hop instrumental) – 4:52
5. "Sittin' Up in My Room" (album version) – 4:52
- UK CD1 and Australian CD single
1. "Sittin' Up in My Room" (radio edit) – 3:53
2. "Sittin' Up in My Room" (LP version) – 4:52
3. "My Love, Sweet Love" (performed by Patti LaBelle) – 4:21
- UK CD2
1. "Sittin' Up in My Room" (radio edit) – 3:53
2. "Sittin' Up in My Room" (Doug Rasheed remix) – 4:52
3. "Sittin' Up in My Room" (Doug Rasheed hip hop remix) – 4:52
4. "Sittin' Up in My Room" (a cappella) – 5:10

== Charts ==
=== Weekly charts ===
Chart (1996)	Peak position
Australia (ARIA)	99
Canada Contemporary Hit Radio (The Record)	9
Canada Top Singles (RPM)	31
Canada Dance/Urban (RPM)	5
Europe (European Dance Radio)	16
Iceland (Íslenski Listinn Topp 40)	23
Netherlands (Dutch Top 40 Tipparade)	17
Netherlands (Single Top 100 Tipparade)	14
New Zealand (Recorded Music NZ)	6
Scottish Singles Sales (Official Charts)	65
Sweden (Sverigetopplistan)	60
UK Singles (Official Charts)	30
UK Hip Hop/R&B (Official Charts)	3
US Billboard Hot 100	2
US Adult Pop Airplay (Billboard)	38
US Dance Singles Sales (Billboard)	2
US Hot R&B/Hip-Hop Songs (Billboard)	2
US Pop Airplay (Billboard)	13
US Rhythmic Airplay (Billboard)	1
US Cash Box Top 100	1

=== Year-end charts ===
Chart (1996)	Position
Canada Dance/Urban (RPM)	47
US Billboard Hot 100	16
US Hot R&B Singles (Billboard)	8
US Top 40/Mainstream (Billboard)	34
US Top 40/Rhythm-Crossover (Billboard)	4

== Certifications ==
Region	Certification	Certified units/sales
New Zealand (RMNZ)	Gold	5,000^{*}
United States (RIAA)	Platinum	1,000,000
^{*} Sales figures based on certification alone.

== Release history ==
Region	Date	Format(s)	Label(s)	Ref.
United States	December 1995	—N/a	Arista	
United Kingdom	January 22, 1996	CD; cassette	Arista; BMG	
United States	January 30, 1996	Contemporary hit radio	Arista	
Japan	February 21, 1996	Mini-CD	Arista	

== Cover versions ==
In 1997, jazz fusion/contemporary jazz group Pieces of a Dream offered their take on the album Pieces.
