= Billboard Year-End Hot R&B Singles of 1995 =

American music chart

This is a list of Billboard magazine's Top Hot R&B Singles of 1995.

No.	Title	Artist(s)
1	"Creep"	TLC
2	"This Is How We Do It"	Montell Jordan
3	"One More Chance / Stay with Me"	The Notorious B.I.G.
4	"If You Love Me"	Brownstone
5	"Candy Rain"	Soul for Real
6	"Don't Take It Personal (Just One of Dem Days)"	Monica
7	"Freak like Me"	Adina Howard
8	"Before I Let You Go"	Blackstreet
9	"Boombastic" / "In the Summertime"	Shaggy
10	"Baby"	Brandy
11	"Can't You See"	Total featuring The Notorious B.I.G.
12	"On Bended Knee"	Boyz II Men
13	"He's Mine"	MoKenStef
14	"Fantasy"	Mariah Carey
15	"I'll Be There for You/You're All I Need to Get By"	Method Man featuring Mary J. Blige
16	"Waterfalls"	TLC
17	"Ask of You"	Raphael Saadiq
18	"Someone to Love"	Jon B. featuring Babyface
19	"Freek'n You"	Jodeci
20	"Practice What You Preach"	Barry White
21	"Big Poppa" / "Warning"	The Notorious B.I.G.
22	"I Wanna Be Down"	Brandy
23	"Water Runs Dry"	Boyz II Men
24	"I Apologize"	Anita Baker
25	"You Used to Love Me"	Faith Evans
26	"Brown Sugar"	D'Angelo
27	"Dear Mama"	2Pac
28	"I Like"	Kut Klose
29	"Crazy Love"	Brian McKnight
30	"Gangsta's Paradise"	Coolio
31	"I Got 5 on It"	Luniz
32	"Red Light Special"	TLC
33	"You Are Not Alone"	Michael Jackson
34	"This Lil' Game We Play"	Subway featuring 702
35	"'Til You Do Me Right"	After 7
36	"Think of You"	Usher
37	"Best Friend"	Brandy
38	"Tell Me"	Groove Theory
39	"Grapevyne"	Brownstone
40	"Brokenhearted"	Brandy
41	"Be Happy"	Mary J. Blige
42	"Keep Their Heads Ringin'"	Dr. Dre
43	"For Your Love"	Stevie Wonder
44	"Feels So Good"	Xscape
45	"We Must Be in Love"	Pure Soul
46	"Every Little Thing I Do"	Soul for Real
47	"I Belong to You" / "How Many Ways"	Toni Braxton
48	"Heaven"	Solo
49	"Here Comes the Hotstepper"	Ini Kamoze
50	"Emotions"	H-Town
51	"Player's Anthem"	Junior M.A.F.I.A.
52	"Sentimental"	Deborah Cox
53	"Sugar Hill"	AZ
54	"Foolin' Around"	Changing Faces
55	"Come On"	Barry White
56	"Give It 2 You"	Da Brat
57	"Who Can I Run To"	Xscape
58	"Can I Stay with You"	Karyn White
59	"Joy"	Blackstreet
60	"U Will Know"	Black Men United
61	"I Wanna Love Like That"	Tony Thompson
62	"Scream"	Michael Jackson and Janet Jackson
63	"On the Down Low"	Brian McKnight
64	"Runaway"	Janet Jackson
65	"Constantly"	Immature
66	"I Hate U"	Prince
67	"Answering Service"	Gerald Levert
68	"Feel Me Flow"	Naughty by Nature
69	"Get Down"	Craig Mack
70	"Just Roll"	Fabu
71	"I Miss You"	N II U
72	"Shame"	Zhané
73	"Shy Guy"	Diana King
74	"I Seen a Man Die"	Scarface
75	"How High"	Method Man & Redman
76	"1st of tha Month"	Bone Thugs-n-Harmony
77	"Can't Help Myself"	Gerald Levert
78	"So Many Tears"	2Pac
79	"Every Day of the Week"	Jade
80	"Already Missing You"	Gerald Levert and Eddie Levert
81	"You Want This" / "70's Love Groove"	Janet Jackson
82	"I'm Goin' Down"	Mary J. Blige
83	"Thank You"	Boyz II Men
84	"Always and Forever"	Luther Vandross
85	"Where I Wanna Be Boy"	Miss Jones
86	"Freedom (Theme from Panther)"	Various artists
87	"If You Think You're Lonely Now"	K-Ci
88	"Old School Lovin'"	Chanté Moore
89	"Never Gonna Let You Go"	Tina Moore
90	"Woman to Woman"	Jewell
91	"When U Cry I Cry"	Jesse
92	"Flava in Ya Ear"	Craig Mack
93	"Froggy Style"	Nuttin' Nyce
94	"Next Time"	Gladys Knight
95	"The Way That You Love"	Vanessa Williams
96	"Sprinkle Me"	E-40 featuring Suga-T
97	"You Bring Me Joy" / "I Love You"	Mary J. Blige
98	"Somethin' 4 da Honeyz"	Montell Jordan
99	"Let's Talk About It"	Men at Large
100	"The Most Beautifullest Thing in This World"	Keith Murray

== See also ==
- 1995 in music
- Billboard Year-End Hot 100 singles of 1995
- Billboard Year-End Hot Rap Singles of 1995
- List of number-one R&B singles of 1995 (U.S.)
