= Billboard Year-End Hot 100 singles of 1995 =

Ranking of recorded music

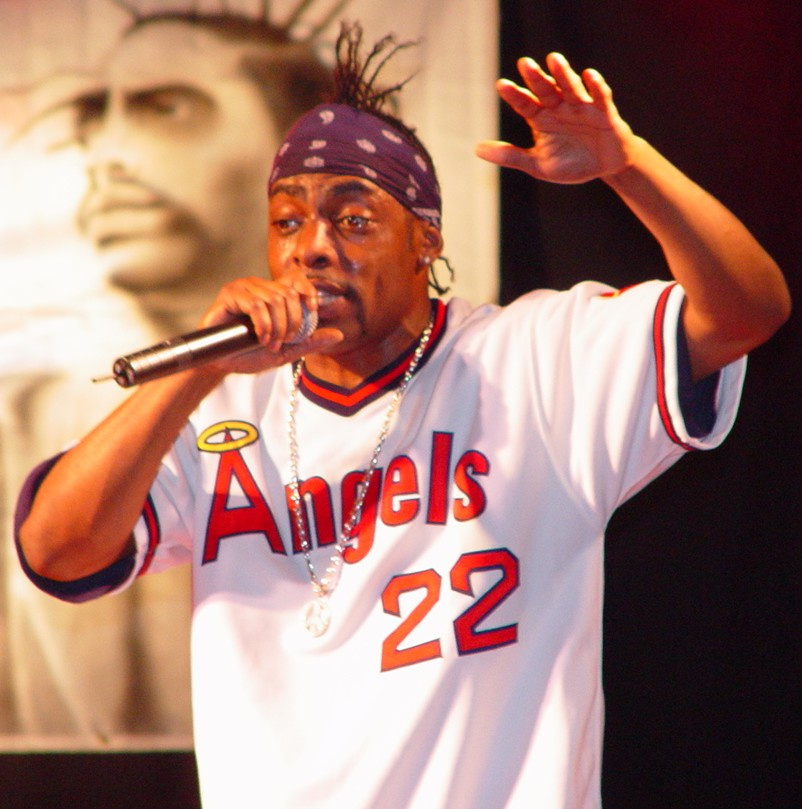
"Gangsta's Paradise" by Coolio (pictured) was the number one song on the Year-End chart after spending 12 weeks in the top-two of the Hot 100, three of which were spent at number one.

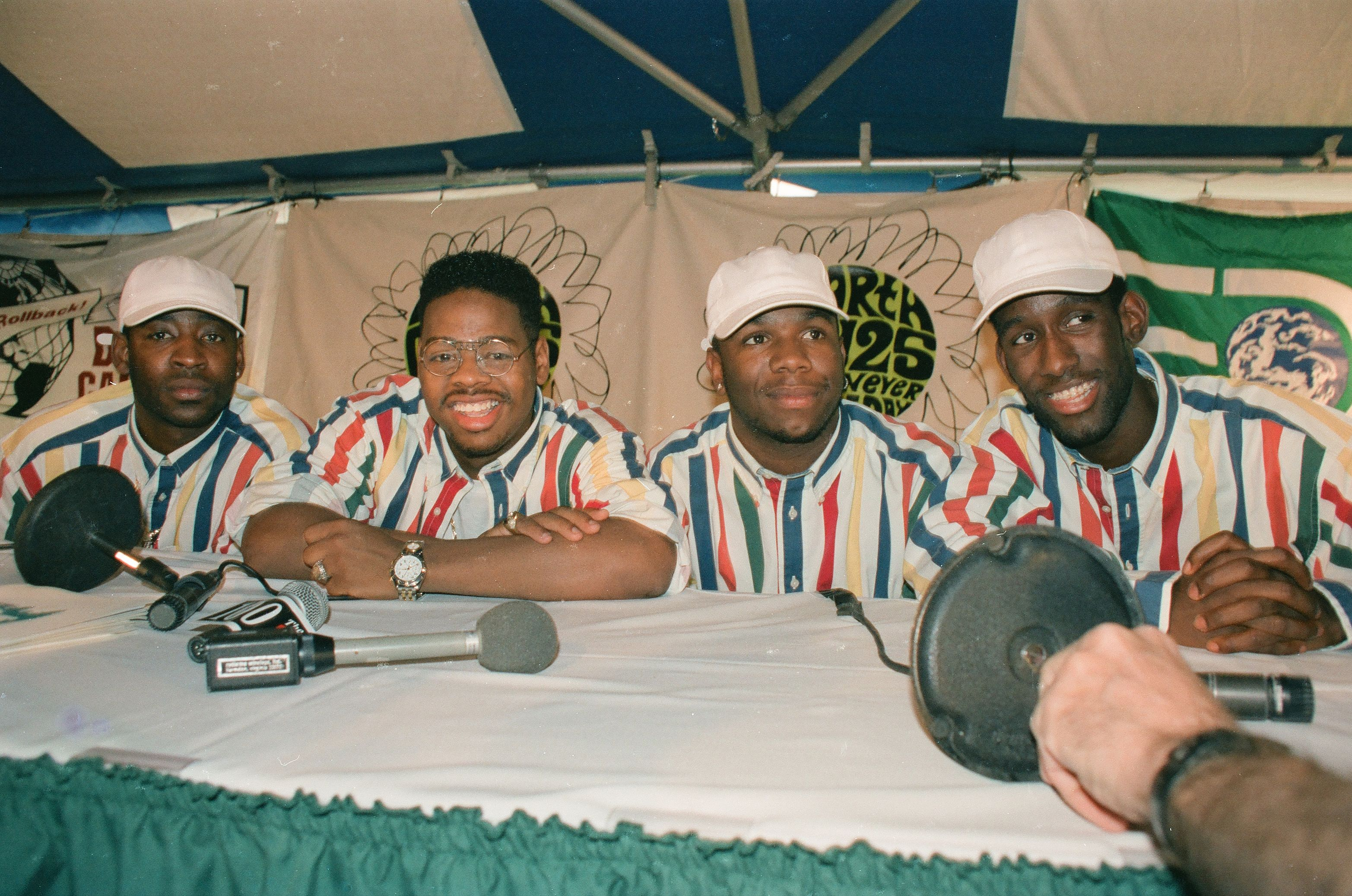
Boyz II Men (pictured) had four songs on the Year-End chart, tying them with Brandy and The Notorious B.I.G. for the most songs on the chart. These included the Hot 100 number one "On Bended Knee" at number five, "Water Runs Dry" at number 12, "I'll Make Love to You" at number 50, and "Thank You" at number 94.

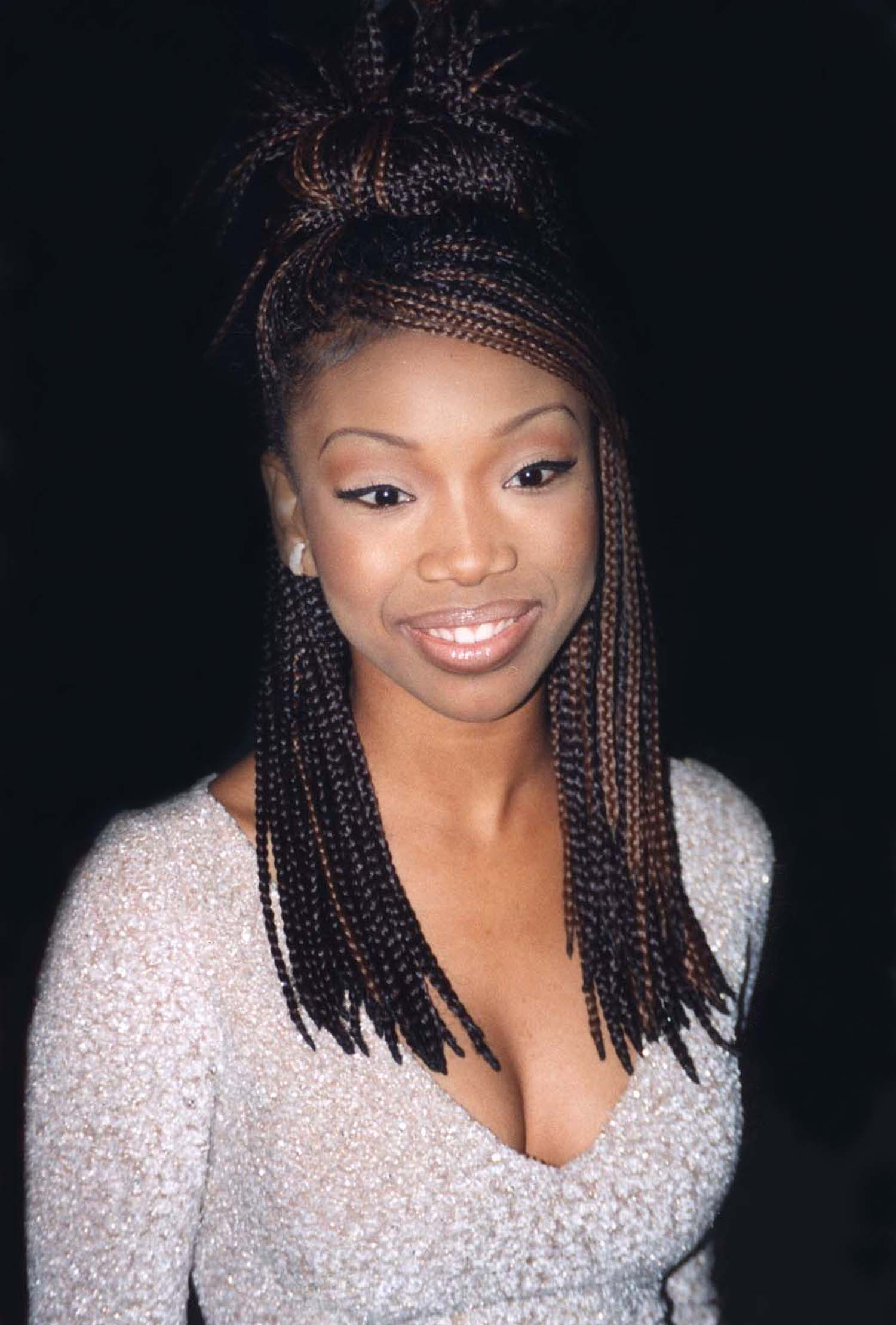
Brandy (pictured) tied for most songs on the Year-End chart with four, all of which were taken from her self-titled debut album: "Baby" at number 37, "I Wanna Be Down" at number 49, "Brokenhearted" at number 77, and "Best Friend" at number 98.

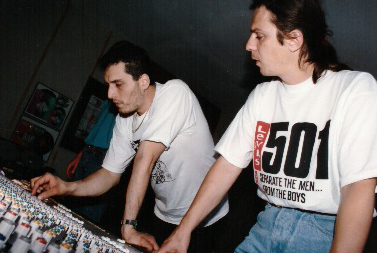
Three songs by Real McCoy, which consisted of producers Frank Hassas and Juergen Wind (pictured), were on the Year-End chart. Two were in the top-40 ("Another Night" at number six and "Run Away" at number 38) and their song "Come and Get Your Love" appeared at number 68.

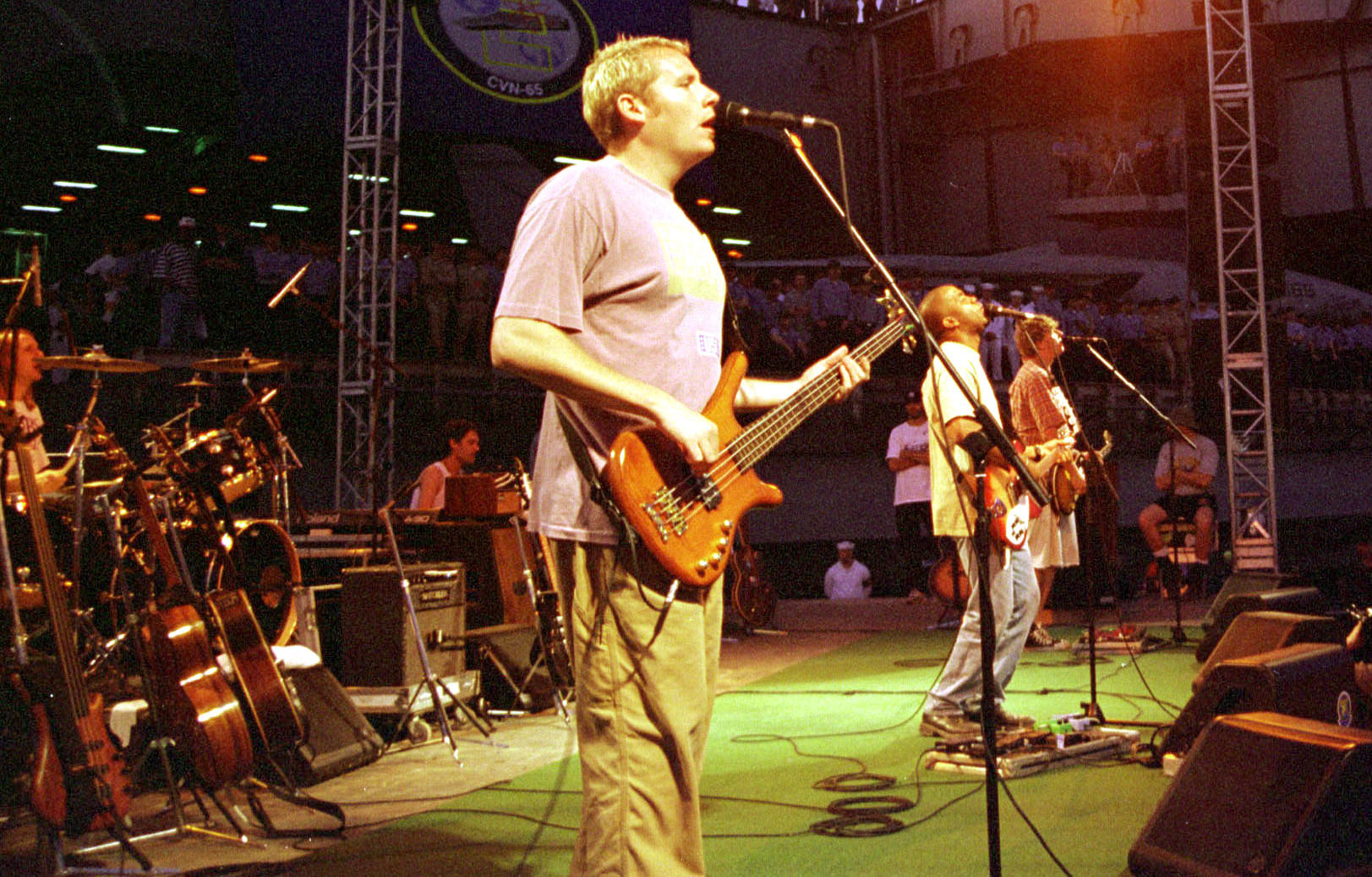
Hootie & The Blowfish's songs "Hold My Hand", "Let Her Cry", and "Only Wanna Be with You" all appeared in the top-40 of the Year-End chart.

This is a list of Billboard magazine's Top Hot 100 songs of 1995.

No.	Title	Artist(s)
1	"Gangsta's Paradise"	Coolio featuring L.V.
2	"Waterfalls"	TLC
3	"Creep"	TLC
4	"Kiss from a Rose"	Seal
5	"On Bended Knee"	Boyz II Men
6	"Another Night"	Real McCoy
7	"Fantasy"	Mariah Carey
8	"Take a Bow"	Madonna
9	"Don't Take It Personal (Just One of Dem Days)"	Monica
10	"This Is How We Do It"	Montell Jordan
11	"I Know"	Dionne Farris
12	"Water Runs Dry"	Boyz II Men
13	"Freak Like Me"	Adina Howard
14	"Run-Around"	Blues Traveler
15	"I Can Love You Like That"	All-4-One
16	"Have You Ever Really Loved a Woman?"	Bryan Adams
17	"Always"	Bon Jovi
18	"Boombastic" / "In the Summertime"	Shaggy
19	"Total Eclipse of the Heart"	Nicki French
20	"You Gotta Be"	Des'ree
21	"You Are Not Alone"	Michael Jackson
22	"Hold My Hand"	Hootie & the Blowfish
23	"One More Chance/Stay with Me"	The Notorious B.I.G.
24	"Here Comes the Hotstepper"	Ini Kamoze
25	"Candy Rain"	Soul for Real
26	"Let Her Cry"	Hootie & the Blowfish
27	"I Believe"	Blessid Union of Souls
28	"Red Light Special"	TLC
29	"Runaway"	Janet Jackson
30	"Strong Enough"	Sheryl Crow
31	"Colors of the Wind"	Vanessa Williams
32	"Someone to Love"	Jon B. featuring Babyface
33	"Only Wanna Be with You"	Hootie & the Blowfish
34	"If You Love Me"	Brownstone
35	"In the House of Stone and Light"	Martin Page
36	"I Got 5 on It"	Luniz
37	"Baby"	Brandy
38	"Run Away"	Real McCoy
39	"As I Lay Me Down"	Sophie B. Hawkins
40	"He's Mine"	MoKenStef
41	"December"	Collective Soul
42	"I'll Be There for You/You're All I Need to Get By"	Method Man featuring Mary J. Blige
43	"Shy Guy"	Diana King
44	"I'm the Only One"	Melissa Etheridge
45	"Every Little Thing I Do"	Soul for Real
46	"Before I Let You Go"	Blackstreet
47	"Big Poppa" / "Warning"	The Notorious B.I.G.
48	"Sukiyaki"	4 P.M.
49	"I Wanna Be Down"	Brandy
50	"I'll Make Love to You"	Boyz II Men
51	"Dear Mama" / "Old School"	2Pac
52	"Hold On"	Jamie Walters
53	"Keep Their Heads Ringin'"	Dr. Dre
54	"The Rhythm of the Night"	Corona
55	"Roll to Me"	Del Amitri
56	"Scream" / "Childhood"	Michael Jackson and Janet Jackson
57	"Freek'n You"	Jodeci
58	"I Wish"	Skee-Lo
59	"Believe"	Elton John
60	"Carnival"	Natalie Merchant
61	"You Don't Know How It Feels"	Tom Petty
62	"Back for Good"	Take That
63	"Tootsee Roll"	69 Boyz
64	"You Want This" / "70's Love Groove"	Janet Jackson
65	"Tell Me"	Groove Theory
66	"Can't You See"	Total featuring The Notorious B.I.G.
67	"All I Wanna Do"	Sheryl Crow
68	"This Lil' Game We Play"	Subway featuring 702
69	"Come and Get Your Love"	Real McCoy
70	"This Ain't a Love Song"	Bon Jovi
71	"Secret"	Madonna
72	"Player's Anthem"	Junior M.A.F.I.A. featuring The Notorious B.I.G.
73	"Feel Me Flow"	Naughty by Nature
74	"Every Day of the Week"	Jade
75	"The Sweetest Days"	Vanessa Williams
76	"Short Dick Man"	20 Fingers featuring Gillette
77	"Brokenhearted"	Brandy
78	"No More I Love You's"	Annie Lennox
79	"You Used to Love Me"	Faith Evans
80	"Constantly"	Immature
81	"Hold Me, Thrill Me, Kiss Me, Kill Me"	U2
82	"100% Pure Love"	Crystal Waters
83	"Ask of You"	Raphael Saadiq
84	"Sugar Hill"	AZ
85	"Good"	Better Than Ezra
86	"Brown Sugar"	D'Angelo
87	"Turn the Beat Around"	Gloria Estefan
88	"'Til You Do Me Right"	After 7
89	"1st of tha Month"	Bone Thugs-n-Harmony
90	"Like the Way I Do" / "If I Wanted To"	Melissa Etheridge
91	"I Live My Life for You"	FireHouse
92	"Dream About You" / "Funky Melody"	Stevie B
93	"Cotton Eye Joe"	Rednex
94	"Thank You"	Boyz II Men
95	"I'll Stand by You"	The Pretenders
96	"I Miss You"	N II U
97	"Give It 2 You"	Da Brat
98	"Best Friend"	Brandy
99	"Misery"	Soul Asylum
100	"Can't Stop Lovin' You"	Van Halen

== See also ==
- 1995 in music
- Billboard Year-End Hot R&B Singles of 1995
- Billboard Year-End Hot Rap Singles of 1995
- List of Billboard Hot 100 number-one singles of 1995
- List of Billboard Hot 100 top-ten singles in 1995
