= List of Billboard Hot 100 top-ten singles in 1995 =

This is a list of singles that charted in the top ten of the Billboard Hot 100 during 1995.

Boyz II Men scored five top ten hits during the year with "I'll Make Love to You", "On Bended Knee", "Water Runs Dry", "Hey Lover", and "One Sweet Day", the most among all other artists.

== Top-ten singles ==
Key

- ↑ – indicates single's top 10 entry was also its Hot 100 debut
- † – indicates Best performing song of the year
- (#) – 1995 Year-end top 10 single position and rank

List of Billboard Hot 100 top ten singles which peaked in 1995
Top ten entry date	Single	Artist(s)	Peak	Peak date	Weeks in top ten	References
Singles from 1994
December 3	"Creep" (#3)	TLC	1	January 28	20	
December 24	"Before I Let You Go"	Blackstreet	7	January 7	8	
December 31	"I'm the Only One"	Melissa Etheridge	8	January 21	5	
December 31	"Tootsee Roll"	69 Boyz	8	January 7	3	
Singles from 1995
January 14	"Take a Bow" (#8)	Madonna	1	February 25	15	
January 21	"Sukiyaki"	4 P.M.	8	February 4	6	
January 28	"You Gotta Be"	Des'ree	5	March 11	10	
February 11	"Baby"	Brandy	4	March 11	9	
February 18	"Candy Rain"	Soul for Real	2	March 18	12	
February 18	"Hold My Hand"	Hootie & The Blowfish	10	February 18	3	
February 25	"If You Love Me"	Brownstone	8	February 25	5	
March 4	"Strong Enough"	Sheryl Crow	5	March 25	11	
March 18	"Big Poppa"	The Notorious B.I.G	6	March 18	7	
March 18	"Red Light Special"	TLC	2	April 15	12	
March 25	"Run Away"	Real McCoy	3	April 8	8	
April 1	"This Is How We Do It" (#10)	Montell Jordan	1	April 15	14	
April 8	"I Know"	Dionne Farris	4	May 6	10	
April 15	"Freak like Me"	Adina Howard	2	May 6	12	
April 22	"Keep Their Heads Ringin'"	Dr. Dre	10	April 22	1	
April 29	"Dear Mama"	2Pac	9	April 29	4	
April 29	"I Believe"	Blessid Union of Souls	8	May 6	8	
May 6	"Water Runs Dry"	Boyz II Men	2	June 17	16	
May 13	"Have You Ever Really Loved a Woman?"	Bryan Adams	1	June 3	12	
May 20	"I'll Be There for You/You're All I Need to Get By"	Method Man featuring Mary J. Blige	3	June 3	8	
May 20	"Total Eclipse of the Heart"	Nicki French	2	June 24	11	
May 27	"Don't Take It Personal (Just One of Dem Days)" (#9)	Monica	2	July 1	14	
June 10	"Let Her Cry"	Hootie & The Blowfish	9	July 8	3	
June 17	"Scream" / "Childhood" ↑	Michael Jackson and Janet Jackson	5	June 17	6	
June 24	"One More Chance" ↑	The Notorious B.I.G. featuring Faith Evans and Mary J. Blige	2	July 15	10	
June 24	"Waterfalls" (#2)	TLC	1	July 8	18	
July 8	"I Can Love You Like That"	All-4-One	5	August 26	15	
July 15	"Run-Around"	Blues Traveler	8	August 5	9	
July 15	"Boombastic" / "In the Summertime"	Shaggy	3	August 19	12	
July 29	"Kiss From a Rose" (#4)	Seal	1	August 26	17	
August 5	"Colors Of The Wind"	Vanessa Williams	4	August 26	7	
August 5	"Someone To Love"	Jon B. featuring Babyface	10	August 5	1	
August 12	"He's Mine"	MoKenStef	7	August 26	4	
August 26	"Gangsta's Paradise" (#1)	Coolio featuring L.V.	1	September 9	22	
September 2	"You Are Not Alone" ↑	Michael Jackson	1	September 2	10	
September 2	"Only Wanna Be With You"	Hootie & The Blowfish	6	October 21	11	
September 9	"I Got 5 on It"	Luniz featuring Michael Marshall	8	September 23	4	
September 16	"Runaway" ↑	Janet Jackson	3	October 21	14	
September 23	"As I Lay Me Down"	Sophie B. Hawkins	6	October 28	9	
September 30	"Fantasy" ↑ (#7)	Mariah Carey	1	September 30	16	
October 14	"Brokenhearted"	Brandy featuring Wanya Morris	9	October 14	2	
October 21	"Tell Me"	Groove Theory	5	November 4	7	
October 28	"Back For Good"	Take That	7	November 11	5	
October 28	"Carnival"	Natalie Merchant	10	October 28	1	
November 4	"Roll To Me"	Del Amitri	10	November 4	1	
November 11	"Who Can I Run To"	Xscape	8	November 18	2	
November 18	"You Remind Me of Something" ↑	R. Kelly	4	November 18	5	
November 25	"Exhale (Shoop Shoop)" ↑	Whitney Houston	1	November 25	15	
November 25	"Hey Lover"	LL Cool J featuring Boyz II Men	3	December 2	14	
November 25	"Diggin' on You"	TLC	5	December 30	9	
December 2	"One Sweet Day" ↑	Mariah Carey and Boyz II Men	1	December 2	19	
December 9	"You'll See" ↑	Madonna	6	December 16	5	
December 23	"I Got Id" ↑	Pearl Jam featuring Neil Young	7	December 23	1	
December 30	"Before You Walk Out of My Life"	Monica	7	December 30	5	

=== 1994 peaks ===
List of Billboard Hot 100 top ten singles in 1995 which peaked in 1994
Top ten entry date	Single	Artist(s)	Peak	Peak date	Weeks in top ten	References
August 20	"I'll Make Love to You"	Boyz II Men	1	August 27	22	
October 8	"Another Night" (#6)	Real McCoy	3	November 12	23	
October 29	"Always"	Bon Jovi	4	December 10	18	
October 29	"Here Comes the Hotstepper"	Ini Kamoze	1	December 17	15	
November 5	"I Wanna Be Down"	Brandy	6	December 31	12	
November 19	"You Want This"	Janet Jackson	8	December 24	7	
November 26	"On Bended Knee" (#5)	Boyz II Men	1	December 3	17	

=== 1996 peaks ===
List of Billboard Hot 100 top ten singles in 1995 which peaked in 1996
Top ten entry date	Single	Artist(s)	Peak	Peak date	Weeks in top ten	References
November 11	"Name"	Goo Goo Dolls	5	January 27	15	
December 23	"Breakfast at Tiffany's"	Deep Blue Something	5	January 20	8	
December 30	"Free as a Bird" ↑	The Beatles	6	January 6	2	

== See also ==
- 1995 in music
- List of Hot 100 number-one singles of 1995 (U.S.)
- Billboard Year-End Hot 100 singles of 1995
