= Smoke On Records =

German record label

- Founded: 2009
- Status: inactive
- Genre: Hip-hop
- Country of origin: Germany
- Official website: www.smokeonrecords.com

Smoke On Records is a currently defunct independent record label from Germany that mainly published hip-hop music. The label specialized mostly in re-releasing 1990s records as well as new albums. Smoke On Records has released albums for artists such as Nine, Killah Priest, Das EFX, Blahzay Blahzay, Artifacts and more.

The label has in the past been criticized for poor quality records, packaging and customer service. Their website has also not been updated since 2024, and their support doesn't respond to inquiries or new orders.

== Discography ==
=== Albums ===
Regular release
Re-release

No.	Year	Artist	Title	Format
SOR-1000-1	2009	Nine	Quinine	CD
58M-013	2013	Absztrakkt & Roey Marquis II + C.L. Audio	Dein Zeichen!	CD
58M-014	2013	Absztrakkt	Das Buch Der Drei Ringe	CD
58M-014	2013	Absztrakkt	Das Buch Der Drei Ringe	2xCD
1005-1	2013	Koopsta Knicca	Da Devils Playground	CD
SOR-1000-2	2013	Nine	Cloud 9	CD
SOR-1004-1	2013	Morlockk Dilemma	Egoshooter	CD
SOR-1000-3	2014	Nine	Nine Livez	CD
SOR-1000-5	2016	Nine	1999	LP
SOR-1007-1	2016	Killah Priest	The Psychic World of Walter Reed	3xLP
SOR-1006-1	2016	Group Home presents Brain Sick Mob	Unreleased Siccness	LP
SOR-1006-2	2017	Group Home presents Brain Sick Mob	Unreleased Siccness	CD
SOR-1008-1	2017	Group Home	Forever	CD
SOR-1008-2	2017	Group Home	Forever	LP
SOR-1009-1	2017	Murder Inc.	Let's Die Together	2xLP
SOR-1009-1	2017	Murder Inc.	Let's Die Together	CD
SOR-1009-2	2017	Murder Inc.	Let's Die Together	2xLP
SOR-1010-1	2017	Buckwild	Diggin' In The Crates - Rare Studio Masters: 1993-1997	4xLP
SOR-1011-2	2017	Das EFX	Straight From The Vault	LP
SOR-1012-1	2017	Dove Shack	Reality Has Got Me Tied Up	LP
SOR-1000-6	2017	Nine	1999	CD
SOR 1000-4	2017	Nine	Cloud 9	LP
SOR-1000-7	2017	Nine	Nine Livez	2xLP
SOR-1000-7	2017	Nine	Death Of A Demo	LP
SOR-1000-12	2017	Nine	Death Of A Demo	Cassette
N/A	2018	Nine	Death Of A Demo	CD
SOR-1011-3	2018	Krazy Drayz of Das EFX	Showtime	LP
SOR-1011-4	2018	Das EFX	Straight From The Vault	CD
SOR-1013-1	2018	Ill-Advised	Can U Smell It	LP
SOR-1014-1	2018	Innersoul	The Theory	LP
SOR-1014-1	2018	Innersoul	The Theory	CD
SOR-1017-6	2018	Artifacts	That's Them (Lost Files 1989-1992)	LP
SOR-1017-3	2018	Artifacts	That's Them (Lost Files 1989-1992)	CD
N/A	2018	Artifacts	That's Them (Lost Files 1989-1992)	Cassette
SOR-1018-1	2018	Gore Elohim	Electric Lucifer	2xLP
N/A	2018	Blahzay Blahzay	ENYthyng Iz Possible	LP
SOR-1020-2	2018	Blahzay Blahzay	ENYthyng Iz Possible	CD
AOF002	2018	Artifacts	That's Them (20th Anniversary Edition)	2xLP
N/A	2018	E.C. Illa	Seeds, Stems & Gems Lp + Bonus Lp Live From The Ill	2xLP
SOR-1026-1	2018	A.Z.	Street Wise	LP
SOR-1027-1	2018	Concrete Click	Lyrical Terrorism (The EP)	LP
SOR-1029-1	2018	Microphone Terrorist	The Ep	LP
SOR-1000-10	2018	Nine	The 9 Commandments	LP
SOR-1000-11	2018	Nine	The 9 Commandments	CD
SVG 001	2018	Knucklehedz	Stricktly Savage	LP
SVG 001	2018	Knucklehedz	Stricktly Savage	LP
