= Candy Rain =

Candy Rain may refer to:

- Candy Rain (album), an album by Soul for Real
- "Candy Rain" (song), a song by Soul for Real
- Candy Rain (film), a 2008 Taiwanese film
