= List of number-one R&B singles of 1995 (U.S.) =

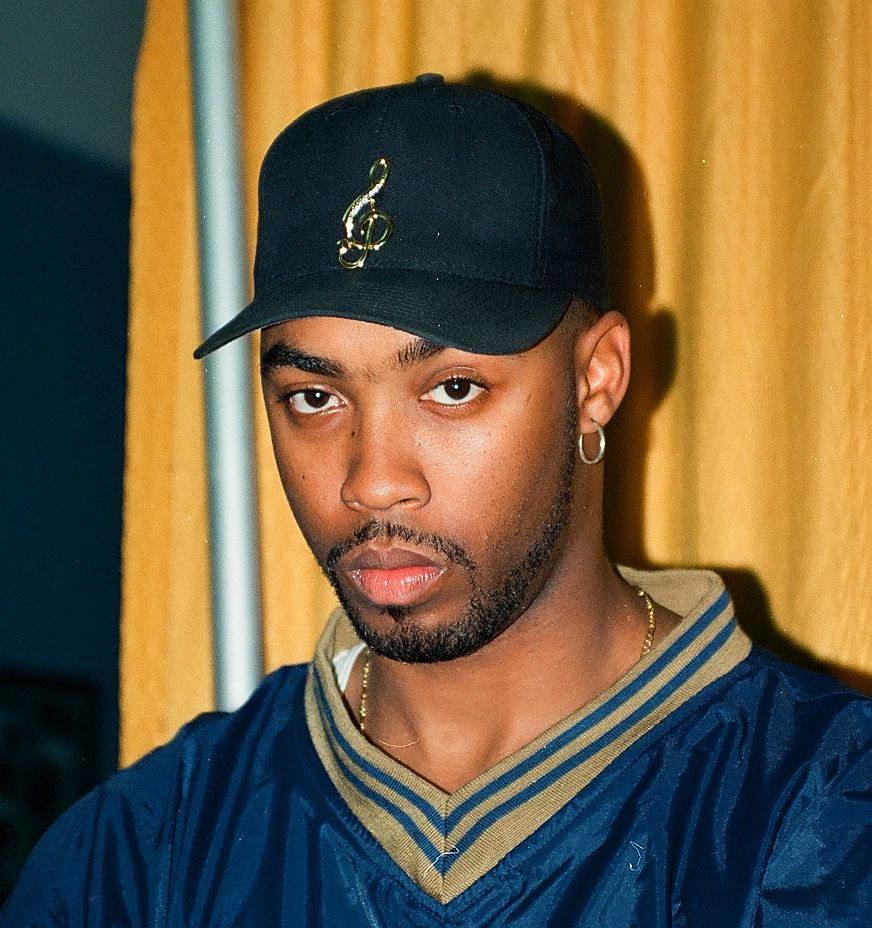
Montell Jordan had a long-running number one with "This Is How We Do It".

These are the Billboard magazine R&B singles chart number one hits of 1995:

== Chart history ==
Key
†	Indicates best-charting R&B single of 1995

Issue date	Song	Artist
January 7	"Creep" †	TLC
January 14	"Creep" †	TLC
January 21	"Creep" †	TLC
January 28	"Creep" †	TLC
February 4	"Creep" †	TLC
February 11	"Baby"	Brandy
February 18	"Baby"	Brandy
February 25	"Baby"	Brandy
March 4	"Baby"	Brandy
March 11	"Candy Rain"	Soul for Real
March 18	"Candy Rain"	Soul for Real
March 25	"Candy Rain"	Soul for Real
April 1	"This Is How We Do It"	Montell Jordan
April 8	"This Is How We Do It"	Montell Jordan
April 15	"This Is How We Do It"	Montell Jordan
April 22	"This Is How We Do It"	Montell Jordan
April 29	"This Is How We Do It"	Montell Jordan
May 6	"This Is How We Do It"	Montell Jordan
May 13	"This Is How We Do It"	Montell Jordan
May 20	"I'll Be There For You / You're All I Need to Get By"	Method Man featuring Mary J. Blige
May 27	"I'll Be There For You / You're All I Need to Get By"	Method Man featuring Mary J. Blige
June 3	"I'll Be There For You / You're All I Need to Get By"	Method Man featuring Mary J. Blige
June 10	"Don't Take It Personal (Just One of Dem Days)"	Monica
June 17	"Don't Take It Personal (Just One of Dem Days)"	Monica
June 24	"One More Chance / Stay with Me"	The Notorious B.I.G.
July 1	"One More Chance / Stay with Me"	The Notorious B.I.G.
July 8	"One More Chance / Stay with Me"	The Notorious B.I.G.
July 15	"One More Chance / Stay with Me"	The Notorious B.I.G.
July 22	"One More Chance / Stay with Me"	The Notorious B.I.G.
July 29	"One More Chance / Stay with Me"	The Notorious B.I.G.
August 5	"One More Chance / Stay with Me"	The Notorious B.I.G.
August 12	"One More Chance / Stay with Me"	The Notorious B.I.G.
August 19	"One More Chance / Stay with Me"	The Notorious B.I.G.
August 26	"Boombastic / In the Summertime"	Shaggy
September 2	"You Are Not Alone"	Michael Jackson
September 9	"You Are Not Alone"	Michael Jackson
September 16	"You Are Not Alone"	Michael Jackson
September 23	"You Are Not Alone"	Michael Jackson
September 30	"Fantasy"	Mariah Carey
October 7	"Fantasy"	Mariah Carey
October 14	"Fantasy"	Mariah Carey
October 21	"Fantasy"	Mariah Carey
October 28	"Fantasy"	Mariah Carey
November 4	"Fantasy"	Mariah Carey
November 11	"Who Can I Run To"	Xscape
November 18	"You Remind Me of Something"	R. Kelly
November 25	"Exhale (Shoop Shoop)"	Whitney Houston
December 2	"Exhale (Shoop Shoop)"	Whitney Houston
December 9	"Exhale (Shoop Shoop)"	Whitney Houston
December 16	"Exhale (Shoop Shoop)"	Whitney Houston
December 23	"Exhale (Shoop Shoop)"	Whitney Houston
December 30	"Exhale (Shoop Shoop)"	Whitney Houston

== See also ==
- 1995 in music
- Billboard Year-End Hot R&B Singles of 1995
- List of number-one R&B hits (United States)
- List of number-one R&B albums of 1995 (U.S.)
