= Dead Presidents (soundtrack) =

Soundtrack album by Various artists
- Released: September 26, 1995
- Recorded: 1967–1995
- Genres: R&B, funk, soul
- Length: 74:31
- Label: Capitol

Professional ratings
Review scores
Source	Rating
AllMusic	4.5/5 stars

Dead Presidents is the first of two soundtracks to the 1995 film, Dead Presidents. It was released on September 26, 1995, by Capitol Records and consists of 1970s R&B, funk and soul music. The soundtrack was very successful, reaching #14 on the Billboard 200 and #1 on the Top R&B/Hip-Hop Albums charts, and was certified gold on December 1, 1995. The soundtrack's success led Capitol Records to release a second volume the following year.

== Track listing ==
No.	Title	Performer(s)	Length
1.	"If You Want Me to Stay"	Sly and the Family Stone	2:58
2.	"Walk On By"	Isaac Hayes	4:34
3.	"The Payback"	James Brown	7:41
4.	"I'll Be Around"	The Spinners	3:10
5.	"Never, Never Gonna Give Ya Up"	Barry White	7:58
6.	"I Miss You"	Harold Melvin & the Blue Notes	8:28
7.	"Get Up and Get Down"	The Dramatics	3:11
8.	"(Don't Worry) If There's a Hell Below We're All Going to Go"	Curtis Mayfield	7:44
9.	"Do Right Woman, Do Right Man"	Aretha Franklin	3:15
10.	"Where Is the Love"	Jesse & Trina	4:12
11.	"Tired of Being Alone"	Al Green	2:48
12.	"Love Train"	The O'Jays	2:58
13.	"The Look of Love"	Isaac Hayes	11:13
14.	"Dead Presidents [Theme]"		4:21

Notes

- "Dead Presidents [Theme]" composed and conducted by Danny Elfman.

== Personnel and credits ==
- Executive-Producer, Album Producer – Albert Hughes, Allen Hughes, Darryl Porter
- Executive-Producer, Co-Executive Album Producer – Bonnie Greenberg
- Lacquer Cut – Wally
- Mastered – Wally Traugott

Liner album notes

== Charts ==
=== Weekly charts ===
Chart (1995)	Peak position
US Billboard 200	14
US Top R&B/Hip-Hop Albums (Billboard)	1

=== Year-end charts ===
Chart (1995)	Position
US Top R&B/Hip-Hop Albums (Billboard)	58
Chart (1996)	Position
US Top R&B/Hip-Hop Albums (Billboard)	75

== Certifications ==
Region	Certification	Certified units/sales
United States (RIAA)	Gold	500,000^{^}
^{^} Shipments figures based on certification alone.

== See also ==
- List of number-one R&B albums of 1995 (U.S.)
