= Billboard Year-End Hot Rap Singles of 1995 =

American music chart

This is a list of Billboard magazine's Top Hot Rap Singles of 1995.

No.	Title	Artist(s)
1	"One More Chance / Stay with Me"	The Notorious B.I.G.
2	"I'll Be There for You/You're All I Need to Get By"	Method Man featuring Mary J. Blige
3	"Big Poppa" / "Warning"	The Notorious B.I.G.
4	"Gangsta's Paradise"	Coolio featuring L.V.
5	"I Got 5 on It"	Luniz
6	"Dear Mama" / "Old School"	2Pac
7	"Boombastic" / "In the Summertime"	Shaggy
8	"Keep Their Heads Ringin'"	Dr. Dre
9	"Player's Anthem"	Junior M.A.F.I.A.
10	"Sugar Hill"	AZ
11	"Get Down"	Craig Mack
12	"Tootsee Roll"	69 Boyz
13	"Give It 2 You"	Da Brat
14	"Feel Me Flow"	Naughty By Nature
15	"How High"	Method Man & Redman
16	"Flava in Ya Ear"	Craig Mack
17	"1st of tha Month"	Bone Thugs-n-Harmony
18	"Mad Izm"	Channel Live featuring KRS-One
19	"I Seen a Man Die"	Scarface
20	"Freak Me, Baby"	Dis-n-Dat
21	"Bring the Pain"	Method Man
22	"Brooklyn Zoo"	Ol' Dirty Bastard
23	"Kitty Kitty"	69 Boyz
24	"Foe Life"	Mack 10
25	"Sprinkle Me"	E-40 featuring Suga-T
26	"Whutcha Want?"	Nine
27	"I Wish"	Skee-Lo
28	"Tour"	Capleton
29	"So Many Tears"	2Pac
30	"Foe tha Love of $"	Bone Thugs-n-Harmony featuring Eazy-E
31	"Cell Therapy"	Goodie Mob
32	"Thuggish Ruggish Bone"	Bone Thugs-n-Harmony
33	"Rodeo"	95 South
34	"The Most Beautifullest Thing in This World"	Keith Murray
35	"Criminology" / "Glaciers of Ice"	Raekwon
36	"Get Lifted"	Keith Murray
37	"Shook Ones, Part II"	Mobb Deep
38	"Black Coffee"	Heavy D & the Boyz
39	"Mind Blowin'"	Smooth
40	"Lifestyles of the Rich & Shameless"	Lost Boyz
41	"The I.N.C. Ride"	Masta Ace Incorporated
42	"Summertime in the LBC"	The Dove Shack
43	"1-Luv"	E-40 featuring Leviti
44	"Craziest"	Naughty by Nature
45	"Nika"	Vicious
46	"Cocktales"	Too Short
47	"I'll Be Around"	Rappin' 4-Tay featuring The Spinners
48	"MC's Act Like They Don't Know"	KRS-One
49	"Shimmy Shimmy Ya"	Ol' Dirty Bastard
50	"Oh Yeah!"	Rottin Razkals

== See also ==
- 1995 in music
- Billboard Year-End Hot 100 singles of 1995
- Billboard Year-End Hot R&B Singles of 1995
- List of Billboard number-one rap singles of 1995
