= King (Nine album) =

Studio album by Nine
- Released: September 9, 2018
- Recorded: 2017–2018
- Genre: Hardcore hip hop, East Coast hip hop, gangsta rap
- Length: 44:09
- Label: Goon MuSick
- Producer: Snowgoons

Nine chronology
Quinine (2009)	King (2018)

Singles from King
- 1. "The Revenant" Released: February 9, 2018; 2. "Pull Up" Released: July 12, 2018; 3. "Killmongor" Released: August 19, 2018; 4. "Belafonte" Released: September 7, 2018; 5. "I Am" Released: October 3, 2018

King is the fourth studio album by rapper Nine. The album was released digitally and on CD on September 9, 2018. The whole album was produced by the German production team Snowgoons. The album features appearances by New York City rappers: Conway The Machine, Kool G Rap, Smoothe Da Hustler, Ruste Juxx and Chris Rivers. It's Nine first album in 9 years, his last effort being 2009's Quinine.

== Background ==
After Nine joined the Snowgoons on their album entitled "Goon Bap" in 2016, they have been talking about new music and finally decided to move forward on a collaboration album. In February 2018, Nine and Snowgoons announcing a new studio album for summer 2018. On July 6, 2018, Nine and Snowgoons announced the release date for a new album entitled "King". Nine assures his listeners that his new album will change the game:

== Recording and production ==
The album features guest spots from Kool G Rap, Smoothe Da Hustler, Ruste Juxx, Conway The Machine and Chris Rivers. According to Nine, he chose the features on the album, whom he respects.

I choose people whose pen game I respect. Kool G Rap in particular was hero of mine, so it was a dream. Conway, Chris Rivers and Ruste Juxx, I love the way they rap and me and Smoothe Da Hustler go back to Cloud 9

The album was entirely produced by the Snowgoons. As Nine says, they started talking about this project before they even met in person.

== Singles ==
Five singles were released from this album: "The Revenant", "Pull Up", "Killmongor", "Belafonte", "I Am". Each single was accompanied by a video on it.

The first single "The Revenant" from the forthcoming album was released on February 9, 2018.

The second single "Pull Up" was released on July 12, 2018.

Nine and the Snowgoons are back in August with the video release for the third single "Killmongor".

The first three singles released from the upcoming LP, all seem to show that the OG is as sharp as ever. In an interview for the website "HipHopDX" Nine admitted that this is his best work.

Nine links with Conway The Machine for "Belafonte" single. German graphic designer and rap artist Mars of Illyricum made an animated video for the fourth single.

In his new single "I Am" Nine talks about how he is witnessing all the important events in the history of hip-hop. During the song, Nine pays tribute to many late rappers, including Onyx's executive producer Jam Master Jay, past member Big DS and the legendary producer of Onyx, Chyskillz.

== Mixtape ==
In an interview for Weekly Rap Gods, Nine announced the release of a new mixtape immediately after the release of the King album and he also added that the mixtape would be attended by rapper Cappadonna.

== Critical reception ==
Legends Will Never Die from UndergroundHipHopBlog rated the album 9/10, saying "To be honest, this may be Nine’s best work yet. There are a couple tracks that I wish were fully fleshed out but it’s mostly focused, he sounds hungrier than ever & the Snowgoons production enhances the hardcore vibe near perfectly."

== Track listing ==
#	track	featured guest(s)	producer(s)	length
01.	"The Revenant"		Snowgoons	3:12
02.	"Pull Up"		Snowgoons	3:09
03.	"Killmongor"		Snowgoons	5:05
04.	"Hilfiger"		Snowgoons	2:35
05.	"Tremendous"		Snowgoons	2:22
06.	"Belafonte"	Conway The Machine	Snowgoons	3:52
07.	"Medusa"		Snowgoons	3:57
08.	"Breathe"	Kool G Rap & Smoothe Da Hustler	Snowgoons	4:53
09.	"I Am"		Snowgoons	3:55
10.	"Pita Roll"		Snowgoons	1:52
11.	"Jump Em"	Ruste Juxx	Snowgoons	3:37
12.	"Champion"	Chris Rivers	Snowgoons	3:08
13.	"King"		Snowgoons	2:32
