= Blahzay Blahzay =

American hip hop group

Blahzay Blahzay is an East Coast hip hop group from Brooklyn, New York, composed of DJ P.F. Cuttin' and rapper Outloud. The group released two albums, 1996's Blah Blah Blah and 2018's Enythyng Iz Possible. The first album contains the group's most successful single, "Danger", which peaked at #46 on the Billboard Hot 100.

== Discography ==
=== Albums ===
- 1996: Blah Blah Blah (Fader/Mercury/PolyGram Records)
- 2018: ENYthyng iz Possible (Smoke On Records)

=== Singles ===
- "Danger" (#4 Rap, #24 R&B, #46 Pop)
- "Pain I Feel" (#23 Rap, #78 R&B)
- "Federal Reserve Notez" (1999 CD-5, Game Recordings)
- "Go Go Go" (from Ol' Dirty Bastard's posthumous 2005 mixtape Osirus)
