= Lyin' King =

Single by Nine

from the album Cloud 9
- B-side: "Industry Party"
- Released: July 23, 1996
- Recorded: 1995
- Genre: Hip hop
- Length: 3:36
- Label: Profile
- Songwriters: Derrick Keyes, Rob Lewis
- Producer: Rob Lewis

Nine singles chronology
"Any Emcee" (1995)	"Lyin' King" (1996)

"Lyin' King" is the first single released from Nine's second album, Cloud 9. It was released on July 23, 1996 and was produced by Rob Lewis. "Lyin' King" was Nine's final charting single, making it to three different Billboard charts, including 35 on the Hot Rap Singles. The song is an indirect diss aimed at rappers who were trying to capitalize on the popular Mafioso rap at the time.

== Music video ==
The official music video for the song was directed by Michael Lucero.

== Single track listing ==
=== A-Side ===
1. "Lyin' King" (Clean Version)
2. "Lyin' King" (Album Version)
3. "Lyin' King" (Catch The Beat Instrumental)

=== B-Side ===
1. "Industry Party"
2. "Industry Party" (Instrumental)
3. "Lyin' King" (Instrumental)
4. "Lyin' King" (Acapella)

== Charts ==
Chart	Position
U.S. R&B / Hip-Hop	# 82
Hot Rap Singles	# 21
Hot Dance Music/Maxi-Singles Sales	# 11
