= Quinine (album) =

Studio album by Nine
- Released: April 9, 2009
- Recorded: 2008–2009
- Genre: Hip hop
- Label: Smoke On Records
- Producer: Hiram Abiff, Hushh Productions, Mike Loc, Nance Nickles

Nine chronology
Cloud 9 (1996)	Quinine (2009)	King (2018)

Quinine is the third studio album released by rapper, Nine. It was released both digitally and on CD on April 9, 2009, (the only difference being that the CD version included a bonus track entitled "U Don't Want That") with Nine serving as an executive producer as well as writing and arranging all the tracks on the album. It is his first album in 13 years, his last effort being 1996's Cloud 9.

== Track listing ==
Nine track listing
No.	Title	Length
1.	"What's Done Is Done"	3:06
2.	"Bionic"	3:52
3.	"Furious"	3:01
4.	"Hip Hop"	4:04
5.	"Gimme My Money"	3:24
6.	"Red Light Green Light"	4:08
7.	"Shotgun"	2:39
8.	"Homicide"	4:00
9.	"Yes"	3:30
10.	"Glock 9"	3:14
11.	"Quinine"	3:29
12.	"Push"	3:08
13.	"He Got a Problem"	3:52
14.	"U Don't Want That"	3:35
Total length:		49:02
