= Azz Izz =

Studio album by MoKenStef
- Released: July 4, 1995
- Recorded: 1994–1995
- Studio: Skip Saylor Recording (Hollywood, CA); Kiva Recording (Encino, CA); Image Recording Studios (Hollywood, CA)
- Genre: R&B
- Length: 40:45
- Label: OutBurst; Def Jam
- Producer: Hami; I-Roc; Jammin' James Carter; Jiboh; Maddball Tony D; Vic C

Singles from Azz Izz
- 1. "He's Mine" Released: 1995; 2. "Sex in the Rain" Released: 1995

Azz Izz is the only studio album by American R&B group MoKenStef. It was released on July 4, 1995, through Outburst Records/Def Jam Music Group Inc. Recording sessions took place at Skip Saylor Recording and Image Recording Studio in Hollywood and Kiva Recording in Encino. Production was handled by Hami, I-Roc, Jammin' James Carter, Vic C, Jiboh and Maddball Tony D. In the United States, the album peaked at number 117 on the Billboard 200, number 24 on the Top R&B/Hip-Hop Albums and atop the Heatseekers Albums charts. Its lead single, "He's Mine", made it to number 7 on the Billboard Hot 100 and number 2 on the Hot R&B Songs in the US, number 27 in New Zealand, number 70 on the UK singles chart, and was certified gold by the Recording Industry Association of America. The second single off of the album, "Sex in the Rain", generated much less success, reaching number 63 on the US Hot R&B Songs chart. The song "Baby Come Close" was released as a promotional single.

== Critical reception ==
Professional ratings
Review scores
Source	Rating
AllMusic	2.5/5 stars

AllMusic's Stephen Thomas Erlewine commended the trio's vocal performance but felt they lacked charisma, personality and content to make them come across more than a poor imitation of TLC's CrazySexyCool, concluding that "too much of Azz Izz is comprised of mediocre material". Vibe contributor Kara Manning also felt the group failed to deliver the "vocal ingenuity" to match that album, concluding that "[W]hile Mokenstef fall short of a fresher, sassier sensuality, Azz Izz isn't a bad first outing, just an uninspired one".

== Track listing ==
No.	Title	Writer(s)	Producer(s)	Length
1.	"Sex in the Rain"	Monifa Dara Bethune; Kenya M. Hadley; Stefanie Sinclair; Marquis Dair	Big Ham	4:50
2.	"Just Be Gentle"	Bethune; Hadley; Sinclair; Dair	Big Ham	4:08
3.	"Azz Izz"	Bethune; Hadley; Sinclair; Victor Concepcion	Vic C	3:40
4.	"He's Mine"	Bethune; Hadley; Sinclair; Erica Wright; Roger Troutman; Prince Rogers Nelson	Big Ham	4:13
5.	"Don't Go There"	Bethune; Hadley; Sinclair; Chris Charles; James Calvin Carter	I-Roc; Jammin' James Carter; Eric-Cee Carter (add.)	3:14
6.	"Baby Come Close"	William Robinson; Pamela Moffett-Young; Marv Tarplin	Big Ham	3:56
7.	"Stop Callin' Me"	Miles Gregory	DJ Madball "Tony Dee"	1:04
8.	"It Happens"	Bethune; Hadley; Sinclair; Dair	Big Ham	3:52
9.	"Laid Back"	Bethune; Hadley; Sinclair; Concepcion	Vic C	3:38
10.	"Let Them Know"	Bethune; Hadley; Sinclair; Charles; Carter	I-Roc; Jammin' James Carter	3:36
11.	"It Goes On"	Bethune; Hadley; Sinclair; Malik H. Miller	Jiboh	4:34
Total length:				40:45

Sample credits

- Track 4 contains an interpolation of "Be Alright" written by Roger Troutman and an interpolation of "Do Me, Baby" written by Prince.
- Track 7 contains an interpolation of "Love Don't Live Here Anymore" written by Miles Gregory.

== Personnel ==
- Monifa Bethune – vocals
- Kenya Hadley – vocals
- Stefanie Sinclair – vocals
- Stanley "Stan the Guitar Man" Jones – guitar & bass (track 5)
- George "G-One" Archie – live drums (track 6)
- Robert "Fonksta" Bacon – guitar & bass (track 10)
- Marquis "Hami" Dair – producer (tracks: 1, 2, 4, 6, 8)
- Victor "Vic C." Concepcion – producer (tracks: 3, 9)
- Chris "I-Roc" Charles – producer (tracks: 5, 10)
- "Jammin'" James Carter – producer (tracks: 5, 10)
- DJ Maddball "Tony Dee" – producer (track 7)
- Malik "Jiboh" Miller – producer (track 11)
- Eric-Cee Carter – additional producer (track 5)
- Chris Puram – recording (tracks: 1, 3, 7, 9), mixing (tracks: 1–10)
- Howard Willing – recording (tracks: 2, 4, 7, 8)
- Ben Wallach – recording (tracks: 5, 10, 11)
- Wallace "Wally" Traugott – mastering
- Anthony "Anti" Lewis – executive producer
- Greedy Greg – executive producer
- Zulema Jacome – photography

== Charts ==
Chart (1995)	Peak position
US Billboard 200	117
US Top R&B/Hip-Hop Albums (Billboard)	24
US Heatseekers Albums (Billboard)	1
