= Dead Presidents, Vol. 2 =

Soundtrack album by Various artists
- Released: April 2, 1996
- Recorded: 1964–1973
- Genres: R&B, funk, soul
- Length: 46:11
- Label: Capitol

Professional ratings
Review scores
| Source | Rating |
|---|---|
| Allmusic | 4.5/5 stars |

Dead Presidents, Vol. 2 is the second soundtrack released for the film, Dead Presidents. It was released on April 2, 1996, through Capitol Records. After the success of the first soundtrack, Capitol Records decided to release a second soundtrack. However, this one failed to match the success of the first, only reaching #45 on the Top R&B/Hip-Hop Albums chart. Like the first, it consists of 1970s era funk and soul music.

== Track listing ==
| No. | Title | Performer(s) | Length |
|---|---|---|---|
| 1. | "I Got the Feelin'" | James Brown | 2:38 |
| 2. | "Keep on Pushing" | The Impressions | 2:32 |
| 3. | "Smiling Faces Sometimes" | The Undisputed Truth | 3:15 |
| 4. | "Right On for the Darkness" | Curtis Mayfield | 7:24 |
| 5. | "Just My Imagination (Running Away with Me)" | The Temptations | 3:51 |
| 6. | "Cowboys to Girls" | The Intruders | 2:36 |
| 7. | "Never Give You Up" | Jerry Butler | 2:56 |
| 8. | "I Was Made to Love Her" | Stevie Wonder | 2:36 |
| 9. | "Man Oh Man" | The Impressions | 3:04 |
| 10. | "When Something Is Wrong with My Baby" | Sam & Dave | 3:15 |
| 11. | "We the People Who Are Darker Than Blue" (Live) | Curtis Mayfield | 8:42 |
| 12. | "Ain't That a Groove" | James Brown | 3:32 |

== Personnel and credits ==
- Executive-Producer – Albert Hughes, Allen Hughes, Darryl Porter
- Executive-Producer [Co-Executive] – Bonnie Greenberg
- Art Direction – Jeff Fey
- Soundtrack Coordinator – Kim Niemi, Lisa Brown
- Design – Kevin Hosmann
- Management – Ira Selsky, Jill Meyers
- Mastered – Wally Traugott
- Production Assistant – Annmarie Deringer, Tonya Sanders

Liner notes

== Charts ==
=== Weekly charts ===
| Chart (1996) | Peak position |
|---|---|
| US Top R&B/Hip-Hop Albums (Billboard) | 45 |
