= Cloud 9 (Nine album) =

Studio album by Nine
- Released: August 6, 1996
- Studio: Fed Spare Bedroom; Boiler Room Recordings; The Bronx, New York; D&D Studios; Platinum Island Studios; New York City, New York
- Genre: East Coast hip hop, hardcore hip hop
- Length: 42:55
- Label: Profile
- Producer: Rob Lewis, Rockwrecka, Jesse West

Nine chronology
Nine Livez (1995)	Cloud 9 (1996)	Quinine (2009)

Singles from Cloud 9
- 1. "Lyin' King" Released: July 23, 1996

Cloud 9 is the second album by Nine, released on August 6, 1996 through Profile Records. The album spawned the lead single "Lyin' King" to promote the album. The album had mixed reviews. The album peaked at number #45 on the Billboard Top R&B/Hip Hop Albums.

== Background ==
Nine had released his debut album Nine Livez the previous year. The album reached No. 90 on the Billboard 200, while also reaching the top 20 on the R&B charts. The album also spawned the crossover single, "Whutcha Want?", which reached No. 50 on the Billboard Hot 100. After the success on "Whutcha Want?", Profile gave Nine the green light to begin work on his second album. Like his previous album, this album was mostly produced by Rob Lewis. The album featured several guest appearances, including Smoothe da Hustler and 3rd Eye, a departure from his previous album which featured virtually only two guest appearances.

The album's lead single was "Lyin' King", an indirect diss to rappers who were trying to capitalize on the popular gangsta rap and mafioso rap genres at the time. It made it to No. 81 on the R&B singles chart and 21 on the Hot Rap Singles chart. The album's second single was "Make or Take", which was a duet with label-mate Smoothe da Hustler.

== Reception ==
Professional ratings
Review scores
Source	Rating
Allmusic	3/5 stars

Brad Mills of Allmusic gave the album three out of five stars and called the album "solid from start to finish. Nine's raspy, deep catchy voice is ever present, and, with really simple beats complemented by hard basslines, it's easy to throw this back in for another round. Smoothe da Hustler makes a welcome appearance on "Make or Take," while every other track on the album bangs just as hard".

Commercially, Cloud 9 failed to sell as many copies as Nine Livez and only reached No. 45 on the Top R&B/Hip-Hop Albums, not selling enough copies to reach the Billboard 200. Due to Profile Records' financial problems, the album featured virtually no promotion, with the exception of the music videos for "Lyin' King" and "Make or Take". The lack of promotion is the main reason behind the album's poor sales.

== Track listing ==
1. "Know Introduction"- 2:38 (featuring King Just)
2. "Every Man 4 Himself"- 3:11
3. "We Play 4 Keeps"- 3:53
4. "Tha Product"- 4:19 (featuring U-Neek)
5. "Uncivilized"- 3:38 (featuring Father Shaheed)
6. "No Part a Me"- 3:42
7. "Lyin' King"- 3:36
8. "Richman, Poorman"- 2:50 (featuring 3rd Eye)
9. "Jon Doe"- 3:51
10. "Make or Take"- 4:00 (featuring Smoothe Da Hustler)
11. "Warriors"- 3:46 (featuring Bounty Killer)
12. "4 Chicken Wings and Rice"- 3:31
- In December 2012, Smoke On Records presented a limited edition of the album, which features 6 bonus tracks:
1. "Ova Confident Remix" (featuring A.R.L. Da X'RSiS)
2. "Industry Party"
3. "The Veteran"
4. "Rah Rah Nigga"
5. "When The Shit Hits The Fan"
6. "Ghetto Near You"

== Personnel ==
- Recording engineer: Rob Lewis, Joe Quinde, Ken Duro Ifill, Jesse West
- Mixing: Rob Lewis, Joe Quinde, Ken Duro Ifill, Jesse West, Father Shaheed
- Mastering: Craig Bevan
- Photography: Tim Carter
- Art direction & design: Carla Leighton

== Charts ==
Chart (1996)	Peak position
Billboard Top R&B/Hip-Hop Albums	45

== Personnel ==
- Bounty Killer - Performer
- Tim Carter - Photography
- Father Shaheed - Producer, Mixing
- Ken Ifill - Engineer
- King Just - Performer
- Chris Landry - Executive Producer
- Carla Leighton - Art Direction, Design
- Rob Lewis - Producer, Engineer
- Joe Quinde - Engineer
- Smoothe da Hustler - Performer
- U-Neek - Performer
- Jesse West - Producer, Engineer
