= Blah Blah Blah (Blahzay Blahzay album) =

Blah, Blah, Blah

Studio album by Blahzay Blahzay
- Released: August 13, 1996
- Recorded: 1994–96
- Studio: D&D Studios (New York, NY); Firehouse Studio (New York, NY)
- Genre: Hip hop
- Length: 50:14
- Label: Fader/Mercury/PolyGram
- Producer: MC Outloud (also exec.); P.F. Cuttin' (also exec.)

Blahzay Blahzay chronology
Blah, Blah, Blah (1996)	ENYthyng Iz Possible (2018)

Singles from Blah, Blah, Blah
- 1. "Danger" Released: September 19, 1995; 2. "Pain I Feel" Released: May 21, 1996

Blah, Blah, Blah is the debut studio album by American Brooklyn-based hip hop duo Blahzay Blahzay. It was released on August 13, 1996, on Fader/Mercury/PolyGram Records. The recording sessions took place at D&D Studios and at Firehouse Studio, in New York. The album was produced by the duo.

== Critical reception ==
Professional ratings
Review scores
Source	Rating
AllMusic	4.5/5 stars
The Guardian	4/5 stars
Muzik	4/5 stars
RapReviews	7/10
The Source	3/5 stars

The Guardian wrote that the duo's "samples and beats approximate a scrub in a gravel bath and their rapping, while glorying in the wordplay of the best new hip hop, retains a deadpan edge."

== Track listing ==
No.	Title	Writer(s)	Length
1.	"Intro"	Martell Ellis; Felix Rovira	2:00
2.	"Blah, Blah, Blah"	Ellis; Rovira	4:21
3.	"Medina's in da House"	Ellis; Rovira; Leon Haywood	0:13
4.	"Danger, Pt. 2" (featuring Trigger tha Gambler, Dark Man & Smoothe Da Hustler)	Ellis; Rovira; Christopher Wallace; Osten Harvey; Burt Bacharach; Hal David	4:24
5.	"Don't Let This Rap Shit Fool You"	Ellis; Rovira	5:50
6.	"Pain I Feel"	Ellis; Rovira; Hokiem Green; Vincent Morgan; Lawrence Parker; Kenyatta Blake; Walter V. Dewgarde; Ewart C. Dewgarde	4:03
7.	"Posse Jumpa" (featuring Dark Man & Mental Magician)	Ellis; Rovira	5:20
8.	"Maniac Cop"	Ellis; Rovira	1:51
9.	"Good Cop/Bad Cop"	Ellis; Rovira; Parker	5:23
10.	"Sendin' Dem Back"	Ellis; Rovira	4:17
11.	"Long Winded" (featuring Mental Magician, Verbal Fist & Verbal Hoods)	Ellis; Rovira	5:17
12.	"Jackpot"	Ellis; Rovira; Joseph Williams; Kurtis Khaleel	3:30
13.	"Danger"	Ellis; Rovira; Kendrick Davis; Chris Martin; Shelly Manne; Clarence Reid; Willie Clarke	3:45
Total length:			50:14

Sample credits

- Track 3 contains a sample from "I Wanna Do Something Freaky to You" by Leon Haywood
- Track 4 embodies portions of "The Warning" by Notorious B.I.G.
- Track 6 contains elements from "Mad Izm" by Channel Live
- Track 9 contains elements from "Sound of da Police" by KRS-One
- Track 12 contains a sample of "Latoya" by Just-Ice
- Track 13 contains excerpts from "Get It Together", elements from "Show & Prove" by Big Daddy Kane, samples from "Rockin' Chair" by Gwen McCrae, and embodies portions of "Come Clean" by Jeru the Damaja

== Personnel ==
- Martell "MC Outloud" Ellis – lyrics, vocals, producer, mixing, arranger, executive producer (tracks: 1–12)
- Felix "P.F. Cuttin'" Rovera – scratches, producer, mixing, arranger, executive producer (tracks: 1–12)
- Joe Quinde – mixing (tracks: 1, 2, 5, 6, 9, 12, 13), recording (tracks: 1, 10, 12)
- Kieran Walsh – mixing (tracks: 1, 4, 7, 10, 11)
- Suydam – assistant recording (track 2)
- Donovan McCoy – recording & engineering (track 3)
- Nolan 'Dr. No' Moffitte – recording (tracks: 4, 5, 6, 7, 8, 9, 10, 11), engineering (track 8)
- Max Vargas – assistant mixing (tracks: 4–7, 9–13)
- Bill Donely – recording (track 13)
- Chris Gehringer – mastering
- Domingo Padilla – executive producer (track 13)
- Bruce Carbone – A&R
- Calvin Laburn – A&R
- Kenyatta Bell – A&R
- Leanne Drum – A&R
- Daniel Hastings – art direction, photography
- Miguel Rivera – design

== Charts ==
Chart (1996)	Peak position
US Top R&B Albums (Billboard)	34
US Heatseekers Albums (Billboard)	24
