= Danger (Blahzay Blahzay song) =

Single by Blahzay Blahzay

from the album Blah Blah Blah
- Released: September 19, 1995
- Recorded: 1994
- Genre: Hip hop
- Length: 3:45
- Label: Fader/Mercury
- Songwriters: Outloud; P.F. Cuttin'; Shelly Manne, Jonathan Davis; Kendrick Jeru Davis; Clarence Reid
- Producer: Blahzay Blahzay

Blahzay Blahzay singles chronology
"Danger" (1995)	"Pain I Feel" (1996)

"Danger" is a song performed and produced by American East Coast hip hop group Blahzay Blahzay, issued as the lead single from their debut album, Blah Blah Blah (1996). The song contains many samples, including "Get It Together" by Beastie Boys and Q-Tip, "Rockin' Chair" by Gwen McCrae, and "Come Clean" by Jeru the Damaja. Recorded in 1994 but not released until 1995, the song became the group's only entry on the US Billboard Hot 100, peaking at No. 46 in 1995.

== Charts ==
Chart (1995–1996)	Peak position
US Billboard Hot 100	46
US Hot R&B Singles (Billboard)	24
US Hot Rap Singles (Billboard)	4
US Rhythmic Top 40 (Billboard)	30
US Cash Box Top 100	24
