= Any Emcee =

Single by Nine

from the album Nine Livez
- B-side: "Tha Cypha"
- Released: March 28, 1995
- Recorded: 1994
- Genre: Hip hop
- Length: 4:04
- Label: Profile
- Songwriters: Derrick Keyes, Rob Lewis
- Producer: Rob Lewis

Nine singles chronology
"Whutcha Want?" (1995)	"Any Emcee" (1995)	"Lyin' King" (1996)

"Any Emcee" is the second single released from Nine's debut album, Nine Livez. It was released on March 28, 1995, and was produced by Rob Lewis. "Any Emcee" appeared on three different Billboard charts. The song sampled The Spinners' "I'll Be Around and Eric B. & Rakim's "My Melody".

== Track listing ==
=== A-Side ===
1. "Any Emcee" (Radio Version)- 4:04
2. "Any Emcee" (Instrumental)- 4:03
3. "Any Emcee" (Acappella)- 3:32

=== B-Side ===
1. "Tha Cypha" (Radio Version)- 3:46
2. "Tha Cypha" (Instrumental)- 3:48
3. "Whutcha Want?" (Radio Remix)- 4:43

== Charts ==
Chart	Position
U.S. R&B / Hip-Hop	# 90
Hot Rap Singles	# 35
Hot Dance Music/Maxi-Singles Sales	# 21
