= For Life (Soul for Real album) =

Studio album by Soul for Real
- Released: September 24, 1996
- Recorded: 1995–1996
- Studio: The Hit Factory; Daddy's House Recording Studios (New York City)
- Genre: R&B; soul
- Length: 58:51
- Label: Uptown; Universal
- Producer: Heavy D; Tony Dofat; Chucky Thompson; Sean Combs; Stevie J; Tim & Bob; Chris Kringle; Rhano & Rheji Burrell; Dave Cintron

Soul for Real chronology
Candy Rain (1995)	For Life (1996)	Heat (1999)

Singles from For Life
- 1. "Never Felt This Way" Released: August 5, 1996; 2. "Love You So" Released: December 1996

Professional ratings
Review scores
Source	Rating
AllMusic	4/5 stars

For Life is the second studio album by American R&B group Soul for Real. It was released on September 24, 1996, through Uptown Records and distributed by Universal Records. The album was released quickly after their debut Candy Rain. During that time, Uptown Records founder Andre Harrell left the label to become the president at Motown Records. MCA Music Entertainment Group CEO Doug Morris promoted Heavy D as the new president of Uptown several months before the release of For Life. As a result, Uptown was moved from its parent company MCA Records to the newly launched Doug Morris label Universal Records.

The first single released was the Chucky Thompson-produced "Never Felt This Way", followed by the Sean "Puffy" Combs and Stevie J-produced second single "Love You So". Despite receiving good reviews, the album was met with the sophomore jinx. This album would be the first of a long line of R&B albums that were underpromoted while being released under Universal Records. For Life would be Soul for Real's last album recorded for a major label, as they would go independent for their next album.

== Track listing ==
No.	Title	Music	Length
1.	"Stay"	Tony Dofat, Louise Francis, Chris Dalyrimple, Brian Dalyrimple, Andre Dalyrimple, Jason Dalyrimple	4:15
2.	"Never Felt This Way"	Dwight Meyers, Nicole Johnson	4:15
3.	"You Just Don't Know"	Dwight Meyers, Tony Dofat, Erik Milteer, Felicia Adams	3:51
4.	"Love You So"	Sean Combs, Steven Jordan, Marvin Scandrick, Michael Keith, Quinnes Parker, Daron Jones	3:47
5.	"Let's Stay Together"	Al Green, Willie Mitchell, Al Jackson, Jr.	4:50
6.	"Good to You"	Nicole Johnson	3:53
7.	"Being with You"	Tim Kelley, Bob Robinson	4:53
8.	"Leavin'"	Dwight Meyers, Rhano Burrell, Rheji Burrell, Curt Gaddy, Chris Dalyrimple, Brian Dalyrimple, Andre Dalyrimple, Jason Dalyrimple	4:51
9.	"Where Do We Go"	Sean Combs, Steve Jordan, Marvin Scandrick, Michael Keith, Quinnes Parker, Daron Jones	4:36
10.	"I'm Coming Home"	Dwight Meyers, Faith Evans	5:10
11.	"Your Love Is Calling"	Rhano Burrell, Rheji Burrell, Chris Dalyrimple, Brian Dalyrimple, Andre Dalyrimple, Jason Dalyrimple	5:44
12.	"I Don't Wanna Say Goodbye"	Faith Evans, Chris Dalyrimple, Brian Dalyrimple, Andre Dalyrimple, Jason Dalyrimple, Rhano Burrell, Rheji Burrell	5:23
13.	"Can't You Tell (Acapella)"	Chris Dalyrimple, Brian Dalyrimple, Andre Dalyrimple, Jason Dalyrimple	3:28
Total length:			58:51

Samples

- "Stay" contains a sample of "Mind Power", as performed by James Brown
- "You Just Don't Know" contains a sample of "Take Some Leave Some", as performed by James Brown
- "Love You So" contains a sample of "Blues & Pants", as performed by James Brown

== Chart history ==
=== Weekly charts ===
Chart (1996)	Peak position
U.S. Billboard 200	119
US Top R&B/Hip-Hop Albums (Billboard)	29

== Personnel ==
- Keyboards and drum programming: Tony Dofat, Chucky Thompson, Stevie J., Chris Kringle, Tim Kelley, Bob Robinson, Rhano Burrell, Rheji Burrell, Dave Cintron
- Guitar: Rob Bacon, Jon Shriver
- Background vocals: Soul for Real, Erik Milteer, Monifah
- Recording engineer: Carl Nappa, Jon Shriver, Lane Craven, Tony Dofat, Andy Grassi, Ian Dalsemer, Bill Esses, Rhano Burrell, Rheji Burrell
- Mixing: Jon Shriver, Chucky Thompson, Tony Dofat, Paul Logus, Rhano Burrell, Rheji Burrell, Jamey Staub, Prince Charles Alexander, Carl Nappa
- Mastering: Chris Gehringer
- Photography: Daniela Federici
- Art direction: Nicole L. Dollison
- Design: Eric Altenburger, Elizabeth Barrett
