= I Want You Back (Pure Soul song) =

Single by Pure Soul

from the album Pure Soul
- Released: 1995
- Recorded: 1995
- Genre: R&B, New Jack Swing
- Length: 4:15
- Label: Interscope
- Songwriter(s): Karen Anderson, Sherri Blair, Teddy Riley
- Producer(s): Teddy Riley

Pure Soul singles chronology
| "We Must Be In Love" (1995) | "I Want You Back" (1995) | "Stairway to Heaven" (1996) |

Music video
- "I Want You Back" Video on YouTube

"I Want You Back" is a R&B single by Pure Soul. It was the second single from their debut album and produced by R&B/pop producer Teddy Riley. The tracks music video became a top-five most played on BET peaking at number two on the network.

== Charts ==
| Chart (1996) | Peak position |
|---|---|
| U.S. Billboard Bubbling Under Hot 100 | 101 |
| U.S. Billboard Hot R&B Singles | 26 |
| U.S. Billboard Hot Dance Single Sales | 36 |
