= N II U (album) =

Studio album by N II U
- Released: July 19, 1994
- Genre: R&B
- Label: Arista
- Producer: Clive Davis, Vincent Herbert (exec.)

Singles from N II U
- 1. "You Don't Have to Cry" Released: 1994; 2. "I Miss You" Released: 1994; 3. "There Will Never Be" Released: 1995

Professional ratings
Review scores
| Source | Rating |
|---|---|
| Allmusic | 3/5 stars |

N II U is the only studio album by American R&B group N II U, released July 19, 1994 via Arista Records. The album did not chart on the Billboard 200; however, it peaked at #90 on the Billboard R&B Albums chart and #39 on the Billboard Heatseekers chart. The album's second single, "I Miss You", was the only song from the album to chart on the Billboard Hot 100, peaking at #22.

== Track listing ==
| No. | Title | Producer(s) | Length |
|---|---|---|---|
| 1. | "Intro Interlude" | 3 Boyz from Newark | 1:13 |
| 2. | "There Will Never Be" | Rheji Burrell | 4:37 |
| 3. | "You Don't Have to Cry" | Vincent Herbert | 5:00 |
| 4. | "Someone for Me" | Rhano Burrell | 4:08 |
| 5. | "I'm Coming Home" | Vincent Herbert | 4:48 |
| 6. | "Right Now" | Vincent Herbert | 4:55 |
| 7. | "Uptempo Interlude" | 3 Boys from Newark | 1:35 |
| 8. | "Anything" | Rhano Burrell | 4:32 |
| 9. | "Let Me Come Inside" | Rheji Burrell | 4:36 |
| 10. | "Gotta Get Into Me" | Rheji Burrell | 4:29 |
| 11. | "I Miss You" | Vincent Herbert | 4:00 |

== Chart positions ==
| Chart (1995) | Peak position |
|---|---|
| US Heatseekers (Billboard) | 39 |
| US R&B Albums (Billboard) | 90 |
