= List of Billboard number-one R&B albums of 1995 =

The following is a list of Billboard magazine R&B albums that reached number one in 1995.

== Chart history ==
Issue date	Album	Artist
January 7	Miracles: The Holiday Album	Kenny G
January 14	My Life	Mary J. Blige
January 21	My Life	Mary J. Blige
January 28	My Life	Mary J. Blige
February 4	My Life	Mary J. Blige
February 11	Cocktails	Too Short
February 18	Cocktails	Too Short
February 25	My Life	Mary J. Blige
March 4	My Life	Mary J. Blige
March 11	Safe + Sound	DJ Quik
March 18	Safe + Sound	DJ Quik
March 25	My Life	Mary J. Blige
April 1	Me Against the World	2Pac
April 8	Me Against the World	2Pac
April 15	Me Against the World	2Pac
April 22	Me Against the World	2Pac
April 29	Friday	Soundtrack / Various artists
May 6	Friday	Soundtrack / Various artists
May 13	Friday	Soundtrack / Various artists
May 20	Friday	Soundtrack / Various artists
May 27	Friday	Soundtrack / Various artists
June 3	Friday	Soundtrack / Various artists
June 10	Tales from the Hood	Soundtrack / Various artists
June 17	Poverty's Paradise	Naughty by Nature
June 24	Poverty's Paradise	Naughty by Nature
July 1	Poverty's Paradise	Naughty by Nature
July 8	HIStory: Past, Present and Future, Book I	Michael Jackson
July 15	HIStory: Past, Present and Future, Book I	Michael Jackson
July 22	Operation Stackola	Luniz
July 29	Operation Stackola	Luniz
August 5	The Show, the After Party, the Hotel	Jodeci
August 12	E. 1999 Eternal	Bone Thugs-n-Harmony
August 19	E. 1999 Eternal	Bone Thugs-n-Harmony
August 26	E. 1999 Eternal	Bone Thugs-n-Harmony
September 2	The Show	Soundtrack/Various artists
September 9	The Show	Soundtrack/Various artists
September 16	The Show	Soundtrack/Various artists
September 23	The Show	Soundtrack/Various artists
September 30	The Show	Soundtrack/Various artists
October 7	The Show	Soundtrack/Various artists
October 14	4,5,6	Kool G Rap
October 21	Daydream	Mariah Carey
October 28	Doe or Die	AZ
November 4	Dead Presidents	Soundtrack/various artists
November 11	Dead Presidents	Soundtrack/various artists
November 18	Dogg Food	Tha Dogg Pound
November 25	Dogg Food	Tha Dogg Pound
December 2	R. Kelly	R. Kelly
December 9	R. Kelly	R. Kelly
December 16	Waiting to Exhale	Soundtrack / Various artists
December 23	Waiting to Exhale	Soundtrack / Various artists
December 30	Waiting to Exhale	Soundtrack / Various artists

== See also ==
- 1995 in music
- R&B number-one hits of 1995 (USA)
