= Alvaleta Guess =

American actress

- Born: November 24, 1955; Kansas City, Missouri, U.S.
- Died: September 2, 1996 (aged 40); New York City, New York, U.S.
- Occupation: Actress

Alvaleta Guess (November 24, 1955 – September 2, 1996) was an American stage/musical theatre actress, both on and off-Broadway, but also played the occasional supporting role on television and in feature films.

She appeared on Broadway in Swinging on a Star. The show was nominated for several Tony Awards and she appeared in the Tony Awards telecast. The telecast was her last public appearance as a performer. Her sole appearance on television was in an episode ("Custody") of Law & Order.

== Death ==
She died from breast cancer, aged 40, in New York City.

== Filmography ==
Year	Title	Role	Notes
1995	The Keeper	Officer Jones	
1995	Dead Presidents	Mrs. Benson	
1995	Money Train	Woman on Platform	
1996	Big Night	Lenore	
1997	White Lies	Woman #3 in Window	(final film role)
