= Stairway to Heaven (Pure Soul song) =

Single by Pure Soul

from the album Pure Soul
- B-side: "Turns Me On"
- Released: February 20, 1996
- Genre: R&B
- Label: Interscope
- Songwriter(s): Gamble, Huff, Cary Gilbert

Pure Soul singles chronology
"I Want You Back" (1995)	"Stairway to Heaven" (1996)

Music video
- "Stairway to Heaven" Video on YouTube

"Stairway to Heaven" is an R&B single by Pure Soul. It was the final single from their debut album. A radio-remix of the single was serviced to radio featuring The O'Jays, who originally recorded the song on their Family Reunion album in 1975.

== Charts ==
Chart (1996)	Peak position
U.S. Billboard Hot 100	79
U.S. Billboard Hot R&B Singles	18
