= Whutcha Want? =

Single by Nine

from the album Nine Livez
- B-side: "Redrum"
- Released: December 6, 1994
- Recorded: 1994
- Genre: Hip hop
- Length: 4:53
- Label: Profile
- Songwriters: Derrick Keyes, Rob Lewis
- Producer: Rob Lewis

Nine singles chronology
"Whutcha Want?" (1994)	"Any Emcee" (1995)

"Whutcha Want?" is the lead single released from Nine's debut album, Nine Livez. Produced by Rob Lewis, "Whutcha Want?" was Nine's most successful single, becoming his only one to make it to the Billboard Hot 100, peaking at 50 on the chart, as well as making it to 3 on the Rap charts. It was among the top rap songs of the year, reaching number 26 on the Billboard Year-End Hot Rap Singles of 1995.

"Whutcha Want?" sampled four different songs. "The Dock of the Bay" by The Staple Singers, "Spinning Wheel" by Dr. Lonnie Smith, "Catch a Groove" by Juice and "Best of My Love" by The Emotions. There are also five samples that as yet remain unidentified that appear around the 2:33 mark. The song also has been sampled itself by the Beastie Boys on their song "Putting Shame in Your Game" and "Natalie's Rap" by The Lonely Island and Natalie Portman.

Several remixes were made for the song. Rob Lewis made a street remix that appeared as a B-Side on the single, while three European bands also made remixes, each of which were released on a separate maxi-single entitled Whutcha Want: The Remixes. Portishead, Dark Globe and The Brotherhood each contributed a remix to the song. At the moment, it is the only Nine song available on iTunes, appearing on Profile Records' compilation album Profilin - the Hits.

== Single track listing ==
=== A-Side ===
1. "Whutcha Want?" (Album Version)- 4:53
2. "Whutcha Want?" (Instrumental)- 4:52
3. "Redrum"- 4:45

=== B-Side ===
1. "Me, Myself and My Microphone"- 3:52
2. "Whutcha Want?" (Street Remix)- 4:46
3. "Whutcha Want?" (Radio Remix)- 4:42

== Charts ==
=== Weekly charts ===
Chart (1995)	Peak position
Billboard Hot 100	50
Billboard Hot R&B / Hip-Hop Songs	32
Billboard Hot Rap Singles	3
Billboard Hot Dance Music/Maxi-Singles Sales	8

=== Year-end charts ===
Chart (1995)	Position
Billboard Hot Rap Singles	26
Billboard Hot Dance Music/Maxi-Singles Sales	40
Billboard Hot R&B / Hip-Hop Singles Sales	75
