= Jesse Campbell (singer) =

American singer

- Born: Maywood, Illinois, U.S.
- Genres: R&B, gospel
- Occupation: Singer
- Instrument: Vocals
- Years active: 1995–present
- Label: Capitol Records
- Website: www.jessecampbell.com

Jesse Campbell is an American R&B singer. He was a member of Team Christina in the second season of the American television talent show The Voice.

== Biography ==
Starting with gospel music, in 1994 he signed with Underworld / Capitol Records releasing an album entitled Never Let You Go, which reached No. 53 on the Billboard R&B Albums chart. The album spawned two charting singles, "When U Cry I Cry" and "Baby, Baby, Baby". He performed on national television shows such as The Tonight Show and BET's Video Soul. He performed internationally traveling to South and Central America, UK, Eastern Europe, South Africa, Asia, Russia, Belarus, China, Hong Kong, Vietnam, Italy, Denmark, Trinidad & Tobago and Mexico. He also recorded the song "Where Is the Love" for the soundtrack to the film Dead Presidents. Campbell was dropped from the label soon after, but continued singing, performing gospel music.

== The Voice (2012) ==
In 2012, he became a contestant on season two of the American television program The Voice, where he auditioned singing Leon Russell's "A Song for You". All four judges (Adam Levine, CeeLo Green, Christina Aguilera and Blake Shelton) hit the "I Want You" button for him. He chose to be part of the team of Christina Aguilera.

In the Battle round, he was put against Anthony Evans, another R&B/gospel singer. In a duet, they sang the Alicia Keys song "If I Ain't Got You". He won over Evans and advanced to the live shows. He was eliminated later in the competition, during the Live Quarter-Finals after singing "Halo" by Beyoncé

Episode	Round	Song	Result
1	Blind Auditions	"A Song for You"	Safe
6	Battle Rounds	"If I Ain't Got You"	Safe
10	Live Performances	"What a Wonderful World"	Safe
14	Quarter-finals	"Halo"	Eliminated

== Discography ==
Albums

- 1995: Never Let You Go (Capitol Records)
- 2006: Hymns From the Heart, Vol. 1 (Hiz Records)
- 2009: Sessions

Singles

Year	Title	Chart position	Album
Year	Title	US R&B	Album
1995	"When U Cry I Cry"	29	Never Let You Go
1996	"Baby, Baby, Baby"	76	Never Let You Go
