= Nine Livez =

Studio album by Nine
- Released: March 7, 1995
- Recorded: 1994
- Studio: D&D Studios (New York, NY); Rob's Crib (New York, NY); Platinum Island Studios (New York, NY)
- Genre: Hip hop
- Length: 1:00:11
- Label: Profile
- Producer: Rob Lewis; Tony Stoute

Nine chronology
Nine Livez (1995)	Cloud 9 (1996)

Singles from Nine Livez
- 1. "Whutcha Want?" Released: December 6, 1994; 2. "Any Emcee" Released: March 28, 1995; 3. "Ova Confident" Released: 1995

Nine Livez is the debut studio album by American rapper Nine. It was released on March 7, 1995, by Profile Records. The recording sessions took place at D&D Studios, Rob's Crib and Platinum Island Studios in New York in 1994. The album was produced by Rob Lewis and Tony Stoute, with Chris Landry serving as executive producer. It features a lone guest appearances from A.R.L. Da X'Rsis. The album debuted at number 90 on the Billboard 200 and number 16 on the Top R&B Albums chart in the United States.

Its lead single, "Whutcha Want?", became the rapper's most successful song, reaching No. 50 on the Billboard Hot 100 and No. 32 on the Hot R&B Singles chart. March 28, 1995 saw the release of the album's second single, "Any Emcee", which peaked at No. 15 on the Bubbling Under Hot 100 and No. 82 on the R&B Singles charts. "Ova Confident", the third and final single off of the album did not made it to the Billboard charts. All three singles had promotional music videos shot and released.

== Critical reception ==
Professional ratings
Review scores
Source	Rating
AllMusic	3/5 stars
RapReviews	8/10
The Source	4/5 stars

Nine Livez was met with generally favourable reviews from music critics. Nicholas Polunoff of The Source gave the album 4 out of 5 mics, resuming: "...overall, Nine Livez is a strong debut by an MC with an original style whose beats are 90% on point". Steve 'Flash' Juon of RapReviews gave the album 8 out of a possible 10, stating: "one of the best albums of 1995, if not the entire decade". AllMusic's M.F. DiBella gave the album a solid 3 out of a possible 5 stars calling the album "far from a classic, Nine Livez is an under-appreciated album from an underrated artist".

== Track listing ==
No.	Title	Writer(s)	Producer(s)	Length
1.	"Intro (Death of a Demo)" / "Ova Confident"	Derrick Keyes; Tony Stoute	Tony Stoute	5:12
2.	"Redrum"	Keyes; Stoute	Tony Stoute	4:42
3.	"Da Fundamentalz"	Keyes; Rob Lewis	Rob Lewis	4:07
4.	"Hit em Like Dis"	Keyes; Lewis	Rob Lewis	4:47
5.	"Who U Won Test"	Keyes; Lewis	Rob Lewis	3:31
6.	"Whutcha Want?"	Keyes; Lewis	Rob Lewis	4:34
7.	"Fo'eva Blunted"	Keyes; Lewis	Rob Lewis	3:43
8.	"Peel"	Keyes; Lewis	Rob Lewis	3:37
9.	"Retaliate" (featuring A.R.L. Da X'Rsis)	Keyes; A. Lawson; Stoute	Tony Stoute	4:15
10.	"Tha Cypha"	Keyes; Lewis	Rob Lewis	3:46
11.	"Ahh Shit"	Keyes; Lewis	Rob Lewis	3:53
12.	"Everybody Won Heaven (Redrum the Remix)"	Keyes; Stoute	Tony Stoute	5:03
13.	"Any Emcee"	Keyes; Lewis; Thom Bell; Phil Hurtt	Rob Lewis	4:02
14.	"Ta Rasss"	Keyes; Lewis	Rob Lewis	4:50
Total length:				1:00:11

2014 re-issue bonus tracks
No.	Title	Length
15.	"Me, Myself and My Microphone"
16.	"Whutcha Want? (Remix)"

Sample credits

- Track 10 contains material performed by MC Shan.
- Track 13 contains a sample of "I'll Be Around" performed by The Spinners, also contains material performed by Eric B. & Rakim.

== Personnel ==
- Derrick "Nine" Keyes – vocals
- A. "A.R.L. Da X'rsis" Lawson – vocals (track 9)
- Rob Lewis – producer, recording, mixing
- Tony Stoute – producer
- Joe Quinde – recording, mixing
- Kevin Crouse – recording
- Tony Dawsey – mastering
- Chris Landry – executive producer
- Rebecca Meek – art direction, design
- Klaus Schönwiese – photography

== Charts ==
Chart performance for Nine Livez
Chart (1995)	Peak position
US Billboard 200	90
US Top R&B Albums (Billboard)	16
