= Dead Presidents =

1995 film directed by Albert Hughes and Allen Hughes

- Theatrical release poster
- Directed by: The Hughes Brothers
- Screenplay by: Michael Henry Brown
- Story by: Albert Hughes; Allen Hughes; Michael Henry Brown
- Based on: "Specialist No. 4 Haywood T. 'The Kid' Kirkland" by Wallace Terry
- Produced by: Albert Hughes; Allen Hughes
- Starring: Larenz Tate; Keith David; Chris Tucker; N'Bushe Wright; Freddy Rodriguez; Bokeem Woodbine
- Cinematography: Lisa Rinzler
- Edited by: Dan Lebental
- Music by: Danny Elfman
- Production companies: Hollywood Pictures; Caravan Pictures; Underworld Entertainment
- Distributed by: Buena Vista Pictures Distribution
- Release date: October 4, 1995
- Running time: 119 minutes
- Country: United States
- Language: English
- Budget: $10 million
- Box office: $24.1 million (domestic)

Dead Presidents is a 1995 American neo-noir crime film co-written, produced and directed by the Hughes Brothers. The film stars Larenz Tate as Anthony Curtis, a young man from The Bronx who enlists in the United States Marine Corps, serves in the Vietnam War as a Recon Marine, and returns home in 1973. Struggling with post-traumatic stress disorder, unemployment, and financial hardship, Anthony joins several friends in an armored car robbery. The film depicts the difficulties faced by Black and Latino veterans returning from the Vietnam War and their treatment after their military service.

Principal photography began in October 1994 and took place in New York, Los Angeles, and Florida, where the Vietnam scenes were filmed. Dead Presidents received mixed reviews from critics. It grossed $24.1 million domestically.

== Plot ==
In 1968, Anthony Curtis, a soon-to-be high school graduate in The Bronx, chooses to enlist in the United States Marine Corps rather than go to college. He deploys to Vietnam, leaving behind his middle-class family, his girlfriend Juanita, and small-time crook Kirby, who is like a second father. Anthony's close friend, Skip, later joins Curtis' Recon squad after dropping out of Hunter College. His other friend, Jose, is drafted into the United States Army. Once in Vietnam, Curtis and his squad lose several fellow Marines during combat, and commit several atrocities of their own, such as executing enemy prisoners and beheading Viet Cong corpses for war trophies.

When Anthony returns to the Bronx in 1973, he finds returning to "normal" life impossible. Skip is now an Agent Orange victim and heroin addict; Jose, forced to wear a prosthetic hand, is a pyromaniac who works as a postman at the James A. Farley Building, and Cleon, the squad's religious but homicidal staff sergeant, is now a devoted minister in Mount Vernon.

After being laid off from his job at a butcher's shop, on the verge of alcoholism, and suffering from heavily induced PTSD nightmares, Anthony finds himself unable to support Juanita (who is having an affair with a pimp) or his infant daughter. After an argument with Juanita, Anthony meets her sister, Delilah, who is now a member of the "Nat Turner Cadre", a militant Black power Marxist group. Anthony, Kirby, Skip, Jose, Delilah and Cleon devise a plan to rob an armored car making a stop at the Noble Street Federal Reserve Bank.

The next day, the group strategically position themselves around the street, armed with weapons and disguised with face paint, ready to ambush the truck. The plan goes awry when Cleon is approached by a New York Police Department (NYPD) officer who unknowingly stumbles upon the robbery, leading to Kirby being shot in the arm and Skip killing the officer. At the same time, Anthony and Jose are spotted by the truck's driver, causing a shootout with the security guards.

Jose plants an explosive device on the escaping truck to blow off the door, but instead it destroys the entire vehicle. Delilah saves Anthony's life by killing one of the guards. A second guard appears and shoots Delilah multiple times, killing her. As the group collects what cash they can from the burning wreckage, they flee and split up to escape the police. Jose gets cornered in an alley by an approaching police car. When he shoots the officer, he is hit by the car and killed as the car crashes into a wall.

Not long after the heist, Kirby hears that Cleon has been giving out $100 bills and purchased a new Cadillac. Anthony drives over to Cleon's church to speak to him, only to find him being led out of the front door in handcuffs by two detectives. Cleon gives up the other robbers as part of a plea bargain. NYPD officers storm Skip's apartment to arrest him, but find him dead from a heroin overdose. As Kirby and Anthony prepare to flee to Mexico, police raid the bar. Kirby tries to fight the officers to allow Anthony to flee, but it is to no avail, as multiple officers corner and arrest Anthony.

In court, Anthony's lawyer pleads for a fair sentence, noting that he served his country in the Marines and earned a Silver Star. Anthony also pleas for leniency, expressing remorse for the deaths of those involved, and that he did what he did out of desperation and hardship. However the judge, a Marine and Battle of Guadalcanal veteran, proclaims that Anthony has forgotten his values and shouldn't use the Vietnam War as an excuse for his actions, sentencing him to fifteen years to life. Anthony, furious at his sentence, throws a chair at the judge. He protests in vain about everything he's done for his country, before being escorted away by bailiffs. The final scene shows Anthony looking out of the window of his prison bus.

== Cast ==
- Larenz Tate as Anthony Curtis
- Keith David as Kirby
- Chris Tucker as Skip
- N'Bushe Wright as Delilah Benson
- Freddy Rodríguez as Jose "Joe"
- Rose Jackson as Juanita Benson
- Bokeem Woodbine as Cleon
- Michael Imperioli as D'Ambrosio
- David Barry Gray as Devaughn
- Jaimz Woolvett as Lieutenant Dugan
- Jenifer Lewis as Mrs. Curtis
- James Pickens Jr. as Mr. Curtis
- Clifton Powell as "Cutty"
- Clifton Gonzalez Gonzalez as Betancourt
- Terrence Howard as "Cowboy"
- Jean-Claude La Marre as Ramsuer
- Sticky Fingaz as Martin
- Alvaleta Guess as Mrs. Benson
- Elizabeth Rodriguez as Marisol
- Tony Sirico as Officer Spinelli
- Robert LuPone as Attorney Salvatore Rizzo
- Martin Sheen as The Judge (uncredited)

== Themes ==
The film depicts the struggle of returning war veterans of color who are neglected by the US government and the mistreatment of Vietnam veterans. Many black and Latino veterans of the Vietnam War were denied benefits, compensation, and recognition for their efforts in serving their country.

== Production ==
Principal photography commenced on October 31, 1994. The production filmed through the remainder of the year and into early February across a variety of locations, including location shoots Brooklyn and Mount Vernon, New York. Sound stages in Queens and Los Angeles served as interior locations. All Vietnam scenes were shot in Florida, with former celery farm Lee Ranch serving as the outdoor sets.

According to Tate, Jada Pickett Smith was considered to portray Delilah Benson. However, she turned the role down out of respect for her close friend Tupac Shakur, due to his feud with the Hughes Brothers.

== Reception ==
=== Box Office ===
During its opening weekend, Dead Presidents grossed $7,943,778 million domestically, earning more than the opening debut of the Hughes Brothers' previous film, Menace II Society. It has grossed a total of $24.1 million domestically.

=== Critical Response ===
Dead Presidents received mixed reviews from critics. Film review aggregator Rotten Tomatoes reports that 49% of critics gave the film a positive rating, based on 35 reviews with an average score of 5.8/10.

Todd McCarthy of Variety gave the film a positive review stating, "In all respects an extremely ambitious follow-up to their crackling debut, Menace II Society, the Hughes Brothers' mordant Dead Presidents may eventually box itself into a narrative dead end, but its muscular engagement of weighty themes and explosive situations makes it a powerful drama." Kenneth Turan of the Los Angeles Times called the film "both expected and surprising, familiar and yet somehow different. Made with fluid skill and a passion for storytelling, its tale of how the Vietnam War and American society affect a black Marine remains accessible while confounding expectations."

Caryn James of The New York Times felt the film "takes on much more than it can handle." Comparing the film with the Hughes Brother's previous film James said, "The Hugheses obviously knew the world and generation of Menace II Society better than the past of Dead Presidents, but that is only part of the problem. In Menace they trusted the audience more, immersing them in a violent world the film explained without condoning."

Roger Ebert of the Chicago Sun-Times gave the film a mixed 2.5 star review, and explained that the directing duo "have a sure sense of the camera, of actors, of the life within a scene. But they are not as sure when it comes to story and meaning, and here is a film that feels incomplete, as if its last step is into thin air. Scene by scene you feel its skill, but you leave the theater wondering about the meaning of it all." The early scenes were the best, according to Ebert, and the film "goes off the rails" in the final act.

Mark Kermode placed it at number two in his countdown of top five underrated films of all time.

== Soundtracks ==
Year	Album	Peak chart positions		Certifications
Year	Album	U.S.	U.S. R&B	Certifications
1995	Dead Presidents: Released: September 26, 1995; Label: Capitol	14	1	US: Gold
1996	Dead Presidents, Vol. 2: Released: April 2, 1996; Label: Capitol	–	45	

== See also ==
- List of hood films
