= When U Cry I Cry =

Single by Jesse

from the album Never Let You Go
- Released: 1995
- Genre: R&B
- Length: 4:50
- Label: Capitol
- Songwriters: Willie Beck, Richard Brown, Steve Grissette

Jesse Campbell singles chronology
"When U Cry I Cry" (1995)	"Baby, Baby, Baby" (1996)

"When U Cry I Cry" is a song performed by Jesse Campbell (then known as Jesse), issued as the lead single from his debut album Never Let You Go. The song peaked at #29 on the Billboard R&B chart in 1995.

== Charts ==
=== Weekly charts ===
Chart (1995)	Peak position
US Bubbling Under Hot 100 (Billboard)	24
US Hot R&B/Hip-Hop Songs (Billboard)	29

=== Year-end charts ===
Chart (1995)	Position
US Hot R&B/Hip-Hop Songs (Billboard)	91
