= Candy Rain (album) =

Studio album by Soul for Real
- Released: March 28, 1995
- Recorded: 1994–1995
- Length: 44:47
- Label: Uptown; MCA
- Producer: Andre Harrell (exec.); Heavy D (exec.); Trackmasters; Kenny Greene; Dave Cintron

Soul for Real chronology
Candy Rain (1995)	For Life (1996)

Singles from Candy Rain
- 1. "Candy Rain" Released: November 15, 1994; 2. "Every Little Thing I Do" Released: April 25, 1995; 3. "If You Want It" Released: October 17, 1995

Candy Rain is the debut studio album by American R&B group Soul for Real. It was released on March 28, 1995, through Uptown Records and distributed by MCA Records.

The album peaked at No. 23 on the Billboard 200 chart. By August 1995, it was certified platinum in sales by the RIAA after sales exceeding one million copies in the United States.

== Release and reception ==
Candy Rain peaked at No. 23 on the Billboard 200 and No. 5 on the R&B Albums chart. The album was certified platinum by August 1995.

While Stephen Thomas Erlewine of AllMusic did call the group "undoubtedly fine singers," he did not feel they were strong enough to make some of the weaker material on the album very convincing.

== Track listing ==
No.	Title	Lyrics	Music	Producer(s)	Length
1.	"Candy Rain"	Heavy D; Terri Robinson	Jean C. Olivier; Samuel Barnes; Heavy D	Heavy D; Poke; Red Hot Lover Tone	4:34
2.	"Every Little Thing I Do"	Heavy D; Robinson	Olivier; Barnes; Heavy D	Heavy D; Poke & Red Hot Lover Tone	4:17
3.	"All in My Mind"	Heavy D	Alexander Richbourg; Olivier	Alexander Richbourg; Poke; Heavy D (co.)	3:56
4.	"If You Want It"	Heavy D; Robinson	Heavy D; Olivier; Barnes; Dave Cintron	Heavy D; Poke (co.); Red Hot Lover Tone (co.); Dave Cintron (co.)	3:34
5.	"I Wanna Be Your Friend"	Heavy D; Robinson	Heavy D; Olivier; Barnes	Heavy D; Poke (co.); Red Hot Lover Tone (co.)	4:00
6.	"Ain't No Sunshine"	Bill Withers	Withers	Heavy D	1:15
7.	"Spend the Night"	Heavy D; Robinson (co.); Andre Dalyrimple (co.)	Heavy D; Olivier; Barnes	Heavy D; Poke (co.); Red Hot Lover Tone (co.)	3:53
8.	"I Don't Know"	Heavy D; Robinson	Heavy D; Olivier	Heavy D; Poke (co.)	8:03
9.	"If Only You Knew"	Cynthia Biggs; Dexter Wansel; Kennenth Gamble; Heavy D (add.)	Heavy D; Olivier	Heavy D; Poke (co.)	5:50
10.	"Thinking of You"	Kenny Greene	Greene; Cintron	Kenny Greene; Cintron; Heavy D (co.)	4:48
11.	"Piano Interlude"			Heavy D	0:37

== Chart history ==
=== Weekly charts ===
Chart (1995)	Peak position
US Billboard 200	23
US Top R&B/Hip-Hop Albums (Billboard)	5

=== Year-end charts ===
Chart (1995)	Position
US Billboard 200	90
US Top R&B/Hip-Hop Albums (Billboard)	38

=== Singles ===
Year	Single	Peak chart positions				
Year	Single	U.S. Billboard Hot 100	U.S. Hot Dance Music/Maxi-Singles Sales	U.S. Hot R&B/Hip-Hop Singles & Tracks	U.S. Rhythmic Top 40	U.S. Top 40 Mainstream
1994	"Candy Rain"	2	2	1	1	20
1995	"Every Little Thing I Do"	17	—	11	4	25
1995	"If You Want It"	—	43	53	—	—

"—" denotes releases that did not chart.

== Personnel ==
Information taken from AllMusic.

- arranging – Heavy D, Terri Robinson
- art direction – Brett Wright
- assistant engineering – Ben Arindell, Chris Curran, Steve Sisco, Matt Tuffli
- assistant mixing – Steve Sisco, Matt Tuffli
- bass – Terri Robinson
- composing – Pete Belasco
- drum programming – Poke
- engineering – Bill Esses, Mikael Ifuersen, Richard Travali
- executive production – Andre Harrell, Heavy D
- guitar – James E. Rohlehr
- keyboards – Dave Cintron, Alexander Richbourg
- loops – Poke
- make-up – Melanie Harris
- mastering – Michael Sarsfield
- mixing – Bill Esses, Tony Maserati, Richard Travali
- photography – Mark Contratto
- production – Heavy D, Poke, Red Hot Lover Tone
- production coordination – Debra Young
- saxophone – Sylvester Scott
- vocal arrangement – Kenny Greene
- vocals – Andre Dalyrimple, Brian Dalyrimple, Christopher Dalyrimple, Jason Dalyrimple, Terri Robinson
- vocals (background) – Desiree Dalyrimple, Nicole Dalyrimple, Kenny Greene, Red Hot Lover Tone, Terri Robinson
- vocoder – Dave Cintron, Darin Whittington
