= We Must Be in Love =

"We Must Be In Love"

Single by Pure Soul

from the album Pure Soul
- Released: 1995
- Genre: R&B
- Label: Interscope
- Songwriter: Kim Jordan

Pure Soul singles chronology
"We Must Be In Love" (1995)	"I Want You Back" (1995)

Music video
- "We Must Be In Love" Video on YouTube

"We Must Be In Love" is the title of a R&B single by Pure Soul. It was the first single from the band's debut album. The single peaked at number eleven at R&B radio in 1995.

== Charts ==
Chart (1995)	Peak position
U.S. Billboard Hot 100	65
U.S. Billboard Hot R&B Singles	11
U.S. Billboard Hot Dance Single Sales	22
