= Pure Soul (group) =

American contemporary R&B group

- Origin: Washington, D.C.
- Genres: R&B
- Years active: 1994–1997
- Labels: Interscope Records
- Past members: Shawn Allen; Keitha Shepard; Kirstin Hall; Lydia Awad; Heather Perkins

Pure Soul was an American R&B girl group who were signed to Interscope Records in the mid 1990s. They are perhaps best known for their single "We Must Be in Love", the debut single from their self-titled debut album. The Pure Soul album (the group's only album) scored three top forty hits on the US Billboard R&B chart. Their music videos were some of the most frequently played videos on BET, VH-1 and The Box at the time of their release. After the singles ran their course and faded from regular rotation, the group mysteriously disappeared from the music scene without any explanation.

== Discography ==
Albums

- Pure Soul (1995)

Singles

Year	Single	Peak positions		
Year	Single	Billboard Hot 100	Hot R&B/Hip-Hop Singles & Tracks	Hot Dance Music/Maxi-Singles Sales
1995	"We Must Be In Love"	65	11	22
1995	"I Want You Back"	101	26	36
1995	"Freedom"	45	18	—
1996	"Stairway to Heaven"	79	18	—
"—" denotes a release that did not chart.
