= I Miss You (N II U song) =

1994 single by N II U

Single by N II U

from the album N II U
- B-side: "Right Now"
- Released: October 31, 1994
- Recorded: 1994
- Genre: R&B
- Length: 4:00
- Label: Arista
- Songwriters: Vincent Herbert, Chuckie Howard
- Producer: Vincent Herbert

N II U singles chronology
"You Don't Have to Cry" (1994)	"I Miss You" (1994)	"There Will Never Be" (1995)

Music video
- "I Miss You" on YouTube

"I Miss You" is a song by American R&B group N II U. It is the closing track on the group's eponymous debut album (1994) and was released in October 1994 by Arista Records, as the album's second single. It is written by Vincent Herbert and Chuckie Howard, and produced by Herbert. The song became the group's only hit on the US Billboard Hot 100, peaking at number 22. It also peaked at number 19 on the US Cash Box Top 100 in the same period. The accompanying music video was directed by American director Lionel C. Martin.

== Charts ==
=== Weekly charts ===
Chart (1994)	Peak position
US Billboard Hot 100	22
US Hot R&B Singles (Billboard)	14
US Rhythmic Top 40 (Billboard)	9
US Cash Box Top 100	19

=== Year-end charts ===
Chart (1995)	Position
US Billboard Hot 100	96
US Hot R&B Singles (Billboard)	71
