= N II U =

American contemporary R&B group

N II U (pronounced "Into You") is an R&B group from New Jersey consisting of Chuckie Howard, Chris Herbert, Don Carlis and Craig Hill. The group's only pop hit was the single "I Miss You", which peaked at #22 on the Billboard Hot 100 in 1994.

== Discography ==
=== Albums ===
- N II U (1994)

=== Singles ===
Year	Song	U.S. Hot 100	U.S. R&B	U.S. Rhythmic	Album
1994	"You Don't Have to Cry"	-	56	-	N II U
1994	"I Miss You"	22	14	9	N II U
1995	"There Will Never Be"	-	90	-	N II U

== Notes ==
- Whitburn, Joel (2002). Top Pop Singles, 1955-2002. Menomonee Falls, Wisconsin: Record Research. ISBN 0-89820-155-1.
