= Every Little Thing I Do =

Single by Soul for Real

from the album Candy Rain
- Released: April 25, 1995
- Genre: R&B
- Length: 4:20
- Label: Uptown
- Songwriters: Dwight Myers; Samuel Barnes; Jean-Claude Olivier; Terri Robinson; Raymond Calhoun
- Producers: Heavy D & Poke & Tone

Soul 4 Real singles chronology
"Candy Rain" (1994)	"Every Little Thing I Do" (1995)	"If You Want It" (1995)

"Every Little Thing I Do" is the second single from American R&B group Soul for Real's first album, Candy Rain (1995). Eldest brother Chris (aka Choc) sings lead. While it was not as big a hit as "Candy Rain", it reached number 11 on the US Billboard R&B chart and number 17 on the Billboard Hot 100. The song samples "Outstanding" by the Gap Band. The single was certified Gold by the RIAA for selling over 500,000 copies in the United States on October 25, 1995. In 2018, Jase, the lead singer of Soul for Real, featured his brother Choc on a remake of the song on his solo recording project called "If You Feel Like Me: The Mixtape". The song is written and recorded in the key of G minor.

== Music video ==
Directed by Brett Ratner, the music video for "Every Little Thing I Do" takes place in a club complete with a bar, roller rink and a rotating platform upon which the group is performing. R&B girl group Total, labelmates the Lost Boyz, and label boss Heavy D make cameo appearances in the video.

== Charts ==
=== Weekly charts ===
Chart (1995–1996)	Peak position
Australia (ARIA)	63
New Zealand (Recorded Music NZ)	28
UK Singles (OCC)	31
UK Club Chart (Music Week)	15
US Billboard Hot 100	17
US Hot R&B/Hip-Hop Songs (Billboard)	11
US Rhythmic (Billboard)	4
US Cash Box Top 100	9

=== Year-end charts ===
Chart (1995)	Position
US Billboard Hot 100	45
US Hot R&B/Hip-Hop Songs (Billboard)	46
US Cash Box Top 100	37
