= Nine (rapper) =

American rapper (born 1969)

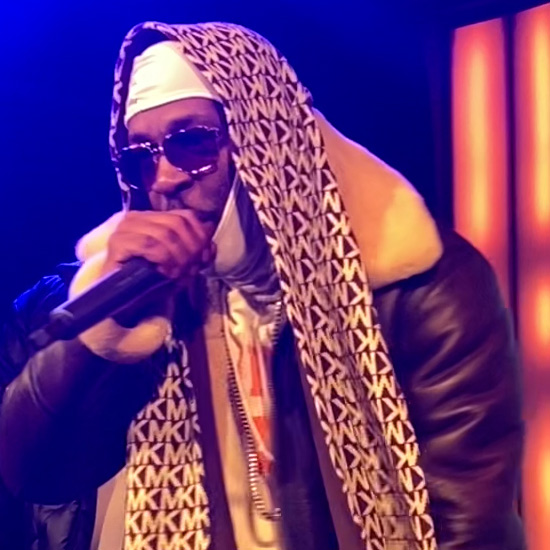

Background information
- Also known as: Ricochet; 9 Double M; 9MM
- Born: Derrick Keyes
- Origin: New York City, U.S.
- Genres: Hardcore hip hop; East Coast hip hop
- Occupations: Rapper; songwriter; actor
- Years active: 1985–present
- Labels: Profile/Arista/BMG; Goon MuSick

Derrick Keyes, known professionally as Nine, is an American rapper from the Bronx, New York. He emerged in the early 1990s as part of the East Coast hip-hop scene and achieved wider recognition following the release of his debut album, Nine Livez (1995).

== Career ==
Early career and breakthrough (1988–1996)

Nine began his recording career as a member of the Bronx-based hip-hop group Deuces Wild, performing under the name Ricochet. The group first gained traction after recording an on-air promo for DJ Chuck Chillout's popular 98.7 Kiss FM mixshow, then went on to release the single “Five Times the Rhymer / Deuces Is Def” on Sutra Records in 1988.

In 1993, he gained wider attention recording under the name 9MM (also credited as Nine Double M) appearing on the Funkmaster Flex single “Six Million Ways to Die,” released on Nervous Records. His performance on the song was noted for its raspy vocal tone and aggressive delivery, defining elements associated with his early recordings.

With the release of his debut album Nine Livez in 1995 on Profile Records, he shortened his stage name to Nine. He later explained in interviews, "I didn't want to be just named after the gun (9mm)." The album featured production by Rob Lewis and Tony Stoute and received contemporary critical attention, including a four-mic rating from The Source. Its lead single, “Whutcha Want?”, charted on multiple Billboard listings, peaking at No. 50 on the Billboard Hot 100 and No. 3 on Hot Rap Singles, with an accompanying video that received regular rotation on music-video television outlets during its release period. In addition to its chart performance, “Whutcha Want?” is also listed among the soundtrack credits for the 1995 independent film Kids, further extending the album's cultural exposure beyond radio and music video rotation. A follow-up single, “Any Emcee,” further reinforced Nine's reputation as a battle-oriented lyricist within the East Coast underground.

Profile released Nine's second album, Cloud 9, in August 1996. The album charted on the Billboard R&B/Hip-Hop Albums list and was supported by a music video for its lead single “Lyin’ King,” directed by Michael Lucero, as well as a video for “Make or Take.” By the end of the decade, Profile Records was sold to Arista Records, which resulted in Nine no longer being signed to an active label.

2000s

During the early 2000s, Nine self-released the single “It’s Ugly,” followed by intermittent recording and performing activity. In 2007, Quinine: The Overseas Shipment was released through an independent European label, reflecting continued international interest in his work. He remained active in the underground, randomly releasing mixtapes and guest appearances.

2010s-Present

In 2016, Nine appeared on Goon Bap, an album by German hip-hop production collective Snowgoons. Soon after, Nine joined them again as the primary vocalist for the collaborative album King, a producer-driven project released on Goon MuSick, with additional guest appearances from Conway the Machine, Kool G Rap, Smoothe da Hustler, Ruste Juxx and Chris Rivers.

In recent years, Nine has continued to record and make guest appearances, sharing new material through non-traditional digital platforms.

Reception and legacy

Although the 1990s East Coast hip-hop era featured a wide range of gritty vocal styles, Nine's earlier work has continued to be cited by critics and listeners as influential within hardcore and underground East Coast hip-hop. His debut album Nine Livez received strong contemporary attention, including a favorable four-mic review in The Source, which highlighted his vocal presence and uncompromising lyrical approach. The album's lead single, “Whutcha Want,” was also included on The Source magazine's “Best of” mixtape for the year.

Retrospective commentary has emphasized the durability of Nine's early recordings, particularly as interest in 1990s boom-bap and traditional East Coast hip-hop has increased. Writers and commentators have frequently referenced his work when discussing under-recognized figures of the era, noting that his catalog maintained credibility among listeners despite limited sustained mainstream promotion.

While Nine did not maintain consistent chart visibility after the late 1990s, his recordings remained in circulation through underground radio, mixtapes, and later digital platforms. His style and delivery have been cited as representative of a period in East Coast hip-hop that emphasized raw vocal performance and lyrical intensity over commercial polish.

Television, Stage, and Commercial work

Alongside his recording career, Nine has appeared in a range of television, stage and commercial projects. In 1997, he made a guest appearance on the Fox Network crime drama New York Undercover, appearing in Season 3, episode “Kill the Noise,” which centered on tensions within the hip-hop community during that time period.

In 2000, Nine appeared in Echo Park, a hip-hop musical staged at the Apollo Theater in Harlem. The production was covered by Time magazine in its discussion of the growing intersection between hip-hop culture and musical theater, with Nine portraying the lead character, a young DJ coming of age during hip-hop's early years.

Elements of Nine's song "Whutcha Want?" later appeared in a national advertisement by American automobile manufacturer Jeep, extending the track's visibility beyond its original release period. Nine also worked on national advertising campaigns for brands including Burger King and Lugz, in addition to his work in music.

== Discography ==
=== Albums ===
List of albums, with selected chart positions and certifications
Title	Album details	Peak chart positions	
Title	Album details	US	US R&B
Nine Livez	Released: March 7, 1995; Label: Profile; Format: CD, cassette, digital download, LP	90	18
Cloud 9	Released: August 6, 1996; Label: Profile; Format: CD, cassette, digital download, LP	—	45
Quinine	Released: April 9, 2009; Label: Smoke On; Format: CD, digital download	—	—
King	Released: September 9, 2018; Label: Goon MuSick; Format: CD, LP, digital download	—	—

=== Singles ===
Year	Single	Chart positions			Album
Year	Single	U.S. Hot 100	U.S. R&B	U.S. Rap	Album
1995	"Whutcha Want?"	50	32	3	Nine Livez
1995	"Any Emcee"	–	90	35	Nine Livez
1996	"Lyin' King"	–	82	21	Cloud 9
