= MoKenStef =

American R&B group

- MoKenStef, 1995

Background information
- Origin: Los Angeles, California, U.S.
- Genres: R&B
- Years active: 1994–2000, 2014–present
- Label: Def Jam Records
- Past members: Monifa Bethune; Kenya Hadley; Stefanie Sinclair

MoKenStef is an American female R&B trio from Los Angeles, active from 1994 until 2000. The group name was a combination of the first syllable of each member's name: Monifa, Kenya, and Stefanie. They released an album, Azz Izz, in 1995, and their biggest hit was "He's Mine", which peaked at #7 on the Billboard Hot 100. It also spent one week in the UK Singles Chart in September 1995 at #70. Their second single, "Sex in the Rain", was not as successful, peaking only at #41 on the US R&B chart.

== History ==
1990–1995: Early years and initial success

MoKenStef began in 1990 with members Kenya Hadley (born September 21, 1972), and Stefanie Sinclair (born September 27, 1972) becoming friends while both being cheerleaders at Inglewood's Morningside High School. They were also dancers and were looking for a third member for their hip-hop dance crew. Hollywood High School student Monifa Bethune (born September 28, 1972), auditioned and ultimately won the audition. The trio then started dancing for various hip hop acts on stage and in videos, most notably for rapper AMG ("B**** Betta Have My Money"), and Big Daddy Kane's "This Is for the Lover in You". Looking to go beyond background dancers, they started developing their respective vocal talents. They connected with a local production company, which didn't go far, and according to the members, they "signed a contract with a shady management company, which went absolutely nowhere." While working on their music career, the trio took college classes and had normal 9–5 jobs.

Their break came when they saw rapper AMG one afternoon at the office of "Greedy Greg" Jesse and Anthony "Anti" Lewis, owners of Outburst Records. The owners were listening in on AMG and some local artists tossing out rhymes. Monifa chimed in with a melody and suddenly the trio had a captive audience with their rhyming and singing. Soon after, in 1994, MoKenStef was officially formed. They signed with Outburst Records, which was formed under the label Def Jam. By then, they had begun to work on their album. Their last single was intended to be "Baby Come Close", a remake of Smokey Robinson's song, for which MoKenStef recorded a remix called "I Can't Help It" (this one was a cover of Michael Jackson's song). Both album and remix versions were released promotionally on CD and vinyl. The group also made a video for it directed by Cameron Casey, but in the end the intended single was never released commercially.

In 1995, the group performed "He's Mine" on the television shows Soul Train, All That and Video Soul.

=== 1996–2000: Other projects and break-up ===
MoKenStef appeared on the soundtrack of the film Phat Beach in 1996, with the song "Jock'n Me". In 1999, the group released a single called "He Say She Say", which was a promotion for the album Hits 4 the New Millennium by Cool Dre, but their attempt was unsuccessful. In 2000, they officially disbanded.

2014–present: Reunion

After a 14 year hiatus, MoKenStef reunited in 2014 and their Instagram page can be found as Therealmokenstef.

== Discography ==
=== Album ===
- Azz Izz (1995)

=== Singles ===
- "He's Mine" (1995)
- "Sex in the Rain" (1995)
- "Baby Come Close" (1995) (promotional only)
- "He Say She Say" (1999) (promotional only)
