= He's Mine (MoKenStef song) =

Single by Mokenstef

from the album Azz Izz
- Released: May 30, 1995
- Recorded: 1994
- Genre: R&B
- Length: 4:13 (album version); 3:59 (remix)
- Label: Def Jam
- Songwriters: Monifa Bethune; Kenya Hadley; Stephanie Sinclair; Hami; Roger Troutman; Prince; Larry Troutman

Mokenstef singles chronology
"He's Mine" (1995)	"Sex in the Rain" (1995)

"He's Mine" is a song by American R&B girl group MoKenStef released as the first single from their debut album, Azz Izz (1995). It was the group's biggest hit, peaking at No. 7 on the US Billboard Hot 100 chart during the summer of 1995. It sold 600,000 copies and was certified gold by the RIAA. The song samples "Be Alright" by Zapp and "Do Me, Baby" by Prince. A remix by Grand Puba features samples of Patrice Rushen's "Remind Me" and Doug E. Fresh and Slick Rick's "La Di Da Di".

== Music videos ==
Two different music videos for the song were released. The original version was filmed and released in May 1995. The second version for the remix was filmed in September 1995 and released in November 1995.

== Track listing ==
- US CD single
1. "He's Mine" (LP version) – 4:13
2. "He's Mine" (instrumental LP version) – 4:13
- US CD maxi single
1. "He's Mine" (album version) – 4:13)
2. "He's Mine" (instrumental LP version) – 4:13)
3. "I Got Him All the Time" (He's Mine Remix) – 3:59
4. "It Goes On"

== Charts ==
=== Weekly charts ===
Weekly chart performance for "He's Mine"
Chart (1995)	Peak position
New Zealand (Recorded Music NZ)	27
UK Singles (OCC)	70
US Billboard Hot 100	7
US Hot R&B Singles (Billboard)	2
US Cash Box Top 100	8

=== Year-end charts ===
Year-end chart performance for "He's Mine"
Chart (1995)	Position
US Billboard Hot 100	40
US Cash Box Top 100	43

== Certifications ==
Certifications for "He's Mine"
Region	Certification	Certified units/sales
United States (RIAA)	Gold	500,000^{^}
^{^} Shipments figures based on certification alone.
