= Soul for Real =

American R&B group

- Also known as: Soul 4 Real; Soul IV Real; SFR
- Origin: Wyandanch, New York, U.S.
- Genres: R&B; hip hop soul
- Years active: 1992–present
- Labels: Uptown (1994–1997); Chrome Dome/Warlock (1999); Aljoba Music Group (2003–2008); Imperial Ent. LLC.(2011–2014); Leviathan Entertainment Group LLC.
- Members: Jason "Jase" a.k.a. Jase4Real; Brian "Bri"; Andre "Dre" a.k.a. KD; Christopher "Chris" a.k.a. Choc

Soul for Real (also known as Soul 4 Real and Soul IV Real) is an American R&B group from Wyandanch, New York, currently based in Atlanta, Georgia. They are made up of brothers Christopher Sherman Dalyrimple a.k.a. Choc, Andre "Dre" Lamont Dalyrimple a.k.a. KD now, Brian "Bri" Augustus Dalyrimple, and Jason "Jase" Oliver Dalyrimple a.k.a. Jase4Real.

The group was best known in the mid-1990s for their gold-certified hit songs "Candy Rain" and "Every Little Thing I Do" and minor R&B hit "If You Want It" from their platinum-selling debut album Candy Rain.

== Career ==
Formed in 1992, Soul for Real signed with Uptown Records and released their debut album Candy Rain on March 28, 1995. Produced by Heavy D, Candy Rain's first single was the album's title track. The song hit No. 1 on the Billboard Hot R&B/Hip-Hop Songs and peaked at No. 2 on the Hot 100 chart. Their second single, "Every Little Thing I Do", reached No. 11 on the Hot R&B/Hip-Hop Songs and No. 17 on the Hot 100 chart. A third single, "If You Want It", reached No. 53 on the R&B charts.

After touring and the success of their debut album, the group quickly began working on their sophomore album. Soul for Real's second album, For Life, was produced by Sean Combs and released on September 24, 1996. The album peaked at No. 29 on the Billboard R&B chart and No. 119 on the Billboard 200. It was led by the single "Never Felt This Way" which did not gain much airplay. However, the album's second single "Love You So" did much better, peaking at No. 64 on the Hot R&B/Hip-Hop Songs in 1997.

Staying under Heavy D's tutelage, the group moved to independent label Chrome Dome Records for their third album, Heat. After a distribution deal with Tommy Boy Music fell through, Warlock Records took over distribution and released the album on May 18, 1999. The album failed to chart and produced one single, "Can't Wait".

In 2003, the group formed the label Aljoba Music Group (AMG).

In 2007, Soul for Real began to work on their fourth studio album tentatively entitled The Unknown. The first single "One Man" (featuring Jadakiss) was released later that year.

In 2009, Brian Dalyrimple was indicted on 145 counts of aggravated identity (mortgage) fraud; none of his brothers were involved. Following Brian's arrest, the other three brothers, KD (Andre), Jason "Jase" Oliver and Choc (Chris) remained as members of the group and continued on as Soul for Real.

In 2012, they announced that they were in the studio working on their fourth studio album, and have revealed the album title to be The Evolution: Journey. They released a new single titled "Can't Leave U Alone". That same year, the youngest member Jase, went by the name of Jase4Real as a solo artist.

In 2016, Soul for Real released a new single "Love Again" and Jase released a solo single titled "If You Feelin' Like Me (IYFLM)" with a video available on his YouTube channel. The following year, the group released the official video for "Love Again" and premiered it on their VEVO channel. In that same year, Jase4Real also released his third solo effort If You Feel Like Me: The Mixtape.

In 2019, they released two holiday songs "Silent Night" and "Christmas Time Is Here".

In 2020, Soul for Real issued their first single in 4 years, "Love on Me". Shortly after, Jase as well released a new single titled "Due Better".

In November 2021, Soul for Real released a music video for their new single titled "After the Rain", a tribute to their mother who had died within the past year and is pictured on the single’s cover art. In December of that same year, "After the Rain" was released on all digital platforms.

In February 2022, Soul for Real announced on social media they would be appearing on the documentary television series Unsung the following month. The episode aired on TV One on March 6, 2022. In July of that same year, Soul for Real was seen as a guest on Nick Cannon's Wild 'N' Out.

On June 10, 2023, Soul for Real was honored with the Key to the City of their native Wyandanch, New York.

== Solo ventures ==
=== Jason "Jase" ===
Jason, better known as Jase is the lead singer of Soul for Real. He is best known for singing lead on "Candy Rain"; the group's biggest hit to date off the album of the same name.

He went on to pursue a solo career, releasing a few solo projects under the name of Jase4Real. Jase's albums are described as having a clever, hood-sexy sound with lyrics that are ultimately about love and life; it's a true display of mature urban music with crossover appeal.

Other than music, Jase established his own independent production company, Jasemakermusic LLC., based in Atlanta, Ga. In addition, he also started his own label: BEA Music Ent., on which he will release his future projects and collaborate with other upcoming artists.

=== Chris "Choc" ===
Choc is best known for singing lead on "Every Little Thing I Do" the group's second hit off their Candy Rain album.

In 2001, Choc pursued a solo career and released a debut single "Crazy" which failed to achieve any level of success. Later in 2001, he released yet another single, "Make My Move" which had the same result as the debut single of the unreleased album "Choc A Lot". This disappointment made Choc delay music and he began to focus on his personal life.

In 2017, in an effort to make a comeback, Choc-boy released a new single entitled "Want U2 Know", later in the year, Choc4Real released "American Girl" as his second single.

=== Brian "Bri" ===
Brian is quietly residing in Las Vegas, NV. He is now the proud owner of Naomi's Island Cafe.

=== Andre "Dre" ===
In the early 2000s Andre ('Dre) ran an independent production company: Uncle Dre Day Embroideries LLC. On his MySpace, he released some solo music under his alter ego Uncle Dre.

Now Andre "Dre" is known as KD.

== Discography ==
=== Albums ===
List of albums, with selected chart positions and certifications
Title	Details	Peak chart positions		Certifications
Title	Details	US	US R&B	Certifications
Candy Rain	Released: March 28, 1995; Label: Uptown / MCA	23	5	RIAA: Platinum
For Life	Released: September 24, 1996; Label: Uptown / Universal	119	29	
Heat	Released: May 18, 1999; Label: Chrome Dome / Warlock	—	—	

=== Singles ===
List of singles, with selected chart positions and certifications
Title	Year	Chart positions					Certifications	Album
Title	Year	US	US R&B	AUS	NZ	UK	Certifications	Album
"Candy Rain"	1995	2	1	—	50	23	RIAA: Gold	Candy Rain
"Every Little Thing I Do"	1995	17	11	63	28	31	RIAA: Gold	Candy Rain
"If You Want It"	1995	102^{[A]}	53	—	—	—		Candy Rain
"Never Felt This Way"	1996	—	—	—	—	—		For Life...
"Love You So"	1997	117^{[B]}	64	—	—	—		For Life...
"Can't Wait"	1999	—	—	—	—	—		Heat
"One Man" (featuring Jadakiss)	2007	—	—	—	—	—		Non-album singles
"Can’t Leave U Alone" (featuring Amanda Dalyrimple)	2012	—	—	—	—	—		Non-album singles
"Love Again"	2016	—	—	—	—	—		Non-album singles
"Silent Night"	2019	—	—	—	—	—		Non-album singles
"Christmas Time Is Here"	2019	—	—	—	—	—		Non-album singles
"Love on Me"	2020	—	—	—	—	—		Non-album singles
"After the Rain"	2021	—	—	—	—	—		Non-album singles
"No Insecurities"	2024	—	—	—	—	—		Non-album singles

A. "If You Want It" did not enter the US Billboard Hot 100, but peaked at #2 on the Bubbling Under Hot 100 chart.

B. "Love You So" did not enter the US Billboard Hot 100, but peaked at #17 on the Bubbling Under Hot 100 chart.

== Awards and nominations ==
Year	Awards	Category	Nominated work	Result
1996	American Music Award	Favorite Soul/R&B New Artist	—N/a	Nominated
