= Candy Rain (song) =

1994 single by Soul for Real

Single by Soul for Real

from the album Candy Rain
- Released: November 15, 1994
- Genre: R&B
- Length: 4:36
- Label: Uptown; MCA
- Composers: Jean-Claude Olivier; Samuel Barnes; Heavy D
- Lyricists: Heavy D; Terri Robinson
- Producers: Heavy D; Poke; Red Hot Lover Tone

Soul for Real singles chronology
"Candy Rain" (1994)	"Every Little Thing I Do" (1995)

Music video
- "Candy Rain" (Official Music Video) on YouTube

"Candy Rain" is a song by American R&B group Soul for Real, released in 1994 through Uptown and MCA Records. The song was written by Jean-Claude Olivier, Samuel Barnes, Heavy D, and Terri Robinson. It spent three weeks at No. 1 on the US Hot R&B Singles chart and peaked at No. 2 on the US Billboard Hot 100 for four weeks. It was certified gold by the Recording Industry Association of America (RIAA) and sold 800,000 copies.

The song's music video features Heavy D, who also remixed the track; this version samples the 1974 hit song "Mr. Magic" by Grover Washington Jr. The original bassline of "Candy Rain" samples from Minnie Riperton's "Baby, This Love I Have" from her 1975 album Adventures in Paradise.

== Charts ==
=== Weekly charts ===
Chart (1995)	Peak position
New Zealand (Recorded Music NZ)	50
Scottish Singles Sales (Official Charts)	95
UK Singles (Official Charts)	23
UK Dance (Official Charts)	11
UK Hip Hop/R&B (Official Charts)	4
US Billboard Hot 100	2
US Hot R&B Singles (Billboard)	1
US Maxi-Singles Sales (Billboard)	2
US Top 40/Mainstream (Billboard)	20
US Top 40/Rhythm-Crossover (Billboard)	1
US Cash Box Top 100	2

=== Year-end charts ===
Chart (1995)	Position
Brazil (Crowley)	90
US Billboard Hot 100	25
US Hot R&B Singles (Billboard)	5
US Maxi-Singles Sales (Billboard)	12
US Top 40/Rhythm-Crossover (Billboard)	8
US Cash Box Top 100	17

== Certifications ==
Region	Certification	Certified units/sales
United States (RIAA)	Gold	800,000

== Release history ==
Region	Date	Format(s)	Label(s)	Ref.
United States	November 15, 1994	12-inch vinyl; CD; cassette	Uptown; MCA	
Australia	April 24, 1995	CD	MCA	
United Kingdom	June 26, 1995	12-inch vinyl; CD; cassette	MCA	

== See also ==
- List of number-one R&B singles of 1995 (U.S.)
