= Keith Sweat discography =

American R&B artist discography

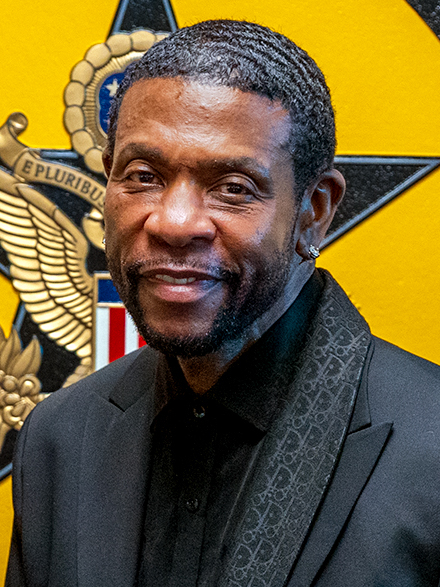
- Sweat in 2023.
- Studio albums: 14
- Live albums: 2
- Compilation albums: 4

American singer Keith Sweat has released 14 studio albums, two live albums, and four compilation albums. Originally a member of a Harlem band called Jamilah, the singer first landed a chance to record as a solo artist for the independent label, Stadium Records, in 1984. In 1987, Sweat was discovered by Vincent Davis and offered a recording contract with his label, Vintertainment Records, then distributed by Elektra Records. In November 1987, the label released Make It Last Forever, his debut album, which sold three million copies domestically. A major success, it produced the US Billboard Hot 100 top five hit "I Want Her" as well as three further top hits on the R&B chart, including its the title track.

Sweat's second album I'll Give All My Love to You was released in June 1990 and marked his first top ten entry on US Billboard 200. Reaching 2× Platinum status, it contained the hit singles "Make You Sweat" and "I'll Give All My Love to You," both of which peaked at the top of the R&B charts. The following year, his third album Keep It Comin' was released. It reached the top 20 of the Billboard 200, with its title track becoming his fourth number one hit on the R&B charts. In June 1994, Sweat released Get Up on It, his fourth album. Another Platinum-seller, it peaked at number eight on the Billboard 200 and produced the R&B top ten hit "How Do You Like It?," a collaboration with Lisa "Left Eye" Lopes.

In June 1996, Elektra released Sweat's self-titled fifth studio album. It became the biggest-selling project within his discography, eventually reaching 4× Platinum in the United States and Gold in Canada, and produced his biggest-charting singles yet, with lead single "Twisted" making it to number two on the Billboard Hot 100 and follow-up "Nobody" peaking at number three on the same chart. Still in the Game, Sweat's next project, was released in September 1998. While not as successful as Keith Sweat, it went Platinum and produced two top 20 hits on the pop charts with "Come and Get with Me" and "I'm Not Ready." 2000's Didn't See Me Coming, introducing a grittier, more street-infused sound. It became his lowest-charting album since Keep It Comin', selling 624,000 copies domestically, but also reached Gold status in the United States.

In August 2002, Sweat released his eighth studio album Rebirth. It debuted and peaked at number 14 on the Billboard 200 and sold 222,000 copies, with "One on One" being issued as the album's only single. In 2004, Elektra released the compilation album The Best of Keith Sweat: Make You Sweat. A top forty success in the United States, it was certified Gold by the Recording Industry Association of America (RIAA), but would mark his final release with the label. Following his departure from Elektra, Sweat produced the holiday album A Christmas of Love, his ninth studio album. Released by Sweat Shop Records and Rhino Records on November 20, 2007, it opened at number 85 on Billboard's Top R&B/Hip-Hop Albums chart. Just Me, his next project and first with Atco Records, debuted and peaked at number 10 on the Billboard 200. It also topped the R&B/Hip-Hop Albums chart, making it his first album to take the summit since his 1996 self-titled album.

Ridin' Solo, Sweat's eleventh studio album, marked his debut with Kedar Entertainment and Fontana Distribution. The album also opened at number one on the US Independent Albums, becoming his first album to do so, and also peaked at number four on the Top R&B/Hip-Hop Albums chart, making it his tenth top ten album on the chart. Later albums did not achieve the same commercial success, though Til the Morning (2011) and Dress to Impress (2016) both entered the top ten on the Top R&B/Hip-Hop Albums chart, and "Good Love," the lead single from Dress to Impress, became Sweat's first number one hit on the US Adult R&B Songs chart. Playing for Keeps, Sweat's 14th studio album, failed to chart in 2018. Its second single "Boomerang," a duet with Candace Price, marked his second chart topper on the Adult R&B Songs, however. In 2024, the standalone song "Lay You Down" became his third single to top the same chart.

== Albums ==
=== Studio albums ===
List of studio albums, with selected chart positions and certifications
Title	Album details	Peak chart positions				Certifications
Title	Album details	US	US R&B	AUS	UK	Certifications
Make It Last Forever	Released: November 24, 1987; Label: Vintertainment, Elektra (60763); Formats: CD, cassette, music download	15	1	—	41	RIAA: 3× Platinum; BPI: Silver
I'll Give All My Love to You	Released: June 12, 1990; Label: Vintertainment, Elektra (60861); Formats: CD, cassette, 12', music download	6	1	—	47	RIAA: 2× Platinum
Keep It Comin'	Released: November 26, 1991; Label: Elektra (61216); Formats: CD, cassette, vinyl, music download	19	1	147	—	RIAA: Platinum
Get Up on It	Released: June 28, 1994; Label: Elektra (61550); Formats: CD, cassette, music download	8	1	111	20	RIAA: Platinum
Keith Sweat	Released: June 25, 1996; Label: Elektra (61707); Formats: CD, cassette, music download	5	1	41	36	RIAA: 4× Platinum; MC: Gold
Still in the Game	Released: September 22, 1998; Label: Elektra (62262); Formats: CD, cassette, music download	6	2	64	62	RIAA: Platinum
Didn't See Me Coming	Released: November 14, 2000; Label: Elektra (62515); Formats: CD, cassette, music download	16	3	113	—	RIAA: Gold
Rebirth	Released: August 13, 2002; Label: Elektra (62785); Formats: CD, cassette, music download	14	7	—	—	
A Christmas of Love	Released: November 20, 2007; Label: Rhino (374332); Formats: CD, music download	—	85	—	—	
Just Me	Released: May 6, 2008; Label: Atco (106556); Formats: CD, music download	10	1	—	—	
Ridin' Solo	Released: June 22, 2010; Label: Kedar (00008); Formats: CD, digital download	13	4	—	—	
Til the Morning	Released: November 8, 2011; Label: KDS Entertainment, E1; Formats: CD, digital download	38	8	—	—	
Dress to Impress	Released: July 22, 2016; Label: KDS Entertainment; Formats: CD, digital download	34	4	—	—	
Playing for Keeps	Released: October 26, 2018; Label: KDS Entertainment; Formats: CD, digital download	—	—	—	—	
"—" denotes releases that did not chart or receive certification.

=== Live albums ===
List of live albums, with selected chart positions
Title	Album details	Peak chart positions	
Title	Album details	US	US R&B
Keith Sweat Live	Released: February 4, 2003; Label: Elektra (62855); Formats: CD, music download	86	34
Sweat Hotel Live	Released: June 12, 2007; Label: Shout! Factory (10477); Formats: CD, music download	—	—
"—" denotes releases that did not chart or receive certification.

=== Compilation albums ===
List of compilation albums, with selected chart positions and certifications
Title	Album details	Peak chart positions			Certifications
Title	Album details	US	US R&B	AUS	Certifications
Just a Touch (The Very Best of)	Released: August 1997; Label: Elektra; Formats: CD	—	—	80	
The Best of Keith Sweat: Make You Sweat	Released: January 13, 2004; Label: Elektra, Rhino (73954); Formats: CD, music download	31	15	—	RIAA: Gold
Harlem Romance: The Love Collection	Released: February 10, 2015; Label: Elektra, Rhino; Formats: CD, music download	—	39	—	
An Introduction to: Keith Sweat	Released: March 7, 2017; Label: Elektra, Rhino; Formats: CD, music download	—	—	—	
"—" denotes releases that did not chart or receive certification.

== Singles ==
=== As a lead artist ===
List of singles as lead artist, with selected chart positions and certifications, showing year released and album name
Title	Year	Peak chart positions						Certifications	Album
Title	Year	US	US R&B	AUS	NLD	NZ	UK	Certifications	Album
"I Want Her"	1987	5	1	—	—	24	26	RIAA: Gold	Make It Last Forever
"Something Just Ain't Right"	1988	79	3	—	—	—	55		Make It Last Forever
"Make It Last Forever" (featuring Jacci McGhee)	1988	59	2	—	—	—	—		Make It Last Forever
"Don't Stop Your Love"	1988	—	9	—	—	—	98		Make It Last Forever
"Make You Sweat"	1990	14	1	—	86	—	—	RIAA: Gold	I'll Give All My Love to You
"Merry Go Round"	1990	—	2	—	—	—	—		I'll Give All My Love to You
"I'll Give All My Love to You"	1990	7	1	148	—	—	—		I'll Give All My Love to You
"Your Love Part 2"	1991	71	4	—	—	—	—		I'll Give All My Love to You
"Keep It Comin'"	1991	17	1	—	—	34	83		Keep It Comin'
"Why Me Baby?" (featuring LL Cool J)	1992	44	2	—	—	—	—		Keep It Comin'
"I Want to Love You Down"	1992	—	20	—	—	—	—		Keep It Comin'
"How Do You Like It?" (featuring Lisa "Left Eye" Lopes)	1994	48	9	166	—	—	71		Get Up On It
"When I Give My Love"	1994	85	21	—	—	—	—		Get Up On It
"Get Up on It" (featuring Kut Klose)	1994	62	12	—	—	—	83		Get Up On It
"Twisted" (featuring Kut Klose and Pretty Russ)	1996	2	1	9	17	1	39	RIAA: Platinum; ARIA: Platinum; RMNZ: Platinum	Keith Sweat
"Nobody" (featuring Athena Cage of Kut Klose)	1996	3	1	22	10	9	30	RIAA: Platinum; RMNZ: Platinum	Keith Sweat
"Just a Touch"	1997	—	38^{[a]}	116	—	—	35		Keith Sweat
"Come with Me" (featuring Ron Isley)	1997	68	27	—	—	—	—		Keith Sweat
"Come and Get with Me" (featuring Snoop Dogg)	1998	12	6	74	—	—	58	RIAA: Gold	Still in the Game
"I'm Not Ready"	1999	16	12	—	—	45	53		Still in the Game
"I'll Trade (A Million Bucks)" (featuring Lil' Mo)	2000	—	36	—	—	—	—		Didn't See Me Coming
"Real Man"	2001	—	73	—	—	—	—		Didn't See Me Coming
"One on One"	2002	—	44	—	—	—	—		Rebirth
"Love You Better" (featuring Keyshia Cole)	2007	—	—	—	—	—	—		Just Me
"Suga Suga Suga" (featuring Paisley Bettis)	2008	—	36	—	—	—	—		Just Me
"Test Drive" (featuring Joe)	2010	—	58	—	—	—	—		Ridin' Solo
"Make You Say Ooh"	2011	—	46	—	—	—	—		Til The Morning
"One on One"	2012	—	—	—	—	—	—		Til The Morning
"Knew It All Along" (featuring Johnny Gill & Gerald Levert)	2012	—	85	—	—	—	—		Til The Morning
"Good Love"	2016	—	21^{[a]}	—	—	—	—		Dress to Impress
"Just the 2 of Us" (featuring Takiya Mason)	2016	—	41^{[a]}	—	—	—	—		Dress to Impress
"Tonight" (featuring Silk)	2017	—	38^{[a]}	—	—	—	—		Dress to Impress
"How Many Ways" (featuring K-Ci)	2018	—	33^{[a]}	—	—	—	—		Playing for Keeps
"Boomerang" (featuring Candace Price)	2018	—	24^{[a]}	—	—	—	—		Playing for Keeps
"Feel Me" (with J-Wonn)	2020	—	—	—	—	—	—		Non-album singles
"Can't Nobody" (featuring Raheem DeVaughn)	2021	—	22^{[a]}	—	—	—	—		Non-album singles
"Lay You Down"	2024	—	20^{[a]}	—	—	—	—		Non-album singles
"With & Wrong (Remix)" (with Lizzen)	2024	—	—	—	—	—	—		On The Bus
"Working" (original with Qing Madi or extended version also with Lil Wayne)	2025	—	—	—	—	—	—		Non-album singles
"Still Got That Good Love" (with King George, Calvin Richardson, Cupid and Roi "Chip" Anthony)	2026	—	—	—	—	—	—		Non-album singles
"—" denotes releases that did not chart or were not released in that territory.

Notes

- ^{^a} denotes peak position on the US R&B/Hip-Hop Airplay chart.

== Production discography ==
Year	Artist	Track	Album
1994	Men at Large	"Don't Cry"	One Size Fits All
1996	Dru Hill	"Love's Train"	Dru Hill
1996	Dru Hill	"Share My World"	Dru Hill
1996	The Isley Brothers	"Slow Is the Way"	Mission to Please
1997	Immature	"Extra Extra"	The Journey
1997	The O'Jays	"Baby You Know"	Love You to Tears
1998	Ol' Skool	"Am I Dreaming"	Ol' Skool
1999	Chantay Savage	"Come Around"	This Time
2010	Dru Hill	"Remain Silent"	InDRUpendence Day
