= The Best of Keith Sweat: Make You Sweat =

Greatest hits album by Keith Sweat
- Released: January 13, 2004
- Recorded: 1987–2000
- Genre: R&B, soul
- Length: 77:18
- Label: Rhino; Elektra

Keith Sweat chronology
Keith Sweat Live (2003)	The Best of Keith Sweat: Make You Sweat (2004)	Sweat Hotel Live (2007)

Professional ratings
Review scores
Source	Rating
AllMusic	4/5 stars

The Best of Keith Sweat: Make You Sweat is a greatest hits album by Keith Sweat. The record was certified Gold by the RIAA in 2005. A DVD collection featuring the videos for the songs on the album was also released in the same year

== Track listing ==
No.	Title	Writer(s)	Original album	Length
1.	"Don't Stop Your Love"	Keith Sweat	Make It Last Forever	4:36
2.	"I Want Her"	Keith Sweat; Teddy Riley	Make It Last Forever	3:43
3.	"Make It Last Forever" (featuring Jacci McGhee)	Keith Sweat; Teddy Riley	Make It Last Forever	4:13
4.	"Nobody" (featuring Athena Cage)	Keith Sweat; Fitzgerald Scott	Keith Sweat	4:13
5.	"How Deep Is Your Love"	Keith Sweat; Teddy Riley	Make It Last Forever	4:51
6.	"Right and a Wrong Way"	Keith Sweat; Teddy Riley	Make It Last Forever	5:16
7.	"Something Just Ain't Right"	Keith Sweat; Teddy Riley	Make It Last Forever	3:40
8.	"Get Up on It" (featuring Kut Klose)	Keith Sweat; Fitzgerald Scott	Get Up On It and Surrender	5:04
9.	"(There You Go) Tellin' Me No Again"	Keith Sweat; Bobby Wooten	New Jack City Soundtrack and Keep It Comin'	5:08
10.	"Merry Go Round"	Keith Sweat; Bobby Douglas	I'll Give All My Love to You	4:55
11.	"Twisted"	Keith Sweat; Eric McCaine; Athena Cage; Lavonn Battle; Tabitha Duncan	Keith Sweat	4:12
12.	"My Body" (By LSG)	Darrell Allamby; Lincoln Browder; Antoinette Roberson	Levert.Sweat.Gill	4:12
13.	"Why Me Baby?"	Keith Sweat; Teddy Riley; James Todd	Keep It Comin'	4:15
14.	"I'll Give All My Love to You"	Keith Sweat; Bobby Wooten	I'll Give All My Love to You	4:32
15.	"Come and Get With Me" (featuring Snoop Dogg)	Keith Sweat; Calvin Broadus; Lee McCallum	Still in the Game	4:55
16.	"Make You Sweat"	Keith Sweat; Timmy Gatling; Bobby Wooten	I'll Give All My Love to You	3:51
17.	"Make It Last Forever (Extended Mix)" (featuring Jacci McGhee)	Keith Sweat; Teddy Riley	Make It Last Forever	5:42
Total length:				77:18

== Charts ==
=== Weekly charts ===
Chart (2004)	Peak position
US Billboard 200	31
US Top R&B/Hip-Hop Albums (Billboard)	15

=== Year-end charts ===
Chart (2004)	Position
US Top R&B/Hip-Hop Albums (Billboard)	81

== Certifications ==
Region	Certification	Certified units/sales
United States (RIAA)	Gold	500,000^{^}
^{^} Shipments figures based on certification alone.
