= Sweat Hotel Live =

Live album by Keith Sweat
- Released: June 12, 2007
- Length: 75:13
- Label: Elektra
- Producer: Keith Sweat

Keith Sweat chronology
Keith Sweat Live (2003)	Sweat Hotel Live (2007)	Just Me (2008)

Sweat Hotel Live is the second live album by American singer Keith Sweat. It was released by Elektra Records on June 12, 2007.

== Critical reception ==
Professional ratings
Review scores
Source	Rating
AllMusic	2.5/5 stars

AllMusic editor Jonathan Widran rated the album two and a half stars out of five. He found that Sweat Hotel Live finds "the R&B singer in fine form on both uptempo grooves and sweet ballads. Backed by a fiery band, Sweat belts out nearly all of his beloved hits, including "I Want Her," "Make It Last Forever," and "I Give All My Love to You." Fans itching for a fix of the New Jack sound in all its glory should give this live set a listen."

== Track listing ==
1. "I Want Her"
2. "Something Just Ain't Right"
3. "Don't Stop Your Love"
4. "I'll Give All My Love to You " (with Monica )
5. "Lose Control" - Silk
6. "Freak Me" - Silk
7. "Make It Last Forever" (with Jackie McGhee )
8. "Right And A Wrong Way
9. "How Deep Is Your Love"
10. "Let's Chill" - Charlie Wilson
11. "Get Up On It" (with Kut Klose)
12. "Twisted" (with Kut Klose)
13. "(There You Go) Tellin' Me No Again" - Akon
14. "Just Got Paid" (with Johnny Kemp, Teddy Riley, Charlie Wilson, Silk, Kut Klose and Jackie McGhee)
15. "Nobody" (with Athena Cage)

== Charts ==
Chart performance for Sweat Hotel Live
Chart (2007)	Peak position
US Top R&B/Hip-Hop Albums (Billboard)	41
