= Make It Last Forever =

Make It Last Forever can refer to:

- Make It Last Forever (album), the 1987 album by the R&B artist Keith Sweat
  - "Make It Last Forever" (song), the 1988 song by the R&B artist Keith Sweat
- "Make It Last Forever", a 2006 song by the R&B/pop singer Ciara from the album Ciara: The Evolution
- "Make It Last Forever", a 2011 song by Taio Cruz from his album TY.O

== See also ==
- Last Forever (disambiguation)
