= Keith Sweat Live =

Live album by Keith Sweat
- Released: February 4, 2003
- Recorded: Washington, D.C.
- Length: 59:32
- Label: Elektra
- Producer: Keith Sweat

Keith Sweat chronology
Rebirth (2002)	Keith Sweat Live (2003)	Sweat Hotel Live (2007)

Keith Sweat Live is the first live album by American singer 'Keith Sweat. Recorded live in Washington, D.C., it was released by Elektra Records on February 4, 2003.

== Critical reception ==
Professional ratings
Review scores
Source	Rating
AllMusic	3/5 stars

AllMusic editor Jonathan Widran rated the album three stars out of five. He felt that "the way Sweat and his band textures backing vocals makes this something of a church experience, with an urgent love message being conveyed by Pastor Keith as the choir echoes in the background [...] You may not sweat from over-groovin', but the passionate heat his productions stir up may do the trick."

== Track listing ==
1. "Something Just Aint Right" – 3:20
2. "Don't Stop Your Love" – 2:33
3. "Freak Me (Interlude)" (featuring Lil 'G) – 2:05
4. "Make It Last Forever" (featuring Calandra Glenn) – 3:15
5. "Right and Wrong Way" – 2:40
6. "How Deep Is Your Love" – 3:25
7. "Merry Go Round" – 4:29
8. "I Want Her" – 4:42
9. "Show Me the Way (Revival)" – 4:14
10. "I'll Give All My Love to You" (featuring Monica) – 5:07
11. "Interlude" – 1:54
12. "My Body" (featuring Gerald Levert & Johnny Gill) – 4:17
13. "Nobody" (featuring Athena Cage) – 6:44
14. "Twisted" – 5:33
15. "(There You Go) Tellin' Me No Again" – 6:23

== Personnel ==
- Keith Sweat – Producer
- Darrell Adams – Background Vocals
- Annamaria DiSanto – Photography
- Dr. David Evans – Performer
- Andre Harris – Performer
- Randy Hutchinson – Performer
- Keith Robinson – Background Vocals, Performer
- Calandra Glenn – Background Vocals, Performer

== Charts ==
Chart performance for Keith Sweat Live
Chart (2003)	Peak position
US Billboard 200	86
US Top R&B/Hip-Hop Albums (Billboard)	34
