= Just Me (Keith Sweat album) =

Studio album by Keith Sweat
- Released: May 13, 2008
- Length: 47:08
- Label: Atco
- Producers: The Ambassadors; Jared Barnes; Battle Roy; Big Veezy; CJ; Roy "Royalty" Hamilton; R. L. Huggar; Anthony M. Jones; Nathan Mooring; Wirlie "Wyl-E" Morris; Keith Sweat; Alphonso "Do Doc" Walker; Teddy Riley

Keith Sweat chronology
A Christmas of Love (2007)	Just Me (2008)	Ridin' Solo (2010)

Just Me is the tenth studio album by American singer Keith Sweat. It was released by Atco Records on May 13, 2008, in the United States. The album marked Sweat's debut with the label following his departure from Elektra Records. Just Me became his first regular album to top the US Top R&B/Hip-Hop Albums in a decade.

== Background ==
Along with a duet with Keyshia Cole, the album reunites Sweat with producer Teddy Riley, as well as former Kut Klose member Athena Cage, with whom he previously worked on "Nobody", a more than a decade, and for which Cage was mentored by him. The album, which also features Chris Conner and Paisley Bettis, is the first album collaboration with Riley since Sweat's studio album Keep It Comin' (1991). Sweat, who executive produced the project, said he named the project Just Me "because I'm giving the people what they expect from me. You hear other artists out here who make the mistake of trying to be trendy. They really try to keep up. I know people want to hear Keith Sweat. I'm conscious of the people who have followed me the whole time, since day one. I remember that I have a fan base and I'm very careful to give the people what they expect from me."

== Critical reception ==
Professional ratings
Review scores
Source	Rating
AllMusic	3/5 stars
Artistdirect	3.5/5 stars

Just Me received mixed-to-positive reviews. AllMusic editor Anthony Tognazzini found that "longtime fans needn’t fear that Sweat has undergone any major changes [...] Just Me is classic Sweat. Uptempo dance tracks would be a distraction, so Sweat sticks to what he does best: contemporary quiet storm that acts as the perfect soundtrack to candlelight and silk sheets. Guest appearances by Keyshia Cole and Athena Cage sweeten the pot, but it’s Sweat’s passionate vocals (not to mention the disc’s slick production) that steal the show." Hillary Brown from Artistdirect described Just Me as a polished, vintage-style Quiet Storm R&B album where Sweat's smooth vocals and sensual songs successfully revive the genre without adding much that is new.

SoulTracks felt that the album was "precisely what the title implies. It's unapologetic, complacent and a predictable effort from one of today's R&B veterans [...]. If Just Me is any indication, Keith is not interested in change at this point in his life. Just Me doesn’t break any ground or beckon many new visitors to his music. Typically, artists don't like to create if there’s a lack of inspiration. Keith Sweat seems to be doing the exact opposite-creating formula on demand." Billboard remarked that Sweat "knows how to surprise but, ultimately, chooses to do what we know him for best. The album's fresh moment is “"Somebody," a love ballad that [...] finds Sweat singing entirely (and out of character) in falsetto. From there, however, Sweat reverts to the languid tempos, explicit bedroom talk and layered, interwoven vocals that are the New Jack's screed."

== Commercial performance ==
Just Me debuted and peaked at number 10 on the US Billboard 200, with first week sales of 37,000 copies, becoming Sweat's first top 10 album there since 1998's Still in the Game. The album also debuted atop the US Top R&B/Hip-Hop Albums chart, making it his first album to take the summit since his 1996 self-titled album.

== Track listing ==
Just Me track listing
No.	Title	Writer(s)	Producer(s)	Length
1.	"Somebody" (featuring Chris "F.L.O." Conner)	Conner; Keith Sweat; Roy "Royalty" Hamilton	Sweat; Hamilton	4:01
2.	"The Floor"	R.L. Huggar; Teddy Riley	Riley	3:27
3.	"Girl of My Dreams"	David D. Brown; Darnell Dalton; Sweat; Lamar Taylor	The Ambassadorz	4:15
4.	"Sexiest Girl"	Battle Roy; Huggar	Sweat; Roy; Huggar^{[b]}	4:00
5.	"Butterscotch" (featuring Athena Cage)	James Veasie; Sweat	Sweat; Big Veezy; Dave Evans^{[b]}	4:19
6.	"Me and My Girl"	Brown; Jared Barnes; Sweat; Nathan Mooring	Sweat; Barnes; Mooring; Evans^{[b]}	4:08
7.	"Suga Suga Suga" (featuring Paisley Bettis)	Denis Bettis; Sweat; Wirlie "Wyl-E" Morris	Morris	4:00
8.	"Never Had a Lover"	Anthony M. Jones; Charles J.; Sweat; Ronald Linton; Hamilton	Jones; CJ; Hamilton	4:28
9.	"Love You Better" (featuring Keyshia Cole)	Sweat	Sweat; Alphonso "Do Doc" Walker	4:36
10.	"Just Wanna Sex You"	Jones; Sweat; Linton; Hamilton	Hamilton	3:21
11.	"What's a Man to Do"	Sweat; Hamilton	Hamilton	3:38
12.	"Teach Me"	Dalton; Sweat; Taylor; Huggar	The Ambassadorz	3:42

Japan bonus tracks
No.	Title	Writer(s)	Producer(s)	Length
13.	"SSShhh (Here We Go Again)"			4:22
14.	"Some More" (featuring Akon)	Sweat; Aliaune Thiam	Akon	3:58

Notes

- ^{^[a]} signifies a co-producer
- ^{^[b]} signifies an additional producer

Sample credits

- "Somebody" samples "What's Come Over Me", performed by Blue Magic.

== Charts ==
=== Weekly charts ===
Weekly chart performance for Just Me
Chart (2008)	Peak position
Japan Albums (Oricon)	133
US Billboard 200	10
US Top R&B/Hip-Hop Albums (Billboard)	1

=== Year-end charts ===
Year-end chart performance for Just Me
Chart (2008)	Position
US Top R&B/Hip-Hop Albums (Billboard)	82
