= Til the Morning =

Studio album by Keith Sweat
- Released: November 8, 2011
- Length: 51:16
- Labels: KDS; eOne
- Producers: Adam Ledgister; Luke Austin; Karlyton "K.K. " Clanton; Angelo Durham; Young Fyre; Rochad Holiday; Marlon McClain; The Platinum Brothers; Steve Russell; Keith Sweat

Keith Sweat chronology
Ridin' Solo (2010)	Til the Morning (2011)	Dress to Impress (2016)

Singles from Til the Morning
- 1. "Make You Say Ooh" Released: August 30, 2011; 2. "One On One" Released: February 21, 2012; 3. "Knew It All Along" Released: March 9, 2012; 4. "Ring Size" Released: June 5, 2012

Til the Morning is the twelfth studio album by American singer Keith Sweat. It was released by KDS Entertainment and eOne Music on November 8, 2011 in the United States.

== Background ==
Til the Morning marked Sweat's first release with eOne Music. The album was originally going to be titled Open Invitation, but Sweat decided to rename the project after discovering that fellow R&B singer Tyrese Gibson had already used that title for his 2011 studio album. Although there were ideas to title the album either Til the Morning or High as the Sun, he ultimately chose the former. In an interview with YouKnowIGotSoul, he commented: "It pretty much sums up the type of music I've done. We already know how it goes down "Til the Morning" and what that concept means. So basically I just named it Til the Morning because it just fit with the album and the songs that are on the album." The album contains the track "One On One", which is written by a different group of songwriters, has different lyrics, and does not have the same melody as the similarly titled song on Sweat's earlier album, Rebirth.

== Critical reception ==
Professional ratings
Review scores
Source	Rating
About.com	2.5/5 stars
AllMusic	2.5/5 stars
Soul in Stereo	3.5/5 stars

In his review for Soul in Stereo, Edward Bowser wrote that Til the Morning was "paint-by-numbers Keith, which, of course, is [...] good news for fans of the laid-back 90s sound. At this point in his career, Keith is sticking to the basics – which means a lot of babies will be born this August." Saule Wright, writing for YouKnowIGotSoul, remarked that the album "proves to be a much better album than his last project and closer to the Keith Sweat we#ve come to know throughout his career. He sounds a lot more comfortable [but] the album is confusing at times and just above average overall." AllMusic editor Andy Kellman wrote that "Sweat is once again assisted by so many (sometimes credited) background singers that one can drop into the album at various points, listen for a few seconds, and hear nothing but other voices. The occasionally pleasing album is mostly slow jam territory with functional and tasteful productions that are sometimes enhanced with low-key synthesizer work."

== Commercial performance ==
Released only a year and a half after his previous album Ridin' Solo (2010), Til the Morning debuted and peaked at number 38 on the US Billboard 200. This marked the lowest chart position achieved by any of Sweat's albums by then – with the exception of his 2007 Christmas album A Christmas of Love. Til the Morning also opened at number six on the Independent Albums and number eight on the US Top R&B/Hip-Hop Albums, becoming his eleventh studio album to enter latter chart.

== Track listing ==
Til the Morning track listing
No.	Title	Writer(s)	Producer(s)	Length
1.	"Candy Store"	Keith Sweat	Sweat; Karlyton "K.K. " Clanton; Marlon McClain; Rochad Holiday	4:35
2.	"Knew It All Along" (featuring Johnny Gill and Gerald Levert)	Sweat; Angelo Durham	Sweat; Durham	5:09
3.	"High as the Sun"	Sweat; Durham; Adam Clinton; Tony DeAngelo Criswell	Sweat; Durham	5:31
4.	"Lady DeJour"	Sweat	Sweat; Steve Russell	4:40
5.	"Make You Say Ooh"	Sweat; Durham; Christopher Newland	Sweat; Durham	3:51
6.	"To the Middle" (featuring T-Pain)	Jon A. Gordon; Michael A. Gordon; Courtney J. Vantrease Jr.; Robert L. Brent III; Tramaine Micheal Winfrey	Young Fyre	3:51
7.	"Ring Size"	Sweat; Steve Russell	Sweat; Russell	4:39
8.	"Til the Morning"	Sweat; Durham; Folando Dante Johnson; Billy Ray Little; Lasasha Van Monet	Sweat	3:54
9.	"Open Invitation"	Sweat; Adam Clinton; Durham; Criswell	Sweat	3:58
10.	"One On One"	Sweat; Adam Gibbs; Luke Austin; Mike Chaser	Sweat; Austin; The Platinum Brothers	4:52
11.	"My Valentine" (featuring Coko of SWV)	Sweat; Durham; Latonya Allen Deloach; Johnson	Sweat; Durham	4:33
12.	"Getaway"	Sweat; Carl "Chip" Days; Adam Ledgister	Sweat	4:36
Total length:				51:16

Best Buy bonus tracks
No.	Title	Writer(s)	Producer(s)	Length
13.	"Love Ballad"			3:29
14.	"Don't Make Me Wait Long"			4:12
15.	"Out of My Element" (featuring Angelo Remo)	Sweat; Durham; Karina Ashley Mims	Sweat; Durham	3:34

Japanese bonus tracks
No.	Title	Writer(s)	Producer(s)	Length
13.	"Out of My Element" (featuring Angelo Remo)	Sweat; Durham; Mims	Sweat; Durham	3:34
14.	"Superwoman"			3:46

== Personnel ==
Credits for Til the Morning adapted from Allmusic.

- Adam Ledgister – instruments
- Adrian Albritton – photography
- Gazelle Alexander – promoter
- Antoine Tatum – backing vocals
- Luke Austin – composer, producer
- Dave Benck – engineer
- Robert Brent – composer
- Mike Chaser – composer
- Karlyton "K.K. " Clanton – composer, producer
- Adam Clinton – composer
- Shawnte Crespo – product manager
- Tony Deangelo Criswell – composer
- Bill Crowley – promoter
- Chip Days Jr. – composer, backing vocals
- Latonya Debouch – composer
- Marleny Dominguez – executive
- Angelo Durham – composer, instruments, backing vocals
- Dave Evans – keyboards, mixing
- Young Fyre – producer
- Adam Gibbs – composer
- Johnny Gill – featured artist
- Jon Gordon – composer
- Michael Aaron Gordon – composer
- Paul Grosso – creative director, design
- Chris Herche – marketing
- Halley Hiatt – assistant
- Rochad Holiday – composer, producer
- Folondo Johnson – composer
- Rolando Johnson – composer
- Gerald Levert – featured artist
- Billy Ray Little – composer
- Marlon McClain – composer, producer
- Giovanna Melchiorre – publicity
- Christopher Newland – composer
- Bob Perry – A&R
- The Platinum Brothers – programming, producer
- Herb Powers – mastering
- Deborah Rigaud – legal advisor
- Sean Rock – promoter
- Steve Russell – composer, producer, instruments, backing vocals
- Olga Santana – engineer, mixing assistant
- Alvin Speights – mixing
- Shadow Stokes – promoter
- Keith Sweat – composer, producer, vocals
- T–Pain – composer, featured artist
- Dontay Thompson – promoter
- Javier Valverde – engineer, mixing
- Lasasha Monet Van – composer
- Courtney Vantrease – composer
- Maurice White – promoter
- Tramaine Winfrey – composer
- Andrew Wright – mixing assistant

== Charts ==
Chart performance for Til the Morning
Chart (2011)	Peak position
US Billboard 200	38
US Independent Albums (Billboard)	6
US Top R&B/Hip-Hop Albums (Billboard)	8
