= List of Billboard number-one R&B albums of 1990 =

These are the Billboard magazine R&B albums that reached number one in 1990.

== Chart history ==
Issue date	Album	Artist
January 6	Tender Lover	Babyface
January 13	Tender Lover	Babyface
January 20	Tender Lover	Babyface
January 27	Back on the Block	Quincy Jones
February 3	Back on the Block	Quincy Jones
February 10	Back on the Block	Quincy Jones
February 17	Back on the Block	Quincy Jones
February 24	Back on the Block	Quincy Jones
March 3	Back on the Block	Quincy Jones
March 10	Back on the Block	Quincy Jones
March 17	Back on the Block	Quincy Jones
March 24	Back on the Block	Quincy Jones
March 31	Back on the Block	Quincy Jones
April 7	Back on the Block	Quincy Jones
April 14	Back on the Block	Quincy Jones
April 21	Tender Lover	Babyface
April 28	Please Hammer, Don't Hurt 'Em	MC Hammer
May 5	Please Hammer, Don't Hurt 'Em	MC Hammer
May 12	Please Hammer, Don't Hurt 'Em	MC Hammer
May 19	Please Hammer, Don't Hurt 'Em	MC Hammer
May 26	Please Hammer, Don't Hurt 'Em	MC Hammer
June 2	Poison	Bell Biv DeVoe
June 9	Please Hammer, Don't Hurt 'Em	MC Hammer
June 16	Please Hammer, Don't Hurt 'Em	MC Hammer
June 23	Please Hammer, Don't Hurt 'Em	MC Hammer
June 30	Johnny Gill	Johnny Gill
July 7	Please Hammer, Don't Hurt 'Em	MC Hammer
July 14	Please Hammer, Don't Hurt 'Em	MC Hammer
July 21	Please Hammer, Don't Hurt 'Em	MC Hammer
July 28	Please Hammer, Don't Hurt 'Em	MC Hammer
August 4	Johnny Gill	Johnny Gill
August 11	Johnny Gill	Johnny Gill
August 18	Please Hammer, Don't Hurt 'Em	MC Hammer
August 25	I'll Give All My Love to You	Keith Sweat
September 1	Please Hammer, Don't Hurt 'Em	MC Hammer
September 8	Please Hammer, Don't Hurt 'Em	MC Hammer
September 15	Please Hammer, Don't Hurt 'Em	MC Hammer
September 22	Please Hammer, Don't Hurt 'Em	MC Hammer
September 29	Please Hammer, Don't Hurt 'Em	MC Hammer
October 6	Please Hammer, Don't Hurt 'Em	MC Hammer
October 13	Please Hammer, Don't Hurt 'Em	MC Hammer
October 20	Please Hammer, Don't Hurt 'Em	MC Hammer
October 27	Please Hammer, Don't Hurt 'Em	MC Hammer
November 3	Please Hammer, Don't Hurt 'Em	MC Hammer
November 10	Please Hammer, Don't Hurt 'Em	MC Hammer
November 17	Please Hammer, Don't Hurt 'Em	MC Hammer
November 24	Please Hammer, Don't Hurt 'Em	MC Hammer
December 1	Please Hammer, Don't Hurt 'Em	MC Hammer
December 8	Please Hammer, Don't Hurt 'Em	MC Hammer
December 15	Please Hammer, Don't Hurt 'Em	MC Hammer
December 22	I'm Your Baby Tonight	Whitney Houston
December 29	I'm Your Baby Tonight	Whitney Houston

== See also ==
- 1990 in music
- R&B number-one hits of 1990 (USA)
