= I'm Not Ready =

I'm Not Ready may refer to:

- "I'm Not Ready" (Keith Sweat song)
- "I'm Not Ready" (Michael Bolton song), with Delta Goodrem, who also recorded a solo version
