= Dress to Impress (album) =

Studio album by Keith Sweat
- Released: July 22, 2016
- Length: 66:23
- Label: KDS

Keith Sweat chronology
Til the Morning (2011)	Dress to Impress (2016)	Playing for Keeps (2018)

Dress to Impress is the thirteenth studio album by American singer Keith Sweat. It was released on July 22, 2016 by KDS Entertainment.

== Critical reception ==
Professional ratings
Review scores
Source	Rating
AllMusic	3.5/5 stars
Knoxville News Sentinel	3.5/5 stars

Andy Kellman from AllMusic found that Dress to Impress features Sweat's "best round of songs in well over a decade," focusing on "romance and emotional connection. The album sounds fresh while drawing from numerous eras, just as the Sweat Hotel playlist roams from decade to decade [...] With its stream-fishing quantity of songs notwithstanding — 16 cuts, well over an hour in duration — Dress to Impress fulfills its intent." The Knoxville News Sentinel wrote that "there's nothing remotely creative about Keith Sweat's monochromatic new Dress to Impress, and the veteran R&B singer sounds like he's on autopilot through most of the 16 songs. And yet despite the perfunctory feel of the music and the endless clichéd lyrics that are so obvious they could be a parody, Dress to Impress accomplishes its mission."

== Commercial performance ==
Sweat's first album in five years, Dress to Impress debuted and peaked at number 34 on the US Billboard 200. The album also opened at number three on the Independent Albums and number six on the US Top R&B/Hip-Hop Albums, becoming his twelfth studio album to enter latter chart.

== Track listing ==
Dress to Impress track listing
No.	Title	Writer(s)	Producer(s)	Length
1.	"Good Love"	Derek "D.O.A." Allen; Jason Z. Scott; Keith Sweat	Scott; Sweat; Allen^{[a]}	3:44
2.	"Tonight" (featuring Silk)	Charlie Wilson; Gary Glenn; Sweat; Wirlie Morris	Morris	4:09
3.	"Just the 2 of Us" (featuring Takiya Mason)	Sweat; Morris	Morris	3:45
4.	"Pulling Out the One"	Francesca "Francci" Richard; Sweat; Tierce "Kizzo" Person; Tony Haynes	Person	3:30
5.	"Special Night"	Sweat; Edward Perkins	Sweat; Perkins	4:34
6.	"Back and Forth"	Sweat; Allen; Gerald Isaac; Mike "Big Mike" Heart	Sweat; Allen; Isaac; Heart	4:04
7.	"Give You All of Me"	Sweat; Morris	Morris	4:07
8.	"Missing You Like Crazy" (featuring Dru Hill)	Jerry Flowers; Sweat	Flowers; Sweat	4:42
9.	"Lovers and Friends"	Andrae Lamont Alexander; Richard; Sweat; Person; Tony Haynes	Person	4:05
10.	"Feels Good"	Karen Anderson; Sweat	Scott	4:24
11.	"Better Love"	Sweat; Morris	Morris	4:53
12.	"Dressed to Impress"	Sweat; Adam Gibbs; Luke Austin; Mike Chesser; Mason	Gibbs; Austin; Chesser	4:21
13.	"Can't Let You Go"	Sweat; Allen; Isaac; Phillip "Taj" Jackson	Allen; Isaac; Jackson	4:17
14.	"Say"	Alexander; Richard; Sweat; Person; Tony Haynes	Person	3:35
15.	"Get It In"	Sweat; Allen; Isaac	Allen; Isaac	4:03
16.	"Let's Go to Bed" (featuring Gerald Levert)	Sweat; Allen; Isaac	Allen; Isaac	4:06

Japanese bonus tracks
No.	Title	Length
17.	"I Want You More"	4:01
18.	"Spend the Night"	4:13

Notes

- ^{^a} denotes co-producer(s)

== Charts ==
Chart performance for Dress to Impress
Chart (2016)	Peak position
US Billboard 200	34
US Independent Albums (Billboard)	3
US Top R&B/Hip-Hop Albums (Billboard)	4
