= How Many Ways (disambiguation) =

"How Many Ways" is a 1994 single by Toni Braxton.

How Many Ways may also refer to:

- "How Many Ways", a song by Murray Head, from the 1979 album Between Us
- "How Many Ways", a theme song of the television series Rules of Engagement by Señor Happy
- "How Many Ways", a 2018 song by Keith Sweat
