= Didn't See Me Coming =

2000 studio album by Keith Sweat

Studio album by Keith Sweat
- Released: November 14, 2000
- Length: 59:52
- Label: Elektra
- Producers: Jules Bartholomew; Bobby Crawford; Dee Dee; Wayne Grimsley; Steve "Stone" Huff; Rodney Jerkins; Kevin Johnson; Andrew Lane; Gene Peoples; Barry Salter; Walter "Mucho" Scott; Spanky Williams

Keith Sweat chronology
Still in the Game (1998)	Didn't See Me Coming (2000)	Rebirth (2002)

Singles from Didn't See Me Coming
- 1. "I'll Trade (A Million Bucks)" Released: October 31, 2000; 2. "Real Man" Released: February 2001

Didn't See Me Coming is the seventh studio album by American singer Keith Sweat. It was released by Elektra Records on November 14, 2000, in the United States. The album was certified Gold by the Recording Industry Association of America (RIAA) on January 24, 2001.

== Background ==
In September 1998, Sweat released Still in the Game, his sixth studio album with Elektra Records. The album opened at number six on the US Billboard 200 and became his sixth consecutive platinum seller, with lead single "Come and Get with Me" featuring Snoop Dogg making it to the top ten on the US R&B charts. For his next project, the singer, long recognized for his love songs, set out to craft a grittier, street-infused sound — one that would allow him to explore tougher themes and push his lyrical boundaries. As a result, he consulted a fresh set of collaborators to work on new material, including rappers Busta Rhymes, Rah Digga, and Lil Wayne as well as R&B singers Dave Hollister, Lil Mo and T-Boz from TLC.

== Critical reception ==
Professional ratings
Review scores
Source	Rating
AllMusic	4/5 stars
The Encyclopedia of Popular Music	3/5 stars
Entertainment Weekly	B+

Entertainment Weekly wrote that "on Didn't See Me Coming, his seventh solo effort in 12 years, the former new-jack maestro grooves as compellingly and aches as convincingly as ever. And talk about vocal presence: Even with cameos from scene-stealers like Busta Rhymes, T-Boz, and Rah Digga, Coming clearly remains a Keith Sweat joint." AllMusic editor Ed Hogan found that with the album, the singer "showcases his versatility and adaptability [...] Sweat supplies the album with some of his trademark "beggin'" songs [...] After five platinum albums, two gold singles, and this fine addition, those who didn't see Keith Sweat coming will have "to recognize."

Tiffany Madera, writing for The Phoenix New Times, felt that with Didn't See Me Coming "Sweat has transformed himself into a watered-down, whining, would-be hip-hopper. This is not owing to his vocal quality, but rather the trite and played-out themes of his new songs. Giving in to the unfortunate trend in pop music to portray women as gold-digging, needy, dependent, unfaithful and conniving, Didn't See Me Coming presents a slew of scenarios that are comparable in depth to, say, "Big Pimpin" by Jay-Z." Natasha Washington from The Oklahoman called the album a "disappointment." She noted that "although these producers have what it takes to collaborate on new material, Sweat simply doesn't live up to the success of his previous albums. Although Sweat extends an invitation to several artists [...] to join him on the album, his vocals take a backseat to everything else."

== Chart performance ==
Didn't See Me Coming debuted and peaked at number 16 on the US Billboard 200 and number three on the Top R&B/Hip-Hop Albums chart in the week of December 2, 2000. It was Sweat's lowest-charting album since 1991's Keep It Comin'. On January 24, 2001, it was certified Gold by the Recording Industry Association of America (RIAA). By July 2006, Didn't See Me Coming had sold 624,000 copies domestically, according to Nielsen SoundScan.

== Track listing ==
Didn't See Me Coming track listing
No.	Title	Writer(s)	Producer(s)	Length
1.	"Intro"	Keith Sweat; Steve "Stone" Huff	Huff	1:05
2.	"Things" (featuring Busta Rhymes & Rah Digga)	Sweat; Huff	Huff	3:48
3.	"Whatcha Like" (featuring Strings)	Bobby Crawford; Curtis Jefferson; Dorna Jenkins; Sweat; Marinna Teal	Crawford	4:04
4.	"Satisfy You"	Huff	Huff	2:53
5.	"I Put U On"	Fred Jerkins III; Sweat; LaShawn Daniels; Rodney Jerkins	R. Jerkins	4:13
6.	"He Say She Say" (featuring T-Boz)	Andrew Lane; D. Jenkins; Sweat	Lane; Dee Dee	3:56
7.	"Real Man"	Lane; Sweat; S. Jenkins	Lane; Dee Dee	4:31
8.	"Kiss You"	D. Jenkins; Kevin Johnson; Sweat	Johnson	4:36
9.	"I'll Trade (A Million Bucks) (Interlude)" (featuring Lil' Mo)	Cynthia Loving	Barry Salter; Jules Bartholomew	0:56
10.	"Don't Have Me" (featuring Dave Hollister)	Lane; D. Jenkins; J. Watford; Sweat; S. Trapp	Lane; Dee Dee	4:05
11.	"Tonite"	E. Scott; Sweat	Walter "Mucho" Scott	0:50
12.	"Caught Up"	Gene Peoples; Sweat; Spanky Williams; G. Spencer III	Peoples; Williams	5:18
13.	"Games"	Huff	Huff	4:12
14.	"I'll Trade (A Million Bucks)" (featuring Lil' Mo)	Loving	Salter; Bar Tholomew	3:26
15.	"Only Wanna Please You"	Derrick Culler; Sweat; Palmer Williams; Wayne Grimsley	Grimsley	3:56
16.	"Why U Treat Me So Cold" (featuring Lil Wayne)	Sweat; Huff	Huff	3:53

Bonus track
No.	Title	Writer(s)	Producer(s)	Length
17.	"I'll Trade (A Million Bucks) (Remix)" (featuring Lil' Mo)	Loving; W. Scott	Sweat; W. Scott	3:26

International bonus track
No.	Title	Writer(s)	Producer(s)	Length
18.	"Dieser Brief (German/English Version)" (with Ayman)	Mike Michaels; MM Dollar; Mark Tabak	Michaels; Dollar	3:47

== Personnel ==
- Keith Sweat – producer, executive producer
- Busta Rhymes – performer
- Lil' Mo – arranger, vocal arrangement
- Rah Digga – performer
- Andrew Lane – producer, writer
- Karl Heilbron – engineer, mix engineer

== Charts ==
=== Weekly charts ===
Weekly chart performance for Didn't See Me Coming
Chart (2000)	Peak position
Australian Albums (ARIA)	113
Dutch Albums (Album Top 100)	76
French Albums (SNEP)	55
German Albums (Offizielle Top 100)	55
US Billboard 200	16
US Top R&B/Hip-Hop Albums (Billboard)	5

=== Year-end charts ===
Year-end chart performance for Didn't See Me Coming
Chart (2001)	Position
US Billboard 200	156
US Top R&B/Hip-Hop Albums (Billboard)	53

== Certifications ==
Certifications for Didn't See Me Coming
Region	Certification	Certified units/sales
United States (RIAA)	Gold	500,000^{^}
^{^} Shipments figures based on certification alone.
