= I'll Trade (A Million Bucks) =

2000 single by Keith Sweat

Single by Keith Sweat featuring Lil' Mo

from the album Didn't See Me Coming
- Released: October 31, 2000
- Recorded: The Sweat Shop (Atlanta)
- Length: 4:06
- Label: Elektra; Warner
- Songwriter(s): Cynthia "Lil' Mo" Loving
- Producer(s): Barry Salter; Keith Sweat; Jules Bartholomew

Keith Sweat singles chronology
"I'm Not Ready" (1998)	"I'll Trade (A Million Bucks)" (2000)	"Real Man" (2001)

Lil' Mo singles chronology
"Whatever" (2000)	"I'll Trade (A Million Bucks)" (2000)	"Put It on Me" (2000)

"I'll Trade (A Million Bucks)" is a song by American R&B singer Keith Sweat featuring Lil' Mo. Written by the latter and produced by Sweat along with Barry Salter and Jules Bartholomew, it was recorded for his seventh album, Didn't See Me Coming (2000). An autotuned remix produced by Walter "Mucho" Scott was released to vinyl pressings and appeared on Sweat's album as an interlude in the form of a snippet.

== Background ==
Sweat confirmed in an interview with Billboard that the concept behind the song was self-explanatory as given in the song's title. He further explained, "I'll trade whatever I have to have somebody who's down with me for me. That person doesn't have to have a million bucks. It pertains to anybody who has just a little something." In addition, Sweat was in talks to release an international remix featuring South African songstress Lebo Mathosa, however it was never released. At the time of its recording, the South African press revealed that Mathosa had recorded her vocals in a Johannesburg studio and sent it off to the US for final mixing.

== Critical reception ==
The song met generally favorable reviews. Elysa Gardner from Vibe named the song a "slow-groove scorcher" and praised Lil' Mo for her capability in being a "sexy duet partner." Vinny Brown, PD of New York City's radio station WBLS-FM cited the single as being "classic Keith Sweat," and added: "Keith has proven to be a core artist... [and] continues to give the people what they want." AllMusic editor Ed Hogan nicknamed the track a "lonely superstar duet ballad."

== Chart performance ==
"I'll Trade (A Million Bucks)" peaked at number 26 on the US Hot R&B/Hip-Hop Songs chart and number 34 on the US Hot R&B/Hip-Hop Airplay chart. While the song went on to attain strong urban radio airplay, it failed to make an entry on the US Billboard Hot 100, making it Sweat's first lead single from an album to miss that chart.

== Music video ==
A music video for "I'll Trade (A Million Bucks)" was directed by J. Jesses Smith and premiered on BET in late September 2000.

== Track listings ==
Digital download

1. "I'll Trade (A Million Bucks)" (Radio Edit) — 4:06

12" vinyl

1. "I'll Trade (A Million Bucks)" (Remix)
2. "I'll Trade (A Million Bucks)" (Remix Instrumental)
3. "I'll Trade (A Million Bucks)" (Album Version)
4. "I'll Trade (A Million Bucks)" (Instrumental)
5. "I'll Trade (A Million Bucks)" (Acappella)

== Charts ==
Chart performance for "I'll Trade (A Million Bucks)"
Chart (2000)	Peak position
US Hot R&B/Hip-Hop Songs (Billboard)	36
