= When I Give My Love =

1994 single by Keith Sweat

Single by Keith Sweat

from the album Get Up on It
- Released: 1994
- Length: 6:05
- Label: Elektra
- Songwriters: Keith Sweat; Fitzgerald Scott; Joe Jefferson
- Producers: Sweat; Scott; Jefferson

Keith Sweat singles chronology
| "How Do You Like It?" (1994) | "When I Give My Love" (1994) | "Get Up on It" (1994) |

Audio video
- "When I Give My Love" on YouTube

"When I Give My Love" is a song by American singer and songwriter Keith Sweat, released in 1994 by Elektra Records as the second single from his fourth studio album, Get Up on It (1994). It was both written and produced by Sweat, Fitzgerald Scott, and Joe Jefferson. The song peaked at numbers 79 and 85 on the US Cash Box Top 100 and Billboard Hot 100 charts. A ballad, the song was described by Jose F. Promis of AllMusic as "pure Keith Sweat" in regard to style.

== Charts ==
| Chart (1994) | Peak position |
|---|---|
| US Billboard Hot 100 | 85 |
| US Hot R&B/Hip-Hop Songs (Billboard) | 21 |
| US Cash Box Top 100 | 79 |
