= Why Me Baby? =

1991 song by Keith Sweat featuring LL Cool J

Single by Keith Sweat featuring LL Cool J

from the album Keep It Comin'
- Released: 1992
- Recorded: 1991
- Length: 5:27
- Label: Elektra
- Songwriters: Keith Sweat; James Smith; Teddy Riley
- Producers: Sweat; Riley

Keith Sweat singles chronology
"Keep It Comin'" (1991)	"Why Me Baby?" (1992)	"I Want to Love You Down" (1992)

LL Cool J singles chronology
"Strictly Business" (1991)	"Why Me Baby?" (1992)	"Keep It Comin'" (1993)

Music video
- "Why Me Baby?" on YouTube

"Why Me Baby?" is a song by American singer Keith Sweat featuring American rapper LL Cool J, and the second single from the former's third studio album Keep It Comin' (1991). It was produced by Sweat and Teddy Riley.

A remix of the song titled "Why Me Baby (Part 2)", produced by Sweat and Marley Marl, was released in 1992.

== Composition ==
Arion Berger of Entertainment Weekly wrote of Keith Sweat's performance, "For the first time, the singer sounds more relaxed and insinuating on the smoothies than on the workouts, letting his not-very-supple voice flutter mournfully around 'Why Me Baby'".

== Charts ==
Chart (1992)	Peak position
US Billboard Hot 100	44
US Hot R&B/Hip-Hop Songs (Billboard)	2
US Hot Rap Songs (Billboard)	4
