= Surrender (Kut Klose album) =

1995 studio album by Kut Klose

Studio album by Kut Klose
- Released: March 14, 1995
- Genre: R&B
- Length: 50:42
- Label: Elektra
- Producers: Keith Sweat; Fitzgerald Scott; Eric McCaine; John Howcott; Emmanuel Officer; Donald Parks

Singles from Surrender
- 1. "I Like" Released: February 7, 1995; 2. "Lovely Thang" Released: 1995; 3. "Surrender" Released: 1995

Professional ratings
Review scores
Source	Rating
AllMusic	3/5 stars

Surrender is the only studio album by American R&B group Kut Klose. It was released on March 14, 1995, through Elektra Records, and was primarily produced by the group's mentor Keith Sweat. The album was met with mild commercial success, making it to three Billboard charts and peaking at number 66 on the Billboard 200.

Three singles were released from the album. "Lovely Thang" and "Surrender" both became minor hits on the R&B singles chart, while the album's lead single "I Like" peaked at number 34 on the Billboard Hot 100, becoming the group's only Top 40 hit.

In April 2026, Surrender was released on vinyl for the first time in the United States under Real Gone Music in time for Record Store Day.

== Track listing ==
1. "Lay My Body Down" – 4:19
2. "Don't Change" – 4:24
3. "Get Up on It" – 5:06
4. "Do Me" – 4:44
5. "Lovely Thang" – 4:19
6. "Surrender" – 5:18
7. "I Like" – 4:23
8. "Keep On" – 3:16
9. "Giving You My Love Again" – 5:23
10. "Sexual Baby" – 4:42
11. "Like You've Never Been Done" – 4:48

== Charts ==
=== Weekly charts ===
Weekly chart performance for Surrender
Chart (1995)	Peak position
UK Dance Albums (Music Week)	2
US Billboard 200	66
US Top R&B/Hip-Hop Albums (Billboard)	12
US Top Heatseekers Albums (Billboard)	4
