= Keep It Comin' (song) =

Single by Keith Sweat

from the album Keep It Comin'
- Released: November 21, 1991 (Cassette); November 27, 1991 (Vinyl)
- Genre: New jack swing
- Length: 4:10
- Label: Elektra
- Songwriters: Keith Sweat; George Karras; Joe Carter, Joseph Sayles, Dwight Wyatt, Kevin Scott; Lionel Job
- Producers: Keith Sweat; Lionel Job

Keith Sweat singles chronology
| "Your Love (Part 2)" (1991) | "Keep It Comin'" (1991) | "Why Me Baby?" (1992) |

Music video
- "Keep It Comin'" on YouTube

"Keep It Comin'" is a song by American singer and songwriter Keith Sweat, released in November 1991 by Elektra Records as the first single from his third studio album, Keep It Comin' (1991). It features a sample of Kool and the Gang's 1973 hit "Jungle Boogie" and was both co-written and co-produced by Sweat. The song peaked at numbers 16 and 17 on the US Cash Box Top 100 and Billboard Hot 100 charts, and spent two weeks at number one on the Billboard R&B Singles chart.

== Track listing ==
- 12" single #1

A1. "Keep It Comin'" (12" Mix) (5:47)
A2. "Keep It Comin'" (Hip Hop Mix With Rap) (3:56)
A3. "Keep It Comin'" (Radio Mix) (4:09)
B1. "Keep It Comin'" (Smooth Mix) (5:21)
B2. "Keep It Comin'" (Hip Hop Mix Without Rap) (3:56)

- 12" single #2

A1. "Keep It Comin'" (Funky House Mix)*
A2. "Keep It Comin'" (Gangster Mix)*
A3. "Keep It Comin'" (Hip Hop Mix With Rap)
A4. "Keep It Comin'" (Background Dub)*
B1. "Keep It Comin'" (Twelve Inch Mix)
B2. "Keep It Comin'" (Smooth Mix)
B3. "Keep It Comin'" (Masters At Work Dub)*

* remixed by Masters at Work.

== Charts ==
=== Weekly charts ===
| Chart (1991–1992) | Peak position |
|---|---|
| Canada (RPM) | 79 |
| Europe (European Dance Radio) | 10 |
| New Zealand (Recorded Music NZ) | 34 |
| UK Singles (OCC) | 83 |
| UK Dance (Music Week) | 27 |
| UK Club Chart (Music Week) | 75 |
| US Billboard Hot 100 | 17 |
| US Dance Club Songs (Billboard) | 25 |
| US Hot R&B/Hip-Hop Songs (Billboard) | 1 |
| US Cash Box Top 100 | 16 |

=== Year-end charts ===
| Chart (1992) | Position |
|---|---|
| US Billboard Hot 100 | 94 |
| US Hot R&B/Hip-Hop Songs (Billboard) | 14 |

== See also ==
- List of Hot R&B Singles number ones of 1992
