= How Do You Like It? =

1994 single by Keith Sweat

Single by Keith Sweat featuring Lisa Lopes

from the album Get Up on It
- Released: March 28, 1994
- Recorded: 1993
- Genre: New jack swing; hip hop; soul
- Label: Elektra
- Songwriter: Sweat/Scott/Jefferson/Lopes

Keith Sweat singles chronology
"I Want to Love You Down" (1993)	"How Do You Like It?" (1994)	"When I Give My Love" (1994)

Lisa Lopes singles chronology
"How Do You Like It?" (1994)	"Freedom" (1995)

Audio video
- "How Do You Like It?" on YouTube

"How Do You Like It?" is a song by American R&B singer and songwriter Keith Sweat, released in March 1994 by Elektra Records from his fourth album, Get Up on It (1994), and features Lisa "Left Eye" Lopes of TLC. The song peaked at numbers 48 and 50 on the US Billboard Hot 100 and Cash Box Top 100 charts, and number nine on the Billboard R&B Singles chart. In the UK, it reached number 71 on the UK Singles Chart and number 25 on the Music Week Dance Singles chart. Its accompanying music video was directed by Lionel C. Martin.

The song makes up the first two tracks on the album Get Up on It, first as an interlude, then as the full-length song.

== Critical reception ==
Larry Flick from Billboard magazine wrote, "Sweat is true to form as he previews the forthcoming Get Up on It. He struts like the only lover-man on the planet, atop a muscular jack-swing/hip-hop groove that is as sexy and infectious as the song's words. All the elements for a massive, multiformat, and much-deserved hit are in place. All ya gotta do is wait and watch radio programmers fall in line."

Ralph Tee from Music Week's RM Dance Update commented, "The biggest new soul tune of the week, Sweat is back with a prelude to his forthcoming Get Up on It set for Elektra. At a mid-tempo pace, the lead vocals whine away over assorted tripping rhythms, the drum patterns slightly altered on each of the four mixes. Elsewhere the poking synth bass, girlie vocals and rather unusual 'Smurf' rap by Lisa 'Left Eye' Lopes remain common throughout, all making for a strong new single. There are also some hip hop crowd style "Ho!s" for extra dancefloor effect, while the song is melodic enough to be extremely radio friendly too." In his weekly RM dance column, James Hamilton named it a "lushly whined and perky Lisa 'Left Eye' Lopes rapped groin grinding tight slow jam".

== Music video ==
The music video for "How Do You Like It?" was directed by American director Lionel C. Martin and filmed in New York. It was produced by Joe Larrier.

== Charts ==
Chart (1994)	Peak position
Australia (ARIA)	166
UK Singles (OCC)	71
UK Dance (Music Week)	25
UK Club Chart (Music Week)	46
US Billboard Hot 100	48
US Dance Singles Sales (Billboard)	17
US Hot R&B Singles (Billboard)	9
US Cash Box Top 100	50
