= Roy Hamilton III =

- Also known as: Roy "Royalty" Hamilton
- Born: Roy Hamilton III
- Origin: Queens, New York, U.S.A.
- Genres: Pop, electro house, R&B, hip hop, rock, gospel
- Occupations: Record producer, Songwriter, A&R
- Years active: 1997–present
- Label: Capitol Records
- Website: https://www.thesingerscompany.com/

Roy Hamilton III is an American record producer and songwriter in the genres of pop, Christian gospel, and R&B.

Hamilton is a Berklee College of Music graduate and the grandson of the American singer Roy Hamilton Sr.

== Production career ==
In 2000, Hamilton co-wrote and co-produced Joe's #1 single "Stutter". In 2002, Hamilton executive produced the Keith Sweat album Rebirth, which debuted at No. 7 on the Billboard R&B Charts.

In 2004, Hamilton was hired by Capitol Records in Hollywood, California. In 2006, Hamilton was hired by Adrienne Bailon as musical director for her Cheetah Girls 2 summer world tour. He co-produced "Last Time," the third single from Canadian musician George Nozuka's album Believe; "Last Time" peaked at No. 1 on the Much Music DAILY 10. Hamilton also helped in the A&R and song placement process of the 2009 R. Kelly song "Number One".

In 2010, Hamilton co-produced music in the film Standing Ovation.

Hamilton currently works with the U.S.A./Canada based record label The Singer's Company Inc., as the Director of A&R to develop their music artists internationally.

== Production discography ==
=== Singles ===
Year	Artist	Song	Notes
1998	Kelly Price ft. R. Kelly & Ron Isley	"Friend of Mine (Rmx)"	No. 1 R&B, No. 12 Pop
2001	Joe	"Stutter"	No. 1 Pop, No. 1 R&B, No. 7 UK
2001	K-Ci & JoJo	"Wanna Do You Right"	No. 60 R&B
2002	Michael Jackson	"Shout"	b-side of "Cry" int'l release
2008	Cene (& remix ft. Shawty Lo)	"My Bumper"	
2008	George Nozuka	"Last Time"	Top 10 Canada
2018	Luka "FOTUS" Volkov	"Affirmation"	
