= Last Forever (disambiguation) =

"Last Forever" is the series finale of American TV series How I Met Your Mother.

Last Forever may also refer to:

- "Last Forever", a song by the Naked and Famous from their 2016 album Simple Forms
- "Last Forever", a song by Oliver from their 2017 album Full Circle
- "Last Forever", a 2009 song by Kim Petras
- "Last Forever", a song by (G)I-dle from their 2024 EP I Sway
- "Last Forever", a song by Tyga from his 2026 album Starface

== See also ==
- Make It Last Forever (disambiguation)
