= Ridin' Solo (album) =

Studio album by Keith Sweat
- Released: June 22, 2010
- Length: 49:56
- Labels: Kedar; Fontana
- Producers: Chuckii Booker; Adam Ledgister; Wirlie Morris; The Platinum Brothers; Angelo Remon; Steven Russell; Keith Sweat; Tank

Keith Sweat chronology
Just Me (2008)	Ridin' Solo (2010)	Til the Morning (2011)

Ridin' Solo is the eleventh studio album by American R&B singer Keith Sweat. It was released on June 22, 2010, by Kedar Entertainment and Fontana Distribution. It debuted at number 13 on the US Billboard 200, also reaching number four on the US Top R&B/Hip-Hop Albums chart.

== Critical reception ==
Professional ratings
Review scores
Source	Rating
AllMusic	2/5 stars
Soul in Stereo	3.5/5 stars

In his review for Soul in Stereo, Edward Bowser wrote that "Keith doesn't stray far from his roots [but] sometimes, though, the album is a little too safe [...] and other times, Keith uncharacteristically stumbles out of his comfort zone." He concluded: ""While not as stellar as Keith's '08 studio comeback Just Me, Ridin' Solo will fill the void of left by current R&B artists who are more concerned with creating crappy pop songs these days." AllMusic editor Andy Kellman found that "due to a number of factors, Ridin' Solo is the least significant volume of Sweat's discography [...] Sweat can't be knocked for riding the Auto-Tune gravy train, not when his use of vocal effects can be traced back 20-plus years. Then again, Ridin' Solo, the singer's tenth proper studio album, is slathered in it. Part of that is out of necessity; Sweat's voice, once a smooth whine, often hits a grainy strain, and it's also cloaked by a number of background vocalists who occasionally step in front to perform the hooks."

== Commercial performance ==
Ridin' Solo debuted and peaked at number 13 on the US Billboard 200, with first week sales of 37,000 copies. The album also opened at number one on the US Independent Albums chart, Sweat's first album to do so, and peaked at number four on the US Top R&B/Hip-Hop Albums, becoming his tenth studio album to enter the top ten of the chart.

== Track listing ==
Ridin' Solo track listing
No.	Title	Writer(s)	Producer(s)	Length
1.	"Famous"	Keith Sweat; Wirlie Morris	Sweat; Morris	3:57
2.	"Full Time Lover"	Morris; Carl M. Days, Jr.; Sweat	Sweat; Morris	3:49
3.	"Test Drive" (featuring Joe)	Michael Chesser; Adam Gibbs; Luke Austin; David Brown	Brown	5:05
4.	"Ridin' Solo"	Sweat; Remon; Billy Ray Little	Remon; Little; Sweat	4:13
5.	"Genius Girl"	Morris; Carl M. Days, Jr.; Sweat	Sweat; Morris	4:28
6.	"Do Wrong Tonight"	Steven Russell; Durrell Babbs	Tank; Russell	3:35
7.	"Hood Sex"	Sweat; Remon	Sweat; Remon	4:34
8.	"It's All About You"	Morris; Carl M. Days, Jr.; Sweat	Sweat; Morris	4:20
9.	"I'm the One You Want"	Adam Ryan; Christopher Led; Sweat	Sweat; Adam Ledgister	4:21
10.	"Live in Person"	Morris; Carl M. Days, Jr.; Sweat	Sweat; Morris	4:48
11.	"It's a Shame"	Ryan; Led; Sweat	Sweat; Ledgister	4:43
12.	"Tropical"	Morris; Carl M. Days, Jr.; Sweat	Sweat; Morris	4:37
Total length:				49:56

Deluxe edition bonus tracks
No.	Title	Writer(s)	Producer(s)	Length
13.	"Dancin' with My Girl"	Sweat; Morris	Sweat; Morris	4:07
14.	"Reverse"	Sweat; Morris	Sweat; Morris	4:24

iTunes pre-order bonus track
No.	Title	Writer(s)	Producer(s)	Length
13.	"I Hurt an Angel"	Sweat; Morris	Sweat; Morris	4:23

== Personnel ==
Credits for Ridin' Solo adapted from AllMusic.

- Adam Ledgister – drum programming, engineer, keyboards, mixing, producer, synthesizer, vocal arrangement, background vocals
- Adrian Albritton – photography
- Luke Austin – producer
- Durrell Babbs – composer, vocal arrangement, background vocals
- Chuckii Booker – instrumentation, producer
- Dave Brown – composer, vocal arrangement
- Carl M. Days Jr. – background vocals
- Najja Edwards – engineer, mixing assistant
- Gasner Hughes – vocal arrangement, background vocals
- Bruce Irvine – mixing
- Billy Ray Little – composer
- Liz Loblack – marketing
- Tony Martinez – vocal arrangement, background vocals
- Harvey Mason, Jr. – mixing
- Kedar Massenburg – executive producer
- Wirlie Morris – arranger, composer, drum programming, editing, engineer, producer, strings, synthesizer
- The Platinum Brothers – producer
- Herb Powers – mastering
- Angelo Remón – composer, drum programming, engineer, producer, synthesizer, background vocals
- Jackie Rhinehart – marketing
- Steven Russell – composer, instrumentation, producer, vocal arrangement, background vocals
- Alvin Speights – mixing
- Keith Sweat – executive producer, primary artist, vocal arrangement, background vocals
- Antonine Tatum – background vocals
- Dale Voelker – art direction, design

== Charts ==
=== Weekly charts ===
Weekly chart performance for Ridin' Solo
Chart (2010)	Peak position
US Billboard 200	13
US Independent Albums (Billboard)	1
US Top R&B/Hip-Hop Albums (Billboard)	4

=== Year-end charts ===
Year-end chart performance for Ridin' Solo
Chart (2010)	Position
US Top R&B/Hip-Hop Albums (Billboard)	77

== Release history ==
Ridin' Solo release history
Region	Date	Format	Label	Ref(s)
Various	June 22, 2010	CD; digital download	Kedar Entertainment; Fontana Distribution	
