= I'll Give All My Love to You (song) =

- US commercial cassette single

Single by Keith Sweat

from the album I'll Give All My Love to You
- Released: December 4, 1990
- Genre: R&B
- Length: 5:36
- Label: Elektra
- Songwriters: Keith Sweat; Bobby Wooten
- Producers: Keith Sweat; Bobby Wooten

Keith Sweat singles chronology
"Merry Go Round" (1990)	"I'll Give All My Love To You" (1990)	"Your Love" (1991)

"I'll Give All My Love to You" is a song recorded by American singer and songwriter Keith Sweat from his studio album of the same name (1990). It was written and produced by Sweat and Bobby Wooten and released in December 1990 by Elektra Records, as the album's second single. It reached numbers seven and 18 on the US Billboard Hot 100 and Cash Box Top 100 charts, and also spent one week at number one on the Billboard R&B chart. The song also is featured as a live version on "Sweat Hotel: Live" with R&B singer Monica.

== Track listing ==
=== 12" single ===
A1. "I'll Give All My Love to You"
B1. "I'll Give All My Love to You" (Love Mix)
B2. "I Want Her" (Dance Til Ya Sweat Mix)

=== CD single ===
1. "I'll Give All My Love to You" (Edit) (4:29)
2. "I'll Give All My Love to You" (LP Version) (5:36)

== Charts ==
=== Weekly charts ===
Chart (1991)	Peak position
Australia (ARIA)	148
US Billboard Hot 100	7
US Hot R&B/Hip-Hop Songs (Billboard)	1
US Cash Box Top 100	18

=== Year-end charts ===
Chart (1991)	Position
US Billboard Hot 100	76
US Hot R&B/Hip-Hop Songs (Billboard)	19

== See also ==
- List of Hot R&B Singles number ones of 1991
