= Make You Sweat =

1990 single by Keith Sweat

Single by Keith Sweat

from the album I'll Give All My Love to You
- Released: May 24, 1990
- Genre: New jack swing
- Length: 5:15
- Label: Elektra
- Songwriters: Timmy Gatling, Keith Sweat, Bobby Wooten
- Producer: Keith Sweat

Keith Sweat singles chronology
"Don't Stop Your Love" (1989)	"Make You Sweat" (1990)	"Merry-Go-Round" (1990)

"Make You Sweat" is a song by American singer and songwriter Keith Sweat. Released in May 1990 by Elektra Records, as the lead single from his second studio album, I'll Give All My Love to You (1990), the song peaked at numbers 12 and 14 on the US Cash Box Top 100 and Billboard Hot 100 charts. It also spent one week at number one on the Billboard R&B Singles chart and number five on the Billboard Hot Dance Club Play chart. "Make You Sweat" is co-written by Sweat with Timmy Gatling and Bobby Wooten, and he also produced it.

== Track listing ==
A1. "Make You Sweat" (Edit of LP Version) (3:47)
A2. "Make You Sweat" (Extended Version) (6:02)
B1. "Make You Sweat" (Sweat Beat) (1:18)
B2. "Make You Sweat" (Club Beat) (5:07)
B3. "Make You Sweat" (Instrumental) (5:46)

== Charts ==
=== Weekly charts ===
Chart (1990)	Peak position
Netherlands (Single Top 100)	86
US Billboard Hot 100	14
US Hot R&B/Hip-Hop Songs (Billboard)	1
US Hot Dance Club Play (Billboard)	5
US Cash Box Top 100	12

=== Year-end charts ===
Chart (1990)	Position
US Billboard Hot 100	89

== Certifications ==
Region	Certification	Certified units/sales
United States (RIAA)	Gold	500,000^{^}
^{^} Shipments figures based on certification alone.

== See also ==
- List of Hot R&B Singles number ones of 1990
