= Come and Get with Me =

Single by Keith Sweat featuring Snoop Dogg

from the album Still in the Game
- Released: October 6, 1998
- Recorded: 1998
- Genre: Hip hop, R&B
- Length: 4:55
- Label: Elektra
- Songwriters: Keith Sweat, Calvin Broadus, Curtis Jefferson
- Producers: Keith Sweat, Lee "Wiz" McCallum

Keith Sweat singles chronology
"Come with Me" (1997)	"Come and Get with Me" (1998)	"I'm Not Ready" (1999)

Snoop Dogg singles chronology
"Still a G Thang" (1998)	"Come and Get with Me" (1998)	"Woof" (1998)

"Come and Get with Me" is the lead single from Keith Sweat's sixth studio album, Still in the Game. The song was produced by Keith Sweat himself and featured two rapped verses from Snoop Dogg.

The song became Sweat's seventh top-40 single on the Billboard Hot 100, peaking at No. 12 on the chart. It also became his fifth and final single to earn a gold certification for sales of 500,000 copies, accomplishing the feat on November 9, 1998. The official remix was produced by Clark Kent and featured Noreaga in place of Snoop Dogg.

== Track listing ==
1. "Come and Get with Me" (Radio Edit)- 4:09
2. "Come and Get with Me" (Radio Version)- 4:55
3. "Come Get and with Me" (Clarksworld Remix)-

== Charts ==
=== Weekly charts ===
Weekly chart performance for "Come and Get with Me"
Chart (1998)	Peak position
Australia (ARIA)	74
Germany (Jam FM Charts)	1
New Zealand (Recorded Music NZ)	16
UK Singles Chart	58
US Billboard Hot 100	12
US Hot R&B/Hip-Hop Songs (Billboard)	6
US Rhythmic Airplay (Billboard)	16

=== Year-end charts ===
Year-end chart performance for "Come and Get with Me"
Chart (1998)	Position
US Billboard Hot R&B/Hip-Hop Singles & Tracks	97

== Certifications ==
Certifications for "Come and Get with Me"
Region	Certification	Certified units/sales
United States (RIAA)	Gold	500,000^{^}
^{^} Shipments figures based on certification alone.
