= I Like (Kut Klose song) =

1995 single by Kut Klose

Single by Kut Klose

from the album Surrender
- B-side: "Lay My Body Down", "Like You've Never Been Done (Get Up on It Remix)"
- Released: February 7, 1995
- Recorded: 1994
- Genre: R&B
- Length: 4:18
- Label: Elektra
- Songwriters: Tabitha Duncan; Donald Parks; Emanuel Officer; John Howcott
- Producers: Donald Parks; Emanuel Officer; John Howcott

Kut Klose singles chronology
"Get Up on It" (1994)	"I Like" (1995)	"Lovely Thang" (1995)

Music video
- "I Like" on YouTube

"I Like" is a song performed by American R&B group Kut Klose, issued in 1994 by Elektra Records, as the first single from their debut and only studio album, Surrender (1995). It is co-written by group member Tabitha Duncan, and produced by Donald Parks, Emanuel Officer and John Howcott. The song was their only hit on both the US Cash Box Top 100 and Billboard Hot 100 charts, peaking at No. 27 and 34 in May 1995.

== Charts ==
=== Weekly charts ===
Chart (1995)	Peak position
US Billboard Hot 100	34
US Hot R&B/Hip-Hop Songs (Billboard)	6
US Rhythmic (Billboard)	25
US Cash Box Top 100	27

=== Year-end charts ===
Chart (1995)	Position
US Hot R&B/Hip-Hop Songs (Billboard)	28
