= A Christmas of Love =

Studio album by Keith Sweat
- Released: November 20, 2007
- Length: 36:13
- Labels: Sweat Shop; Rhino
- Producers: Wirlie Morris; Keith Sweat

Keith Sweat chronology
| Sweat Hotel Live (2007) | A Christmas of Love (2007) | Just Me (2008) |

A Christmas of Love is the ninth studio album by American singer Keith Sweat. Released by Sweat Shop Records and Rhino records on November 20, 2007, it was his first Christmas album.

== Critical reception ==
Professional ratings
Review scores
| Source | Rating |
|---|---|
| About.com | 2.5/5 stars |

AllMusic found that "Sweat knows something about contemporary R&B, and his smooth loverman sound, with just a touch of light hip-hop flavor, is all over Christmas of Love [...] With the exception of "The Christmas Song," Sweat steers clear of traditional material, opting instead for narratives of romantic love placed in a holiday context such as "Be Your Santa Claus" and "Under the Tree." Sweat's singing sounds as good as it did in the '80s, and this disc should provide a soundtrack for lovers looking to generate a Yuletide spark." Herald & Review remarked that "tracks such as “Party Christmas” and “Be Your Santa Claus” create the impression that Christmas is just one more occasion for a boudoir workout."

== Track listing ==
A Christmas of Love track listing
| No. | Title | Writer(s) | Producer(s) | Length |
|---|---|---|---|---|
| 1. | "Be Your Santa Claus" | Carl M. Days, Jr.; Dennis Bettis; Wirlie Morris | W. Morris | 4:15 |
| 2. | "Party Christmas" | Days; Bettis; W. Morris | W. Morris | 3:55 |
| 3. | "It's Christmas Again" | Sweat; David Brown | Sweat | 3:36 |
| 4. | "The Christmas Song" | Mel Tormé; Robert Wells | W. Morris | 3:47 |
| 5. | "All I Want for Christmas" | Sweat; L. Dunston | W. Morris | 3:55 |
| 6. | "Once a Year" | Sweat; Avana Bush; C. Conner; Dunston; N. Ingram | W. Morris | 3:33 |
| 7. | "Nothing like Christmas" | Days; Bettis; W. Morris | W. Morris | 4:02 |
| 8. | "Point of Christmas" | Days; Bettis; Valencia Morris; W. Morris | W. Morris | 4:08 |
| 9. | "Under the Tree" | Sweat; Raymond Ledgister | W. Morris | 5:07 |
| Total length: | | | | 36:13 |

== Charts ==
Chart performance for A Christmas of Love
| Chart (2007) | Peak position |
|---|---|
| US Top R&B/Hip-Hop Albums (Billboard) | 85 |

== Release history ==
Release history for A Christmas of Love
| Region | Date | Format(s) | Label | Ref. |
|---|---|---|---|---|
| United States | November 20, 2007 | CD; digital download | Sweat Shop; Rhino | |
