= I'll Give All My Love to You =

Studio album by Keith Sweat
- Released: June 12, 1990
- Recorded: 1989–1990
- Studios: Unique Recording Studios, New York City
- Genre: New jack swing
- Length: 50:56
- Labels: Vintertainment; Elektra
- Producers: Teddy Riley; Keith Sweat; Bobby Wooten

Keith Sweat chronology
Make It Last Forever (1987)	I'll Give All My Love to You (1990)	Keep It Comin' (1991)

Singles from I'll Give All My Love to You
- 1. "Make You Sweat" Released: May 24, 1990; 2. "Merry Go Round" Released: August 23, 1990; 3. "I'll Give All My Love to You" Released: December 4, 1990; 4. "Your Love, Pt. 2" Released: April 1991

I'll Give All My Love to You is the second studio album by the American R&B recording artist Keith Sweat. It was released on June 12, 1990, and went to number one on the Top R&B albums chart and number 6 on the Billboard 200. It spawned Sweat's second and third number 1 R&B hits: "Make You Sweat" and the title track (both Top 20 pop hits), while "Merry Go Round" and "Your Love Part 2" were Top 5 R&B hits.

This was the last Keith Sweat album under Vincent Davis' Vintertainment label, which severed ties with Elektra soon after the release of this album. On March 7, 1991, I'll Give All My Love to You was certified double platinum by the RIAA, for shipments of two million copies in the United States. The single "Make You Sweat" was certified gold by the RIAA on October 4, 1990, for shipments of 500,000 copies in the United States.

== Critical reception ==
Professional ratings
Review scores
Source	Rating
AllMusic	4.5/5 stars
Robert Christgau	(dud)
Entertainment Weekly	C+
Los Angeles Times	2/5 stars
Rolling Stone	3.5/5 stars

In a review upon the album's release, Rolling Stone gave it three-and-a-half out of five stars and commented that "this album discusses love, lost, found and reclaimed, and lust over grinding, pounding synth grooves". In his consumer guide for The Village Voice, the critic Robert Christgau gave the album a "dud" rating, indicating "a bad record whose details rarely merit further thought". The Los Angeles Times writer Connie Johnson wrote, "Sweat's debut album 'Make It Last Forever' caught fire largely because of producer Teddy Riley, and his absence is strongly felt on this Sweat-produced follow-up". Greg Sandow of Entertainment Weekly complimented Sweat's vocals and singing style, but wrote that "despite all this passion, there's no obvious pop hit on the record [...] Most of the tracks sound interchangeably slow and steamy". In a retrospective review, Allmusic editor Alex Henderson called the album "a respectable disc that sounds consistently heartfelt and sincere", writing that "For all its high-tech production gloss and use of hip-hop elements, this self-produced CD reminds you that Sweat is quite aware of the great soul music of the 1970s".

== Track listing ==
I'll Give All My Love to You track listing
No.	Title	Writer(s)	Length
1.	"Interlude (I'll Give All My Love to You)"	Keith Sweat; Bobby Wooten	0:53
2.	"Make You Sweat"	Timmy Gatling; Keith Sweat; Bobby Wooten	5:15
3.	"Come Back"	Keith Sweat; Bobby Wooten	4:39
4.	"Merry Go Round"	Bobby Douglas; Keith Sweat	7:29
5.	"Your Love"	Keith Sweat; Bobby Wooten	5:53
6.	"Your Love, Pt. 2"	Keith Sweat	5:51
7.	"Just One of Them Thangs" (featuring Gerald Levert)	Keith Sweat	6:12
8.	"I Knew That You Were Cheatin'"	Keith Sweat; Bobby Wooten	4:18
9.	"Love to Love You"	Keith Sweat; Bobby Wooten	4:50
10.	"I'll Give All My Love to You"	Keith Sweat; Bobby Wooten	5:36

== Personnel ==
Credits adapted from AllMusic.

- Keith Sweat – lead vocals, background vocals, keyboards (tracks 5 and 6), producer, mixing
- Teddy Riley – keyboards, producer, drum programming, mixing
- Jacci McGhee – vocals (track 8), background vocals
- Gerald Levert – performer
- John Adams – keyboards
- Thor Baldursson – keyboards, saxophone, drum programming
- Charles "Poogie" Bell, Jr. – drum programming
- Bobby Douglas – keyboards
- Bobby Wooten – keyboards, producer, engineer, mixing

== Charts ==
=== Weekly charts ===
Weekly chart performance for I'll Give All My Love to You
Chart (1990)	Peak position
Dutch Albums (Album Top 100)	54
UK Albums (Official Charts)	47
US Billboard 200	6
US Top R&B/Hip-Hop Albums (Billboard)	1

=== Year-end charts ===
Year-end chart performance for I'll Give All My Love to You
Chart (1990)	Position
US Billboard 200	47
US Top R&B/Hip-Hop Albums (Billboard)	20
Chart (1991)	Position
US Billboard 200	86
US Top R&B/Hip-Hop Albums (Billboard)	11

== Certifications ==
Certifications for I'll Give All My Love to You
Region	Certification	Certified units/sales
United States (RIAA)	2× Platinum	2,000,000^{^}
^{^} Shipments figures based on certification alone.

== See also ==
- List of number-one R&B albums of 1990 (U.S.)
