= Get Up on It =

Studio album by Keith Sweat
- Released: June 28, 1994
- Genre: New jack swing
- Length: 54:17
- Label: Elektra
- Producers: Joe Jefferson; Eric McCaine; Fitzgerald Scott; Keith Sweat

Keith Sweat chronology
Keep It Comin' (1991)	Get Up on It (1994)	Keith Sweat (1996)

Singles from Get Up On It
- 1. "How Do You Like It?" Released: March 28, 1994; 2. "When I Give My Love" Released: 1994; 3. "Get Up on It" Released: 1994

Professional ratings
Review scores
Source	Rating
AllMusic	3/5 stars
Entertainment Weekly	B+
Los Angeles Times	2/4 stars

Get Up On It is the fourth studio album by the American R&B recording artist Keith Sweat. It was released by Elektra Records on June 28, 1994, in the United States and went to number one on the Billboard Top R&B/Hip-Hop Albums chart for two weeks, while also reaching number eight on the Billboard 200 chart.

Singles from the album include "How Do You Like It?", "When I Give My Love" and the title track. The album features collaborations from the late Left Eye of TLC, Roger Troutman of Zapp and up and coming group Kut Klose, which features Athena Cage. On December 6, 1994, Get Up on It was certified platinum by the Recording Industry Association of America, for shipments of one million copies in the United States.

== Track listing ==
Get Up on It track listing
No.	Title	Writer(s)	Producer(s)	Length
1.	"How Do You Like It?" (Interlude)	Keith Sweat; Fitzgerald Scott; Joe Jefferson	Sweat; Scott	0:30
2.	"How Do You Like It?" (featuring Lisa "Left Eye" Lopes)	Sweat; Scott; Jefferson; Lopes	Sweat	4:33
3.	"It Gets Better"	Sweat; Jerry Flowers	Sweat	3:44
4.	"Get Up on It" (featuring Kut Klose)	Sweat; Scott	Sweat; Scott	5:06
5.	"Feels So Good"	Sweat; Eric McCaine	Sweat; McCaine	3:53
6.	"How Do You Like It? (Pt. II)"	Sweat; Scott; Jefferson; Lopes	Sweat; Scott	4:14
7.	"Intermission Break"	Sweat; Scott	Sweat	1:24
8.	"My Whole World"	Sweat; McCaine	Sweat; McCaine	3:37
9.	"Grind on You"	Sweat; Anthony Leach; William Ward	Sweat	5:05
10.	"When I Give My Love"	Sweat; Scott; Jefferson	Sweat; Scott; Jefferson	6:05
11.	"Put Your Lovin' Through the Test" (featuring Roger Troutman)	Sweat; Flowers	Sweat	4:34
12.	"Telephone Love"	Sweat	Sweat	0:56
13.	"Come Into My Bedroom"	Sweat; Flowers	Sweat	5:25
14.	"For You (You Got Everything)"	Sweat; Flowers	Sweat	5:06

== Personnel ==
- Keith Sweat – main performer, producer, writer, executive producer
- Jerry Flowers – producer, writer
- Eric McCaine – producer, writer
- Lisa Lopes – writer, guest performer
- Kut Klose – performer
- Fitzgerald Scott – producer, writer
- Roger Troutman – guest performer
- William Ward (Billybad) – producer, writer
- Joe Jefferson – producer, writer
- Anthony Leach – producer, writer
- Karl Heilbron – engineer, mixer

== Charts ==
=== Weekly charts ===
Weekly chart performance for Get Up on It
Chart (1994)	Peak position
Australian Albums (ARIA)	111
Dutch Albums (Album Top 100)	28
German Albums (Offizielle Top 100)	86
Swedish Albums (Sverigetopplistan)	46
UK Albums (Official Charts)	20
UK R&B Albums (Official Charts)	18
US Billboard 200	8
US Top R&B/Hip-Hop Albums (Billboard)	1

=== Year-end charts ===
Year-end chart performance for Get Up on It
Chart (1994)	Position
US Top R&B/Hip-Hop Albums (Billboard)	25

== Certifications ==
Certifications for Get Up on It
Region	Certification	Certified units/sales
United States (RIAA)	Platinum	1,000,000^{^}
^{^} Shipments figures based on certification alone.

== See also ==
- List of number-one R&B albums of 1994 (U.S.)
