= I'm Not Ready (Keith Sweat song) =

1999 single by Keith Sweat

Single by Keith Sweat

from the album Still in the Game
- Released: February 23, 1999
- Length: 4:17
- Label: Elektra
- Songwriter(s): Keith Sweat; Joe Little III; Willie Jones
- Producer(s): Sweat

Keith Sweat singles chronology
"Come and Get with Me" (1998)	"I'm Not Ready" (1999)	"I'll Trade (A Million Bucks)" (2000)

Music video
- "I'm Not Ready" on YouTube

"I'm Not Ready" is a song by American singer Keith Sweat and the second single from his sixth studio album Still in the Game (1998). It peaked at number 16 on the Billboard Hot 100, his last song to chart there.

== Charts ==
Chart (1999)	Peak position
New Zealand (Recorded Music NZ)	45
UK Singles (OCC)	53
US Billboard Hot 100	16
US Hot R&B/Hip-Hop Songs (Billboard)	12
