= Rebirth (Keith Sweat album) =

Studio album by Keith Sweat
- Released: August 13, 2002
- Length: 65:21
- Label: Elektra
- Producers: Keith Sweat; Roy "Royalty" Hamilton

Keith Sweat chronology
Didn't See Me Coming (2000)	Rebirth (2002)	Keith Sweat Live (2003)

Rebirth is the eighth studio album by American singer Keith Sweat. It was released by Elektra Records on August 13, 2002 in the United States.

== Critical reception ==
Professional ratings
Review scores
Source	Rating
AllMusic	3/5 stars
The Herald-Standard	2.5/5 stars
Vibe	3.5/5 stars

Allmusic editor John Bush found that "it's not really a creative reawakening since he hasn't changed anything about his game. In the end, Rebirth is really just another Keith Sweat album, and it's a tribute to one of the leading soul men of the '80s and '90s that he can continue making records as smooth and as vigorous as this one 15 years down the road [...] Sweat is still in great voice, and it's his personality that carries Rebirth, even when it sounds similar to his work in the past."

Vibe's Jason King felt that Rebirth "probably won’t win Sweat any new fans, but he certainly won’t lose any. Despite a reliance on talk boxes and synth strings, and predictable references to two-ways and the number 69, the album has few missteps." Chuck Campbell from The Herald-Standard wrote: "There's longevity, and there’s quality of life. While it is remarkable that Keith Sweat is still plugging away a decade and a half after he helped instigate the new jack swing movement in urban pop, his Rebirth is far short of a miracle.Sweat offers enough material on his eighth release to prop up his career, but his generic sound isn’t buzzworthy. Instead, Rebirth is partly a tame dance disc, partly a lame indulgence in romance."

== Chart performance ==
Rebirth debuted and peaked at number 14 on the US Billboard 200 and number seven on the US Top R&B/Hip-Hop Albums chart, selling 58,000 copies in its first week. By January 2003, the album had sold 222,000 copies domestically, according to Nielsen SoundScan.

== Track listing ==
Rebirth track listing
No.	Title	Writer(s)	Producer(s)	Length
1.	"I Want You" (featuring Royalty & Nasdaq)	Keith Sweat; Fitzgerald Scott; Daniel Jackson; Duane Covert; Kevin R. Cannon	Sweat; Scott	4:10
2.	"Gots to Have It" (featuring Ron-Ron & Royalty)	Roy "Royalty" Hamilton; Raphael Hamilton; Ronald Linton	Raphael Hamilton	3:32
3.	"Anything Goes"	Sweat; Roy Hamilton; Raphael Hamilton; Linton	Hamilton	3:38
4.	"Ladies Night"	Sweat; Roy Hamilton; Raphael Hamilton; Linton; Earnest E. Dixon	Hamilton	3:51
5.	"100% All Man"	Roy Hamilton; Raphael Hamilton	Hamilton	3:35
6.	"The Right Stuff"	Roy Hamilton; Raphael Hamilton; Linton	Hamilton	4:08
7.	"One On One" (featuring Lola Troy & Lade Bac)	Al E. Cat; David Winfree	Cat	4:58
8.	"Show Me"	Sweat; Scott; Jackson; Covert; Cannon	Sweat; Scott	4:38
9.	"Trust Me"	Scott; Adonis Shropshire	Sweat; Chanz	4:32
10.	"Wonderful Thang"	Sweat; Marvin "Chanz" Parkman	Sweat; Chanz	4:29
11.	"In and Out"	Sweat; Dee Dee Jenkins; W. Wells	Sweat; Jenkins	4:55
12.	"Can It Be" (featuring Doni)	Sweat; Clarence Kage Holme	Sweat; Holmes; Boris Montague	6:10
13.	"What Is It?"	Roy Hamilton; Raphael Hamilton	Hamilton	4:15
14.	"Untitled" (live)	Sweat		3:17
15.	"Twisted" (live)	Lavonn Battle; Athena Cage; Tabitha Duncan; Eric McCaine; Sweat		5:18

== Personnel ==
- Keith Sweat – vocals, producer, executive producer, vocal arrangement
- Fitzgerald Scott – keyboards, background vocals, producer, drum programming
- Roy "Royalty" Hamilton – background vocals, producer, executive producer
- Merlin Bobb – executive producer, Associate executive producer
- Chanz – keyboards, background vocals, producer, drum programming
- Al E. Cat – keyboards, background vocals, drum programming
- Lade Bac – vocals, background vocals
- Winfree – Talkbox
- Se7en – Guitar, keyboards, drum programming
- Clarence "Kage" Holmes – producer, drum programming
- Zack Odom – recording engineer

== Charts ==
Chart performance for Rebirth
Chart (2002)	Peak position
French Albums (SNEP)	77
Dutch Albums (Album Top 100)	88
German Albums (Offizielle Top 100)	69
UK R&B Albums (Official Charts)	26
US Billboard 200	14
US Top R&B/Hip-Hop Albums (Billboard)	7
