= Make It Last Forever (album) =

1987 studio album by Keith Sweat

Studio album by Keith Sweat
- Released: November 24, 1987
- Recorded: 1987
- Studios: INS Recording, Power Play Studios; New York City
- Genre: New jack swing
- Length: 43:15
- Labels: Vintertainment; Elektra
- Producers: Keith Sweat; Teddy Riley

Keith Sweat chronology
Make It Last Forever (1987)	I'll Give All My Love to You (1990)

Singles from Make It Last Forever
- 1. "I Want Her" Released: September 21, 1987; 2. "Something Just Ain’t Right" Released: January 9, 1988; 3. "Make It Last Forever" Released: April 25, 1988; 4. "Don't Stop Your Love" Released: 1988

Make It Last Forever is the debut album by American R&B recording artist Keith Sweat. Released on November 24, 1987, the album went to number one on the Top R&B Albums chart for three weeks (and topped the Billboard Year-End R&B chart for 1988), and number 15 on the Billboard 200. Make It Last Forever was one of the earliest R&B albums to showcase the up-and-coming new jack swing sound, as it was mostly produced by Sweat himself and music producer Teddy Riley. It was recorded at INS Recording and Power Play Studios in New York City.

The album's biggest hit was "I Want Her", a number-five hit on the Billboard Hot 100 and the first number-one R&B hit for Sweat. The title track (a duet with Jacci McGhee) followed "I Want Her", making the number two R&B spot, while "Don't Stop Your Love" and "Something Just Ain't Right" were also major top ten hits on the Billboard R&B charts. In addition, album tracks such as "Right and a Wrong Way" and "How Deep Is Your Love" received substantial radio airplay and can still be heard on quiet storm format stations. On April 6, 1994, Make It Last Forever was certified triple platinum by the Recording Industry Association of America, for shipments of three million copies in the United States. The single "I Want Her" was certified gold by the RIAA on June 13, 1989, for shipments of 500,000 copies in the US.

== Background ==
Sweat and Riley originally met each other while performing in different bands. Riley was the keyboard player in a band called Total Climax, while Sweat was the lead singer of Jamilah. The two acts were competing against each other in the Big Apple band tournament where Total Climax defeated Jamilah. From that day on, the two spoke to each other in passing, although neither of them knew each other. Sweat later came to Riley's block looking for him to work on music together. When Sweat approached him, he found Riley on the street playing dice with a few of his friends. Sweat then proceeded to get in on the game to gamble and won everyone's money except for Riley. Sweat then asked Riley to work with him due to his past work with acts like Kool Moe Dee and The Classical Two. However, Riley declined the offer because he didn't do R&B music. Sweat then persuaded Riley to work together on some songs to see what will become of them. At the time that Sweat had summoned his talents, Riley had originally been asked by Al B. Sure! to oversee the sessions for Sure!'s debut album In Effect Mode.

== Recording ==
As Sweat and Riley began to work together, the music to "I Want Her" and "Make It Last Forever" had been made prior to them meeting each other. Riley described the recording process as organic, as he had no plans to do R&B music. As the two worked on the melodies and arrangements, Riley contributed the primary background vocals to "I Want Her". Riley also asked Sweat to sing in a nasal tone to have a distinctive sound for him. Sweat objected to that decision and walked out of the room before recording the song. Although Sweat refused to record the song with the nasal voice, Riley convinced him that it would work for him, which made Sweat come around to recording the song.

"Something Just Ain't Right" was worked on at Riley's house and was inspired by something going on in Sweat's life with his then-girlfriend. According to Riley, the songs "Make It Last Forever" and "How Deep Is Your Love" were recorded with Sweat singing the lyrics off the top of his head. Musicians such as Fred McFarlane and GQ member Emmanuel Rahiem LeBlanc also contributed in various forms. However, on "Right and a Wrong Way", Riley had to perform a saxophone solo on the keyboard because he wasn't able to find someone who could play the saxophone.

Riley described Sweat as an "over-perfectionist" who would record the songs "again and again until he gets it the way he likes it". It took six months to record Make It Last Forever, to which they recorded 16 or 17 songs, but only eight of them made the final track listing. One of the songs that didn't make the album was "Just Got Paid". Sweat passed on it, which Riley later gave to Johnny Kemp for his 1988 album Secrets of Flying.

== Critical reception ==
Professional ratings
Review scores
Source	Rating
AllMusic	5/5 stars
Robert Christgau	B

J.D. Considine of Musician stated in a review upon the album's release, "Though Keith Sweat is B-Boy enough to relish the cheap-drum-machine clatter of the classic hip-hop groove, he's also sufficiently soulful to keep that from crowding his vocal style". Robert Christgau of The Village Voice gave Make It Last Forever a "B". Christgau commented that "the beats prove Teddy Riley New York's answer to Jam & Lewis" and stated, "For credentials the next big love man proffers beats on the slow ones and lyrics whose seduction strategy is never to offend". In a retrospective review, AllMusic editor Andrew Hamilton viewed it as Sweat's best album. He complimented his "pleading, whining tenor" and wrote that it "adroitly draws you into every song, demanding an emotional commitment".

== Track listing ==
All tracks are written by Keith Sweat and Teddy Riley, except where noted.

Make It Last Forever track listing
No.	Title	Music	Length
1.	"Something Just Ain't Right"		5:22
2.	"Right and A Wrong Way"		5:17
3.	"Tell Me It's Me You Want"		4:50
4.	"I Want Her"		6:00
5.	"Make It Last Forever" (featuring Jacci McGhee)		4:55
6.	"In the Rain"	Tony Hester	5:47
7.	"How Deep Is Your Love?"		4:51
8.	"Don't Stop Your Love"	Sweat	6:13
Total length:			43:15

== Personnel ==
Credits adapted from the liner notes.

- Keith Sweat – main performer, producer
- Teddy Riley – producer, keyboards, drum programming
- Fred McFarlane – keyboards
- Jeff Neiblum – recording engineer, percussion
- Clifford Branch – keyboards, background vocals
- George Heylinger – background vocals
- Emmanuel Rahiem LeBlanc – background vocals
- Jacci McGhee – background vocals
- Vivian Sessoms – background vocals
- Tammy Lucas – background vocals
- Dave Dachinger – mixing engineer
- Herb Powers, Jr. – mastering

== Charts ==
=== Weekly charts ===
Weekly chart performance for Make It Last Forever
Chart (1987)	Peak position
New Zealand Albums (RMNZ)	46
UK Albums (Official Charts)	41
US Billboard 200	15
US Top R&B/Hip-Hop Albums (Billboard)	1

=== Year-end charts ===
Year-end chart performance for Make It Last Forever
Chart (1988)	Position
US Billboard 200	22
US Top R&B/Hip-Hop Albums (Billboard)	1
Chart (1989)	Position
US Top R&B/Hip-Hop Albums (Billboard)	41

== Certifications ==
Certifications for Make It Last Forever
Region	Certification	Certified units/sales
United Kingdom (BPI)	Silver	60,000^{^}
United States (RIAA)	3× Platinum	3,000,000^{^}
^{^} Shipments figures based on certification alone.

== See also ==
- Billboard Year-End
- List of number-one R&B albums of 1988 (U.S.)
