= Still in the Game =

Studio album by Keith Sweat
- Released: September 22, 1998
- Studios: The Sweat Shop (Atlanta, Georgia); A&M (Los Angeles, California); Battery (New York City); On The Way (Cleveland, Ohio)
- Length: 51:26
- Label: Elektra
- Producers: Darryl Adams; Big Baby; Bobby Crawford; Kevin "KJ" Johnson; Joe Little III; Jay Mack; Lee "Wiz" McCallum; Suga Mike; Keith Sweat

Keith Sweat chronology
Keith Sweat (1996)	Still in the Game (1998)	Didn't See Me Coming (2000)

Singles from Still in the Game
- 1. "Come and Get with Me" Released: October 6, 1998; 2. "I'm Not Ready" Released: February 23, 1999

Still in the Game is the sixth studio album by American singer Keith Sweat. It was released by Elektra Records on September 22, 1998, in the United States. The title of the album refers to Sweat being in the music business for over a decade. It was certified Platinum by the Recording Industry Association of America (RIAA) on October 14, 1998. The single "Come and Get with Me" peaked at number 12 in the US. Follow-up "I'm Not Ready", released that same year, peaked at number 16.

== Critical reception ==
Professional ratings
Review scores
Source	Rating
AllMusic	2.5/5 stars
Entertainment Weekly	B+
Los Angeles Times	2/4 stars

Allmusic editor Michael Gallucci wrote that on Still in the Game, "Sweat goes one-on-one with his audience, playing into their hearts and souls with his typically smooth-croon grandeur. It all sounds a bit familiar (as well as a bit programmed) – and the Jermaine Dupri, Erick Sermon and Too Short cameos add absolutely nothing to Sweat's sweet mix – but there's a cool sexuality in his grooves and moves." Paul Verna from Billboard felt that Still in the Game "makes it clear that he hasn't deviated from the singing style that made him a household name. However, this sets [...] should expose the vocalst to a younger and more streetwise audience and enhance his sales prospects."

Matt Diehl from Entertainment Weekly found that "despite his new album’s defensive title, Still in the Game, Keith Sweat shouldn't worry — his long-running career proves he's an R&B lover-man for the ages. Cameos from Snoop Dogg, Too Short, and Erick Sermon feel superfluous: Sweat’s seductive burr of a voice is all he needs — when he lolls around the line "come into my bedroom" like molasses on the tongue, it's pure Spanish fly soul. Keep a copy of this in the boudoir." Los Angeles Times critic Connie Johnson wrote that Still in the Game shows that "when Sweat really is at the top of his game, he cranks out club-friendly jams," but here "he isn’t fresh enough," noting that while Snoop Dogg adds "some bite to "Come and Get With Me"," overall it is "a competent effort but not one to make him the Michael Jordan of R&B."

== Commercial performance ==
Still in the Game debuted and peaked at number six on the US Billboard 200 and number two on the Top R&B/Hip-Hop Albums chart in the week of October 10, 1998, with first week sales of 96,000 copies. On October 14, 1998, it was certified Gold and Platinum by the Recording Industry Association of America (RIAA) for shipments figure in excess of 1 million copies.

== Track listing ==
Still in the Game track listing
No.	Title	Writer(s)	Producer(s)	Length
1.	"Come and Get with Me" (featuring Snoop Dogg)	Keith Sweat; Calvin Broadus; Lee "Wiz" McCallum	Sweat; Wiz	4:57
2.	"Rumors"	David McPherson; Sweat; Tonyatta Martinez	Sweat	3:44
3.	"Can We Make Love"	Bobby Crawford; Curtis Jefferson; Sweat	Sweat; Crawford	4:08
4.	"Let Me Have My Way"	Sweat; McCallum	Sweat; Wiz	3:49
5.	"What Goes Around"	Darryl Adams; Sweat	Sweat; Adams	4:48
6.	"Love Jones" (featuring Playa, Too $hort and Erick Sermon)	Sermon; Gregory Taylor; Todd Shaw; Sweat	Sweat; Jay Mack	4:27
7.	"Too Hot" (featuring Free and Jermaine Dupri)	Charles Smith; Curtis Williams; Dennis "D.T." Thomas; George "Funky" Brown; James "J.T." Taylor; Robert Bell; Robert Mickens; Ronald Bell; Richard Westfield; Jermaine Dupri; Marie Wright	Sweat; Wiz	4:10
8.	"I'm Not Ready"	Joe Little III; Sweat; Willie Jones	Sweat; Little	4:17
9.	"Show U What Love Is" (featuring Ol Skool)	Jefferson; Kevin "KJ" Johnson; Sweat	Sweat; Johnson	3:49
10.	"Just Another Day"	Gerald Levert; Little; Sweat	Sweat; Little	4:22
11.	"You Know I Like"	Sweat; McCallum	Sweat; Wiz	3:43
12.	"In Your Eyes"	Big Baby; Sweat; Kenny Greene	Sweat; Big Baby; Suga Mike	5:13

Bonus track
No.	Title	Writer(s)	Producer(s)	Length
13.	"Come and Get with Me (Clarkworld Remix)" (featuring Noreaga)	Sweat; Victor Santiago, Jr.; McCallum	Sweat; Wiz	4:57

== Personnel ==
- Keith Sweat – background vocals, producer, executive producer
- Darryl Adams – drums, keyboards, background vocals, producer
- Big Baby & Suga Mike – producer, keyboards, programming
- Jermaine Dupri – vocals
- Free – vocals
- Curtis Jefferson – backing vocals
- Allen "Grip" Smith – keyboards
- Bobby Crawford – sequencing, programming
- Eugene Peoples – additional Keyboards, acoustic guitar
- Jay Mack – keyboards, sequencing, programming
- Erick Sermon – vocals
- Snoop Dogg – vocals
- Taj Mahal – engineer
- Too Short – vocals
- Nicarlo Williams – background vocals
- Val Young – background vocals
- Joe N Little III – writer, producer and background vocals
- Karl Heilbron – bass, recording engineer, mixing
- Steve Crooms, Ivan Walker – recording engineer
- Neal H. Pogue – mixing
- Kevin "KD" Davis – mixing
- Herb Powers – mastering

== Charts ==
=== Weekly charts ===
Weekly chart performance for Still in the Game
Chart (1998)	Peak position
Australian Albums (ARIA)	64
Dutch Albums (Album Top 100)	19
French Albums (SNEP)	49
German Albums (Offizielle Top 100)	63
UK Albums (Official Charts)	62
UK R&B Albums (Official Charts)	6
US Billboard 200	6
US Top R&B/Hip-Hop Albums (Billboard)	2

=== Year-end charts ===
1998 year-end chart performance for Still in the Game
Chart (1998)	Position
US Billboard 200	190
US Top R&B/Hip-Hop Albums (Billboard)	87

1999 year-end chart performance for Still in the Game
Chart (1999)	Position
US Top R&B/Hip-Hop Albums (Billboard)	85

== Certifications ==
Certifications for Still in the Game
Region	Certification	Certified units/sales
United States (RIAA)	Platinum	1,000,000^{^}
^{^} Shipments figures based on certification alone.
