= Get Up on It (song) =

1994 single by Keith Sweat featuring Kut Klose

Single by Keith Sweat featuring Kut Klose

from the album Get Up on It and Surrender
- Released: 1994
- Length: 5:06
- Label: Elektra
- Songwriters: Keith Sweat; Fitzgerald Scott
- Producers: Keith Sweat; Fitzgerald Scott

Keith Sweat singles chronology
"When I Give My Love" (1994)	"Get Up on It" (1994)	"Twisted" (1996)

Kut Klose singles chronology
"Get Up on It" (1994)	"I Like" (1995)

Music video
- "Get Up on It" on YouTube

"Get Up on It" is a song by American singer and songwriter Keith Sweat featuring American R&B trio Kut Klose, and released in 1994 by Elektra Records as the third single from Sweat's studio album by the same name (1994). It was written and produced by Sweat with Fitzgerald Scott and also included on Kut Klose's only studio album, Surrender (1995). The song peaked at numbers 62 and 73 on the US Billboard Hot 100 and Cash Box Top 100 charts.

== Critical reception ==
Jose F. Promis of AllMusic noted the song as an example of when Keith Sweat "began to utilize female background vocals" "to full effect" on the Get Up on It album, and considered it one of the album's "shining moments". Ralph Tee from the Record Mirror Dance Update named it "the most smouldering, midpaced urban ballad of them all right now" and a "grinding big beat driven monster". He added, "While Keith's rather unique nasal whine and his female accompanists hit the spot vocally, the mood is enhanced by the most intense and sultry keyboards and programmed effects, all topped off by a thunderously deep and dark bass line. Massive!"

== Charts ==
Chart (1994–1995)	Peak position
UK Singles (Official Charts)	83
US Billboard Hot 100	62
US Hot R&B/Hip-Hop Songs (Billboard)	12
US Maxi-Singles Sales (Billboard)	33
US Cash Box Top 100	73
