= Kut Klose =

American contemporary R&B group

- Origin: Atlanta, Georgia, U.S.
- Genres: R&B
- Years active: 1993–present
- Label: Elektra (1994–1996)
- Members: Athena Cage; Lavonn Battle; Tabitha Duncan

Kut Klose is an American R&B trio that formed in Atlanta, Georgia. The three female singers that made up the group were Athena Cage, Lavonn Battle and Tabitha Duncan. They were originally discovered by singer Keith Sweat, who also served as one of the producers on their debut album Surrender (1995). The trio is best known for their hit single "I Like" and features on "Get Up on It" and "Twisted" by Keith Sweat.

== Career ==
In 1995, Kut Klose released its debut album, Surrender. Despite releasing three singles, "Surrender," "Lovely Thang," and "I Like", the only one to make a significant impact was "I Like", which peaked at No. 6 on the US Hot R&B/Hip-Hop Songs chart and No. 34 on the Billboard Billboard Hot 100. The album peaked at No. 12 on the Billboard Top R&B/Hip-Hop Albums chart.

The women collaborated with Keith Sweat on his 1996 single "Twisted", and Cage was featured on his 1996 single "Nobody". In 2007, the group performed with Sweat for his Sweat Hotel Live project.

In September 2010, a new song, "Let It Ring", was released by the trio as a buzz single via iTunes in anticipation of an untitled second album.

== Discography ==
=== Albums ===
Year	Title	Chart positions	
Year	Title	U.S. Billboard 200	U.S. R&B
1995	Surrender: Released: March 14, 1995; Label: Elektra	66	12

=== Singles ===
Year	Song	Chart Positions						Album
Year	Song	Billboard Hot 100	Hot R&B/Hip-Hop Songs	Rhythmic Top 40	Hot Dance Music/ Maxi-Singles Sales	Top 40 Mainstream	Canadian Singles Chart	Album
1994	"Get Up on It" (Keith Sweat featuring Kut Klose)	62	12	25	33	–	–	Get Up on It/Surrender
1995	"I Like"	34	8	25	–	–	–	Surrender
1995	"Lovely Thang"	–	20	–	–	–	–	Surrender
1995	"Surrender"	–	48	–	–	–	–	Surrender
1996	"Twisted" (Keith Sweat featuring Kut Klose)	2	1	1	5	7	16	Keith Sweat
2010	"Let It Ring"	–	–	–	–	–	–	
