= I Want Her =

Single by Keith Sweat

from the album Make It Last Forever
- Released: September 21, 1987
- Genre: New jack swing
- Length: 5:59 (album version); 3:39 (single version)
- Label: Elektra
- Songwriter(s): Keith Sweat; Teddy Riley
- Producer(s): Keith Sweat; Teddy Riley

Keith Sweat singles chronology
"My Mind Is Made Up" (1985)	"I Want Her" (1987)	"Something Just Ain't Right" (1988)

"I Want Her" is a song by American R&B singer Keith Sweat. As the first single from his debut album, Make It Last Forever, it reached number five on the Billboard Hot 100 and number one on the Hot R&B/Hip-Hop Singles & Tracks chart for three weeks. and became the most successful number one single of 1988 on the Billboard Hot R&B chart. "I Want Her" also peaked at number 38 on the dance chart. The song topped the R&B Billboard Year-End chart for 1988. It was ranked number 6 on complex.com's list of 25 best new jack swing songs of all time.

== Track listing ==
=== US 12" single ===
A1. I Want Her (Extended Version) (6:22)
A2. I Want Her (Accapella Dub Beat) (4:07)
B1. I Want Her (Instrumental) (2:42)
B2. I Want Her (LP Version) (5:58).

=== UK 12" single ===
A1. I Want Her (Extended Version) (6:22)
A2. I Want Her (Acapella Dub Beat) (4:07)
B1. I Want Her (Dance 'Til Ya Sweat Mix) (5:00)
B2. I Want Her (Instrumental) (2:42)

== Charts ==
Chart (1987–1988)	Peak Position
Canada Top Singles (RPM)	44
New Zealand (Recorded Music NZ)	24
UK Singles (OCC)	26
US Billboard Hot 100	5
US Hot R&B/Hip-Hop Songs (Billboard)	1

=== Year-end charts ===
Chart (1988)	Position
United States (Billboard)	74

== Certifications ==
Region	Certification	Certified units/sales
United States (RIAA)	Gold	500,000^{^}
^{^} Shipments figures based on certification alone.

== See also ==
- List of Hot Black Singles number ones of 1988
- Billboard Year-End
