= Make It Last Forever (song) =

Single by Keith Sweat featuring Jacci McGhee

from the album Make It Last Forever
- Released: January 9, 1988
- Genre: New jack swing
- Length: 4:56
- Label: Vintertainment/Elektra
- Songwriters: Keith Sweat; Teddy Riley
- Producers: Keith Sweat; Teddy Riley

Keith Sweat singles chronology
"Something Just Ain't Right" (1988)	"Make It Last Forever" (1988)	"Don't Stop Your Love" (1988)

"Make It Last Forever" is a 1988 single by Keith Sweat and Jacci McGhee. The song was written and produced by Keith Sweat and Teddy Riley. Taken as the second single and the title track from Sweat's debut album, the single peaked at No. 59 on the Billboard Hot 100 and No. 2 on the Hot Black Singles chart.

== Charts ==
Chart (1988–1989)	Peak position
U.S. Billboard Hot 100	59
U.S. Billboard Hot Black Singles	2
