= Keep It Comin' =

Studio album by Keith Sweat
- Released: November 26, 1991
- Recorded: 1991
- Length: 51:33
- Label: Elektra
- Producers: Keith Sweat; Teddy Riley

Keith Sweat chronology
| I'll Give All My Love to You (1990) | Keep It Comin' (1991) | Get Up on It (1994) |

Singles from Keep It Comin'
- 1. "Keep It Comin'" Released: November 21, 1991; 2. "Why Me Baby?" Released: 1992; 3. "I Want to Love You Down" Released: 1992

Professional ratings
Review scores
| Source | Rating |
|---|---|
| Allmusic | 2/5 stars |
| Entertainment Weekly | B+ |
| Q | 4/5 stars |

Keep It Comin' is the third studio album by the American R&B recording artist Keith Sweat. It was released on November 26, 1991, and topped the R&B Albums chart upon its debut, while entering the top 20 of the Billboard 200. It spent three weeks on the former, temporarily knocking Michael Jackson's Dangerous from the top position.

The album's title track, "Keep It Comin'", was Sweat's fourth single to top the R&B chart. Two more singles "I Want To Love You Down" and "Why Me Baby" were Top 20 R&B hits. It features the album cut "There You Go (Tellin' Me No Again)", originally on the New Jack City soundtrack months earlier. On February 21, 1992, Keep It Comin' was certified platinum by the Recording Industry Association of America, for shipments of one million copies in the United States. This was the last album where Sweat collaborated with the longtime new jack swing producer Teddy Riley until Just Me was released 16 years later.

== Track listing ==
Keep It Comin' track listing
| No. | Title | Writer(s) | Length |
|---|---|---|---|
| 1. | "Keep It Comin'" (featuring Joe Public) | Lionel Job; Joe Carter; Joseph Sayles; Dwight Wyatt; Kevin Scott; Keith Sweat | 4:11 |
| 2. | "Spend a Little Time" (featuring Charlie Wilson) | Stanley Brown; Keith Sweat | 4:22 |
| 3. | "Why Me Baby?" (featuring LL Cool J) | Keith Sweat; Teddy Riley; James Todd Smith | 5:28 |
| 4. | "I Really Love You" | Keith Sweat | 3:55 |
| 5. | "Let Me Love You" | Stanley Brown; Keith Sweat | 4:04 |
| 6. | "I Want to Love You Down" | Keith Sweat; Alton "Wokie" Stewart | 5:09 |
| 7. | "I'm Going for Mine" | Keith Sweat; John Adams | 5:01 |
| 8. | "(There You Go) Tellin' Me No Again" | Keith Sweat; Bobby Wooten | 5:09 |
| 9. | "Give Me What I Want" (featuring Silk) | Keith Sweat | 5:17 |
| 10. | "Ten Commandments of Love" | Keith Sweat | 3:49 |
| 11. | "Keep It Comin' (Smooth Out Version)" | Lionel Job; Joe Carter; Joseph Sayles; Dwight Wyatt; Kevin Scott; Keith Sweat | 5:23 |

== Personnel ==
Credits for Keep It Comin' adapted from Allmusic.

- John Adams – drum programming, keyboards
- Blackjack – drum programming
- Bob Brockman – mixing
- Stanley Brown – arranger, keyboards, multi-instruments, producer
- Keni Burke – arranger, keyboards, producer
- Rodney Carruthers – background vocals
- Phil Castellano – engineer
- Jeff Chestek – engineer
- Bobby Douglas – keyboards
- Michael Evans – mixing
- Jose Fernandez – engineer
- Michael Fossenkemper – engineer
- Hiriam Hicks – executive producer
- Thomas Walter Hilton – background vocals
- John James – background vocals
- Lionel Job – producer
- Joe Public – background vocals
- George Karras – mixing
- David Kennedy – engineer, mixing
- Maurice Lauchner – background vocals
- Emmanuel Rahiem LeBlanc – background vocals
- LL Cool J – rap
- Gregg Mann – engineer, mixing
- Warren McRae – bass guitar
- Mello K. – rap
- Herb Powers – mastering
- Artie Reynolds – synthesizer
- Teddy Riley – drum programming, keyboards
- Tony Ross – background vocals
- Eddison Sansbury – drum programming, engineer, keyboards, mixing, producer
- Michael Scalcione – engineer, mixing
- Vivian Sessoms – background vocals
- Dan Sheehan – engineer
- Silk – background vocals
- Alvin Speights – engineer
- Alton "Wokie" Stewart – keyboards, producer, background vocals
- Keith Sweat – executive producer, producer, vocals, background vocals
- Brian Weber – assistant engineer
- Charlie Wilson – background vocals
- Bobby Wooten – engineer, mixing, multi Instruments, producer, synthesizer

== Charts ==
=== Weekly charts ===
Weekly chart performance for Keep It Comin'
| Chart (1991) | Peak position |
|---|---|
| Australian Albums (ARIA) | 147 |
| US Billboard 200 | 19 |
| US Top R&B/Hip-Hop Albums (Billboard) | 1 |

=== Year-end charts ===
Year-end chart performance for Keep It Comin'
| Chart (1992) | Position |
|---|---|
| US Top R&B/Hip-Hop Albums (Billboard) | 11 |

== Certifications ==
Certifications for Keep It Comin'
| Region | Certification | Certified units/sales |
|---|---|---|
| United States (RIAA) | Platinum | 1,000,000^{^} |
^{^} Shipments figures based on certification alone.

== See also ==
- List of number-one R&B albums of 1992 (U.S.)
