= Keith Sweat =

American singer and songwriter (born 1961)

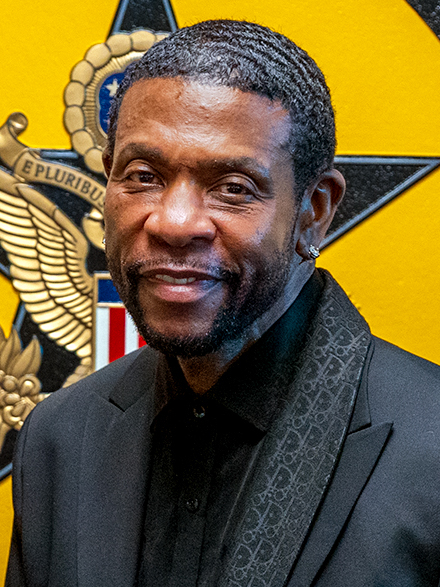
- Sweat in 2023

Background information
- Born: July 22, 1961 (age 65); New York City, U.S.
- Genres: R&B; new jack swing; hip hop; soul; urban
- Occupations: Singer; songwriter; record producer
- Years active: 1975–present
- Labels: KEIA; Stadium; Vintertainment; Elektra; Atco; Rhino; Kedar; E1; RED; Sony
- Formerly of: LSG
- Spouse: Lisa Wu (m. 1992; div. 2002)
- Children: 6
- Website: thesweathotel.com

Keith Sweat (born July 22, 1961) is an American singer, producer and songwriter. An early figure in the new jack swing musical movement, he is known for his collection of hits including "I Want Her," "Make It Last Forever," "I'll Give All My Love to You," "Make You Sweat," "Get Up on It," "Twisted," and "Nobody." He has released 13 solo albums (two as a part of the R&B supergroup LSG) and discovered the groups Silk and Kut Klose. Sweat's sound reportedly was influenced by Slave front man Steve Arrington and go-go music.

== Early life ==
Keith Sweat was born in Harlem, New York City to Juanita Thompson, a hairdresser, and Charles Sweat, a factory worker. After Charles Sweat's passing in 1973, Juanita raised their five children by herself. In his youth, Sweat performed at the famous Apollo Theater, which was near his home.

Before releasing his solo album, Sweat worked as a night stock worker at Macy's Department Store, and then a mail room clerk at Paine Webber, a brokerage firm. Additionally, he earned a degree in communications from City College of New York. “I think everyone should have an alternative plan. In my case, I went to the City College of New York and got my degree in communications. So I had a backup plan so that I didn’t lose out on a decent future,” Sweat once said.

Within just four years, he worked his way up to a lucrative brokerage assistant job on the floor of the New York Stock Exchange. Sweat also worked as a supervisor for the New York Mercantile Exchange.

== Career ==
=== 1975–1984: Career beginnings with Jamilah ===
Sweat started his musical career as a member of a Harlem band called Jamilah in 1975. With the help of Jamilah, Sweat was able to hone his craft as a lead singer by performing regionally throughout the Tri-state area of New York, New Jersey, and Connecticut. The group was started by bassist Larry Peoples, guitarist Michael Samuels, and drummer Walter Bradley.

After leaving the group in 1984 to begin a solo career, Sweat sang at nightclubs throughout New York City and landed a chance to record for the independent label, Stadium Records. Sweat recorded only two tunes for Stadium, "Lucky Seven" and "My Mind Is Made Up," which was their third and fourth ever release, but on Stadium's first release, he is credited as co-writer and co-producer of "You Are the One for Me," the last recording ever made by the group GQ. One of GQ's original members is his uncle, Keith "Sabu" Crier.

=== 1987–1989: Make It Last Forever ===
Later in 1987, Keith Sweat was discovered by Vincent Davis and offered a recording contract with his label, Vintertainment Records, which was founded in 1983 on the foundations of early Hip-Hop and otherwise best known for releasing Joeski Love's "Pee Wee's Dance" in 1985. Vintertainment was distributed by Elektra Records from 1985 until it ceased operations in 1990.

While crafting his debut album, Sweat pursued fellow Harlem resident Teddy Riley, who, at this time, was better known for writing for and producing hip-hop artists. According to Riley, he already had the beats prepared for "I Want Her" and "Make It Last Forever," along with all of the background vocals for "I Want Her." Riley had no intention of producing R&B music, and he also encouraged Sweat to sing in what would become his trademark nasal sound to distinguish his voice from other artists. Riley noted that Sweat's songwriting style also was unique as he composed lyrics instantly while listening to the track, as he did for the single, "Make It Last Forever."

On November 24, 1987, Sweat released Make It Last Forever, which sold three million copies. He and Riley co-wrote six songs; and the biggest hit was "I Want Her" (No. 1 R&B & No. 5 Pop), which was nominated for the 1989 Soul Train Best R&B/Urban Contemporary Song of the Year award, while the title track from the album hit No. 2 on the R&B charts.

=== 1990-1991: I'll Give All My Love to You, and Keep It Comin ===
Sweat reached the charts again with his second album I'll Give All My Love to You (1990) which hit No. 6 on the Billboard 200 chart. He released his third album, Keep It Comin' in 1991, which debuted in the Top 20 of the album chart. He produced soul singer Omar Chandler.

=== 1992–2001: Get Up on It, Keith Sweat/LSG ===
In 1992, Sweat discovered the group Silk, and helped craft their debut album, Lose Control, which hit No. 7 on the Billboard 200 album chart.

The album's single "Freak Me" hit No. 1 on the Billboard Hot 100 on May 1, 1993. In 1993, Sweat discovered the Atlanta-based female R&B group Kut Klose. Sweat also produced the group's debut album Surrender, which produced their biggest hit single "I Like", peaking to No. 8 on the Hot R&B/Hip-Hop Singles & Tracks chart.

In the fall of 1994, Sweat appeared in the group Black Men United (BMU) reuniting with Silk, Gerald Levert, Al B. Sure!, Brian McKnight, El DeBarge and others for the single "U Will Know", which was written by R&B musician D'Angelo for the soundtrack the film Jason's Lyric.

Sweat released his fourth album Get Up on It in the summer of 1994, and his self-titled fifth album in 1996. Both albums reached the top ten on the Billboard 200. The single co/produced and written by Eric McCaine "Twisted" featuring R&B group Kut Klose hit No. 2 on the Billboard Hot 100 and "Nobody" hit No. 3, which made them Sweat's biggest hits to date. "Just A Touch" was a cover of the 1979 song "Just a Touch of Love" by Slave. He produced for R&B group Dru Hill in 1996.

In the fall of 1997, Sweat discovered the group Ol' Skool and helped with their self-titled debut. He was on their biggest single, "Am I Dreaming", which featured the R&B group Xscape. Sweat also formed the R&B supergroup LSG with Gerald Levert and Johnny Gill, and released their self-titled debut album Levert.Sweat.Gill was released that November. That album featured "My Body", which became a hit single. The album was certified double platinum and reached No. 4 on the U.S. Billboard 200.

Sweat's sixth album, Still in the Game was released in 1998, hitting No. 6 on the Billboard 200, and No. 2 on the R&B/Hip Hop albums chart. It featured the singles "Come and Get With Me" (which featured rapper Snoop Dogg) (No. 12 Hot 100) and "I'm Not Ready" (No. 16 Hot 100). Sweat's success on the charts started to diminish in 2000, when he released the album Didn't See Me Coming. None of the singles from the album reached the top forty.

=== 2002–present: Rebirth, Just Me, Ridin Solo, and Til the Morning ===
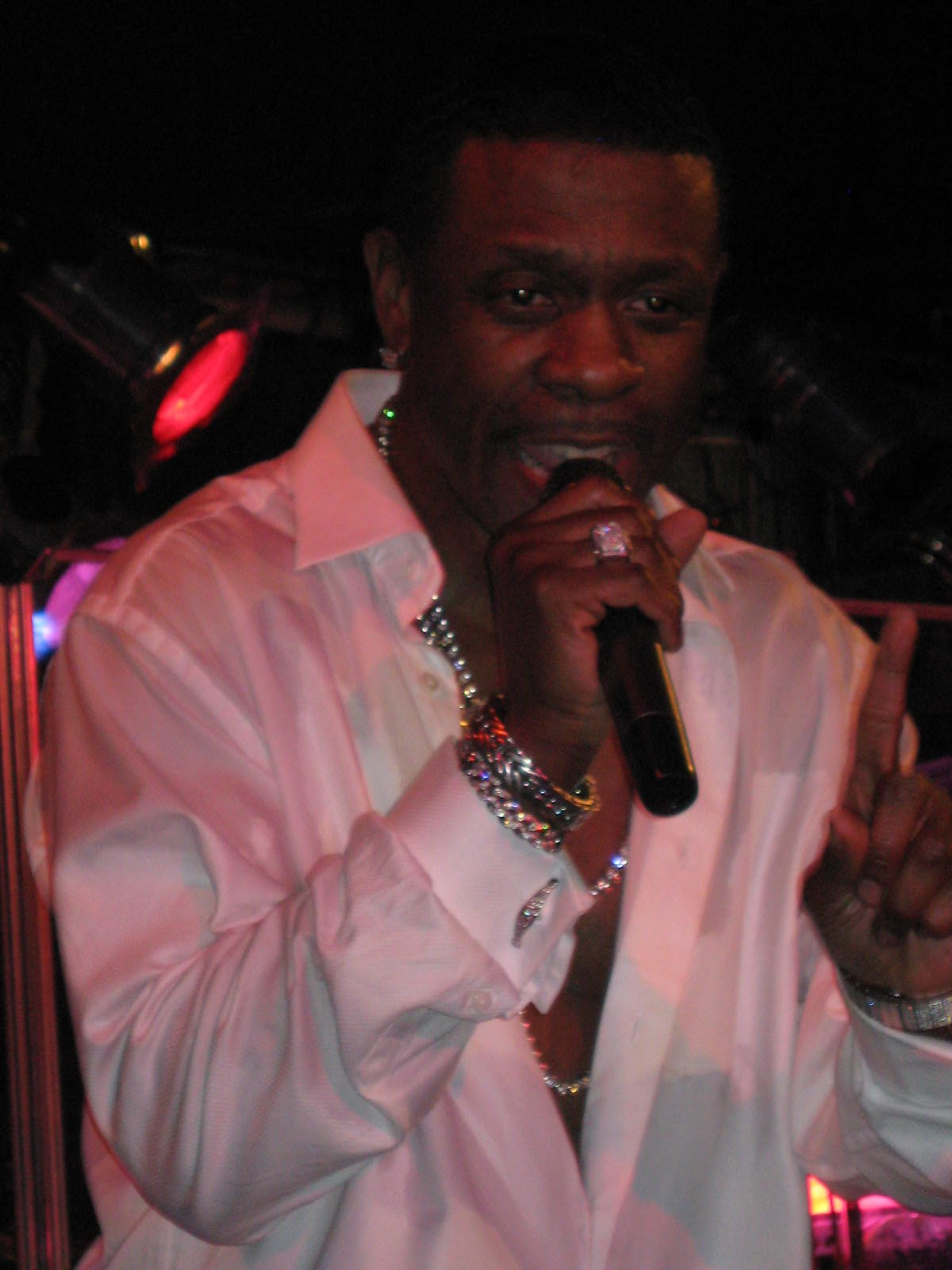
Sweat performing in 2009

On August 13, 2002, Keith Sweat released his eighth album, Rebirth. The single "One on One" reached No. 75 on the Billboard Hot 100 and No. 44 on the Hot R&B/Hip-Hop Singles & Tracks chart. His 2008 album Just Me included the single, "Love U Better (featuring Keyshia Cole)". Sweat is currently signed to Kedar Records and released his tenth studio album entitled Ridin' Solo on June 22, 2010. The lead single taken from the album is "Test Drive" and featured label-mate Joe.

Since 2007, Sweat has been the host of The Keith Sweat Hotel —a nationally syndicated radio program with Premiere Networks based upon the Quiet storm format.

== Personal life ==
From 1992 until 2002, Sweat was married to The Real Housewives of Atlanta star Lisa Wu Hartwell. With her, he had two sons, born in 1995 and 1998.

He also has three daughters, one with Tracy J. He also has a son named Joshua.

== Discography ==
Studio albums

- Make It Last Forever (1987)
- I'll Give All My Love to You (1990)
- Keep It Comin' (1991)
- Get Up on It (1994)
- Keith Sweat (1996)
- Still in the Game (1998)
- Didn't See Me Coming (2000)
- Rebirth (2002)
- A Christmas of Love (2007)
- Just Me (2008)
- Ridin' Solo (2010)
- Til the Morning (2011)
- Dress to Impress (2016)
- Playing for Keeps (2018)

Collaboration albums

- Levert.Sweat.Gill (1997)
- LSG2 (2003)

== Filmography ==
=== Film ===
Year	Title	Role	Notes
1991	New Jack City	Singer at Wedding	
2000	Rhapsody	Will	TV movie
2006	Forbidden Fruits	Terrence	Video
2009	Pastor Brown	Nasim	
2018	Love Magical	Delonte Skywalker	
2021	For the Love of Money	Chris	
2023	You're Not Alone	Johnson	

=== Television ===
Year	Title	Role	Notes
1988	Showtime at the Apollo	Himself/Guest Host	Episode: "Episode #2.10"
1994	New York Undercover	Himself	Episode: "Mate"
1997	Martin	Det. Carl Johnson	Episode: "Stake-Out"
1997	The Wayans Bros.	Himself	Guest Cast: Seasons 3-4
2011	The Game	Himself	Episode: "Death Becomes Her"
2017	Hell's Kitchen	Himself/Restaurant Patron	Episode: "Raising the Bar"

== Awards and nominations ==
- American Music Awards
  - 1991: Favorite R&B/Soul Male Artist (nominated)
  - 1997: Favorite Male R&B/Soul Artist (winner)
  - 1997: Favorite R&B/Soul Album for Keith Sweat (nominated)
  - 1998: Favorite Male R&B/Soul Artist (nominated)
  - 2013: Soul Train Lifetime Achievement Award

== See also ==
- List of people from Harlem
