= List of songs recorded by Whitney Houston =

Songs recorded by Whitney Houston
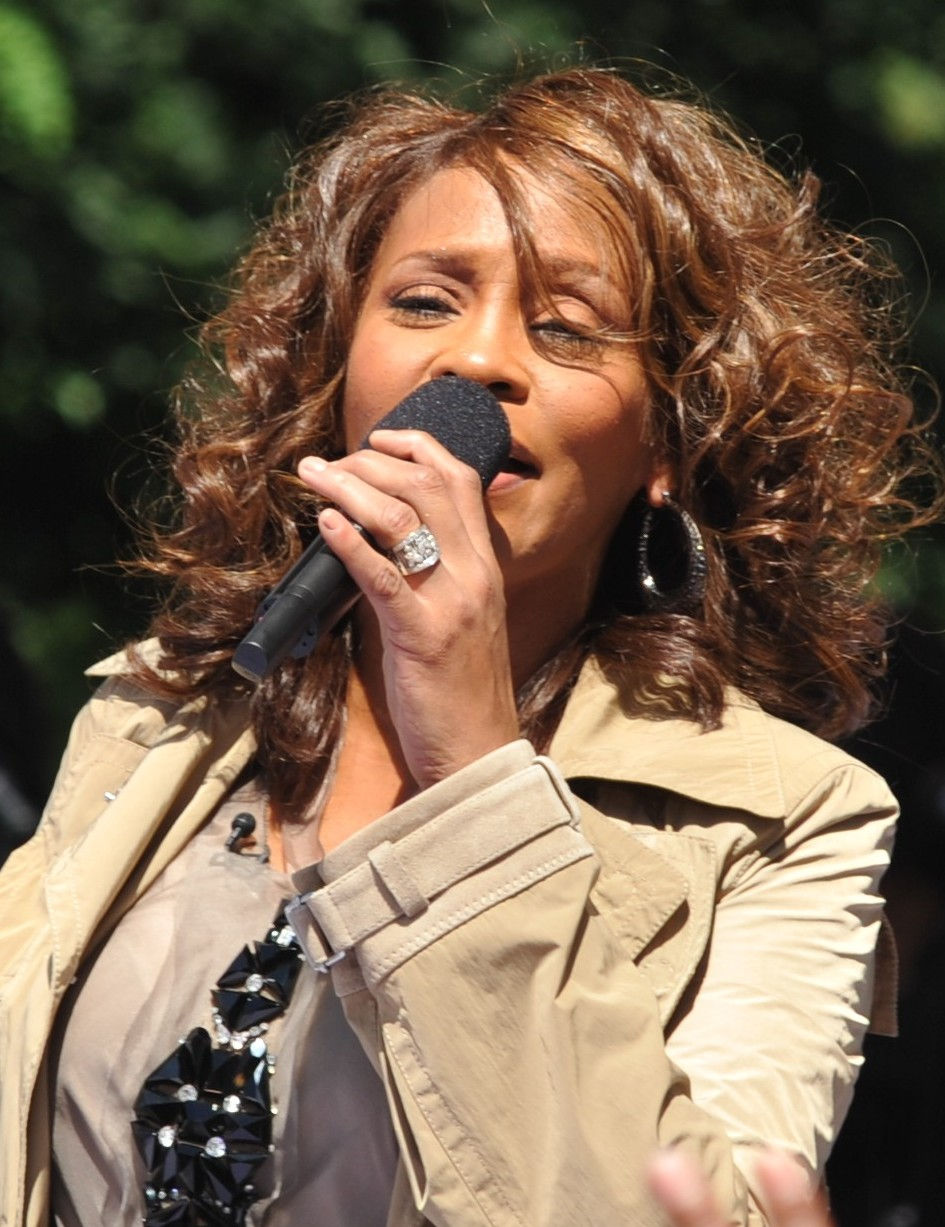
- Houston performing on Good Morning America, Central Park, New York City, on September 1, 2009
- Released songs: 205
- Unreleased songs: 6

American singer Whitney Houston, nicknamed "The Voice", recorded songs for her seven studio albums and her two soundtrack albums, as well as contributing songs to two other soundtracks (Waiting to Exhale and Sparkle). Her self-titled debut album was released on February 14, 1985. It peaked at number one on US Billboard 200 album chart, a position it held for 14 weeks. "You Give Good Love" was released as the lead single, written for Houston by La La and produced by Kashif, becoming Houston's first top ten single. The final three singles to be released from the album, "Saving All My Love for You", "How Will I Know" and "Greatest Love of All", all topped the US Billboard Hot 100 singles chart. This marked the first time in the chart's history that a debut album, and a debut album released by a female artist, had generated three number one singles.

Houston released her second studio album, Whitney, on June 2, 1987. The album became the first by a female artist to debut atop the US Billboard 200 album chart, a position it held for 11 weeks. "I Wanna Dance with Somebody (Who Loves Me)" was released as the lead single. The dance-pop song was written by George Merrill and Shannon Rubicam. It was ranked at number 88 on Slant Magazine's list of the 100 Greatest Dance Songs in 2006. "I Wanna Dance With Somebody (Who Loves Me)", along with the following three singles to be released from Whitney, ("Didn't We Almost Have It All", "So Emotional" and "Where Do Broken Hearts Go"), all peaked at number one on the US Billboard Hot 100 singles chart. Houston holds for the record for the most consecutive number one singles on the chart, with seven. Her third studio album, I'm Your Baby Tonight, was released on November 6, 1990. It was decided by her record label executive, Clive Davis at Arista Records, that Houston should grow as an artist and develop her music further by making an R&B album instead of another pop music album. Davis enlisted L.A. Reid and Babyface to compose more R&B driven songs. The title track was released as the lead single from the album, and it was written by Reid and Babyface. It topped the US Hot R&B/Hip-Hop Songs chart. The second single, "All the Man That I Need", is an "expression of sexual hero worship" according to Stephen Holden writing for The New York Times.

Between 1992 and 1996, Houston recorded songs which were included on three different soundtrack albums. A cover of the Dolly Parton song "I Will Always Love You" was released as the lead single from The Bodyguard soundtrack from the film of the same name in 1992. It peaked at number one on the Hot 100 for 14 weeks in 1992–1993. Houston broke the record for the longest running number one single since the chart's inception in 1958. Houston recorded three songs for the Waiting to Exhale soundtrack for the film of the same name, both of which were released in November 1995. "Exhale (Shoop Shoop)" was released as the lead single; it is an R&B ballad written by Babyface which summarizes the plot of the film. "Exhale (Shoop Shoop)" becomes the third single to debut at number one on the US Hot 100 in the history of the chart. The other two songs which she recorded for the album were "Why Does It Hurt So Bad", another R&B ballad penned by Babyface, and a duet with CeCe Winans called "Count On Me", co-written by Houston. Houston recorded a full length soundtrack to accompany the film The Preacher's Wife, both of which were released in 1996. Three singles were released to promote the film and album: "I Believe in You and Me", a cover of Annie Lennox's "Step by Step" and "My Heart Is Calling". The latter of the three draws musical inspiration from the genres of funk and gospel.

In 1998, Houston returned to studio work with her fourth studio album, My Love Is Your Love. The album was a musical departure for Houston as it ventured into hip-hop soul, neo soul and reggae fusion. The album launched five singles, all of which received chart and sales success, including the duet, "Heartbreak Hotel", "It's Not Right but It's Okay" and the title track, which became one of the biggest global hits of her career and was inspired by Houston's relationship with her daughter, Bobbi Kristina Brown, who was promptly featured on the track. Houston released her fifth studio album, entitled Just Whitney in December 2002. The singer co-wrote the lead single, "Whatchulookinat", which was co-produced by her husband, Bobby Brown. The song is a response to how Houston considered herself to be a victim of unwanted media attention. The album's second single, "One of Those Days", is a slow R&B track with a retro feel. Houston released her first and only Christmas album in November 2003. She recorded cover versions of several traditional Christmas songs, including "The First Noel" and "Little Drummer Boy". "One Wish (For Christmas)" was released as the sole single from the album. Her sixth studio album, I Look to You, was released in August 2009. The title track is a gospel song, written by R. Kelly, which pertains to Houston's faith in God. The album's second single, "Million Dollar Bill", is an old school R&B song which was written by Alicia Keys, Swizz Beatz and Norman Harris.

== Songs ==
Key
| † | Indicates single release |
| ‡ | Indicates song co-written by Houston |

| Song | Artist(s) | Writer(s) | Album | Year | Ref. |
|---|---|---|---|---|---|
| "After We Make Love" | Whitney Houston | Gerry Goffin; Michael Masser | I'm Your Baby Tonight | 1990 | |
| "Ain't No Way" (live) | Whitney Houston and Mary J. Blige | Carolyn Franklin | Divas Live '99 | 1999 | |
| "All at Once" † | Whitney Houston | Jeffrey Osborne; Michael Masser | Whitney Houston | 1985 | |
| "All the Man That I Need" † | iWhitney Houston | Dean Pitchford; Michael Gore | I'm Your Baby Tonight | 1990 | |
| "All the Man That I Need" (live, 1991) | Whitney Houston | Dean Pitchford; Michael Gore | Whitney Houston Live: Her Greatest Performances | 2014 | |
| "America the Beautiful" | Whitney Houston | Katharine Lee Bates; Samuel A. Ward | B-side to "The Star Spangled Banner" | 1991 | |
| "Anymore" | Whitney Houston | Kenneth Edmonds; L.A. Reid | I'm Your Baby Tonight | 1990 | |
| "Believe in Love" | Sunday (featuring uncredited vocals by Whitney Houston) | Fred Jerkins III; Harvey Mason Jr. LaShawn Daniels; Rodney Jerkins | Down in the Delta | 1998 | |
| "Call You Tonight" | Whitney Houston | Johntá Austin; Mikkel S. Eriksen; Tor Erik Hermansen | I Look to You | 2009 | |
| "Cantique de Nöel (O Holy Night)" | Whitney Houston | Traditional | One Wish: The Holiday Album | 2003 | |
| "Celebrate" † | Whitney Houston and Jordin Sparks | R. Kelly | Sparkle | 2012 | |
| "The Christmas Song (Chestnuts Roasting on an Open Fire)" | Whitney Houston | Mel Tormé; Robert Wells | One Wish: The Holiday Album | 2003 | |
| "Could I Have This Kiss Forever" † | Whitney Houston and Enrique Iglesias | Diane Warren | Whitney: The Greatest Hits and Enrique | 1999 | |
| "Count On Me" † | Whitney Houston and CeCe Winans | Whitney Houston ‡ Kenneth Edmonds; Michael Houston | Waiting to Exhale | 1995 | |
| "Dancin' on the Smooth Edge" | Whitney Houston | David Lasley; Robbie Long | B-side to "All the Man That I Need" | 1990 | |
| "Dear John Letter" | Whitney Houston | Whitney Houston ‡ Dwight Reynolds; Kevin "She'kspere" Briggs; Patrice Stewart | Just Whitney | 2002 | |
| "Deck the Halls / Silent Night" | Whitney Houston | Traditional | One Wish: The Holiday Album | 2003 | |
| "Didn't We Almost Have It All" † | Whitney Houston | Michael Masser; Will Jennings | Whitney | 1987 | |
| "Didn't We Almost Have It All" (live, 1987) | Whitney Houston | Michael Masser; Will Jennings | B-side to "So Emotional" | 1987 | |
| "Do You Hear What I Hear?" | Whitney Houston | Noël Regney; Gloria Shayne Baker | A Very Special Christmas | 1987 | |
| "Do You Hear What I Hear?" | Pentatonix featuring Whitney Houston | Noël Regney; Gloria Shayne Baker | The Best of Pentatonix Christmas | 2019 | |
| "Don't Look Any Further" | Jermaine Jackson and Whitney Houston | Unknown | Unreleased | 1984 | |
| "Eternal Love" | Paul Jabara featuring Whitney Houston | Jay Asher; Paul Jabara | Paul Jabara & Friends | 1983 | |
| "Exhale (Shoop Shoop)" † | Whitney Houston | Kenneth Edmonds | Waiting to Exhale | 1995 | |
| "Feels So Good" | Whitney Houston | Bryan Loren | B-side to "I'm Your Baby Tonight" | 1990 | |
| "Family First" | Whitney Houston, Cissy Houston, Dionne Warwick and Family | Carlos McKinney; Kandice Love | Daddy's Little Girls | 2007 | |
| "Far Enough for Love" | Whitney Houston | Michael Masser | Unreleased | 1989 | |
| "Fine" † | Whitney Houston | Whitney Houston ‡ Kamaal Fareed; Raphael Saadiq | Whitney: The Greatest Hits | 2000 | |
| "The First Noel" | Whitney Houston | Traditional | One Wish: The Holiday Album | 2003 | |
| "For the Love of You" | Whitney Houston | Chris Jasper; Marvin Isley; O'Kelly Isley; Ronald Isley | Whitney | 1987 | |
| "For the Lovers" | Whitney Houston | Claude Kelly; Marcella Araica; Nathaniel Hills | I Look to You | 2009 | |
| "Get It Back" | Whitney Houston | Fred Jerkins III; LaShawn Daniels; Toni Estes; Rodney Jerkins | My Love Is Your Love | 1998 | |
| "Greatest Love of All" † | Whitney Houston | Linda Creed; Michael Masser | Whitney Houston | 1985 | |
| "Greatest Love of All" (live, 1990) | Whitney Houston | Linda Creed; Michael Masser | Whitney Houston (Deluxe Anniversary edition) | 2010 | |
| "Halfway Through the Night" | Whitney Houston | Michael Masser; Cynthia Weil | Unreleased | 1990 | |
| "Have Yourself a Merry Little Christmas" | Whitney Houston | Hugh Martin; Ralph Blane | One Wish: The Holiday Album | 2003 | |
| "He's All Over Me" | Whitney Houston with Shirley Caesar and the Georgia Mass Choir | Alvin Darling | The Preacher's Wife | 1996 | |
| "Heartbreak Hotel" † | Whitney Houston featuring Faith Evans and Kelly Price | Carsten Schack; Kenneth Karlin; Tamara Savage | My Love Is Your Love | 1998 | |
| "Higher Love" | Whitney Houston | Steve Winwood; Will Jennings | I'm Your Baby Tonight (Japanese edition) | 1990 | |
| "Higher Love" † | Kygo and Whitney Houston | Steve Winwood; Will Jennings | Golden Hour | 2019 | |
| "His Eye Is On the Sparrow" † | Whitney Houston | Civilla D. Martin; Charles H. Gabriel | Sparkle | 2012 | |
| "Hold Me" † | Teddy Pendergrass and Whitney Houston | Linda Creed; Michael Masser | Love Language and Whitney Houston | 1984 | |
| "Hold On, Help Is on the Way" | Whitney Houston with the Georgia Mass Choir | Rev. Kenneth Paden | The Preacher's Wife | 1996 | |
| "Hold Up the Light" | BeBe & CeCe Winans featuring Whitney Houston | Percy Bady; Benjamin Winans | Heaven | 1988 | |
| "Home" (live, 1983) | Whitney Houston | Charlie Smalls | Whitney Houston Live: Her Greatest Performances | 2014 | |
| "How Will I Know" † | Whitney Houston | George Merrill; Narada Michael Walden; Shannon Rubicam | Whitney Houston | 1985 | |
| "How Will I Know" (live, 1987) | Whitney Houston | George Merrill; Narada Michael Walden; Shannon Rubicam | Whitney Houston Live: Her Greatest Performances | 2014 | |
| "I Believe in You and Me" † | Whitney Houston | David Wolfert; Sandy Linzer | The Preacher's Wife | 1996 | |
| "I Believe in You and Me" (live, 2004) | Whitney Houston | David Wolfert; Sandy Linzer | Whitney Houston Live: Her Greatest Performances | 2014 | |
| "I Belong to You" † | Whitney Houston | Derek Bramble; Franne Gold | I'm Your Baby Tonight | 1990 | |
| "I Bow Out" | Whitney Houston | Diane Warren | My Love Is Your Love | 1998 | |
| "I Didn't Know My Own Strength" | Whitney Houston | Diane Warren | I Look to You | 2009 | |
| "I Didn't Know My Own Strength" (live, 2009) | Whitney Houston | Diane Warren | Whitney Houston Live: Her Greatest Performances | 2014 | |
| "I Have Nothing" † | Whitney Houston | David Foster; Linda Thompson | The Bodyguard | 1992 | |
| "I Have Nothing" (live, 1996) | Whitney Houston | David Foster; Linda Thompson | I Wish You Love: More from The Bodyguard | 2017 | |
| "I Go to the Rock" | Whitney Houston with the Georgia Mass Choir | Dottie Rambo | The Preacher's Wife | 1996 | |
| "I Got You" | Whitney Houston | Whitney Houston ‡ Aliaune Thiam; Claude Kelly; Giorgio Tuinfort | I Look to You | 2009 | |
| "I Know Him So Well" † | Cissy Houston and Whitney Houston | Benny Andersson; Björn Ulvaeus; Tim Rice | Whitney | 1987 | |
| "I Learned from the Best" † | Whitney Houston | Diane Warren | My Love Is Your Love | 1998 | |
| "I Look to You" † | Whitney Houston | R. Kelly | I Look to You | 2009 | |
| "I Look to You" † | Whitney Houston and R. Kelly | R. Kelly | I Will Always Love You: The Best of Whitney Houston | 2012 | |
| "I Love the Lord" | Whitney Houston with the Georgia Mass Choir | Richard Smallwood | The Preacher's Wife | 1996 | |
| "I Was Made to Love Him" | Whitney Houston | Henry Cosby; Lula Mae Hardaway; Sylvia Moy; Stevie Wonder | My Love Is Your Love | 1998 | |
| "I Wanna Dance with Somebody (Who Loves Me)" † | Whitney Houston | George Merrill; Shannon Rubicam | Whitney | 1987 | |
| "I Wanna Dance with Somebody (Who Loves Me)" (live, 1990) | Whitney Houston | George Merrill; Shannon Rubicam | Whitney Houston Live: Her Greatest Performances | 2014 | |
| "I Will Always Love You" † | Whitney Houston | Dolly Parton | The Bodyguard | 1992 | |
| "I Will Always Love You" (live, 1993) | Whitney Houston | Dolly Parton | I Wish You Love: More from The Bodyguard | 2017 | |
| "I Will Always Love You" (live, 1994) | Whitney Houston | Dolly Parton | Whitney Houston Live: Her Greatest Performances | 2014 | |
| "I Will Always Love You" (live, 1999) | Whitney Houston | Dolly Parton | Divas Live '99 | 1999 | |
| "If I Told You That" | Whitney Houston | Fred Jerkins III; LaShawn Daniels; Toni Estes; Rodney Jerkins | My Love Is Your Love | 1998 | |
| "If I Told You That" † | Whitney Houston and George Michael | Fred Jerkins III; LaShawn Daniels; Toni Estes; Rodney Jerkins | Whitney: The Greatest Hits | 2000 | |
| "If You Say My Eyes Are Beautiful" | Jermaine Jackson and Whitney Houston | Elliot Willensky | Precious Moments | 1986 | |
| "I'll Be Home for Christmas" | Whitney Houston | Buck Ram; Kim Gannon; Walter Kent | One Wish: The Holiday Album | 2003 | |
| "Impossible / It's Possible" | Whitney Houston and Brandy | Richard Rodgers; Oscar Hammerstein II | —N/a | 1997 | |
| "I'm Every Woman" † | Whitney Houston | Nickolas Ashford; Valerie Simpson | The Bodyguard | 1992 | |
| "I'm Every Woman" (live, 1993) | Whitney Houston | Nickolas Ashford; Valerie Simpson | I Wish You Love: More from The Bodyguard | 2017 | |
| "I'm Every Woman" (live, 1994) | Whitney Houston | Nickolas Ashford; Valerie Simpson | Whitney Houston Live: Her Greatest Performances | 2014 | |
| "I'm Every Woman" (live, 1999) | Whitney Houston and Chaka Khan | Nickolas Ashford; Valerie Simpson | Divas Live '99 | 1999 | |
| "I'm Every Woman" (live reprise, 1999) | Whitney Houston, Chaka Khan, Faith Hill, Brandy, Mary J. Blige and LeAnn Rimes | Nickolas Ashford; Valerie Simpson | Divas Live '99 | 1999 | |
| "I'm Knockin'" | Whitney Houston | Benjamin Winans; Rhett Lawrence; Ricky Minor | I'm Your Baby Tonight | 1990 | |
| "I'm Your Baby Tonight" † | Whitney Houston | Kenneth Edmonds; L.A. Reid | I'm Your Baby Tonight | 1990 | |
| "I'm Your Baby Tonight" (live, 1991) | Whitney Houston | Kenneth Edmonds; L.A. Reid | Whitney Houston Live: Her Greatest Performances | 2014 | |
| "In My Business" | Whitney Houston featuring Missy Elliott | Kelvin "K.B." Bradshaw; Lloyd "Spec" Turner; Missy Elliott | My Love Is Your Love | 1998 | |
| "It Isn't, It Wasn't, It Ain't Never Gonna Be" † | Aretha Franklin and Whitney Houston | Albert Hammond; Diane Warren | Through the Storm | 1989 | |
| "It'll Be Okay" | Ray J featuring Whitney Houston | Unknown | Unreleased | 2007 | |
| "It's Not Right but It's Okay" † | Whitney Houston | Fred Jerkins III; Isaac Phillips; LaShawn Daniels; Toni Estes; Rodney Jerkins | My Love Is Your Love | 1998 | |
| "It's Not Right but It's Okay" (live, 1999) | Whitney Houston | Fred Jerkins III; Isaac Phillips; LaShawn Daniels; Toni Estes; Rodney Jerkins | Divas Live '99: Whitney Houston (Digital EP) | 2014 | |
| "Jesus Loves Me" | Whitney Houston | Anna Bartlett Warner; William Batchelder Bradbury | The Bodyguard | 1992 | |
| "Jesus Loves Me / He's Got the Whole World in His Hands" (live, 1994) | Whitney Houston | Anna Bartlett Warner; William Batchelder Bradbury / Traditional | I Wish You Love: More from The Bodyguard | 2017 | |
| "Joy" | Whitney Houston with the Georgia Mass Choir | Kirk Franklin | The Preacher's Wife | 1996 | |
| "Joy to the World" | Whitney Houston with the Georgia Mass Choir | Isaac Watts | The Preacher's Wife | 1996 | |
| "Just the Lonely Talking Again" | Whitney Houston | Sam Dees | Whitney | 1987 | |
| "King Holiday" † | King Dream Chorus and Holiday Crew | Phillip Jones; Kurtis Blow; Melle Mel; Bill Adler | —N/a | 1986 | |
| "Lay Aside Every Weight" | Whitney Houston with the Georgia Mass Choir | Glen Burleigh | Unreleased | 1996 | |
| "Life's a Party" † | Michael Zager Band (featuring uncredited vocals by Whitney Houston) | Michael Zager | Life's a Party | 1978 | |
| "Like I Never Left" | Whitney Houston featuring Akon | Whitney Houston ‡ Aliaune Thiam; Claude Kelly; Giorgio Tuinfort | I Look to You | 2009 | |
| "Little Drummer Boy" | Whitney Houston featuring Bobbi Kristina Brown | Harry Simeone; Henry Onorati; Katherine Davis | One Wish: The Holiday Album | 2003 | |
| "Look Into Your Heart" | Whitney Houston | Curtis Mayfield | A Tribute to Curtis Mayfield | 1994 | |
| "Love Is" | Whitney Houston | Carvin Winans | The Concert for a New South Africa (Durban) | 1990 | |
| "Love Is a Contact Sport" | Whitney Houston | Preston Glass | Whitney | 1987 | |
| "Love That Man" † | Whitney Houston | Bill Lee; Balewa Muhammad; Calvin Gaines; Eritza Laues; Kenneth Edmonds; Rob Fusari | Just Whitney | 2002 | |
| "Love Will Find a Way" | Dionne Warwick and Whitney Houston | David L. Elliott; Terry Steele | Friends Can Be Lovers | 1993 | |
| "Love Will Save the Day" † | Whitney Houston | Antoinette Colandreo | Whitney | 1987 | |
| "Lover for Life" | Whitney Houston | Sam Dees | I'm Your Baby Tonight | 1990 | |
| "Medley: I Loves You Porgy / And I Am Telling You I'm Not Going / I Have Nothing" (live, 1994) | Whitney Houston | George Gershwin; Ira Gershwin / Tom Eyen; Henry Krieger / David Foster; Linda Thompson | Whitney Houston Live: Her Greatest Performances | 2014 | |
| "Memories" | Material featuring Whitney Houston | Hugh Hopper | One Down | 1982 | |
| "Memories" † | Siti Nurhaliza and Whitney Houston | Hugh Hopper | —N/a | 2016 | |
| "Million Dollar Bill" † | Whitney Houston | Alicia Keys; Kasseem Dean; Norman Harris | I Look to You | 2009 | |
| "Miracle" † | Whitney Houston | Kenneth Edmonds; L.A. Reid | I'm Your Baby Tonight | 1990 | |
| "Moment of Truth" | Whitney Houston | Jan Buckingham; David Paul Bryant | B-side to "I Wanna Dance with Somebody (Who Loves Me)" | 1987 | |
| "My Heart Is Calling" † | Whitney Houston | Kenneth Edmonds | The Preacher's Wife | 1996 | |
| "My Name Is Not Susan" † | Whitney Houston | Eric Foster White | I'm Your Baby Tonight | 1990 | |
| "My Love" | Whitney Houston featuring Bobby Brown | Greg Charley; Gordon Chambers; Ted Bishop | Just Whitney | 2002 | |
| "My Love Is Your Love" † | Whitney Houston | Jerry Duplessis; Wyclef Jean | My Love Is Your Love | 1998 | |
| "My Love Is Your Love" (live, 1998) | Whitney Houston | Jerry Duplessis; Wyclef Jean | Whitney Houston Live: Her Greatest Performances | 2014 | |
| "My Love Is Your Love" (live, 1999) | Whitney Houston and Treach | Jerry Duplessis; Wyclef Jean | Divas Live '99: Whitney Houston (Digital EP) | 2014 | |
| "Never Give Up" | Whitney Houston | Jermaine Dupri; Bryan-Michael Cox; Johntá Austin | I Will Always Love You: The Best of Whitney Houston | 2012 | |
| "Nobody Does It Better" (intro) | Bobby Brown featuring Whitney Houston | Marvin Hamlisch; Carole Bayer Sager | Forever | 1997 | |
| "Nobody Loves Me Like You Do" | Whitney Houston and Jermaine Jackson | James P. Dunne; Pamela Phillips | Whitney Houston | 1985 | |
| "Nothin' But Love" | Whitney Houston | Fernando Garibay; Franne Gold; Kasia Livingston; Nathaniel Hills | I Look to You | 2009 | |
| "O come, O come, Emmanuel" | Whitney Houston | Hugh Martin; Ralph Blane | One Wish: The Holiday Album | 2003 | |
| "Oh Yes" | Whitney Houston | Kelvin "K.B." Bradshaw; Lloyd "Spec" Turner; Missy Elliott | My Love Is Your Love | 1998 | |
| "One Moment in Time" † | Whitney Houston | Albert Hammond; John Bettis | 1988 Summer Olympics Album: One Moment in Time | 1988 | |
| "One Moment in Time" (live, 1989) | Whitney Houston | Albert Hammond; John Bettis | Whitney Houston Live: Her Greatest Performances | 2014 | |
| "One of Those Days" † | Whitney Houston | Whitney Houston ‡ Chris Jasper; Dwight Reynolds; Ernie Isley; Kevin "She'kspere" Briggs; Marvin Isley; O'Kelly Isley, Jr. Patrice Stewart; Ronald Isley; Rudolph Isley | Just Whitney | 2002 | |
| "One Wish (For Christmas)" † | Whitney Houston | Freddie Jackson; Gordon Chambers; Barry Eastmond | One Wish: The Holiday Album | 2003 | |
| "Queen of the Night" † | Whitney Houston | Whitney Houston ‡ Daryl Simmons; Kenneth Edmonds; L.A. Reid | The Bodyguard | 1992 | |
| "Queen of the Night" (live, 1994) | Whitney Houston | Whitney Houston ‡ Daryl Simmons; Kenneth Edmonds; L.A. Reid | I Wish You Love: More from The Bodyguard | 2017 | |
| "Run to You" † | Whitney Houston | Allan Rich; Jud Freidman | The Bodyguard | 1992 | |
| "Run to You" (live, 1994) | Whitney Houston | Allan Rich; Jud Freidman | I Wish You Love: More from The Bodyguard | 2017 | |
| "Salute" | Whitney Houston | R. Kelly | I Look to You | 2009 | |
| "Same Script, Different Cast" † | Whitney Houston and Deborah Cox | Montell Jordan; Shae Jones; Shep Crawford; Stacey Daniels | Whitney: The Greatest Hits | 2000 | |
| "Saving All My Love for You" † | Whitney Houston | Gerry Goffin; Michael Masser | Whitney Houston | 1985 | |
| "Shock Me" | Jermaine Jackson and Whitney Houston | Bruce Roberts; Andy Goldmark | Perfect | 1985 | |
| "So Emotional" † | Whitney Houston | Billy Steinberg; Tom Kelly | Whitney | 1987 | |
| "Somebody Bigger Than You and I" | Whitney Houston featuring Bobby Brown, Faith Evans, Johnny Gill, Monica and Ralph Tresvant | Hy Heath; Johnny Lange; Sonny Burke | The Preacher's Wife | 1996 | |
| "Someone for Me" † | Whitney Houston | Freddie Washington; Raymond Jones | Whitney Houston | 1985 | |
| "Something in Common" † | Bobby Brown and Whitney Houston | Bobby Brown; Whitney Houston ‡ Teddy Riley; Bernard Belle; Mark Middleton; Alfred Rosemond | Bobby | 1992 | |
| "A Song for You" (live, 1991) | Whitney Houston | Leon Russell | Whitney Houston Live: Her Greatest Performances | 2014 | |
| "A Song for You" | Whitney Houston | Leon Russell | I Look to You | 2009 | |
| "The Star Spangled Banner" (live) † | Whitney Houston | Francis Scott Key | —N/a | 1991 | |
| "Stop the Madness" † | Stop the Madness | Tim Reid; Michael Stokes; Sharon Barnes; Laythan Armour | —N/a | 1986 | |
| "Step by Step" † | Whitney Houston | Annie Lennox | The Preacher's Wife | 1996 | |
| "Takin' a Chance" † | Whitney Houston | Whitney Houston ‡ Benjamin Winans; Keith Thomas | I'm Your Baby Tonight (Japanese edition) | 1990 | |
| "Take Good Care of My Heart" | Jermaine Jackson and Whitney Houston | Peter McCann; Steve Dorff | Jermaine Jackson and Whitney Houston | 1984 | |
| "Take Me to Your Heart" | Whitney Houston | Unknown | Unreleased | 1984 | |
| "Tell Me No" | Whitney Houston | Annie Roboff; Holly Lamar; Kandi Burruss; Kenneth Edmonds | Just Whitney | 2002 | |
| "There's Music in You" | Whitney Houston | Richard Rodgers; Oscar Hammerstein II | —N/a | 1997 | |
| "Things You Say" | Whitney Houston | Charlene Keys; Charlie Bereal; Kenny Bereal; Missy Elliott | Just Whitney | 2002 | |
| "Thinking About You" † | Whitney Houston | Kashif Saleem; La Forrest Cope | Whitney Houston | 1985 | |
| "This Will Be (An Everlasting Love)" (live, 2000) | Whitney Houston and Natalie Cole | Chuck Jackson; Marvin Yancy | Clive Davis: The Soundtrack of Our Lives (Deluxe version) | 2017 | |
| "True Voice" | Whitney Houston | Keith Barnhart; Dwight Batteau Jr. Charles Morrow; Jeffrey Southworth | —N/a | 1994 | |
| "Try It on My Own" † | Whitney Houston | Aleese Simmons; Carole Bayer Sager; Jason Edmonds; Kenneth Edmonds; Nathan Walton | Just Whitney | 2002 | |
| "Unashamed" | Whitney Houston | Darius Good; Luke Paterna; Stephanie Salzman; Troy Taylor | Just Whitney | 2002 | |
| "Until You Come Back" | Whitney Houston | Daryl Simmons; Kenneth Edmonds | My Love Is Your Love | 1998 | |
| "We Didn't Know" † | Whitney Houston and Stevie Wonder | Stevie Wonder | I'm Your Baby Tonight | 1990 | |
| "Whatchulookinat" † | Whitney Houston | Whitney Houston ‡ Michael Andre Lewis; Balewa Muhammad; Chris Stein; Deborah Harry; Harry Palmer; Jesse West; Lawrence Parker; Tammie Harris | Just Whitney | 2002 | |
| "When You Believe" † | Mariah Carey and Whitney Houston | Stephen Schwartz | My Love Is Your Love, #1's and The Prince of Egypt | 1998 | |
| "Where Do Broken Hearts Go" † | Whitney Houston | Chuck Jackson; Frank Wildhorn | Whitney | 1987 | |
| "Where You Are" | Whitney Houston | Dyan Humes; James Calabrese; LeMel Humes | Whitney | 1987 | |
| "Whitney Houston Dub Plate" | Wyclef Jean featuring Whitney Houston | Wyclef Jean; Jerry Duplessis | The Ecleftic: 2 Sides II a Book | 2000 | |
| "Who Do You Love" | Whitney Houston | Hubert Eaves III; Luther Vandross | I'm Your Baby Tonight | 1990 | |
| "Who Would Imagine a King" | Whitney Houston | Hallerin Hilton Hill; Mervyn Warren | The Preacher's Wife | 1996 | |
| "Why Does It Hurt So Bad" † | Whitney Houston | Kenneth Edmonds | Waiting to Exhale | 1995 | |
| "Why Does It Hurt So Bad" (live, 1996) | Whitney Houston | Kenneth Edmonds | B-side to "Why Does It Hurt So Bad" | 1996 | |
| "Worth It" | Whitney Houston | Johntá Austin; Eric Hudson | I Look to You | 2009 | |
| "You Give Good Love" † | Whitney Houston | La Forrest Cope | Whitney Houston | 1985 | |
| "You Give Good Love" (live, 1985) | Whitney Houston | La Forrest Cope | Whitney Houston Live: Her Greatest Performances | 2014 | |
| "You Light Up My Life" | Whitney Houston | Joseph Brooks | Just Whitney | 2002 | |
| "You Were Loved" | Whitney Houston | Diane Warren | The Preacher's Wife | 1996 | |
| "You're Still My Man" | Whitney Houston | Gerry Goffin; Michael Masser | Whitney | 1987 | |
| "You'll Never Stand Alone" | Whitney Houston | Diane Warren | My Love Is Your Love | 1998 | |

== See also ==
- Whitney Houston singles discography
