= I Wish You Love: More from The Bodyguard =

Soundtrack album (reissue) by Whitney Houston
- Released: November 17, 2017
- Recorded: 1991–1996
- Genre: R&B; soul; pop; gospel
- Length: 73:01
- Label: Legacy

Whitney Houston chronology
| Whitney Houston Live: Her Greatest Performances (2014) | I Wish You Love: More from The Bodyguard (2017) | I Wanna Dance with Somebody (The Movie: Whitney New, Classic and Reimagined) (2022) |

Professional ratings
Review scores
| Source | Rating |
|---|---|
| SoundPasta | 4/5 stars |

I Wish You Love: More from The Bodyguard is the 25th anniversary reissue of Whitney Houston's soundtrack album The Bodyguard (1992). It was posthumously released on November 17, 2017 by Legacy Recordings.

== Background ==
The album was released to commemorate the 25th anniversary of the movie, The Bodyguard, which marked Houston's film debut. It includes the film versions of her six Bodyguard contributions – "I Will Always Love You," "I Have Nothing," "I'm Every Woman," "Run to You," "Queen of the Night" and "Jesus Loves Me" – as well as remixes and live performances of the songs from The Bodyguard World Tour in 1993–1994.

The album's release coincided with a tribute to Houston and the music of The Bodyguard at the 45th American Music Awards as performed by Christina Aguilera. Ahead of the performance, Aguilera wrote on Instagram, “I am excited, honored and humbled to perform a tribute to one of my idols.”

== Commercial performance ==
After Aguilera's tribute to Houston and the album at American Music Awards, I Wish You Love: More from The Bodyguard debuted at number 165 on the Billboard 200 with 6,000 copies sold the week of December 9, 2017, it also debuted at numbers 9, 22 and 61 on the Soundtracks, Top R&B Albums and Top Album Sales charts, respectively. It also peaked at number 133 in Belgium on November 25, 2017.

== Track listing ==
I Wish You Love: More from The Bodyguard – Standard edition
| No. | Title | Writer(s) | Producer(s) | Length |
|---|---|---|---|---|
| 1. | "I Will Always Love You" (Alternate Mix) | Parton | Foster | 5:03 |
| 2. | "I Have Nothing" (Film Version) | Foster; Thompson | Foster | 4:56 |
| 3. | "I'm Every Woman" (Clivilles & Cole House Mix I Edit) | Ashford; Simpson | Walden; Clivillés; Cole | 5:42 |
| 4. | "Run to You" (Film Version) | Rich; Friedman | Foster | 4:18 |
| 5. | "Queen of the Night" (Film Version) | Reid; Edmonds; Simmons; Houston | L.A. Reid; Babyface | 3:15 |
| 6. | "Jesus Loves Me" (Film Version) | Warner; Bradbury | Winans; Houston | 1:07 |
| 7. | "Jesus Loves Me" (A Capella Version) | Warner; Bradbury | Winans; Houston | 4:52 |
| 8. | "I Will Always Love You" (Film Version) | Parton | Foster | 4:34 |
| 9. | "I Have Nothing" (Live from Brunei) | Foster; Thompson | Foster | 6:52 |
| 10. | "Run to You" (Live from The Bodyguard Tour) | Rich; Friedman | Foster | 4:46 |
| 11. | "Jesus Loves Me" / "He's Got the Whole World in His Hands" (Live from The Bodyguard Tour) | Warner; Bradbury | Winans; Houston | 10:38 |
| 12. | "Queen of the Night" (Live from The Bodyguard Tour) | Reid; Edmonds; Simmons; Houston | L.A. Reid; Babyface | 5:35 |
| 13. | "I Will Always Love You" (Live from The Bodyguard Tour) | Parton | Foster | 6:15 |
| 14. | "I'm Every Woman" (Live from The Bodyguard Tour) | Ashford; Simpson | Walden; Clivillés; Cole | 5:07 |

== Personnel ==
"I Will Always Love You" (Alternate Mix)

- Whitney Houston – vocals, vocal arrangement
- David Foster – producer, arranger, keyboard
- Rickey Minor – director
- Kirk Whalum – saxophone solo
- Ricky Lawson – drums
- Dean Parks, Michael Landau – guitars

"I Have Nothing" (Film Version)

- Whitney Houston – vocals
- David Foster – keyboards, bass, string arrangement, producer, arranger
- Michael Landau – guitar

"I'm Every Woman" (Clivilles & Cole House Mix I Edit)

- Whitney Houston – vocals
- Narada Michael Walden – producer
- Robert Clivilles – additional vocal arrangement and production, remix
- David Cole – additional vocal arrangement and production, remix
- Vocal arrangement inspired by Chaka Khan

"Run to You" (Film Version)

- Whitney Houston – vocals
- David Foster – producer, arrangement, string arrangement, bass
- Jud Friedman – arrangement, keyboards
- John Robinson – drums
- Dean Parks – acoustic guitar

"Queen of the Night" (Film Version)

- Whitney Houston – vocals, co-producer, vocal arrangement
- L.A. Reid – producer, drum programming
- Babyface – producer, keyboard, organ, bass and drum programming
- Daryl Simmons – co-producer

"Jesus Loves Me" (Film Version)

- Whitney Houston, Michele Lamar Richards – vocals

"Jesus Loves Me" (A Capella Version)

- Whitney Houston – vocals, vocal arrangement
- BeBe Winans – vocal arrangement, arrangement
- Cedric J. Caldwell – arrangement

"I Will Always Love You" (Film Version)

"I Have Nothing" (Live)

- Recording Date: August 24, 1996
- Recording Location: Jerudong Park Amphitheatre, Bandar Seri Begawan, Brunei

"Run to You" (Live)

- Recording Date: September 27, 1994
- Recording Location: Radio City Music Hall, New York City

"Jesus Loves Me" / "He's Got the Whole World in His Hands" (Live)

- Recording Date: April 17, 1994
- Recording Location: Estadio Vélez Sarsfield, Buenos Aires, Argentina

"Queen of the Night" (Live)

- Recording Date: June 23, 1994
- Recording Location: The Spectrum, Philadelphia, Pennsylvania

"I Will Always Love You" (Live)

- Recording Date: November 5, 1993
- Recording Location: Earls Court Exhibition Centre, London, England

"I'm Every Woman" (Live)

- Recording Date: October 14, 1993
- Recording Location: Deutschlandhalle, Berlin, Germany

The Bodyguard World Tour 1993-1994: Band

- Musicians – Rickey Minor, Paul Jackson Jr., Michael Baker, Wayne Linsey
  Bette Sussman, Bashiri Johnson, Freddie Washington, Carlos Rios
  Gerald Albright, Gary Bias, Kirk Whalum
- Vocals – Gary Houston, Alfie Silas, Pattie Howard, Della Miles, Olivia McClurkin

=== Production and design ===
- Jeffrey James and Lisa Del Greco – Legacy Recordings A&R
- Tina Ibanez – art direction, design
- Will McKinney – project direction
- Gretchen Brennison – product direction
- Mark Wilder – mastering
- Vic Anesini, Sean Brennan, Maria Triana – audio engineer
- Bill Hedgcock, John Chester, Jamie Howarth – audio engineer

Credits taken from album liner notes

== Charts ==
Chart performance for I Wish You Love: More from The Bodyguard
| Chart (2017–2018) | Peak position |
|---|---|
| Belgian Albums (Ultratop Flanders) | 133 |
| Belgian Albums (Ultratop Wallonia) | 198 |
| South Korean International Albums (Circle) | 9 |
| US Billboard 200 | 165 |
| US Top R&B Albums (Billboard) | 22 |
| US Soundtrack Albums (Billboard) | 9 |
