= Queen of the Night (song) =

1993 single by Whitney Houston

Single by Whitney Houston

from the album The Bodyguard: Original Soundtrack Album
- Released: October 12, 1993
- Recorded: November 9, 1991
- Studio: Larrabee Sound (West Hollywood, California)
- Genre: Hard rock; R&B; funk; house
- Length: 3:06 (album version); 3:21 (CJ's single edit)
- Label: Arista
- Songwriters: Whitney Houston; Babyface; Daryl Simmons; L.A. Reid
- Producers: L.A. Reid; Babyface; Daryl Simmons; Whitney Houston

Whitney Houston singles chronology
"Run to You" (1993)	"Queen of the Night" (1993)	"Something in Common" (1993)

Music video
- "Queen of the Night" on YouTube

"Queen of the Night" is a song co-written by American singer and actress Whitney Houston along with L.A. Reid, Babyface and Daryl Simmons. Produced by Reid and Babyface along with Simmons and Houston and performed by Houston, it was released on October 12, 1993 by Arista Records as the fifth and final single from the soundtrack album The Bodyguard (1992), and is played during the closing credits of the film of the same name.

The song was an uptempo hard rock number in which Houston expresses how she "rules the club scene" as the self-proclaimed "queen of the night". It was the fifth and last single released from the soundtrack. In the US, it was released as a radio-only single and the song became a top 40 hit on several Billboard airplay charts in early 1994. A house remix version by British remixer C.J. Mackintosh helped Houston earn her fifth number one single on the Billboard Hot Dance Club Songs chart.

It entered the top 40 in several countries such as Canada, Switzerland, Ireland and the Netherlands while finding its biggest success on the charts in Portugal, Iceland, Belgium and the UK, where it landed inside the top 20.

== Background and development ==
Houston and the duo of Babyface and L.A. Reid began working together for the former's album, I'm Your Baby Tonight in March 1990. At the time, Houston had been accused of having her music catering to white audiences and her label Arista hired the duo to silence critics.

The album became a hit and the title track became the duo's first number one single on the Billboard Hot 100. The duo would have two more hits with Houston on the album including the soul ballad "Miracle" and "My Name Is Not Susan". It would start a lifelong collaboration and friendship between the three.

In April 1991, Houston announced that she would begin filming her debut leading role as Rachel Marron in The Bodyguard. After Clive Davis complained of the film not having accompanying music to explain Houston's role as a temperamental, talented diva being protected by a bodyguard she ends up falling in love with, Houston signed a deal to produce her first soundtrack album, agreeing to record the majority of the songs.

The soundtrack would be Houston's second as executive producer. Maureen Crowe was hired as the film's musical supervisor. Houston, who was attaining more control of her career after years of being guided and mentored by Davis, chose Babyface to contribute to the soundtrack.

== Recording and composition ==
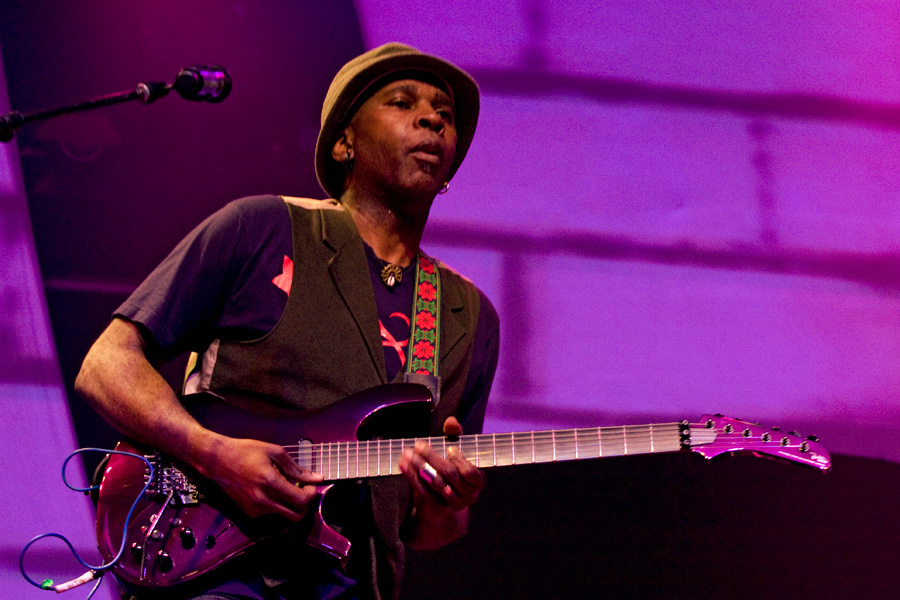
Vernon Reid of Living Colour contributed the guitar solo in the song.

On November 9, 1991, weeks before filming commenced in Hollywood, Houston entered Larrabee Sound there to record the song. Babyface and frequent collaborator Daryl Simmons had been busy at work on the soundtrack to the Eddie Murphy vehicle, Boomerang, which led to delays in production on Houston's song.

According to Daryl Simmons, Kevin Costner suggested them to write the song giving them the title "Queen of the Night" but they were stuck on what to do with the song. In their insistence, Houston helped out with the lyrics, musical composition and arrangement of the song.

Said Crowe, "She felt like they had limited time and they wanted to make sure they were writing something she was comfortable with." Crowe continued: "she had been working on her character, so they wanted her to come in, ‘we’ll hammer this out together,’ with the idea of getting the rhythm right, the attitude right."

Reid, who was now busy as president of his and Babyface's record label LaFace and hadn't been musically active since the label began publishing records, became a fourth collaborator after suggesting a drum intro be used.

It would be the first song to be recorded for the soundtrack. The song played a pivotal role in the film where Houston, as Rachel Marron, performs the song at a rowdy dance nightclub (the Mayan Theater in Los Angeles) before audience members grabbed her offstage, causing a near-riot before she's saved by co-star Kevin Costner's character, bodyguard Frank Farmer.

The original soundtrack version of "Queen of the Night" is a hard rock and R&B song with funk, glam metal and new jack swing elements. It has a medium rock tempo with a time signature of 4/4 common time and 106 beats per minute and plays in the key of A major.

Part of the chorus was inspired by Michael Jackson's 1987 song "Dirty Diana". Vernon Reid of the heavy metal band Living Colour contributed a guitar solo. Houston contributed both lead and background vocals.

Later, Arista sent house music remixes of the song, mainly from British remixer C.J. Mackintosh, which was released to nightclubs and radio. Much like the original, the song starts in the key of A major and has a dance beat of 120 beats per minute.

== Critical reception ==
A reviewer from AllMusic complimented "Queen of the Night" as "a first-rate urban pop song that skillfully captures Houston at her best." Larry Flick from Billboard magazine commented, "If anyone can successfully bring house music back to pop radio, it's Houston", describing it as "a wickedly catchy ditty, armed with a chorus that will stick in your mind like sinfully sweet brain candy." Troy J. Augusto from Cash Box named it Pick of the Week, writing that "it's actually one of Houston's least impressive single releases—but its aggressive vocal delivery and En Vogue-like flow will probably make for another chart-topper." A reviewer from CD Universe felt that Houston "continues to mine her rich vein of ornate balladry and pop-flavored dance workouts, [like] on her own 'Queen of the Night,' with its percolating upbeat production a la L.A. Reid & Babyface." Houston biographer Ted Cox called the song a "thumping metallic funk number" that he described as "uncharacteristic for Whitney, but perfectly fitting with Rachel [Marron], her character in [The Bodyguard]." He further wrote that the song "gives the impression that Whitney was letting a little of her 'raunchy' side show under the guise of playing a part."

Chris Willman of the L.A. Times assessed the song negatively, "The only obvious dud (on the album) is 'Queen of the Night,' a silly stab at hard-rock that's almost a dead ringer for En Vogue's "Free Your Mind", particularly where her vocals are multi tracked." Howard Cohen from The Miami Herald said the singer "slips into a downright funky mode on the R&B workout". Dave Piccioni from Music Week's RM Dance Update stated that Houston "returns to the pure house sound with this wonderful CJ Mackintosh collaboration", remarking that she "is in as full vocal form as ever and the gospelled vocal harmonies are sweet and strong." Another RM editor, James Hamilton, called it a "CJ Mackintosh remixed pleasant but bland jiggly garage-style loper". Stephen Holden from The New York Times deemed it a "run-of-the-mill dance tune". Popdose compared its production to Janet Jackson's "Black Cat". Arion Berger from Rolling Stone said that "on "Queen of the Night", L.A. and Babyface start out stomping and never stop, letting Houston belt riotously along until she drops or they do. (They do.)" USA Today writer James T. Jones IV described it as a surprise, "rocking" tune. James Hunter from Vibe noted that it lets the remixer replace the producer's "guitar slams with snare-happy waves of glowing rhythm that add up to disco for a generation that's unsure whether disco is nostalgic or eternal."

== Chart performance ==
The song was released to US as an airplay-only single in November 1993. Due to Billboard's charting requirements at that time, singles without a commercial release were ineligible to chart on the Billboard Hot 100.

Despite this, the single still found success on several Billboard component charts. The original version peaked at number 17 on the Billboard Top 40/Mainstream chart and number 36 on the Billboard Hot 100 Airplay chart. It found more modest success on the Hot R&B Airplay chart where it peaked at number 47 and stayed on the chart for 11 weeks.

In January 1994, the C.J. Mackintosh remix topped the Billboard Hot Dance Club Play chart, becoming Houston's fifth number-one dance single and her first Billboard chart-topper as a songwriter and producer.

The single was released to several other countries. In Canada, it peaked at number 39. In the UK, it peaked at number 14 on its singles chart, and numbers nine and four on the Music Week dance singles and airplay charts. It also reached the top 20 in Belgium and Iceland and was a top ten single in Portugal.

It also placed in the top 40 in the Netherlands, Switzerland and Ireland and had more modest success in Germany, France and Australia. It peaked at number 33 on the Eurochart Hot 100.

== Music video ==
The accompanying music video for "Queen of the Night", directed by English film director and television producer Mick Jackson, features the full performance Houston gives in the motion picture The Bodyguard, which is interrupted by violence in the film.

In the Mayan Theatre performance portion of the music video, Houston continues dancing with members of the audience who joins her onstage throughout the song. The video features footage from the 1927 film Metropolis. Houston appears in the Metropolis influenced portion in the video wearing gray metallic gear included a metallic headpiece. Both outfits were designed for her by the film's costume designer Susan Niniger.

Since being uploaded to Houston's YouTube channel, the video has been viewed over 22 million times on the platform, with its views paling in comparison to her four previous videos from the soundtrack, all of which accumulated 100 million or more views with two of them – "I Will Always Love You" and "I Have Nothing" – accumulating over a billion views each.

== Live performances ==
During the Bodyguard World Tour (1993-1994), Houston's band would start the song off with the hard rock original while Houston was in intermission before she'd return to the stage.

Houston would sing the original before she reappeared onstage and then the band would launch into the funk-inspired Mackintosh remix version.

At the 1994 Soul Train Music Awards, Houston would play bits of the hard rock version of the song before launching into "I'm Every Woman" when she showed up onstage.

For the taped shows in South America -- such as Rio de Janeiro, Santiago, Buenos Aires and Caracas, Houston performed both the hard rock and funk versions and would do the same in Johannesburg on November 12, 1994 for the HBO-TV South Africa concert special.

A June 23, 1994 performance of the song at The Spectrum in Philadelphia was included in the soundtrack reissue, I Wish You Love: More from The Bodyguard, in November 2017.

== Legacy ==
=== Covers and usage in popular culture ===
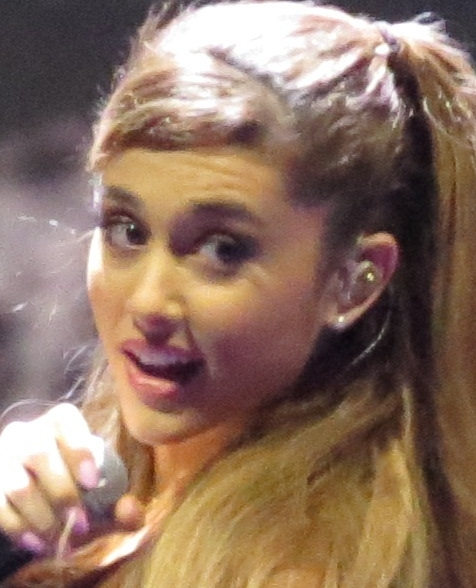
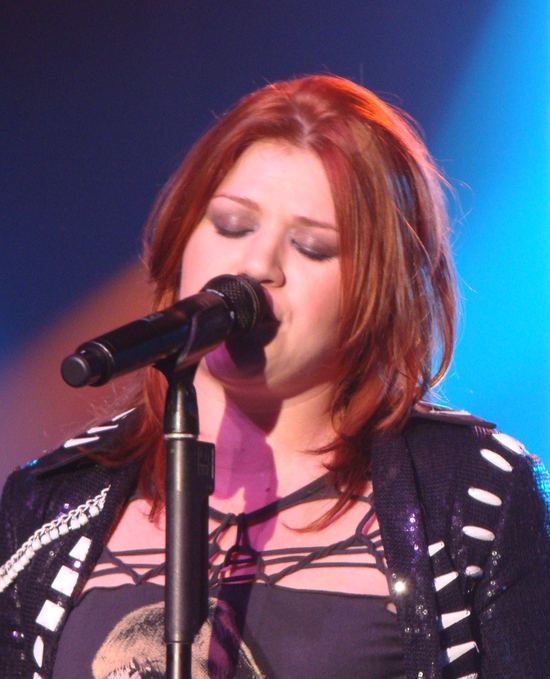
Singers Ariana Grande and Kelly Clarkson have covered "Queen of the Night" on television.

Since its release, the song has been covered numerous times over the years by various artists. In 1993, Chinese-Canadian singer Sally Yeh covered it for her album, 與你又過一天 Another Day With You. In 2006, it was covered by American Idol contestant Haley Scarnato. It was also covered by Australian singer Delta Goodrem during her Believe Again Tour at various locations throughout Australia in 2009.

The 2009 X Factor contestants also performed this song on Sunday, October 18, 2009, as a group performance. Contestant Stacey Solomon, who came third, performed this song on The X Factor Live Tour 2010. The independent, web-based, electronic/dubstep artist known as Futret released a remix/crossover-cover of the song in early February 2012.

The song is also mentioned in the show Bob's Burgers, the episode "O.T.: The Outside Toilet" in which the character Gene talks to an expensive talking toilet, who can answer any of your questions. Gene asks "Who is the queen of the night?" and the toilet responds saying "Whitney Houston." The song was covered by Monika Linkytė in week two of "Eurovizijos" dainų konkurso nacionalinė atranka.

Ariana Grande performed the dance remix version of the song and "How Will I Know" as a tribute to Houston in the ABC series finale of Greatest Hits. Madame Tussauds Hollywood's wax figure of Houston depicts her performance of the song in The Bodyguard.

Singer Kelly Clarkson recorded covers of "Queen of the Night" on two occasions: the first was on Clarkson's original demo tape recorded in 2001, while the second was for the album, Kellyoke.

=== Polls, rankings and retrospectives ===
In its 1994 year-end list, the C.J. Mackintosh house remix was the 38th best performing single of the year on the Billboard Dance Club Songs chart.

BET ranked the song 40th place in their list of the forty best Whitney Houston songs, writing that Houston "returned to her sassy mid-80s form with this rocked-out En Vogue-esque scorcher".

Rob Sheffield of Rolling Stone wrote of the song in his 2012 write-up of his favorite Houston songs, "This isn’t one of her more famous songs, but it’s a special fan favorite – Whitney goes glam-metal. It’s the only time she sounded like a big Ziggy Stardust fan, but maybe once was enough." Classic Pop described the song as "a funk-filled floorfiller".

In their retrospective appraisal of the soundtrack, BuzzFeed News stated that, thanks to Houston's compositional and production input in the song, "'Queen of the Night' became a high-energy, drum-centric, pop-rock showpiece, with Tina Turner–esque growling, that showed a different side of her persona," calling her lyrics in the song "her most in-your-face yet."

== Track listings and formats ==
- Japanese CD single
1. "Queen of the Night" (CJ's Single Edit) – 3:21
2. "Queen of the Night" (Album Version) – 3:06
- UK CD maxi-single
1. "Queen of the Night" (CJ's Single Edit) – 3:21
2. "Queen of the Night" (CJ's Master Mix) – 6:35
3. "Queen of the Night" (CJ's Instrumental Mix) – 9:35
4. "Queen of the Night" (Mackapella Mix) – 5:21
5. "Queen of the Night" (Dub of the Night) – 5:21
- UK cassette single
1. "Queen of the Night" (CJ's Single Edit) – 3:13
2. "Queen of the Night" (Album Version) – 3:06

== Personnel ==
- Whitney Houston – vocals, songwriting, producer, vocal arrangement
- L.A. Reid – songwriting, producer, drum programming
- Babyface – songwriting, producer, keyboard, organ, bass and drum programming
- Daryl Simmons – songwriting, co-producer
- Kayo – bass
- Donald Parks – programming
- Randy Walker – programming
- Vernon Reid – guitar solo
- Barney Perkins – recording engineer
- Milton Chan – recording engineer
- Dave Way – mixing engineer
- Jim "Z" Zumpano – mixing engineer

== Charts ==
=== Weekly charts ===
Chart (1993–1994)	Peak position
Australia (ARIA)	88
Belgium (Ultratop 50 Flanders)	20
Canada Top Singles (RPM)	39
Canada Adult Contemporary (RPM)	4
Canada Contemporary Hit Radio (The Record)	36
Europe (Eurochart Hot 100)	33
Europe (European Hit Radio)	14
France (SNEP)	47
Germany (GfK)	64
Iceland (Íslenski Listinn Topp 40)	18
Ireland (IRMA)	26
Israel (Israeli Singles Chart)	19
Netherlands (Dutch Top 40)	21
Netherlands (Single Top 100)	21
Portugal (AFP)	7
Switzerland (Schweizer Hitparade)	36
UK Singles (Official Charts)	14
UK Airplay (Music Week)	4
UK Dance (Music Week)	9
UK Club Chart (Music Week)	12
US Dance Club Songs (Billboard)	1
US R&B/Hip-Hop Airplay (Billboard)	47
US Radio Songs (Billboard)	36

=== Year-end charts ===
Chart (1994)	Position
US Hot Dance Club Play (Billboard)	38

== Release history ==
Region	Date	Format(s)	Label(s)	Ref.
United Kingdom	October 1993	—N/a	Arista	
Australia	November 15, 1993	12-inch vinyl; CD; cassette	Arista	
Japan	December 16, 1993	Mini-CD	Arista	

== See also ==
- List of number-one dance hits (United States)
- List of Billboard number-one dance singles of 1994

== Bibliography ==
- Cox, Ted (1997). Whitney Houston: Black Americans of Achievement. Chelsea House Publishers. ISBN 0-7910-4456-4.
