= The Bodyguard World Tour =

1993–94 concert tour by Whitney Houston

- Tour by Whitney Houston
- Promotional poster for tour
- Associated album: The Bodyguard
- Start date: July 5, 1993
- End date: November 19, 1994
- Legs: 8
- No. of shows: 58 in North America; 16 in Asia; 36 in Europe; 7 in South America; 3 in Africa in total 120
- Box office: $35 million ($1,858.78 in 2025 dollars) $14 million ($31.2 in 2025 dollars) (North America only)

Whitney Houston concert chronology
- I'm Your Baby Tonight World Tour (1991); The Bodyguard World Tour (1993–94); Whitney: Brunei The Royal Wedding Celebration (1996)

The Bodyguard World Tour was the fourth world concert tour by American singer and actress Whitney Houston, in support of her hit soundtrack album for her first film, The Bodyguard.

Spanning seventeen months between July 1993 and November 1994, Houston performed 120 shows in five continents and were her first stops in South America and Africa, the latter stops, in South Africa, helped Houston make history as the first international artist to headline a concert tour in the country following the end of apartheid in the country and the election win of President Nelson Mandela.

== Overview ==
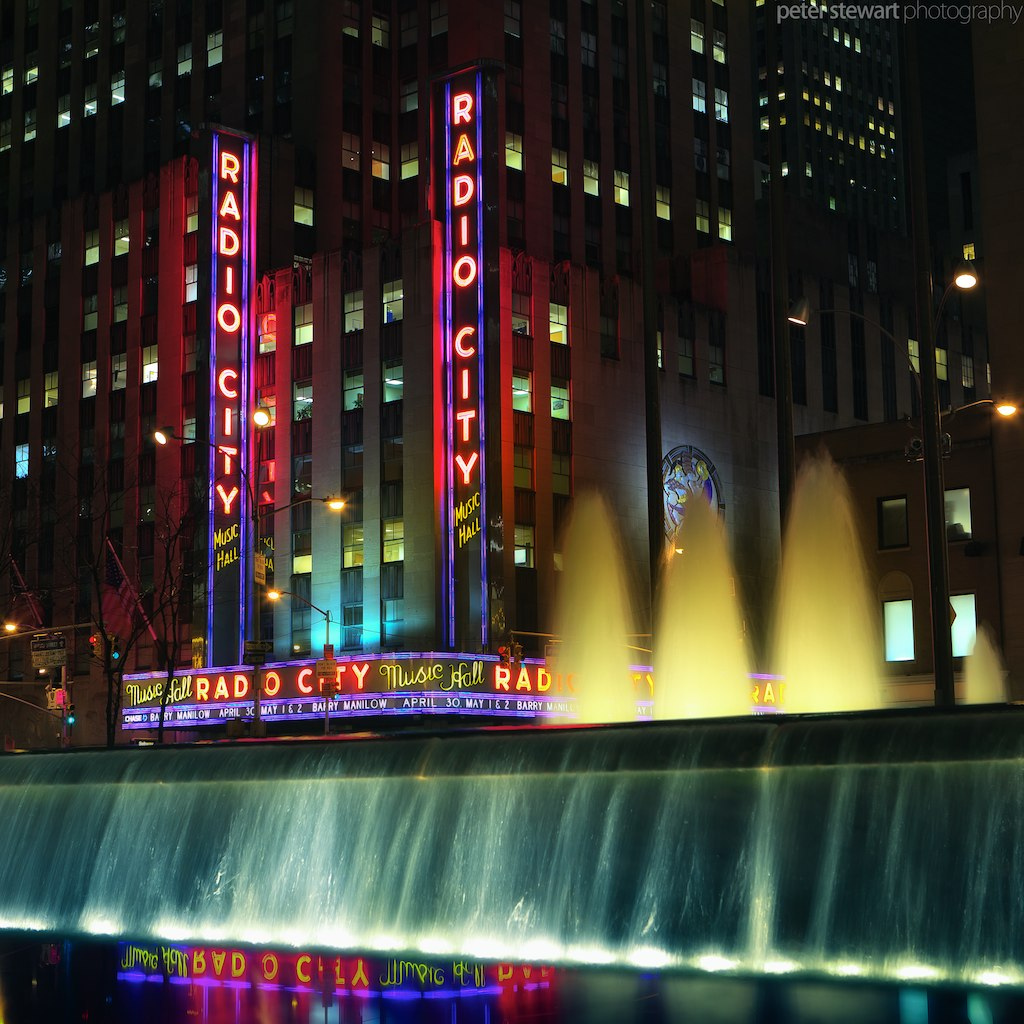
The Radio City Music Hall in New York City, New York became one of the most frequent venues on Houston's The Bodyguard World Tour, where she would perform 12 sold-out shows throughout the tour's tenure.

Despite marrying singer Bobby Brown in July 1992 and giving birth to their only child, Bobbi Kristina Brown the following March, Houston found herself in demand following the enormous success of both the film and soundtrack to The Bodyguard. Rehearsals for the tour began in May. Since Houston had just delivered a child, the initial plan was to perform smaller venues such as halls and theaters rather than the larger venues that Houston had done throughout her career at that time. Houston told the press that she wanted to perform at more intimate settings.

Houston launched the tour at the James L. Knight Center Theater in Miami, Florida on July 5, 1993. Houston received a lot of flak during that show for showing up late and then telling a fan who wanted an autograph to sit down; however the show was still a resounding success after the singer calmed things down. Houston played five consecutive sold-out nights at Radio City Music Hall in New York City, and then played six nights at the Sands Hotel & Casino in Atlantic City. Despite the initial success of smaller venues, which Houston added dates due to initial dates quickly selling out, Houston continued performing at bigger venues including the Hollywood Bowl in Los Angeles.

During the first US leg, Houston took a break to fly over to Europe to accompany husband Bobby Brown on his tour. Gospel act Angie & Debbie Winans were the opening act for the 1993 US leg. Houston continued the tour in Europe where, unlike the United States, Houston would perform at stadiums and arenas. After booking her UK tours in the past at London's Wembley Arena, Houston instead performed at the much larger Earls Court Exhibition Centre for this tour.

The tour became her first stop in South America during January 1994, which launched at the Estádio do Morumbi in São Paulo, Brazil. Houston then performed at the Praça da Apoteose in Rio de Janeiro on January 23. After Houston returned to the United States where she would win multiple awards for the soundtrack including the Grammy Award for Album of the Year, the singer returned to South America for sold-out stadium shows in Argentina, Chile and Venezuela in April. During the second North American leg in 1994, Houston performed at the opening ceremony of the 1994 FIFA World Cup at the Rose Bowl Stadium in front of over 92,000, her largest audience to date. Unlike the previous year, Houston performed at larger venues due to popular demand. During that time, the singer had throat ailments and had to cancel eight shows during that time, all of which were rescheduled a month later. Houston also went public concerning having a miscarriage during the tour.

Initially, Houston wanted to end the tour at Radio City Music Hall in September 1994, where she performed seven sold-out shows. However, after Nelson Mandela won the presidential election in South Africa, Houston agreed to headline a state dinner at the White House in October and announced three shows in South Africa, which had also recently outlawed apartheid in March of that year. In doing the South African shows in November, Houston made history as the first international artist to perform at the country after the end of apartheid. Two of the shows in Durban's Kings Park Stadium and Johannesburg's Ellis Park Stadium were taped, with the latter becoming Houston's second HBO concert special, Whitney: The Concert for a New South Africa. The tour would end altogether at the Cape Town Stadium in Cape Town on November 19. The tour was a huge success. Many shows were among the highest grossing shows of their week. The grossings helped Houston make Forbes magazine's Richest Entertainers list. Houston earned over $33 million during 1993 and 1994, the third highest for a female entertainer.

== Critical reception ==
During her first Radio City Music Hall performance in New York City, Stephen Holden of the New York Times wrote that "her stylistic trademarks -- shivery melismas that ripple up in the middle of a song, twirling embellishments at the ends of phrases that suggest an almost breathless exhilaration -- infuse her interpretations with flashes of musical and emotional lightning." At one of her Atlantic City dates, Kevin L. Carter of the Philadelphia Inquirer wrote that Houston handled her songs "with subdued emotionalism and the intelligence that only a gifted musician can bring to a song.

"Saving All My Love for You" was turned into a "smoky saloon-style ballad". Many critics noted that the highlight of the show was when Houston took on "And I Am Telling You" from Dreamgirls, and "I Loves You Porgy" from Porgy and Bess. Stephen Holden wrote of the medley that "her voice conveyed authority, power, determination and just enough vulnerability to give a sense of dramatic intention". As always, Houston included gospel songs. She introduced her band while performing 'Revelation.' Houston spoke about the Lord before going into 'Jesus Loves Me' which was often accompanied with complete silence from the mesmerized crowd." During the last couple of years, since her marriage to Brown, the tabloids generated many stories about Houston and Brown. The New York Post created a rumor that the singer had overdosed on diet pills, leading to a lawsuit filed by Houston. During her shows, while performing her love medley, Houston often denied tabloid rumors. Houston often brought her husband and baby to the stage with her to prove they were a happy family and that the tabloids were wrong.

Many critics felt that these tabloid stories helped her sing with more conviction and emotion. According to some critics, Brown's presence made "All the Man That I Need" a more stirring performance leading up the emotional high of "I Have Nothing", while others felt they were unnecessary, cheesy moments. Many critics praised her Aretha Franklin medley that she performed at certain shows. Houston performed "Ain't No Way", "(You Make Me Feel Like A) Natural Woman" and "Do Right Woman, Do Right Man". According to Jon Beam of the Minneapolis Star Tribune, the Aretha Franklin medley was a triumph of substance over style. He wrote that "She seemed a natural instead of a studied singer doing "A Natural Woman", and "Do Right Woman" was a right-on, soulful country-blues song, with a traditional call-and-response between Houston and her backup singers."

During Houston's performance at the Pond in Anaheim, Chris William of the Los Angeles Times wrote that, "she approached sheer vocal perfection at virtually every turn". And noted that, "she got to apply that astonishing instrument to some material worthy of it. Watching her progress emotionally through a gospel standard or great ‘60s R&B; ballad made it all the more difficult to see Houston go back and end the show as she began it" Houston returned a year later at Radio City Music Hall, opening a seven-night sold-out engagement in September 1994. Jon Pareles of the New York Times reports, "Houston belted ballads, predictably bringing down the house with songs that moved from aching verses to surging choruses. A medley of hits from Dionne Warwick, Ms. Houston's cousin, lacked Ms. Warwick's lightness, but Ms. Houston made "Alfie" sound like the ethical wrangle it is". Ira Robbins of Newsday wrote, "Houston peaked in the Warwick segment with marvelous adaptions of "I Say a Little Prayer" and "Alfie", and "after the powerful one-two of "I Have Nothing" and a rendition of "Run to You" so compelling it would have been no shock to see Kevin Costner jog out".

== Opening acts ==
- Smoothe Sylk (North America—Leg 3)
- Angie & Debbie (Miami, Vienna, Mansfield, New York City, Los Angeles, Cerritos)
- Jay Johnson (Atlantic City—July 1993)
- E.Y.C. (Heerenveen, Maastricht)

== Setlist ==
July 1993 - April 1994
1. "Greatest Love of All" (intro)
2. "Love Will Save the Day"
3. "Saving All My Love for You"
4. "You Give Good Love"
5. "How Will I Know"
6. "I Wanna Dance with Somebody (Who Loves Me)"
7. "I Loves You Porgy" / "And I Am Telling You I'm Not Going"
8. "I Have Nothing"
9. "Queen of the Night"
10. "I'm Your Baby Tonight"
11. "All at Once" / "Nobody Loves Me Like You Do" / "Didn't We Almost Have It All" / "Where Do Broken Hearts Go" / "All the Man That I Need"
12. "Revelation" (contain elements of "He's Alright" and "The Love You Save")
13. "Jesus Loves Me" (contain elements of "He's Got the Whole World in His Hands")
14. "I Will Always Love You"
15. "I'm Every Woman"
June 1994 - September 1994
1. "Greatest Love of All" (intro)
2. "So Emotional"
3. "Saving All My Love for You"
4. "I Wanna Dance With Somebody (Who Loves Me)"
5. "How Will I Know"
6. "All At Once" / "Nobody Loves Me Like You Do" / "Didn't We Almost Have It All" / "Where Do Broken Hearts Go" / "All the Man That I Need"
7. "I Have Nothing"
8. "Queen of the Night"
9. "(You Make Me Feel Like A) Natural Woman" / "Do Right Woman, Do Right Man" / "Ain't No Way"
10. "Wonderful Counselor" (contain elements of "Freeway of Love")
11. "Jesus Loves Me" (contain elements of "He's All Right")
12. "I Will Always Love You"
13. "I'm Every Woman"
November 1994

South Africa

1. "Love's in Need of Love Today"
2. "So Emotional"
3. "Love Will Save The Day" (Durban date only)
4. "Saving All My Love for You"
5. "I Wanna Dance with Somebody (Who Loves Me)"
6. "How Will I Know"
7. "All at Once" / "Where You Are" / "Lover for Life"
8. "My Name Is Not Susan"
9. "Queen of the Night"
10. "I Have Nothing"
11. "Touch the World" (performed with Cissy Houston and Tu Nokwe's Amajika Performing Arts choir)
12. "Love Is"
13. "Amazing Grace"
14. "Master Blaster (Jammin')"
15. "I Will Always Love You"
16. "I'm Every Woman"
17. "Greatest Love of All"
18. "Home"

Notes

- On select dates, from July 1993 to September 1994, Houston closed the show with a duet of "Something in Common" with Bobby Brown.
- In North America and Europe, "My Name Is Not Susan" was performed on select dates. "You Give Good Love" was performed on select dates in Europe and Japan.
- During the show on July 30, 1993 in Atlantic City, Houston performed "Stormy Weather" as a tribute to Lena Horne.
- On November 5 and 7, 1993, January 18, August 14, September 16, 27 and 28, 1994: Houston performed "Run to You" followed by "I Have Nothing".
- During two concerts in Brazil on January 18, and 23, Houston brought Bobby Brown onstage and sang "(You Make Me Feel Like) A Natural Woman" to him. Houston also performed a encore of "Greatest Love of All".
- The New York City concerts in September 1994, Houston performed a medley of Walk On By", "A House Is Not a Home" and "Alfie", also select dates included a performance of "I'm Your Baby Tonight". On September 16, Houston closed the show with "Greatest Love of All".
- The final show on September 30, 1994 in North America, Houston performed "You Are So Beautiful", "For the Love of You", "Amazing Grace" and closed the show with "I Will Always Love You".
- Houston altered her South Africa set specifically for the HBO televised show in Johannesburg on November 12, removing "Nobody Loves Me Like You Do", "Didn't We Almost Have It All" and "Where Do Broken Hearts Go". During the show in Cape Town on November 19, 1994, Houston performed "All the Man That I Need" and "Wonderful Counselor".

== Shows ==
List of concerts, showing date, city, country, venue, tickets sold, number of available tickets and amount of gross revenue
Date	City	Country	Venue	Attendance	Revenue
North America—Leg 1
July 5, 1993	Miami	United States	James L. Knight Center	14,200 / 14,200	$491,150
July 6, 1993	Miami	United States	James L. Knight Center	14,200 / 14,200	$491,150
July 8, 1993	Miami	United States	James L. Knight Center	14,200 / 14,200	$491,150
July 11, 1993	Vienna	United States	Filene Center	14,170 / 14,170	$360,160
July 12, 1993	Vienna	United States	Filene Center	14,170 / 14,170	$360,160
July 14, 1993	Mansfield	United States	Great Woods Center for the Performing Arts	19,000 / 19,900	$995,000
July 15, 1993	Mansfield	United States	Great Woods Center for the Performing Arts	19,000 / 19,900	$995,000
July 20, 1993	New York City	United States	Radio City Music Hall	28,720 / 28,720	$1,458,025
July 21, 1993	New York City	United States	Radio City Music Hall	28,720 / 28,720	$1,458,025
July 23, 1993	New York City	United States	Radio City Music Hall	28,720 / 28,720	$1,458,025
July 24, 1993	New York City	United States	Radio City Music Hall	28,720 / 28,720	$1,458,025
July 26, 1993	New York City	United States	Radio City Music Hall	28,720 / 28,720	$1,458,025
July 28, 1993	Atlantic City	United States	Copa Room	12,000 / 12,000	$791,112
July 30, 1993	Atlantic City	United States	Copa Room	12,000 / 12,000	$791,112
July 31, 1993	Atlantic City	United States	Copa Room	12,000 / 12,000	$791,112
August 1, 1993	Atlantic City	United States	Copa Room	12,000 / 12,000	$791,112
August 3, 1993	Atlantic City	United States	Copa Room	12,000 / 12,000	$791,112
August 4, 1993	Atlantic City	United States	Copa Room	12,000 / 12,000	$791,112
Europe
August 13, 1993	Copenhagen	Denmark	Parken Stadium	38,065 / 38,065	$3,806,500
August 15, 1993	Kolding	Denmark	Kolding Stadion	10,000 / 10,000	$855,600
North America
August 22, 1993	Los Angeles	United States	Hollywood Bowl	17,006 / 17,006	$625,030
August 23, 1993^{[A]}	San Diego	United States	Embarcadero Marina Park South	4,567 / 4,700	$392,762
August 25, 1993	Cerritos	United States	Cerritos Center for the Performing Arts	5,163 / 5,163	$473,275
August 27, 1993	Cerritos	United States	Cerritos Center for the Performing Arts	5,163 / 5,163	$473,275
August 28, 1993	Cerritos	United States	Cerritos Center for the Performing Arts	5,163 / 5,163	$473,275
Asia
September 1, 1993	Osaka	Japan	Osaka-jō Hall	31,897 / 32,000	$2,870,730
September 2, 1993	Osaka	Japan	Osaka-jō Hall	31,897 / 32,000	$2,870,730
September 6, 1993	Tokyo	Japan	Nippon Budokan	114,056 / 115,768 (Note: The score data is combined from the shows held at the Tokyo Dome on September 9-14 and 27-28, respectively.)	$8,188,381
September 7, 1993	Tokyo	Japan	Nippon Budokan	114,056 / 115,768	$8,188,381
September 9, 1993	Tokyo	Japan	Nippon Budokan	114,056 / 115,768	$8,188,381
September 10, 1993	Tokyo	Japan	Nippon Budokan	114,056 / 115,768	$8,188,381
September 13, 1993	Tokyo	Japan	Nippon Budokan	114,056 / 115,768	$8,188,381
September 14, 1993	Tokyo	Japan	Nippon Budokan	114,056 / 115,768	$8,188,381
September 16, 1993	Nagoya	Japan	Nagoya Rainbow Hall	10,000 / 10,000	$2,500,000
September 17, 1993	Nagoya	Japan	Nagoya Rainbow Hall	10,000 / 10,000	$2,500,000
September 19, 1993	Yokohama	Japan	Yokohama Arena	51,000 / 51,000 (Note: The score data is combined from the shows held at the Yokohama Arena on September 19-20 and 24, respectively.)	$4,872,710
September 20, 1993	Yokohama	Japan	Yokohama Arena	51,000 / 51,000	$4,872,710
September 22, 1993	Fukuoka	Japan	Fukuoka Dome	38,561 / 38,561	$5,784,150
September 24, 1993	Yokohama	Japan	Yokohama Arena	—	—
September 27, 1993	Tokyo	Japan	Nippon Budokan	—	—
September 28, 1993	Tokyo	Japan	Nippon Budokan	—	—
Europe
October 7, 1993	Milan	Italy	Forum di Assago	—N/a	—N/a
October 8, 1993	Milan	Italy	Forum di Assago	—N/a	—N/a
October 10, 1993	Zürich	Switzerland	Hallenstadion	—N/a	—N/a
October 11, 1993	Zürich	Switzerland	Hallenstadion	—N/a	—N/a
October 13, 1993	Berlin	Germany	Deutschlandhalle	—N/a	—N/a
October 14, 1993	Berlin	Germany	Deutschlandhalle	—N/a	—N/a
October 16, 1993	Stockholm	Sweden	Stockholm Globe Arena	—N/a	—N/a
October 17, 1993	Gothenburg	Sweden	Scandinavium	—N/a	—N/a
October 19, 1993	Oslo	Norway	Oslo Spektrum	—N/a	—N/a
October 22, 1993	Heerenveen	Netherlands	Thialf	—N/a	—N/a
October 23, 1993	Maastricht	Netherlands	MECC Maastricht	—N/a	—N/a
October 25, 1993	Frankfurt	Germany	Festhalle Frankfurt	—N/a	—N/a
October 27, 1993	Birmingham	United Kingdom	NEC Arena	—N/a	—N/a
October 28, 1993	Birmingham	United Kingdom	NEC Arena	—N/a	—N/a
October 30, 1993	Birmingham	United Kingdom	NEC Arena	—N/a	—N/a
October 31, 1993	Sheffield	United Kingdom	Sheffield Arena	—N/a	—N/a
November 2, 1993	Sheffield	United Kingdom	Sheffield Arena	—N/a	—N/a
November 3, 1993	Sheffield	United Kingdom	Sheffield Arena	—N/a	—N/a
November 5, 1993	London	United Kingdom	Earls Court Exhibition Centre	—N/a	—N/a
November 6, 1993	London	United Kingdom	Earls Court Exhibition Centre	—N/a	—N/a
November 7, 1993	London	United Kingdom	Earls Court Exhibition Centre	—N/a	—N/a
November 9, 1993	Dublin	Ireland	Point Theatre	—N/a	—N/a
November 10, 1993	Dublin	Ireland	Point Theatre	—N/a	—N/a
November 12, 1993	Ghent	Belgium	Flanders Expo	—N/a	—N/a
November 15, 1993	Madrid	Spain	Palacio de los Deportes	—N/a	—N/a
November 18, 1993	Metz	France	Galaxie de Metz	—N/a	—N/a
November 19, 1993	Stuttgart	Germany	Hanns-Martin-Schleyer-Halle	—N/a	—N/a
November 21, 1993	Linz	Austria	Linzer Sporthalle	—N/a	—N/a
November 23, 1993	Munich	Germany	Olympiahalle	—N/a	—N/a
November 24, 1993	Dortmund	Germany	Westfalenhalle	—N/a	—N/a
November 26, 1993	Rotterdam	Netherlands	Rotterdam Ahoy Sportpaleis	—N/a	—N/a
November 27, 1993	Rotterdam	Netherlands	Rotterdam Ahoy Sportpaleis	—N/a	—N/a
November 29, 1993	Paris	France	Palais Omnisports de Paris-Bercy	—N/a	—N/a
November 30, 1993	Paris	France	Palais Omnisports de Paris-Bercy	—N/a	—N/a
South America
January 16, 1994^{[B]}	São Paulo	Brazil	Estádio do Morumbi	—N/a	—N/a
January 18, 1994	São Paulo	Brazil	Estádio do Morumbi	—N/a	—N/a
January 23, 1994^{[B]}	Rio de Janeiro	Brazil	Praça da Apoteose	—N/a	—N/a
April 14, 1994	Santiago	Chile	Estadio San Carlos de Apoquindo	—N/a	—N/a
April 16, 1994	Buenos Aires	Argentina	Estadio José Amalfitani	—N/a	—N/a
April 17, 1994	Buenos Aires	Argentina	Estadio José Amalfitani	—N/a	—N/a
April 21, 1994	Caracas	Venezuela	Poliedro de Caracas	—N/a	—N/a
North America
April 24, 1994	San Juan	Puerto Rico	Hiram Bithorn Stadium	14,323 / 20,651	$685,845
June 17, 1994	Hartford	United States	Hartford Civic Center	—N/a	—N/a
June 19, 1994	Uniondale	United States	Nassau Veterans Memorial Coliseum	—N/a	—N/a
June 23, 1994	Philadelphia	United States	The Spectrum	—N/a	—N/a
June 24, 1994	Providence	United States	Providence Civic Center	—N/a	—N/a
June 26, 1994	Richfield	United States	Richfield Coliseum	—N/a	—N/a
June 27, 1994	Auburn Hills	United States	The Palace of Auburn Hills	—N/a	—N/a
June 29, 1994	Fairborn	United States	Nutter Center	—N/a	—N/a
July 1, 1994	Minneapolis	United States	Target Center	12,406 / 14,395	$486,645
July 2, 1994	Rosemont	United States	Rosemont Horizon	—N/a	—N/a
July 5, 1994	Atlanta	United States	Omni Coliseum	—N/a	—N/a
July 7, 1994	Lafayette	United States	Cajundome	—N/a	—N/a
July 11, 1994	Denver	United States	McNichols Sports Arena	—N/a	—N/a
July 13, 1994	Las Cruces	United States	Pan American Center	—N/a	—N/a
August 12, 1994	Las Vegas	United States	MGM Grand Garden Arena	—N/a	—N/a
August 14, 1994	San Jose	United States	San Jose Arena	—N/a	—N/a
August 16, 1994	Portland	United States	Memorial Coliseum	—N/a	—N/a
August 17, 1994	Tacoma	United States	Tacoma Dome	—N/a	—N/a
August 19, 1994	Sacramento	United States	ARCO Arena	—N/a	—N/a
August 21, 1994	Anaheim	United States	Arrowhead Pond of Anaheim	—N/a	—N/a
August 23, 1994	Phoenix	United States	America West Arena	—N/a	—N/a
August 25, 1994	Houston	United States	The Summit	—N/a	—N/a
September 1, 1994	Atlantic City	United States	Copa Room	—N/a	—N/a
September 3, 1994	Atlantic City	United States	Copa Room	—N/a	—N/a
September 4, 1994	Atlantic City	United States	Copa Room	—N/a	—N/a
September 7, 1994	Atlantic City	United States	Copa Room	—N/a	—N/a
September 9, 1994	Atlantic City	United States	Copa Room	—N/a	—N/a
September 10, 1994	Atlantic City	United States	Copa Room	—N/a	—N/a
September 16, 1994	New York City	United States	Radio City Music Hall	39,607 / 39,607	$2,668,940
September 17, 1994	New York City	United States	Radio City Music Hall	39,607 / 39,607	$2,668,940
September 20, 1994	New York City	United States	Radio City Music Hall	39,607 / 39,607	$2,668,940
September 21, 1994	New York City	United States	Radio City Music Hall	39,607 / 39,607	$2,668,940
September 27, 1994	New York City	United States	Radio City Music Hall	39,607 / 39,607	$2,668,940
September 28, 1994	New York City	United States	Radio City Music Hall	39,607 / 39,607	$2,668,940
September 30, 1994	New York City	United States	Radio City Music Hall	39,607 / 39,607	$2,668,940
Africa
November 8, 1994	Durban	South Africa	Kings Park Stadium	—N/a	—N/a
November 12, 1994	Johannesburg	South Africa	Ellis Park Stadium	—N/a	—N/a
November 19, 1994	Cape Town	South Africa	Green Point Stadium	—N/a	—N/a
Total				698,671 / 708,520	$60,000,000

Festivals and other miscellaneous performances
^{A} Summer Pops Series
^{B} Hollywood Rock

Cancellations and rescheduled shows

November 16, 1993	Barcelona, Spain	Palau Sant Jordi	Cancelled
July 8, 1994	Houston, Texas	The Summit	Rescheduled for August 25, 1994
July 15, 1994	San Diego, California	San Diego Sports Arena	Cancelled
July 16, 1994	Anaheim, California	Arrowhead Pond of Anaheim	Rescheduled for August 21, 1994
July 18, 1994	Phoenix, Arizona	America West Arena	Rescheduled for August 23, 1994
July 19, 1994	Las Vegas, Nevada	MGM Grand Garden Arena	Rescheduled for August 12, 1994
July 21, 1994	San Jose, California	San Jose Arena	Rescheduled for August 14, 1994
July 25, 1994	Tacoma, Washington	Tacoma Dome	Rescheduled to August 17, 1994
July 27, 1994	Sacramento, California	ARCO Arena	Rescheduled for August 19, 1994
September 23, 1994	New York City, New York	Radio City Music Hall	Rescheduled to September 28, 1994
September 24, 1994	New York City, New York	Radio City Music Hall	Rescheduled to September 30, 1994

1.:Figures reported for the concerts held in New York City, July 1993.

== Personnel ==
Band:

- Musical director, bass guitar / bass synthesizer – Rickey Minor
- Guitar – Carlos Rios
- Keyboards – Bette Sussman
- Keyboards – Wayne Linsey
- Saxophone/EWI – Kirk Whalum
- Percussion – Bashiri Johnson
- Drums – Michael Baker

Background Vocalists:

- Gary Houston (1st leg only)
- Olivia McClurkin
- Pattie Howard
- Josie James

Tour management:

- Tour manager – Tony Bulluck
- Tour accountant – Wade Perry
- Production manager – Vernon Wilson
- Stage manager – Dewan Mitchell
- Set/Lighting designer – Andy Elias

Crew:

- Front of house sound engineer – George Strakis
- Monitor engineer – Alan Vachon
- Lighting director – Charlie Unkeless
- Lighting crew chief – Roy Jennings
- Vari*Lite programmer/operator – Tom Celner

== Broadcasting and recordings ==
- Houston's November 12, date in Johannesburg, South Africa, was broadcast live on HBO Cable TV, Whitney: The Concert for a New South Africa. The special was later released on home video. There are also televised recordings of her concerts in Argentina, Brazil, and Chile.
- The concerts in Chile, Argentina, Brazil and Venezuela were televised in select countries in South America.
