= I'm Your Baby Tonight (song) =

1990 single by Whitney Houston

Single by Whitney Houston

from the album I'm Your Baby Tonight
- B-side: "Feels So Good"; "I'm Knockin'"
- Released: September 28, 1990
- Studio: Elumba Recording (Hollywood); Axis (New York City)
- Genre: R&B; new jack swing
- Length: 4:59 (album version); 4:13 (album edit)
- Label: Arista
- Songwriters: L.A. Reid; Babyface
- Producers: L.A. Reid; Babyface

Whitney Houston singles chronology
"It Isn't, It Wasn't, It Ain't Never Gonna Be" (1989)	"I'm Your Baby Tonight" (1990)	"All the Man That I Need" (1990)

Music video
- "I'm Your Baby Tonight" on YouTube

"I'm Your Baby Tonight" is a song by American singer Whitney Houston from her third studio album of the same name (1990). Written and produced by L.A. Reid and Babyface, in Australia and most European countries it was released as the album's lead single by Arista Records on September 28, 1990; in the United States, the release date was October 2. Following the release of her second studio album Whitney (1987), Houston became the first woman ever to debut atop the Billboard 200; despite this, critics deemed it safe and formulaic. Additionally, she was booed at the 1989 Soul Train Music Awards and accused of being "not black enough"; Houston decided she needed to change her sound if she wanted to recapture black audiences.

For I'm Your Baby Tonight, Houston chose to work with Reid and Babyface, who had previously produced her then-boyfriend Bobby Brown's 1988 album Don't Be Cruel. The title-track was the last song recorded for the album and marked a departure from Houston's previous works; it is a new jack swing song with pop and R&B influences and lyrics that talk about sexual desire. Upon release, the single was generally well received by most critics, who applauded its sound and Houston's vocals. "I'm Your Baby Tonight" received a nomination for Best Female Pop Vocal Performance at the 33rd Grammy Awards. In retrospective reviews, it has been considered one of her best singles. The song was also commercially successful, becoming Houston's eighth number one on the US Billboard Hot 100, a feat that tied her with Madonna as the female artist with most number one hits at the time. It performed well internationally, reaching the top five of several countries, including Canada, the United Kingdom, Switzerland and Italy.

The accompanying music video was directed by Julien Temple and showed Houston sporting a more "rebellious" look, and emulating the style of figures such as Audrey Hepburn, Marlene Dietrich and the Supremes. Houston performed "I'm Your Baby Tonight" on several occasions through the 1990s, including three of her concert tours, and her HBO special Welcome Home Heroes with Whitney Houston. Brandy sang the song at the 2012 BET Awards in tribute to Houston after her death.

== Background ==
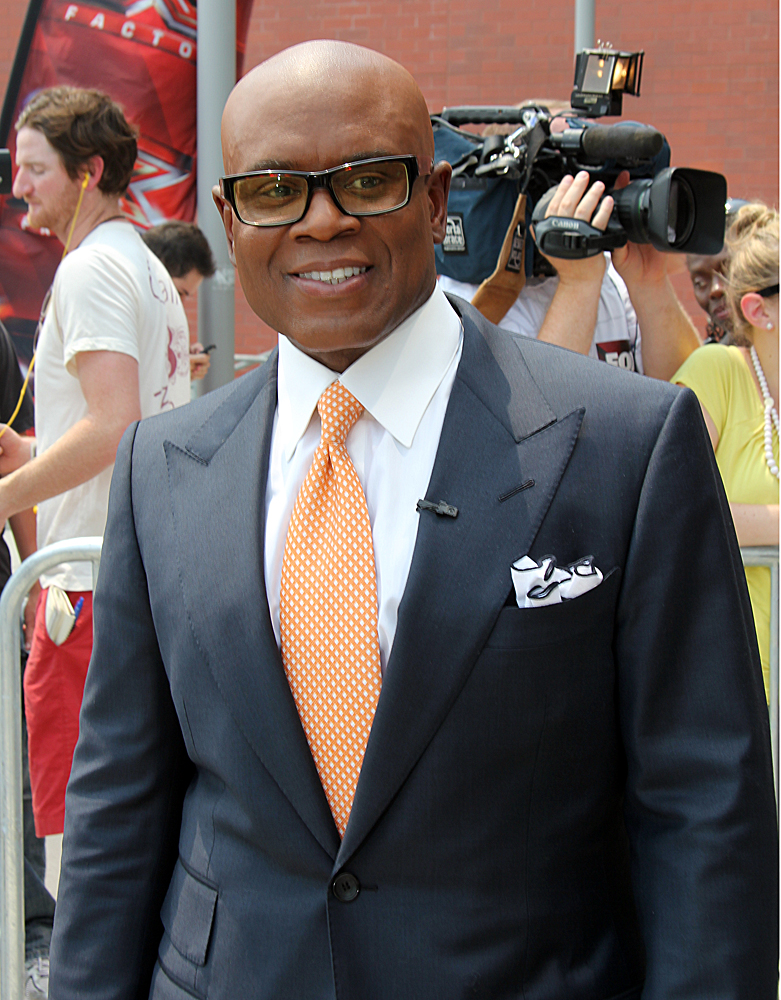
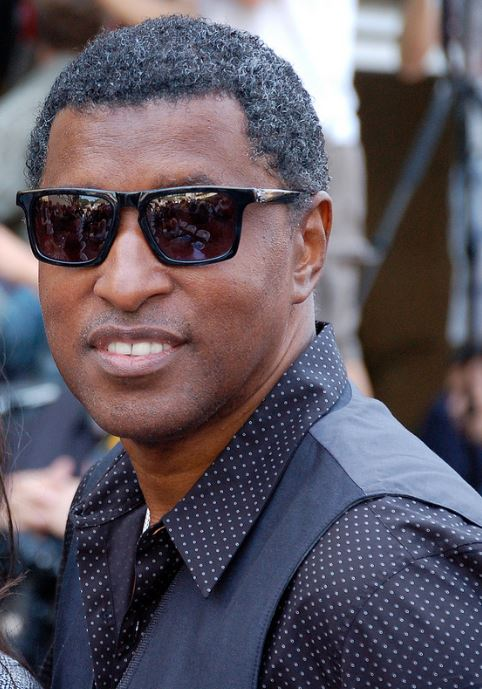
"I'm Your Baby Tonight" was written and produced by L.A. Reid (pictured left in 2011) and Babyface (pictured right in 2013)

In 1987, with the release of her second studio album, Whitney Houston became the first woman ever to debut atop the US Billboard 200. Despite commercial success, critical reception was lukewarm; critics chastised how Houston "plays everything safe", and deemed the album formulaic. At the 1989 Soul Train Music Awards, where Houston was nominated in the category of Best R&B/Urban Contemporary Single – Female, audible jeers were heard after her name was announced alongside the other nominees. She was accused of being "not black enough". Houston had been discovered by music executive Clive Davis, who had worked with artists such as Barry Manilow and, despite having presented her as an R&B artist early on her career, quickly crossed her over to adult contemporary music; according to author Sherman Andrus Sr., at the time, black artists' music was considered to be "race music" and was not played on "non-black" radio stations. Houston herself later told Ebony magazine: "When I first came out, black people felt 'she belongs to us' [...] then all of a sudden the big success came and they felt I wasn't theirs anymore [...] It was felt that I was making myself more accessible to whites, but I wasn't." She and Davis agreed that a musical change was needed if she wanted to recapture black audiences.

In 1989, Houston became romantically involved with new jack swing singer Bobby Brown, whom she had met at the Soul Train Music Awards; according to author Christine Heppermann, Brown's "unrestrained attitude" inspired the singer. For her third studio album I'm Your Baby Tonight, she decided to work with producers L.A. Reid, and Babyface, who had worked on Brown's breakthrough album Don't Be Cruel; she felt they could give her the "funky, urban groove critics felt she had been lacking". Houston then flew to Atlanta to begin working on the album with the producers, an experience she found to be quite pleasant. The first songs they worked on were "My Name Is Not Susan", "Anymore" and "I'm Your Baby Tonight". The latter was, according to Babyface, "written in pretty much before she came". Reid recalled that, although he and Babyface composed the track with the intention of vocally challenging Houston, she recorded it in less than an hour in one take.

== Composition and release ==
"I'm Your Baby Tonight"
An 18-second sample of "I'm Your Baby Tonight", featuring the refrain in which Houston can be heard singing Whatever you want from me/I'm giving you everything/I'm your baby tonight

"I'm Your Baby Tonight" was written and produced by both by L.A. Reid and Babyface. Recording took place at Los Angeles' Elumba Recording studios and New York's Axis Studios; personnel working on the song included Kenneth Richardson on programming and keyboard arrangement, alongside Donald Parks; Rodney Ascue and Jim Zumpano worked as recording engineers, Reid overlooked the percussion instruments and Babyface was in charge of the bass and keyboards. Musically, "I'm Your Baby Tonight" has been described as a new jack swing song with pop and R&B influences that "marries the call-and-response of the black church with the percussiveness of dance music". According to Stereogum's Tom Breihan, it was composed to "showcase" Houston's vocals but, unlike her past songs, it doesn't build up toward one "massive howled-out money-note". It is written in the key of A minor (performed in G♯ minor), with a tempo of 110 beats per minute in compound quadruple meter (12/8 time); it counts with a chord progression of Am_{9} – Fmaj_{7} – Bm_{7♭5} – E_{7sus} – E_{7}, with Houston's vocals spanning from C_{4} to A_{5}.

Lyrically, "I'm Your Baby Tonight" marked a departure from Houston's previous work, as it talks about sexual desire: Whatever you want from me/I'm giving you everything/I'm your baby tonight, she sings on the refrain. Other lines include I can do anything for you, baby/ I'll be down for you, baby/ Lay all my cards out tonight/ Just call on me, baby, which are sung with "raw" vocals and an "ecstatic sense of need"; Breihan held that it is the word tonight that does "a lot of work [as] it lets us know that this is a temporary arrangement". In most European countries, "I'm Your Baby Tonight" was released as the album's lead single on September 28, 1990, while in the United States, the release date was October 2. In Australia, the single was released on October 8, and in Japan, the song was released as a mini-CD single on October 28, as well as a maxi-CD single on November 7.

== Critical reception ==
Upon release, "I'm Your Baby Tonight" was met with generally positive reviews from critics: author Gerrick Kennedy referred to it as a "sassy [...] fiery track with a throbbing kick [...] bursting with the sort of brash hip-hop energy" that would go on to become a staple of Houston's future work. Rolling Stone's James Hunter singled out Houston's vocals; "L.A. and BabyFace have led her into new, less formal territory, where she sheds her gowns, swings and sounds confident, rhythmically challenged and very much at home". Larry Flick from Billboard praised the singer's "relaxed and soulful performance". Another positive review came from the staff of Music & Media, who called the song a "sure hit" and applauded its "moody dance beat" and usage of piano, which "form[s] the basis for La Houston's chilling vocals". Breihan wrote that, despite the hooks not being "as hard" as those of her previous singles "How Will I Know" (1985) and "I Wanna Dance with Somebody (Who Loves Me)" (1987), "Whitney herself is spectacular [on 'I'm Your Baby Tonight'] [...] She manages to hit big notes without ever sounding like she's trying to flex [...] [Her] voice brings more and more urgency, and she sounds like she's having more and more fun." In a more critical review, Entertainment Weekly's David Browne opined that the song "tries too hard to follow in the footsteps of Michael Jackson's 'The Way You Make Me Feel', [...] but at least it has a discernible melody". Less favorable was Duncan Holland from Music Week, who said that, "['I'm Your Baby Tonight'] fails to rescue [Houston's] crown from Lisa Stansfield and Mariah Carey. Weak to the point of little return, only safe airplay policies will save this. A belting ballad is what's required." The song received a nomination for Best Female Pop Vocal Performance at the 33rd Grammy Awards.

Retrospective reviews have been positive; Paul Grein from Billboard considered "I'm Your Baby Tonight" Houston's 12th best song, deeming it a "stylish smash". A poll conducted of Rolling Stone readers found the song to be Houston's eight best. Alexis Petridis from The Guardian placed "I'm Your Baby Tonight" at number seven of his ranking of Houston's songs, praising its "catchy as hell" refrain. The staff of Entertainment Weekly concluded that, despite having a "grittier, more street-oriented" sound, Houston's voice "remained a technical marvel"; they named it her 18th best song. Slant Magazine's Andrew Chan deemed it Houston's second best song, saying the track was a "relentless whirligig of rhythm, drenched in synths [...] a vocal tour de force, one that demonstrates how much pleasure Whitney could wring out of doing battle with a sick beat". Also from Slant Magazine, Eric Henderson named it the best Babyface single. For BET, the song is one of Houston's "funkier, harder-edged" as well as her 23rd best. The song was voted the 25th best new jack swing song by UDiscover Music. "I'm Your Baby Tonight" was included on Bruce Pollock's Rock Song Index: The 7500 Most Important Songs for the Rock & Roll Era (2014).

== Commercial performance ==
On October 20, 1990, "I'm Your Baby Tonight" debuted at number 42 on the Billboard Hot 100. By November 17, after the single reached the Hot 100's top five, it tied "I Wanna Dance with Somebody (Who Loves Me)" as Houston's fastest-rising top five hit. "I'm Your Baby Tonight" reached the chart's first position on December 1, 1990, and received a gold certification by the Recording Industry Association of America (RIAA) for shipments of 500,000 copies in the US; it was Houston's eighth number one on the Hot 100, which tied her with Madonna as the female artist with the most number one hits at the time, as well as the first number one pop hit for Babyface and L.A. Reid. "I'm Your Baby Tonight" also reached the top spot of Billboard's Hot R&B/Hip-Hop Songs chart, where it remained for two weeks. The single came in at number 42 and 79 of Billboard's year-end charts for Top Pop Singles and Top R&B Singles, respectively. In January 2023, the single was re-certified platinum for sales of one million. It spent 15 weeks in the top 40. In Canada, "I'm Your Baby Tonight" debuted in the 85th position of RPM's Top Singles chart on the week of October 27; it peaked at the second position the week of December 22.

In the United Kingdom, the single debuted at the 16th position of the UK Singles Chart on October 14, 1990, and, 2 weeks later, peaked at number 5; it spent 11 weeks on the chart overall. In Australia, the single entered the ARIA Singles Chart at number 36 on the week of November 4, 1990, eventually reaching the seventh spot, and lasting 13 weeks on the chart. In New Zealand, "I'm Your Baby Tonight" peaked at number 16. The single found success across Europe as well, topping the charts in Portugal, Italy and Greece. It peaked within the top five of countries such as Austria, Belgium, France, Switzerland and the Netherlands. "I'm Your Baby Tonight" reached the second position of the European Hot 100 Singles chart. Following Houston's death in 2012, the single re-entered the French charts at number 190.

== Music video, live performances and cover ==
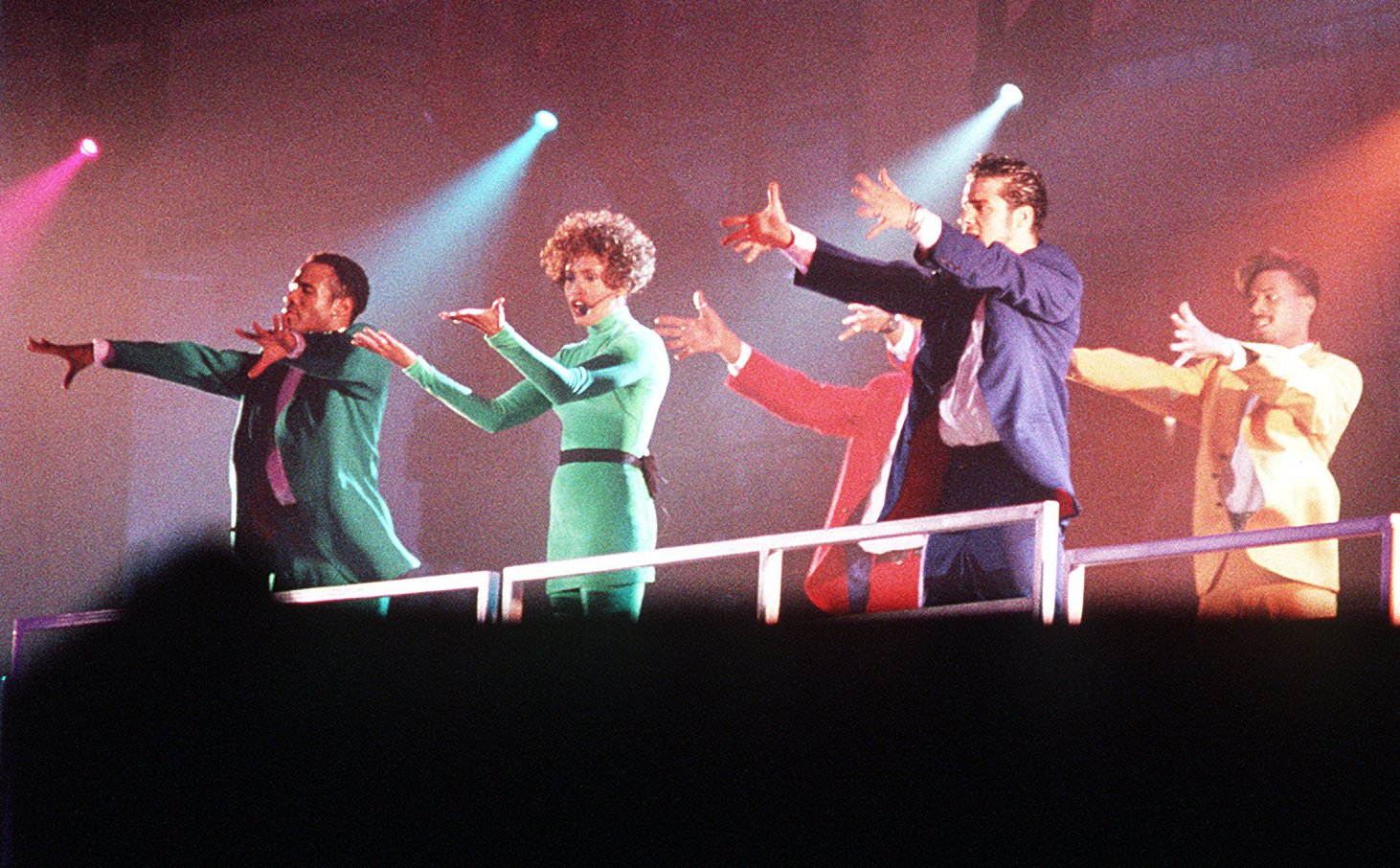
Houston performing during her HBO special Welcome Home Heroes with Whitney Houston

The music video for "I'm Your Baby Tonight" was directed by Julien Temple and filmed at a park on the Hudson River on New York's West Side and at a nightclub called Tatou. Adam Shankman was in charge of choreography. In the video, Houston emulates Audrey Hepburn's dance sequence from Funny Face (1957) and recreates the looks of Marlene Dietrich and the Supremes. Vice's Tshepo Mokoena pointed out how the music video saw an image change in Houston; dressed in ripped high-waisted jeans and an oversized leather jacket, her style was "androgynous, slightly rebellious", a contrast from her previous 1980s videos, which had her in "Barbie heels and candy-colored dresses", and focused on her "onscreen cuteness and clothing-catalogue smile". Mokoena noticed influence from the music video in the work of artist such as Janelle Monáe, Jessie Ware, Christina Aguilera and M.I.A., among others. "I'm Your Baby Tonight" can be found on the video edition of Houston's 2000 compilation Whitney: The Greatest Hits.

In early 1991, Houston performed "I'm Your Baby Tonight" on The Arsenio Hall Show and Saturday Night Live. She also sang it on her I'm Your Baby Tonight World Tour, and on some dates of her The Bodyguard (1993–94) and My Love Is Your Love (1999) concert tours. "I'm Your Baby Tonight" was one of the songs performed on Houston's 1991 HBO special Welcome Home Heroes with Whitney Houston; this performance was then included on Whitney Houston Live: Her Greatest Performances (2014). At the 2012 BET Awards, Brandy sang "I'm Your Baby Tonight" and "I Wanna Dance with Somebody (Who Loves Me)" as a tribute to Houston.

== Track listings and formats ==
- Europe CD maxi single
1. "I'm Your Baby Tonight" (album edit) – 4:16
2. "I'm Knockin'" – 4:04
3. "I'm Your Baby Tonight" (extended remix) – 6:20
4. "Feels So Good" – 4:07
- Germany CD maxi single – The Remixes
1. "I'm Your Baby Tonight" (L.A. Babyface US mix) – 4:16
2. "I'm Your Baby Tonight" (dub mix) – 5:25
3. "I'm Your Baby Tonight" (Whit-A-Pella) – 4:35
- US 12-inch vinyl single

A. "I'm Your Baby Tonight" (extended remix) – 6:20
B1. "I'm Knockin'" – 4:59
B2. "Feels So Good" – 4:55

- US cassette single

A1. "I'm Your Baby Tonight" – 4:15
A2. "I'm Knockin'" – 4:59

- UK VHS video single
1. "I'm Your Baby Tonight" (music video) – 4:15
- I'm Your Baby Tonight EP
1. "I'm Your Baby Tonight" (Yvonne Turner remix) – 4:11
2. "I'm Your Baby Tonight" (Yvonne Turner extended remix) – 6:22
3. "I'm Your Baby Tonight" (Yvonne Turner dub mix) – 5:27
4. "Feels So Good" – 4:59
5. "Takin' a Chance" – 4:11
6. "Higher Love" (1990 original mix) – 5:10

== Credits and personnel ==
Credits are adapted from the album's liner notes.

- Whitney Houston – vocals, vocal arrangement
- L.A. Reid – songwriter, producer, percussions, vocal arrangements
- Babyface – songwriter, producer, keyboard, bass, vocal arrangement
- Kenneth Richardson – keyboards, programming
- Donald Parks – keyboards
- Jim Zumpano – recording engineer
- Rodney Ascue – recording engineer

== Charts ==
=== Weekly charts ===
Weekly chart performance for "I'm Your Baby Tonight"
Chart (1990–1991)	Peak position
Australia (ARIA)	7
Austria (Ö3 Austria Top 40)	3
Belgium (Ultratop 50 Flanders)	2
Canada Top Singles (RPM)	2
Canada Retail Singles (The Record)	4
Canada Contemporary Hit Radio (The Record)	1
Europe (European Hot 100 Singles)	2
France (SNEP)	4
Germany (GfK)	5
Greece (IFPI)	1
Ireland (IRMA)	6
Italy (Musica e dischi)	1
Luxembourg (Radio Luxembourg)	4
Netherlands (Dutch Top 40)	2
Netherlands (Single Top 100)	2
New Zealand (Recorded Music NZ)	16
Norway (VG-lista)	3
Portugal (AFP)	1
Quebec (ADISQ)	4
Spain (AFYVE)	7
Sweden (Sverigetopplistan)	4
Switzerland (Schweizer Hitparade)	4
UK Singles (Official Charts)	5
US Billboard Hot 100	1
US Adult Contemporary (Billboard)	7
US Dance Club Songs (Billboard)	17
US Hot R&B/Hip-Hop Songs (Billboard)	1

Chart (2012)	Peak position
France (SNEP)	190

=== Year-end charts ===
1990 year-end chart performance for "I'm Your Baby Tonight"
Chart (1990)	Position
Australia (ARIA)	77
Belgium (Ultratop 50 Flanders)	54
Canada Top Singles (RPM)	46
Finland (Suomen virallinen lista)	12
Netherlands (Dutch Top 40)	35
Netherlands (Single Top 100)	35
Sweden (Topplistan)	19

1991 year-end chart performance for "I'm Your Baby Tonight"
Chart (1991)	Position
Europe (European Hot 100 Singles)	57
Germany (Media Control)	72
US Billboard Hot 100	42
US Adult Contemporary (Billboard)	50
US Hot R&B Singles (Billboard)	79

== Certifications ==
Certifications and sales for "I'm Your Baby Tonight"
Region	Certification	Certified units/sales
Sweden (GLF)	Gold	25,000^{^}
United Kingdom (BPI)	Silver	200,000^{‡}
United States (RIAA)	Platinum	1,000,000^{‡}
^{^} Shipments figures based on certification alone.^{‡} Sales+streaming figures based on certification alone.
