= Whitney Houston Live: Her Greatest Performances =

Live album by Whitney Houston
- Released: November 10, 2014
- Recorded: 1983–2009
- Genres: Pop; soul; R&B; gospel
- Length: 79:38 (CD); 101:58 (DVD)
- Label: Legacy Recordings

Whitney Houston chronology
I Will Always Love You: The Best of Whitney Houston (2012)	Whitney Houston Live: Her Greatest Performances (2014)	I Wish You Love: More from The Bodyguard (2017)

Professional ratings
Review scores
Source	Rating
AllMusic	3.5/5 stars
NY Daily News	5/5 stars
Buffalo News	4/5 stars
Newsday	A
Slant Magazine	2/5 stars

Whitney Houston Live: Her Greatest Performances is a posthumous live album by American recording artist Whitney Houston. It was released on November 10, 2014 by Legacy Recordings, a division of Sony Music Entertainment.

== Content and release ==
Whitney Houston Live: Her Greatest Performances sold 22,000 copies in the week ending November 16. It entered at the top on the Top R&B Albums chart, second place on the R&B/Hip Hop chart, and number 19 on the Billboard 200. This made Houston the first female artist to have a number one R&B album in four decades, later joined by Janet Jackson's Unbreakable a year later. 30% of the album sales were digital, the first time Houston has achieved that.

== Critical reception ==
Whitney Houston Live: Her Greatest Performances received generally positive reviews from music critics. Giving it 5 stars, Jim Farber of the New York Daily News, praised the album saying, 'The recordings here—with their odd echoes, imperfect playing, and wavering ambiences—show that Houston performed even better without a net than with one. The performances also work wonders in disproving the image of her, in her shiniest years, as a too-perfect wax figure of a star.' He further added, 'Only in concert did Houston, who died in 2012, show the full range of her talent. Shorn of the studio’s confining arrangements and gauzy production, the Newark native had the freedom to display those hairpin turns of phrase, last-second switches in key and playful improvisations that rank her among the greatest singers of all time.' Glenn Gamboa of Newsday gave it Grade A and wrote, 'Houston was an extraordinary singer, an artist who rarely delivered a song the same way twice. Early on, her improvised inflections, her runs, her stops and starts—they all seemed brilliantly planned and elegantly executed. "Whitney Houston Live" documents how great the singer was before her death in 2012 and builds a strong case that her talent should outlast her tabloid exploits.'

Jeff Simon of the Buffalo News gave the album 4 stars and wrote, 'While three quarters of the female singers on TV singing contests seem to want to be Houston, what she does on this disc makes them all seem like kindergarten kids wiping their noses on their sleeves.' He further stated, 'She wasn’t long for this world. But when it came to stuff like this, find me anyone in her time that did it better. Maybe, if we’re lucky no one again will ever try.'

The Slant Magazine review noted that the song list, apart from a few obvious inclusions, was inexplicable and did little to showcase the range of Whitney Houston's live talent. Andrew Chan closes with the insight that "the myth of her perfection may make her studio work definitive, but at the height of her powers, Whitney was an artist born for the stage, where her voice could pour forth unrestrained by the limits of a booth."

== Track listing ==
=== CD ===
No.	Title	Writer(s)	Taken Live From	Length
1.	"Home"	Charlie Smalls	The Merv Griffin Show, 1983	4:39
2.	"You Give Good Love"	LaLa	The Tonight Show Starring Johnny Carson, 1985	4:16
3.	"How Will I Know"	George Merrill, Shannon Rubicam, Narada Michael Walden	The BRIT Awards, 1987	4:01
4.	"One Moment in Time"	Albert Hammond, John Bettis	31st Annual Grammy Awards, 1989	5:33
5.	"Greatest Love of All"	Linda Creed, Michael Masser	That's What Friends Are For: Arista Records 15th Anniversary Concert, 1990	6:50
6.	"I Wanna Dance with Somebody (Who Loves Me)"	Merrill, Rubicam	That's What Friends Are For: Arista Records 15th Anniversary Concert, 1990	4:27
7.	"The Star Spangled Banner"	Francis Scott Key, John Stafford Smith	Super Bowl XXV, 1991	2:15
8.	"All the Man That I Need"	Dean Pitchford, Michael Gore	Welcome Home Heroes, 1991	5:07
9.	"I'm Your Baby Tonight"	L.A. Reid, Babyface	Welcome Home Heroes, 1991	4:28
10.	"A Song for You"	Leon Russell	Welcome Home Heroes, 1991	6:04
11.	"Medley: I Loves You Porgy / And I Am Telling You I'm Not Going / I Have Nothing"	George Gershwin, Ira Gershwin / Tom Eyen, Henry Krieger / David Foster, Linda Thompson	The 21st Annual American Music Awards, 1994	10:01
12.	"I'm Every Woman"	Nickolas Ashford, Valerie Simpson	The Concert for a New South Africa, 1994	3:55
13.	"I Will Always Love You"	Dolly Parton	The Concert for a New South Africa, 1994	5:59
14.	"My Love Is Your Love"	Wyclef Jean, Jerry Duplessis	Late Show with David Letterman, 1998	3:46
15.	"I Believe in You and Me"	Sandy Linzer, David Wolfert	The 16th Annual World Music Awards, 2004	3:45
16.	"I Didn't Know My Own Strength"	Diane Warren	The Oprah Winfrey Show, 2009	4:35
Total length:				79:38

=== DVD ===
No.	Title	Writer(s)	Taken Live From	Length
1.	"Home"	Charlie Smalls	The Merv Griffin Show, 1983	7:28
2.	"You Give Good Love"	LaLa	The Tonight Show Starring Johnny Carson, 1985	4:59
3.	"How Will I Know"	George Merrill, Shannon Rubicam, Narada Michael Walden	The BRIT Awards, 1987	4:12
4.	"One Moment in Time"	Albert Hammond, John Bettis	31st Annual Grammy Awards, 1989	5:49
5.	"Greatest Love of All"	Linda Creed, Michael Masser	That's What Friends Are For: Arista Records 15th Anniversary Concert, 1990	7:03
6.	"I Wanna Dance with Somebody (Who Loves Me)"	Merrill, Rubicam	That's What Friends Are For: Arista Records 15th Anniversary Concert, 1990	5:41
7.	"The Star Spangled Banner"	Francis Scott Key, John Stafford Smith	Super Bowl XXV, 1991	2:22
8.	"All the Man That I Need"	Dean Pitchford, Michael Gore	Welcome Home Heroes, 1991	6:41
9.	"I'm Your Baby Tonight"	L.A. Reid, Babyface	Welcome Home Heroes, 1991	4:27
10.	"A Song for You"	Leon Russell	Welcome Home Heroes, 1991	6:17
11.	"Medley: I Loves You Porgy / And I Am Telling You I'm Not Going / I Have Nothing"	George Gershwin, Ira Gershwin / Tom Eyen, Henry Krieger / David Foster, Linda Thompson	The 21st Annual American Music Awards, 1994	10:05
12.	"I'm Every Woman"	Nickolas Ashford, Valerie Simpson	The Concert for a New South Africa, 1994	5:17
13.	"I Will Always Love You"	Dolly Parton	The Concert for a New South Africa, 1994	9:13
14.	"My Love Is Your Love"	Wyclef Jean, Jerry Duplessis	Music Video, 1998	4:23
15.	"My Love Is Your Love"	Wyclef Jean, Jerry Duplessis	Late Show with David Letterman, 1998	3:46
16.	"When You Believe" (with Mariah Carey)	Stephen Schwartz, Babyface	The 71st Annual Academy Awards, 1999	4:11
17.	"I Believe in You and Me"	Sandy Linzer, David Wolfert	The 16th Annual World Music Awards, 2004	4:54
18.	"I Didn't Know My Own Strength"	Diane Warren	The Oprah Winfrey Show, 2009	5:10
Total length:				102:00

== Charts ==
=== Weekly charts ===
Weekly chart performance for Whitney Houston Live: Her Greatest Performances
Chart (2014)	Peak position
Australian Albums (ARIA)	119
Belgian Albums (Ultratop Flanders)	111
Belgian Albums (Ultratop Wallonia)	84
Dutch Albums (Album Top 100)	63
French Albums (SNEP)	123
Italian Albums (FIMI)	34
Japanese Albums (Oricon)	43
Scottish Albums (Official Charts)	92
South Korean Albums (Circle)	60
Spanish Albums (Promusicae)	43
UK Albums (Official Charts)	66
UK R&B Albums (Official Charts)	2
US Billboard 200	19
US Top R&B/Hip-Hop Albums (Billboard)	2
US Top R&B Albums (Billboard)	1

=== Year-end charts ===
2014 year-end chart performance for Whitney Houston Live: Her Greatest Performances
Chart (2014)	Position
US Top R&B/Hip-Hop Albums (Billboard)	100

2015 year-end chart performance for Whitney Houston Live: Her Greatest Performances
Chart (2015)	Position
US Top R&B/Hip-Hop Albums (Billboard)	50
