= Takin' a Chance =

Single by Whitney Houston

from the album I'm Your Baby Tonight
- B-side: "Love Is a Contact Sport"
- Released: October 21, 1989 (Japan)
- Recorded: 1989
- Studio: Emerald Sound Studios (Nashville, TN); The Reflections (Nashville, TN); Nightingdale Studios (Nashville, TN); Sigma Sound Studios (New York, NY)
- Genre: Pop; R&B
- Length: 4:16
- Label: Arista
- Songwriter(s): Whitney Houston; Keith Thomas; BeBe Winans
- Producer(s): Keith Thomas

Whitney Houston singles chronology
"One Moment in Time" (1988)	"Takin' a Chance" (1989)	"It Isn't, It Wasn't, It Ain't Never Gonna Be" (1989)

Licensed audio
- "Takin' A Chance" on YouTube

"Takin' a Chance" is a song by American singer Whitney Houston, promoted and released as a single in Japan on October 21, 1989 by Arista Records. The song was written by Houston, BeBe Winans and its producer Keith Thomas. The following year, the song was included only on the Japanese edition of Houston's third studio album, I'm Your Baby Tonight (1990). A 3-inch mini CD single and 7-inch vinyl included the b-side track "Love Is a Contact Sport" from her second studio album, Whitney (1987).

== Commercial promotion ==
"Takin' a Chance" was used as the theme song of Sanyo TV commercial in Japan.

== Chart performance ==
Takin' a Chance was released in Japan on 21 October 1989, and peaked at number 88 on the Oricon Singles chart.

== Live performances ==
Whitney included the song in her set during her Feels So Right Japan Tour in 1990. The song was performed regularly each night and would mark as the only performance of "Takin' a Chance" on any of Houston's tours thereafter.

== Track listing and formats ==
- Japan, CD Mini single
  - A1 "Takin' a Chance" — 4:16
  - B2 "Love Is a Contact Sport" — 4:20
- Japan, 7"Vinyl single
  - A1 "Takin' a Chance" — 4:15
  - B1 "Love Is a Contact Sport" — 4:21

== Charts ==
Chart (1989)	Peak position
Japan Singles (Oricon Charts)	88
