= I'm Every Woman (Whitney Houston recording) =

- Standard artwork (U.S. edition)

Single by Whitney Houston

from the album The Bodyguard: Original Soundtrack Album
- B-side: "Who Do You Love"
- Released: January 2, 1993
- Recorded: August–October 1992
- Studio: Tarpan (San Rafael); Ocean Way (Los Angeles)
- Genre: Dance-pop; house
- Length: 4:47
- Label: Arista
- Songwriters: Nickolas Ashford; Valerie Simpson
- Producers: Narada Michael Walden; David Cole; Robert Clivillés

Whitney Houston singles chronology
"I Will Always Love You" (1992)	"I'm Every Woman" (1993)	"I Have Nothing" (1993)

Music video
- "I'm Every Woman" on YouTube

"I'm Every Woman" is a song recorded by American singer Whitney Houston. It is a cover of the original song written by Ashford & Simpson and recorded by Chaka Khan. Houston's rendition was produced by Narada Michael Walden, with additional production by David Cole and Robert Clivillés from C+C Music Factory for the soundtrack to Houston's debut feature film The Bodyguard (1992). It was released as the second single from the soundtrack after "I Will Always Love You" on January 2, 1993.

Houston's version peaked at number four on the Billboard Hot 100 and number one on the Cashbox top singles chart in the United States, while also reaching the top five on the Billboard R&B chart and topping the Hot Dance Club Songs chart. Its top five placement in the United States while "I Will Always Love You" remained at number one resulted in Houston becoming the first artist since Madonna to place two songs within the top five simultaneously. It was later one of three Houston songs to simultaneously chart in the top twenty, making Houston the first female artist to do so in Billboard history and the first artist of the Nielsen Soundscan era to accomplish this milestone. The song also peaked within the top ten in fourteen other countries including Canada, the UK, Ireland, Denmark and the Netherlands.

The song earned Houston a Grammy Award nomination for Best Female R&B Vocal Performance at the 36th Annual Grammy Awards, eventually losing out to Toni Braxton's "Another Sad Love Song" and is notable as the only Grammy loss Houston received that year out of four nominations. The music video for the song, directed by Randee St. Nicholas, later won Houston an NAACP Image Award for Outstanding Music Video in 1994. A live performance of "I'm Every Woman" was included in the 1999 release Divas Live '99 as a duet with Khan. A 1994 performance was included on the 2014 CD and DVD release, Whitney Houston Live: Her Greatest Performances.

Like most of Houston's hits, it has been placed in retrospective best-of lists, including Pitchfork, which listed the song as one of the 250 greatest songs released in the 1990s.

== Background and recording ==
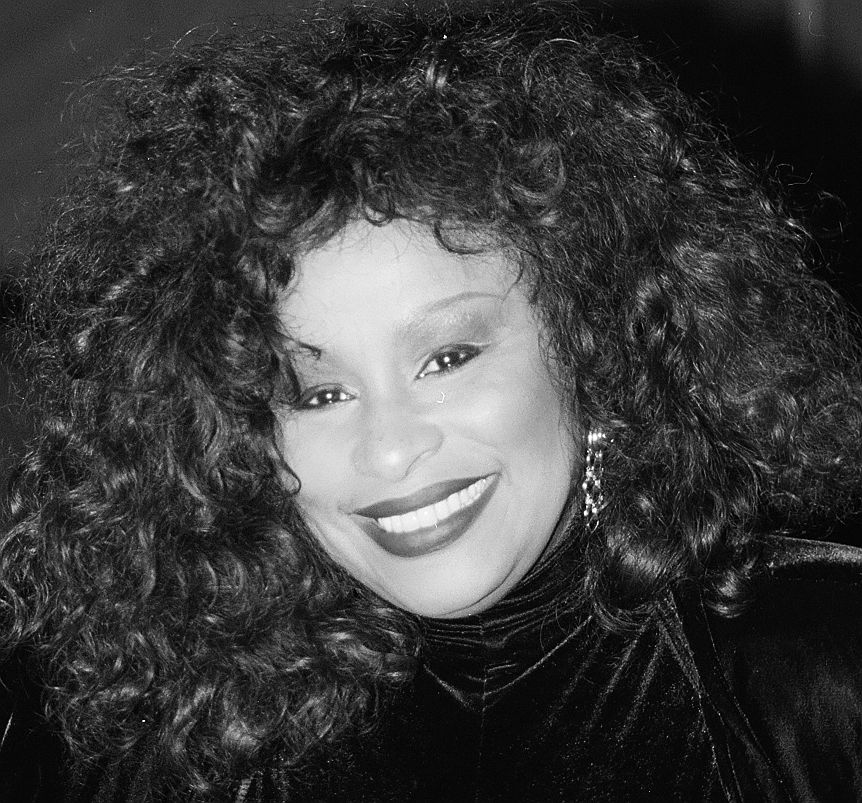
Chaka Khan (pictured in 1997) was the original vocalist behind "I'm Every Woman".

As a teenager, Houston began her early career in music as a session vocalist. In 1979, a sixteen-year-old Houston was paid $60 to sing background for American funk singer Chaka Khan on the songs "Clouds" and "Our Love's in Danger" on Khan's sophomore solo album, Naughty, which was released in March 1980. "Clouds" was written by the husband-and-wife team of Ashford & Simpson and became a Billboard R&B hit, reaching number ten on what was then called the Hot Soul Singles chart.

Houston had grown up listening to Khan's music as a child and later cited her as one of her musical inspirations. According to Houston's friend and assistant Robyn Crawford, the singer had aspired to cover Khan's songs. Around 1982, Crawford wrote a list of songs Houston told her she wanted to record; among them was Khan's breakthrough hit, "I'm Every Woman". Following her initial rise to stardom in the 1980s, Houston often covered the artist's "Sweet Thing" in concert performances and during rehearsals.

In 1991, Houston began filming her first leading role in a feature film, The Bodyguard. After initial issues concerning the music was straightened out between the film's producers—which included film co-star Kevin Costner, Houston began picking out songs assembled by the film's musical supervisor Maureen Crowe.

In her early career, Houston's label and its president, Clive Davis, had been the ones to handpick songs for Houston to record. By 1990, however, Houston aspired for more creative control of her career. That year, she became the executive producer of her third album, I'm Your Baby Tonight.

Houston retained creative control for the soundtrack, having recorded five songs, with her rendition of "I Will Always Love You" being the penultimate song. Houston decided at the last minute to record a sixth song. According to Crawford, she reminded the singer of wanting to cover Khan to which Houston then decided to do a rendition of Khan's 1978 hit, "I'm Every Woman".

Houston personally called longtime collaborator and producer Narada Michael Walden to produce the track. Walden recorded the original instrumental track at his Tarpan studio in San Rafael, California around August 1992. Houston recorded her vocals at Ocean Way Recording in Los Angeles in mid-October 1992, the same studio where months before, she laid down her vocal for the studio rendition of "I Will Always Love You".

Walden later wrote that he was nervous on how to approach the song since Khan's had been a huge hit. Houston and Walden decided to begin the song with a soul ballad intro to differ from the original and make Houston's rendition more contemporary ("Whatever you want, whatever you need..."). According to Walden, Houston, who had just married singer Bobby Brown that summer, was "nearly five months pregnant" with her daughter Bobbi Kristina Brown when they recorded the song.

Walden noted that since Houston picked the song rather than Clive Davis that the singer "really threw herself into the recording and had a definite idea of how she wanted to turn it out." Walden also noted how happy Houston was during the recording, inspired by her then recent marriage to Brown. Houston recorded the entire track in just three hours. David Cole and Robert Clivillés of the dance group C+C Music Factory and part of the production team, Clivillés and Cole, remixed the track.

According to the sheet music provided by Hal Leonard Music Publishing, the arrangement by Houston, Walden and Clivillés and Cole played mainly in the keys of A-flat major and C minor, starting off with the tempo of "slowly" before switching to a dance beat tempo at 120 beats per minute. Houston's vocal range spanned from B♭_{3} to G♭_{5}.

Contrary to popular belief, Houston did not perform backing vocals on Khan's original 1978 version. Chaka Khan confirmed this in an interview with Lester Holt in 2012. As a tribute to Khan, Houston proclaims Khan's name towards the end of the song.

== Release ==
=== Commercial performance ===
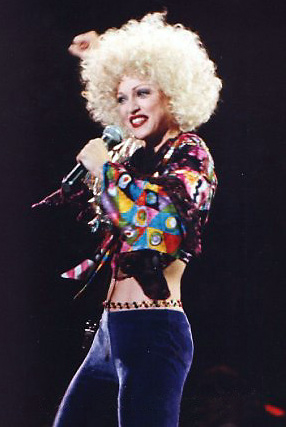
Houston's "I'm Every Woman" made her the first artist to send two songs to the top five of the Billboard Hot 100 since Madonna in 1985.

When "I'm Every Woman" was released, Houston's preceding single, "I Will Always Love You," was still at number one on the US Billboard Hot 100 (it remained there for eight more weeks). Immediately a week after its official release, the song debuted at number 66 for the week of January 9, 1993. In its sixth week on the chart, the song entered the top ten. The following week, February 20, the song climbed to its peak position of number four. In accomplishing this feat, Houston became the first artist since Madonna in April 1985 to land multiple songs inside the top five of the Billboard Hot 100. Houston was also the seventh overall artist to accomplish this feat after Madonna, Elvis Presley, the Beatles, Bee Gees, Donna Summer and Michael Jackson preceded her.

On March 13, Houston became the first artist of the Nielsen Soundscan era to chart three songs simultaneously inside the top 20 of the Billboard Hot 100 after "I'm Every Woman" and "I Will Always Love You" were joined by the third Bodyguard single, "I Have Nothing" at number 11 while the former two tracks were numbers 5 and 7 respectively. "I'm Every Woman" would remain inside the top ten for eight weeks and inside the top 40 for 19 weeks, eventually spending a total of 23 weeks altogether.

On the Hot R&B Singles chart, the song joined "I Will Always Love You" inside the top ten at number 10 on February 20. The song reached its peak position of number five on February 27. Like inside the Hot 100, the track would stay inside the top ten for eight weeks.

After entering the Billboard Hot Dance Club Play chart at number 48 on January 23, 1993, it reached number one on the chart on March 6, replacing "Mr. Wendal" by Arrested Development, marking Houston's fourth number-one single on the dance chart where it stayed for two weeks and became her first chart-topper on the chart since "Love Will Save the Day" topped the chart in August 1988.

Despite it being an uptempo single, the song crossed over to adult contemporary radio, reaching the top 30 of the Hot Adult Contemporary Tracks where it peaked at number 26 for the week of February 13, 1993, spending 14 weeks on the chart.

On the US Cash Box charts, the song was even more successful, reaching number one on both its Top 100 Singles chart and the R&B Singles chart. It was Houston's tenth number one single on the former chart as well as her eleventh number one single in the United States. In Canada, the song reached number two.

Outside North America, the song was a huge global hit. It reached number 6 on the Eurochart Hot 100. The dance song reached the top ten in 12 individual European countries, reaching number 2 in Belgium, number 3 in Spain and the Netherlands' Dutch Top 40, number 4 in the UK, Ireland, the Netherlands' Single Top 100 and Portugal, number 5 in Denmark, number 6 in Italy, number 7 in Sweden and Greece, number 8 in Iceland and number 10 in Finland. In Germany, Austria and Switzerland, it reached the top 20. In Oceania, the song reached higher positions than in Khan's version, peaking at number 5 in New Zealand and number 11 in Australia.

=== Critical reception ===
AllMusic editor Stephen Thomas Erlewine praised Houston's cover version of "I'm Every Woman", stating that it's a "first-rate" urban pop song "that skillfully capture[s] Houston at her best." Upon the release, Larry Flick from Billboard magazine wrote, "Utilizing the original version's instantly recognizable vocal arrangement, Houston belts with unbridled confidence and power." Randy Clark from Cash Box named it a "dance-inspired tune", noting its "discotheque feel and obvious dance floor appeal. Although Whitney is the strongest aspect of this song, the combination of her voice and the house jam should launch this track high onto various charts and playlists alike." Entertainment Weekly's Amy Linden praised the cover as "triumphant". She explained, "To take on another diva's material requires the female equivalent of cojones, and Houston (wisely) doesn't muck around with the original's overall tone or arrangement. But she sure does it justice, even adding a sly Chaka shout-out as the cut fades."

Alan Jones from Music Week felt the singer "does her best to xerox the performance of Chaka Khan." Nancy Culp from NME said her "Whitney-ed version" is "well over the top and she carries it decently, but lacks the real soul to give it punch." Stephen Holden of The New York Times wrote, "Though not as exuberantly sexy as the original, her version [...] is a respectable imitation." A writer from Rolling Stone called it an overwrought remake and added that Whitney undermined her soul roots. USA Today complimented the song, "She adds surprises: Chaka Khan's 'I'm Every Woman' becomes sweaty house music."

== Music video ==
The accompanying music video for "I'm Every Woman" was shot at the Newark Symphony Hall and directed by Randee St. Nicholas, and features a very pregnant Houston performing the song, while scenes from The Bodyguard are intercut into the clip.

The video featured other notable female artists making cameo appearances including the song's original vocalist Chaka Khan, label mate and R&B group TLC, the song's original composer Valerie Simpson and Houston's mother Cissy as well as Houston's female adult and child dancers performing choreography.

The video entered heavy rotation on virtually every music video channel including MTV, BET and VH1 almost as soon as it had its world premiere on those channels in January 1993.

The video was later made available on Houston's official YouTube channel in 2009 and had generated more than 107 million views as of July 2026.

== Live performances ==
Houston performed the song numerous times on her concert tours, first performing the song at the end of her concerts during The Bodyguard World Tour (1993–1994). She also performed the song during selected dates on her two last major tours, the My Love Is Your Love World Tour (1999) and the Nothing but Love World Tour (2009–2010). She also performed the song on her regional tours such as the Pacific Rim Tour (1997) and European Tour (1998).

Houston also performed it on live television, first doing so on the taping of her concert in Rio de Janeiro in January 1994, as well as taped concerts in Santiago, Buenos Aires and Caracas in April 1994 as well as the Durban and Johannesburg shows in South Africa where she became the first international artist to headline a major stadium tour in the country following the end of apartheid. She performed the song during the 1994 Soul Train Music Awards in March 1994. In April 1999, she performed the song as the finale of her show-stopping set on VH1 Divas Live, singing it with the song's original artist, Chaka Khan. She also performed the song live during her performance on Good Morning America in September 2009.

== Legacy and accolades ==
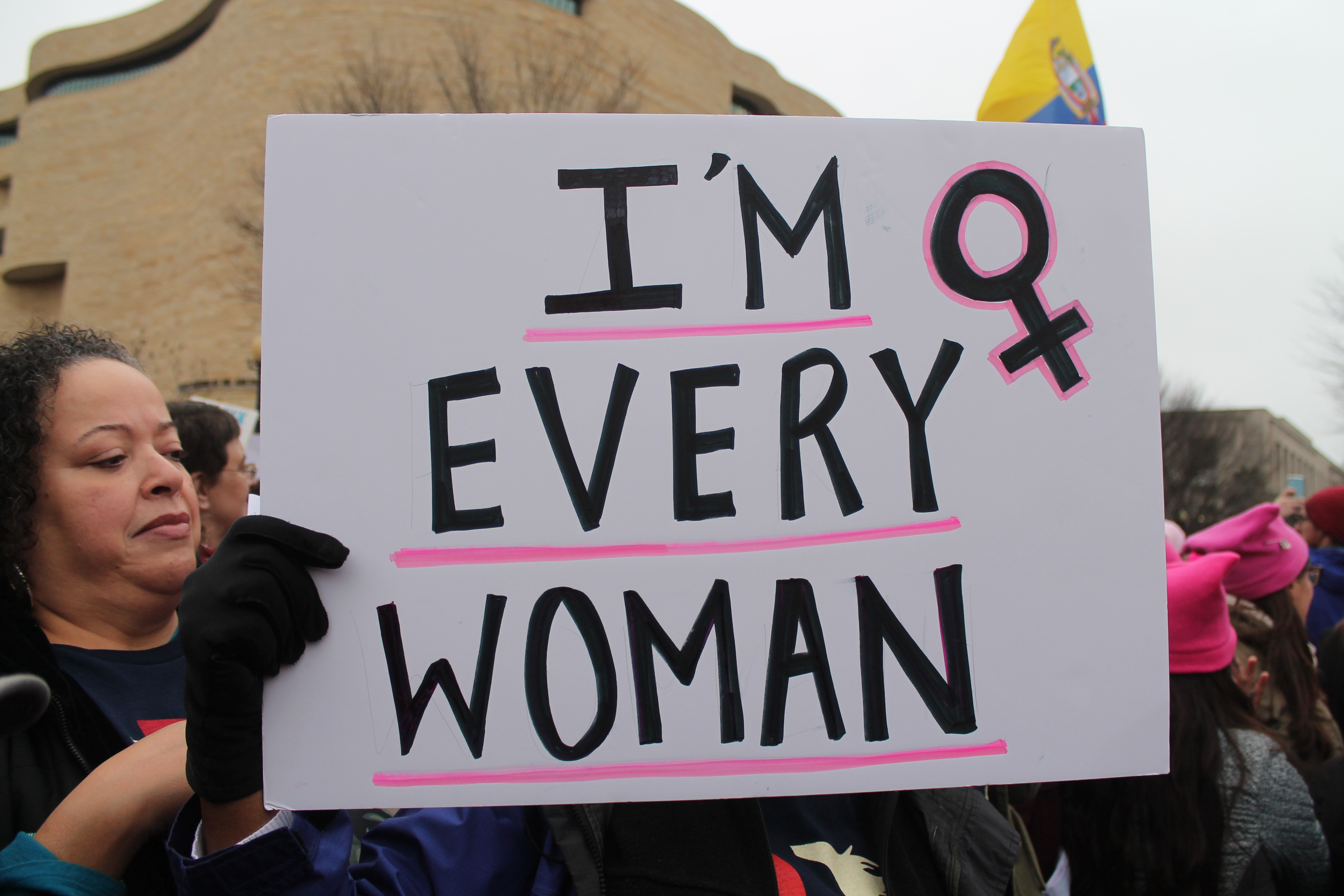
A protester holds a sign with the title of the song during the 2017 Women's March.

The song was nominated for the Grammy Award for Best Female R&B Vocal Performance at the 36th Annual Grammy Awards in 1994, losing out to Toni Braxton's "Another Sad Love Song". It was notably the only loss Houston had of her four nominations for The Bodyguard, in which she won the Grammy for Album of the Year and Record of the Year and Best Female Pop Vocal Performance for "I Will Always Love You". The video for the song won the NAACP Image Award for Outstanding Music Video that same year.

The song has received retrospective accolades since its release and has been cited as one of Houston's best songs and one of the best recordings of the 1990s. In its list of the "250 Best Songs of the 1990s", Pitchfork ranked Houston's version at number 211. It was included in the list of BuzzFeed's "101 Greatest Dance Songs". VH1 voted the song 24th place of its list of the "Greatest R&B Songs of the '90s". Rod Couch ranked the rendition the 384th greatest song of the rock era, the final-ranked song out of six Houston songs on Couch's book, The Top 500 Songs of the Rock Era 1955-2015. In their list of the 20 greatest Houston songs of her career, Forbes ranked the song thirteenth place, writing how Houston's rendition of the Khan song was an "anthem in its own right". It further wrote that the song was "a top Whitney song because it embodies the spirit of empowerment and celebrates the strength of women, a message that resonates as strongly today as it did when the song was first released."

On their list of the 25 best Houston songs prior to the singer's posthumous induction into the Rock and Roll Hall of Fame in 2020, Billboard also ranked it 13th place, writing that the song "[struck] a chord in the hearts of all women." Smooth Radio included the song in their list of fifteen best Houston songs, writing that the song was "a powerful anthem of female empowerment, celebrating the versatility and strength of women." In their list of best Houston songs, Entertainment Weekly ranked it eighth place writing how Houston took "the Chaka Khan original out of the disco era and transported it into early-'90s R&B funkland". It ranked 11th place among Houston's 20 on About.com. In their list of 15 essential Houston songs, The A.V. Club wrote that the song showed Houston's "versatility" in "full display" after the "soaring, ululating intro falls into pure disco pleasure".

Ebony mentioned Houston's rendition of the song in their article, "The Evolution of Black Female Empowerment Anthems", writing of the rendition, "[Houston] paid homage to Chaka Khan’s original version and transformed it into a soaring anthem for female solidarity." It was included alongside other black feminist anthems such as Sister Rosetta Tharpe's "Strange Things Happening Every Day", Aretha Franklin's "Respect", Janet Jackson's "Control", Lauryn Hill's "Doo Wop (That Thing)" and Destiny's Child's "Independent Women Part 1".

After Houston released her successful rendition of the song , The Oprah Winfrey Show unveiled its "I'm Every Woman" campaign in the 1993–94 season, using a cover version with remade lyrics in promos. American singer-songwriter Taylor Swift recorded the song when she was trying to get a record label deal.

The song took on some political significance when Houston's rendition of the song was played during the San Jose Women's March on January 21, 2017, with over 25,000 female protesters marching during the demonstration following the election of Donald Trump.

In 2025, Collider called the Khan and Houston renditions of the song an "enduring anthem for women’s rights and autonomy", further adding that it "also found a cherished place within the LGBTQ+ community, where it is wholeheartedly embraced for its message of self-love, authenticity, and pride", and "has evolved into a timeless gem — one that will continue to inspire and empower generations to come." In 2026, Lucille Barilla of Parade magazine called Houston's rendition "one of the most defining pop anthems of the decade".

== Track listings and formats ==
- CD single
1. "I'm Every Woman" – 4:45
2. "Who Do You Love" – 3:55
- European CD maxi-single
1. "I'm Every Woman" (7" single) – 4:44
2. "I'm Every Woman" (Clivillés & Cole House Mix I) – 10:37
3. "I'm Every Woman" (a cappella) – 4:27
- UK CD maxi-single
1. "I'm Every Woman" (7" single) – 4:44
2. "I'm Every Woman" (Every Woman's House/Club Mix Radio Edit) – 4:40
3. "I'm Every Woman" (Clivillés & Cole House Mix I) – 10:37
4. "I'm Every Woman" (Every Woman's House/Club Mix) – 10:14
5. "I'm Every Woman" (Every Woman's Beat) – 4:11
6. "I'm Every Woman" (a cappella) – 4:27
- US CD maxi-single
1. "I'm Every Woman" (Every Woman's House/Club Mix Radio Edit) – 4:40
2. "I'm Every Woman" (album version) – 4:45
3. "I'm Every Woman" (Every Woman's House/Club Mix) – 10:14
4. "I'm Every Woman" (Clivillés & Cole House Mix I) – 10:37
5. "I'm Every Woman" (Clivillés & Cole House Mix II) – 10:54
6. "Who Do You Love" – 3:55
- US 12" maxi-single
1. "I'm Every Woman" (Every Woman's House/Club Mix) – 10:14
2. "I'm Every Woman" (Every Woman's Beat) – 4:11
3. "I'm Every Woman" (Clivillés & Cole House Mix I) – 10:37
4. "I'm Every Woman" (Clivillés & Cole House Mix II) – 10:54
5. "I'm Every Woman" (The C & C Dub) – 10:03
6. "I'm Every Woman" (a cappella) – 4:27

== Credits and personnel ==
- Performed by Whitney Houston
- Produced by Narada Michael Walden
- Additional production and remix by Robert Clivilles and David Cole
- Vocal arrangement inspired by Chaka Khan
- Additional vocal arrangement and production by Robert Clivilles and David Cole
- Percussion by Bashiri Johnson
- Roland TR-909 Programming by Louis Biancaniello, James Alfano and Chauncey Mahan
- Recording engineers – Matt Rohr, Marc Reyburn
- Additional production recording engineers – Acar S. Key, Richard Joseph
- Mixing engineer – Bob Rosa
- Executive producers - Clive Davis, Whitney Houston

== Charts ==
=== Weekly charts ===
Chart (1993)	Peak position
Australia (ARIA)	11
Austria (Ö3 Austria Top 40)	19
Belgium (Ultratop 50 Flanders)	2
Canada Top Singles (RPM)	2
Canada Adult Contemporary (RPM)	11
Canada Dance/Urban (RPM)	1
Canada Contemporary Hit Radio (The Record)	2
Denmark (IFPI)	5
Europe (Eurochart Hot 100)	6
Europe (European Dance Radio)	1
Europe (European Hit Radio)	1
Finland (Suomen virallinen lista)	10
France (SNEP)	11
Germany (GfK)	13
Greece (Pop + Rock)	7
Iceland (Íslenski Listinn Topp 40)	8
Ireland (IRMA)	4
Italy (Musica e dischi)	6
Netherlands (Dutch Top 40)	3
Netherlands (Single Top 100)	4
New Zealand (Recorded Music NZ)	5
Portugal (AFP)	4
Quebec (ADISQ)	7
Spain (AFYVE)	3
Sweden (Sverigetopplistan)	7
Switzerland (Schweizer Hitparade)	18
UK Singles (Official Charts)	4
UK Airplay (Music Week)	1
UK Dance (Music Week)	1
UK Club Chart (Music Week)	1
US Billboard Hot 100	4
US Adult Contemporary (Billboard)	26
US Dance Club Songs (Billboard)	1
US Dance Singles Sales (Billboard)	1
US Hot R&B/Hip-Hop Songs (Billboard)	5
US Pop Airplay (Billboard)	3
US Rhythmic Airplay (Billboard)	11
US Cash Box Top 100	1
US R&B Singles (Cash Box)	1
US Dance Singles (Cash Box)	1
US CHR/Pop Airplay (Radio & Records)	1

Chart (2012)	Peak position
Australia (ARIA)	95
France (SNEP)	92
Japan Hot 100 (Billboard)	53
Netherlands (Single Top 100)	87
US Digital Song Sales (Billboard)	70

Chart (2022)	Peak position
South Africa Radio (RISA)	34

=== Year-end charts ===
Chart (1993)	Position
Australia (ARIA)	61
Belgium (Ultratop 50 Flanders)	41
Canada Top Singles (RPM)	31
Canada Adult Contemporary (RPM)	79
Canada Dance/Urban (RPM)	13
Europe (Eurochart Hot 100)	36
Europe (European Dance Radio)	21
Germany (Media Control)	80
Iceland (Íslenski Listinn Topp 40)	55
Netherlands (Dutch Top 40)	46
Netherlands (Single Top 100)	56
Sweden (Topplistan)	81
UK Singles (OCC)	51
UK Airplay (Music Week)	8
UK Club Chart (Music Week)	9
US Billboard Hot 100	39
US Dance Club Play (Billboard)	10
US Hot R&B Singles (Billboard)	35
US Maxi-Singles Sales (Billboard)	25
US Cash Box Top 100	21

== Certifications and sales ==
Region	Certification	Certified units/sales
Australia (ARIA)	Gold	35,000^{^}
United Kingdom (BPI)	Silver	200,000^{‡}
United States (RIAA)	Platinum	1,000,000^{‡}
^{^} Shipments figures based on certification alone.^{‡} Sales+streaming figures based on certification alone.

== Release history ==
Region	Date	Format(s)	Label(s)	Ref.
United States	January 2, 1993	7-inch vinyl; 12-inch vinyl; CD; cassette	Arista	
Sweden	January 11, 1993	CD	Arista	
United Kingdom	February 8, 1993	7-inch vinyl; 12-inch vinyl; CD; cassette	Arista	
Australia	February 14, 1993	Cassette	Arista	
Australia	March 7, 1993	12-inch vinyl	Arista	
Japan	March 24, 1993	Mini-CD	Arista	

== Bibliography ==
- Crawford, Robyn (2019). A Song for You: My Life with Whitney Houston. Penguin Publisher Group. ISBN 978-1-524-74286-7.
- Walden, Narada Michael (2012). Whitney Houston: The Voice, The Music, The Inspiration. Insight Editions. ISBN 978-1-608-87200-8.
