= The Collection (Whitney Houston album) =

Box set by Whitney Houston
- Released: April 19, 2010
- Recorded: 1984–1998
- Label: Sony Music / Arista

Whitney Houston chronology
I Look to You (2009)	The Collection (2010)	I Will Always Love You: The Best of Whitney Houston (2012)

Professional ratings
Review scores
Source	Rating
Allmusic	3.5/5 stars
Daily Express	(favorable)

The Collection is a 5-CD box set, released to coincide with American singer Whitney Houston's Nothing but Love World Tour, that comprises five of Houston's multi-platinum albums, from Whitney Houston (1985) to My Love Is Your Love (1998) excluding The Preacher's Wife soundtrack (1996). Each disc is presented in mini-LP style card picture sleeves, housed in a picture box with a lift-off lid. It was her final release to be released in her lifetime.

== Track listing ==
=== Disc 1: Whitney Houston ===
No.	Title	Writer(s)	Producer(s)	Length
1.	"You Give Good Love"	La La	Kashif	4:37
2.	"Thinking About You"	Kashif; La La	Kashif	5:24
3.	"Someone for Me"	Raymond Jones; Freddie Washington	Jermaine Jackson	4:58
4.	"Saving All My Love for You"	Michael Masser; Gerry Goffin	Masser	3:58
5.	"Nobody Loves Me Like You Do" (duet with Jermaine Jackson)	James P. Dunne; Pamela Phillips	Jackson	3:48
6.	"How Will I Know"	George Merrill; Shannon Rubicam; Narada Michael Walden	Walden	4:35
7.	"All at Once"	Jeffrey Osborne; Masser	Masser	4:28
8.	"Take Good Care of My Heart" (duet with Jermaine Jackson)	Peter McCann; Steve Dorff	Jackson	4:15
9.	"Greatest Love of All"	Linda Creed; Masser	Masser	4:51
10.	"Hold Me" (duet with Teddy Pendergrass)	Creed; Masser	Masser	6:00
Total length:				46:54

=== Disc 2: Whitney ===
No.	Title	Writer(s)	Producer(s)	Length
1.	"I Wanna Dance with Somebody (Who Loves Me)"	George Merrill; Shannon Rubicam	Narada Michael Walden	4:51
2.	"Just the Lonely Talking Again"	Sam Dees	Walden	5:32
3.	"Love Will Save the Day"	Toni C.	Jellybean	5:21
4.	"Didn't We Almost Have It All"	Michael Masser; Will Jennings	Masser	5:05
5.	"So Emotional"	Billy Steinberg; Tom Kelly	Walden	4:36
6.	"Where You Are"	LeMel Humes; James Calabrese; Dyan Humes	Kashif	4:10
7.	"Love Is a Contact Sport"	Preston Glass	Walden	4:19
8.	"You're Still My Man"	Masser; Gerry Goffin	Masser	4:16
9.	"For the Love of You"	O'Kelly Isley; Ronald Isley; Marvin Isley; Chris Jasper	Walden	5:31
10.	"Where Do Broken Hearts Go"	Frank Wildhorn; Chuck Jackson	Walden	4:37
11.	"I Know Him So Well" (duet with Cissy Houston)	Tim Rice; Benny Andersson; Björn Ulvaeus	Walden	4:30
Total length:				52:48

=== Disc 3: I'm Your Baby Tonight ===
No.	Title	Writer(s)	Producer(s)	Length
1.	"I'm Your Baby Tonight"	L.A. Reid; Babyface	Reid; Babyface	4:59
2.	"My Name Is Not Susan"	Eric Foster White	Reid; Babyface	4:39
3.	"All the Man That I Need"	Dean Pitchford; Michael Gore	Narada Michael Walden	4:11
4.	"Lover for Life"	Sam Dees	Walden	4:49
5.	"Anymore"	Reid; Babyface	Reid; Babyface	4:23
6.	"Miracle"	Reid; Babyface	Reid; Babyface	5:42
7.	"I Belong to You"	Derek Bramble; Franne Golde	Walden	5:30
8.	"Who Do You Love"	Luther Vandross; Hubert Eaves III	Vandross	3:57
9.	"We Didn't Know" (duet with Stevie Wonder)	Stevie Wonder	Wonder	5:30
10.	"After We Make Love"	Michael Masser; Gerry Goffin	Masser	5:07
11.	"I'm Knockin'"	Rhett Lawrence; Ricky Minor; Benjamin Winans	Minor; Whitney Houston	4:58
Total length:				53:51

=== Disc 4: The Bodyguard: Original Soundtrack Album ===
No.	Title	Writer(s)	Producer(s)	Length
1.	"I Will Always Love You"	Dolly Parton	David Foster	4:31
2.	"I Have Nothing"	David Foster; Linda Thompson	Foster	4:49
3.	"I'm Every Woman"	Nickolas Ashford; Valerie Simpson	Narada Michael Walden; Robert Clivillés; David Cole	4:45
4.	"Run to You"	Allan Rich; Jud Friedman	Foster	4:24
5.	"Queen of the Night"	Whitney Houston; Antonio "L.A." Reid; Kenneth "Babyface" Edmonds; Daryl Simmons	L.A. Reid; Babyface	3:08
6.	"Jesus Loves Me"	Anna Bartlett Warner; William Batchelder Bradbury	BeBe Winans; Houston	5:12
7.	"Even If My Heart Would Break" (Kenny G and Aaron Neville)	Franne Golde; Adrian Gurvitz	Foster; Walter Afanasieff	4:58
8.	"Someday (I'm Coming Back)" (Lisa Stansfield)	Lisa Stansfield; Andy Morris; Ian Devaney	Andy Morris; Ian Devaney	4:57
9.	"It's Gonna Be a Lovely Day" (The S.O.U.L. S.Y.S.T.E.M.)	Bill Withers; Skip Scarborough; Robert Clivillés; David Cole; Tommy Never; Michelle Visage	Clivillés; Cole; Ricky Crespo	4:47
10.	"(What's So Funny 'Bout) Peace, Love, and Understanding" (Curtis Stigers)	Nick Lowe	Danny Kortchmar	4:04
11.	"Trust in Me" (Joe Cocker featuring Sass Jordan)	Charlie Midnight; Marc Swersky; Francesca Beghe	Charlie Midnight	4:12
12.	"Theme from The Bodyguard" (Alan Silvestri)	Alan Silvestri	Alan Silvestri	2:40
Total length:				57:44

=== Disc 5: My Love Is Your Love ===
No.	Title	Writer(s)	Producer(s)	Length
1.	"It's Not Right but It's Okay"	Rodney Jerkins; Fred Jerkins III; LaShawn Daniels; Isaac Phillips; Toni Estes	R. Jerkins	4:52
2.	"Heartbreak Hotel" (featuring Faith Evans and Kelly Price)	Kenneth Karlin; Tamara Savage; Carsten Schack	Soulshock and Karlin	4:41
3.	"My Love Is Your Love"	Wyclef Jean; Jerry "Wonder" Duplessis	Jean; Duplessis	4:21
4.	"When You Believe" (duet with Mariah Carey)	Stephen Schwartz; Babyface (add.)	Babyface	4:32
5.	"If I Told You That"	R. Jerkins; F. Jerkins; Daniels; Estes	R. Jerkins	4:37
6.	"In My Business" (featuring Missy "Misdemeanor" Elliott)	Elliott; Kelvin "K.B." Bradshaw; Lloyd "Spec" Turner	Elliott; Bradshaw; Turner	3:27
7.	"I Learned from the Best"	Diane Warren	David Foster	4:19
8.	"Oh Yes"	Elliott; Bradshaw; Turner	Elliott; Bradshaw; Turner	6:47
9.	"Get It Back"	R. Jerkins; F. Jerkins; Daniels; Estes	R. Jerkins	4:53
10.	"Until You Come Back"	Babyface; Daryl Simmons	Babyface	4:52
11.	"I Bow Out"	Warren	Babyface; R. Jerkins	4:31
12.	"You'll Never Stand Alone"	Warren	Babyface	4:21
13.	"I Was Made to Love Him" (Hidden track)	Henry Cosby; Lula Mae Hardaway; Sylvia Moy; Stevie Wonder	Lauryn Hill	4:26
Total length:				60:44

== Charts ==
=== Weekly charts ===
Chart (2012)	Peak position
Irish Albums (IRMA)	48
Spanish Albums (Promusicae)	70
Swedish Albums (Sverigetopplistan)	32

=== Monthly charts ===
Chart (2012)	Peak position
Polish Albums (ZPAV)	30
