= I'm Your Baby Tonight World Tour =

1991 concert tour by Whitney Houston

- Tour by Whitney Houston
- I'm Your Baby Tonight Tour Book
- Location: • 66 North America • 29 Europe • 2 Asia
- Associated album: I'm Your Baby Tonight
- Start date: March 14, 1991
- End date: October 2, 1991
- Legs: 3
- No. of shows: 97

Whitney Houston concert chronology
- Moment of Truth World Tour (1987–88); I'm Your Baby Tonight World Tour (1991); The Bodyguard World Tour (1993–94)

The I'm Your Baby Tonight World Tour was the third world concert tour by American singer Whitney Houston, in support of her hit album, I'm Your Baby Tonight (1990). In a span of seven months from March and October 1991, Houston performed 97 concert dates in Asia, North America and Europe.

== Background ==
Following the end of her expansive 160-date Moment of Truth World Tour in 1988, Houston took a much-deserved break from the road, having performed nonstop for four years since the release of her debut album in 1985. Throughout 1989, Houston had formed the Whitney E. Houston Foundation for Children, a non-profit organization that looked after children and had also begun participating in duets with artists such as the gospel-singing sibling duo BeBe and CeCe Winans and soul legend Aretha Franklin. Houston also began getting acquainted with R&B singer Bobby Brown around this time.

By the fall of the year, Houston had returned to the recording studio to record the contents of her third album, I'm Your Baby Tonight. Houston took a more hands-on approach with the album, incorporating more gospel and funk elements after she had been accused of "singing too white" on her last album. It would be the first of her albums where she attributed composition and record production and her first to attain creative control as an executive producer. In the album's early stages in January 1990, she returned on the road for a 14-date tour of Japan, labeled the Feels So Right Tour, named after a song she had recorded called "Feels So Good", which later was released as the b-side of her hit single, "I'm Your Baby Tonight". The tour featured male background singers, including her brother Gary Garland as well as five male background dancers and newer band members such as Bette Sussman, Kirk Whalum and Ricky Lawson.

After finishing the recording of I'm Your Baby Tonight, which included producers Antonio "L.A." Reid and Babyface, the album was released in November and became an immediate hit upon its release, reaching number three on the Billboard 200 with the first two singles, "I'm Your Baby Tonight" and "All the Man That I Need" going all the way to number one on the Billboard Hot 100. In the middle of its promotion, Houston gave an acclaimed performance of "The Star-Spangled Banner" at Super Bowl XXV during the Persian Gulf War in January 1991. Because of the situation in the war, Houston, who had planned to start her world tour in the United Kingdom that March, decided to postpone the UK shows to the fall. Afterwards it was announced that the tour would primarily stop in the United States in April with two preceding dates in the previous month at Japan.

== Overview ==
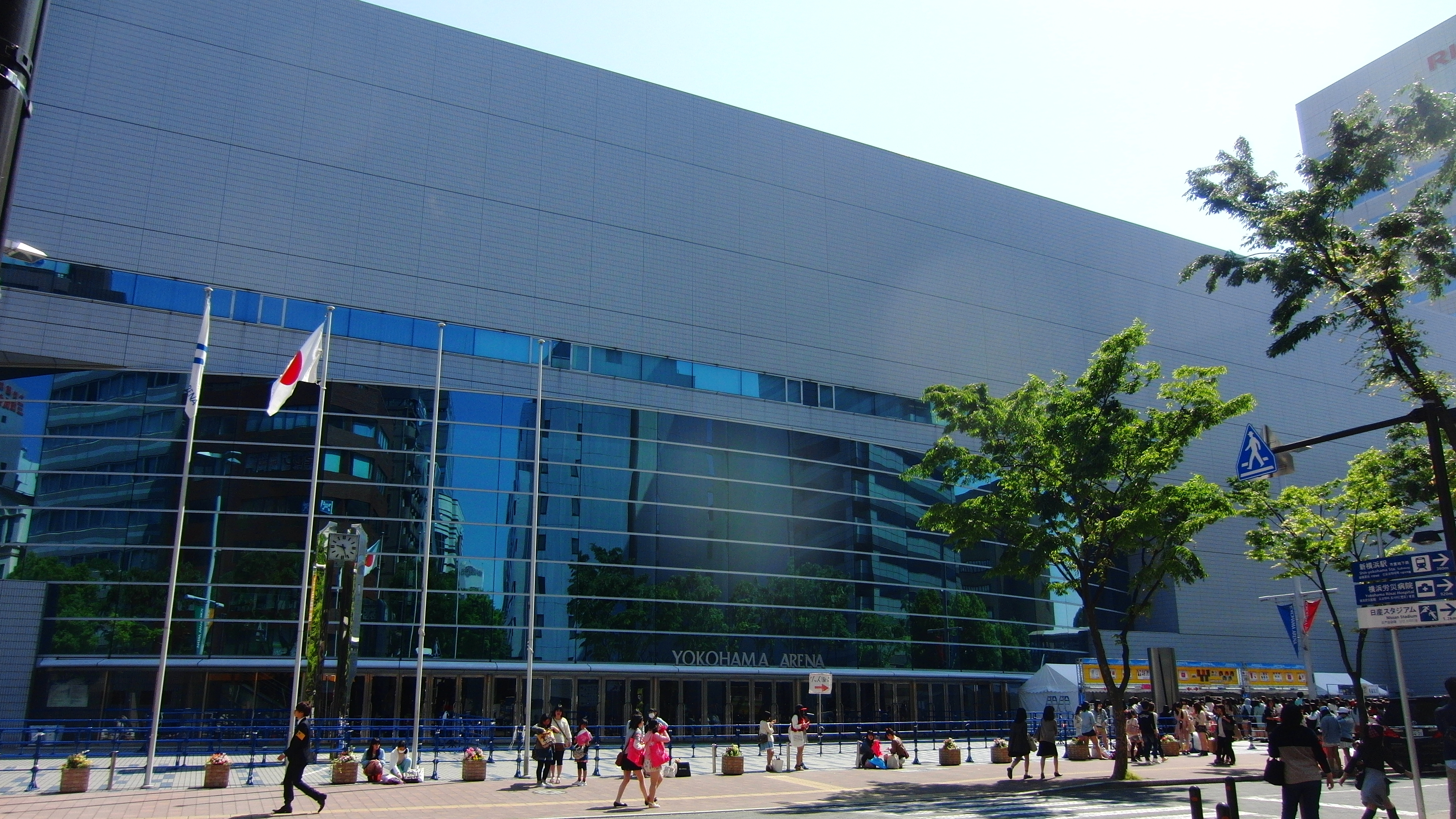
The I'm Your Baby Tonight World Tour began in Yokohama, Japan at the Yokohama Arena.

Houston launched the tour in Yokohama, Japan at the Yokohama Arena on March 14, 1991. Following a March 15 date at the same venue, it would serve to be the only two Asian shows for the tour as Houston began negotiations with HBO for a televised concert for American troops stationed at Kuwait during the Persian Gulf War. Though by the end of her Japanese concerts, the war had ended and troops were returning home. Instead, the plan changed to holding a concert at the Norfolk Naval Air Base on Easter Sunday, March 31, 1991, with the concert proceeds going directly to the Red Cross. The singer and the network agreed to give a free, unscrambled concert so everyone could watch. That special, Welcome Home Heroes with Whitney Houston, became HBO's most viewed concert in history at the time with over 50 million viewers watching.

The tour wasn't without controversy: a night prior to her performance at the Rupp Arena in Lexington, Kentucky on April 20, Houston made headlines after she reportedly was involved in an altercation at a Lexington hotel involving her brother Michael and three autograph seekers, who verbally attacked Houston with racial slurs, leading to a physical fight, which ended when Houston jumped on one of the men for attacking her brother and punching him. Initially charged with fourth degree assault, charges were dropped on the singer in May when prosecutors were confronted with "contradictory evidence" to claims made against her by Ransom Brotherton, one of the men involved in the melee, and for struggle to prove Houston guilty.

Mid-1991 was considered one of the worst touring seasons ever. Many big names in pop and rock music were cancelling dates and playing to low capacities. Houston was no exception. The singer played to low attendances and even cancelled some dates due to poor ticket sales. Experts cited the ongoing recession and financial crisis as the main reason. In August, Houston also developed a throat ailment. As a result, the singer was forced to cancel the end of her Canadian tour to rest her voice.

The tour resumed in late August when Houston reached the UK. She played ten consecutive sold-out dates at Wembley Arena in London, surpassing her own record of nine straight dates at the same arena during the Moment of Truth World Tour, in 1988. The ten-date residence remains the most performances in a single year by a female artist in the history of the arena.

Following the historic UK performances, Houston continued the European leg of the tour with dates in Spain, Germany and France before ending the tour in Paris on October 2. A month and a half after the tour concluded, Houston would begin production on her first feature film, The Bodyguard, which had been announced that April but postponed to November by Kevin Costner.

== The show ==
Unlike her previous tours, the shows had more focus on visuals. The stage was lit by 300 lights spinning and flashing in synch with the music. The state of the art system was designed by Mark Fisher and Jonathan Park. The system had only been used previously by Pink Floyd in his "The Wall" show in Berlin and the Rolling Stones' "Urban Jungle Tour". Houston also incorporated costume changes during her sets for the first time. She often wore skin tight jump suits. Houston also took part in choreographed dancing with backup dancers. Unlike her previous tours, the stage was not in the round. She was backed by a seven piece band. After her previous musical director John Simmons died, bass player Rickey Minor became the tour's musical director. R&B group After 7 opened during the North American leg. Dance act Snap! supported her on the European leg. One of the most noted features was Houston wearing flamboyant catsuits, designed by South African fashion designer Marc Bouwer, who would be her personal designer for a number of years.

Houston reworked most of the songs during the show with improvisations and spontaneity, adding funk to the uptempos while slowing down the ballads. According to the Minneapolis Star Tribune, "Saving All My Love for You" was "sultry, taking excursions through the church and jazz world that aren't heard on the recorded version." She incorporated her popular love songs into a "Love Medley", giving her time to try out the newer uptempo/new jack swing numbers on her current album. Midway through the shows, Houston introduced her band while singing the gospel "Revelation". This started the gospel set which included a cappella and solos from her backup singers. Her brother Gary Houston also performed a Marvin Gaye medley. With hip hop music becoming popular during the time, Houston incorporated rappers into the show. Rappers were given verses during "How Will I Know" while shouting "yo Whitney yo" throughout other songs. During some of the shows, Houston incorporated her hit "All The Man That I Need" into a medley with the Billie Holiday classics "Lover Man (Oh Where Can You Be?)" and "My Man", which she dedicated to her own man at the time. At the time, Houston was rumored to be dating singer Bobby Brown. The rumor of course turned out to be true. The Holliday cover earned praise from many critics. The Vancouver Sun said "her delivery was achingly soulful" and that the singer should continue towards that direction musically. For some of the US dates, she performed her top ten pop hit "Miracle". Houston ended her show with "I'm Your Baby Tonight" before the encore, "Greatest Love of All", in Europe for some of the London, UK dates included the encore "I Belong to You".

Some criticized Houston for focusing on the MTV trend of relying on dancing and big production lighting. The Sun Sentinel noted that the singer should opt for smaller venues and theaters that are "far more suitable to her sophistication and talent." USA Today praised the singer because she "shakes the confinements of her recordings' calculated productions and gets downright gutsy and soulful"

== Opening acts ==
- After 7 (US leg)
- Snap! (European leg)
- D'Influence (Glasgow Scotland)
- Gerald Alston (European leg, select dates)

== Set list ==
This set list is representative of the concert on May 11, 1991 at Oakland Alameda County Coliseum Arena in Oakland, California. It does not represent all concerts for the duration of the tour.

1. "I Wanna Dance with Somebody (Who Loves Me)"
2. "So Emotional"
3. "Saving All My Love for You"
4. "How Will I Know"
5. "All at Once" / "A House Is Not a Home" / "Didn't We Almost Have It All" / "Where Do Broken Hearts Go"
6. "Lover Man (Oh, Where Can You Be?)" / "My Man" / "All the Man That I Need"
7. "Mercy Mercy Me (The Ecology)" / "What's Going On" (performed by Gary Houston)
8. "My Name Is Not Susan"
9. "Anymore"
10. "Miracle"
11. "Revelation" (contain elements of "He's All Right")
12. "In Return" (Note: performed at select dates in North America)
13. "This Day" (Note: performed at select dates in Europe)
14. "Who Do You Love"
15. "I'm Your Baby Tonight"
16. "I Belong to You"
17. "Greatest Love of All"

Notes

Additional notes

- March 14 and 15: in Yokohama, Japan, Houston performed a stirring rendition of "In Return".
- May 11: her performances of "My Name Is Not Susan", "Miracle" and "Greatest Love of All" at her Oakland, California concert were shown during a televised telethon that aired on MTV, May 12, for The Simple Truth: A concert for Kurdish Refugees.
- September 29: the concert in A Coruña, Spain was recorded and aired on TV in several markets of Spain, and select countries in Europe.

== Shows ==
List of concerts, showing date, city, country, venue, tickets sold, number of available tickets and amount of gross revenue
Date	City	Country	Venue	Attendance	Revenue
Asia
March 14, 1991	Yokohama	Japan	Yokohama Arena	—N/a	—N/a
March 15, 1991	Yokohama	Japan	Yokohama Arena	—N/a	—N/a
North America
March 31, 1991	Norfolk	United States	Naval Air Station	3,500 / 3,500	—N/a
April 18, 1991	Knoxville	United States	Thompson–Boling Arena	6,836 / 16,786	$136,637
April 20, 1991	Lexington	United States	Rupp Arena	—N/a	—N/a
April 21, 1991	Champaign	United States	Assembly Hall	—N/a	—N/a
April 22, 1991	East Lansing	United States	Breslin Student Events Center	—N/a	—N/a
April 23, 1991	Columbia	United States	Hearnes Center		—N/a
April 24, 1991	Ames	United States	Hilton Coliseum	6,175 / 13,000	—N/a
April 26, 1991	Iowa City	United States	Carver–Hawkeye Arena	—N/a	—N/a
April 27, 1991	Minneapolis	United States	Target Center	—N/a	
April 29, 1991	Winnipeg	Canada	Winnipeg Arena	5,832 / 12,470	$156,624
May 1, 1991	Saskatoon	Canada	Saskatchewan Place	—N/a	—N/a
May 3, 1991	Edmonton	Canada	Northlands Coliseum	—N/a	—N/a
May 5, 1991	Calgary	Canada	Olympic Saddledome	9,736 / 14,114	$238,662
May 7, 1991	Vancouver	Canada	Pacific Coliseum	—N/a	—N/a
May 8, 1991	Portland	United States	Memorial Coliseum	9,387 / 10,000	$218,422
May 9, 1991	Seattle	United States	Seattle Center Coliseum	8,807 / 11,993	$203,520
May 11, 1991	Oakland	United States	Oakland–Alameda County Coliseum Arena	—N/a	—N/a
May 12, 1991	Sacramento	United States	ARCO Arena	9,031 / 12,786	$208,640
May 16, 1991	Inglewood	United States	Great Western Forum	—N/a	—N/a
May 17, 1991	Costa Mesa	United States	Pacific Amphitheatre	—N/a	—N/a
May 19, 1991	Phoenix	United States	Desert Sky Pavilion	10,774 / 12,000	$221,576
May 21, 1991	Las Vegas	United States	Thomas & Mack Center	—N/a	—N/a
May 23, 1991	Albuquerque	United States	Tingley Coliseum	—N/a	—N/a
May 24, 1991	Greenwood Village	United States	Fiddler's Green Amphitheatre	—N/a	—N/a
May 25, 1991	Salt Lake City	United States	Salt Palace	—N/a	—N/a
May 28, 1991	New Orleans	United States	Lakefront Arena	—N/a	—N/a
May 30, 1991	Oklahoma City	United States	Myriad Convention Center	—N/a	—N/a
May 31, 1991	Dallas	United States	Coca-Cola Starplex Amphitheatre	8,837 / 20,111	$188,511
June 2, 1991	The Woodlands	United States	Cynthia Woods Mitchell Pavilion	—N/a	—N/a
June 4, 1991	San Antonio	United States	HemisFair Arena	—N/a	—N/a
June 5, 1991	Austin	United States	Frank Erwin Center	—N/a	—N/a
June 7, 1991	Birmingham	United States	BJCC Coliseum	—N/a	—N/a
June 9, 1991	Pensacola	United States	Pensacola Civic Center	—N/a	—N/a
June 10, 1991	Orlando	United States	Orlando Arena	7,093 / 15,500	$159,593
June 11, 1991	Miami	United States	Miami Arena	9,530 / 10,000	$238,250
June 13, 1991	Columbia	United States	Carolina Coliseum	—N/a	—N/a
June 15, 1991	Atlanta	United States	Atlanta-Fulton County Stadium	—N/a	—N/a
June 16, 1991	Greensboro	United States	Greensboro Coliseum	—N/a	—N/a
June 19, 1991	Chattanooga	United States	McKenzie Arena	—N/a	—N/a
June 20, 1991	Nashville	United States	Starwood Amphitheatre	8,000 / 17,137	—N/a
June 27, 1991^{[A]}	Milwaukee	United States	Marcus Amphitheater	—N/a	—N/a
June 28, 1991	Noblesville	United States	Deer Creek Music Center	7,746 / 12,000	$157,199
June 30, 1991	Tinley Park	United States	World Music Theatre	8,525 / 20,000	$221,965
July 3, 1991	Detroit	United States	Joe Louis Arena	—N/a	—N/a
July 6, 1991	Charlotte	United States	Blockbuster Pavilion	—N/a	—N/a
July 7, 1991	Raleigh	United States	Hardee's Walnut Creek Amphitheatre	—N/a	—N/a
July 10, 1991	Cuyahoga Falls	United States	Blossom Music Center	—N/a	—N/a
July 11, 1991	Grove City	United States	Capitol Music Center	—N/a	—N/a
July 13, 1991	Burgettstown	United States	Coca-Cola Star Lake Amphitheater	10,763 / 20,089	$208,566
July 14, 1991	Richmond	United States	Richmond Coliseum	—N/a	—N/a
July 16, 1991	Columbia	United States	Merriweather Post Pavilion	—N/a	—N/a
July 17, 1991	Providence	United States	Providence Civic Center	7,012 / 12,000	$164,782
July 19, 1991	Philadelphia	United States	The Spectrum	—N/a	—N/a
July 20, 1991	Hershey	United States	Hersheypark Stadium	—N/a	—N/a
July 21, 1991	Saratoga Springs	United States	Saratoga Performing Arts Center	—N/a	—N/a
July 23, 1991	New York City	United States	Madison Square Garden	13,850 / 14,000	$401,773
July 26, 1991	East Rutherford	United States	Brendan Byrne Arena	—N/a	—N/a
July 27, 1991	Cincinnati	United States	Riverfront Stadium		—N/a
July 29, 1991	Lenox	United States	Tanglewood	—N/a	—N/a
July 30, 1991	Hopewell	United States	Finger Lakes Performing Arts Center	—N/a	—N/a
August 2, 1991	Buffalo	United States	Buffalo Memorial Auditorium	—N/a	—N/a
August 3, 1991	Hartford	United States	Hartford Civic Center	—N/a	—N/a
August 6, 1991	Mansfield	United States	Great Woods Performing Arts Center	—N/a	—N/a
August 7, 1991	Mansfield	United States	Great Woods Performing Arts Center	—N/a	—N/a
August 9, 1991	Old Orchard Beach	United States	Seashore Performing Arts Center	—N/a	—N/a
August 10, 1991	Nashua	United States	Holman Stadium	—N/a	—N/a
Europe				—N/a	—N/a
August 27, 1991	Birmingham	England	NEC Arena	—N/a	—N/a
August 28, 1991	Birmingham	England	NEC Arena	—N/a	—N/a
August 29, 1991	Birmingham	England	NEC Arena	—N/a	—N/a
August 30, 1991	Birmingham	England	NEC Arena	—N/a	—N/a
August 31, 1991	Birmingham	England	NEC Arena	—N/a	—N/a
September 1, 1991	Birmingham	England	NEC Arena	—N/a	—N/a
September 3, 1991	London	England	Wembley Arena	—N/a	—N/a
September 4, 1991	London	England	Wembley Arena	—N/a	—N/a
September 6, 1991	London	England	Wembley Arena	—N/a	—N/a
September 7, 1991	London	England	Wembley Arena	—N/a	—N/a
September 9, 1991	London	England	Wembley Arena	—N/a	—N/a
September 10, 1991	London	England	Wembley Arena	—N/a	—N/a
September 11, 1991	London	England	Wembley Arena	—N/a	—N/a
September 13, 1991	London	England	Wembley Arena	—N/a	—N/a
September 14, 1991	London	England	Wembley Arena	—N/a	—N/a
September 15, 1991	London	England	Wembley Arena	—N/a	—N/a
September 17, 1991	Glasgow	Scotland	Scottish Exhibition and Conference Centre	—N/a	—N/a
September 18, 1991	Glasgow	Scotland	Scottish Exhibition and Conference Centre	—N/a	—N/a
September 19, 1991	Glasgow	Scotland	Scottish Exhibition and Conference Centre	—N/a	—N/a
September 21, 1991	Rotterdam	Netherlands	Ahoy Sportpaleis	—N/a	—N/a
September 22, 1991	Rotterdam	Netherlands	Ahoy Sportpaleis	—N/a	—N/a
September 23, 1991	Rotterdam	Netherlands	Ahoy Sportpaleis	—N/a	—N/a
September 25, 1991	Rotterdam	Netherlands	Ahoy Sportpaleis	—N/a	—N/a
September 26, 1991	Rotterdam	Netherlands	Ahoy Sportpaleis	—N/a	—N/a
September 27, 1991	Rotterdam	Netherlands	Ahoy Sportpaleis	—N/a	—N/a
September 29, 1991	A Coruña	Spain	Coliseum da Coruña	—N/a	—N/a
September 30, 1991	Frankfurt	Germany	Festhalle Frankfurt	—N/a	—N/a
October 1, 1991	Paris	France	Palais Omnisports de Paris-Bercy	—N/a	—N/a
October 2, 1991	Paris	France	Palais Omnisports de Paris-Bercy	—N/a	—N/a

Festivals and other miscellaneous performances

^{[A]}Summerfest

Cancellations and rescheduled shows

May 13, 1991	Mountain View, California	Shoreline Amphitheatre	Cancelled
June 22, 1991	Maryland Heights, Missouri	Riverport Amphitheatre	Cancelled
June 23, 1991	Kansas City, Missouri	Starlight Theatre	Cancelled
June 25, 1991	Omaha, Nebraska	Omaha Civic Auditorium	Cancelled
July 5, 1991	Hampton, Virginia	Hampton Coliseum	Cancelled
August 11, 1991	Moncton, Canada	Magnetic Hill Concert Site	Cancelled
August 13, 1991	Halifax, Canada	Halifax Metro Centre	Cancelled
August 15, 1991	Montreal, Canada	Montreal Forum	Cancelled
August 16, 1991	Ottawa, Canada	Lansdowne Park	Cancelled
August 17, 1991	Toronto, Canada	CNE Grandstand	Cancelled

== Personnel ==
Band

- Musical director / bass guitar / bass synthesizer – Rickey Minor
- Guitar – Ray Fuller
- Keyboard: Michael Bearden
- Drums – Ricky Lawson
- Keyboard – Bette Sussman
- Saxophone – Kirk Whalum
- Keyboard – Kevin Lee
- Percussion – Bashiri Johnson
- Background vocalists – Gary Houston, Vonchita Rawls, Carmen Rawls, Tiawana Rawls

Choreography Choreographer – Khandi Alexander

Dancers

- Diesko Boyland, Bryant Cash-Welch, Jonathan Webbe, Luca Tommassini

Tour Management

- Manager – Tony Bulluck
