= I'm Your Baby Tonight =

Studio album by Whitney Houston
- Released: November 6, 1990
- Recorded: October 1989 – September 1990
- Studios: Axis (New York City); Elumba (Los Angeles); LaCoCo (Atlanta); Tarpan (San Rafael); A&M (Los Angeles); The Plant (Sausalito); Ocean Way (Los Angeles); Right Track (New York City); The Hit Factory (New York City); Wonderland (Los Angeles); Sigma (New York); Westlake (Los Angeles); Soundworks West (Los Angeles); Emerald Sound (Nashville); The Reflections (Nashville); Nightingdale (Nashville)
- Genres: New jack swing; dance; R&B
- Length: 53:45
- Label: Arista
- Producers: Houston; Babyface; L.A. Reid; Luther Vandross; Michael Masser; Narada Michael Walden; Rickey Minor; Stevie Wonder

Whitney Houston chronology
Whitney (1987)	I'm Your Baby Tonight (1990)	The Bodyguard: Original Soundtrack Album (1992)

Singles from I'm Your Baby Tonight
- 1. "I'm Your Baby Tonight" Released: September 28, 1990; 2. "All the Man That I Need" Released: December 4, 1990; 3. "Miracle" Released: April 16, 1991; 4. "My Name Is Not Susan" Released: June 17, 1991; 5. "I Belong to You" Released: October 18, 1991; 6. "We Didn't Know" Released: April 14, 1992

I'm Your Baby Tonight is the third studio album by American singer Whitney Houston. It was released on November 6, 1990, by Arista Records. Released during a time black music critics accused Houston of neglecting her R&B and soul music roots following the release of her pop-heavy eponymous second album, Whitney, three years before, the album signaled a change in Houston's musical direction as she attained creative control for the first time in her career and received an executive producer credit. The record incorporated the then-current popular sound of new jack swing music along with elements of hip-hop, funk and dance, which helped to shift Houston's focus from love ballads and occasional dance songs to creating a "firmer dance record". The album was further credited later as a "turning point" in Houston's career and which helped to cement her legacy in popular music.

Its sexually aggressive and assertive themes also took a more mature direction than on Houston's previous albums with songs such as the title track, "My Name Is Not Susan" and "I Belong to You". It was the first album to feature production from the team of Antonio "L.A." Reid and Kenneth "Babyface" Edmonds, who would produce four of the album's songs including the title track, "Miracle" and "My Name Is Not Susan", while Houston maintained her previous producer Narada Michael Walden on several other tracks with smaller contributions from Michael Masser, Luther Vandross and Stevie Wonder, the latter of whom Houston sung with on the album's only duet track, "We Didn't Know". In addition to vocally arranging every track, Houston also added to the production on the record on at least one track, the album closer, "I'm Knockin'".

Upon its release, I'm Your Baby Tonight received mixed to positive reviews from critics, with some complimenting the album's more earthy forms of black music, while others viewed this shift as superficial. The album became a global commercial success upon its release, reaching number three on the Billboard 200, whilst staying inside the top ten of that chart for 22 weeks. The same album topped the Top R&B Albums chart, Houston's first album to reach the pole position on that chart since her groundbreaking self-titled debut album, accumulating eight cumulative weeks atop the chart, outperforming the six-week run from her debut. Following its peaks on the Billboard 200 and Top R&B Albums chart, Houston became the first female artist to have their first three albums reach the top three on both charts. It would top the year-end 1991 lists of Billboard and Cashbox magazine as the top selling R&B album of the year. It would become Houston's third consecutive multi-platinum album in the United States, eventually selling more than four million copies alone in the country and being certified platinum four times by the Recording Industry Association of America (RIAA).

The album would go on to win four Billboard Music Awards, including Top R&B Album, at the second annual ceremony and earned the American Music Award nomination for Favorite Soul/R&B Album as well as the Soul Train Music Award nomination for Best Female R&B/Soul Album in 1992 as well as several NAACP Image Award nominations and the American Black Achievement Award as the top music artist of the year.

In addition to its US success, the album was also a worldwide hit, reaching the top ten in 18 other countries and peaked at number two on the European Top 100 Albums chart, earning her third top five album on that chart, while being certified platinum in the UK, Canada, Australia, Germany, France and the Netherlands, as well as multi-platinum in Japan and Spain, eventually being certified in over 13 countries and would reach global sales of over ten million copies, becoming one of the best-selling female albums of all time.

I'm Your Baby Tonight produced six singles. Its lead single, the title track, hit number one in four countries, including the US Billboard Hot 100 and reached the top ten in 13 other countries and earning a Grammy Award nomination for Best Female Pop Vocal Performance in 1991. "All the Man That I Need" followed the title track to number one on the Billboard Hot 100 and helped to establish a chart record for Houston being the first woman to have multiple chart-toppers off three or more albums while also achieving international success, topping the Canadian RPM chart and hitting the top 20 in the UK; it would be nominated for the Grammy for Best Female Pop Vocal Performance in 1992. "Miracle" also achieved US success, peaking inside the top ten, while "My Name Is Not Susan" reached the top 20 of the Billboard Hot 100.

The remaining two singles — "I Belong to You" and "We Didn't Know" — was only released to R&B retail and radio where it found R&B chart success, both peaking inside the top 20 while the former reached the R&B top ten and earned a Grammy nomination for Best Female R&B Vocal Performance. To further promote the album, Houston embarked on her third concert tour, titled the I'm Your Baby Tonight World Tour, from March 1991 until October 1991. During promotion of the album, Houston's status was raised by her Super Bowl XXV appearance where she performed her rendition of "The Star-Spangled Banner" and the HBO TV special, Welcome Home Heroes with Whitney Houston, which included songs from the album performed and viewed by over 50 million viewers.

== Background ==
That is me. It's been the real Whitney all along. This album was not a real effort to bring me back anywhere. It really does say something to me when they say my songs aren't black enough. I sang, and I arranged a lot of stuff that I did. Black people have no barriers — we can do anything.

— Whitney Houston (1991)

In 1987, Whitney Houston released her sophomore album, Whitney, which was aimed to give her a more accessible pop audience in contrast to the R&B and love ballad material composed on Houston's self-titled debut (1985). The record made history for Houston as she became the first female artist to debut at number one on the Billboard 200 and produced four consecutive number one singles on the Billboard Hot 100 — a record at a time for a female artist. The album also cemented her reputation as a global superstar, with her two albums selling a combined thirty million units by 1989. Her successful crossover blend of pop, R&B and gospel helped Houston to break racial barriers on pop radio stations and MTV, which along with the commercial breakthrough of Michael Jackson, led to the music industry enjoying "the best time for crossover artists since the height of disco in the mid-to-late '70s", according to journalist Frank Rizzo in 1987.

Despite this, however, some black critics began to voice their disapproval of Houston's music, especially with her sophomore release, Whitney, which included the number-one hits "I Wanna Dance with Somebody (Who Loves Me)" and "So Emotional". These critics accused the singer of "selling out" by neglecting black musical influences in favor of music intended to appeal to white audiences. They also felt that her records lacked the soul of her live performances of the same songs. Houston's name was jeered by some in the audience at the Soul Train Music Awards ceremonies of 1988 and 1989 after her name was announced as nominee in several categories.

Houston defended herself against the criticism telling Essence magazine in 1990, "If you're gonna have a long career, there's a certain way to do it and I did it that way. I'm not ashamed of it." Later on, Houston steadfastly denied claims that her R&B base had deserted her to Billboard magazine. Around this time period, Houston was also criticized for her supposed "lack of rhythm", as displayed in the In Living Color parody "Whitney Houston's Rhythmless Nation", in which "Houston" (played in the skit by Kim Wayans) sang to the tune of Janet Jackson's "Rhythm Nation" and demonstrated her struggles to dance. Houston was annoyed by the skit, saying "don't say I don't have soul or what you consider to be 'blackness'... I know what my color is. I was raised in a black community with black people, so that has never been a thing with me."

Houston and label head Clive Davis had discussed plans to go into a more urban direction as early as the spring of 1988 as popular music was starting to embrace a new urban pop genre called new jack swing. Even as her sophomore album Whitney was blanketing airwaves that year, music industry insiders were speculating that "[t]here is talk her next album will have a 'black direction'."

Houston decided to assert more creative control of her music and became an executive producer for the first time on an album. At the time, Houston was seen by some in the music industry as an artist that was being controlled by Davis, an accusation Houston took offense to. In later years, Houston remarked to Rolling Stone, "I don't like it when they see me as this little person who doesn't know what to do with herself -- like I have no idea what I want, like I'm a puppet and Clive's got the strings." Houston convinced Davis to hire the new jack swing production team of L.A. Reid and Babyface, citing their work on artists such as Bobby Brown, Karyn White and The Whispers among others.

== Music and production ==
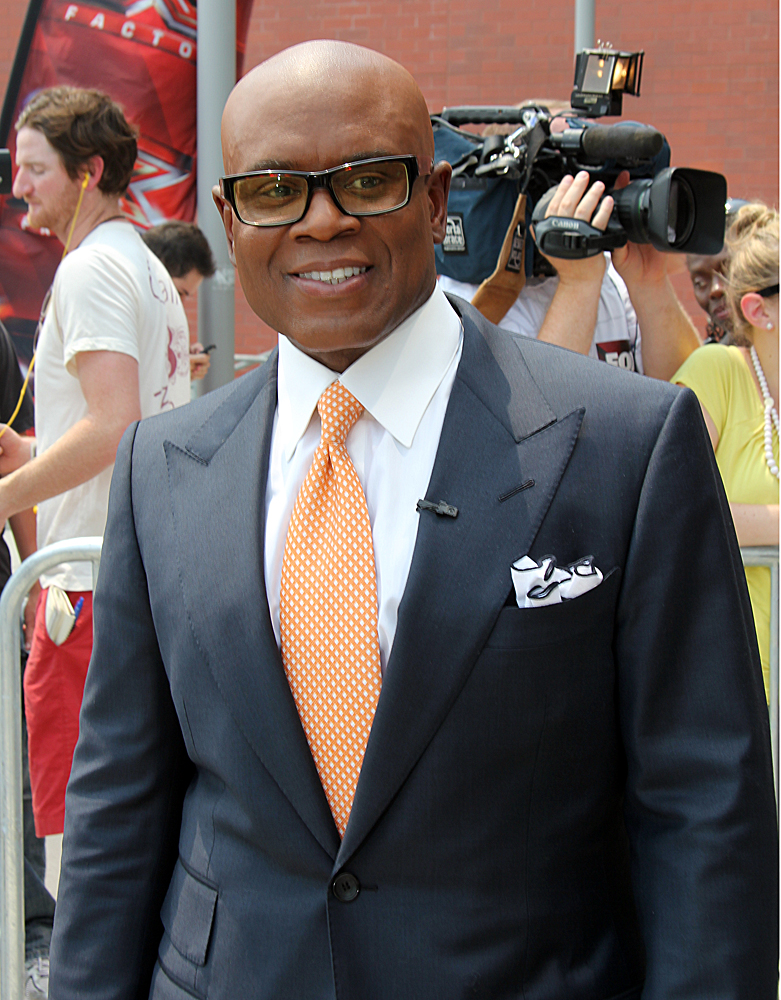
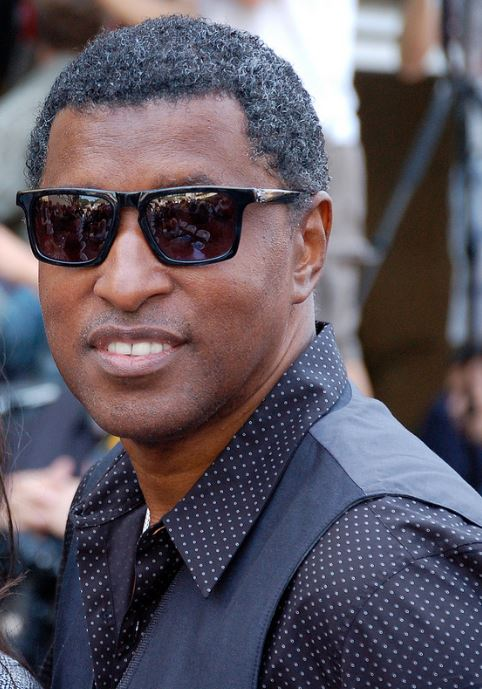
L.A. Reid (left) and Babyface (right) were brought in to produce I'm Your Baby Tonight.

For more than a year, following the end of her Moment of Truth World Tour in November 1988, Houston took a break from public events with few occasions. During the break, Houston contributed vocals to two songs on gospel sibling duo BeBe & CeCe Winans' breakthrough album Heaven. She also contributed duet vocals on Aretha Franklin's Through the Storm on the song "It Isn't, It Wasn't, It Ain't Never Gonna Be", which became a moderate Billboard hit, peaking inside the top 50 of the Billboard Hot 100 and reached the top five of the Billboard Hot Black Singles chart in 1989, later earning the pair a nomination for the Grammy Award for Best R&B Performance by a Duo or Group with Vocals at the 32nd Annual Grammy Awards. With encouragement from BeBe Winans, Houston co-composed the dance song, "Takin' a Chance", in which Houston took advantage of adding more gospel vocal embellishments than she had been allowed to. Houston later sent the song to Sanyo in Japan and filmed commercials for the Japanese audience. In October 1989, the song was issued as a Japan-only single and found success on its Oricon Singles Chart.

Work on the album began in October 1989 with longtime collaborator Narada Michael Walden, primarily at Manhattan's Right Track Recording. Before the recording, Walden and frequent collaborator Preston Glass presented five compositions that were subsequently rejected by Arista Records brass, which surprised Walden, whose work on the Whitney album had led him to win the Grammy Award for Producer of the Year at the 30th Annual Grammy Awards. Arista eventually allowed Walden to produce at least six songs submitted to the label.

One of the first songs recorded was "Feels So Good", followed by "I Belong to You". The songs, which Walden arranged in a quiet storm format, were influenced by Motown artist Marvin Gaye. The songs were recorded in the middle of Houston's breakup with comedic actor Eddie Murphy. By the time the pair reconvened to record "All the Man That I Need", a song originally recorded by Linda Clifford that December, however, he said the "fog" that Houston was under had left her and she was happier, which Walden later learned was due to her growing relationship with fellow pop singer Bobby Brown.

"All the Man That I Need" (originally titled "All the Man I Need") had been pitched to Houston back in 1987 by its co-writer Dean Pitchford. But at the time it couldn't be recorded because Houston had finished work on the Whitney album. Houston and Walden eventually worked on three more recordings for the album -- "Dancin' on the Smooth Edge", a jazz-inflected Sam Dees number called "Lover for Life" and a funk and gospel-inspired rendition of Steve Winwood's "Higher Love".

In between the Walden recordings, Houston reunited with Michael Masser and Gerry Goffin on two songs -- "After We Make Love" and "Far Enough for Love", the latter co-written with Leon Ware. Houston also recorded a new jack swing-styled song lent to her by Luther Vandross called "Who Do You Love" and recorded the duet "We Didn't Know" with Stevie Wonder at Wonder's Wonderland Studios in Los Angeles. Houston also contributed production on a song for the first time in her career with the song "I'm Knockin'", co-written by her musical director Rickey Minor and BeBe Winans.

In March 1990, Houston began working with Reid and Babyface at Elumba Studios in Hollywood. The offer to work with Houston came after the duo was trying to negotiate with Davis to distribute recordings released under their recently formed record label, LaFace Records, which the two founded in December 1989. Davis agreed to distribute the label as long as they agreed to work with Houston, which the duo obliged.

Reid and Babyface first presented Houston with the song that would be the album's title track, "I'm Your Baby Tonight", and arranged in a way that was similar to a jazz or funk vocalist. The song's sexually aggressive lyrics were a departure for the artist. Originally, the song only had one bridge but Reid requested another bridge near the end of the song. Houston shocked the producers by delivering the song in a single take. According to reports, Houston's single-take recording was due to Houston going to a Hollywood shopping mall to find a pair of high-heeled shoes Houston had seen earlier that day before the mall closed. The trio of Houston, Reid and Babyface further collaborated on three more songs — two more asserted hip-hop influenced tracks "My Name Is Not Susan" and "Anymore" and the soul ballad, "Miracle". Later, with Nat Adderley Jr., Houston produced a second song, "Love Is", written for her by Carvin Winans.

In the final track listing of the album, "Higher Love", "Dancin' on the Smooth Edge", "Feels So Good" and "Far Enough for Love" as well as "Love Is" were cut out from the album due to, Walden claims, the label pushing the production of Reid and Babyface over the other producers. "Dancin' on the Smooth Edge" and "Feels So Good" would be featured as b-sides on commercial singles while "Takin' a Chance" and "Higher Love" were placed in Japan-only issues of the album.

"Far Enough for Love" was later remixed by producer Rodney Jerkins as "Far Enough" and was issued on the Houston estate-approved biopic, Whitney Houston: I Wanna Dance with Somebody while "Love Is", which Houston performed live on the South African portion of her Bodyguard World Tour, was finally issued on the posthumous live album, The Concert for a New South Africa (Durban). By September, the album was finished and Arista set a November release for the album.

== Critical reception ==
Professional ratings
Review scores
Source	Rating
AllMusic	2/5 stars
The Baltimore Sun	(negative)
Entertainment Weekly	D+
Los Angeles Times	2.5/4 stars
Rolling Stone	3/5 stars
(The New) Rolling Stone Album Guide	1.5/5 stars
Smash Hits	5/10

Upon its release in 1990, the album received mixed reviews from music critics. David Browne of Entertainment Weekly called the album "the most perfectly realized Houston work to date", comparing it to her first two albums where, Browne argues, were "spoon-fed generic pop-R&B" that were "at best, patchwork quilts juxtaposing bouncy dance tracks and ballads that could have been lifted from late-night help-an-orphan TV ads", while I'm Your Baby Tonight by comparison, "adhere[d] doggedly to one agenda: to prove Houston is a get-down, funky human being who can party with the best of them. The album is relentlessly superficial — and proud of it." Browne concluded that the album is “utterly without content, both musically and lyrically”.

In his review for the Los Angeles Times, Chris William raves the title track, writing that it was "a swooning ballad of complete romantic acquiescence, with the beat magnified to dance-floor level--a memorable song charming enough to click arranged in any number of genres, but especially seductive done up with that energy." He further compares the uptempo tracks on the album to the then current work of R&B group En Vogue, while calling the tracks Vandross and Wonder produced for her as "engaging, if far from classic".

By contrast, James Hunter of Rolling Stone wrote that the album was her "... best and most integrated album" and an album that "amounts to a case study in how much [Houston] can get out of her luscious and straightforward vocal gifts within a dancepop framework". Hunter also claims that with Walden, Houston "refines two of her signature styles: state-of-the-art dance pop and baroque ballads." In reviewing the second single, "All the Man That I Need", Hunter writes the ballad was "an outsize ballad about poverty and damaged self-regard, so expertly that the song, with its effective whiff of Spanish guitar, stages undeniable pop drama." Of Reid and Babyface, Hunter writes that the pair "take a more youthful tack", stating their "sharp recastings of Seventies black pop and funk bop set against thumping Eighties dance rhythms are lean, mean and virtually invisible compared with Walden's arrangements", further stating that tracks like "My Name Is Not Susan" and "Anymore" have " led her into new, less formal territory, where she sheds her gowns, swings and sounds confident, rhythmically challenged and very much at home."

In its review of the album, Time wrote that Houston "comes within striking distance of classic saloon soul here and proves she's stepping up to fast company." In a positive review, Q wrote, "at the age of 27, Whitney Houston has the world at her feet and a string of supremely impressive statistics to her name... her seemingly effortless range and phrasing turn an up-beat blubber of a tune into instantly seductive high class pop soul of the first order... there is no doubting that this album confirms her right to sit atop her own particular pile."

According to AllMusic's Ashley S. Battel, Houston "attempts to make a larger foray into dance music" with this album, while J. D. Considine wrote that Houston's singing on the album features "sultry moans, note-bending asides, [and] window-rattling gospel shouts". Rolling Stone magazine's Jim Macnie said that the album "displayed a slick R&B edge" and features "funk-and-dance-driven pop".

== Commercial performance ==
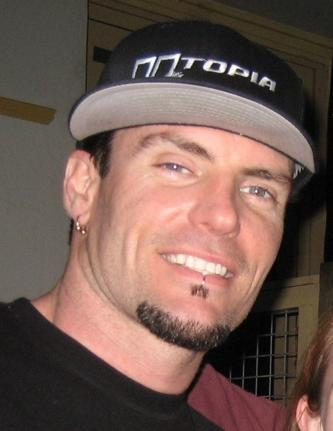
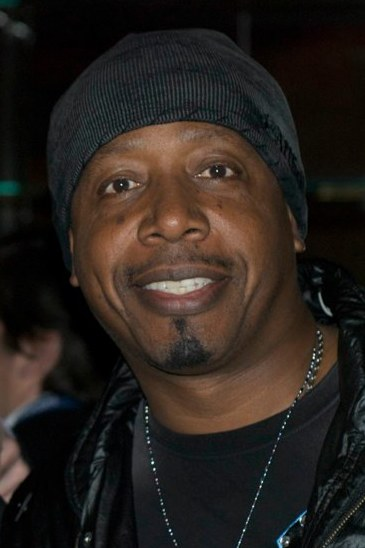
Rappers Vanilla Ice (left) and MC Hammer (right) kept I'm Your Baby Tonight from reaching the summit of the Billboard 200 with their respective albums To The Extreme and Please Hammer, Don't Hurt 'Em.

In the United States, I'm Your Baby Tonight debuted at number 22 on the Billboard 200 chart, for the issue dated November 24, 1990. In its second week, it leapt to number five; the following week on December 8 saw its peak position, at number three behind Vanilla Ice's To the Extreme and MC Hammer's Please Hammer, Don't Hurt 'Em. The album spent 22 weeks inside the top ten and was on the chart for a total of 51 weeks. It also debuted at number 10 on the Billboard Top R&B Albums chart, the issue date of December 1, 1990, and reached the number one position of that chart three weeks later. The record was at the top of the R&B/Hip-Hop chart for eight non-consecutive weeks, and was present on that chart for a total of 53 weeks.

Due to its great performance on the R&B chart, it became the best-selling R&B album of 1991. The album was certified platinum four times by the Recording Industry Association of America on April 5, 1995, and since Nielsen SoundScan began tracking sales data in May 1991, it has sold — as of 2009 — an additional 1,728,000 copies in the United States; this numerical amount does not include copies sold in the initial months of the album's release or its sales through mail-order sources such as Columbia House or BMG Music Club. This is not its sales total, as the biggest portion of the sales occurred in November 1990, before there was Nielsen SoundScan. Houston made history by becoming the first solo artist to take their first three albums to the top five of the Billboard 200, a record later matched by singer Britney Spears, who took her first three studio albums — ...Baby One More Time, Oops!... I Did It Again and Britney — to number one on the Billboard 200.

Though sales of the album were smaller compared to Houston's first two albums, I'm Your Baby Tonight was a hit internationally, boosting Houston to global super-stardom. In Britain, it entered the UK Albums Chart at number 6 on November 17, 1990, and peaked at number 4, nine weeks later. The British Phonographic Industry (BPI) certified the album platinum, for shipments of 300,000 units, on November 1, 1990. In Germany, the album peaked at number three on the Media Control Albums Chart, receiving platinum certification (for shipments of 500,000 copies), by the Bundesverband Musikindustrie, in 1991. It also reached the top five in other countries, such as Austria, Norway, Sweden, and Switzerland. To date, the album has sold approximately 10 million copies worldwide.

== Singles ==
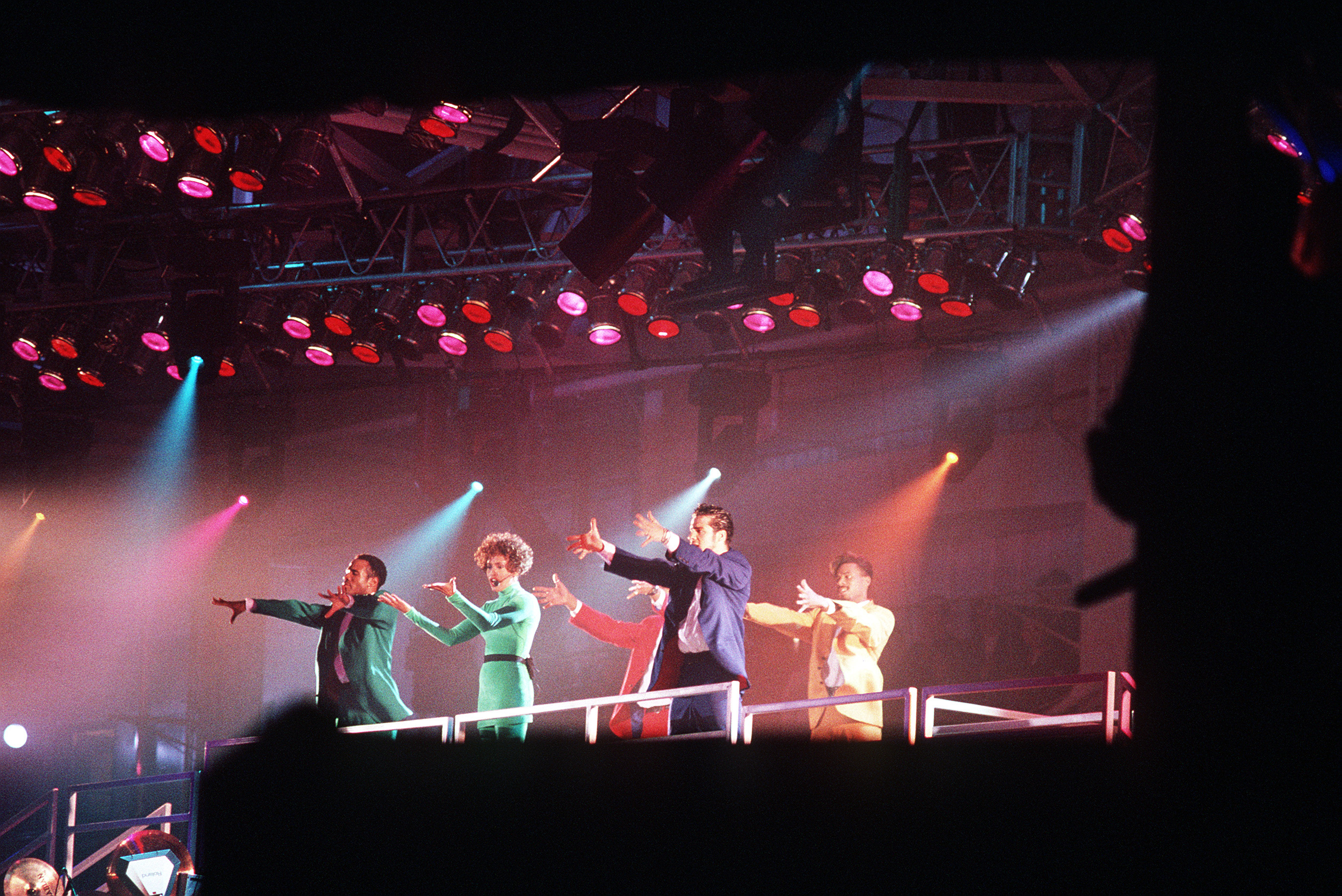
Houston performing during the Welcome Home Heroes concert.

I'm Your Baby Tonight produced six singles between September 1990 and April 1992.

The first single, "I'm Your Baby Tonight", peaked at number one on the Billboard Hot 100 on December 1, 1990, staying for a week. On the same day, the song also topped the Hot R&B Singles chart for two weeks, marking the first time in four years that Houston topped the chart. It was also a top ten hit on the Adult Contemporary chart, peaking at number 7, staying on the chart for 28 weeks. The song, through its Yvonne Turner mix, reached the top twenty of the Dance Club Songs chart, peaking at number 17, becoming the album's sole charter on the dance charts. Houston was nominated for the Grammy Award for Best Pop Vocal Performance, Female with this track at the 33rd Annual Grammy Awards of 1991.

This success was repeated with the follow-up single, "All the Man That I Need", which reached the pole position of the Billboard Hot 100 on February 23, 1991, accumulating two weeks atop the chart. The song would reach number one on both the R&B and adult contemporary charts on March 2, marking her first triple-crown Billboard number one hit since 1986. Houston received a nomination for Best Pop Vocal Performance, Female at the 34th Annual Grammy Awards in 1992, which was her fifth nomination in that category. With this success, Houston made history as the first solo female act to produce multiple number ones off three or more albums.

The third single, "Miracle", became the album's third top ten single on all three Billboard charts, reaching number nine on the Hot 100 on June 8. It would reach numbers two and four respectively on the R&B and AC charts later that month.

The fourth single, "My Name is Not Susan" peaked inside the top 20 of the Hot 100 in September, breaking Houston's streak of thirteen consecutive top ten hits, still the third most by a female artist after Janet Jackson and Madonna. On the R&B chart, it became a top ten hit, peaking at number eight that same month. The song is notable for including a remix featuring British female rapper Monie Love, marking one of the first times a female rapper guest starred on a remix of a pop song, predating Janet Jackson's future collaboration with female rapper MC Lyte on a remix of her 1994 hit "You Want This".

The last two singles - "I Belong to You" and "We Didn't Know" - were only released and promoted to R&B retail and radio, with the former reaching number ten on the R&B singles chart in February 1992 and earning a nomination for the Grammy Award for Best Female R&B Vocal Performance at the 35th Annual Grammy Awards. The latter peaked inside the top 20 on July 4, 1992.

Houston's success with the first four singles resulted in her being respectively ranked the third top pop singles and top R&B singles artist of 1991, according to Billboard. Houston was also ranked the top female crossover artist of the year on Cashbox magazine.

Globally, the title track became a smash following European promotion. In Italy, it reached number one on the Musica e dischi singles chart in November 1990 and remained atop for five weeks. In the United Kingdom, the single entered the UK Singles Chart at number sixteen on October 20, 1990, and peaked at number five two weeks later, becoming her eighth top ten hit. It also reached the top five in many countries such as Austria, Belgium, France, Germany, the Netherlands, Norway, Sweden and Switzerland. It also went top ten in Australia and Ireland. Like the title track, "All the Man That I Need" achieved global success, but on a smaller scale. It reached number one on the Canadian RPM Top 100 Singles chart for one week and number ten on Belgian VRT Top 30 chart. The ballad reached the top twenty in Ireland, the Netherlands and the United Kingdom. Included on the tracklisting of the album's Japanese edition is a cover of Steve Winwood's "Higher Love", which was resurrected by Norwegian DJ Kygo in 2019, and "Takin' a Chance"; the latter became a success in the country.

== Promotion and appearances ==
During the months of November and December 1990, Houston appeared and performed on several European shows to promote the album. Returning home to the United States in December following the album's release, Houston appeared on The Arsenio Hall Show on December 4 to perform "All the Man That I Need" and "We Didn't Know" with Stevie Wonder. A week later, Houston appeared on The Tonight Show Starring Johnny Carson for the first time since December 1985, with Jay Leno as a guest host. On the show, she performed "All the Man That I Need" along with "Do You Hear What I Hear?". On January 4, 1991, Houston returned to The Arsenio Hall Show where she performed "I'm Your Baby Tonight". On February 23, Houston made her debut on Saturday Night Live as the musical guest and performed "I'm Your Baby Tonight" and "All the Man That I Need"; on the same day she performed on the show, the latter song had hit number one on the pop charts.

Following her iconic and memorable rendition of "The Star-Spangled Banner" at Super Bowl XXV, Houston headlined her first HBO-TV concert, Welcome Home Heroes with Whitney Houston, performing for members of the US armed forces returning from the Persian Gulf War, where she performed five of the album's tracks in the show, which would be seen by over 50 million viewers, becoming the most watched HBO concert in history at the time. On May 12, while on her tour, a performance of Houston's at the Oakland Arena in Oakland, California was simulcasted on the MTV concert tour, The Simple Truth: A Concert for Kurdish Refugees, a five-hour telethon that broadcast in 36 countries, raising $15 million to aid the Kurds. Houston performed "My Name Is Not Susan", "Miracle" and "Greatest Love of All" during the broadcast. On June 23, 1991, a Houston show at the Greensboro Coliseum of her performing "I'm Your Baby Tonight" was shown on the Fox TV special, Coca-Cola Pop Music Backstage Pass to Summer highlighting several rock concerts of that year, including Houston's.

On December 4, 1991, nearly two months after the end of her world tour to promote the album and while shooting her first film, The Bodyguard, Houston performed at the second annual 1991 Billboard Music Awards after being announced by her cousin, American singer Dionne Warwick. There, she performed a medley of "Lover Man (Oh, Where Can You Be?)", "My Man" and "All the Man That I Need"; afterwards, she received her four Billboard Music Awards for the album. On January 27, 1992, Houston performed a medley of "I'm Your Baby Tonight", "My Name Is Not Susan" and "Who Do You Love" at the 19th American Music Awards, after being introduced by MC Hammer. On February 16, Houston appeared at the taping of the Muhammad Ali's 50th Birthday Celebration to honor the boxer's 50th birthday where she dedicated "Greatest Love of All" to him. She later join Diana Ross and other celebrities onstage to sing a duet of "You've Got a Friend" at the end of the show. On May 6, 1992, Houston had her first TV special, Whitney Houston: This Is My Life, which featured eight of her performances at the Coliseum da Coruña in A Coruña, Galicia, Spain, taken on September 29, 1991, along with rehearsal performances of the gospel tune "This Day" and "Greatest Love of All".

== Tour ==
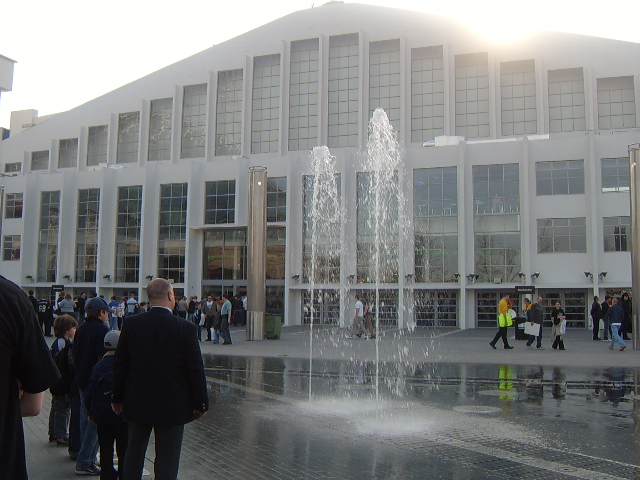
Houston broke her previous concert record of nine shows at London's Wembley Arena with ten during the I'm Your Baby Tonight World Tour in 1991.

On March 14 and 15, 1991, Houston launched what would be a 97-date world tour at the Yokohama Arena in Yokohama, Japan. It would be her only two performances in Asia. On March 31, she took the stage at the Norfolk Naval Base in Norfolk, Virginia to perform for over 3,500 American troops returning from the Persian Gulf War for her Welcome Home Heroes with Whitney Houston HBO concert. At the time, the show was the most watched concert in its history, viewed by over 50 million viewers after the channel agreed to air the concert for free, rather than have it be a pay-per-view concert.

The tour was then formally launched at the Thompson–Boling Arena in Knoxville, Tennessee almost a full month later, on April 18. The show was different from Houston's previous tours where she had performed without many theatrics compared to her contemporaries. For this tour, however, she performed with male backup dancers and was surrounded by pyrotechnics. In addition, Houston began wearing catsuits designed for her by South African fashion designer Marc Bouwer.

The North American leg of the tour was plagued by ticket price rises during the 1991 recession, which led to many pop and rock concerts sometimes performing in front of half-filled arenas and stadiums. Houston would perform 66 dates throughout North America. During the Canadian stops of the tour, Houston had to cancel several dates due to a vocal injury.

After resuming the rest of the tour in the States, she headed off to Europe where she performed six shows at the NEC Arena in Birmingham, England between August 27 and September 1. Then, starting from September 3 through September 15, Houston performed a record-setting ten shows at London's Wembley Arena outdoing her previous tour's record of nine. Houston also performed a series of shows at the Scottish Exhibition and Conference Centre in Glasgow, the Rotterdam Ahoy in Rotterdam, Netherlands where she performed six straight dates, as well as the Coliseum da Coruña in A Coruña, Spain, the Festhalle Frankfurt in Frankfurt, Germany and two shows at the Palais Omnisports de Paris-Bercy in Paris, where she ended the tour on October 2. Unlike the North American leg, Houston's 29 tour dates in Europe were all sold out.

== Accolades ==
Houston received several awards and nominations for her work on the album. For three consecutive Grammy Award ceremonies, three songs — "I'm Your Baby Tonight", "All the Man That I Need" and "I Belong to You" — all received Grammy nominations. The former two won Houston nominations in the Best Female Pop Vocal Performance at the 1991 and 1992 ceremonies respectively, while the latter ballad earned her a nomination in the Best Female R&B Vocal Performance category in 35th annual ceremony in 1993. At the 1992 American Music Awards, Houston received four nominations including Favorite Soul/R&B Album, while also receiving Favorite Female Artist nods in the pop, R&B and adult contemporary fields.

At the 1992 NAACP Image Awards, Houston received two nominations, including Outstanding Female Artist. Houston received a nomination for the Brit Award for International Female Solo Artist at the Brit Awards 1991. At the 1992 Soul Train Music Awards, Houston won two nominations including Best R&B/Soul Album - Female for the album while "All the Man That I Need" received a nomination for Best R&B/Soul Single - Female. For her performance on the Welcome Home Heroes concert, Houston won the CableACE Award for Best Performance in a Music Special or Series, while the show itself received the nomination for Best Music Special. In December 1991, Houston won four Billboard Music Awards, including Top R&B Album and Top R&B Artist; while accepting her wins from cousin Dionne Warwick, Houston held one of the trophies and yelled, "yeah, how you like me now?!", probably in response to critics who derided her for "not being black enough". The following month, in January 1992, Houston was the recipient of the Music Award at the American Black Achievement Awards for her accomplishments during 1991, including the release of the I'm Your Baby Tonight album and its subsequent tour as well as Houston's performance of "The Star-Spangled Banner" performed at Super Bowl XXV.

At the time of its release, the "I'm Your Baby Tonight" single was one of Houston's fastest-selling singles to date, pushing half a million pure copies, leading to a gold certification from the Recording Industry Association of America (RIAA) on November 27, 1990; on January 27, 2023, the same song was re-certified platinum for stream and sales equivalent units of a million copies. Similarly, "All the Man That I Need" sold brisk sales as well following its December 1990 release, pushing half a million physical copies by March 1991, earning a gold RIAA certification on March 21 of the year and later being re-certified platinum for stream and sales equivalent units of a million copies on August 9, 2021, Houston's 58th birthday.

The album itself sold brisk sales initially, shipping two million copies by January 1991, two months after its official release in the United States and would receive gold, platinum and double platinum certifications on January 15. Four months after that, on May 2, it was certified triple-platinum for sales of three million copies. On April 5, 1995, the album was re-certified 4× platinum for sales of four million.

For the 1991 year-end list on Billboard, I'm Your Baby Tonight was ranked the tenth best-selling album of the year, higher than Houston's last album, Whitney, which ranked as the twelfth best-selling album of 1988. On other pop album fields, Houston was the sixth top selling pop artist, the eleventh top albums artist and third top female albums artist. On pop single fields, she was ranked the third top selling pop artist of the year and the second top selling female singles artist behind Mariah Carey. "All the Man That I Need" was ranked the 18th and 3rd best-selling R&B and adult contemporary single of the year respectively. On the adult contemporary field, Houston was ranked in sixth place.

== Legacy ==
According to Kelly Rowland, the singer got in the group Destiny's Child after auditioning for the group by singing the title track; Rowland revealed this information as a guest advisor on the thirteenth season of The Voice in 2017. The title track became the first number one pop single for its producers L.A. Reid and Babyface and helped to play a part in the success of LaFace Records, which Arista distributed, with its first successful releases occurring in 1991. The label would go on to have major success throughout the 1990s with artists such as Toni Braxton, TLC, Outkast, Pink and Usher.

The album was described by author Ted Cox in his book on Houston as the album "captur[ing] Whitney in a transitional stage in her career." The project also personally influenced Houston to assert more control of her work. From then on, Houston would serve as executive producer on all of her subsequent albums after I'm Your Baby Tonight, including her soundtracks to The Bodyguard (1992) and The Preacher's Wife (1996), as well as the multi-artist soundtrack to Waiting to Exhale (1995) and other studio albums such as My Love Is Your Love (1998) and I Look to You (2009).

According to Matthew Hocter for the site Albumism in 2020, around the time of the album's 30th anniversary, he stated that the album "shifted her focus from big ballads and the occasional bop to a firm dance pop album, albeit with a few ballads included for good measure," while further declaring that the album had Houston "transition[ing] from brilliant singer to the legend we have come to know." In 2017, The Boombox ranked the album the eighth greatest new jack swing album of all time.

== Track listing ==
I'm Your Baby Tonight – Standard edition
No.	Title	Writer(s)	Length
1.	"I'm Your Baby Tonight"	L.A. Reid; Babyface	4:59
2.	"My Name Is Not Susan"	Eric Foster White	4:39
3.	"All the Man That I Need"	Dean Pitchford; Michael Gore	4:11
4.	"Lover for Life"	Sam Dees	4:49
5.	"Anymore"	Reid; Babyface	4:23
6.	"Miracle"	Reid; Babyface	5:42
7.	"I Belong to You"	Derek Bramble; Franne Golde	5:30
8.	"Who Do You Love"	Luther Vandross; Hubert Eaves III	3:57
9.	"We Didn't Know" (duet with Stevie Wonder)	Wonder	5:30
10.	"After We Make Love"	Michael Masser; Gerry Goffin	5:07
11.	"I'm Knockin'"	Rhett Lawrence; Rickey Minor; Benjamin Winans	4:58

Japanese edition – bonus tracks
No.	Title	Writer(s)	Producer(s)	Length
12.	"Takin' a Chance"	Whitney Houston; Winans; Keith Thomas	Thomas	4:11
13.	"Higher Love"	Steve Winwood; Will Jennings	Narada Michael Walden	5:09

Notes

- In countries outside the US, Canada, and Latin America, the "Yvonne Turner Mix" of "I'm Your Baby Tonight" replaced the L.A. Reid/Babyface original version as track 1.

== Personnel ==
- Whitney Houston – vocals, background vocals, vocal arrangements
- Walter Afanasieff – keyboards, Moog bass, synthesizers
- Tawatha Agee – background vocals
- Gerald Albright – saxophone
- Skip Anderson – drums, keyboards
- Babyface – keyboards, Memorymoog bass, vocals, background vocals
- Kitty Beethoven – background vocals
- Louis Biancaniello – synthesizer, keyboards
- Gary Bias – alto saxophone
- Vernon "Ice" Black – guitar
- Kimberly Brewer – background vocals
- Ray Brown – trumpet
- Chris Camozzi – guitar
- Francisco Centeno – bass
- Paulinho Da Costa – percussion
- Hubert Eaves III – synthesizer, drums, keyboards
- Steve Ferrone – drums
- Lynn Fiddmont – background vocals
- Kenny G – saxophone
- Jerry Hey – strings
- Dorian Holley – background vocals
- Cissy Houston – background vocals
- Paul Jackson Jr. – guitar
- Skyler Jett – background vocals
- Keith John – background vocals
- Melisa Kary – background vocals
- Kayo – Fender bass, Moog bass
- Randy Kerber – strings, keyboards
- Ren Klyce – Fairlight synthesizer
- Robbie Kondor – strings, keyboards, rhythm
- Neil Larsen – Hammond organ
- Ricky Lawson – synthesizer, percussion, drums
- Wayne Linsey – piano
- Frank Martin – piano, keyboards, vibraphone
- Paulette McWilliams – background vocals
- Jason Miles – synthesizer
- Ricky Minor – synthesizer, bass, horn, background vocals, rhythm, synthesized bass
- Billy Myers – horn
- Rafael Padilla – percussion
- Donald Parks – Fairlight synthesizer
- L.A. Reid – percussion, drums
- Claytoven Richardson – background vocals
- Tom Scott – saxophone
- Michael "Patches" Stewart – trumpet
- Annie Stocking – background vocals
- Steve Tavaglione – horn, tenor saxophone
- Jeanie Tracy – background vocals
- Luther Vandross – vocals
- Narada Michael Walden – synthesized bass, percussion
- David Ward II – synthesizer
- Bill Washer – guitar
- Kirk Whalum – saxophone, tenor saxophone
- Brenda White-King – background vocals
- BeBe Winans – background vocals
- CeCe Winans – background vocals
- Stevie Wonder – vocals, multiple instruments, performer
- Reggie C. Young – trombone

=== Production ===
- L.A. Reid - producer, arranger
- Babyface - producer, arranger
- Jon Gass - recording
- Barney Perkins - recording
- Donnell Sullivan - engineer
- Ryan Dorn - engineer
- Jim Zumpano - engineer
- Cynthia Ahiloh - production coordination
- Marsha Burns - production coordination
- Susanne Edgren - production coordination
- Janice Lee - production coordination
- Cynthia Shiloh - production coordination
- Kevin Walden - production coordination
- Gar Wood - production coordination
- Stephanie Andrews - project coordinator
- Robert A. Arbittier - sound design
- Louis Biancaniello - drum programming, additional programming
- Walter Afanasieff - drum programming
- Ren Klyce - programming
- Ricky Lawson - programming
- Jason Miles - programming
- David Ward II - programming
- Hubert Eaves III - drum programming
- Skip Anderson - keyboard programming
- Donald Parks - keyboard programming
- John Anderson - arranger
- Hubert Eaves III - keyboard programming, arranger
- Whitney Houston - arranger, vocal arrangement, producer
- Randy Kerber - arranger
- Robbie Kondor - arranger
- Ricky Minor - arranger, horn arrangements
- Billy Myers - arranger, horn arrangements
- Steve Tavaglione - arranger, horn arrangements
- Luther Vandross - arranger
- Narada Michael Walden - arranger
- BeBe Winans - arranger
- CeCe Winans - arranger
- Stevie Wonder - arranger
- Jerry Hey - string arrangements
- Susan Mendola - art direction
- Andrea Blanch - photography
- Tim White - photography
- Bernard Maisner - lettering
- Kevyn Aucoin - make-u
- Patrick Poussard - make-up
- Barbara Dente - stylist
- Ellen La Var - hair stylist
- George Marino - mastering

== Charts ==
=== Weekly charts ===
1990–1991 weekly chart performance for I'm Your Baby Tonight
Chart (1990–1991)	Peak position
Australian Albums (ARIA)	10
Austrian Albums (Ö3 Austria)	2
Belgian Albums (IFPI)	5
Canada Top Albums/CDs (RPM)	12
Danish Albums (IFPI Danmark)	1
Dutch Albums (Album Top 100)	4
European Top 100 Albums (Music & Media)	2
Finnish Albums (Musiikkituottajat)	2
French Albums (SNEP)	9
German Albums (Offizielle Top 100)	3
Greek Albums (IFPI Greece)	1
Hungarian Albums (MAHASZ)	7
Icelandic Albums (IFPI)	3
Italian Albums (Musica e dischi)	5
Japanese Albums (Music Labo)	4
New Zealand Albums (RMNZ)	19
Norwegian Albums (VG-lista)	5
Portuguese Albums (AFP)	9
Spanish Albums (Promusicae)	8
Swedish Albums (Sverigetopplistan)	3
Swiss Albums (Schweizer Hitparade)	2
UK Albums (Official Charts)	4
US Billboard 200	3
US Top R&B/Hip-Hop Albums (Billboard)	1

2012 weekly chart performance for I'm Your Baby Tonight
Chart (2012)	Peak position
US Billboard 200	32

2023 weekly chart performance for I'm Your Baby Tonight
Chart (2023)	Peak position
Spanish Vinyl Albums (Promusicae)	37

=== Year-end charts ===
1990 year-end chart performance for I'm Your Baby Tonight
Chart (1990)	Position
Australian Albums (ARIA)	41
Canada Top Albums/CDs (RPM)	67
Dutch Albums (Album Top 100)	23
UK Albums (OCC)	28

1991 year-end chart performance for I'm Your Baby Tonight
Chart (1991)	Position
Austrian Albums (Ö3 Austria)	17
Canada Top Albums/CDs (RPM)	61
Dutch Albums (Album Top 100)	35
European Top 100 Albums (Music & Media)	13
German Albums (Offizielle Top 100)	42
Japanese Albums (Oricon)	78
Swiss Albums (Schweizer Hitparade)	22
UK Albums (Music Week)	56
US Top Pop Albums (Billboard)	10
US Top R&B Albums (Billboard)	1

== Certifications and sales ==
Region	Certification	Certified units/sales
Australia (ARIA)	Platinum	70,000^{^}
Austria (IFPI Austria)	Platinum	50,000^{*}
Brazil	—	250,000
Canada (Music Canada)	Platinum	100,000^{^}
Finland (Musiikkituottajat)	Gold	35,702
France (SNEP)	Platinum	300,000^{*}
Germany (BVMI)	Platinum	500,000^{^}
Ghana	—	7,000
Japan (RIAJ)	2× Platinum	400,000^{^}
Netherlands (NVPI)	Platinum	100,000^{^}
Spain (Promusicae)	2× Platinum	200,000^{^}
Sweden (GLF)	Platinum	100,000^{^}
Switzerland (IFPI Switzerland)	2× Platinum	100,000^{^}
United Kingdom (BPI)	Platinum	300,000^{^}
United States (RIAA)	4× Platinum	4,150,000
Summaries
Worldwide	—	10,000,000
^{*} Sales figures based on certification alone.^{^} Shipments figures based on certification alone.

== Bibliography ==
- Cox, Ted (1999). Whitney Houston: Black Americans of Achievement. Chelsea House Publishers. ISBN 0-7910-4456-4.
- Heppermann, Christine (2012). Whitney Houston: Recording Artist & Actress. ABDO Publishing. ISBN 9781614801733.
- Parish, Robert (2003). Whitney Houston: The Unauthorized Biography. Aurum Press. ISBN 1-85410-921-9.
- Seal, Richard (1994). One Moment in Time: Whitney Houston. Britannia Press Publishing. ISBN 0-9519937-8-X.
- Walden, Narada Michael (2012). Whitney Houston: The Voice, The Music, The Inspiration. Insight Editions. ISBN 978-1-608-87200-8.
