= We Didn't Know =

Single by Whitney Houston and Stevie Wonder

from the album I'm Your Baby Tonight
- B-side: "Lover for Life"
- Released: April 14, 1992
- Recorded: November 1989
- Studio: Wonderland Studios (Los Angeles, CA)
- Genre: R&B; soul; funk; new jack swing
- Length: 5:32 (album version); 4:26 (album edit)
- Label: Arista
- Songwriter: Stevie Wonder
- Producers: Stevie Wonder; Vincent Herbert, Kiyamma Griffin (remix)

Whitney Houston singles chronology
| "I Belong to You" (1991) | "We Didn't Know" (1992) | "I Will Always Love You" (1992) |

Stevie Wonder singles chronology
| "These Three Words" (1991) | "We Didn't Know" (1992) | "For Your Love" (1995) |

Audio video
- "We Didn't Know" on YouTube

"We Didn't Know" is a mid-tempo duet by American recording artists Whitney Houston and Stevie Wonder, and was released as the sixth and final single from Houston's third album I'm Your Baby Tonight (1990). The single was released on April 14, 1992 by Arista Records. Wonder wrote and produced the song. The single peaked at number 20 on Billboard's R&B Singles chart. There was no music video made for the song. This is the first and only single from the album that was issued without a music video.

The song is about two good friends that realize they have romantic feelings for each other and are more than just friends — they love each other, and they "didn't know." Houston and Wonder performed the song on an episode of The Arsenio Hall Show in December 1990.

Arista Records stopped working the album's singles to top 40 after "My Name Is Not Susan" became her first solo single to not reach the top ten. The duet was thus never sent to pop radio. "We Didn't Know" and the prior release, "I Belong to You", were both R&B-only releases. The song managed a decent placing despite no video and being a nearly two-year-old track by the time of its release.

== Critical reception ==
Matthew Hocter from Albumism described "We Didn't Know" as a "gentle ballad". J.D. Considine from The Baltimore Sun wrote that it, "in which Houston merely follows the lead of duet partner Stevie Wonder, also has its pleasures, most of which stem from Wonder's deliciously idiosyncratic writing." David Browne from Entertainment Weekly called the song "sluggish". He added that this contribution "blends into the mush". People Magazine stated that "if Houston thought she could shut critics up by recording a tartly appealing Stevie Wonder song about friendship turning into love, 'We Didn't Know'—and recording it as a touching duet with Wonder himself—she was right". James Hunter from Rolling Stone adored the song and praised it with a long review, "Still, the key to the kind of music Houston sings on I'm Your Baby Tonight—the black-and-white, funk-and-dance-driven pop that is the soundtrack of this cultural moment—is 'We Didn't Know'." He noted further, "Wonder, who practically invented the keyboard-based pop that Houston and her fans hear as natural and contemporary, understands Houston totally. He knows what she likes about the expressive properties of ballads, about the passion of rock, about the well-regulated technological zing of dance music. So, as he's done before in his own music and with other singers, he puts all of this—the barreling rhythm tracks, the soaring choruses, the personable background voices—at the service of 'We Didn't Know', which is about when 'innocent friends/Turn serious lovers.' Chances are—and with any luck—this emotionally engaged song on Whitney Houston's consistent and resourceful album will affect the music she sings for the rest of her life."

== Chart performance ==
For the week of July 4, 1992, the song reached a peak of 20 on the Billboard Hot R&B Singles chart. Since it was only released to R&B radio and retail, it didn't reach the Billboard Hot 100. It was Houston's 18th top 20 R&B hit and her third hit duet on the chart. It was Wonder's 53rd top 20 single and his fourth straight top 20 hit of the 1990s following the three top ten hits Wonder released from the soundtrack of the film, Jungle Fever.

== Accolades ==
In their list of the 40 Best Whitney Houston Songs, BET ranked it 38th place.

== Track listings and formats ==
All tracks are written by Stevie Wonder, except "Lover for Life", which was written by Sam Dees and produced and arranged by Narada Michael Walden

- US CD single
1. "We Didn't Know" (remix edit) – 4:45 ^{A}
2. "We Didn't Know" (album edit) – 4:26
3. "We Didn't Know" (extended remix) – 6:14 ^{A}
- US 12" vinyl single

A1 "We Didn't Know" (remix edit) – 4:43
B1 "We Didn't Know" (extended remix) – 6:09

^{A} Remix produced by Vincent Herbert and Kiyamma Griffin

- US Cassette maxi single

A1 "We Didn't Know" (album edit) – 4:26
A2 "We Didn't Know" (remix edit) – 4:40
A3 "Lover for Life" – 4:45
B1 "We Didn't Know" (album edit) – 4:26
B2 "We Didn't Know" (remix edit) – 4:40
B3 "Lover for Life" – 4:45

== Charts ==
| Chart (1992) | Peak position |
|---|---|
| US Hot R&B/Hip-Hop Songs (Billboard) | 20 |

== Personnel ==
Credits

- Producer, writer, vocal arrangement, all instruments – Stevie Wonder
- Background vocals – Kimberly Brewer, Lynne Fiddmont-Linsey, Dorian Holley, Keith John
- Engineer, mixer – Bobby Brooks
- Assistant engineer – Steve VanArden, Danny Mormando
- Sound design – Robert Arbittier
- Stevland Morris Music Project Coordinator – Stephanie Andrews

Recording and mixing

- Recorded and mixed at Wonderland Studios, Los Angeles
- Lead vocals recorded at Sigma Sound Studios, New York City
