= My Name Is Not Susan =

1991 single by Whitney Houston

Single by Whitney Houston

from the album I'm Your Baby Tonight
- Released: June 17, 1991
- Studio: Elumba (Hollywood, California)
- Genre: New jack swing; pop; dance; R&B
- Length: 4:39
- Label: Arista
- Songwriter: Eric Foster White
- Producers: L.A. Reid; Babyface

Whitney Houston singles chronology
| "Miracle" (1991) | "My Name Is Not Susan" (1991) | "I Belong to You" (1991) |

Music video
- "My Name Is Not Susan" on YouTube

Music video
- "My Name Is Not Susan (w/out Rap)" on YouTube

"My Name Is Not Susan" is a song by American singer Whitney Houston, released as the fourth single from her third album, I'm Your Baby Tonight (1990). The song was released on June 17, 1991, by Arista Records. It was produced by L.A. Reid and Babyface and written by Eric Foster White.

The song is an uptempo new jack swing number in which Houston harshly tells off a lover who has mistakenly called her by his ex-girlfriend's name "Susan". She lets him know that if he cannot get over Susan, then their relationship is over. The music video for the song was directed by Lionel C. Martin and was inspired by the 1958 film Vertigo.

At the time, the song's modest chart reception made it the first commercial Houston single to not reach the top ten of the Billboard Hot 100, ending the singer's consecutive top ten streak, (Note: Houston was a featured duet partner in songs performed by Teddy Pendergrass and Aretha Franklin that charted below the top 40 in 1984 and 1989 respectively and in 1991, her rendition of "The Star-Spangled Banner" was released as a standalone charity single.) but still reached number 20 on the chart becoming her 15th top 20 hit while continuing Houston's nearly uninterrupted streak of top ten singles on the R&B chart, where it reached number eight. In the UK, it peaked at number 29 on the UK Singles Chart. It was also a top 20 hit in Ireland, Luxembourg and Finland.

A remix featuring British rapper Monie Love was also released, becoming one of the first times a pop/R&B artist had included a rapper in a remix, following Janet Jackson's "Alright", which remix featured Heavy D the year prior.

== Background and recording ==
Whitney Houston worked with producers Antonio "L.A." Reid and Kenneth "Babyface" Edmonds at Elumbia, a Hollywood recording studio in the spring of 1990 for Houston's third album I'm Your Baby Tonight following some backlash from black music critics for neglecting her soul music roots, accusations Houston strongly denied to the press at the time.

"My Name Is Not Susan" was one of four songs worked on by Babyface and Reid for Houston and written by Eric Foster White with its assertive and aggressive lyrics and vocal arrangement by Houston herself differing sharply from her past work.

== Critical reception ==
"My Name Is Not Susan"
Audio sample of "My Name Is Not Susan", in which Houston reprimands her lover for calling her by his ex-girlfriend's name

In a retrospective review, Matthew Hocter from Albumism noted the "fresh vibe", describing the song as "thumping". Upon the release, J.D. Considine of The Baltimore Sun felt it was "emotionless", adding, Houston "has no trouble navigating a state-of-the-art funk groove (as with the new jack "My Name Is Not Susan"), she's mainly going through the motions; there's absolutely nothing in her performance to suggest that she was even the slightest bit moved by these songs." Larry Flick from Billboard magazine commented, "After several ballads, Houston jacks it up on a percolating jam that features one of her more assertive vocals." Henderson and DeVaney from Cashbox stated, "This high-tech, funky, L.A. & Babyface-produced cut isn't nearly as pop as some of Houston's material."

Entertainment Weekly editor David Browne panned it, writing that "in what could be seen as an audition for her pending movie career, Houston gets to act angry on "My Name Is Not Susan", in which she scolds a bedmate for calling out the name of an ex-flame in his sleep." Pan-European magazine Music & Media described it as a "pacey pop/dance track boasting a snappy chorus." Rolling Stone's James Hunter noted that Houston "stipulates in no uncertain terms" in this song vocally. Caroline Sullivan from Smash Hits commented, "And not only are her lyrics more adult, the music is the toughest she's come up with yet. Of course, being Whitney, that means it's still fairly sugar-sweet, but this is a most enjoyable record."

== Chart performance ==
=== North America ===
"My Name Is Not Susan" performed moderately well on the charts in the countries it charted. In the US, it debuted at number 67 on the Billboard Hot 100 for the week of July 27, 1991 and peaked at number 20 on September 7 in its eighth week. It would become Houston's 15th top 20 hit on the chart and was notable for ending Houston's streak of consecutive top ten commercial singles at thirteen. It dropped out of the charts after ten cumulative weeks in total, at the time, Houston's shortest showing on the Billboard Hot 100. It spent six of its ten weeks inside the top 40.

The song also briefly charted on the Adult Contemporary Singles chart, peaking at number 44, Houston's second lowest peak on that chart (her rendition of "The Star-Spangled Banner", which also charted that year, was the lowest at number 48).

It fared better on the Hot R&B Singles chart. After debuting at number 68 on the chart for the week of July 27, it reached its peak of number eight on September 21. Its tenure on the R&B chart lasted 14 cumulative weeks.

On the Cash Box charts, its peaks there were number 27 and 9 on their pop and R&B charts respectively. In Canada, it missed the top 40, peaking at number 43, becoming Houston's lowest chart single there at the time.

It was among one of writer Eric Foster White's first chart hits. Around the same time, he had also made the charts with R&B group Hi-Five's pop-soul ballad, "I Can't Wait Another Minute", to which he also produced.

=== Europe ===
Globally, the song received an even more modest reception. In Australia, it peaked at number 118.

The song fared better in European countries: besides a peak of 43 in Belgium, it reached number 14 each in Finland and Ireland, while in Luxembourg, it peaked at number 18.

The song barely missed the top 20 on the Netherlands' Dutch Top 40 at number 22 while its peak on the country's Single Top 100 was number 28.

In the UK, it also performed modestly well, peaking at number 29 on its official singles chart, while peaking at number 25 on its dance chart and number three on the UK Airplay chart.

It was a modest success in Germany, charting twice. In its initial 1991 release, it reached number 57. Seven years later, in 1998, during Houston's European tour, a remixed version of the song (remixed by Snap! in 1991 as the '70s Flange Mix), sent the song to a new peak at number 52. It reached the top 30 on the Eurochart Hot 100, peaking at number 26.

== Live performances ==
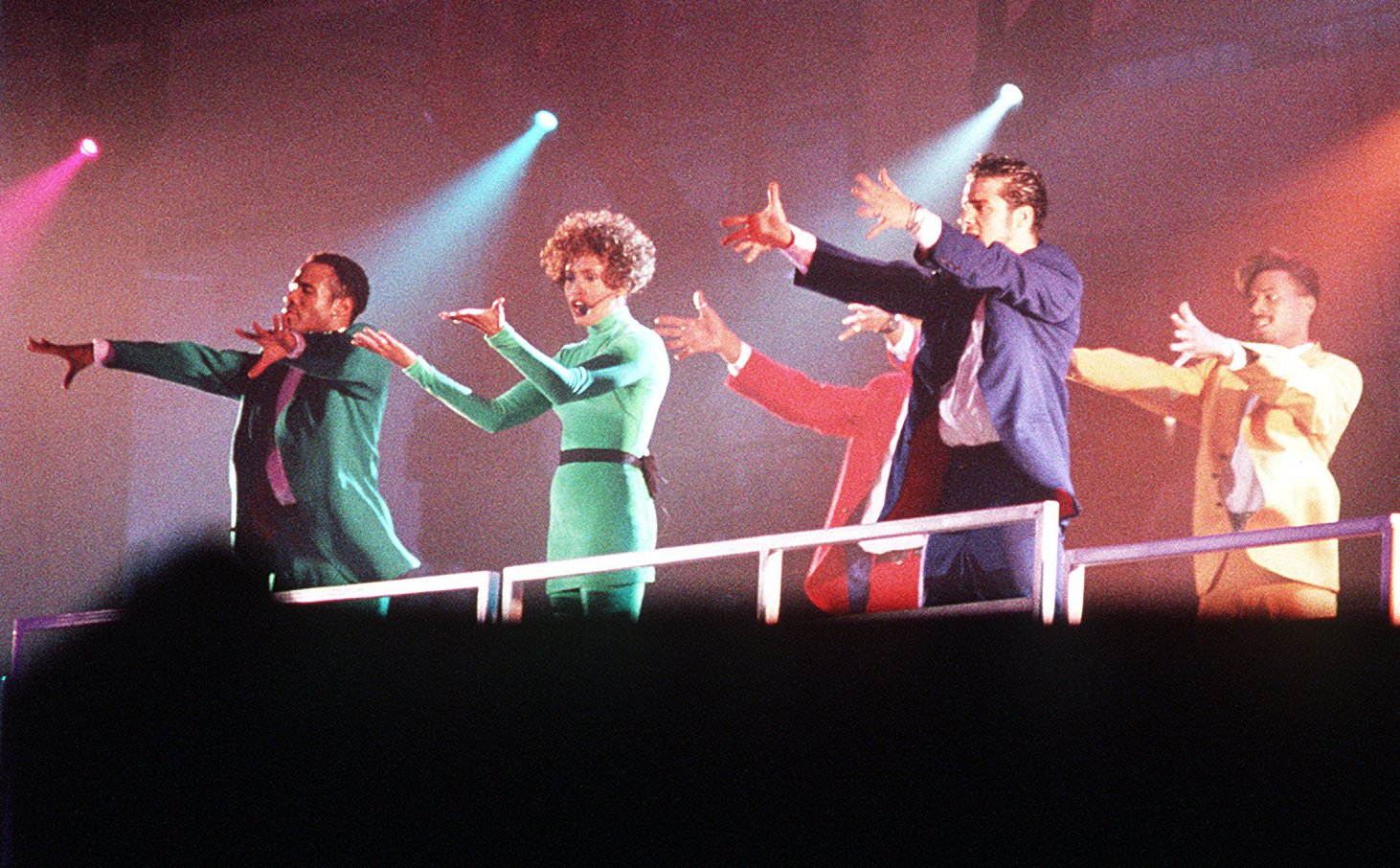
Houston performing the song in 1991.

Houston performed the song on her I'm Your Baby Tonight World Tour (1991). Three different performances of the song were taped; in Yokohama, Japan on March 15, 1991; Oakland, California on May 11, 1991; and A Coruña, Spain on September 29, 1991. The Yokohama concert was broadcast on a Japanese TV channel and the show in Oakland was aired during The Simple Truth: A Concert for Kurdish Refugees, a telethon held to aid the Kurds on May 12, 1991.

Houston also performed the song on Welcome Home Heroes with Whitney Houston, broadcast live on HBO, March 31, 1991. This performance can be found on the video, Welcome Home Heroes with Whitney Houston ― Live in Concert.

At the 19th American Music Awards of 1992, Houston performed the remixed version of the song as a part of the "I'm Your Baby Tonight Medley," along with "I'm Your Baby Tonight" and "Who Do You Love".

In addition, she performed the song on The Concert for a New South Africa, the first of three concerts was aired live on HBO in November 1994, and on Whitney: Brunei The Royal Wedding Celebration, a private gig to celebrate for the wedding of Princess Rashidah Sa'adatul Bolkiah, the eldest daughter of the Sultan of Brunei Hassanal Bolkiah on August 24, 1996. The song was also performed throughout Houston's nine-date Pacific Rim Tour in 1997.

== Music video ==
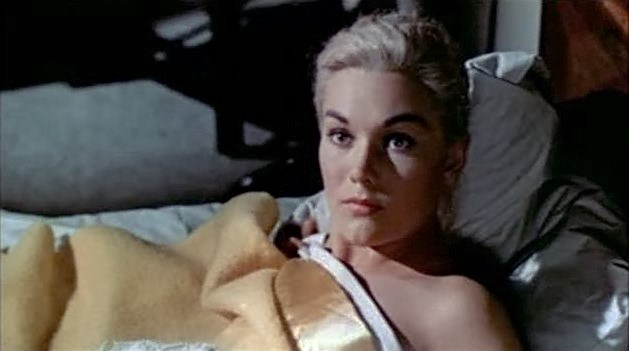
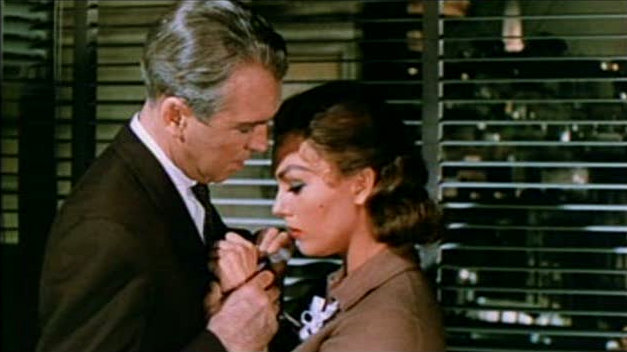
The Alfred Hitchcock film, Vertigo, starring Kim Novak (shown as two different characters in the film) inspired the music video for "My Name Is Not Susan".

The song's accompanying music video was directed by American music video director, film director and VJ Lionel C. Martin. Houston is featured playing both herself and a character named Susan, both of whom are obsessively pursued by a photographer named Martin Diamond, played by G. Rodney Owens.

The video is inspired by several elements in the 1958 Alfred Hitchcock film Vertigo, which follows Scottie Ferguson (James Stewart), a man involved with an obsessive love for both glamorous blonde Madeline Elster and down-to-earth brunette Judy Barton, both played by the same actress (Kim Novak).

Several specific scenes that are parallel Vertigo include a visit to a park, dining in a restaurant, Martin buying clothes for Houston, having her hair also dyed blonde and the way she emerges from the bathroom. The character of Martin the photographer may have been suggested by another Hitchcock film, Rear Window.

The video featured guest appearances by heavyweight boxing champion Mike Tyson, who was a friend of Houston's, and British rapper Monie Love. Later, the rap remix version of the video, which featured Love performing her rap, aired on BET. Outtakes from the video and alternate footage were reused for the video to the follow-up R&B chart single "I Belong to You". The two versions of the video were uploaded to Houston's YouTube channel, with the rap remix version uploaded first in October 2009 and the video in its original non-rap version in September 2013.

== Legacy, usage in popular culture and accolades ==
The remix of the single featuring British female rapper Monie Love marked one of the earliest examples of a contemporary pop and R&B artist adding a remix with a rapper before the practice became commonplace.

In their list of 15 essential Whitney Houston songs, The A.V. Club ranked the song tenth place, writing that Houston was "blending genres and breaking new ground in the project."

In their list of forty best Whitney Houston songs, BET ranked it 37th place.

Israeli performer Dana International launched her career with the single "Sa'Ida Sultana (The Great Sa'Ida)", a satirical version of "My Name is Not Susan", on her 1993 album Danna International (Offer Nissim Presents). That same year, rap group Salt-N-Pepa's hit "Whatta Man" referenced the song during member DJ Spinderella's verse.

== Track listings and formats ==
- UK, CD maxi-single
1. "My Name Is Not Susan" (Waddell 7-inch) – 4:08
2. "My Name Is Not Susan" (Breakthrough mix) – 7:45
3. "My Name Is Not Susan" (album edit) — 4:37
- Germany, CD maxi-single (The Remixes)
1. "My Name Is Not Susan" (Waddell Alternate mix) – 7:40
2. "My Name Is Not Susan" (L.A. Reid & Babyface remix) – 5:56
3. "My Name Is Not Susan" (Waddell Straight mix) – 6:17
- UK, Germany, CD maxi-single
1. "My Name Is Not Susan" (Waddell 7-inch) – 4:08
2. "My Name Is Not Susan" ('70's Flange mix) – 5:34
3. "My Name Is Not Susan" (Logic remix extended) – 5:39
4. "My Name Is Not Susan" (Ambiente mix) – 5:08
- US, CD single
1. "My Name Is Not Susan" (album edit) – 4:08
2. "My Name Is Not Susan" (Power Radio Mix w/Rap) (featuring Monie Love) – 4:39
3. "My Name Is Not Susan" (Power Radio Mix w/o Rap) — 4:04
4. "My Name Is Not Susan" (U.K. mix) – 4:10
- US, 12-inch vinyl single

A1: "My Name Is Not Susan" (extended mix) – 5:56
A2: "My Name Is Not Susan" (dub) – 4:28
B1: "My Name Is Not Susan" (extended U.K. mix) – 6:16
B2: "My Name Is Not Susan" (alternate U.K. mix) – 7:40

- Germany, 12-inch vinyl maxi-single

A1: "My Name Is Not Susan" (Waddell Straight mix) – 6:17
A2: "My Name Is Not Susan" (Waddell Alternate mix) – 7:40
B1: "My Name Is Not Susan" (L.A. Reid & Babyface remix) – 5:56
B2: "My Name Is Not Susan" (instrumental edit) – 5:19
B3: "My Name Is Not Susan" (dub) – 4:28

- UK, 12-inch vinyl

A: "My Name Is Not Susan" (The Breakthrough mix)
B1: "My Name Is Not Susan" (The Upbeat Cut mix)
B2: "My Name Is Not Susan" (Waddell 7-inch mix)

- Australia, 12-inch vinyl maxi-single

A1: "My Name Is Not Susan" (Logic remix extended)
A2: "My Name Is Not Susan" ('70's Flange mix)
B1: "My Name Is Not Susan" (album edit)
B2: "My Name Is Not Susan" (Ambiente mix)

Notes

"Logic Remix" is named the "Bellydance Mix" on some vinyl releases.
"Waddell Straight Mix", "Extended U.K. Mix" and "The Upbeat Cut Mix" are the same mix with alternate names.
"Waddell Alternate Mix", "Breakthrough Mix" and "Alternate U.K. Mix" are the same mix.

== Credits and personnel ==
- Vocal arrangement: L.A. Reid, Babyface and Whitney Houston
- Background vocals: Whitney Houston
- Rhythm arrangement: L.A. Reid and Babyface
- Additional production and remix: John Waddell
- Additional production and remix [Power Radio Mix]: LaFace Family, Keith Cohen
- Keyboard programming: Donald Parks
- Bass: Kayo
- Keyboards: Babyface
- Drums, percussion: L.A. Reid

Recording and mixing

- Recorded at Elumba Recording (Los Angeles, California)
- Mixed at Studio LaCoCo (Atlanta, Georgia)

== Charts ==
=== Weekly charts ===
| Chart (1991) | Peak position |
|---|---|
| Australia (ARIA) | 118 |
| Belgium (Ultratop 50 Flanders) | 43 |
| Canada Top Singles (RPM) | 43 |
| Canada Contemporary Hit Radio (The Record) | 35 |
| Eurochart Hot 100 (Music & Media) | 26 |
| European Hit Radio (Music & Media) | 10 |
| Finland (Suomen virallinen lista) | 14 |
| Germany (GfK) | 52 |
| Ireland (IRMA) | 14 |
| Luxembourg (Radio Luxembourg) | 18 |
| Netherlands (Dutch Top 40) | 22 |
| Netherlands (Single Top 100) | 28 |
| Sweden (Sverigetopplistan) | 31 |
| UK Singles (Official Charts) | 29 |
| UK Airplay (Music Week) | 3 |
| UK Dance (Music Week) | 25 |
| UK Club Chart (Record Mirror) | 62 |
| US Billboard Hot 100 | 20 |
| US Hot R&B/Hip-Hop Songs (Billboard) | 8 |
| US Adult Contemporary (Billboard) | 44 |
| US Cash Box Top 100 | 27 |
| US R&B Singles (Cash Box) | 9 |

=== Year-end charts ===
| Chart (1991) | Position |
|---|---|
| Canada Adult Contemporary (RPM) | 94 |
| Europe (European Hit Radio) | 84 |

== Release history ==
| Region | Date | Format(s) | Label(s) | Ref. |
|---|---|---|---|---|
| Australia | June 17, 1991 | 7-inch vinyl; 12-inch vinyl; cassette | Arista | |
| United Kingdom | June 24, 1991 | 7-inch vinyl; 12-inch vinyl; CD; cassette | Arista | |
| Japan | August 21, 1991 | Mini-CD | Arista | |
