= I Belong to You (Whitney Houston song) =

Single by Whitney Houston

from the album I'm Your Baby Tonight
- B-side: "One Moment in Time"
- Released: October 18, 1991 (U.S.)
- Recorded: October 1989
- Studio: Tarpan (San Rafael); Right Track (New York, NY)
- Genre: R&B; soul
- Length: 5:30
- Label: Arista
- Songwriters: Franne Golde; Derek Bramble
- Producer: Narada Michael Walden

Whitney Houston singles chronology
"My Name Is Not Susan" (1991)	"I Belong to You" (1991)	"We Didn't Know" (1992)

Licensed audio
- "I Belong To You" on YouTube

"I Belong to You" is a song recorded by American singer and actress Whitney Houston for her third studio album, I'm Your Baby Tonight (1990). It was written by Derek Bramble and Franne Golde, produced by Narada Michael Walden, and was released on October 18, 1991, as the album's fifth single by Arista Records.

The song's sensual groove and lyricism was inspired by the 1970s R&B work of American singer-songwriter Marvin Gaye and was a departure from Houston's previous material, with its recording happening in the aftermath of Houston's separation from American comedian and actor Eddie Murphy. It was one of the first songs to be recorded for the I'm Your Baby Tonight album in October 1989.

Though not officially released to pop radio — the first since "Thinking About You" (1985), "I Belong to You" was still an R&B hit, peaking at number ten on the US Billboard R&B chart and number three on the US Cash Box R&B chart in early 1992, becoming the fifth consecutive top ten R&B hit off the album. It also was a moderate hit in the UK and the Netherlands despite not being given an official global release. Houston performed it on selected dates during the UK leg of her world tour in 1991.

The song garnered Houston a nomination for the Grammy Award for Best Female R&B Vocal Performance at the 35th Grammy Awards (1993), losing to Chaka Khan's The Woman I Am. The song later made the track listing of Houston's 2012 compilation, I Will Always Love You: The Best of Whitney Houston. The network BET included the song in their list of Houston's 40 best songs in 2022.

== Background and recording ==
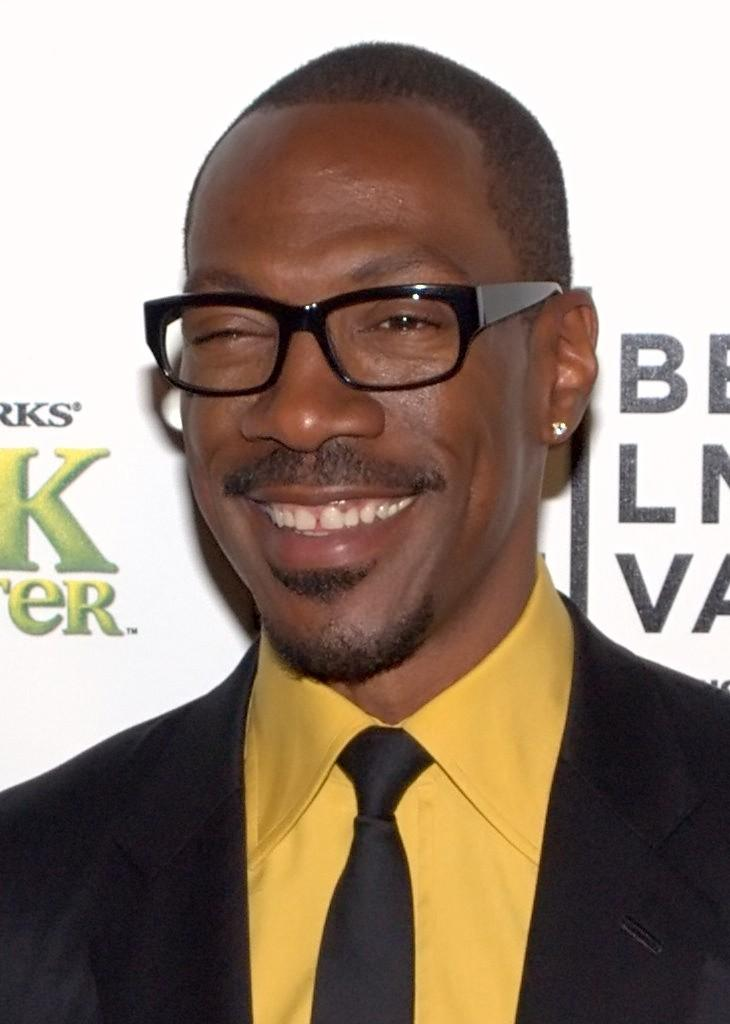
"I Belong to You" was recorded in the aftermath of Houston's breakup with Eddie Murphy (pictured in 2010).

During the early stages of the recording of the I'm Your Baby Tonight album in October 1989, producer Narada Michael Walden, fresh off being the main producer of Houston's previous album, Whitney, went into the recording of the album, composing five unnamed tracks with longtime collaborator Preston Glass for the album.

When Walden and Glass sent the tracks to Arista Records, the songs were promptly rejected, surprising Walden. He later claimed the reason for the rejection was due to the label's fears of Houston's more pop-oriented music not being accepted in black markets following the subpar R&B chart performance of "One Moment in Time", which Walden had produced in 1988, stating the label was looking for more urban R&B material. (Note: Despite "One Moment in Time" becoming a top-five hit on the Billboard Hot 100, the song only made it as high as number 22 on what was then known as the Hot Black Singles chart in October 1988, indicating that R&B radio stations rejected the song due to its pop sound.)

Not too long afterwards, Arista sent Walden six tracks to produce for Houston. The first two songs Walden worked on were the mid-tempo slow jams "Feels So Good" and "I Belong to You". After completing the music of the songs at his Tarpan recording studio in San Rafael, California, he then traveled to Manhattan where Walden and Houston recorded the songs at Right Track Recording. During the recording of "Feels So Good", Walden noted Houston, who was usually cheery and talkative, being unusually quiet and more workmanlike.

While finishing up work on "Feels So Good", Walden got a call from his personal guru who warned him, "please watch out for Whitney Houston", sensing the singer was "very troubled, very depressed, almost close to death", which alarmed Walden.

When Walden and Houston met up again, he asked her what was wrong and Houston admitted she was having relationship issues with comedian Eddie Murphy, with whom was a friend of Walden's and whom Houston had recently broken up with after Houston accused Murphy of leading her on throughout their affair.

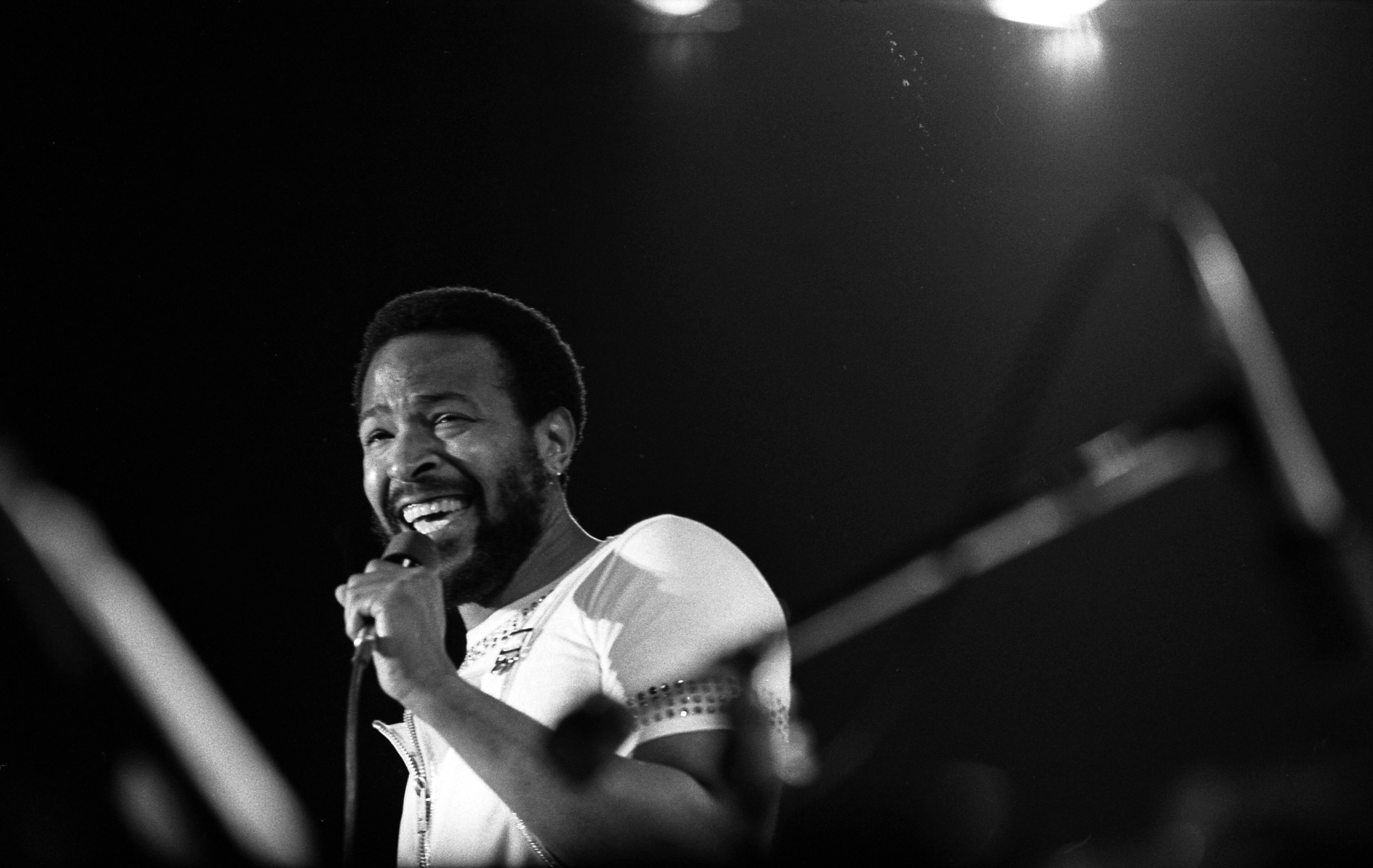
Marvin Gaye inspired the production of "I Belong to You".

After Walden jokingly asked Houston, "do you want me to go kick his ass?", Houston laughed and grinned, saying "you really do love me, don't you?" Walden concluded that the Murphy relationship and its aftermath had "worn her out". Walden wrote that "Feels So Good" and "I Belong to You" were "more R&B, more ghetto jukebox, with a long intro providing space for vocal ad-libs before the number really begins."

Walden was inspired by the sexy and sensual music of Marvin Gaye for the songs. "I Belong to You" called for "the kind of laid-back, understated vocal that some listeners may mistakenly assume would be relatively easy for a singer of Whitney Houston's talent." Walden wrote that Houston needed "eight or nine hours of sleep" to heal from any vocal wear and tear before she could do a song that required her to sing in softer tones. Before Houston recorded the song, she'd sing her cousin Dionne Warwick's songs "Alfie" and "Walk on By" for warm-up. For the song, Walden said Houston had to "play actress" because her real-life situation didn't reflect in the lyrics.

Walden credited Houston's "childlike spirit" to help her "believe in the message of the songs." Walden further wrote that Houston's performance in "I Belong to You" was touching because "I knew she had been emotionally crushed by a failed relationship and was mentally and physically exhausted. It was written all over her beautiful face." By the time Walden and Houston reconvened for the recording of "All the Man That I Need", Houston had "emerged from the fog" visible during the sessions of "Feels So Good" and "I Belong to You", which Walden correctly assumed was due to her emerging relationship with singer Bobby Brown.

== Critical reception ==
Larry Flick from Billboard magazine wrote that Houston "delivers a mature and restrained vocal within a lush, urban-angled swing/R&B arrangement." He noted its "contagious chorus". A reviewer from Music & Media said "the hip hop-shaped beat is more raw than the melody line, reminiscent of Beats International's 'Dub Be Good to Me'. Vintage Houston." Alan Jones from Music Week viewed it as "a pleasant but unexceptional soul shuffle". James Hunter of Rolling Stone commented that the song "acts out its claim in a penthouse bedroom" and described its production by Narada Michael Walden as "high-end grooves accented by pinballing counterrhythms."

== Chart performance ==
Following the top 20 peak of "My Name Is Not Susan", Arista executives decided to no longer present any more single from the album to pop radio, fearing a not-so acceptable reception as "My Name Is Not Susan", which while a moderate top twenty hit on the Billboard Hot 100, had broken Houston's consecutive streak of top-ten singles on the chart, having recorded thirteen consecutive top-ten hits in a seven-year span, which tied her with singers Lionel Richie and Phil Collins for the sixth most top-tens in a row, according to Billboard in its 40th anniversary issue. (Note: In their issue, Billboard excluded duets, Christmas songs, B-sides, reissues, non-album tracks and charity songs from being included unless said song reached the top ten. Houston had two moderately successful featured duets with singers Teddy Pendergrass and Aretha Franklin in 1984 and 1989 respectively peaking below the top forty while the standalone charity single of "The Star-Spangled Banner" initially reached number 20.) However, Arista agreed to sell the song primarily to R&B radio and retail, hoping to continue its top ten streak on that chart and to continue Houston's outreach to R&B and soul audiences. It became the first official Houston release since "Thinking About You" in October 1985 to only be released to R&B radio.

"I Belong to You" debuted at number 69 on the Hot R&B Singles chart on the November 16, 1991 issue of Billboard. It reached its peak of number 10 on that chart on the February 8, 1992 issue of Billboard 12 weeks later, giving Houston her 17th top ten single on the chart. It also made Houston the first recording artist to land five or more top ten R&B singles on three albums. It stayed on the R&B singles chart for 17 weeks in total. On the same issue, the song peaked at numbers 16 and 9 on the Hot R&B Singles Sales and Airplay charts respectively. On the rival Cash Box R&B chart, it did even better, peaking at number 3 on February 22 of the year.

Though the song wasn't given a commercial release in many other countries outside the United States, the song still made the charts in the UK and the Netherlands following the singer's European leg of her I'm Your Baby Tonight World Tour, where she performed the song in the former country. The song managed to reach number 79 in the latter country on its Single Top 100 chart, giving Houston her 16th hit single there and at the time was her lowest charted single in the country.

Following the release of a maxi-CD single in the UK, featuring a remix from producers Shep Pettibone and John Waddell, the song debuted and reached the peak position of number 54 on the UK singles chart on September 28, 1991, giving Houston her fifteenth top 75 hit in the country, staying on the chart for two weeks. It was a more successful radio hit in the UK, with a peak of number 15 on its Music Week airplay chart and reached number 38 on the European Hit Radio (EHR) chart.

== Live performances ==
Houston only performed the song during selected dates on the European leg of her I'm Your Baby Tonight World Tour (1991). According to the concert site Setlist.fm, Houston performed the song during her UK concerts, first performing it on August 31, 1991 at the NEC Arena in Birmingham and on September 11 and 15 at the Wembley Arena in London.

Unlike most of her singles, Houston never performed it on television and after the I'm Your Baby Tonight Tour wrapped up in Paris that October, she never performed it live in concert again. On the three dates it was performed at, it was often the "encore" song after Houston performed her signature ballad, "Greatest Love of All".

== Music video ==
The music video for "I Belong to You" featured outtakes from the previous music video to "My Name Is Not Susan". Former heavyweight champion Mike Tyson was featured in the video and was also featured in "My Name is Not Susan" as well. The video also includes footage from Houston's I'm Your Baby Tonight World Tour (1991).

== Accolades ==
At the 35th Annual Grammy Awards in 1993, the song earned Houston a nomination for the Grammy Award for Best Female R&B Vocal Performance, eventually losing out to Chaka Khan's The Woman I Am album. In their list of forty best Whitney Houston songs, BET ranked it 39th place, comparing it to R&B group Loose Ends' mid-1980s work.

== Track listings and formats ==
- UK 12" vinyl
1. "I Belong to You" (Shep Pettibone Remix Edit) — 4:32 ^{B}
2. "I Belong to You" (UK Remix Edit) — 4:48 ^{A}
3. "I Belong to You" (Album Version) — 5:28
4. "One Moment in Time" — 4:42
- UK CD maxi-single
1. "I Belong to You" (Album Version Edit) — 4:40
2. "I Belong to You" (UK Remix Edit) — 4:49 ^{A}
3. "I Belong to You" (Shep Pettibone Remix Edit) — 4:32 ^{B}
4. "One Moment in Time" — 4:42

^{A} Additional Production and Remix by John Waddell
^{B} Additional Production and Remix by Shep Pettibone

- US 7" vinyl
1. "I Belong to You" (Album Version Edit) — 4:41
2. "I Belong to You" (International Remix) — 4:52 ^{A}
- US, UK 12" vinyl
1. "I Belong to You" (UK Mix) — 8:55 ^{A}
2. "I Belong to You" (UK Dub) — 8:45 ^{A}
3. "I Belong to You" (69th Street Mix) — 9:27 ^{B}
4. "I Belong to You" (69th Street Dub) — 4:16 ^{B}

== Charts ==
Chart (1991–1992)	Peak position
Europe (European Hit Radio)	38
Netherlands (Single Top 100)	79
UK Singles (Official Charts)	54
UK Airplay (Music Week)	15
UK Dance (Music Week)	57
US Hot R&B/Hip-Hop Songs (Billboard)	10
US Top 100 R&B Singles (Cash Box)	3

== Personnel ==
Credits

- Lead vocals, backing vocals, vocal arrangement — Whitney Houston
- Producer, arranger — Narada Michael Walden
- Additional production and remix — John Waddell
- Post production and remix — Shep Pettibone
- Executive producer — Clive Davis

== Bibliography ==
- Walden, Narada Michael (2012). Whitney Houston: The Voice, The Music, The Inspiration. Insight Editions. ISBN 978-1-608-87200-8.
