= Welcome Home Heroes with Whitney Houston =

Video by Whitney Houston
- Released: May 14, 1991 (VHS and Laserdisc); 2002 (DVD)
- Recorded: March 31, 1991
- Genres: Pop, R&B
- Length: 96 minutes (US); 80 minutes
- Label: Arista
- Director: David Mallet
- Producers: Anthony Eaton, Whitney Houston (exec.), John R. Houston (exec.)

Welcome Home Heroes with Whitney Houston is the first ever solo televised concert and video by American singer Whitney Houston.

Released on May 14, 1991, through Arista Records, the video contains Whitney's HBO concert special Welcome Home Heroes with Whitney Houston, which was broadcast live from the Naval Air Station in Norfolk, Virginia, on March 31, 1991, Easter Sunday, for 3,500 servicemen and women returning from the Gulf War.

It was released in VHS and Laserdisc on May 14, 1991, and later on DVD in 2002. In 2008, the DVD was re-released in the United States and worldwide with the title A Song for You: Live.

== Background ==
Houston performed "The Star-Spangled Banner" during the Super Bowl XXV, on January 27, 1991. Her version of the song was so acclaimed that, on February 12, 1991, it was released as a charity single to raise funds for soldiers and families of those involved in the Persian Gulf War. Following her performance of "The Star-Spangled Banner" during the Super Bowl, Houston decided to carry it over into a concert to honor the troops, their families, and military and government dignitaries of the Gulf War.

The concert was originally scheduled as an HBO special, with Whitney singing for the troops on Easter Sunday. But by the time of the scheduled concert, the war was over and it was billed as a "Welcome Home, Heroes" concert, with Whitney performing in a Virginia naval hangar to welcome home military personnel returning from Iraq. About the event Whitney told The Salina Journal: "I was thinking about doing something else for the fellows over there and I was considering going overseas. Then the war ended and this came up."

== Development and broadcast ==
First, the United States Department of the Navy arranged for Whitney to fly out to meet the USS Saratoga, a cruise ship her men called "The Sara". The singer stayed overnight on the ship joking and laughing with the men, and even took a turn on the "mess line" serving dinner. After the visit to the Saratoga, Whitney went to Norfolk, Virginia to prepare for the concert.

The Governor of Virginia, L. Douglas Wilder, was invited and some top military officers who had served in the Gulf, but most of the seats were reserved for enlisted men and women of Desert Storm and their families. Because they were more troops than seats for the Easter Sunday's show, on March 31, 1991, 3,000 from the Army, Airforce, Navy, Marines and the Coast Guard were invited to the dress rehearsal on Saturday night.

The concert was broadcast live on HBO. The cable network agreed to unscramble its signal allowing it to be available to over 50 million cable households. It gave HBO their highest ratings ever at the time. About the concert, Whitney said:

Until I spent time with these military people, I didn't really appreciate how special they are. I was surrounded by courteous, brave men and women... I sang my heart out to them... and still felt them give more in return. I salute our troops, those who have returned and those still serving around the world, and thank them from the bottom of my heart.

== Track listing ==
Welcome Home Heroes with Whitney Houston – US VHS / Laserdisc edition
| No. | Title | Writer(s) | Length |
|---|---|---|---|
| 1. | "The Star-Spangled Banner" | Francis Scott Key; John Stafford Smith | 2:26 |
| 2. | "I Wanna Dance with Somebody (Who Loves Me)" | George Merrill; Shannon Rubicam | 5:53 |
| 3. | "Saving All My Love for You" | Gerry Goffin; Michael Masser | 8:55 |
| 4. | "How Will I Know" | George Merrill; Shannon Rubicam; Narada Michael Walden | 3:45 |
| 5. | "Didn't We Almost Have It All" (Love Song Medley) | Michael Masser; Will Jennings | 4:12 |
| 6. | "A House Is Not a Home" (Love Song Medley) | Burt Bacharach; Hal David | 0:23 |
| 7. | "Where Do Broken Hearts Go" (Love Song Medley) | Frank Wildhorn; Chuck Jackson | 2:06 |
| 8. | "All the Man That I Need" | Dean Pitchford; Michael Gore | 6:50 |
| 11. | "One Moment in Time" (Instrumental) | Albert Hammond; John Bettis | 2:38 |
| 12. | "My Name Is Not Susan" | Eric Foster White | 4:36 |
| 13. | "Anymore" | L.A. Reid; Babyface | 4:43 |
| 14. | "A Song for You" | Leon Russell | 6:49 |
| 15. | "Revelation" | | 8:15 |
| 16. | "Who Do You Love" | Luther Vandross; Hubert Eaves III | 5:29 |
| 17. | "I'm Your Baby Tonight" | L.A. Reid; Babyface | 4:51 |
| 18. | "Greatest Love of All" | Linda Creed; Michael Masser | 10:10 |
| 19. | "Battle Hymn of the Republic" | Julia Ward Howe; William Steffe | 6:57 |
| Total length: | | | 96:00 |

Notes

- All releases for the concert outside the US don't include the opening performance of "The Star Spangled Banner" and "The Battle Hymn of the Republic" as an encore.
- During "One Moment in Time" a video of Houston visiting the USS Saratoga and her troop is shown.

== Ratings ==
7.9 million viewers.

== Reception ==
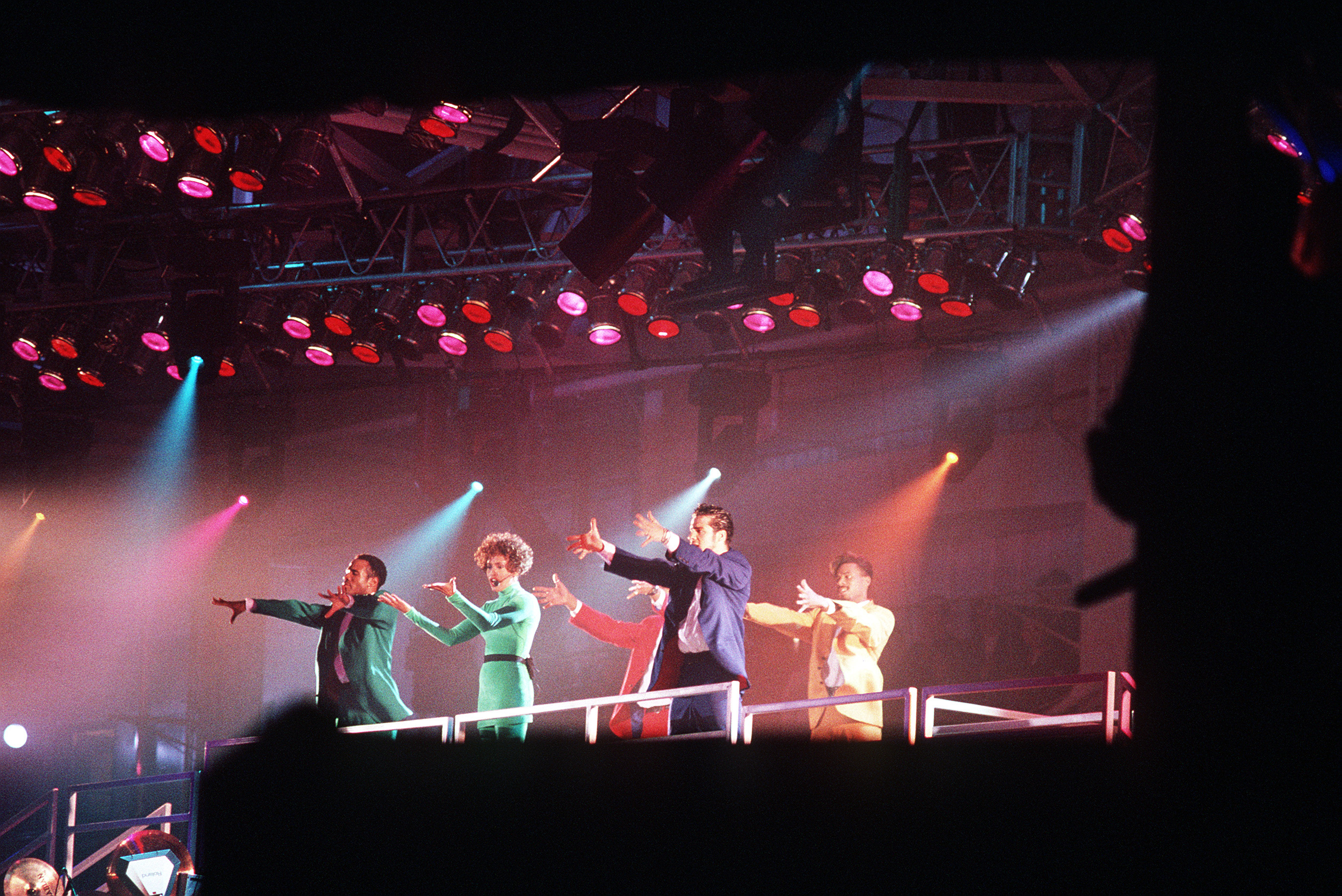
Houston performing "My Name Is Not Susan" during the concert

Jessica Goodman, from HuffPost, said that "the video shows the late singer at her best: infectiously energetic and wildly talented", while praising her performance of "I'm Your Baby Tonight", stating that the singer "brings a packed house of soldiers to their feet with an exhilarating rendition" of the song. Clive Davis, president of Arista Records at the time, told HuffPost: "There's a heated, sensuous, prowling-the-stage Whitney. It really just sends shivers up your spine. You see why every audience gets out of their seats roaring with a standing ovation. All this is real. It’s spectacularly revealing." Jessica Andrews, from Teen Vogue, praised her performance of "All the Man That I Need" saying that "Whitney's vocal acrobatics were truly second-to-none — especially in the final note, which she could hold for lengths at a time."

The show won a Cable ACE award for "Performance music special" in 1992.

== Home media ==
The concert was released in VHS and Laserdisc on May 14, 1991, and later on DVD in 2002. In 2008, the DVD was re-released in the United States and worldwide with the title A Song for You: Live.

Only the US VHS/LD have the full clips of the concert, originally broadcast live on HBO, including the opening performance of "The Star Spangled Banner" and "The Battle Hymn of the Republic" as an encore.

Since 1991, all releases for the concert outside the US, titled Live in Concert (official release) or several other names such as A Song for You: Live and Whitney Houston Live (which were issued by a few minor labels), don't include the above-mentioned performances with an 80-minute running time or less, shorter than the original 96-minute edition.
