= Miracle (Whitney Houston song) =

Single by Whitney Houston

from the album I'm Your Baby Tonight
- B-side: "After We Make Love"
- Released: April 16, 1991 (U.S.)
- Recorded: March 1990
- Studio: Elumba Recording (Hollywood, CA)
- Genre: R&B; soul
- Length: 5:42 (album version); 5:00 (radio edit); 4:35 (promo edit)
- Label: Arista
- Songwriters: L.A. Reid; Babyface
- Producers: L.A. Reid; Babyface

Whitney Houston singles chronology
"The Star Spangled Banner" (1991)	"Miracle" (1991)	"My Name Is Not Susan" (1991)

Music video
- "Miracle" on YouTube

"Miracle" is a song by American singer and actress Whitney Houston. Written and produced by L.A. Reid and Babyface, it was the third official release from Houston's third album, I'm Your Baby Tonight (1990) and commercially released on April 16, 1991 by Arista Records. Much like the previous releases on the album, the ballad became a hit, reaching the top ten of the US Billboard Hot 100 and also reached the top five of the R&B and Adult Contemporary charts, peaking at number one on the former's sales chart.

== Background, recording and composition ==
Whitney Houston first began working with contemporary R&B producers Antonio "L.A." Reid and Kenneth "Babyface" Edmonds at Hollywood's Elumba Recording Studios in March 1990. At the time, Houston aspired to work with the producers as a response to accusations that she had "sold out" by recording pop music.

Houston, Reid and Edmonds would collaborate on four tracks, including three uptempo new jack swing songs, including the song that was to be the title track of her third studio album, I'm Your Baby Tonight. Their fourth collaboration was a soul ballad called "Miracle".

It's been assumed and speculated that the emotional ballad was a song tackling abortion due to some of the lyrics in the song ("how could I throw away a miracle / how could I face another day / it's all of my doing, I made a choice / and today I pay / my heart is full of pain"). The songwriters and Houston herself denied such a connection in subsequent interviews.

During an interview with Jet magazine on its June 14, 1991 issue, Houston said that she did not intend the song or the video to be about abortion: “I think about the air we breathe, the earth we live on. I think about our children. I think about a lot of things, things God put here for us to have, things that we need and we take for granted. I think all of these things are miracles and I think we should try to take better care of them,” she notes. "Miracle" was one of the last songs recorded for the I'm Your Baby Tonight album.

== Critical reception ==
Matthew Hocter from Albumism noted that on "Miracle", Houston was "returning to ballad territory" after the majority of the tracks had focused on uptempo and midtempo material. AllMusic editor Ashley S. Battel called it a high point of the album and praised the lyrics, "the powerful verses surrounding a love lost through one's own devices in 'Miracle.'" Billboard described it as a "soothing and romantic ballad", complimenting the singer's "warm and restrained vocal performance" as well as the "lush R&B arrangement". Entertainment Weekly editor David Browne called the melody of the song "indiscernible" and that the song itself is "nonentity." Rolling Stone editor James Hunter praised Houston's performance of the ballad, "when L.A. and Babyface follow her into ballad-land on the despondent "Miracle," Houston's own moods call the shots more clearly."

== Chart performance ==
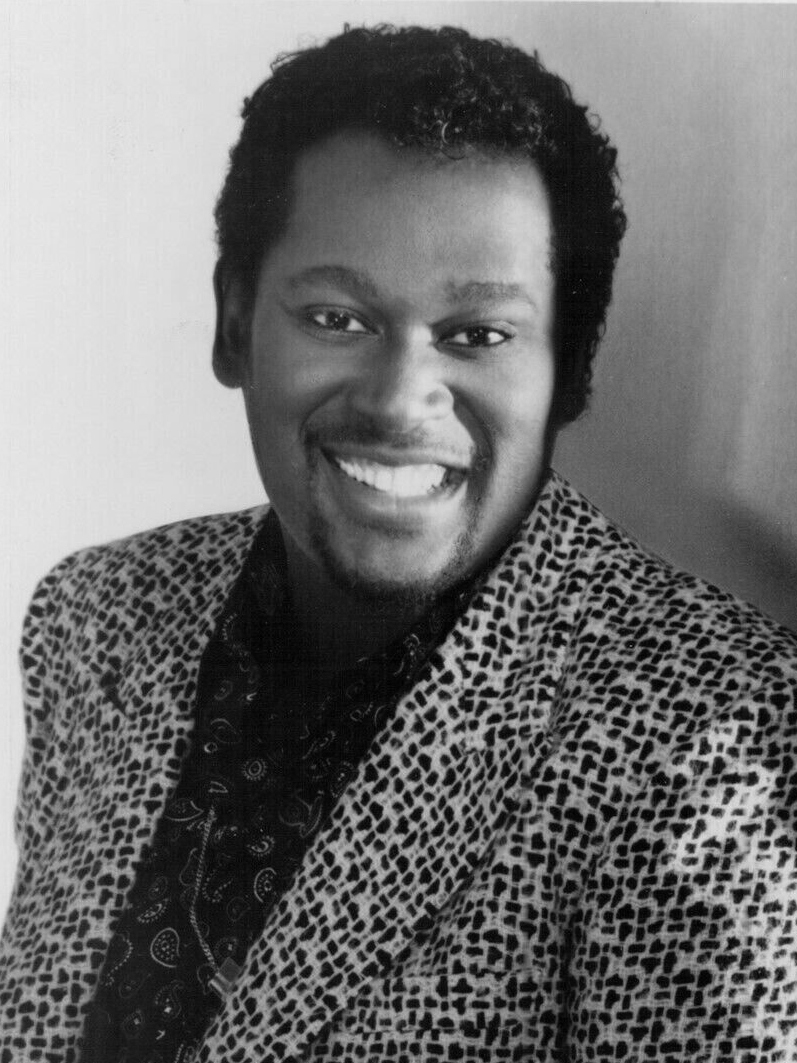
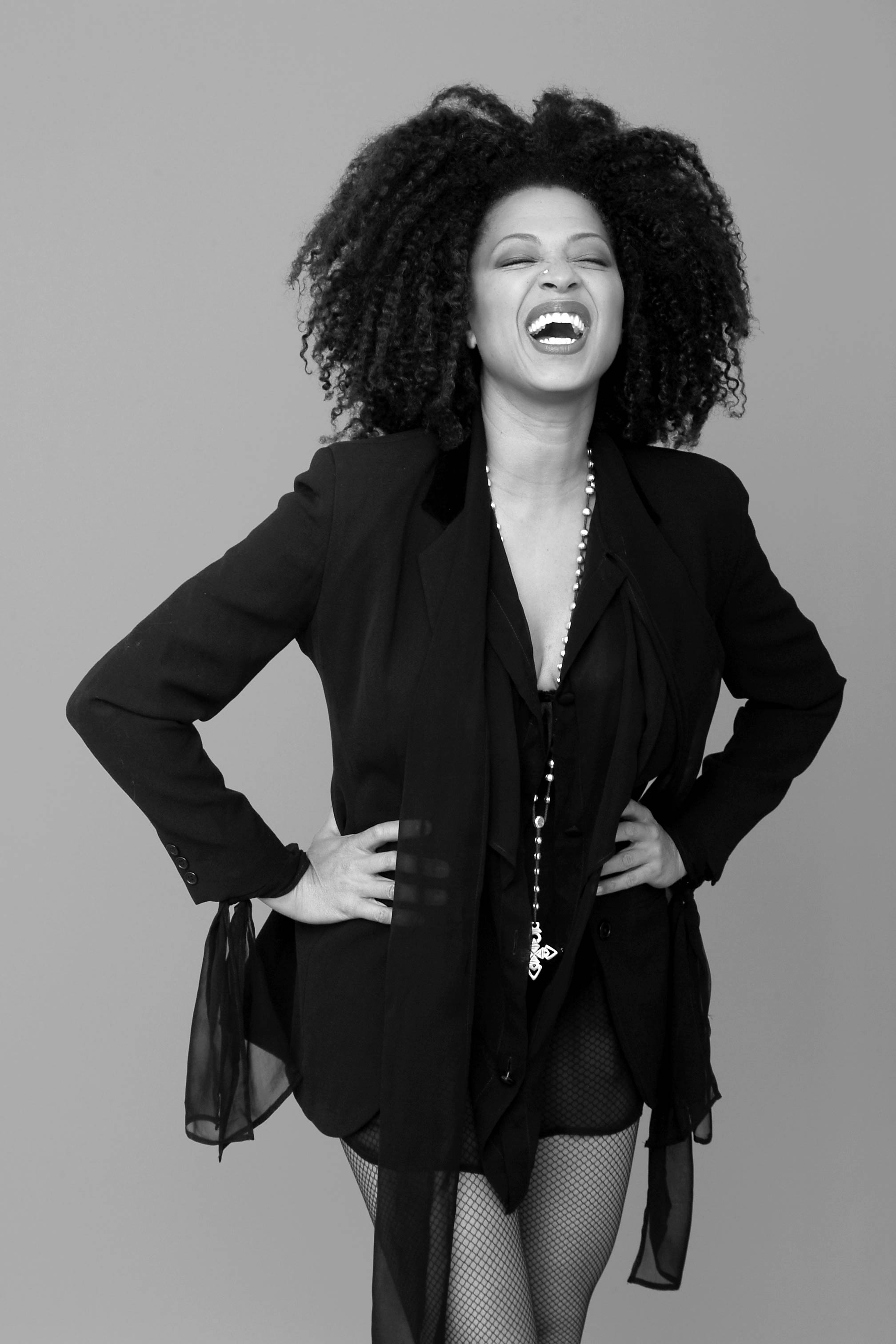
"Miracle" was blocked from number one on the Hot R&B Singles chart by "Power of Love/Love Power" from Luther Vandross and "How Can I Ease the Pain" from Lisa Fischer.

"Miracle" entered the Billboard Hot 100 at number 63 on April 13, 1991 as the "Hot Shot Debut" of the week. The song reached its peak position of number nine on June 8 of that year and eventually stayed on the chart for 14 weeks. It became Houston's career thirteenth top ten hit on the Billboard Hot 100.

The song was Houston's thirteenth consecutive top ten single as a leading artist, which placed her as the third female artist with the most consecutive top ten singles in chart history, only succeeded by fellow contemporary pop singers Madonna and Janet Jackson, a place Houston maintains to this day. (Note: Despite Houston scoring a top 50 duet with Aretha Franklin in 1989 and reaching the top 20 with her rendition of "The Star-Spangled Banner", Billboard excluded duets, Christmas songs and charity singles from the list.)

The same single debuted at number 61 on the Hot R&B Singles chart of the same week of April 13. On June 22, it reached the pole position of number two, staying there for another week, blocked from the number one spot by Luther Vandross' "Power of Love/Love Power" and Lisa Fischer's "How Can I Ease the Pain". The song spent 17 cumulative weeks on the chart, becoming Houston's career fifteenth top ten R&B single. The song reached number four on the Billboard Hot R&B Airplay chart and number one on the magazine's Hot R&B Sales chart both for the week of June 22, 1991, staying there at the top of the latter chart for two weeks.

On the Billboard adult contemporary charts, the song debuted at number 30 on April 13. Eight weeks later, it reached its peak position of number 4 for the week of June 8, staying on that chart for 23 weeks. It became Houston's career fourteenth top ten hit on the AC charts. In achieving this, Houston tied with her cousin Dionne Warwick in having the most consecutive top ten non-charity singles by a female artist. The song became Houston's eleventh career single to reach the top ten of the Billboard pop, R&B and AC charts simultaneously.

On the Cash Box Top 100 Pop Singles chart, the song debuted at number 80 for the week of April 13, eventually reaching its peak position of number 14 for the week of June 1, while on Cash Box's R&B chart, the same song debuted at number 69 and reached its peak position of number 5 on June 8.

On the Radio & Records Airplay chart, the single debuted at number 39 on the April 12, 1991 issue, after four weeks on the chart it reached and peaked at #12 staying there for two weeks, the song stayed on the top 20 of the chart for five weeks and remained on it for nine weeks. The song found modest success internationally, peaking at number 17 on the Canadian singles chart.

Following Houston's sudden passing in 2012, the song returned to the Billboard charts for the week of February 25 of the year, reaching number nine on the Gospel Digital Song Sales chart, making it one of the few songs to reach the top ten on four different genre charts.

== Music video ==
The video, directed by Jim Yukich, shows Houston by herself in an empty studio singing the song. As she sings the first verse of the song, sad images of people facing prison sentences and living in poverty. During the second verse, the images shown gradually changes to a lighter tone with pictures of children growing up, the handicapped winning a competition, graduating school and enjoying their lives as young adults. The video ends with various pictures of children smiling. It has since been viewed 58 million times on YouTube becoming her second most viewed music video from the I'm Your Baby Tonight album, after "All the Man That I Need".

== Accolades ==
The ballad was ranked 36th place in BET's list of the 40 best Whitney Houston songs in 2022. It was listed at 18th place of the 20 best Houston songs on About.com.

== Track listing and formats ==
- US, 7"Vinyl, Cassette single
  - A1 "Miracle" — 5:43
  - B1 "After We Make Love" — 4:59
- Japan, CD Mini single
1. "Miracle" — 5:04
2. "After We Make Love" — 4:59
- Promo CD-Single
1. "Miracle" (Radio edit) — 4:29

== Personnel ==
- Whitney Houston – vocals
- L.A. Reid, Babyface, Whitney Houston – vocal arrangement
- Donald Parks – keyboard programming
- Kayo – bass guitar
- L.A. Reid, Babyface – rhythm arrangement
- Babyface – keyboards
- L.A. Reid – drums, percussion

Production

- Producers – L.A. Reid, Babyface
- Executive Producer – Clive Davis
- Photography – Marc Bryan-Brown
- Design – Susan Mendola
- Recorded at Elumba Recording, Los Angeles, CA
- Mixed at Studio LaCoCo, Atlanta, GA

== Charts ==
=== Weekly charts ===
Chart (1991)	Peak position
Canada Top Singles (RPM)	17
Canada Retail Singles (The Record)	38
Canada Contemporary Hit Radio (The Record)	27
Quebec (ADISQ)	29
US Billboard Hot 100	9
US Adult Contemporary (Billboard)	4
US Hot R&B/Hip-Hop Songs (Billboard)	2
US Cash Box Top 100	14
US Top 100 R&B Singles (Cash Box)	5
US Radio & Records CHR/Pop Airplay Chart	12

=== Year-end charts ===
Chart (1991)	Position
Canada Adult Contemporary (RPM)	11
US Top Adult Contemporary Singles (Billboard)	33
US Top R&B Singles (Billboard)	24
US Top 50 R&B Singles (Cash Box)	26
