= The Simple Truth: A Concert for Kurdish Refugees =

1991 fundraising concert

The Simple Truth: A Concert for Kurdish Refugees was a 1991 fundraising concert in support of Kurdish Refugees after the Gulf War. The concert was produced by Tony Hollingsworth, with Jeffrey Archer also involved. It was staged in London, Amsterdam, Philadelphia and Sydney, and broadcast on television in 36 countries. During the concert, $15 million in donations were collected.

Nearly 12,000 people attended the concert at Wembley Arena in London, including the then Prime Minister John Major and Princess Diana.

The amount of money raised by the concert is uncertain. At a press conference on 19 June 1991 a figure of £57 million was stated, though this consisted mainly of aid offered by overseas governments. An investigation found that the concert and its associated appeal had raised £3 million, and Kurdish groups said that around £250,000 had been received by people in Iraq. Allegations concerning the misappropriation of funds were not substantiated.

== Featured artists ==
- Beverley Craven
- Chris de Burgh
- Gloria Estefan
- Peter Gabriel
- Gypsy Kings
- Hall & Oates
- MC Hammer
- Whitney Houston
- Lavine Hudson
- INXS
- Tom Jones
- Alison Moyet
- New Kids on the Block
- Sinead O’Connor
- Alexander O’Neal
- Shiven Perwer
- Ryuichi Sakamoto
- Paul Simon
- Snap!
- Lisa Stansfield
- Rod Stewart
- Sting
