= WH1TNEY =

Greatest hits album by Whitney Houston
- Released: August 7, 2026
- Recorded: 1984–2019
- Genres: Pop; soul; R&B
- Length: 140:20
- Labels: Arista; Legacy
- Producers: Whitney Houston; Narada Michael Walden; Michael Masser; Babyface; L.A. Reid; David Foster; Mervyn Warren; Jellybean

Whitney Houston chronology
| The Concert for a New South Africa (Durban) (2024) | WH1TNEY (2026) |

WH1TNEY is a posthumous compilation album by American singer Whitney Houston, released on August 7, 2026 through Arista Records and Legacy Records. The compilation was released two days prior to what would have been Houston's 63rd birthday and was accompanied by the unveiling of a Mattel-licensed Barbie doll of Houston from the music video of "I Wanna Dance with Somebody (Who Loves Me)".

The collection celebrates Houston's accomplishment of being one of the artists with the most number one hits in the history of the Billboard Hot 100 and comprises all of Houston's eleven number-one singles on the Billboard Hot 100 between "Saving All My Love for You" in 1985 and "Exhale (Shoop Shoop)" in 1995. Houston is noted for being the only artist to produce seven consecutive number one singles released between 1985 and 1988. Her 1992 hit "I Will Always Love You" spent 14 weeks at number one and was the longest running number one single in US history at the time of its release. Her last number one hit, "Exhale (Shoop Shoop)" was just the third to debut at number one in the US and was the first film song to do so.

The vinyl version of the album includes all eleven number ones while an expanded edition of the compilation, released digitally and on streaming platforms, included twenty-one additional tracks, including the soundtrack hit "I Believe in You and Me", the Olympics hit anthem "One Moment in Time" and her 2019 hit "Higher Love" while the remaining tracks are popular dance and club remixes of her hits spanning her entire career including "It's Not Right but It's Okay", "Queen of the Night", "Love Will Save the Day" and "Million Dollar Bill".

It is Houston's third compilation released since her death on February 11, 2012 after I Will Always Love You: The Best of Whitney Houston (2012) and I Go to the Rock: The Gospel Music of Whitney Houston (2023).

== Background ==
In April 1983, Whitney Houston signed to Arista Records at 19 years old. Arista head Clive Davis worked on Houston's debut album, Whitney Houston, for over a year prior to its Valentines Day 1985 release. Following the surprising crossover success of "You Give Good Love", the next single, "Saving All My Love for You", became her first number-one hit single on the Billboard Hot 100, in October 1985. This started what became a historic streak of seven consecutive number-one singles.

The debut album's next singles "How Will I Know" and "Greatest Love of All" followed "Saving All My Love for You" to number one on the chart, which made Houston the first female recording artist to send three songs to number one on the pop charts. Houston's highly anticipated second album, Whitney, was released in June 1987 and, thanks to the leading single, "I Wanna Dance with Somebody (Who Loves Me)", debuted at the top of the Billboard 200, making Houston the first female artist to accomplish that milestone.

"I Wanna Dance with Somebody (Who Loves Me)" topped the Billboard Hot 100 on the same day, becoming her fourth consecutive number-one hit. The next three releases off the album - "Didn't We Almost Have It All", "So Emotional" and "Where Do Broken Hearts Go", released between July 1987 and February 1988, all topped the same chart, helping Houston set numerous chart records. The most chief among the records she set was having the most consecutive number-one singles by a recording artist in music history with seven, beating a 22-year record held by the Beatles.

Houston continued to set more milestones as she entered the 1990s. In late 1990, her new jack swing hit "I'm Your Baby Tonight" from her album of the same name became her eighth number-one hit and was the first number-one pop hit for Babyface and L.A. Reid, while "All the Man That I Need" made her the first solo female artist to produce multiple number-one hits off three or more albums. In 1992, she had her biggest hit with "I Will Always Love You" from The Bodyguard. The song broke and set all kinds of chart records at the time of its release, including the longest running number-one single in history of the Hot 100 at 14 weeks. Three years later, in 1995, she scored her eleventh and final number-one hit with "Exhale (Shoop Shoop)", which became just the third single in history to debut at number one. At the time, Houston tied with Madonna for the most number-one singles by a woman on the Hot 100.

== Release and content ==
In July 2026, Houston's estate announced the release of the compilation. The vinyl album included Houston's eleven number-one singles in a translucent grape vinyl LP with its cover of the album coming from a 2000 David LaChapelle photoshoot as Houston was set on releasing her first compilation album, Whitney: The Greatest Hits. Houston's former record label Arista set the release date for August 7, just two days prior to what would've been Houston's 63rd birthday.

In an interview with the Associated Press, Houston's former manager, sister-in-law and estate executor Pat Houston said of the number ones compilation: "Whitney always believed that the ultimate collection represented the very best of her career. And you know, it brought together songs that defined generations. It broke records. It touched hearts around the world. And those kinds of hits were not just chart toppers, they were the soundtrack to millions of lives and a testament to a voice that will never be duplicated. So, you know, celebrating her No. 1s is really a no-brainer."

The album was also released to digital and streaming platforms. Along with the number-one pop hits, the expanded edition of the collection includes her 1988 Olympics anthem, "One Moment in Time" (a number one hit on the US Adult Contemporary chart), her self-produced rendition of "I Believe in You and Me" (number one US Adult R&B Songs), from the soundtrack to her 1996 film, The Preacher's Wife and "Higher Love" (US number one Dance Club Songs), her posthumous 2019 hit with Kygo as well as numerous popular remixes of her hits spreading her entire career.

Included for the first time on a streaming platform is the L.A. Reid and Babyface remix of Houston's 1991 hit "My Name Is Not Susan", which included a rap from female British rapper Monie Love, which produced one of the first collaborations between a major pop artist and a rapper. The album's release also coincided with the news of Houston being honored with her own Barbie doll by Mattel in the style of the "I Wanna Dance with Somebody" music video.

== Chart performance ==
WH1TNEY entered the Billboard 200 albums chart for the week of August 22, 2026, at number 148 with estimated sales of 11,000 copies, marking her sixteenth album to chart and making her the sixth female artist to have a new album charting in five or more decades. (Note: Following Barbra Streisand, Cher, Aretha Franklin, Diana Ross and Madonna.) It also debuted at number 44 on the Top R&B/Hip-Hop Albums chart, becoming her milestone 15th career entry and the first time since 2017 that she's charted on the Top R&B/Hip-Hop Albums chart, and number 20 on the Top R&B Albums chart, her third top 20 album to chart there.

== Track listing ==
LP edition
| No. | Title | Original album | Length |
|---|---|---|---|
| 1. | "I Wanna Dance with Somebody (Who Loves Me)" (single version) | Whitney | 4:52 |
| 2. | "Greatest Love of All" | Whitney Houston | 4:58 |
| 3. | "I'm Your Baby Tonight" | I'm Your Baby Tonight | 5:01 |
| 4. | "Didn't We Almost Have It All" (7" mix) | Whitney | 4:38 |
| 5. | "Where Do Broken Hearts Go" | Whitney | 4:38 |
| 6. | "I Will Always Love You" | The Bodyguard: Original Soundtrack Album | 4:31 |
| 7. | "All the Man That I Need" | I'm Your Baby Tonight | 3:55 |
| 8. | "So Emotional" (single version) | Whitney | 4:02 |
| 9. | "How Will I Know" | Whitney Houston | 4:35 |
| 10. | "Saving All My Love for You" (Ultimate Collection edit) | Whitney Houston | 3:47 |
| 11. | "Exhale (Shoop Shoop)" | Waiting to Exhale: Original Soundtrack Album | 3:21 |

Digital extended edition
| No. | Title | Original album | Length |
|---|---|---|---|
| 12. | "One Moment in Time" | 1988 Summer Olympics Album: One Moment in Time | 4:47 |
| 13. | "I Believe in You and Me" (Record Version) | The Preacher's Wife: Original Soundtrack Album | 3:53 |
| 14. | "How Will I Know" (Dance Remix) | Whitney Houston | 6:33 |
| 15. | "I Wanna Dance with Somebody (Who Loves Me)" (12" Remix) | Whitney | 8:28 |
| 16. | "So Emotional" (Extended Remix) | Whitney | 7:52 |
| 17. | "Love Will Save the Day" (Extended Remix) | Whitney | 7:59 |
| 18. | "I'm Your Baby Tonight" (Yvonne Turner Remix) | I'm Your Baby Tonight | 4:11 |
| 19. | "My Name Is Not Susan" (L.A. Reid and Babyface Remix) | I'm Your Baby Tonight | 5:57 |
| 20. | "Queen of the Night" (CJ Mackintosh Mix) | The Bodyguard: Original Soundtrack Album | 3:46 |
| 21. | "I'm Every Woman" (Every Woman's House/Club Mix Radio Edit) | The Bodyguard: Original Soundtrack Album | 4:43 |
| 22. | "Step by Step" (Junior's Arena Anthem Radio Mix) | The Preacher's Wife: Original Soundtrack Album | 4:06 |
| 23. | "It's Not Right but It's Okay" (Thunderpuss Radio Mix) | My Love Is Your Love | 4:17 |
| 24. | "Heartbreak Hotel" (Hex Hector Radio Mix) (featuring Faith Evans and Kelly Price) | My Love Is Your Love | 4:21 |
| 25. | "My Love Is Your Love" (Jonathan Peters Radio Mix) | My Love Is Your Love | 4:19 |
| 26. | "I Learned From the Best" (HQ2 Radio Mix) | My Love Is Your Love | 4:24 |
| 27. | "Love That Man" (Peter Rauhofer Mix) | Just Whitney | 4:07 |
| 28. | "Try It on My Own" (Thunderpuss Radio Mix) | Just Whitney | 4:40 |
| 29. | "Whatchulookinat" (Full Intention Club Mix) | Just Whitney | 7:01 |
| 30. | "Million Dollar Bill" (Frankie Knuckles Radio Mix) | I Look to You | 3:16 |
| 31. | "I Look to You" (Johnny Vicious Warehouse Radio Mix) | I Look to You | 4:10 |
| 32. | "Higher Love" (featuring Kygo) | Golden Hour | 3:48 |

== Charts ==
Weekly chart performance for WH1TNEY
| Chart (2026) | Peak position |
|---|---|
| US Billboard 200 | 148 |
| US Top R&B/Hip-Hop Albums (Billboard) | 44 |
