= Philanthropy and advocacy of Whitney Houston =

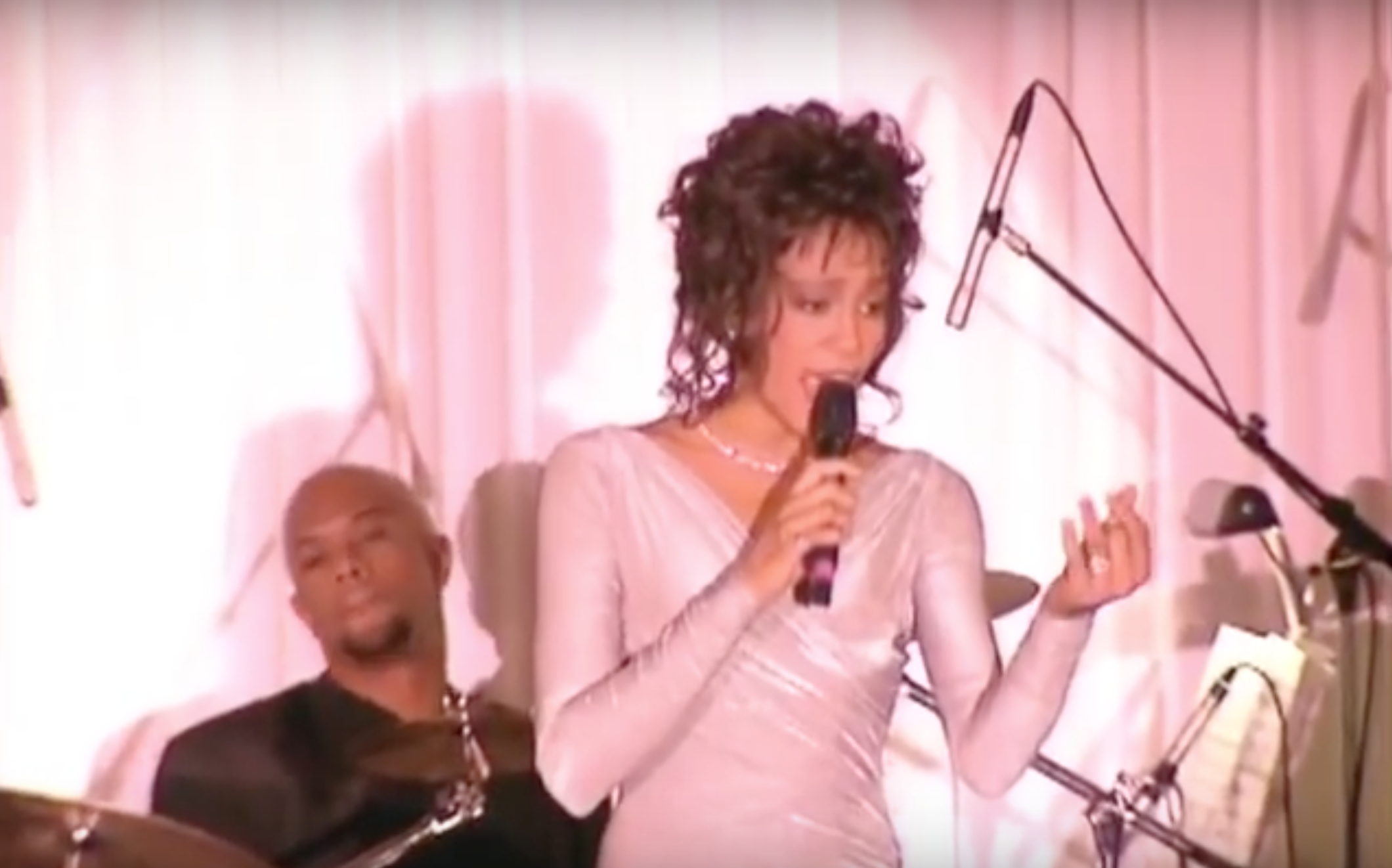
Houston performing at a state dinner in the White House honoring South African president Nelson Mandela in 1994

American singer and actress Whitney Houston was well-known for her philanthropy and public advocacy. Her charitable activities particularly focused on the welfare of children, education, health research, particularly when it came to HIV/AIDS, and causes benefiting communities in her native New Jersey. In support of those efforts, she established the Whitney Houston Foundation for Children in 1989. Houston heavily donated to and supported multiple charities throughout her career. During the 1980s, Houston advocated against apartheid in South Africa and refused modeling and musical engagements in the country as a boycott while her music made her an icon for feminism and LGBT rights.

== Musical advocacy ==
Around the start of her career, in January 1986, Houston was one of the main vocalists behind the song "King Holiday", alongside Stephanie Mills, El DeBarge, Teena Marie, New Edition, Menudo, Lisa Lisa, Full Force, Stacy Lattisaw and James "J.T." Taylor as part of the King Dream Chorus with the King Holiday Crew (Kurtis Blow, Run-DMC, Whodini, the Fat Boys and Melle Mel) in honor of Martin Luther King Jr. Day, which was observed as a national holiday in the United States on January 20, 1986 to commemorate the legacy of civil rights activist Martin Luther King Jr. Co-produced by King's youngest son Dexter, the song became a hit, reaching number 30 on the Hot Black Singles chart. All proceeds of the song's sales went into the King Center in Atlanta.

Some of Houston's music was praised for delivering positive social messages. In 1985, Stephen Holden of The New York Times wrote of her iconic rendition of "Greatest Love of All": "Houston sings [the song] with a forceful directness that gives its message of self-worth an astounding resonance and conviction" and called the song a compelling assertion of spiritual devotion, black pride, and family loyalty, all at once." In his review of Houston's sophomore album, Whitney, Vince Aletti of Rolling Stone raved the album's fifth hit single "Love Will Save the Day" as "the only song to even remotely acknowledge the problems of the world at large."

Houston's 1993 hit rendition of "I'm Every Woman" was regarded as a "feminist anthem" by several critics. In 2025, Ebony magazine mentioned the Houston rendition in their article, "The Evolution of Black Female Empowerment Anthems", writing, "[Houston] paid homage to Chaka Khan’s original version and transformed it into a soaring anthem for female solidarity." It was included alongside other black feminist anthems such as Sister Rosetta Tharpe's "Strange Things Happening Every Day", Aretha Franklin's "Respect", Janet Jackson's "Control", Lauryn Hill's "Doo Wop (That Thing)" and Destiny's Child's "Independent Women Part 1". The music video of the song featured Houston performing it with other notable female artists such as the R&B group TLC, the song's original composer Valerie Simpson, mother Cissy Houston and the song's original performer Chaka Khan along with Houston's female backup dancers. It later won the NAACP Image Award for Outstanding Music Video.

Some of Houston's hits were considered anthems in the LGBT community, including "I Wanna Dance with Somebody (Who Loves Me)" and "It's Not Right but It's Okay". Said Gerrick Kennedy in 2022 to CNN: "She was really the first one to do those big house remixes in a way we weren’t really seeing from Black girls. There was an element of performance in a space where queer people, especially Black queer people, were able to find freedom and liberation. That’s our connection with diva figures – how they make us feel, and it’s usually rooted in some form of liberation." Kennedy noted the release of Houston's critically acclaimed 1998 album, My Love Is Your Love, as "the moment when I, a Black queer boy growing up in the Midwest, which was super oppressive, felt free."

Journalists and music reviewers have cited Houston's iconic rendition of "The Star-Spangled Banner" at Super Bowl XXV as a powerful political and social statement of its own for African Americans. Cinque Henderson wrote in a 2016 article about the performance in The New Yorker that Houston's rendition of the song was "the most influential performance of a national song since Marian Anderson sang "My Country, 'Tis of Thee" on the steps of the Lincoln Memorial on the eve of the Second World War." Henderson further added that Houston's re-arrangement of the song helped to change African Americans' often-negative feelings about the national anthem, writing, "By making the idea of freedom the emotional and structural high point (not just the high note) of the anthem, Houston unlocked that iron door for black people and helped make the song a part of our cultural patrimony, too." Henderson explained that Houston's version "wasn't just a revolution in music; it was a revolution in meaning." Writer Daphne A. Brooks wrote in her 2012 obituary on Houston for The Nation of the rendition that by "not just hitting that note but living in it and by finally and absolutely killing it, Whitney Houston – a black woman born just weeks before the March on Washington, raised by pioneering artists like mother Cissy, cousin Dionne and godmother Aretha – willed herself into America's narrative of freedom and democracy through the sheer crushing command of her voice. That day, she staged a struggle on the battlefield of song and cemented her title as the voice of the post-civil rights era."

== Anti-apartheid advocacy ==
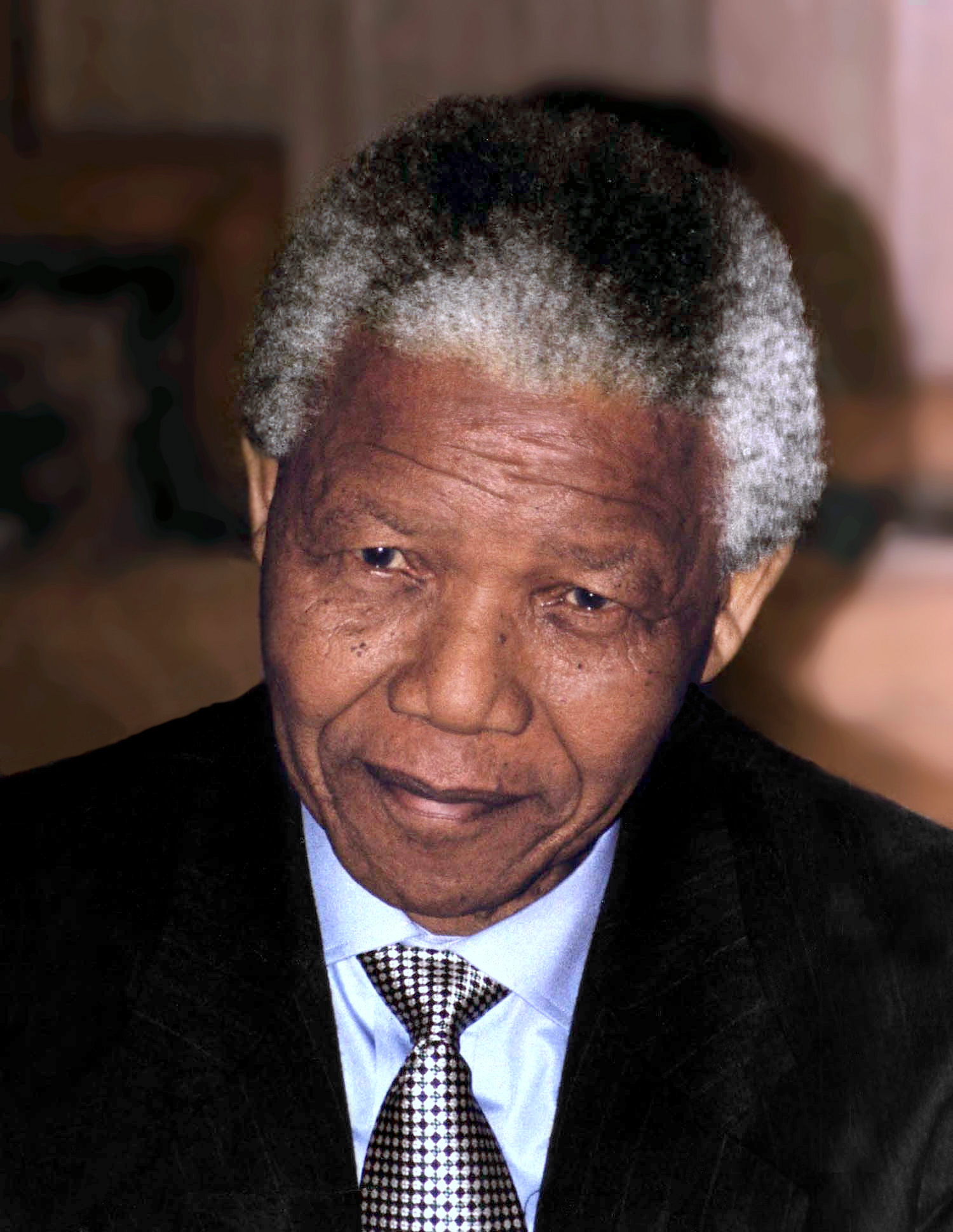
Houston supported Nelson Mandela (pictured in 1994) and the anti-apartheid movement in South Africa throughout the early years of her career.

During her earlier careers as a fashion model and as a singer, Houston showed support to Nelson Mandela and the anti-apartheid movement. During the early 1980s, Houston refused to let her modeling agency book her photoshoot engagements in apartheid-era South Africa. Despite her popularity as a singer there, she also refused to book shows in the country's stadiums.

She participated in the Nelson Mandela 70th Birthday Tribute concert at London's Wembley Stadium on June 11, 1988, which was watched by more than half a billion viewers and raised $1 million in charities, while also bringing awareness to apartheid. The concert helped to influence the decision to parole Mandela in February 1990, which occurred roughly 20 months after the concert.

Prince Mensah of One Ghana, One Voice honored Houston's activism against the apartheid of South Africa, writing, "Whitney Houston was one of the few African-Americans who believed in Africa long before it became fashionable in the United States. She celebrated her identity as a Black person in many ways. As a person born in segregated times, she chose a front seat role in fighting against prejudice. Some people might choose to remember only her struggles, but Africa remembers her as a sister, a queen, a trailblazer and an inspiration. She truly left indelible footprints in our lives." Mensah added Houston's refusal to book modeling and later musical appointments in the region "cemented her status as an icon among Africans, who felt she was one of the few bridges between their continent and the rest of the world."

In October 1994, Houston attended and performed at a state dinner in the White House honoring newly elected South African president Nelson Mandela.

At the end of her world tour the following month, Houston performed three concerts in South Africa to honor President Mandela, playing to more than 200,000 people; this made her the first major musician to visit the newly unified and apartheid free nation following Mandela's winning election. Portions of Whitney: The Concert for a New South Africa were broadcast live on HBO with funds of the concerts being donated to various charities in South Africa.

== Children and education ==
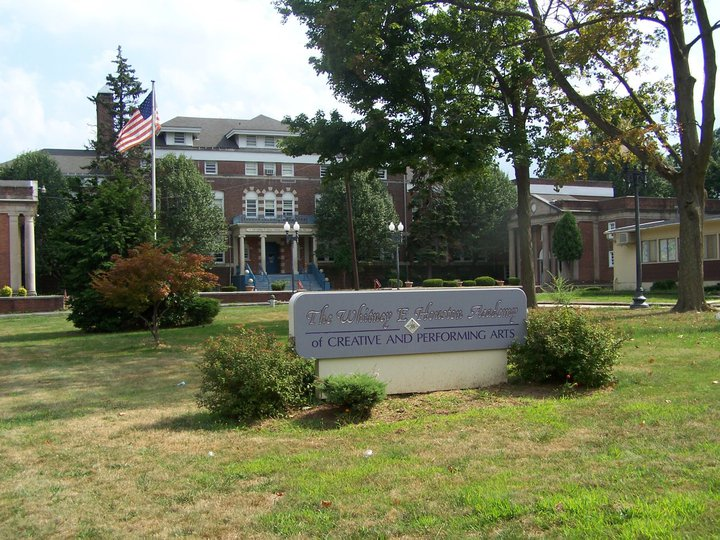
In 1997, Houston's childhood school, Franklin School in East Orange, New Jersey, was renamed the Whitney E. Houston Academy of Creative and Performing Arts.

In 1989, she established the Whitney Houston Foundation for Children. It offered medical assistance to sick and homeless children, fought to prevent child abuse, taught children to read, created inner-city parks and playgrounds and granted college scholarships, including one to the Juilliard School. During the Christmas season, the foundation hosted Christmas parties for homeless children. In addition, Houston used the foundation to donate proceeds in major events, including her 1992 wedding to singer Bobby Brown, the Los Angeles premiere of her film, The Bodyguard and the premiere of her other film, The Preacher's Wife.

The same year her foundation opened, Houston provided a pair of lion cubs she named George and Gracie, after celebrated entertainment couple George Burns and his wife Gracie Allen, to the Bronx Zoo, after hearing of the zoo's sought of lion cubs. At a press conference held at the zoo, Houston stated, "For a long time I wanted to take my own love for animals one step farther. When it came to my attention that the Bronx Zoo was seeking lion cubs, it seemed like a very special and rare opportunity to get involved with an effort that goes beyond a personal affinity for animals, to help ensure that the creatures of the earth will be protected for future generations." Houston picked up the tab for their care for a year. The day of her announcement, she revisited her former childhood school in nearby East Orange, New Jersey.

At a 1988 Madison Square Garden concert, Houston earned more than $250,000 for the United Negro College Fund (UNCF). For her efforts, Houston received the UNCF Frederick D. Patterson Award in March 1990.

In October 1988, Houston performed on the Channel Seven Perth Telethon in Perth to raise funds for several children's hospitals there.

In 1990, Houston donated proceeds from concerts she gave that year to three charities, the Boys Choir of Harlem, the New Jersey State PBA and the Youth of Atlantic City.

In addition to advocating for further education and the well being of children, Houston helped to fund money to hospitals to help children in need and often visited hospitals to tend to sick children. Due to her humanitarian aid and support, Houston was honored by the hospitals where some of them had particular areas renamed after the singer.

The Feingold Center for Children in Boston had its Hearing & Language Disorder Clinic renamed after the singer after she contributed to the hospital.

In June 1995, it was reported that Houston donated $125,000 to Harlem's Hale House Center to help mothers who were at risk of abusing their children. Later, the Hale House Center built a Learning & Recreation Center due to Houston's donations.

Houston also donated money to the St. Jude Children's Research Hospital. Newark's University Hospital renamed its Pediatric Special Care Unit the Whitney Houston Intensive Care Unit after Houston's contributions to the hospital.

In 1997, in tribute to her career, humanitarianism and advocacy, Houston's old elementary school she attended as a child in East Orange, New Jersey, Franklin School, was renamed the Whitney E. Houston Academy of Creative and Performing Arts. Houston personally attended the renaming ceremony at the school.

== Community advocacy ==
In November 1988, Houston announced plans to invest in a $100 million housing project set up by Vogue Skyview Estates, a real estate development firm, to create low and middle-income housing in her hometown of Newark, New Jersey.

According to her friend, New Hope Baptist Church minister Reverend DeForest Soaries, Houston "inherited from both of her parents a keen but little known interest in, and passion for, issues, projects and people that improved the plight of blacks and other disadvantaged populations."

Continued Soaries: "Whenever we spoke over the years, Whitney always took an interest in discussing whatever community project I was working on and she herself was determined to make a difference in people’s lives. She supported many local groups financially– almost always anonymously. She also gave help to some local politicians."

== Charitable donations from music and concerts ==
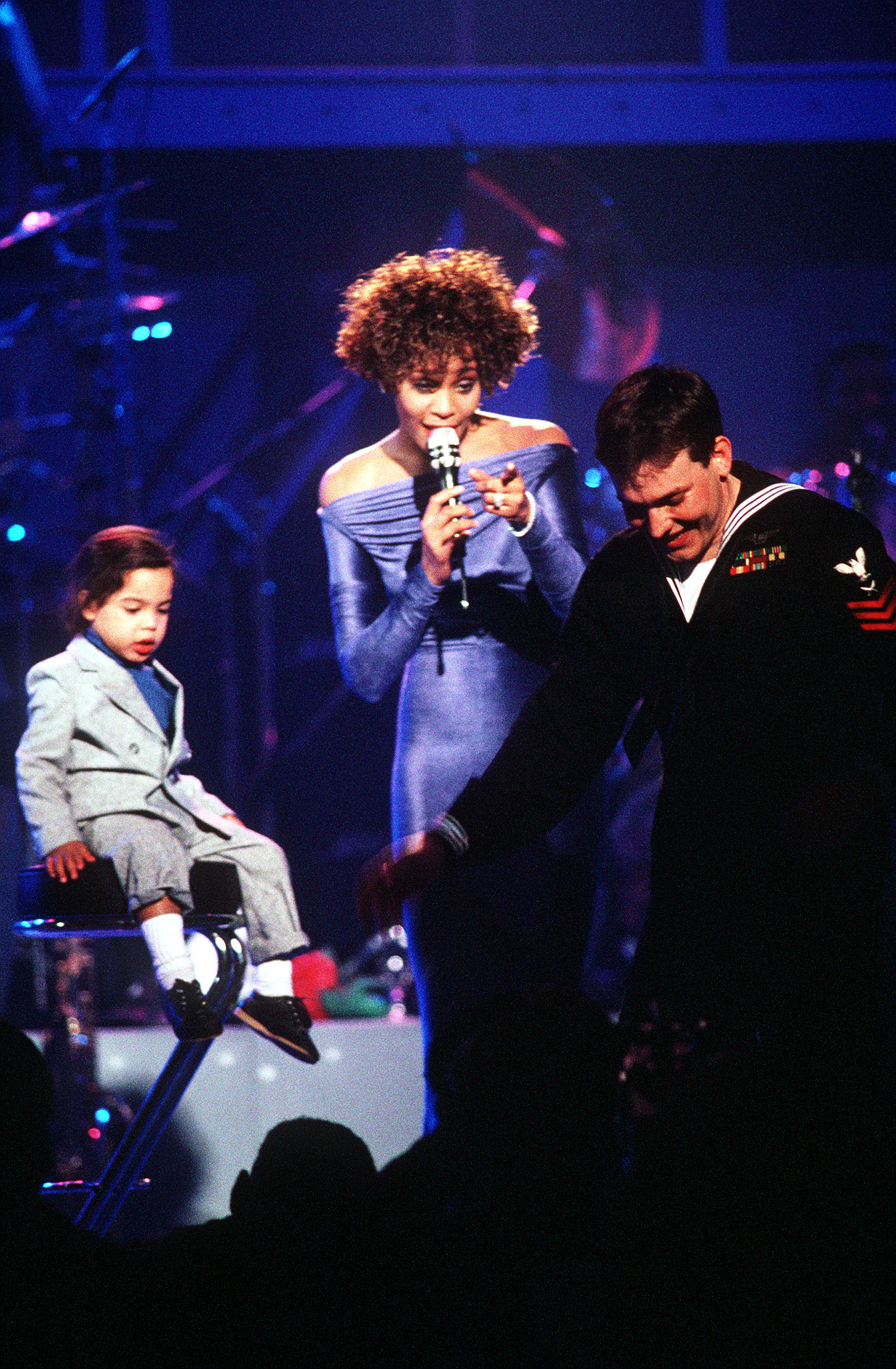
Houston performing at the Welcome Home Heroes with Whitney Houston concert, 1991

In 1987, Houston participated at the opening ceremonies of the Special Olympics Summer Games in Notre Dame, Indiana, singing her hits "Love Will Save the Day" and "Didn't We Almost Have It All". Later in the year, she recorded her popular rendition of "Do You Hear What I Hear?" for the album, A Very Special Christmas, which proceeds went directly to the Special Olympics organization.

In August 1988, Houston's hit "One Moment in Time" was included in the Arista Records compilation album, 1988 Summer Olympics Album: One Moment in Time, with proceeds of the album benefiting the athletes who participated in the 1988 Summer Olympics in Seoul and their families.

Houston donated all of the earnings from her 1991 Super Bowl XXV performance of "The Star-Spangled Banner" sales to Gulf War servicemen and their families. Her record label, Arista Records, followed suit and she was voted to the American Red Cross Board of Directors as a result.

On Easter Sunday 1991, Houston hosted her first televised concert special, Welcome Home Heroes with Whitney Houston, at the Norfolk Naval Air Base in front of returning troops from the Gulf War, with the concert proceeds going directly to the Red Cross. The singer and the network agreed to give a free, unscrambled concert so everyone could watch. The special became HBO's most viewed concert in history at the time with over 50 million viewers watching.

Later in 1991, Houston continued her Gulf War charitable work when she participated in the televised concert special, The Simple Truth: A Concert for Kurdish Refugees, having taped her show at the Oakland Arena for the occasion.

Proceeds of Houston's two one woman show sold-out concerts at the DAR Constitution Hall in Washington, D.C. for her Classic Whitney: Live from Washington, D.C. concert special, taped live in October 1997, went to Marian Wright Edelman's Children's Defense Fund and were commemorated on the 100th anniversary of operatic singer Marian Anderson's birthday; significant due to Anderson famously being denied a concert there by the Daughters of the American Revolution due to her being Black. Houston's shows eventually raised $300,000 for the Children's Defense Fund.

Following the terrorist attacks in 2001, Houston re-released "The Star-Spangled Banner" to support the New York Firefighters 9/11 Disaster Relief Fund and the New York Fraternal Order of Police. She waived her royalty rights to the song, which reached number one on charts in October 2001 and generated more than $1 million.

During her historic South African tour in 1994, Houston donated all of its concert proceeds to numerous children's charities, including two children's museums, the President's Trust Fund (for Nelson Mandela) and the Kasigo Trust among several orphanages.

In 2004, Houston headlined her first concerts in Russia following the news of a terrorist attack in Moscow; the proceeds of the sold out concerts held in Moscow and St. Petersburg were sent to the Russian Air Fund. Upon her return to Russia at the start of her Nothing but Love World Tour in 2009, Houston dedicated her comeback hit "I Look to You" to victims of a nightclub fire in Perm.

== HIV/AIDS and LGBTQ advocacy ==
Houston was an activist for the fight against HIV/AIDS during the first decade of the AIDS epidemic. In 1986, the LGBT magazine publication The Advocate reported that one of Houston's concerts at the Boston Common in Boston raised $30,000 for the AIDS Action Committee of Massachusetts and the Gay and Lesbian Counseling Service. The Whitney Houston Foundation for Children, in particular, focused on helping children who suffered from HIV/AIDS, among other issues. In 1990, Houston took part in Arista Records' 15th anniversary gala, which was an AIDS benefit, where she sang "I Wanna Dance with Somebody (Who Loves Me)", "Greatest Love of All" and, with cousin Dionne Warwick, "That's What Friends Are For".

A year later, Houston participated in the Reach Out & Touch Someone AIDS vigil at London in September 1991 while she was finishing her historic ten-date residency at London's Wembley Arena; there, she stressed the importance of AIDS research and addressing HIV stigma.

In January 1994, during the middle of her Bodyguard World Tour in South America, Houston returned to the United States to perform a stirring rendition of BeBe & CeCe Winans' "Don't Cry" at the Commitment to Life VII AIDS Benefit in Los Angeles.

In June 1999, Houston gave a surprise performance at the 13th Annual New York City Lesbian & Gay Pride Dance at one of the city's West Side piers. According to Instinct magazine, Houston's unannounced performance at the Piers "ushered in a new era that would eventually make high-profile artists performing at LGBTQ events virtually commonplace". Before hitting the stage, Houston was asked by MTV veejay John Norris why she decided to attend the event. Houston replied, "We're all God's children, honey".

== Other humanitarian efforts ==
In April 1994, in the middle of her tour at the time, Houston gave a surprising appearance at rocker Sting and wife Trudie Styler's biannual Rock for the Rainforest benefit concert, which funds projects that benefit the indigenous peoples of the world's rainforests. The 1994 concert was hailed at Carnegie Hall and is noted for Houston performing Stevie Wonder's "If It's Magic" and her landmark hit "I Will Always Love You" as well as a later viral moment capturing Houston singing "La donna è mobile" from Giuseppe Verdi's Rigoletto alongside Luciano Pavarotti, Sting and Elton John to theirs and the audience's delight.

In 2000, Houston joined a celebrity petition by international debt relief campaign Jubilee 2000 to persuade world leaders to erase debt owed by 40 of the world's poorest nations.

== Recognition for philanthropic work ==
Houston was honored for her humanitarian and philanthropy work. In 1988, the National Urban Coalition honored her with the Distinguished Artist/Humanitarian Award for her education advocacy made during a public service announcement. In 1990, she received the Frederick D. Patterson Award at the United Negro College Fund for her long-standing dedication to Black higher education. That same year, then-President George H. W. Bush invited her to the White House where he made Houston contributing leader to the Points of Light.

In 1992, Houston won the Brass Ring Award at the Carousel of Hope Ball from the Children's Diabetes Foundation. Four years later, at the same event in 1996, the organization honored her with the Davises' High Hopes Award.

In 1995, Houston received the VH1 Honors Award for the success of her Whitney Houston Foundation for Children organization. In 1997, Houston won the Essence award for Triumphant Spirit due to her years in advocacy.

In 1999, she received the Child Advocate of the Year by the Deirdre O’Brien Child Advocacy Center. In 2004, she received a lifetime achievement award as a humanitarian at the Women's World Awards.

Awards bestowed upon Houston reflecting her philanthropic and humanitarian work include:

Name of the honor, year the honor was awarded, category and type of honor
Honor	Year (Note: Indicates the year of ceremony. Each year is linked to the article about the awards held that year, wherever possible.)	Category	Type	Ref.
Carousel of Hope Ball (The Children's Diabetes Foundation)	1992	Brass Ring Award	Honoree	
Carousel of Hope Ball (The Children's Diabetes Foundation)	1996	The Davises' High Hopes Award	Honoree	
Deirdre O’Brien Child Advocacy Center	1999	Child Advocate of the Year	Honoree (Note: The Whitney Houston Foundation for Children contributed $40,000 for the construction of a medical examination room at the center, equipped with the latest forensic medical equipment to assist investigations of alleged child sexual abuse.)	
Essence Awards	1997	The Triumphant Spirit Award	Honoree	
National Urban Coalition	1988	Distinguished Artist/Humanitarian Award	Honoree (Note: Houston earned the award for charitable acts including a public service announcement urging minority youth to study science and math, and participation on an Arista Records charity album whose proceeds went to the United Negro College Fund.)	
Presidential awards	1990	Points of Light Contributing Leader	Honoree	
United Negro College Fund	1990	The Frederick D. Patterson Award	Honoree (Note: Houston was honored for her long-standing dedication to Black higher education.)	
VH1 Honors	1995	Humanitarian Award	Honoree (Note: Houston earned the award for her charitable works with the Whitney Houston Foundation for Children, Inc.)	
Women's World Awards	2004	World Arts Award for Lifetime Achievement (Note: Shared with Dionne Warwick.)	Honoree	

== See also ==
- List of Whitney Houston records and achievements
- List of awards and nominations received by Whitney Houston
