= Death of Whitney Houston =

2012 death of American singer and actress

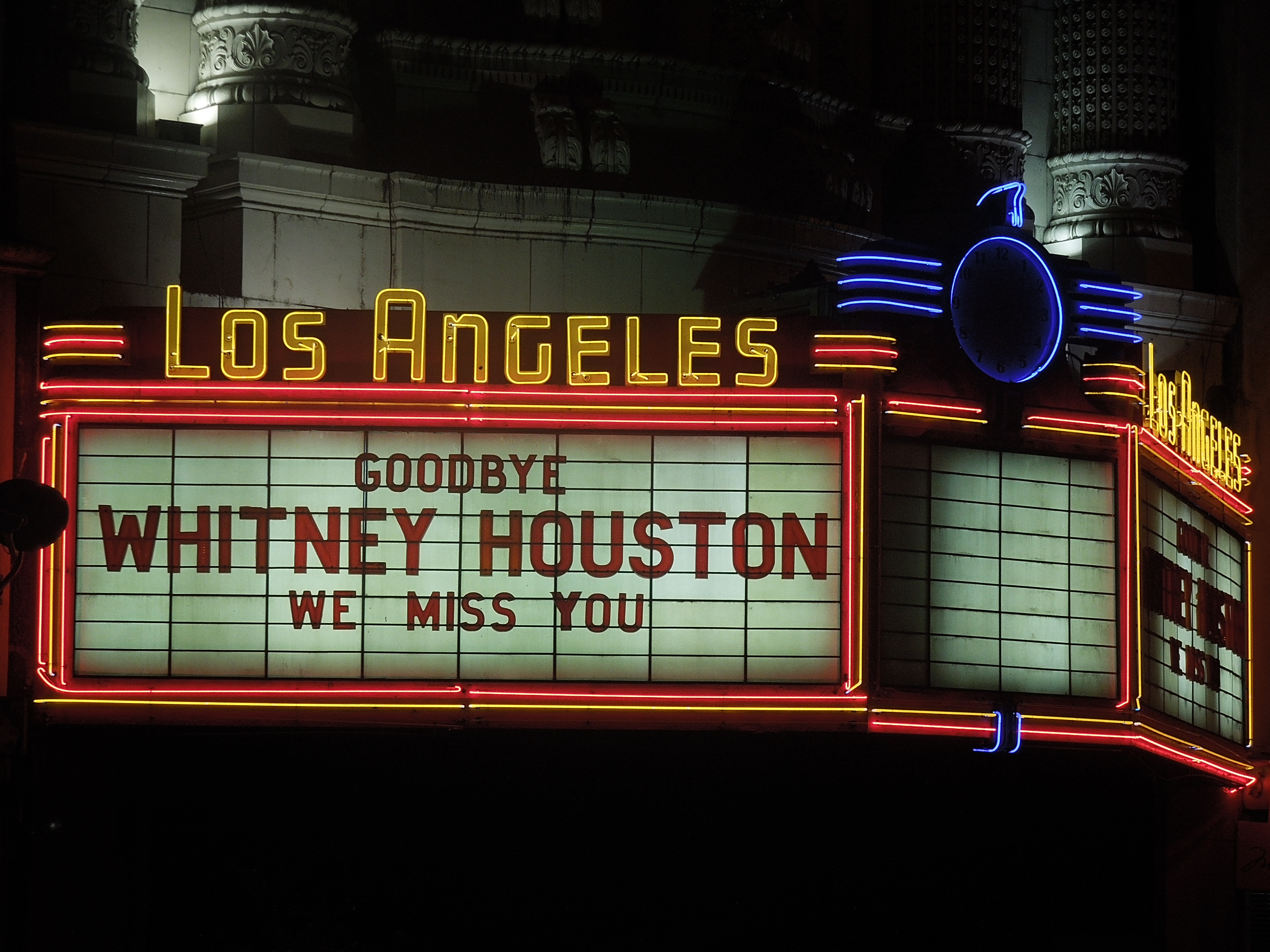
- A "We miss you" message displayed for Whitney Houston at the Los Angeles Theatre following her death, February 11, 2012
- Date: February 11, 2012; 14 years ago
- Time: 3:55 p.m. (Pacific Standard Time)
- Location: Beverly Hills, California, U.S.
- Type: Accidental drowning
- Cause: Atherosclerotic heart disease and cocaine use effects
- Deaths: Whitney Houston
- Coroner: Los Angeles County Department of Medical Examiner

On February 11, 2012, American singer and actress Whitney Houston died of an accidental drowning in Beverly Hills, California, at age 48. Houston was found unconscious by her security guard Ray Watson and her personal assistant Mary Jones at the Beverly Hilton, submerged in the bathtub. Paramedics treated Houston at the scene around 3:30 p.m. Pacific Standard Time (UTC–8) and performed cardiopulmonary resuscitation (CPR), but she was pronounced dead at 3:55 p.m. The cause of her death was not immediately known; local police said there were "no obvious signs of criminal intent".

On March 22, 2012, the Los Angeles County Department of Medical Examiner's Office concluded that her death was from accidental drowning, which had been caused by the "effects of atherosclerotic heart disease and cocaine use". Houston also had marijuana and several prescription medications in her system.

At the time of her death, Houston had been planning for the release of her box-office film Sparkle and was set to attend Clive Davis's pre-Grammy party, which was held at the hotel. Davis was later criticized for going on with the scheduled party, which turned into a tribute to Houston, instead of canceling it. Her death coincided with the 2012 Grammy Awards, which took place the following night and featured numerous tributes to Houston, producing the second highest ratings in the show's history.

Houston's death received prominent international media coverage along with her memorial service, which took place on February 18. News of her death broke Internet and television records. Following her death, numerous posthumous albums and songs by Houston were released, including the international hit single "Higher Love" (featuring Kygo). Guinness World Records named Houston the highest-grossing posthumous female celebrity. Her life was the subject of several documentaries and biopics, including the 2018 documentary Whitney and the 2022 biopic I Wanna Dance with Somebody.

== Background ==
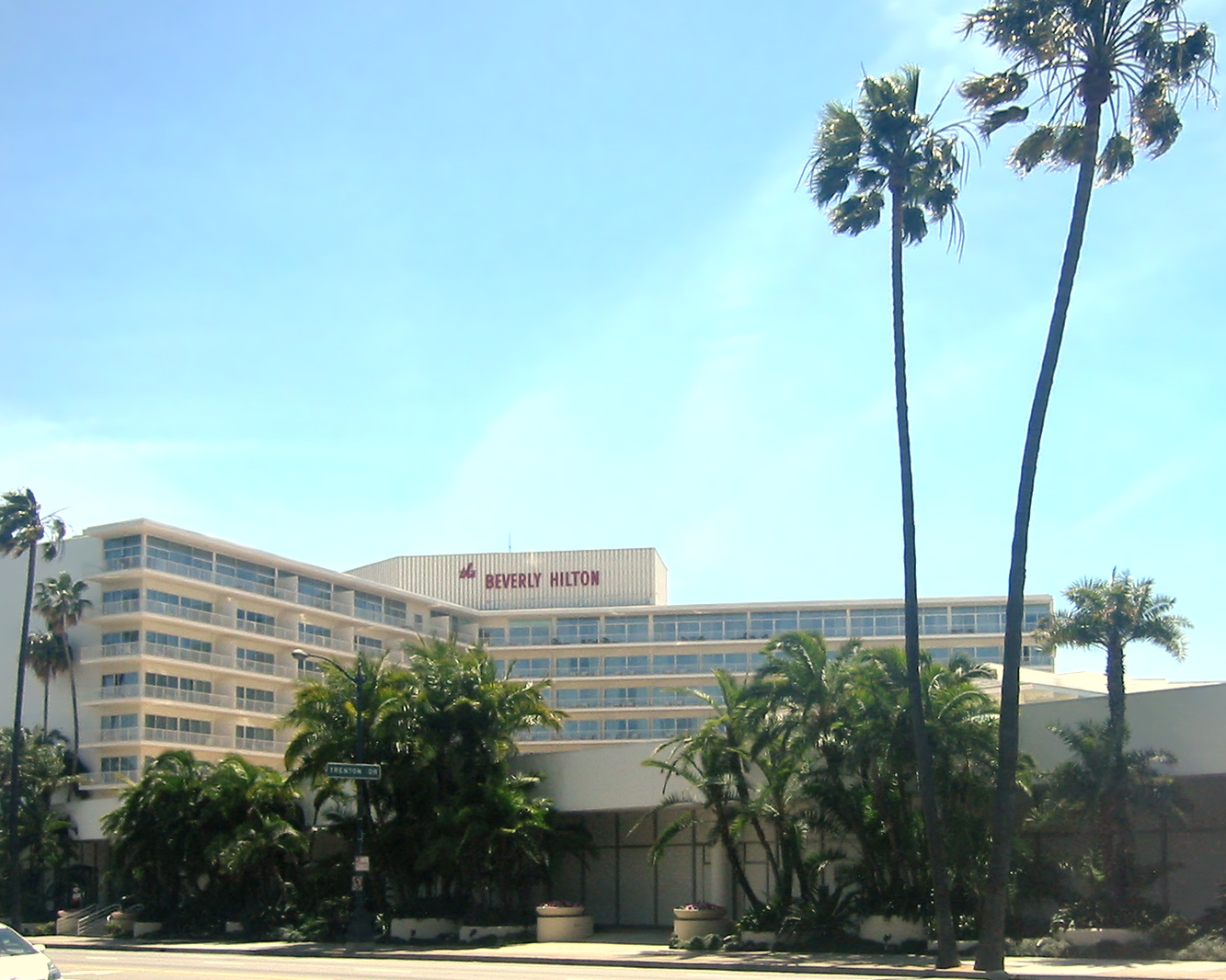
The Beverly Hilton hotel in Beverly Hills, California, where Houston's body was found.

Houston arrived to Beverly Hills, California on February 2, 2012. That day, she booked a suite at the Beverly Hilton with her entourage, which included her manager and sister-in-law Pat Garland Houston, half-brother Gary Garland Houston, and daughter Bobbi Kristina Brown, among others. According to reports, Houston had booked herself on the fourth floor of the suite. On February 5, Houston watched Super Bowl XLVI at a bar inside the Beverly Wilshire Hotel and cameras spotted the singer dancing and singing along to Madonna, who was headlining its halftime show that year. According to reports, Houston wasn't drinking alcohol as had been claimed.

Earlier that night, Houston and her daughter were seen at a restaurant with ex-husband, singer Bobby Brown, celebrating his 43rd birthday. Following their acrimonious divorce in 2007, the former couple had grown more friendly towards each other in recent years. During an interview with Today host Matt Lauer, Brown said of Houston during their last meeting that the singer "had this glow about her that was just, you know, incredible. I'm saying to myself, you know, 'She must be ... she must be doing really well,' because she looked really well. ... looked like she was in a good place."

The singer was in Beverly Hills for several reasons, one of which was to record vocals for the song "Celebrate", which took place on February 7. Another was to attend Clive Davis's pre-Grammy party, which was always hosted at the hotel, that Saturday.

"Celebrate" was one of two songs Houston had recorded for the soundtrack to the film, Sparkle, her fourth box-office film and her first since The Preacher's Wife in 1996. According to the song's producer, Harvey Mason Jr., he and Houston "were dancing around the booth and laughing and just having a good time listening to what we had accomplished. Her demeanor the last two weeks was very upbeat. She was in a good place." "Celebrate" would be Houston's final recording.

Houston had been in talks with producers of The X Factor and had scheduled a meeting with Simon Cowell the Monday after the Grammys, February 13. Houston was also in talks of reuniting with her co-stars from Waiting to Exhale on a proposed sequel, Gettin' to Happy, as well as a new album with Davis again at the helm of the project.

In the week preceding her death, Houston and Davis met up at the latter's bungalow at the Beverly Hilton where they discussed future projects together. Houston and Davis listened to the two new songs Houston recorded for Sparkle together and then, Davis recalled, Houston told him, "I want you to know I'm getting in shape. I'm swimming an hour or two a day and I'm committed to get my high notes back — no cigarettes — plenty of vocal exercising — Clive, I'll be ready by August." Davis reiterated this during an interview with CNN in 2024, saying "she knew I couldn’t believe that she was still smoking cigarettes and she showed me she had given up smoking. She had gone to some kind of throat doctor to remove all the nicotine from her throat. This was February." Davis said of Houston that she was "vital, optimistic. Looking forward to the future."

According to TMZ, Houston was frequenting the medical scene of Beverly Hills around this time, leaving one bank of medical offices on February 2, and another on February 7. TMZ reported that it was "unclear" who Houston was seeing in those two visits.

== Timeline ==
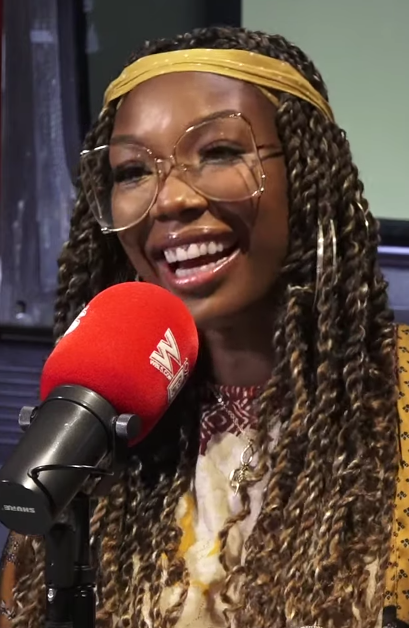
Brandy was given a secret note by Houston two days before her death.

In the final days leading up to her death, several reports came of the singer appearing "disheveled" and "erratic". On February 9, Houston interrupted a press interview by Clive Davis and singers Brandy and Monica, who were rehearsing for their performance for the pre-Grammy party. According to those who witnessed Houston's entrance stated the singer looked "visibly unwell". Houston had witnessed the two singers rehearsing prior to the visit and was seen embracing and encouraging them to perform well.

The visit produced speculation due to Houston giving Brandy a note, which the latter singer refused to reveal what was written. When initially asked what Houston wrote on the note, Brandy told reporters, "I'm going to just not say what it was and keep it to myself for my own personal reasons." In 2026, Brandy revealed in her memoirs, Phases, that she and Houston shared a three-hour conversation on the phone the day prior to Houston's death on February 10. According to Brandy, Houston gave her words of encouragement after Brandy discussed her own career struggles, telling her "never let anyone else tell you who you are", something she first repeated to her when Brandy was much younger. Houston then told Brandy, "I'm gonna be better. You'll see. This is just a season, not the whole story", which Brandy believed refer to Houston's longtime struggles with drug abuse.

Houston's longtime friend and former musical director Rickey Minor, who was part of the February 9 rehearsal with Brandy and Monica, recalled seeing Houston walking in at around "10:00 a.m." that morning, shocking Minor since Houston was a "night owl and she loves to sleep", stating "Whitney Houston does not come out into the daylight before noon — usually not before 3:00 p.m." Minor added that the singer, clad in shorts and with wet hair, told him she had "been out swimming. I started back swimming," adding "Look at the tone. And I'm getting my wind back. I'm stopping smoking, and I'm eating better." Minor stated Houston "stayed at rehearsal for nearly three hours. She was in the audience, kind of dancing and clapping along." While Minor and her band rehearsed songs by Diana Ross, who was to receive the Grammy Lifetime Achievement Award that weekend, Houston asked for a microphone to which she was rebuffed; the singer ended up singing background.

On the same day she saw Brandy and Monica, Houston attended American singer Kelly Price's "For the Love of R&B" pre-Grammy party, held at the Tru Hollywood nightclub in Hollywood, California, and sang "Jesus Loves Me" with Price, who attempted to introduce Houston before the singer walked to the stage; it would be her final public performance.

Speculation about Houston's condition following her exit from the nightclub on the morning of February 10 went rampant when some reports claimed a "belligerent" Houston clashed with Stacy Francis, a contestant of The X Factor at the club though no fight occurred. However, friends such as Price claimed the singer was "simply sweating" from her performance minutes before. "There was nothing wrong. She was singing, she was dancing, she was laughing, she was playing," Price said. The following night, February 10, she was seen at a bar of the hotel drinking and being "very loud". That same night, it was reported that Houston saved her own daughter, Bobbi Kristina, from drowning in a bathtub.

According to reports, on the day of Houston's death, February 11, she attempted to reach out to her longtime friend, gospel singer and pastor Kim Burrell and talked to her cousin, American singer Dionne Warwick and mother Cissy Houston.

According to Burrell, the two singers were supposed to attend the pre-Grammy party together. According to Burrell, Houston left a voicemail for her "at about 2 o'clock", looking and awaiting for her arrival, telling her to call back. When Burrell called back to the hotel, "there was no more and it doesn’t feel good. It will never feel good." Burrell added that in the voicemail, she could hear gospel music playing in the background and that the singer sounded happy. Said Burrell: "She was in great spirits, she was singing. I was on my way to see her and I ended up going to the hotel but I was a little too late."

With Warwick, Houston discussed where the two were going to be seated at that night's Davis pre-Grammy party while it was reported Houston and her mother talked on the phone around 3:15 p.m. that afternoon. Both women recalled Houston "appeared to be fine" on the phone.

At around 3:23 p.m., Houston was found unconscious by her personal assistant Mary Jones and her security guard Ray Watson at her room in Suite 434 at the Beverly Hilton, submerged in the bathtub. Beverly Hills paramedics arrived 3:30 p.m. and found Houston unresponsive, and performed CPR for over 20 minutes. Houston was pronounced dead at 3:55 p.m. PST. The cause of death was not immediately known; local police said there were "no obvious signs of criminal intent". Because of the pre-Grammy party festivities that were carrying on, Houston's body didn't leave the hotel until "around 1:50 a.m."

== Autopsy ==
Houston's body arrived at the Los Angeles County Coroner's Office in the Boyle Heights area of Los Angeles roughly 11 hours after she was declared dead. An autopsy was immediately conducted and completed on the same day, Sunday February 12. Assistant Chief Coroner Ed Winter said the results wouldn't be released for "6 to 8 weeks" as they awaited the completion of the toxicology report. Winter also confirmed that there were "no signs of trauma" and that foul play was "not suspected".

On March 22, 2012, the Los Angeles County Department of Medical Examiner's office reported that Houston's death was caused by drowning and the "effects of atherosclerotic heart disease and cocaine use". The office said the amount of cocaine found in Houston's body indicated that she used the substance shortly before her death. The official toxicology report found that "cocaine and metabolites" contributed to her passing. Despite the presence of cocaine in Houston's body, it was reported that it wasn't a "fatal dose".

The report also stated that the singer had been found "facedown in a blazing bathtub just feet from a spoon containing white crystals and white powder caked in a mirror." It also stated that Houston's suite was "littered with prescription drugs and open alcohol containers and sopping wet from bathtub flooding." The report also stated that Houston laid down in "approximately 13 inches of water" in the tub. Toxicology results revealed additional drugs in her system: diphenhydramine (Benadryl), alprazolam (Xanax; a benzodiazepine), cannabis, and cyclobenzaprine (Flexeril) though no drug listed contributed to her death. The report stated Houston used anti-bacterial medication to heal from a sore throat at the time. The manner of death was listed as "accident".

== Reactions ==
=== Family ===
Houston's family released a brief statement following her death:

We are devastated by the loss of our beloved Whitney. This is an unimaginable tragedy and we will miss her terribly. We appreciate the outpouring of love and support from her fans and friends.

Following her mother's death, Houston's daughter, Bobbi Kristina Brown, was described as "inconsolable" and a few days later was admitted to Cedars-Sinai Medical Center in Los Angeles: according to a family friend, Brown was "overwhelmed". Back in Newark, New Jersey, Cissy Houston recalled hearing her doorbell ringing three times with no one there. Not long afterwards, Cissy received a frantic call from her eldest son Gary Garland, who then told her that Houston was dead. Cissy stated "And that was the moment my whole world shattered."

Houston's ex-husband, singer Bobby Brown, also released his own statement following Houston's death: "I am deeply saddened at the passing of my ex-wife Whitney Houston. At this time, we ask for privacy, especially for my daughter Bobbi Kristina."

Houston's cousin, Dionne Warwick, told ABC News of Houston's death, "it's very, very surreal. It hasn't really sunk in yet. I have not had an opportunity to really mourn or completely break down, which I will do, I know that."

=== Pre-Grammy party ===
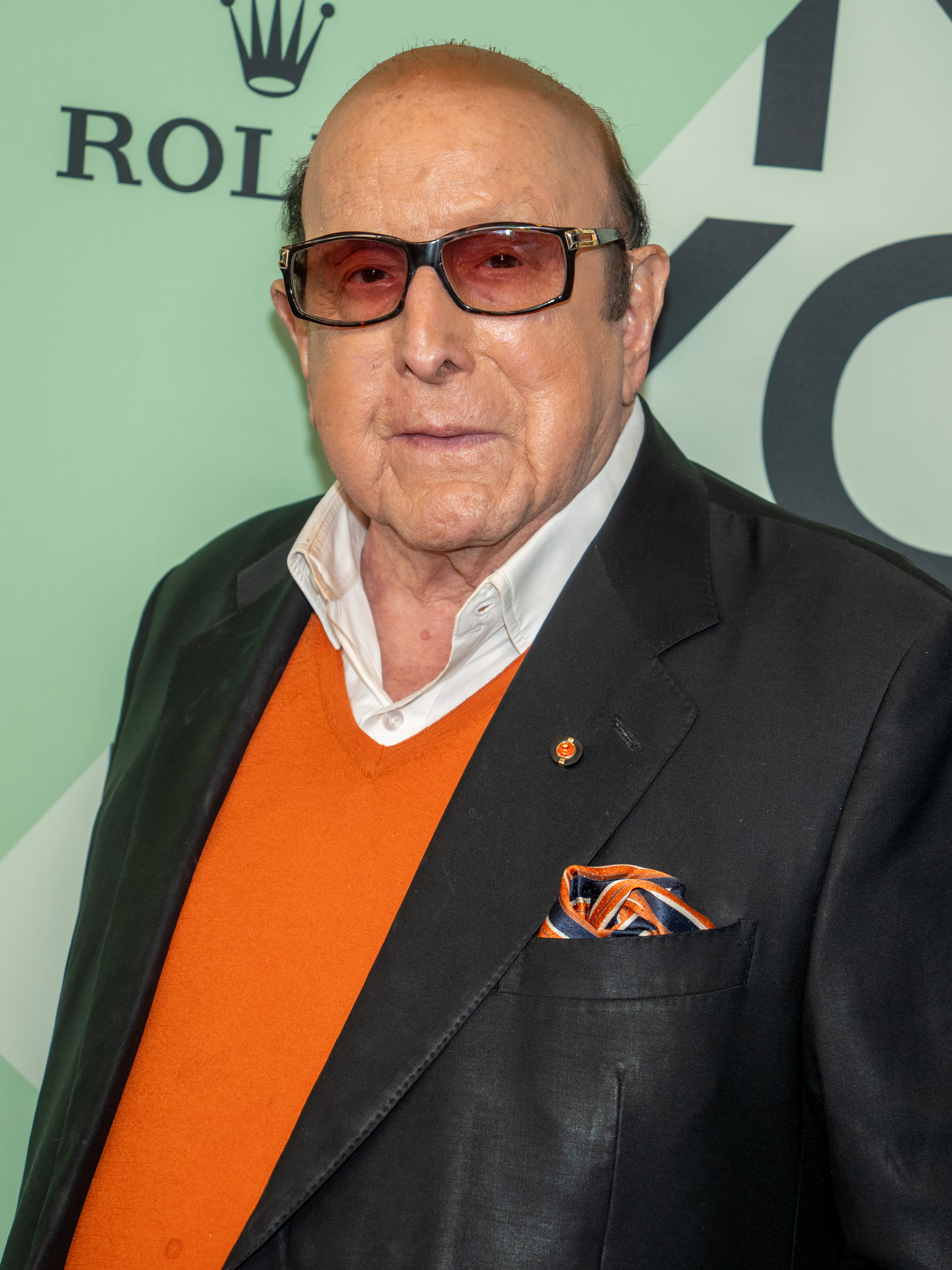
Clive Davis was criticized by some for not canceling the pre-Grammy party Houston was set to attend. Davis turned the celebration into a tribute to Houston.

The February 11, 2012 Clive Davis pre-Grammy party that Houston had been expected to attend, which featured many of the biggest names in music and film, went on as scheduled – although it was quickly turned into a tribute to Houston. Davis spoke about Houston's death at the evening's start:

By now you have all learned of the unspeakably tragic news of our beloved Whitney's passing. I don't have to mask my emotion in front of a room full of so many dear friends. I am personally devastated by the loss of someone who has meant so much to me for so many years. Whitney was so full of life. She was so looking forward to tonight even though she wasn't scheduled to perform. Whitney was a beautiful person and a talent beyond compare. She graced this stage with her regal presence and gave so many memorable performances here over the years. Simply put, Whitney would have wanted the music to go on and her family asked that we carry on.

Tony Bennett spoke of Houston's death before performing at Davis's party. He said, "First, it was Michael Jackson, then Amy Winehouse, now, the magnificent Whitney Houston." Bennett sang "How Do You Keep the Music Playing?" and said of Houston: "When I first heard her, I called Clive Davis and said, 'You finally found the greatest singer I've ever heard in my life.'"

Reports claimed the event was "surreal, somber and strange", following the news of Houston's death. Brandy and Monica, who had been scheduled to perform that night at the party canceled the performance and decided to watch the show instead. American singer Taylor Swift, one of Houston's admirers, was also scheduled to attend but decided to pass on it.

Some celebrities opposed Davis's decision to continue with the party while a police investigation was ongoing in Houston's room and her body was still in the building. Chaka Khan, in an interview with CNN's Piers Morgan on February 13, 2012, shared that she felt the party should have been canceled, saying: "I thought that was complete insanity. And knowing Whitney I don't believe that she would have said 'the show must go on.' She's the kind of woman that would've said 'Stop everything! Un-unh. I'm not going to be there.'" Sharon Osbourne said, "I think it was disgraceful that the party went on. I don't want to be in a hotel room when there's someone you admire who's tragically lost their life four floors up. I'm not interested in being in that environment and I think when you grieve someone, you do it privately, you do it with people who understand you. I thought it was so wrong."

=== Media coverage and internet activity ===
Few minutes after the Associated Press sent out a breaking news alert on Twitter (X) with the news confirmed by Houston's publicist at 4:57 p.m. PT; ABC, CBS, NBC, CNN, MSNBC, Fox News, BBC News, and Sky News all interrupted their programming to cover Houston's death, featuring interviews with those who knew her. Saturday Night Live displayed a photo of a smiling Houston from her 1996 appearance. MTV and VH1 aired many of her classic videos with news segments and celebrity reactions.

The first hour after the news of her death saw 2,481,652 X (Twitter) posts (18% of all tweets) and all of the trending topics mentioned Houston. Within 24 hours it had reached 35 million tweets, making it the most-tweeted breaking-news event in the history of X (Twitter). Her death also brought 1,532,302 hits per hour to her Wikipedia article, the highest peak traffic on any article since at least January 2010.

The anticipation for the show's tributes to Houston greatly helped increased the ratings for the 54th Grammy Awards on February 12, 2012, which became the second highest in its history with 39.9 million viewers (trailing only behind the 1984 Grammys with 51.67 million viewers). The rating was 50% higher than in 2011. This remains the highest-rated Grammy telecast on 21st-century U.S. television.

Houston topped the list of Google searches in 2012, both globally and in the United States, according to Google's Annual Zeitgeist most-popular searches list. Coverage of her death was ranked as the most memorable entertainment event in television history by a study from Sony Electronics and Nielsen Media Research.

=== Grief ===
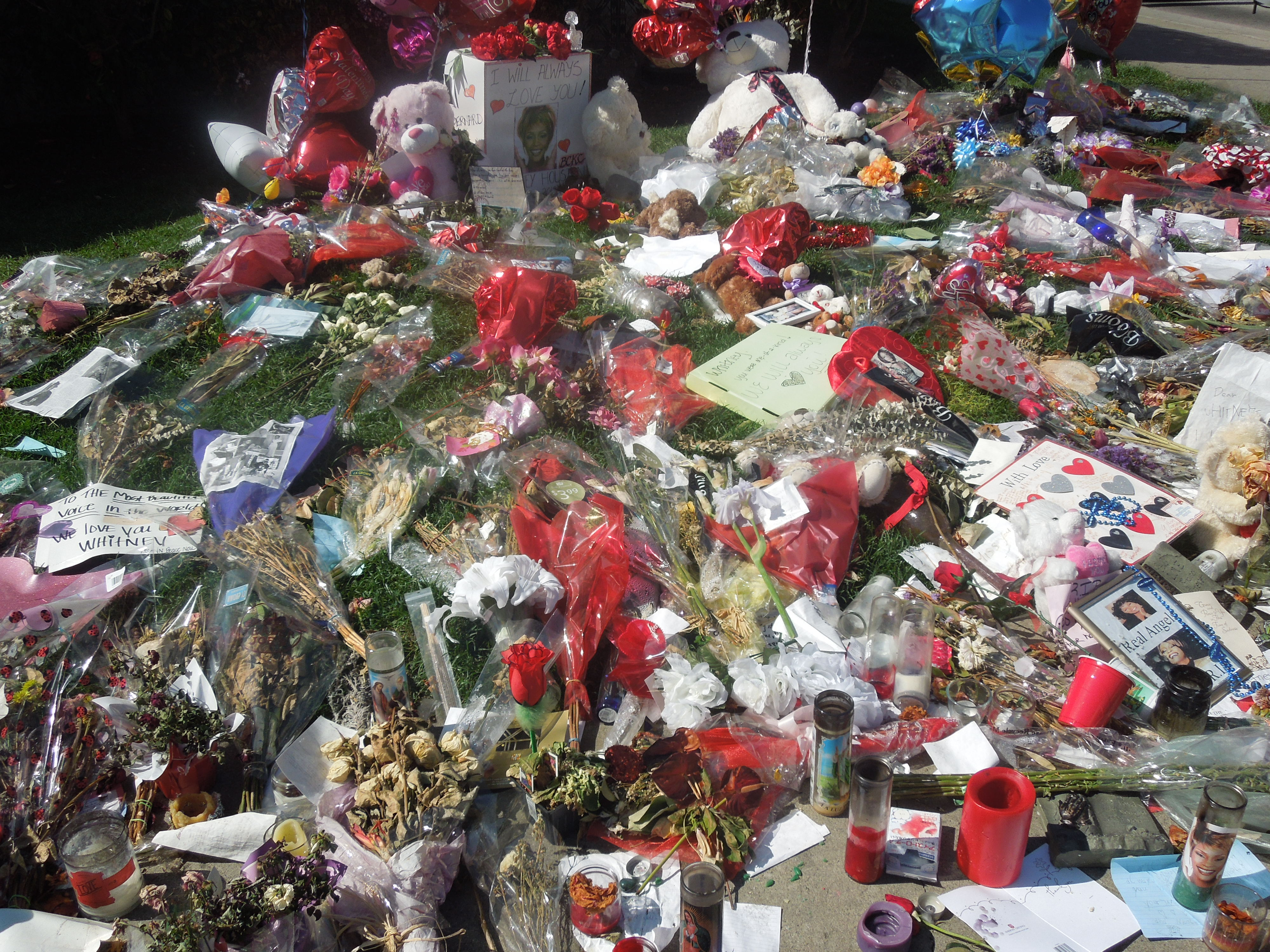
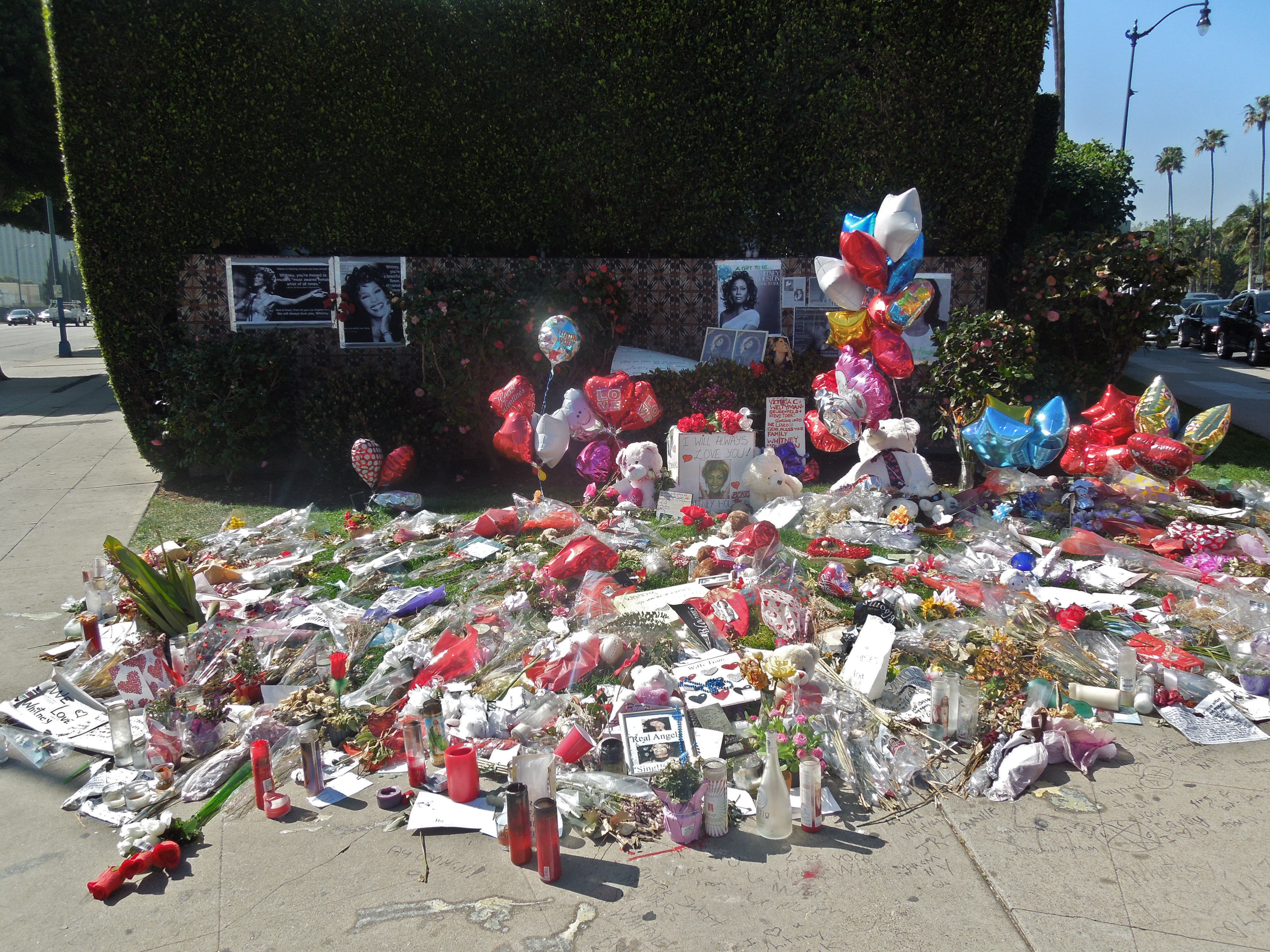
Makeshift vigil for Houston outside the Beverly Hilton hotel following news of her death.

Houston's death triggered an outpouring of grief among the singer's fans and peers in the entertainment industries. Many celebrities responded to Houston's death. Darlene Love, her godmother, said: "It felt like I had been struck by a lightning bolt in my gut." Dolly Parton, whose song "I Will Always Love You" was covered by Houston, said, "I will always be grateful and in awe of the wonderful performance she did on my song and I can truly say from the bottom of my heart, 'Whitney, I will always love you. You will be missed.'" Aretha Franklin said, "It's so stunning and unbelievable." Others, including Mariah Carey, Justin Bieber, Bruno Mars, Katy Perry, Kim Kardashian, Nicki Minaj, Beyonce, Rihanna, Quincy Jones, and Oprah Winfrey, also paid tribute. Her ex-husband, Bobby Brown, was "in and out of crying fits" but did not cancel a scheduled performance, tearfully saying, "I love you, Whitney."

The White House issued a statement, stating that President Obama was "deeply concerned" by the news and that "it's a tragedy to lose somebody so talented at such a young age".

New Jersey Governor Chris Christie ordered all New Jersey state flags to be flown at half-staff on February 18 to honor Houston. Immediately following her death, Christie wrote in his statement: "Whitney Houston was a true New Jersey treasure. Her terribly premature death is an awful loss for her family and the incredible New Jersey musical family. Her soaring talent put her in the pantheon of great New Jersey musical talents like Frank Sinatra, Count Basie and Bruce Springsteen."

In the United Kingdom, several British musicians and industry executives mourned the singer. British soul singer Beverley Knight stated that Houston had a "huge influence on other female artists". Alexandra Burke, who later played the role of Rachel Marron in the musical adaptation of The Bodyguard, called Houston her "hero". Singer Jessie J wrote "Whitney, I sing because of you and will continue to do so in your honour, always and forever." Record producer Pete Waterman said, "She was in a category of her own - she was unique. She took soul and R'n'B to a different level. She brought in the power ballad that a modern generation of singers tries to emulate but they can't because it was difficult and she was unique."

Nelson Mandela, with whom Houston supported during the anti-apartheid movement and performed for at a state dinner at the Rose Garden of the White House in 1994, extended his "deepest condolences" to Houston's family through his official website. South African singer Zonke Dikana paid tribute to Houston, writing "Growing up, I wanted to sing just like Whitney Houston till I found my own voice. She's the reason I'm a singer today ... I'm not sure what musical direction I would have taken had I not obsessed over her voice as a kid."

Houston's death was also mourned by fans in other countries of the African continent. In Nigeria, Princess Anne Inyang screamed when she received the news of Houston's death: "Oh my God! I thought she came out of it. What a great loss!", said Inyang. Prince Mensah of One Ghana, One Voice honored Houston's activism against the apartheid of South Africa in the 1980s, writing, "Whitney Houston was one of the few African-Americans who believed in Africa long before it became fashionable in the United States. She celebrated her identity as a Black person in many ways. As a person born in segregated times, she chose a front seat role in fighting against prejudice. Some people might choose to remember only her struggles, but Africa remembers her as a sister, a queen, a trailblazer and an inspiration. She truly left indelible footprints in our lives." Mensah added Houston's refusal to book modeling and later musical appointments in the region "cemented her status as an icon among Africans, who felt she was one of the few bridges between their continent and the rest of the world." Fans in Rwanda and Kenya also mourned Houston and celebrated her career. In Senegal, radio stations, restaurants and bars paid tribute to Houston.

According to Nadia Bilchik of CNN, a lake in Dubai had "exquisite fountains [playing] to the sound of Whitney Houston." Houston was also mourned and honored in other Arabic countries such as Yemen, Beirut, Turkey and Egypt.

Russian fans of the singer left behind flowers on a fence surrounding the US embassy in Moscow honoring the singer.

In China, Houston was celebrated by the country's popular musicians and producers as well as a long legion of fans for being an "inspirational figure who opened the door to Western pop music" in the country, following the success of Houston's rendition of "I Will Always Love You". Said mogul Song Ke, "she was a queen of the stage. My heart and soul were shocked when I watched her live in concert. We will not find many voices like hers." Song Ke continued, "In this fast-changing world, when a new star pops up every day, it's easy to forget a voice. But for Chinese fans her songs will always be classics. She was far too young to die." Chinese singer-songwriter Xiao Ke said "Take a look at what she did and you'll see she was a born singer. Whitney Houston conquered the world with her voice." Houston's success with "I Will Always Love You" in China came at a time when "the only way for many people to hear about Western pop acts was through limited edition tapes and music magazines," according to China Daily. Other popular Chinese singers and musicians in mainland China, Taiwan and Hong Kong such as Zhang Liangying, Lin Yu-chun and Tanya Tsia all paid tribute to Houston, with Lin in particular speaking of wanting to duet with the singer, dreams of which ended with her death, saying "My dream can never be fulfilled now. My heart is broken." Lin's rendition of "I Will Always Love You" attracted 480,000 views on YouTube.

Fans of the singer in the Philippines, including popular performers such as Lea Salonga, Nikki Gil, Maria Aragon and Zsa Zsa Padilla also mourned and paid tribute to Houston.

Back in the singer's native neighborhood of Newark, New Jersey, fans held a vigil outside New Hope Baptist Church where Houston spent her childhood performing at. On February 12, during a service, American civil rights activist Jesse Jackson spoke at the service at the church. He recalled first meeting Houston as a little girl performing in the church, adding that New Hope had always been "involved in the height" of the civil rights movement. "Traumatized" by the news, Jackson brought up the then-recent death of another prominent black celebrity, Soul Train host Don Cornelius, who died earlier that month, saying "before we could adjust to (Cornelius' death), the news broke last night about Whitney. The two announcements had a devastating impact." A similar vigil was held at the Whitney E. Houston Academy of Creative and Performing Arts in East Orange, New Jersey where flags there flew at half-staff. Back in Beverly Hills outside the Beverly Hilton where Houston died, a growing legion of fans memoralized the singer there partially due to the fact Houston had no star on the Hollywood Walk of Fame. Paul McCartney visited the Beverly Hilton vigil and, along with his wife Nancy Shevell, laid flowers in honor of Houston. At Second Baptist Church in Los Angeles, Al Sharpton told the congregation, "God in his own way decided to give her a voice that rung to the very corners of this Earth, and she sang like nobody sang. There was something about Whitney that would reach in you and make you feel, because she grew up at the knee of a great gospel singer, her mother."

Following news that Houston's body was flown back to her home state of New Jersey, dozens of fans held a candlelight vigil at Newark's Whigham Funeral Home and sang along to Houston's songs, which were played. In Los Angeles, fans held a candlelight vigil at the city's Leimert Park.

In Harlem, outside the Apollo Theater, where Houston filmed her music video to her 1986 hit, "Greatest Love of All", fans of the singer there held a vigil with the theater's marquee honoring her with the words, "In Memory of Whitney Houston: A True Music Icon 1963-2012". Houston was honored at the city's Abyssinian Baptist Church, where she performed in January 1983 with her mother Cissy.

=== Tributes ===
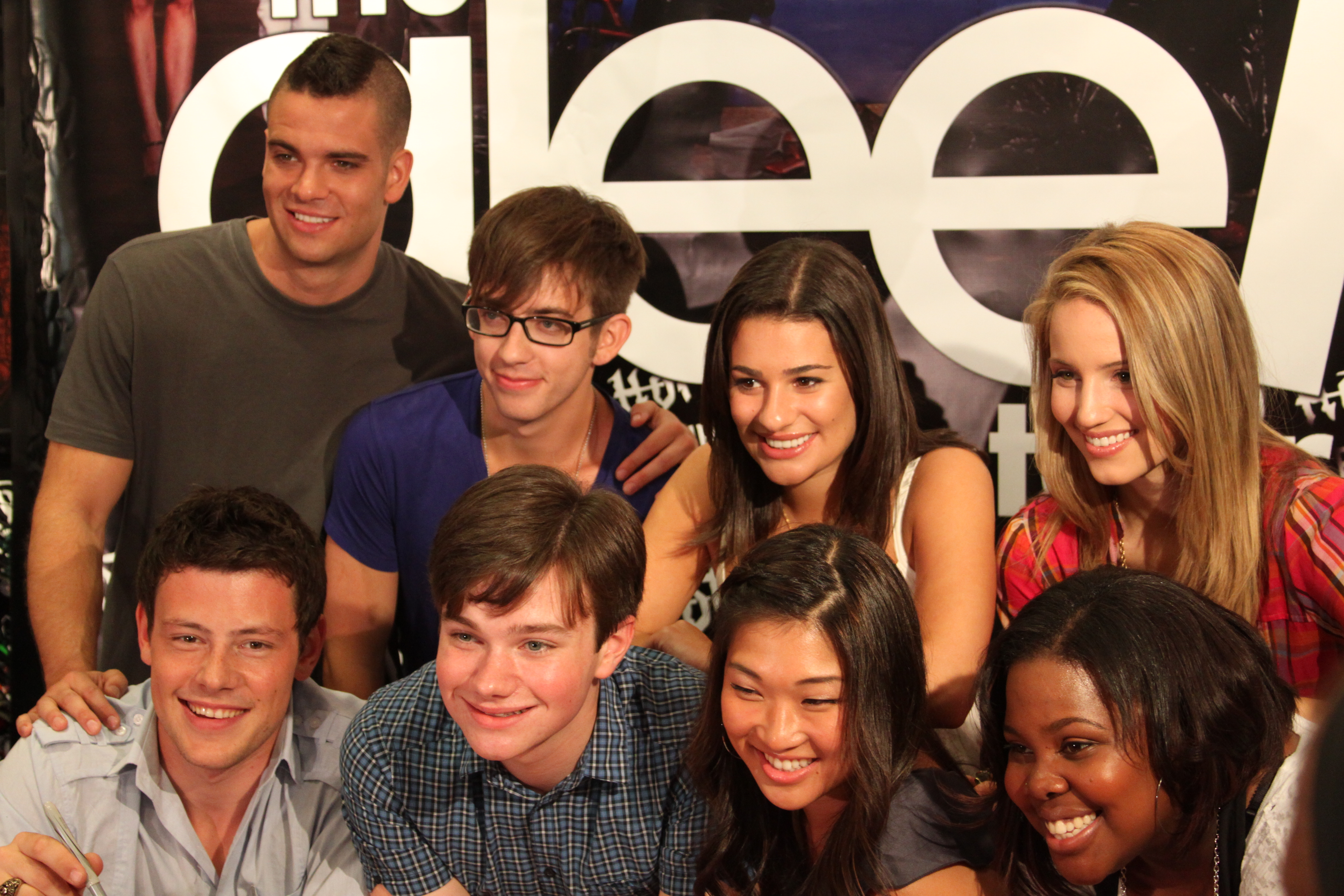
The cast of Glee covered Houston's songs on the episode, "Dance with Somebody", over two months after her death.

At the start of the 54th Grammy Awards on February 12, 2012, a prayer was read by host LL Cool J after footage of Houston performing "I Will Always Love You" at the 1994 Grammys. Jennifer Hudson later performed the song in tribute. During the performance of his song "Runaway Baby" in the same ceremony, Bruno Mars told the audience, "Tonight we're celebrating the beautiful Miss Whitney Houston", cautioning the audience to get on their feet and dance in honor of Houston.

Houston was honored with various tributes at the 43rd NAACP Image Awards on February 17. An image montage of Houston and important black figures who died in 2011 was followed by video footage from the 1994 ceremony, where Houston won five awards, including Entertainer of the Year. Yolanda Adams performed "I Love the Lord" from The Preacher's Wife Soundtrack, and Kirk Franklin and the Family started their performance with "Greatest Love of All".

The 2012 Brit Awards on February 21 paid tribute to Houston by playing a 30-second video montage with "One Moment in Time" as the background music. Houston was featured in the In Memoriam montage at the 84th Academy Awards on February 26, 2012.

During his February 11 show at Caesars Palace in Las Vegas, Elton John dedicated his 1974 hit "Don't Let the Sun Go Down on Me" to Houston, telling the audience prior: "This is a sad day today, all I want to talk about is her music. She was the most beautiful woman I think I ever saw…. Thank you for giving us your talent, and one of the most beautiful voices I've ever heard."

In June 2012, the year's McDonald's Gospelfest in Newark was dedicated as a tribute to Houston. Beyoncé performed a tribute to Houston during her revue Revel Presents: Beyoncé Live in May 2012 at the Revel resort by performing the first verse and chorus of "I Will Always Love You".

At the 2012 Billboard Music Awards, Jordin Sparks sang "I Will Always Love You" while John Legend performed "Greatest Love of All" as Houston posthumously received the Billboard Millennium Award.

Just days after Houston's death, Glee actress and singer Amber Riley gave what critics called a "powerful performance" of "I Will Always Love You" on the Glee episode, "Heart". At the end of the episode, the screen faded to black and then showcased the words "Whitney Houston, 1963-2012, We Will Always Love You." A couple months later, Glee aired the episode, "Dance with Somebody", which was a special tribute episode to Houston with the cast of the show performing seven of her songs.

At that year's BET Awards, Houston was honored by Mariah Carey, who gave a tearful and emotional speech recalling Houston's friendship and the influence Houston left on her music, while mother Cissy Houston, elder half-brother Gary Garland, and recording artists Brandy, Monica and Chaka Khan all honored her with mostly renditions of Houston's hits. Cissy Houston gave an emotional performance of "Bridge Over Troubled Water" while Garland performed the album track from Houston's sophomore album, Whitney, "Where You Are". Monica sang Houston's rendition of "I Love the Lord" from The Preacher's Wife soundtrack, followed by Brandy singing "I'm Your Baby Tonight" and "I Wanna Dance with Somebody (Who Loves Me)" and Chaka Khan performing "I'm Every Woman", which Houston turned into an international hit in 1993. Houston had made history during the first BET Awards in 2001 where she became the first recipient of their Lifetime Achievement Award.

On November 16, 2012, CBS aired a one-hour television special hosted by the Recording Academy titled, We Will Always Love You: A GRAMMY Salute to Whitney Houston. The show featured commentary and presentation from actress Halle Berry, pop star Britney Spears, actress Taraji P. Henson and rap artist LL Cool J, who hosted the Grammys the night after Houston's death, as well as tribute performances by Usher, Celine Dion, Jennifer Hudson, CeCe Winans and Yolanda Adams. In December, Houston was also given a tribute on the 2012 Divas Live program, a show Houston had been a constant presence on, going back to 1999, singing Houston classics such as "I'm Every Woman", "I Wanna Dance with Somebody (Who Loves Me)" and "How Will I Know", which were respectively sung by Jordin Sparks, Melanie Fiona and Ledisi.

A year after her death, in 2013, English musician James Blunt dedicated his song "Miss America" on his album, Moon Landing, to Houston.

=== Record sales ===
According to representatives from Houston's record label, Houston sold 8 million records worldwide in the first 10 months of the year she died. With just 24 hours passing between news of Houston's death and Nielsen SoundScan tabulating the weekly album charts, Whitney: The Greatest Hits climbed into the Top 10 with 64,000 copies sold; it was a 10,419 percent gain compared to the previous week. 43 of the top 100 most-downloaded tracks on iTunes were Houston songs, including "I Will Always Love You" from The Bodyguard at number one. Two other Houston classics, "I Wanna Dance With Somebody (Who Loves Me)" and "Greatest Love of All", were in the top 10. As fans of Houston rushed to rediscover the singer's music, single digital track sales of the artist's music rose to more than 887,000 paid song downloads in 24 hours in the US alone.

The single "I Will Always Love You" returned to the Billboard Hot 100 after almost 20 years, peaking at number three and becoming a posthumous top-10 single for Houston, the first one since 2001. Two other Houston songs also jumped back on the Hot 100: "I Wanna Dance With Somebody (Who Loves Me)" at 25 and "Greatest Love of All" at 36. Her death on February 11 ignited an incredible drive to her YouTube and Vevo pages. She went from 868,000 views in the week prior to her death to 40,200,000 views in the week following her death, a 45-fold increase.

On February 29, 2012, Houston became the first female artist and first posthumous artist in history ever to place three or more albums in the top 10 of the US Billboard 200 simultaneously, with Whitney: The Greatest Hits at number two, The Bodyguard at number six and Whitney Houston at number nine. On March 7, 2012, Houston claimed two more additional feats on the US Billboard charts: she became the first female act to place nine albums within the top 100 (with Whitney: The Greatest Hits at number two, The Bodyguard at number five, Whitney Houston at number 10, I Look to You at number 13, Triple Feature at number 21, My Love Is Your Love at number 31, I'm Your Baby Tonight at number 32, Just Whitney at number 50 and The Preacher's Wife at number 80); in addition, other Houston albums were also on the US Billboard Top 200 Album Chart at this time. Houston also became the second female act, after Adele, to place two albums in the top five of the US Billboard Top 200, with Whitney: The Greatest Hits at number 2 and The Bodyguard at number 5. In addition, Houston set a Guinness World Record by being the first female artist to place the most albums inside the Billboard 200 simultaneously by a female artist with ten. In October 2023, Houston made the list of the top 10 highest-earning posthumous celebrities on Forbes earning $30 million, later winning Houston a posthumous Guinness World Records entry as the highest-earning posthumous female celebrity, her record 33rd.

In the United Kingdom, her 2000 compilation, Whitney: The Greatest Hits, re-entered the UK Albums Chart at number 7 for the week ending February 25, 2012, while another compilation, The Essential, entered the chart for the first time at number 40 in the same week. The Essential shot up the charts, peaking at number 7 on the albums chart for the week ending March 10, 2012. For the week ending February 25, thirteen of Houston's singles re-entered the top 100 of the UK Singles Chart, with twelve peaking inside the top 75. With this achievement, Houston broke a chart record for a female artist, first set by Amy Winehouse, who charted 11 singles inside the top 75, earning a posthumous Guinness World Record.

In Australia, three of her compilation albums — The Ultimate Collection, Whitney: The Greatest Hits and The Essential — reached the top 20 of the ARIA Albums Chart, with The Greatest Hits and The Ultimate Collection re-peaking at numbers three and seven respectively. During that same week, her hits "I Will Always Love You", "I Wanna Dance with Somebody (Who Loves Me)" and "I Have Nothing" re-entered the ARIA Singles Chart at numbers 8, 25 and 47.

== Memorial service ==
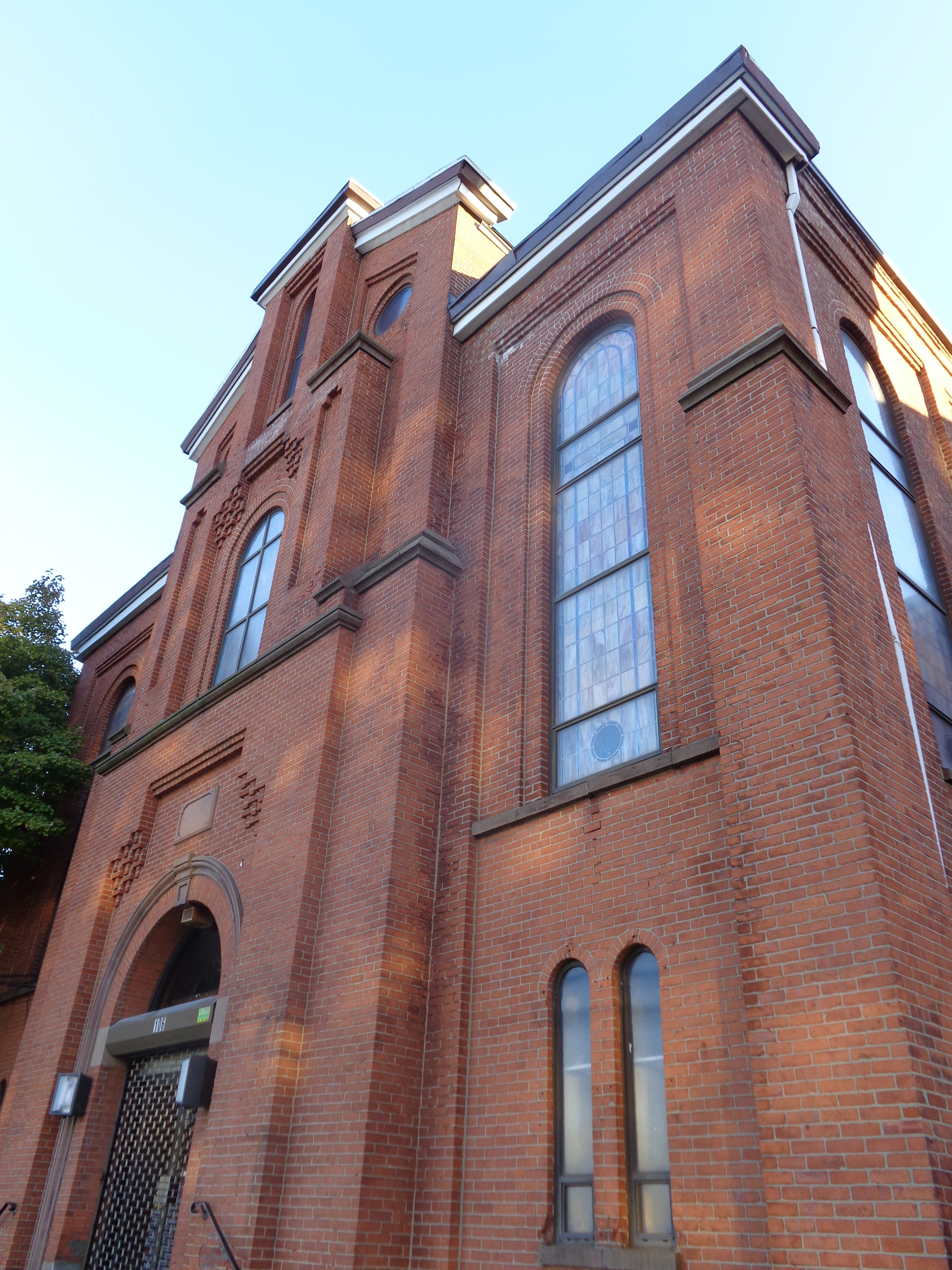
New Hope Baptist Church, where Houston's memorial service was held.

An invitation-only memorial service was held for Houston at her home church, New Hope Baptist Church, in Newark, New Jersey, on February 18, 2012. The service was scheduled for two hours but lasted four. The funeral was televised globally. The star-studded service included celebrities such as Oprah Winfrey, Angela Bassett, Roberta Flack, Elton John, Bill Cosby, Denzel Washington, Jay-Z, Beyoncé, Brandy, Monica and Mariah Carey.

Among those who performed at the funeral were Stevie Wonder (rewritten version of "Ribbon in the Sky" and "Love's in Need of Love Today"), BeBe Winans ("I Really Miss You"), CeCe Winans ("Don't Cry" and "Jesus Loves Me"), Alicia Keys ("Send Me an Angel"), Kim Burrell (rewritten version of "A Change Is Gonna Come"), Donnie McClurkin ("Stand") and R. Kelly ("I Look to You").

The performances were interspersed with hymns by the church choir and remarks by Clive Davis, Houston's record producer; Kevin Costner, who co-starred with the singer in the movie The Bodyguard; Rickey Minor, her music director; Dionne Warwick, her cousin; Tyler Perry, a personal friend whose jet plane helped to bring Houston's body back to New Jersey; and Ray Watson, her security guard for the last 11 years. Aretha Franklin was listed on the program, and was expected to sing, but was unable to attend the service. Bobby Brown departed shortly after the service began.

Much like the memorial service of fellow pop star Michael Jackson, Houston's televised funeral drew in millions. It was reported by Adweek that Houston's funeral was viewed by over nine million viewers across all cable news networks in the US alone. Because Saturday viewerships are "usually slow", Houston's funeral set records for Saturday cable TV viewership.

According to CNN stats, the funeral was watched by over 5.4 million viewers on the channel. 1.42 and 1.38 million viewers respectively watched the proceedings on HLN and Fox News, while over 709,000 viewers watched on MSNBC.

The funeral was also streamed on the Associated Press, which reported that the live stream accumulated 7.3 million streams and had two million unique visitors during the funeral, surpassing the all-time AP Live streams from the British royal wedding of Prince William and Kate Middleton.

Houston was buried on February 19, 2012, in Fairview Cemetery, in Westfield, New Jersey, next to her father, John Russell Houston Jr., who had died in 2003.

== Posthumous releases ==
Houston's first posthumous greatest hits album, I Will Always Love You: The Best of Whitney Houston, was released on November 13, 2012, by RCA Records. It features the remastered versions of her number-one hits, an unreleased song titled "Never Give Up" and a duet version of "I Look to You" with R. Kelly. The album won two NAACP Image Awards for 'Outstanding Album' and 'Outstanding Song' ("I Look to You"). It was certified Gold by the RIAA in 2020. In October 2021, the album was reissued on vinyl and included Houston's first posthumous hit, "Higher Love". Since its release, it has spent more than 200 weeks on the Billboard 200, making it one of the longest-charting compilations in chart history, and the longest by a female artist. On the week of May 27, 2023, it replaced Madonna's The Immaculate Collection as the longest charting greatest hits album by a woman in the history of the Billboard 200 after it notched 149 weeks on the chart.

Houston's posthumous live album, Her Greatest Performances (2014), was a US R&B number-one and received positive reviews by music critics. In 2017, the 25th anniversary reissue of The Bodyguard (soundtrack)—I Wish You Love: More from The Bodyguard—was released by Legacy Recordings. It includes film versions, remixes and live performances of Houston's Bodyguard songs.

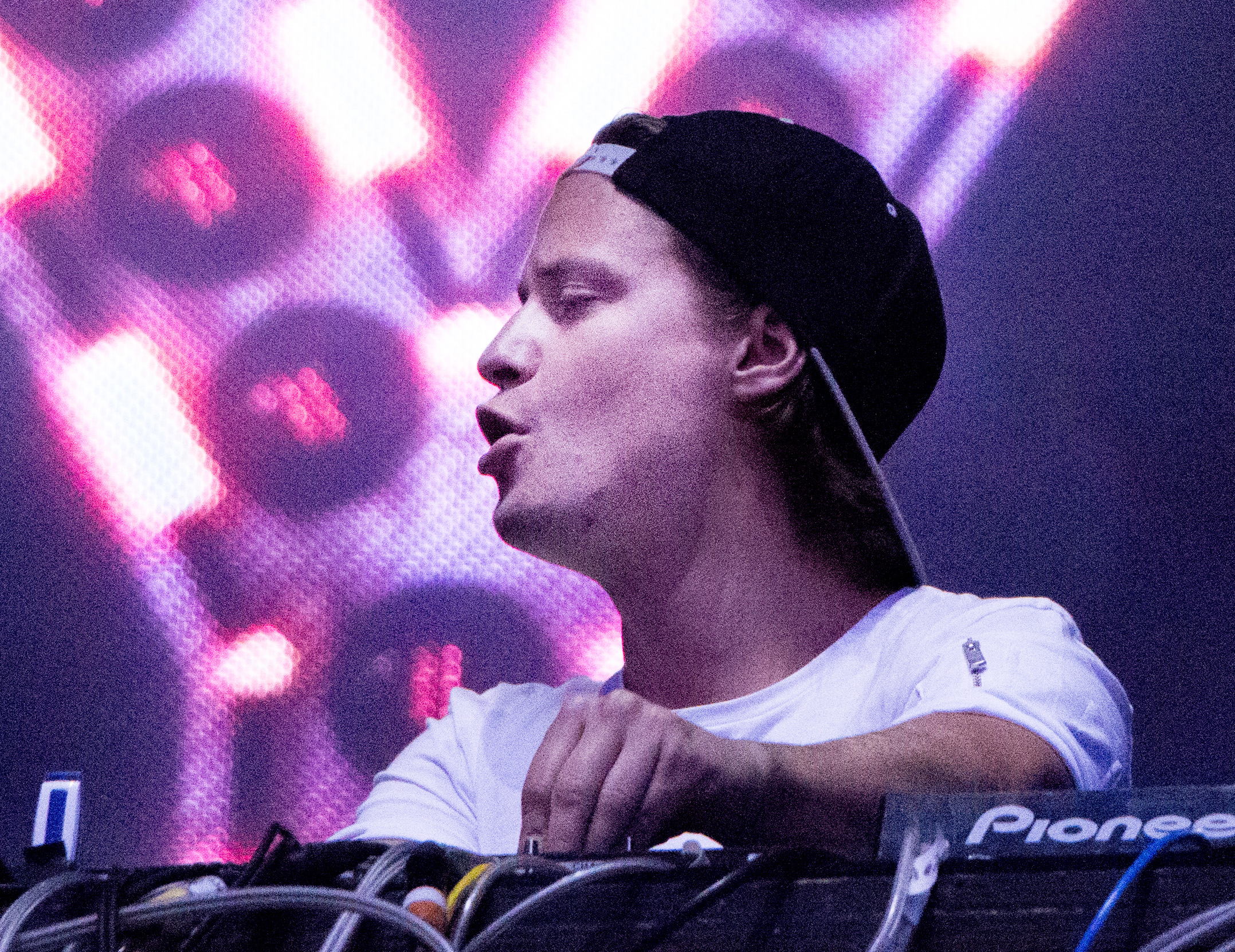
A 2019 remake of "Higher Love" by Norwegian DJ Kygo, featuring Houston's vocals, reached the top 10 in several countries, including number-two on the UK Singles Chart.

In 2019, Houston and Kygo's version of "Higher Love" was released as a single. It reached number two on the UK Singles Chart and reached the top 10 in several countries. In the US, it became Houston's fourteenth number one hit on the Hot Dance Club Songs chart and became her 40th hit on the Billboard Hot 100. "Higher Love" was nominated at the 2020 Billboard Music Awards for "Top Dance/Electronic Song of the Year", the 2020 iHeartRadio Music Awards for "Dance Song of the Year" and "Best Remix". It was certified multi-platinum in the United States, Australia, Canada, Poland and the United Kingdom. The song was also a platinum hit in Denmark, Switzerland, Belgium, and Spain.

On December 16, 2022, RCA released the soundtrack album to Houston's featured film biopic, titled, I Wanna Dance with Somebody (The Movie: Whitney New, Classic and Reimagined), to every digital download platform all over the world. The soundtrack includes reimagined remixes of some of Houston's classics and several newly discovered songs such as Houston's cover of CeCe Winans' "Don't Cry" (labeled as "Don't Cry for Me" on Houston's soundtrack) at the Commitment to Life AIDS benefit concert in Los Angeles in January 1994, remixed by house producer Sam Feldt.

In March 2023, Arista, Legacy Recordings and Gaither Music Group released Houston's first gospel compilation, I Go to the Rock: The Gospel Music of Whitney Houston. The album included three 1981 demo recordings recorded when Houston was 17, including "Testimony" and "He Can Use Me", while also featuring unearthed live recordings of Houston performing the gospel standards, "This Day", "He/I Believe" and, with CeCe Winans, an inspired rendition of "Bridge Over Troubled Water", recorded live at the second annual VH1 Honors in 1995 as well as previous recordings from The Bodyguard, The Preacher's Wife, and Sparkle. The album debuted at number two on Billboard's Top Gospel Albums chart, marking her first new entry on the chart since 1996. The album earned Houston a posthumous Billboard Music Award nomination for Top Gospel Album. On October 23 and 27, 2024, a film of Houston's then-unseen performance at Durban's Kings Park Stadium from November 1994 was shown at more than 900 international theaters, then followed by a live album released on November 8, to commemorate Houston's 30th anniversary of her landmark performances at South Africa after Nelson Mandela's historic presidential election win.

On March 14, 2025, a remake of "It's Not Right but It's Okay" by German DJ and producer Felix Jaehn was released on Arista Records, marking the 25th anniversary of the original song's release. The remix became a hit in Israel, Estonia, Croatia and the Czech Republic. In the latter chart, it topped the major radio chart there, giving Houston a posthumous number one single in the country, her first chart-topper there. In September 2025, Calum Scott released a reimagined duet ballad rendition of "I Wanna Dance with Somebody (Who Loves Me)" with Houston, which is featured on his album, Avenoir. In August 2026, a couple of days before what was supposed to be her 63rd birthday, Arista released the number ones compilation album, WH1TNEY, which made the Billboard charts. Two days later, on her actual birthday, Mattel unveiled its official Barbie doll of Houston replicating her look from her famed 1987 music video of "I Wanna Dance with Somebody (Who Loves Me)".
