= Whitney: The Concert for a New South Africa =

Concerts by Whitney Houston

Whitney – The Concert for a New South Africa
- Concert by Whitney Houston
- Venue: Kings Park Stadium; Ellis Park Stadium; Green Point Stadium
- Tour: The Bodyguard World Tour
- Dates: November 8, 1994; November 12, 1994; November 19, 1994
- No. of shows: 3
- Attendance: over 200,000

Whitney – The Concert for a New South Africa (alternately titled Whitney Houston – Live in South Africa, Whitney Houston – Concert for South Africa) was the title of three concerts which American singer Whitney Houston performed in South Africa to honor President Nelson Mandela in November 1994.

== History ==
Houston's first ever performances in South Africa were at Kings Park Stadium in Durban on November 8th, Ellis Park Stadium in Johannesburg on November 12th, and at Green Point Stadium in Cape Town on November 19th. These would make her the first major musician to visit the newly unified, post-apartheid nation following Mandela's winning election. The concert from Johannesburg was released on VHS in December 1994. All proceeds from the event were donated to South African charities, including two children's museums, the President's Trust Fund, the Kagiso Foundation, and several orphanages. On September 13, 2024, the first concert in Durban was announced to arrive in theaters on October 23 and 27, 2024, and a live album titled The Concert for a New South Africa (Durban) was released on November 8, 2024 – exactly 30 years from the date of the first concert.

== Set list ==
=== Kings Park Stadium, Durban (November 8, 1994) ===
1. "Love's in Need of Love Today"
2. "So Emotional"
3. "Love Will Save the Day"
4. "Saving All My Love for You"
5. "I Wanna Dance with Somebody (Who Loves Me)"
6. "How Will I Know"
7. Medley: "I Love You" / "All at Once" / "Where You Are"
8. "Lover for Life"
9. "Queen of the Night"
10. "I Have Nothing"
11. "Touch the World" (Earth, Wind & Fire cover, performed with Cissy Houston and Tu Nokwe's Amajika Performing Arts choir)
12. "Love Is"
13. "Jesus Loves Me"
14. "Amazing Grace"
15. "Master Blaster (Jammin')"
16. "I Will Always Love You"
17. "I'm Every Woman"
18. "Greatest Love of All"
19. "Home"
20. "I'm Every Woman (Reprise)"

=== Ellis Park Stadium, Johannesburg (November 12, 1994) ===
1. "Love's in Need of Love"
2. "So Emotional"
3. "Saving All My Love for You"
4. "I Wanna Dance with Somebody (Who Loves Me)"
5. "How Will I Know"
6. Medley: "I Love You" / "All at Once" / "Where You Are"
7. "Lover for Life"
8. "My Name Is Not Susan"
9. "Queen of the Night"
10. "I Have Nothing"
11. "Touch the World"
12. "Love Is"
13. "Amazing Grace"
14. "Master Blaster (Jammin')"
15. "I Will Always Love You"
16. "I'm Every Woman"
17. "Greatest Love of All"
18. "Home"
19. "I'm Every Woman (Reprise)"

=== Green Point Stadium, Cape Town (November 19, 1994) ===
1. "Love's in Need of Love"
2. "So Emotional"
3. "Saving All My Love for You"
4. "I Wanna Dance with Somebody (Who Loves Me)"
5. "How Will I Know"
6. Medley: "I Love You" / "All at Once" / "Nobody Loves Me Like You Do" / "Where Do Broken Hearts Go" / "Where You Are"
7. "Lover for Life"
8. "All the Man That I Need"
9. "My Name Is Not Susan"
10. "Queen of the Night"
11. "I Have Nothing"
12. "Touch the World"
13. "Love Is"
14. "Amazing Grace"
15. "Wonderful Counselor"
16. "Master Blaster (Jammin')"
17. "I Will Always Love You"
18. "I'm Every Woman"
19. "Greatest Love of All"
20. "Home"
21. "I'm Every Woman (Reprise)"

==== Notes ====
- The South Africa tour included "Where You Are" and "Lover for Life", as well as "Touch the World" (a cover of an Earth, Wind & Fire piece), never performed by Houston during any of her past tours.
- The November 19 show was altered, with "Nobody Loves Me Like You Do" and "Where Do Broken Hearts Go" not performed in medley. "All the Man That I Need" and "Wonderful Counselor" were also removed.
- Audio of "So Emotional" from the concert in Durban appear in the film Whitney Houston: I Wanna Dance with Somebody
- On September 14, 2024, it was announced that the Durban concert would be released in theaters on October 23 and 27, 2024.
- During the concert in Cape Town, Whitney sported a red version of her jacket and bodysuit, as opposed to the purple version worn during the Durban and Johannesburg shows, seen here.

== Personnel ==
- Musical Director: Rickey Minor
- Bass guitar/Bass synthesizer: Rickey Minor
- Guitars: Paul Jackson, Jr.
- Keyboards: Bette Sussman, Wayne Linsey, Joe Wolfe
- Drums: Michael Baker
- Percussions: Bashiri Johnson
- Saxophones/EWI: Kirk Whalum, Gary Bias
- Trumpet: Michael "Patches" Stewart, Oscar Brashear
- Trombone: George Bohanon
- Background Vocalists: Olivia McClurkin, Alfie Silas, Pattie Howard
- Dancers: Carolyn Brown, Merlyn Mitchell, Shane Johnson, Saleema Mubaarak
- Little Girl Dancers: Fajallah Harper, Vanitey Ramdhan, Sylvia Enriquez, Mistey Ramdhan
