= The Concert for a New South Africa (Durban) =

Live album by Whitney Houston
- Released: November 8, 2024
- Recorded: November 8, 1994
- Venues: Kings Park Stadium (Durban, South Africa)
- Length: 122:56
- Label: Legacy
- Producers: Marty Callner; Whitney Houston; Nat Adderley Jr.; Carvin Winans; Tommy Sims

Whitney Houston chronology
I Go to the Rock: The Gospel Music of Whitney Houston (2023)	The Concert for a New South Africa (Durban) (2024)	WH1TNEY (2026)

The Concert for a New South Africa (Durban) is a posthumous live album by the American singer Whitney Houston, released by Legacy Recordings on November 8, 2024, to commemorate the 30th anniversary of Whitney: The Concert for a New South Africa, when Houston was the first Western artist to perform in South Africa after apartheid was abolished.

The album features a studio recording of "Love Is", a ballad written exclusively for Houston by Carvin Winans. The ballad is from a 1990 recording session produced by Houston and Nat Adderley Jr. The album also includes a remixed version of the song by Winans. Upon its release, the song became a hit on several UK singles charts.

The album was Houston's second posthumous live release, following Whitney Houston Live: Her Greatest Performances (2014)

== Background ==
In 1964, British singer Dusty Springfield was booked to perform several shows in South Africa but once Springfield found that black and white audiences were set to watch her shows in segregated venues, Springfield boycotted the shows, becoming one of the first Western pop musicians and celebrities to do so; she was deported as a result.

Many artists declared not to perform in South Africa or have their works shown there because of the government's rigid adherence to apartheid with some exceptions, including singers such as Frank Sinatra, Ray Charles, Tina Turner, the O'Jays, the Jacksons, Stephanie Mills and Millie Jackson.

In 1975, American soul-jazz singer and poet Gil Scott-Heron and frequent collaborator, Brian Jackson recorded the protest song, "Johannesburg". The song became popular among black audiences upon its release in November of the year, sending it to the top 30 of the Billboard Hot Soul Singles chart. In 1980, British rock singer Peter Gabriel recorded the song "Biko" in tribute to South African civil rights activist Steve Biko.

In 1983, singer Harry Belafonte and tennis player Arthur Ashe founded Artists and Athletes Against Apartheid to lobby for sanctions and embargoes against the South African government. The group consisted of more than sixty U.S. artists and athletes, including Tony Bennett, Bill Cosby, and Muhammad Ali, who refused to perform in South Africa until the apartheid was dismantled. Any artist or celebrity who had performed at South African venues before the boycott or afterwards were either lambasted or blacklisted.

In 1985, Steven Van Zandt and Arthur Baker also founded the protest group Artists United Against Apartheid and produced the record Sun City to voice concerns for apartheid and the imprisonment of Nelson Mandela. Proceeds from the album were donated to The Africa Fund to support humanitarian efforts of anti-apartheid groups.

Houston also supported the anti-apartheid movement during this era and joined the boycott refusing both modeling opportunities and music engagements in the country, despite becoming one of the country's most popular artists with her 1987 hit, "I Wanna Dance with Somebody (Who Loves Me)", topping the charts there.

On June 11, 1988, during her Moment of Truth World Tour, Houston interrupted the tour to take part in the Nelson Mandela 70th Birthday Tribute concert to support then-imprisoned South African civil rights activist Nelson Mandela, which took place at London's Wembley Stadium and was broadcast worldwide, watched by over 600 million viewers. The event raised $1 million and was said to have raised further awareness of the issue of apartheid and led to growing demands to free imprisoned South African activists, including Mandela.

Twenty months after the concert, on February 11, 1990, Mandela was paroled after spending 27 years in prison. In March 1994, apartheid was abolished in the country, which was subsequently followed by Mandela winning the South African presidential election, making Mandela the first black President of the country.

In September 1994, during Houston's Radio City Music Hall residency in the middle of her tour to support her hit soundtrack to The Bodyguard, it was announced that Houston would headline three shows in South Africa that November, which made her the first artist to headline a solo concert tour there following the end of apartheid. On October 4, 1994, Houston gave a performance at the White House during a state dinner for Mandela at the Rose Garden, which aired on the political channel C-SPAN.

== Performance and content ==
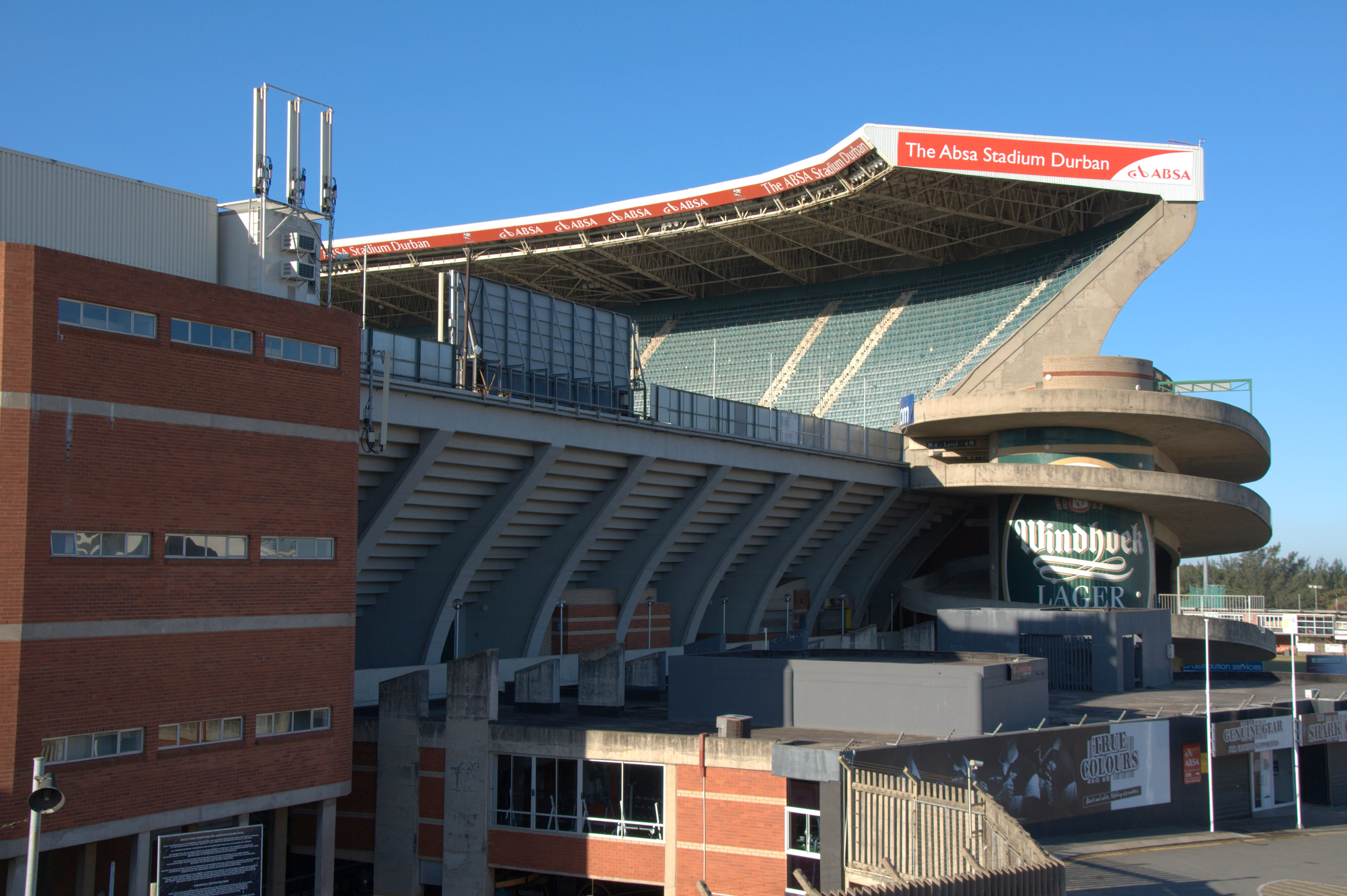
Durban's Kings Park Stadium was the first stop of the South African leg.

Houston arrived to Pretoria in early November 1994 where she was greeted by a mob of South African fans. During her visit in Pretoria, she met up with Mandela at the Union Buildings. While in Johannesburg on November 4, Houston was serenaded in song by a children's choir and subsequently announced that she would donate all concert proceeds from the three shows to several children's charities including two children's museums, the President's Trust Fund (for President Mandela), the Kasigo Trust and several orphanages.

During her preparation for the South African concert dates, Houston had decided on having one of the shows, at Ellis Park Stadium in Johannesburg, be taped live on HBO. It was decided by Houston and Marty Callner that the November 8 show at Durban's Kings Park Stadium to be taped as a test run for the Johannesburg show.

Houston decided to alter the set list that she used throughout the tour. She arrived onstage at Kings Park Stadium to Stevie Wonder's "Love's in Need of Love Today" from Wonder's acclaimed 1976 album, Songs in the Key of Life, which she also sang during the Rose Garden performance. Later on in the show, Houston covered another song by Wonder, the 1980 hit "Master Blaster (Jammin')" from the artist's Hotter than July album.

Houston would cover album tracks from her catalog, including "Lover for Life" from I'm Your Baby Tonight and "Where You Are" from Whitney, while also covering her long string of hits including five of her six recordings from The Bodyguard as well as older hits such as "Saving All My Love for You", "All at Once", "How Will I Know", "Greatest Love of All" and "I Wanna Dance with Somebody (Who Loves Me)".

Houston included the inspirational songs such as Earth, Wind and Fire's "Touch the World", from the band's 1987 album of the same name. The performance featured a choir led by Houston's mother, singer and longtime choir director Cissy and also featured leads from Houston's own background singers as well. Another inspirational song she recorded in 1990 and written for her by Carvin Winans called "Love Is" was performed soon after "Touch the World".

During the gospel portion of the show, Houston performed her Bodyguard hit, "Jesus Loves Me", along with "Amazing Grace", in which she participated in an impromptu duet with her saxophonist Kirk Whalum, who performed the song with his sax solo to the delight of the audience and of Houston.

During her second and final encore of the concert, Houston covered "Home", which marked the first time she performed the song since her national television debut on The Merv Griffin Show in June 1983.

The entire show was produced by Houston, Rickey Minor and Callner.

== Chart performance ==
The album made several chart appearances in the United Kingdom, peaking at number 16 on OCC Albums Downloads chart, number 56 on its Albums Sales chart and number 77 on its Physical Sales chart. The album appeared on the official album charts in Belgium, France and Portugal.

The sole studio version of "Love Is", which was mostly played in the United Kingdom, also made the charts in the UK, peaking at number 21 on the OCC Vinyl Singles chart and number 25 on the OCC Physical Singles chart, for the week of December 12, 2024.

== Track listing ==
The Concert for a New South Africa (Durban) track listing – vinyl edition
No.	Title	Writer(s)	Length
1.	"Love's in Need of Love Today"	Stevie Wonder	3:37
2.	"So Emotional"	Billy Steinberg; Tom Kelly	4:01
3.	"Love Will Save the Day"	Toni C.	6:16
4.	"Saving All My Love for You"	Michael Masser; Gerry Goffin	7:13
5.	"I Wanna Dance with Somebody (Who Loves Me)"	George Merrill; Shannon Rubicam	5:20
6.	"How Will I Know"	Merrill; Rubicam; Narada Michael Walden	4:03
7.	"I Love You/All at Once/Where You Are" (Love Medley)	Whitney Houston; Rickey Minor; Masser; Jeffrey Osborne; LeMel Humes; James Calabrese; Dyan Humes	7:38
8.	"Queen of the Night"	Houston; L.A. Reid; Kenneth "Babyface" Edmonds; Daryl Simmons	3:44
9.	"I Have Nothing"	David Foster; Linda Thompson	6:06
10.	"Love Is"	Carvin Winans	6:45
11.	"I Will Always Love You"	Dolly Parton	10:25
12.	"I'm Every Woman"	Nickolas Ashford; Valerie Simpson	6:43
13.	"Greatest Love of All"	Masser; Linda Creed	4:41
Total length:			76:32

The Concert for a New South Africa (Durban) track listing – CD edition
No.	Title	Writer(s)	Length
14.	"Love Is" (Studio Version)	Winans	3:37
Total length:			79:49

The Concert for a New South Africa (Durban) track listing – digital edition
No.	Title	Writer(s)	Length
1.	"Love's in Need of Love Today"	Wonder	3:38
2.	"So Emotional"	Steinberg; Kelly	4:02
3.	"Love Will Save the Day"	Toni C.	6:17
4.	"Saving All My Love for You"	Masser; Goffin	7:14
5.	"I Wanna Dance with Somebody (Who Loves Me)"	Merrill; Rubicam	5:21
6.	"How Will I Know"	Merrill; Rubicam; Walden	4:04
7.	"I Love You" (Love Medley)	Houston; Minor	3:14
8.	"All at Once" (Love Medley)	Masser; Osborne	1:51
9.	"Where You Are" (Love Medley)	LeMel Humes; Calabrese; Dyan Humes	2:31
10.	"Lover for Life"	Sam Dees	5:13
11.	"Queen of the Night"	Houston; L.A. Reid; Babyface; Simmons	3:45
12.	"I Have Nothing"	Foster; Thompson	6:14
13.	"Touch the World"	Reverend Oliver Wells	6:01
14.	"Love Is"	Winans	6:46
15.	"Jesus Loves Me"	Anna Bartlett Warner; William Batchelder Bradbury	9:17
16.	"Amazing Grace"	John Newton	5:26
17.	"Master Blaster (Jammin')"	Wonder	8:58
18.	"I Will Always Love You"	Parton	10:24
19.	"I'm Every Woman" (Intro)		1:43
20.	"I'm Every Woman"	Ashford; Simpson	5:02
21.	"Greatest Love of All"	Masser; Creed	4:46
22.	"Home"	Charlie Smalls	5:17
23.	"Love Is" (2024 Mix)	Winans	3:18
24.	"Love Is" (Carvin Winans Remix)	Winans; Chérie Winans	2:58
Total length:			122:56

== Charts ==
Chart performance for The Concert for a New South Africa (Durban)
Chart (2024)	Peak position
Belgian Albums (Ultratop Wallonia)	173
French Albums (SNEP)	184
Portuguese Albums (AFP)	165
UK Album Downloads (Official Charts)	16

== See also ==
- Whitney: The Concert for a New South Africa
