= I Go to the Rock: The Gospel Music of Whitney Houston =

Compilation album by Whitney Houston
- Released: March 24, 2023
- Recorded: 1981–2012
- Genre: Gospel
- Length: 61:42
- Label: Arista; Legacy; Gaither Music Group

Whitney Houston chronology
Japanese Singles Collection -Greatest Hits- (2022)	I Go to the Rock: The Gospel Music of Whitney Houston (2023)	The Concert for a New South Africa (Durban) (2024)

Singles from I Go to the Rock: The Gospel Music of Whitney Houston
- 1. "Testimony" Released: February 9, 2023; 2. "He Can Use Me" Released: February 23, 2023

I Go to the Rock: The Gospel Music of Whitney Houston is a posthumous gospel compilation album by American recording artist Whitney Houston, released on March 24, 2023 by Arista Records, Legacy Recordings, and Gaither Music Group. The album features 14 tracks, including six never-before-released songs, three of which culled from a 1981 recording session when Houston was just seventeen.

== Background ==
In February 2023, according to Billboard, a new documentary and posthumous album would explore the singer's lifelong connection to gospel music. The album I Go to the Rock: The Gospel Music of Whitney Houston, would feature previously unreleased tracks, including the upcoming first single "Testimony", issued before the full album to be released later in the year. The compilation album celebrates Houston's deep roots in gospel music and showcases her talent, faith and passion for the genre. Included are renditions of classics "Jesus Loves Me", "I Love the Lord" and "His Eye Is on the Sparrow." I Go to the Rock features six new unreleased gospel tracks "He Can Use Me," "I Found a Wonderful Way" and "Testimony"; and Houston's live performances of "Bridge Over Troubled Water" with singer CeCe Winans, "This Day" and "He/I Believe".

== Commercial performance ==
I Go To The Rock: The Gospel Music of Whitney Houston debuted at number 2 on the Billboard Top Gospel Albums chart dated April 8, 2023. According to Billboard, the compilation garnered 4,000 equivalent album sales during the tracking week ending March 30, 2023, propelling it at number two spot.

The album marks Houston's second top ten spot and entry into the Top Gospel Albums chart, following 1996's The Preacher's Wife soundtrack which debuted at number one and held the top spot for 26 consecutive weeks and remained on the chart for 165 weeks. The compilation has since spent 31 cumulative weeks on the chart. On October 26, 2023, the album was announced as a finalist for the Billboard Music Awards for Top Gospel Album.

== Track listing ==
I Go to the Rock: The Gospel Music of Whitney Houston track listing
No.	Title	Writer(s)	Producer(s)	Length
1.	"I Go to the Rock" (with the Georgia Mass Choir)	Dottie Rambo	Whitney Houston; Mervyn Warren	4:05
2.	"Jesus Loves Me"	Anna Bartlett Warner; William Batchelder Bradbury	BeBe Winans; Houston	5:12
3.	"He Can Use Me"	Ann Lendy Lewis; Steve Abdul Kahn Brown	Brown; Freaky Rob; D. Phelps	4:55
4.	"Joy to the World" (with the Georgia Mass Choir)	Traditional	Houston; Warren	4:41
5.	"Bridge Over Troubled Water" (with Cece Winans) (Live VH1 Honors – June 22, 1995)	Paul Simon	Ken Ehrlich	5:35
6.	"Testimony"	Lewis; Brown	Brown; Freaky Rob; D. Phelps	3:40
7.	"I Look to You"	R. Kelly	Emanuel Kiriakou; Harvey Mason Jr.; Tricky Stewart	4:26
8.	"His Eye Is on the Sparrow"	Civilla D. Martin; Charles H. Gabriel	R. Kelly	3:33
9.	"Hold On, Help Is On the Way" (with the Georgia Mass Choir)	Rev. Kenneth Paden	Houston; Warren	4:14
10.	"This Day" (Live VH1 Honors – June 22, 1995)	Edwin Hawkins	Ehrlich	3:55
11.	"I Found a Wonderful Way"	Lewis; Brown	Brown	2:47
12.	"Joy" (with the Georgia Mass Choir)	Kirk Franklin	Houston; Warren	3:16
13.	"I Love the Lord" (with the Georgia Mass Choir)	Richard Smallwood	Houston; Warren	4:57
14.	"He / I Believe" (Live at Yokohama Arena – January 2, 1990)	Jack Richards; Richard Mullan		6:26
Total length:				61:42

== Personnel ==
Credits adapted from album liner notes.

- Compilation Producer – Barry Jennings

== Charts ==
=== Weekly charts ===
Weekly chart performance for I Go to the Rock: The Gospel Music of Whitney Houston
Chart (2023)	Peak position
UK Album Downloads (OCC)	71
US Top Album Sales (Billboard)	37
US Top Gospel Albums (Billboard)	2

=== Year-end charts ===
2023 year-end chart performance for I Go to the Rock: The Gospel Music of Whitney Houston
Chart (2023)	Position
US Top Gospel Albums (Billboard)	17

2024 year-end chart performance for I Go to the Rock: The Gospel Music of Whitney Houston
Chart (2024)	Position
US Top Gospel Albums (Billboard)	44

== See also ==
- The Preacher's Wife: Original Soundtrack Album
