= Love Will Save the Day =

Single by Whitney Houston

from the album Whitney
- B-side: "How Will I Know"
- Released: May 10, 1988
- Recorded: 1986–1987
- Studio: Larrabee (Los Angeles); Sigma Sound (New York); Soundtrack (New York); The Hit Factory (New York); Z Studio (New York)
- Genre: Dance; dance-pop
- Length: 5:25 (album version); 4:22 (single version)
- Label: Arista
- Songwriter: Toni Colandreo (Toni C.)
- Producer: John "Jellybean" Benitez

Whitney Houston singles chronology
"Where Do Broken Hearts Go" (1988)	"Love Will Save the Day" (1988)	"One Moment in Time" (1988)

Licensed audio
- "Whitney Houston - Love Will Save the Day (Official Audio)" on YouTube

"Love Will Save the Day" is a song recorded by American singer Whitney Houston from her second diamond studio album Whitney (1987). The song was released in May 1988 by Arista Records as the album's fifth single.

Written by Toni C. and produced by John "Jellybean" Benitez, the song conveys a message of hope and resilience in the face of life's challenges. It featured a guest appearance by vibraphonist Roy Ayers.

Despite not producing a music video, the song was still successful, becoming a top ten single in various countries, including the United States, where it peaked at number nine on the Billboard Hot 100.

Notable for breaking Houston's historic streak of seven consecutive number one singles, the song still made chart history for Houston, becoming her ninth consecutive top ten single on the Billboard Hot 100 and made her just the third female artist to score five top ten pop singles off a single album.

It also landed in the top ten on three other major Billboard charts, reaching number one on the Hot Dance Club Songs chart, becoming Houston's third straight chart-topper on that chart. It also reached the top ten in Canada, the UK, Ireland, Belgium, France, the Netherlands and Luxembourg.

== Production and recording ==
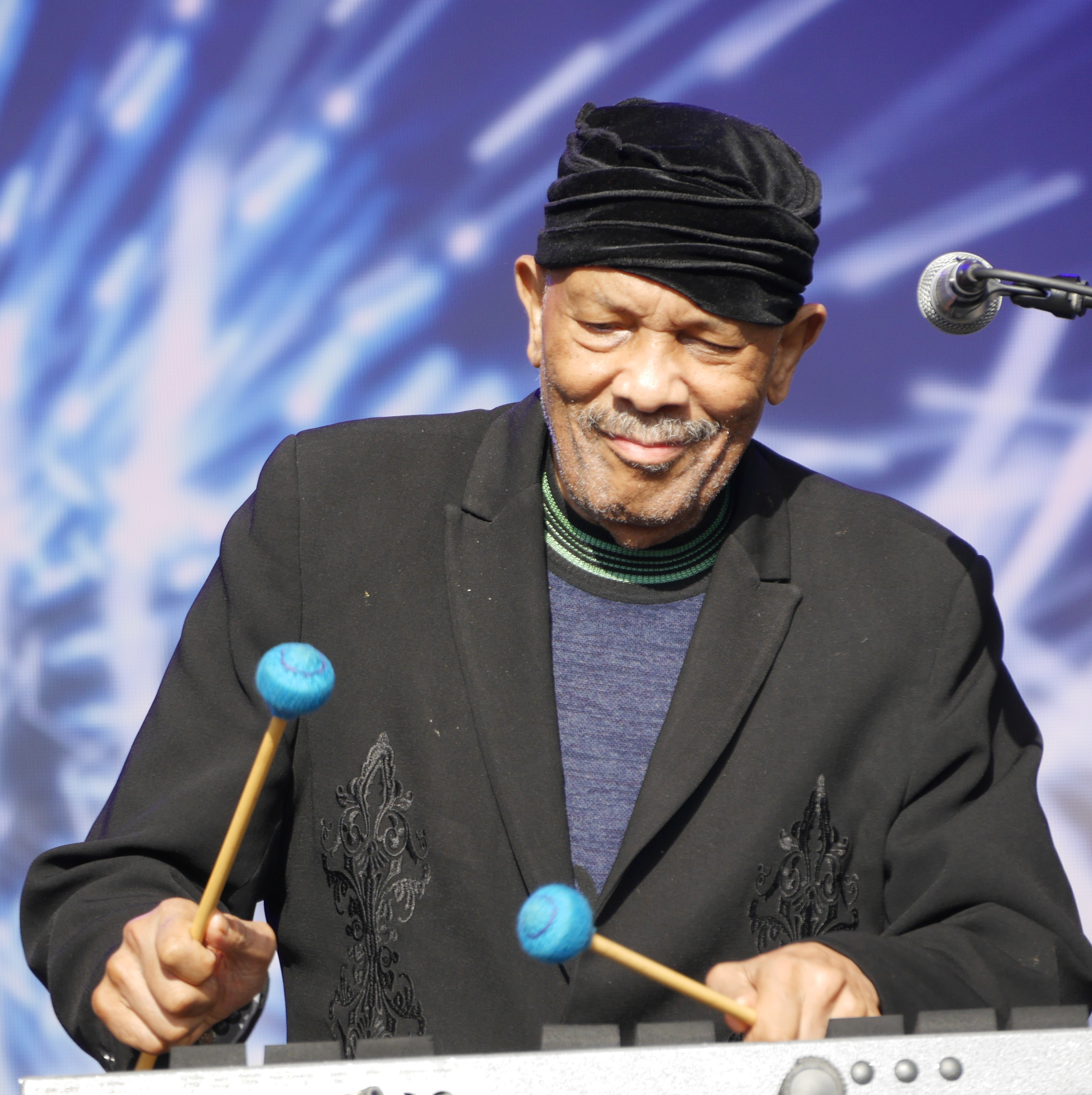
Musician Roy Ayers (pictured in 2019) contributed to the song by providing a vibraphone solo.

After helping to produce a successful dance remix of Houston's hit single "How Will I Know", which peaked at number three on the Billboard dance singles chart in 1986, Arista head Clive Davis hired John "Jellybean" Benitez to produce an original dance song for Houston's upcoming sophomore album, Whitney.

Prior to being assigned by Davis, Benitez had achieved success by producing and remixing many of Madonna's early hit singles. Houston was just the second major recording artist after Madonna that Benitez worked with.

Seeking a message song with a dance beat, Benitez brought in his frequent collaborator, songwriter Toni Colandreo, (known as Toni C.) to be the song's lyricist.

The song was notable for being the only song on the Whitney album to not be helmed by Houston's previous collaborators including Narada Michael Walden and Michael Masser, as well as one of the earliest songs in her catalog where Houston sang both lead and background vocals.

Like most of her songs, Houston was credited as vocal arranger. The song included a vibraphone solo by acclaimed jazz-funk musician Roy Ayers.

== Critical reception ==
The song received mixed reception from critics following the release of the Whitney album.

Los Angeles Times editor Robert Hilburn described the song as a "hollow dance track that tries to mix social comment with dance-floor vigor."

In a positive review, Rolling Stone's Vince Alleti wrote: "Jellybean clicks neatly with 'Love Will Save the Day,' the only song to even remotely acknowledge the problems of the world at large and the most vivaciously percussive track on the record."

A Whitney fanpage described this song as Latin influenced, sparkling song.

St. Petersburg Times editors Eric Snider and Annelise Wamsley described Love Will Save the Day as "a unique tune on an extremely mainstream album. Its lively Afro-Cuban flavor, driven by a wall of clattering percussion, is truly joyous."

== Chart performance ==
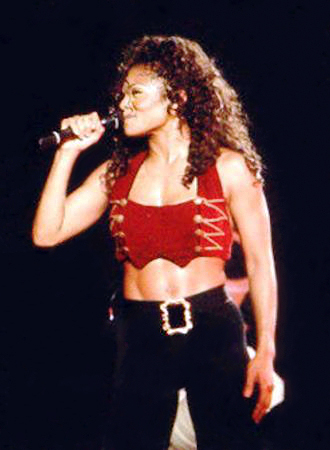
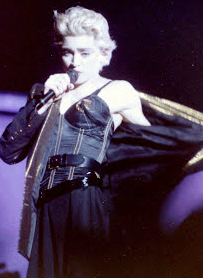
"Love Will Save the Day" made Houston the third female artist after Janet Jackson (pictured in 1995) and Madonna (pictured in 1987) to produce five top ten singles off a single album.

At the time, Houston had achieved a record-breaking string of seven consecutive number-one hits, with four of those number-ones from her current album Whitney, a record the singer still holds.

"Love Will Save the Day" did not become Houston's eighth consecutive number one, but continued her trend of hit singles by peaking in the US top ten.

The song also made the top 10 without an accompanying music video. With five top ten singles off the same album, Houston joined Madonna and Janet Jackson as just the third female artist to achieve this milestone.

On the Billboard Hot 100, the song debuted at number 52 as the Hot Shot Debut on the July 2, 1988 issue. The following week on the July 9 issue, it became Houston's ninth top 40 single, moving up to number 40.

Seven weeks later, on the August 27, 1988 issue, it peaked at number 9, becoming her ninth consecutive top ten single, making her just the third solo female artist after Brenda Lee and Madonna to achieve this.

It would remain in that position for two weeks and spent four entire weeks in the top ten overall. Spending 16 cumulative weeks on the chart, it stayed inside the top 40 for 11 of those weeks.

It reached number five on the Hot Black Singles chart for the week of September 3, 1988, becoming her eleventh consecutive top ten single on that chart as well as her tenth top five single.

In doing this, Houston became the first recording artist to produce five top five R&B singles off two or more albums.

It reached number ten on the Hot Adult Contemporary chart for the week of August 6, 1988, becoming her tenth consecutive top ten single on that chart.

It topped the Hot Dance Club Play chart for the week of August 20, 1988, replacing Vanessa Williams' "The Right Stuff" and becoming Houston's third number one single on that chart.

It was her third consecutive number one single there following "I Wanna Dance with Somebody (Who Loves Me)" and "So Emotional". It also joined those songs as well as "How Will I Know" as Houston's fourth single to hit the top ten on the pop, R&B, dance and adult contemporary charts.

It reached the top 20 of the Cash Box Top 100 Singles chart, peaking at number 11 for two weeks in August 1988. On the CHR Pop Radio & Records chart, it spent ten weeks, peaking at number 7 there.

Outside the United States, the song achieved success as well, peaking at number 8 on the Canadian RPM singles chart. In the UK, it entered the OCC Singles chart at number 27 on May 28 before peaking at number 10 the following week (June 4), becoming Houston's sixth top ten single.

In Ireland, it reached number 8. It also reached the top ten in Belgium, France, Luxembourg, Spain and the Netherlands, where it peaked at number 6 while reaching the top 20 in Switzerland. It also reached the top 40 on the West Germany charts and landed on the Australian charts as well.

== Live performances ==
Houston gave a live performance of the song during the Special Olympics Summer Games Opening Ceremony on August 2, 1987, at the University of Notre Dame in South Bend, Indiana.

It aired on ABC the following day and on some music video stations, including VH1, BET and MTV, was used as the "official" music video clip since Houston didn't film a music video for the song.

Houston only sporadically performed the song on two of her world tours -- the Moment of Truth World Tour (1987-1988) and The Bodyguard World Tour (1993-1994).

In the former tour, Houston was broadcast on the Italian TV network Rai Uno, performing the song during a stop in her historic nine date sold-out residency at London's Wembley Arena where Houston and her background singers, including first cousin Felicia Moss, performed basic choreography during the song. Houston also gave a live performance of the song among seven others during the Nelson Mandela 70th Birthday Tribute concert in front of 72,000 people at London's Wembley Stadium.

Houston performed the song live during five concert tapings of the latter tour in 1994, the first four in the South American cities of Rio de Janeiro, Santiago, Buenos Aires and Caracas as well as the South African city of Johannesburg at its Ellis Park Stadium, where her concert there aired on HBO.

In 2024, the concert film, Whitney: The Concert for a New South Africa (Durban), captured the singer performing the song at Durban's Kings Park Stadium.

== Legacy and accolades ==
After her death in 2012, Entertainment Weekly ranked the song #20 on its "Whitney Houston: Her 25 Best Songs" list and stated: "the Miami bass and spicy horns on this high-BPM (beats per minute) dance-pop workout pointed to Houston's willingness to experiment and evolve."

BET ranked it 18th place on their list of the 40 best Whitney Houston songs.

In his obituary on Houston, Clay Cane of The Advocate cited the song among two other Houston songs -- "Where Do Broken Hearts Go" and "One Moment in Time" -- as songs that were part of the gay community's playlist "for a horrific moment in the lives of gays".

The single has been covered 17 times, sampled 18 times and remixed 5 times according to the sample database site, WhoSampled.

== Track listings and formats ==
- US 7-inch vinyl
  - A1: "Love Will Save the Day" – 4:19
  - B1: "How Will I Know" (edited remix) – 4:45
- US CD maxi-single promo
  - "Love Will Save the Day" (single version) – 4:22
  - "Love Will Save the Day" (extended remix) – 7:59
  - "Dub Will Save the Day" – 4:59
  - "Love Will Save the Day" (a cappella) – 5:18
- Europe CD maxi-single
  - "Love Will Save the Day" (extended club mix) – 7:59
  - "Love Will Save the Day" (single version) – 4:22
  - "Hold Me" (Duet with Teddy Pendergrass) – 6:01
- UK 12-inch vinyl
  - A1: "Love Will Save the Day" (extended remix) – 6:55
  - B1: "Hold Me" (Duet with Teddy Pendergrass) – 6:00
- Canada 12-inch vinyl
  - A1: "Love Will Save the Day" (extended remix) – 7:58
  - A2: "Love Will Save the Day" (a cappella) – 5:14
  - B1: "Love Will Save the Day" (single version) – 3:50
  - B2: "Dub Will Save the Day" – 4:58
- Germany 12-inch vinyl
  - A1: "Love Will Save the Day" (extended remix) – 6:55
  - B1: "Hold Me" (Duet) – 6:00
- Australia and New Zealand 12-inch vinyl
  - A1: "Love Will Save the Day" (extended remix) – 7:58
  - A2: "Love Will Save the Day" (a cappella) – 5:14
  - B1: "Love Will Save the Day" (single version) – 3:50
  - B2: "Dub Will Save the Day" – 4:58
- Spain 12-inch vinyl
  - A1: "Love Will Save the Day" (extended remix) – 6:55
  - B1: "Hold Me" (Duet with Teddy Pendergrass) – 6:00

Other versions

- Extended remix edit – 6:55
- 7" version – 4:22
- 12" version – 5:21
- 12" version (instrumental) – 5:21 (unreleased)
- Acappella – 5:14
- Jellybean remix – 7:28
- The Underground mix – 7:30
- The Underground edit – 5:40
- Dub – 6:00
- Instrumental dub – 6:00

== Personnel ==
- Executive producer – Clive Davis
- Produced by John "Jellybean" Benitez
- Arranged by Jack Waldman and Toni C.
- Vocals arranged by Whitney Houston
- Engineered by Doc Dougherty and Michael Hutchinson
- Additional engineering by Dennis McKay
- Mix engineer by Michael Hutchinson
- Written by Toni C.
- Jellybean – drum programming
- Linden Aaron – Simmons toms
- Jack Waldman, Fred Zarr – synths
- Paul Jackson, Jr. – guitar
- Roy Ayers – vibes
- Paulinho da Costa, Bashiri Johnson, Sammy Figueroa – percussion
- Background vocals – Whitney Houston

== Charts ==
=== Weekly charts ===
Chart (1988–1989)	Peak position
Australia (ARIA)	84
Belgium (Ultratop 50 Flanders)	8
Canada Top Singles (RPM)	8
Canada Retail Singles (The Record)	40
European Hot 100 Singles (Music & Media)	35
France (SNEP)	7
Ireland (IRMA)	8
Luxembourg (Radio Luxembourg)	7
Netherlands (Dutch Top 40)	6
Netherlands (Single Top 100)	6
Quebec (ADISQ)	2
Spain (AFYVE)	9
Switzerland (Schweizer Hitparade)	18
UK Singles (Official Charts)	10
US Billboard Hot 100	9
US Hot R&B/Hip-Hop Songs (Billboard)	5
US Adult Contemporary (Billboard)	10
US Dance Club Songs (Billboard)	1
US Radio & Records CHR/Pop Airplay Chart	7
West Germany (GfK)	37

=== Year-end charts ===
Chart (1988)	Position
Canada Top Singles (RPM)	95
Canada Dance/Urban (RPM)	23
Netherlands (Single Top 100)	59
US Top Black Singles (Billboard)	74
US Top Dance Club Play Singles (Billboard)	13

== See also ==
- List of number-one dance singles of 1988 (U.S.)
