= Benjamin Green =

Benjamin, Ben, Benny or Bennie Green may refer to:

== Composers and musicians ==
- Bennie Green (1923–1977), American jazz trombonist
- Benny Green (saxophonist) (1927–1998), English broadcaster, music and cricket writer
- Benny Green (pianist) (born 1963), American hard bop jazz teacher
- Ben Green (composer) (born 1964), Israeli producer and songwriter
- Ben Green (musician) (born 1964), American singer and songwriter
- G. C. Green (Ben George Christian Green, born 1964), English heavy metal bassist, co-founder of Godflesh

== Sportsmen ==
- Benny Green (footballer) (1883–1917), English inside-forward
- Ben Green (cricketer) (born 1997), English right-arm bowler
- Ben Green (racing driver) (born 1998), English racing driver

== Others ==
- Benjamin Green (merchant) (1713–1772), colonial Canadian administrator and judge
- Benjamin A. Green (1888–1960), American lawyer, business person, mayor
- Benjamin Richard Green (1807/8–1876), English watercolour painter and author
- Benjamin Green (c. 1811–1858), English architect who partnered with his father as John and Benjamin Green
- Ben Charles Green (1905–1983), American federal jurist
- Ben K. Green (1912–1974), American writer about Southwestern horses
- Ben Green (comedian) (born 1973), English actor and comedy writer
- Ben Green (mathematician) (born 1977), English professor at Oxford
- Ben Green (producer), British media and podcast producer since 2000s

== Characters ==
- Benny Green, teenage drama pupil played by Terry Sue-Patt on BBC's Grange Hill in 1978–1982

== See also ==
- Benjamin Greene (disambiguation)
