= Francesca Beghe =

American singer-songwriter

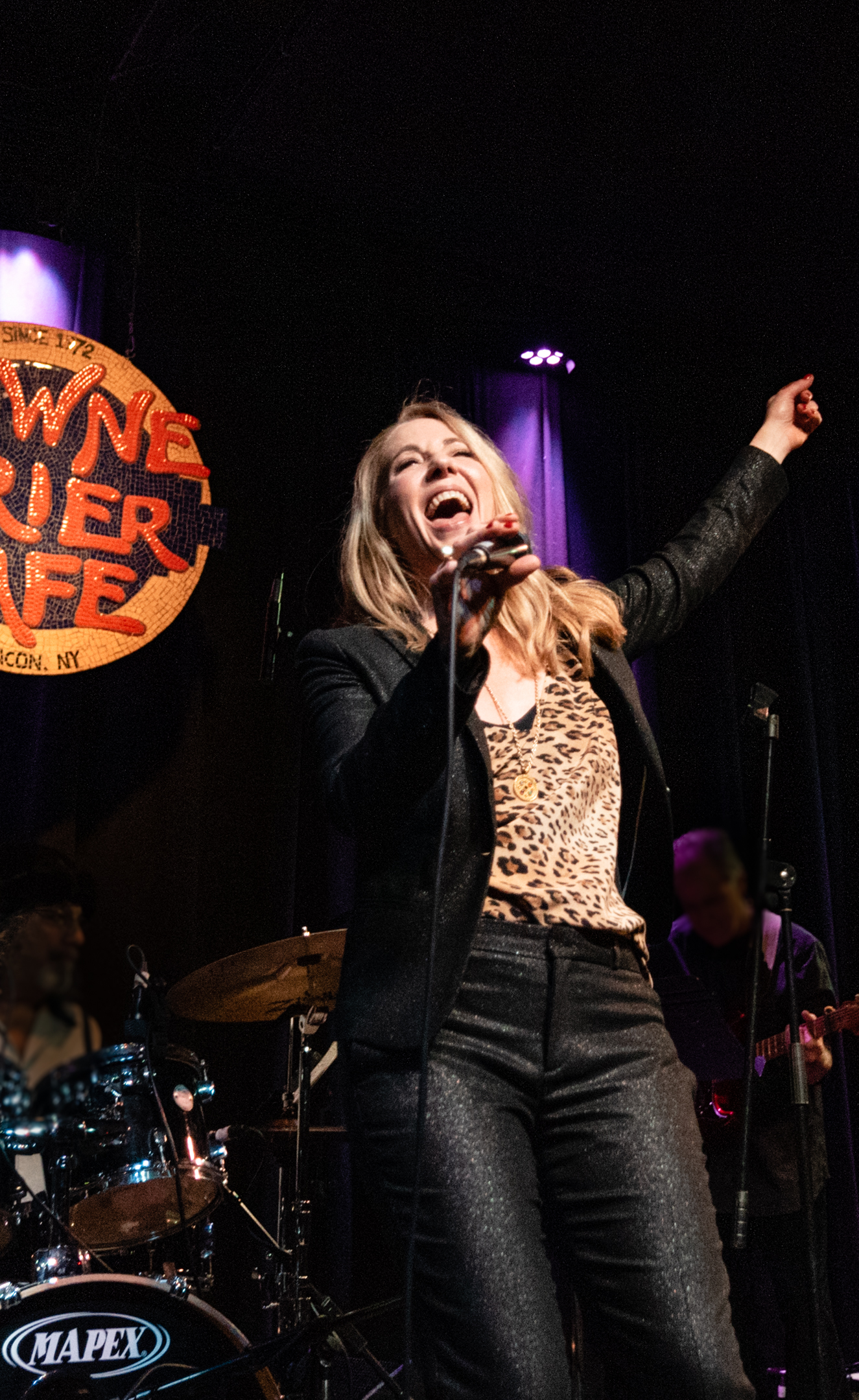
- Beghe performing in 2020
- Born: New York City, U.S.
- Education: University of Chicago
- Occupations: Singer-songwriter; musician (piano, keyboards, wurlitzer)
- Years active: 1980–present
- Spouse: Ben Green (m. 1997)
- Relatives: Jason Beghe (brother); Charles S. Deneen (great-grandfather)
- Musical career
- Genres: Singer-songwriter; Soulful Pop
- Labels: EMI Records Group; SBK Records; ASRC Records
- Website: francescabeghe.com

Francesca Beghe is an American singer-songwriter from New York, best known for co-writing "Trust in Me", recorded by Joe Cocker and Sass Jordan, which was featured in the 1992 film, The Bodyguard and on the Grammy award-winning The Bodyguard (soundtrack) which certified 18× platinum and peaked at No. 1 on Billboard in 1992. Beghe has appeared on The Tonight Show, was featured as VH-1's Artist of the Month, and toured the US as the opening act for Michael Bolton.

== Music career ==
Beghe began performing at clubs in New York City and joined the band Rogue, in 1980, as their lead vocalist and keyboard player. They opened shows for musical acts such as Jerry Garcia and Muddy Waters performing at The Bitter End, The Bottom Line, The Ritz, and The Limelight, among others. In addition to performing live, she recorded jingles for the New York Lottery and Kodak commercials.

In 1987, Beghe co-wrote "Trust in Me" with Marc Swersky and Charlie Midnight. She was signed to a publishing deal with EMI Blackwood Publishing which led to a record deal with SBK Records, at the end of 1990. Musician magazine described the album as "the kind of stunning, poised debut they don't make anymore" while People Magazine called Francesca Beghe "a musical gourmet…" describing her music as "...a little Rock, Jazz, Soul, Gospel, Country and her informed respect for all those genres is evident".CD Review referred to Beghe as "a brilliant new star".

In August 1991, she was featured as VH-1's Artist of the Month and in November 1991 Beghe toured the US as the opening act for Michael Bolton.

Beghe released two albums, Francesca Beghe (1991) and Dreamworld (2006) and her songs have been recorded by recording artists Kimberly Scott, Irma Thomas (No Use Talkin' was in the film, Double Jeopardy), and Fernando Saunders, among others.

Names on a Wall (written and performed by Beghe), about the Vietnam War Memorial Wall in Washington D.C., was featured in an anti-war video produced by the group Veterans for Peace.

While Beghe was working on her second album (produced by Glen Ballard), her record label SBK became EMI and subsequently the album was never released. In 2006 she released Dreamworld, which she described as "a 2½ year labor of love. I was fortunate to work with an amazing group of musicians and technicians to hone and polish every song until it felt just right."

"Trust in Me", (co-written by Beghe, Charlie Midnight, and Marc Swersky), was originally recorded as a duet by Joe Cocker and Renee Geyer on his album, Unchain My Heart in 1987. However, "Trust in Me" was selected for The Bodyguard Soundtrack of the 1991 film, The Bodyguard, as one of the songs on the album as Kevin Costner, its star, was a Joe Cocker die-hard fan. It was then recorded as a duet featuring (Cocker and Sass Jordan). The Soundtrack album became the best-selling of all time with sales of 45 million copies worldwide, and the 15th best-selling album in the United States. It peaked at No. 1 on Billboard in 1992. The soundtrack went on to win the Grammy Award for Album of the Year and, in November 2017, was certified 18×platinum by the Recording Industry Association of America.

== Discography ==
| Year | Album | Song | Artist | Credit |
|---|---|---|---|---|
| 1987 | Unchain My Heart | "Trust in Me" | Joe Cocker/Renee Geyer | Songwriter |
| 1991 | Francesca Beghe | | Francesca Beghe | Songwriter, performer |
| 1992 | The Bodyguard Soundtrack/The Bodyguard (film) | "Trust in Me" | Joe Cocker/Sass Jordan | Songwriter |
| 1993 | Spin | Come a Little Closer | Fernando Saunders | Songwriter |
| 1993 | Spin | The Fire Keeps Burning | Fernando Saunders | Songwriter |
| 1997 | The Story of My Life | No Use Talkin' | Irma Thomas | Songwriter |
| 1998 | Kimberly Scott | Let Your Spirit Fly | Kimberly Scott | Songwriter |
| 2006 | Dreamworld | | Francesca Beghe | Songwriter, performer |

== Early life ==
Beghe was born to parents, Renato and Bina (née House) Beghe in Manhattan, New York. Her father, Renato, was a Judge who had served on the Tax Court since his appointment by President George H. W. Bush, on March 26, 1991. Beghe studied classical piano and sang in a church choir as a child, citing musical influences as Carole King, Yes, and Elton John. She attended the University of Chicago.

== Family ==
Beghe's great-grandfather was Charles S. Deneen, a two-term governor of Illinois and one-term U.S. Senator in the late 1920s. Actor Jason Beghe, who portrays Hank Voight in the NBC TV series Chicago P.D., is her brother.
