= List of accolades received by The Bodyguard (1992 film) =

The Bodyguard is a 1992 American romantic thriller film directed by Mick Jackson. It starred Kevin Costner, Whitney Houston, Gary Kemp, Bill Cobbs and Ralph Waite. The film follows a former United States Secret Service agent turned bodyguard who is hired to protect a famous actress and singer from an unknown stalker.

== Academy Awards ==
Year	Category	Nominee / work	Result	Ref.
1992	Best Original Song	"I Have Nothing"; Music by David Foster; Lyrics by Linda Thompson	Nominated	
1992	Best Original Song	"Run to You"; Music by Jud Friedman; Lyrics by Allan Rich	Nominated	

== All Def Movie Awards ==
Year	Category	Nominee / work	Result	Ref.
2016	Most Helpful White Person	Kevin Costner	Nominated	

== American Black Achievement Awards ==
Year	Category	Nominee / work	Result	Ref.
1994	The Music Award	Whitney Houston	Won	

== American Music Awards ==
Houston's eight wins tied her with Michael Jackson for the most AMAs ever won in a single year. At that time, she also tied Kenny Rogers on the all-time list with 19 total AMAs. She won her fourth "Favorite Pop/Rock Female Artist" award and tied with Olivia Newton-John for the most AMAs won in this category.

Year	Category	Nominee / work	Result	Ref.
1994	American Music Award of Merit	Whitney Houston	Won	
1994	Favorite Adult Contemporary Artist	Whitney Houston	Nominated	
1994	Favorite Pop/Rock Female Artist	Whitney Houston	Won	
1994	Favorite Soul/R&B Female Artist	Whitney Houston	Won	
1994	Favorite Adult Contemporary Album	The Bodyguard: Original Soundtrack Album	Won	
1994	Favorite Pop/Rock Album	The Bodyguard: Original Soundtrack Album	Won	
1994	Favorite Soul/R&B Album	The Bodyguard: Original Soundtrack Album	Won	
1994	Favorite Pop/Rock Song	"I Will Always Love You"	Won	
1994	Favorite Soul/R&B Song	"I Will Always Love You"	Won	

== ASCAP Pop Awards ==
Year	Category	Nominee / work	Result	Ref.
1994	The Most-Performed Song	"I'm Every Woman"; Music and Lyrics by Nick Ashford and Valerie Simpson	Won	

== Billboard Music Awards ==
Houston is the co-holder of the record for the most Billboard Music Awards (11 awards) won in a single year since the award show has been held in 1990 - the awards with ★ marks were honored to her on the show and without ★ marks were not, but her extra #1-ranked-categories on Billboard year-end charts. She became the only artist to grab the top spots of Top Billboard 200 Album, Top R&B Album, Hot 100 Single and Hot R&B Single simultaneously in the history of the charts. She is the only artist to win Top R&B Album three times in the history of Billboard Year-End Charts to date, after Whitney Houston in 1986 and I'm Your Baby Tonight in 1991. In addition, Houston is the second artist behind Elton John and the only female artist to have two number-one Top Billboard 200 Album awards (formerly "Top Pop Album") on Billboard magazine year-end charts.

Year	Category	Nominee / work	Result	Ref.
1993	★Top Billboard 200 Album	The Bodyguard: Original Soundtrack Album	Won	
1993	★Top Hot 100 Singles Artist	Whitney Houston	Won	
1993	★Top Hot 100 Single	"I Will Always Love You"	Won	
1993	★Top Hot R&B Singles Artist	Whitney Houston	Won	
1993	★Top R&B Album	The Bodyguard: Original Soundtrack Album	Won	
1993	★Top Hot R&B Single	"I Will Always Love You"	Won	
1993	★Top Soundtrack	The Bodyguard: Original Soundtrack Album	Won	
1993	★Special Award: Top Album Most Weeks at #1 (20 weeks)	The Bodyguard: Original Soundtrack Album	Won	
1993	★Special Award: Top Single Most Weeks at #1 (14 weeks)	"I Will Always Love You"	Won	
1993	★Top World Artist	Whitney Houston	Won	
1993	★Top World Single	"I Will Always Love You"	Won	
1993	Top Hot Adult Contemporary Artist	Whitney Houston	Nominated	
1993	Top Hot 100 Singles Artist – Female	Whitney Houston	Won	
1993	Top Hot 100 Singles Sales #1	"I Will Always Love You"	Won	
1993	Top Hot R&B Singles Sales #1	"I Will Always Love You"	Won	

== BRAVO Magazine's Bravo Otto Awards ==
The BRAVO Otto Awards were determined by the readers' poll on BRAVO, the largest teen magazine within the German-language sphere. The 1993's poll began from the issue #45 (November 4) in 1993 and the results were released in the issue No. 1 (January 6) in 1994.

Year	Category	Nominee / work	Result	Ref.
1993	Best Female Singer – Silver Otto Award	Whitney Houston	Won	
1993	Best Actress – Silver Otto Award	Whitney Houston	Won	

== BMI Film & Television Awards ==
Year	Category	Nominee / work	Result	Ref.
1994	Film Music Award	Alan Silvestri – The Bodyguard	Won	
1994	Most-performed Song from a Film	"I Have Nothing"; Music by David Foster; Lyrics by Linda Thompson	Won	

== Brit Awards ==
Year	Category	Nominee / work	Result	Ref.
1994	Soundtrack/Cast Recording	The Bodyguard: Original Soundtrack Album	Won	

== Golden Raspberry Awards ==
Year	Category	Nominee / work	Result	Ref.
1992	Worst Picture	Lawrence Kasdan, Jim Wilson, and Kevin Costner	Nominated	
1992	Worst Actor	Kevin Costner	Nominated	
1992	Worst Actress	Whitney Houston	Nominated	
1992	Worst Screenplay	Lawrence Kasdan	Nominated	
1992	Worst New Star	Kevin Costner's crew cut	Nominated	
1992	Worst New Star	Whitney Houston	Nominated	
1992	Worst Original Song	"Queen of the Night"; Music and Lyrics by Whitney Houston, L.A. Reid, Babyface, and Daryl Simmons	Nominated	

== Grammy Awards ==
Houston won her third "Best Pop Vocal Performance, Female" award, which is the second record behind Ella Fitzgerald and Barbra Streisand; each received the award five times.

Year	Category	Nominee / work	Result	Ref.
1994	Album of the Year	The Bodyguard: Original Soundtrack Album – Whitney Houston (Note: Shared with Babyface, BeBe Winans, David Cole, David Foster, L.A. Reid, Narada Michael Walden, Robert Clivilles, and Clive Davis.)	Won	
1994	Record of the Year	"I Will Always Love You" – Whitney Houston (Note: Shared with David Foster.)	Won	
1994	Best Pop Vocal Performance, Female	"I Will Always Love You" – Whitney Houston	Won	
1994	Best R&B Vocal Performance, Female	"I'm Every Woman" – Whitney Houston	Nominated	
1994	Best Song Written Specifically for a Motion Picture or for Television	"I Have Nothing" – David Foster and Linda Thompson	Nominated	
1994	Best Song Written Specifically for a Motion Picture or for Television	"Run to You" – Jud Friedman and Allan Rich	Nominated	

== Japan Academy Film Prize ==
Year	Category	Nominee / work	Result	Ref.
1992	Outstanding Foreign Language Film	The Bodyguard	Nominated	

== Japan Gold Disc Awards ==
Year	Category	Nominee / work	Result	Ref.
1993	Album of the Year (International)	The Bodyguard: Original Soundtrack Album	Won	
1993	Compilation Album of the Year (International)	The Bodyguard: Original Soundtrack Album	Won	
1993	Single of the Year (International)	"I Will Always Love You"	Won	
1994	Special Award (Note: This award is presented to the product which released before that year, sales over one million units or sales higher than product get award on same category. The Bodyguard Soundtrack earned the award for sales of over 2 million copies and "I Will Always Love You" for 600,000 copies sold in 1993 only in Japan.)	The Bodyguard: Original Soundtrack Album	Won	
1994	Special Award	"I Will Always Love You"	Won	

== Juno Awards ==
Year	Category	Nominee / work	Result	Ref.
1994	Best Selling Album (Foreign or Domestic)	The Bodyguard: Original Soundtrack Album – Whitney Houston	Won	

== MTV Movie Awards ==
Year	Category	Nominee / work	Result	Ref.
1993	Best Movie	The Bodyguard	Nominated	
1993	Best Male Performance	Kevin Costner	Nominated	
1993	Most Desirable Male	Kevin Costner	Nominated	
1993	Best Female Performance	Whitney Houston	Nominated	
1993	Best Breakthrough Performance	Whitney Houston	Nominated	
1993	Best On-Screen Duo	Kevin Costner and Whitney Houston	Nominated	
1993	Best Song from a Movie	"I Will Always Love You" – Whitney Houston	Won	

== NAACP Image Awards ==
Year	Category	Nominee / work	Result	Ref.
1993	Outstanding Lead Actress in a Motion Picture	Whitney Houston	Nominated	
1993	Entertainer of the Year	Whitney Houston	Won	
1993	Outstanding Female Artist	Whitney Houston	Won	
1993	Outstanding Album	The Bodyguard: Original Soundtrack Album	Won	
1993	Outstanding Soundtrack Album (Film or Television)	The Bodyguard: Original Soundtrack Album	Won	
1993	Outstanding Music Video	"I'm Every Woman" – Whitney Houston	Won	

== The NARM Best Seller Awards ==
Year	Category	Nominee / work	Result	Ref.
1994	Best-selling Soundtrack	The Bodyguard: Original Soundtrack Album	Won	

== NABOB Communications Awards ==
Houston was the recipient of an Entertainer of the Year award from the National Association of Black Owned Broadcasters (NABOB) in 1994.

Year	Category	Nominee / work	Result	Ref.
1994	Entertainer of the Year	Whitney Houston	Won	

== People's Choice Awards ==
Houston won her fourth "Favorite Female Musical Performer" award. She didn't attend the show due to being nine months pregnant. Instead, she was given two awards at her home by her mother, Cissy Houston, and made an acceptance speech.

Year	Category	Nominee / work	Result	Ref.
1993	Favorite Motion Picture Actor	Kevin Costner	Won	
1993	Favorite Actor in a Dramatic Motion Picture	Kevin Costner	Won	
1993	Favorite Actress in a Dramatic Motion Picture	Whitney Houston	Nominated	
1993	Favorite Female Musical Performer	Whitney Houston	Won	
1993	Favorite New Music Video	"I Will Always Love You"	Won	

== Smash Hits Magazine's Smash Hits Poll Winners Party ==
The Smash Hits Poll Winners Party was an awards ceremony which ran from 1988 to 2005. Each award winner was voted by readers of the Smash Hits magazine.

Year	Category	Nominee / work	Result	Ref.
1993	Best Female Artist	Whitney Houston	Won	

== Soul Train Music Awards ==
At the 8th Soul Train Music Awards, Houston received Sammy Davis Jr. Award for her outstanding achievements in the field of entertainment during 1993.

Year	Category	Nominee / work	Result	Ref.
1993	Best R&B/Soul Single – Female	Whitney Houston – "I Will Always Love You"	Won	
1994	Best R&B/Soul Single – Female	Whitney Houston – "I Have Nothing"	Nominated	
1994	Best R&B/Soul Song of the Year	Whitney Houston – "I Will Always Love You"	Won	
1994	Sammy Davis Jr. Award for Entertainer of the Year	Whitney Houston	Won	

== World Music Awards ==
Houston holds the record for the most World Music Awards (five) won in a single year (tied with Michael Jackson).

Year	Category	Nominee / work	Result	Ref.
1994	World's Best Selling American Recording Artist of the Year	Whitney Houston	Won	
1994	World's Best Selling Female Recording Artist of the Era	Whitney Houston	Won	
1994	World's Best Selling Overall Recording Artist	Whitney Houston	Won	
1994	World's Best Selling Pop Artist of the Year	Whitney Houston	Won	
1994	World's Best Selling R&B Artist of the Year	Whitney Houston	Won	

== Yoga Awards ==
Year	Category	Nominee / work	Result	Ref.
1992	Worst Foreign Actor	Kevin Costner	Won	
