= The Bodyguard (soundtrack) =

1992 soundtrack album by Whitney Houston and various artists

The Bodyguard: Original Soundtrack Album

Soundtrack album by Whitney Houston and various artists
- Released: November 17, 1992
- Recorded: 1991–1992; 1987 for Joe Cocker's song
- Genres: Pop; urban pop; R&B
- Length: 57:44
- Labels: Arista; BMG
- Producers: Houston; David Foster; Narada Michael Walden; L.A. Reid; Babyface; Daryl Simmons; BeBe Winans; Walter Afanasieff; Ian Devaney; Andy Morris; Robert Clivilles; David Cole; Danny Kortchmar; Charlie Midnight; Roy Lott; Clive Davis; Ricky Crespo; Kenny G; Alan Silvestri

Whitney Houston chronology
I'm Your Baby Tonight (1990)	The Bodyguard: Original Soundtrack Album (1992)	The Preacher's Wife: Original Soundtrack Album (1996)

Singles from The Bodyguard
- 1. "I Will Always Love You" Released: November 2, 1992; 2. "Someday (I'm Coming Back)" Released: December 7, 1992; 3. "I'm Every Woman" Released: January 2, 1993; 4. "I Have Nothing" Released: February 20, 1993; 5. "Run to You" Released: June 21, 1993; 6. "Queen of the Night" Released: October 13, 1993 (UK)

The Bodyguard: Original Soundtrack Album is the first soundtrack album by American singer and actress Whitney Houston, released on November 17, 1992 by Arista Records to promote the film of the same name. It also contains songs by her label mates Lisa Stansfield, Kenny G, The S.O.U.L. S.Y.S.T.E.M. and Curtis Stigers as well as Joe Cocker. The album is credited as a Houston album, since she recorded the majority of the tracks.

The Bodyguard was Houston's theatrical film debut. Initially, Houston was reluctant to take on the role but was convinced by co-producer and co-star Kevin Costner to take it, to which she agreed. Arista Records president Clive Davis had apprehensions of Houston's role in the film without much music from the script, convincing Costner and the film's distributor Warner Bros. Pictures to add songs to the film, in which Houston made a deal for back royalties for its music and attained creative control. Houston agreed to record six tracks, five of which were featured in the film. Houston began working on the soundtrack in November 1991, and contacted previous producers of her work, including Babyface, Antonio "L.A." Reid, BeBe Winans and Narada Michael Walden, to participate in the album. It also marked the first time Houston worked with renowned producer David Foster, who would produce three of the six Houston tracks, as well as the production duo of Clivillés and Cole, while Houston herself co-produced two songs. Both Houston and Clive Davis were listed as executive producers on the album.

Upon its release in November 1992, The Bodyguard received mixed-to-positive reviews from music critics, who praised Houston's vocal performance but criticized certain aspects of its songwriting and production. The album was a global commercial success, topping the record charts in 21 countries, including the United States, the United Kingdom, Australia, Canada, New Zealand, Germany, Austria, Belgium, France, Italy and Japan as well as the European album chart. In the United States, the album debuted at number two on the Billboard 200, before climbing to number one in its second week of release, remaining there for 20 non-consecutive weeks, making it the first album by a female artist to top the charts for that many weeks. In its sixth week, it sold one million copies within a single week, making Houston the first artist to accomplish this following verification by Nielsen SoundScan. It would continue to sell a million copies a week for several weeks in a row, reaching over 26 million copies worldwide less than six months after its release, becoming one of fastest-selling albums of all time. The album would eventually be certified Diamond by the Recording Industry Association of America for sales of ten million copies in November 1993, becoming the first female album to sell that many copies in the United States and would be one of three Houston albums to receive that milestone, eventually selling 19 million in the country alone. Overall, the album would sell over 50 million copies worldwide, becoming the best-selling soundtrack album of all time, the best-selling album by a female artist in music history, and the best-selling album of the decade.

The album was supported by five Houston singles — "I Will Always Love You", "I'm Every Woman", "I Have Nothing", "Run to You" and "Queen of the Night". All five singles achieved chart success of varying degrees, with "I Will Always Love You" being the most successful, topping the charts in 34 countries and selling over 24 million copies worldwide, going on to become the best-selling single by a female artist of all time. Houston set a US chart record after three of the soundtrack's singles landed at the top twenty simultaneously on the Billboard Hot 100. Two of the songs — "I Have Nothing" and "Run to You" — each received nominations at the Academy Awards for Best Original Song. Though not officially released to promote the soundtrack, the non-Houston songs, "Someday (I'm Coming Back)" by Lisa Stansfield and " It's Going to Be a Lovely Day" by The S.O.U.L. S.Y.S.T.E.M., found moderate chart success as well. Houston further promoted the soundtrack with a lengthy world tour that lasted seventeen months between May 1993 and November 1994.

The soundtrack received several awards and accolades for Houston, including seven American Music Awards, a Brit Award, a Juno Award and the Grammy Award for Album of the Year, marking only the second time in Grammy history that an African American woman won the Grammy in that category. In 2017, a 25th anniversary re-release, I Wish You Love: More from The Bodyguard, was issued. In 2024, The Bodyguard was included in Rolling Stone's list of the 101 Greatest Soundtracks of All Time. As of 2026, music videos for "I Have Nothing" and "I Will Always Love You" have surpassed one billion views on YouTube, making the soundtrack the first 1990s album to have two videos with over 1 billion views. Houston is the first artist ever to have two 1990s videos to do so.

== Background ==
I got a call saying that there is a script that Kevin Costner has, called The Bodyguard, that he wanted me to do. He wanted me to costar with him. I went, "Yeah, sure." Then I called my agent, and she said, "Yeah, it's true." So I read the script. I liked the story, but in the beginning Rachel was very rough, very hard – a little bitch. - Whitney Houston to Rolling Stone (1993)

In late 1989, while planning work on her third studio album, I'm Your Baby Tonight, Houston received a call from actor Kevin Costner to accept a leading role in a film titled The Bodyguard. Back in December 1986, Billboard magazine mentioned that Houston would take part in the film, only with Clint Eastwood as the co-lead. Costner convinced Silverado director and friend Lawrence Kasdan to let him be a co-producer for the project. Kasdan had originally written the script for the film back in 1975 and after his script was sold off to Warner Bros. Pictures, the film had originally been pegged as a project for Steve McQueen and Diana Ross in 1977, but stalled. An attempt to make the film a vehicle for Ross and Ryan O'Neal by 1979 was also stalled after Ross rejected the film.

Following Houston's career rise in the mid-1980s, she was sought after for film work by Robert Townsend, Spike Lee and Robert De Niro. Costner reportedly was convinced of Houston being Rachel Marron after viewing the music video for her 1988 hit single, "Where Do Broken Hearts Go". Houston, who had only taken brief acting cameos on television shows such as Silver Spoons, was reluctant but agreed to read the script. A nervous Houston still held off on the film until Costner convinced the singer in another phone call around late 1990 that he will "not let [her] fall".

Despite some concerns from film executives as well as its director Mick Jackson of Houston's potential, the singer passed a screen test in January 1991. That April, Houston and Costner announced that they would co-star in The Bodyguard. Costner delayed production on the film until Houston finished her world tour that year to late November 1991.

== Recording ==
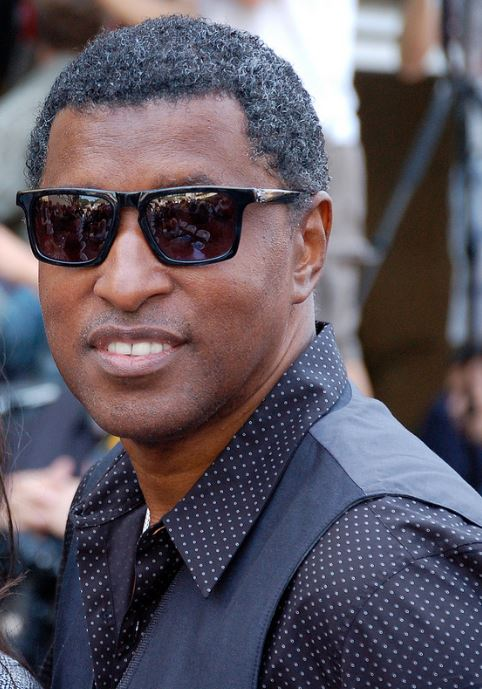
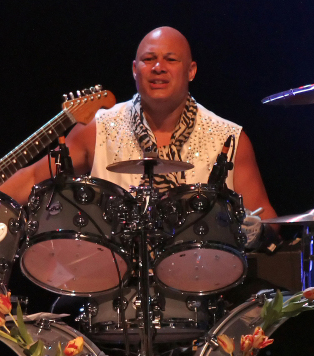
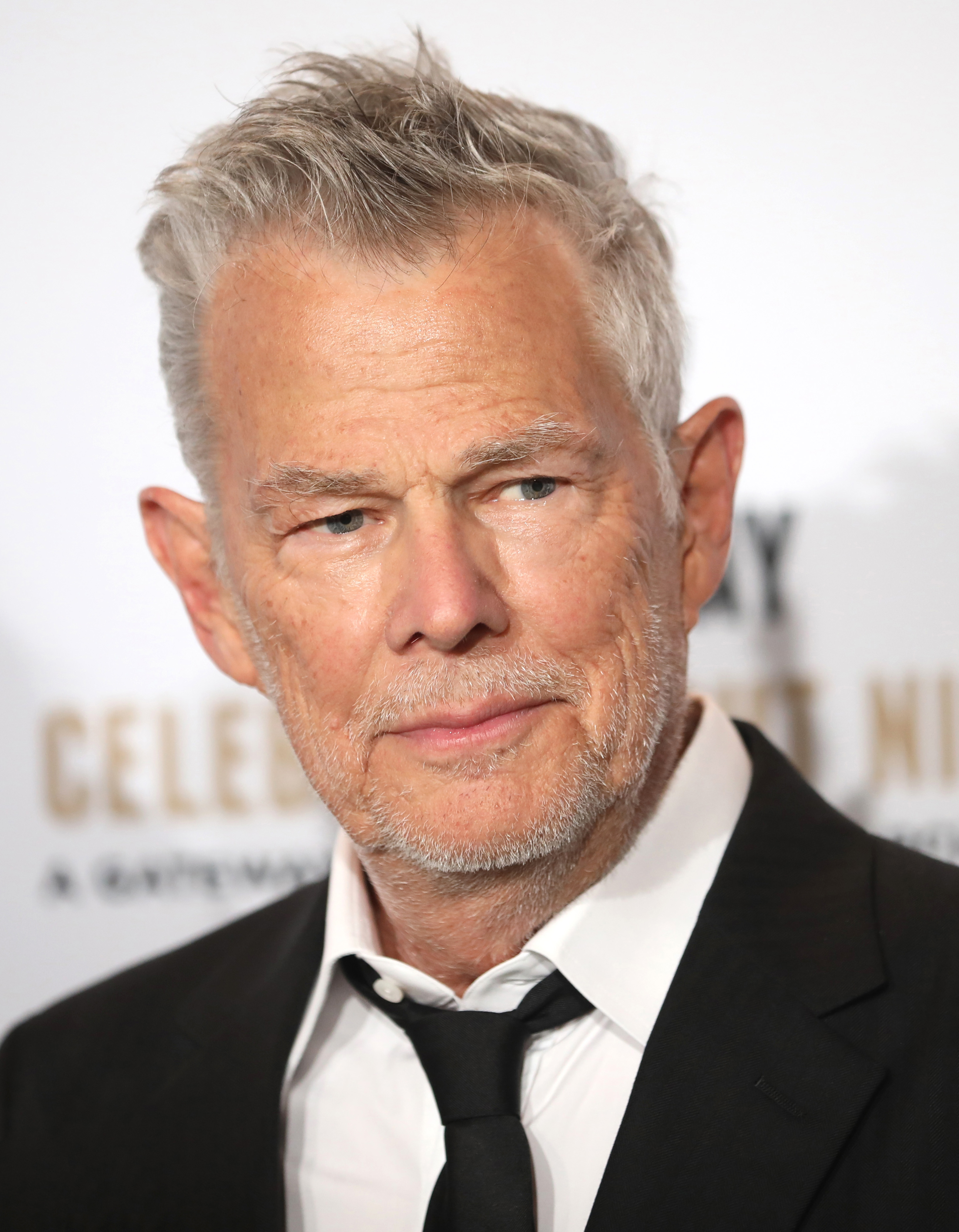
The Bodyguard soundtrack features contributions from Kenneth "Babyface" Edmonds, Narada Michael Walden and David Foster

Prior to shooting the film, Arista Records CEO Clive Davis was not sure about the film that, at the time, had little music attached to it and didn't understand why Houston's character, Rachel Marron, "needed a bodyguard". Davis admitted later he was "nervous" of Houston's acting aspirations. After reading the initial script, Davis, who was on the board of directors of CBS when CBS first went into film back in the 1960s and who was at the time, on the board of directors of Columbia Pictures, wrote a letter to Costner and Jackson, arguing to them that the film "is nowhere near fulfilling the potential of what Whitney could contribute to the role".

Davis further wrote in the letter: "The songs that she can sing, the respect and appeal from that, so directly ties into a need for a bodyguard, and provides the foundation of chemistry, potentially, between the two [characters]."

Costner and Jackson agreed with Davis and Houston, in a deal with Warner Bros Pictures, signed a deal for rights to the soundtrack's back royalties and agreed to record at least six tracks, with five of them to be featured on the film. Maureen Crowe became the film's music supervisor and worked with Houston and Costner on finding songs for the film.

Through the deal, Houston received executive producer credit on the album, attaining full creative control. Houston was executive producer of her last studio album, I'm Your Baby Tonight, in which the singer experimented with new jack swing, funk and soul music, as a response to black music critics who decried her work on her sophomore album, Whitney, of "selling out" to a white audience.

Houston began work on the soundtrack in mid-November 1991. For the first time in her career, Houston picked the producers she wanted to work with. (Note: Unlike I'm Your Baby Tonight, which Houston and Davis split executive producer credit, Houston personally called on the producers she wanted to work with, rather than Davis.) (Note: As Davis himself pointed out, he was "involved in the film".) According to singer and producer BeBe Winans, who worked on the project with Houston, the singer was "truly in control. She grew into that confidence. She was playing catch-up for the first and second album, and then she caught up to how to become immune to what people would do or say... For the Bodyguard soundtrack, she was who she was." He added that by the time of the soundtrack recording, Houston had become "more understanding of a song, more so than just singing the song, and was part of those decisions of what songs she was going to sing. Now if she trusted you, as she did other musicians and songwriters, she would allow you to do what you do, and again take that song and make it her own." For a while, Houston kept the music to herself, later stating "... I kept the music to myself for a long time. I didn't want anybody to hear it. I was very careful." Despite not being as heads on with the project as he had with Houston's previous albums, Davis's name was added as co-executive producer as he was in charge of deciding its single releases. Houston and Crowe, with additional help from Costner, were in charge of choosing songs for the soundtrack.

The first song Houston worked on was the rock song "Queen of the Night". Initially composed by Kenneth "Babyface" Edmonds and Daryl Simmons, the song had been left unfinished for weeks due to them being preoccupied by other songs they had penned for the soundtrack to the film, Boomerang, at the time. When Houston visited them at a Hollywood studio on November 9, they encouraged her to help out. As a result, Houston added lyrics and composition. Longtime collaborator Antonio "L.A." Reid became a fourth contributor after suggesting a drum intro. Canadian record producer David Foster had been booked to produce at least three songs for the album. The first of which, "I Have Nothing", was recorded on November 12, followed by "Run to You" three days later, on November 15. The songs had been handpicked by longtime Arista A&R Gerry Griffith, who discovered Houston a decade earlier and was instrumental in getting the singer signed to Arista.

During shooting of the film, which had begun principal photography on November 25, Houston and Foster continued to make edits to the songs. Foster later recalled that after picking Houston up following the shooting of the movie, the duo would work on vocals "at 9, 10 o'clock at night" and that the singer "was a laser beam". Foster further stated of Houston: "She'd walk into the studio, rip off her coat, get up and say 'Let's go.' Like a racehorse, no warm up, no nothing." Houston returned to the recording studio between January and February 1992 to co-produce a R&B-oriented rendition of the old gospel hymn, "Jesus Loves Me" with BeBe Winans. Houston arranged the session and advised Winans on adding new lyrics not included in the original hymn, as well as a bridge. According to Winans, neither Arista nor Warner executives felt it was necessary to add a gospel song but Houston insisted. Eventually it was agreed to add the song to both the film and on the soundtrack, fulfilling Houston's wish to professionally record gospel music.

Houston, Crowe and Costner struggled to find a song that would be the centerpiece of the album, as well as a "parting final song" by Houston's character at the end of the film. Initially, Costner had insisted on Houston recording the Motown standard, "What Becomes of the Brokenhearted", even suggesting that Houston sing the first verse a cappella and that it would be given a slower arrangement, but the song's choice didn't please neither Houston or Crowe, who felt the song was "like a dirge: 'Happiness is just an illusion, filled with sadness and confusion...'", adding jokingly, "you wanna kill yourself at the end of it!" Houston reportedly told Foster "this song doesn't really fit me."

Once it was learned the song was used for the film, Fried Green Tomatoes, and made into a Billboard chart hit by singer Paul Young in March 1992, Foster and Costner agreed to replace it with another song. According to Crowe, she was the one to suggest the country ballad, "I Will Always Love You", originally recorded and composed by Dolly Parton after hearing a rendition by Linda Ronstadt. Houston first performed it live at the Fontainebleau in Miami Beach in March 1992 during the final shooting of the film. Houston sang the first verse acapella to please Costner following the rejection of "What Becomes of the Brokenhearted". A month later, a studio recording commenced at Ocean Way Recording on April 22, 1992.

Prior to recording, Foster contacted Dolly Parton about recording the song. When the songwriter learned Foster was going to record the Ronstadt-inspired version, Parton suggested that Houston sing the third verse from her original recording as her original third verse had been a spoken recitation. Houston used her own band musicians, including drummer Ricky Lawson and saxophonist Kirk Whalum for the song's production. The final Houston song to be recorded for the album, a rendition of Chaka Khan's "I'm Every Woman", was recorded at producer Narada Michael Walden's Tarpan Studios in San Rafael, California and Ocean Way Recording Studios, the former session on August 19, and the latter, with Houston's vocals, in mid-October.

== Music and content ==
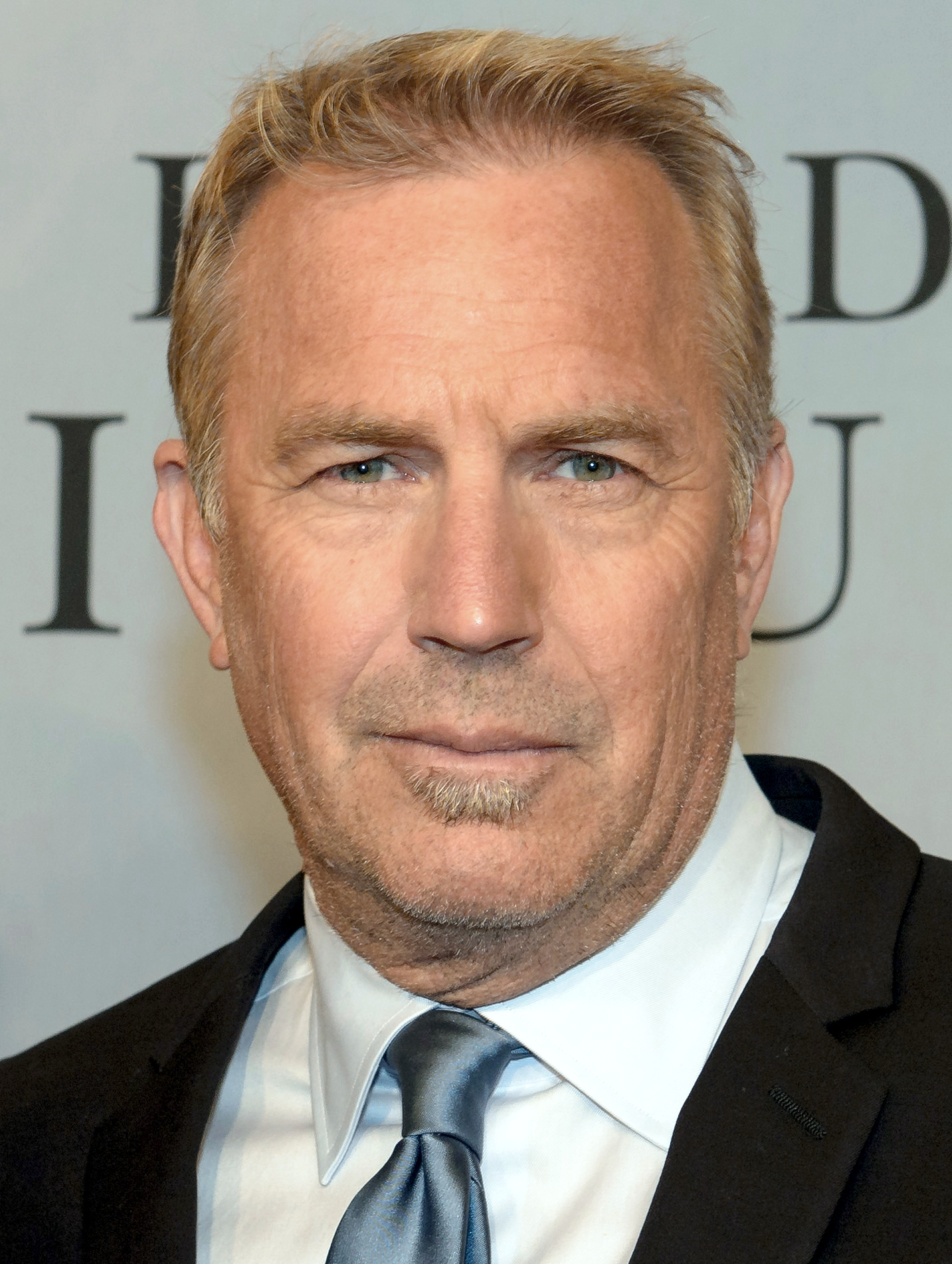
Kevin Costner (pictured in 2016) suggested Houston start singing the first verse of "I Will Always Love You" a cappella.

The soundtrack featured six Houston tracks, five tracks by various artists, and an instrumental, with Houston's material consisting of pop, urban pop and R&B with rock, house and gospel elements. With the Houston tracks, the themes on the album include heartbreak, unrequited love, feminism, partying and religion.

"I Will Always Love You" is Rachel Marron's parting song to Frank Farmer in the film. Houston begins the song a cappella, which lasts 45 seconds before soft strings and keyboard riffs by producer David Foster come in as Houston sings the chorus. In the middle of the song, during an instrumental break, Houston's saxophonist at the time, Kirk Whalum, adds a solo before Houston sings the third verse. The song then shifts into a dramatic key change thanks to Ricky Lawson's one note "solo" where he hits the toms, in which afterwards, Houston belts out a gospel-emulated wail in the last chorus before the song slows near the finale in which Houston ends it singing an operatic soprano on the word "you".

"I Have Nothing", penned by Foster and then-wife, songwriter Linda Thompson and inspired by Thompson's former relationship with American singer Elvis Presley, is a power ballad about deep love and the confusion that happens to lovers due to the different perceptions of women and men when it comes to relationship commitment. The song repeated the Houston-Foster formula of the previous track, with Houston singing in a soft soprano vocal in the first verse before belting it out in the chorus and second accompanying verse. The song also includes a dramatic key change along with horns and strings, arranged by Foster. Houston briefly multi-stacked her voice near the end of the track on the words, "don't you dare".

Originally recorded by funk singer Chaka Khan in 1978, "I'm Every Woman", penned by Ashford & Simpson, was Houston's first venture into house music, co-produced by longtime collaborator Narada Michael Walden and the production team of Clivillés and Cole and focused on a feminist theme, dedicated to women. It was one of the singer's personal picks to record for the album due to her being a longtime fan of Khan. During her career as a teenage session vocalist, Houston sang background vocals on Khan's sophomore solo album, Naughty (1980). Houston and Walden decided to add a soulful ballad intro to differentiate from the Khan original, with a faster tempo. Near the end, Houston references Khan's name similar to rap artist Melle Mel on Khan's 1984 hit, "I Feel for You". The song was recorded months after filming on The Bodyguard wrapped that March.

The love ballad, "Run to You", was originally a breakup song that changed into a romantic ballad after director Mick Jackson decided to include the song in the sequence where Frank falls in love with Rachel. Like in "I Will Always Love You" and "I Have Nothing", Houston recorded two different vocal takes, both of which were used, one for the film and the other for the album, while musically repeating the Houston-Foster formula of their previous collaborations.

"Queen of the Night" presents a harder rock sound similar to "So Emotional" from Whitney (1987) with additional elements of hip-hop, new jack swing and funk. Houston's second composition as a songwriter, the singer expresses how she "rules the club scene" as the self-proclaimed "queen of the night". Part of the lyrics was inspired by Michael Jackson's 1987 song, "Dirty Diana", from his Bad album and featured Living Colour lead guitarist Vernon Reid providing the guitar solo. According to BuzzFeed News, Houston's input on the song helped it to "[become] a high-energy, drum-centric, pop-rock showpiece, with Tina Turner–esque growling, that showed a different side of her persona." Houston provides both lead and background vocals to the song.

"Jesus Loves Me" was a R&B-arranged gospel song dedicated to Jesus. Produced by Houston and collaborator, gospel singer BeBe Winans, the song included new verses written by Winans, which Houston suggested, and included a church organ in the beginning and several key chord changes throughout the song and a soulful bridge. The song's recording was not included in the film but instead was briefly sung acapella by Michele Lamar Richards and Houston in the film.

The Lisa Stansfield recording, "Someday (I'm Coming Back)" was a disco-pop effort, similar to material Stansfield composed for her 1991 album, Real Love while the Kenny G song, "Even If My Heart Would Break", featuring Aaron Neville on vocals, was a middle of the road ballad also featured on the jazz musician's best-selling 1992 album, Breathless, which was released on the same day as The Bodyguard and helped Kenny G later win the American Music Award for Favorite Adult Contemporary Artist, the only award Houston lost out of eight nominations for the soundtrack. A second Kenny G ballad, the instrumental "Waiting for You", was featured on a few international issues of the soundtrack. Curtis Stigers lent his 1991 rendition of Nick Lowe's "(What's So Funny 'Bout) Peace, Love, and Understanding", while the R&B and dance act The S.O.U.L. S.Y.S.T.E.M., recorded the dance tune, "It's Gonna Be a Lovely Day!", which sampled Bill Withers's "Lovely Day". This is then followed by Alan Silvestri's instrumental theme to the film. The inclusion of Joe Cocker's "Trust in Me" was arranged by Kevin Costner and featured Canadian singer Sass Jordan as a duet vocalist.

== Promotion ==
=== Tour ===
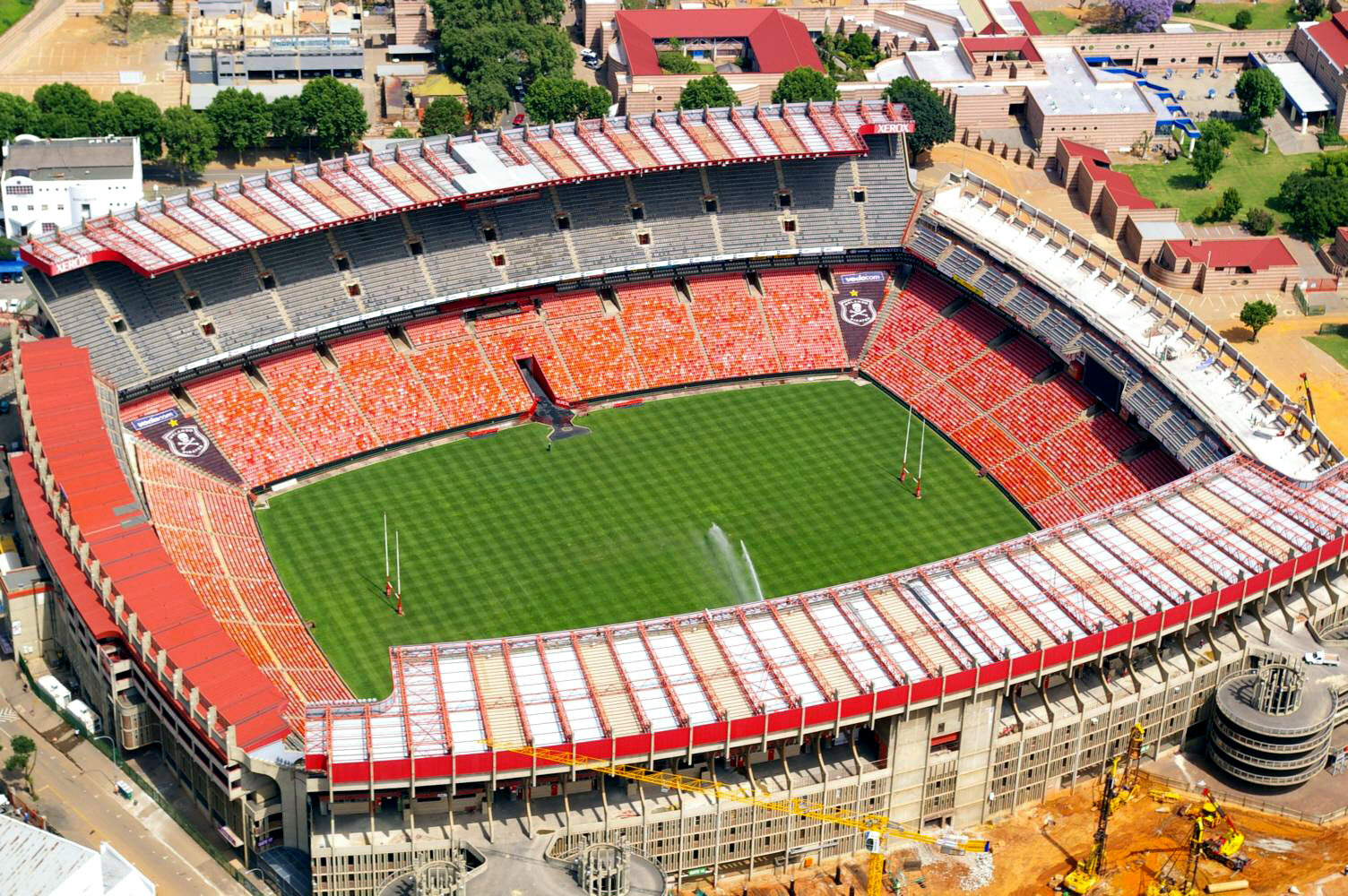
Ellis Park Stadium in Johannesburg, South Africa was one of the three venues Houston headlined in South Africa where Houston became the first international artist to headline shows at the country following the end of the country's apartheid laws in 1994.

Houston embarked on a world tour to continue promoting the album, which would remain on the charts throughout its duration. During the tour, Houston performed full length versions of all six of the Bodyguard tracks on the tour, with "I Have Nothing" and "I Will Always Love You" being prominently featured on the tour as showstoppers, with the latter song being performed near the end of the concert before returning onstage to sing "I'm Every Woman" as an encore, while "Jesus Loves Me" was performed as part of the gospel music portion of the show. "Queen of the Night" would start with the original hard rock version before Houston returned onstage and then it transformed into the house version, produced by C.J. Mackintosh. "Run to You" was sporadically performed during the tour on select dates.

Houston launched the tour at the James L. Knight Center in Miami, Florida on July 5, 1993, and ended it at the Green Point Stadium in Cape Town, South Africa on November 19, 1994, where she performed a total of 120 shows in front of more than half a million fans in five global continents and performed at the continents of South America and Africa for the first time in her career. During the 1993 leg, most of the dates were at theaters because Houston wanted an intimate setting. During the second North American leg of the tour, Houston performed at the opening ceremony of the 1994 FIFA World Cup at the Rose Bowl Stadium. Houston performed for the first time at stadiums in South America and South Africa to audiences as large as 75,000. The South Africa concerts in particular were special due to Houston being the first international artist to headline at the country following the abolishing of apartheid in the region and the presidential election win of Nelson Mandela. The Johannesburg show at Ellis Park Stadium aired on HBO to high ratings on November 12, while the November 8th show at Durban's Kings Park Stadium was posthumously shown at selected film theaters in October 2024 and was followed by a live recording, released on the 30th anniversary of the concert.

The tour proved to be a huge success as most of the dates were sold out. The success of the tour helped Houston make Forbes magazine's Richest Entertainers list. Houston earned over $33 million during 1993 and 1994, the third highest for a female entertainer. The tour led to several positive reviews of Houston's performance. During her first Radio City Music Hall performance in New York City, Stephen Holden of the New York Times wrote that "her stylistic trademarks — shivery melismas that ripple up in the middle of a song, twirling embellishments at the ends of phrases that suggest an almost breathless exhilaration — infuse her interpretations with flashes of musical and emotional lightning." At one of her Atlantic City dates, Kevin L. Carter of the Philadelphia Inquirer wrote that Houston handled her songs "with subdued emotionalism and the intelligence that only a gifted musician can bring to a song."

"Saving All My Love for You" was turned into a "smoky saloon-style ballad". Many critics noted that the highlight of the show was when Houston took on "And I Am Telling You" from Dreamgirls, and "I Loves You Porgy" from Porgy and Bess. Stephen Holden wrote of the medley that "her voice conveyed authority, power, determination and just enough vulnerability to give a sense of dramatic intention". As always, Houston included gospel songs. She introduced her band while performing 'Revelation.' Houston spoke about the Lord before going into 'Jesus Loves Me' which was often accompanied with complete silence from the mesmerized crowd." During Houston's seven consecutive sold-out residency at Radio City Music Hall in September 1994, New York Times critic Jon Pareles wrote, "Houston belted ballads, predictably bringing down the house with songs that moved from aching verses to surging choruses. A medley of hits from Dionne Warwick, Ms. Houston's cousin, lacked Ms. Warwick's lightness, but Ms. Houston made "Alfie" sound like the ethical wrangle it is". Ira Robbins of Newsday wrote, "Houston peaked in the Warwick segment with marvelous adaptions of "I Say a Little Prayer" and "Alfie", and "after the powerful one-two of "I Have Nothing" and a rendition of "Run to You" so compelling it would have been no shock to see Kevin Costner jog out".

=== Singles ===
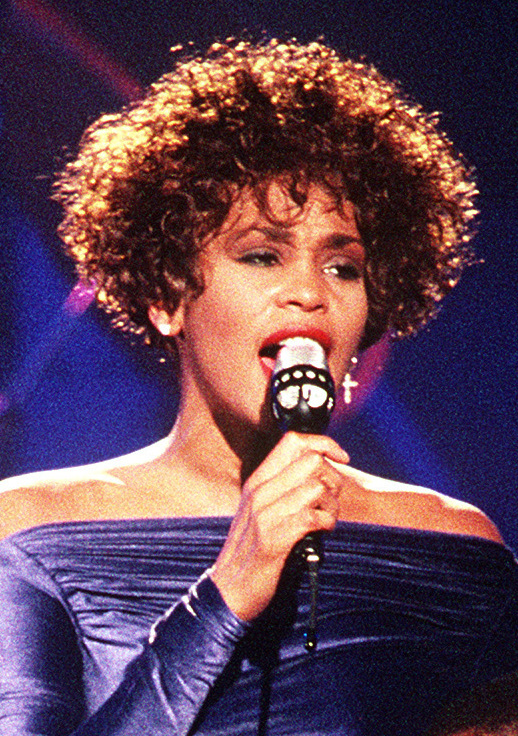
Houston became the first artist of the Nielsen Soundscan era to send three songs simultaneously inside the top 20 of the Billboard Hot 100.

"I Will Always Love You" was released as the lead single from the soundtrack, on November 2, 1992. The song became an immediate hit upon its release, receiving extensive airplay on multi-format stations as well as genre stations all over the country, appealing to pop, adult contemporary and R&B radio markets. On the November 14th issue of Billboard, "I Will Always Love You" entered the Billboard Hot 100 at number 40, making it Houston's third highest debut at the time. Two weeks later, on its November 28 issue, the song shot to number one, giving Houston her career tenth number one single, tying her with Madonna for most number ones by a female artist at the time. The song stayed at number one for a record fourteen weeks, all of them spent consecutively, which remains a record to this day.

The song took off internationally as well, landing number one for fourteen weeks in New Zealand, ten weeks in the United Kingdom and Australia, nine weeks in Norway, 8 weeks in France and Switzerland, six weeks in the Netherlands and 3 weeks in Sweden, as well as thirteen weeks atop the European Singles chart. Eventually, the song would reach the top ten in more than 40 countries and top the charts in 34 of those countries. At 24 million copies sold globally, it is the best-selling single of all time by a female artist. The music video for the song, notable for Houston sitting on a stool singing the song while scenes of the film were interpolated, became an immediate hit on all music video stations including MTV, earning heavy rotation. The success of the video helped Houston win the MTV Movie Award for Best Song. The song also became her career sixth number one single on the Hot R&B Singles chart, where it stayed for a then-record 11 consecutive weeks, and also became her career ninth number one hit on the adult contemporary chart, where it stayed for 5 consecutive weeks.

The album's second single, "I'm Every Woman", was released on January 2, 1993. The song also became an immediate success, eventually peaking at number four on the Billboard Hot 100, all while "I Will Always Love You" remained at number one on the chart. The song followed "I Will Always Love You" to international chart success, reaching the top ten in fifteen other countries including the United Kingdom, Canada, Poland, New Zealand, Italy, Belgium, Denmark and the European Singles chart, placing in more top ten placements throughout its tenure than the Chaka Khan original did fifteen years earlier. The song's music video, directed by Randee St. Nicholas, was also a hit, with Houston featuring notable women such as the song's original co-writer Valerie Simpson, R&B group TLC, mother Cissy Houston and the song's original vocalist Khan. It later won Houston the NAACP Image Award for Outstanding Music Video. The song reached number one on the Hot Dance Club Play chart, earning Houston her fourth career number one hit on the chart and her first to top the chart since "Love Will Save the Day" in 1988.

The third single, "I Have Nothing", was released on February 20, 1993, and also became an immediate hit, eventually peaking at number four on the Billboard Hot 100. During the week of March 13, 1993, Houston made chart history as the first artist since the verification of Nielsen SoundScan in 1991 to land three songs simultaneously in the top twenty of the Billboard Hot 100, where "I Have Nothing" shot up to number 11 while "I'm Every Woman" and "I Will Always Love You" were numbers five and seven respectively, repeating this for the week of March 20, 1993. In addition to its Academy Award nomination, the same song was nominated for the Grammy Award for Best Song Written for Visual Media, alongside "Run to You". The song reached number one on the Billboard Radio Songs and adult contemporary chart, earning a career tenth number one on the latter chart. The music video for the song also became a hit on every music video station as soon as it premiered.

The fourth song, "Run to You", was released as the next single on June 21, 1993. By this time of the album's chart tenure, it was selling anywhere between half a million and a million copies per week and due to this, the song only reached as high as number 31 on the Billboard Hot 100, becoming more of a modest success, though the song would spend 20 cumulative weeks on the chart, which showed Houston's strong chart presence at the time. Globally, its success was also modest, reaching the top ten in Canada, Ireland and Portugal, while peaking at number 15 in the United Kingdom. It was a bigger hit on the Billboard adult contemporary chart, reaching number ten.

The fifth song, "Queen of the Night", was mainly released only as a European market-only single on October 13, 1993. Its success on the European charts was also modest, reaching the top 20 in Belgium, Iceland, and the United Kingdom, where it reached number 14. In the US, a commercial single wasn't released, but the song made the top 20 on the Billboard Pop Airplay chart at number 17 and number 36 on its Radio Songs chart. Meanwhile, a house remix of the song by CJ Mackintosh, helped to send Houston a number one hit on the Billboard Hot Dance Club Play chart, giving Houston her first career number one chart single as a songwriter.

While it was never released as a single, "Jesus Loves Me" earned significant radio airplay on gospel stations. Following Houston's sudden passing in 2012, the song reached the Billboard Gospel Digital Song Sales chart at number four for the week of February 25 of that year, giving Houston a sixth top ten Billboard chart single from the soundtrack and was also one of many Houston tracks to chart there. It later charted on Billboard's Gospel Streaming Songs chart for the week of April 11, 2015, landing at number 23, one of three Houston gospel tunes to chart there that week. The song was the last from the soundtrack to reach the Billboard charts. It also remains the only version of "Jesus Loves Me" to make a record chart.

== Reception ==
=== Critical reception ===
Professional ratings
Initial reviews (in 1992/1993)
Review scores
Source	Rating
Entertainment Weekly	B
Los Angeles Times	2/4 stars
NME	4/10
New York Times	(favorable)
Orlando Sentinel	1/3 stars
Q	3/5 stars
Rolling Stone	2/5 stars
Select	1/5 medals
USA Today	2.5/4 stars

Professional ratings
Retrospective reviews (after 1992/1993)
Review scores
Source	Rating
AllMusic	3/5 stars
MusicHound R&B	4/5 stars
The Rolling Stone Album Guide	2/5 stars

Upon its release, The Bodyguard received mixed-to-positive reviews, with most of the positive reviews, aimed at the production of Houston's songs and Houston's vocals. AllMusic editor Stephen Thomas Erlewine views that the first half is characterized by urban pop songs similar to I'm Your Baby Tonight (1990), while the second half has miscellaneous tracks more "typical of a big-budget soundtrack".

In her Entertainment Weekly review, Amy Linden wrote, "Houston's portion [of the soundtrack] is evenly divided between (a) the pleasantly efficient, yet soulless stuff from her three albums and (b) two stunning cover versions, whose selection is both artistically satisfying and uncharacteristically hip for the MOR songbird."

In his December 23, 1992 review of the album for The Washington Post, Geoffrey Himes wrote that the soundtrack was "the [then] 29-year-old star's best album yet", stating that "it provides her with the best material and least obtrusive arrangements."

In its retrospective review, MusicHound declares the album "contains Houston's best vocal performance ever" with "I Will Always Love You".

In its Rolling Stone review, the soundtrack "is nothing more than pleasant, tasteful and urbane, but for a phenomenon, it's worthy of its numbers."

=== Commercial performance ===
In the US, The Bodyguard debuted at number two on the Billboard 200 chart dated December 5, 1992, behind Ice Cube's The Predator, selling 144,500 copies in the first week. In the following week dated December 12, the album topped the Billboard 200, for increased sales of 292,000 units. While the album stayed at the summit on the charts, it broke the sales record for most single-week sales twice. During its fifth week, it sold 831,000 copies, breaking the single-week sales record set by heavy metal band Guns N' Roses' 1991 set, Use Your Illusion II. The following week, it broke its own record for most albums sold in a single week since Nielsen SoundScan introduced a computerized sales monitoring system in May 1991 when it sold approximately 1,061,000 copies, making Houston the first artist in the SoundScan era to have an album sell over a million copies in a single week. The album would spend a total of twenty cumulative weeks atop the Billboard 200, marking the first time a female artist had accumulated that many weeks at number one, including thirteen consecutive weeks at the summit, which became the second most consecutive weeks by a female artist, succeeded only by Carole King's Tapestry. In addition, Houston set another chart record when she spent the most cumulative weeks simultaneously on both the Billboard 200 and Billboard Hot 100 with The Bodyguard and "I Will Always Love You" spending twelve consecutive weeks at number one on the respective charts. By June 1993, the album had already sold over 26 million copies worldwide, becoming one of the fastest-selling albums in music history, and being certified diamond by the Recording Industry Association of America (RIAA) on November 3, 1993, less than a year after its release, becoming the first album by a female artist to go diamond for sales of ten million copies by the RIAA, eventually selling 19 million copies alone in the country.

In addition, after debuting at number two, the album also topped the Top R&B/Hip-Hop Albums chart in its second week and would go on to stay atop that chart for eight consecutive weeks, matching her run on the chart with her previous effort, I'm Your Baby Tonight (1990). On the Billboard 200, the album would spend 42 of its weeks inside the top ten, her second most weeks inside the top ten after Whitney Houston (1985), which spent 48 weeks inside the top ten during its run. It would eventually spend 155 cumulative weeks on the Billboard 200 and 122 weeks on the Top R&B/Hip-Hop Albums chart, marking the second time in the chart's history that a female artist had spent 100 or more weeks on the chart, followed by Houston's 1985 debut, which spent 116 weeks. It held a 19-year chart record as the female album with the most weeks at number one until singer Adele broke it with her album, 21, which went on to spend 24 weeks at number one. As of 2025, Houston and Adele remain the only female artists to have an album register at number one on the chart for twenty or more weeks. Due to its success on Billboard, the soundtrack was ranked the top album on the Billboard Year-End pop and R&B album lists, marking the second time Houston accomplished this since her debut, Whitney Houston, had done it in 1986. It was also the first album in Nielsen SoundScan history to rank among the top three albums in two consecutive years, ranking at number three in 1992 and number one for 1993, and the best-selling soundtrack by the National Association of Recording Merchandisers (NARM) in 1993–1994. After the soundtrack was credited as a Whitney Houston album in Billboard's archives, Houston became the only artist of the Billboard 200 era with three albums to remain atop the chart for over eleven weeks ㅡWhitney Houston (14 weeks), Whitney (11 weeks) and The Bodyguard (20 weeks). Houston also broke the record for the most cumulative weeks at number one by a female artist with 46 cumulative weeks until Taylor Swift surpassed it in 2020 with her album Folklore. It also set an RIAA sales record for receiving the largest initial certification of any album at six-times platinum on January 18, 1993. The record was later broken by *NSYNC's No Strings Attached, certified 7× Platinum initially in April 2000. When the RIAA launched the Diamond Awards on March 16, 1999, The Bodyguard joined it along with 62 other albums. It is the first album to reach both the 10 million and 11 million sales mark in the US since 1991, when Nielsen SoundScan started tracking music sales. As of late 2014, it had sold 12,140,000 copies; it is the sixth best-selling album of the SoundScan era in the United States.

The Bodyguard became an international smash, going to number one in 20 other countries, including Australia for five weeks, Austria for nine weeks, Canada for 12 weeks, France for eight weeks, Germany for 11 weeks, Hungary for two weeks, Italy for two weeks, Japan for two weeks, Netherlands for six weeks, New Zealand for eight weeks, Norway for six weeks, Sweden for four weeks and Switzerland for nine weeks. In the United Kingdom, the album didn't chart on the main albums chart because compilation albums were excluded from the main albums chart from January 1989. Instead, the album reached the top on the official compilation albums chart and stayed there for 11 weeks, spending 60 non-consecutive weeks in the top 10 and for a total of 107 weeks on the chart. Through its massive success across Europe, it topped the European Top 100 Albums chart for 15 non-consecutive weeks. In the UK, the album was certified 7× platinum by the British Phonographic Industry (BPI) on January 1, 1994, and has sold 2,255,000 copies, landing at number sixty on the list of UK's 100 best-selling albums of all time. In Japan, it was certified 2× million by the Recording Industry Association of Japan (RIAJ) in 1994, the first time a foreign artist achieved that feat in Japanese music history, and eventually became the best-selling foreign album with 2.8 million copies sold. The record was later broken by Mariah Carey's #1's, certified 3× million in 1998. In Germany, the album has sold more than 1.7 million, earning 3× platinum awards by the Bundesverband Musikindustrie (BVMI). In addition, it was awarded Diamond for the sales of over 1 million in both France and Canada. It was certified 3× platinum in Brazil, becoming one of the best-selling international album by a female artist and set a record for the best-selling foreign album with the sales of 1.2 million over in South Korea. In Australia, it became the best selling album of 1993. In Mexico, the soundtrack sold more than 500,000 copies, making it the best-selling English-language record in 1994. To date, the album has sold 45 million copies worldwide, making it the best-selling soundtrack of all time, the best-selling album by a female artist ever and the best-selling album of the 1990s.

== Legacy and accolades ==
=== Impact ===
The film and its accompanying soundtrack changed the direction of Houston's career. Though already a well-established superstar by the time of its release, the film and its soundtrack cemented her as a global megastar. Gail Mitchell, Billboard senior correspondent, stated, "plain and simple, The Bodyguard's unparalleled success cemented Whitney Houston's status in the firmament of iconic female singers," adding that the film sparked Houston's "second career as an actress — a transition that only a few singers have seamlessly accomplished." British biographer Richard Seal in his book on Houston, One Moment in Time: The Life of Whitney Houston, wrote that she "entered and seemingly effortlessly succeeded in that notorious graveyard for rock star legends, the film business" following the success of the film. The Bodyguard spent 42 weeks inside the top ten of the Billboard 200, the fifth most weeks a soundtrack album has spent inside the top ten in chart history.

In later years, the soundtrack has been regarded as one of the best albums of all time. The Ringer ranked it the seventh best movie soundtrack of the past 50 years in 2021. On Pitchfork's 2022 list of its 150 Greatest Albums of the 1990s, the Houston soundtrack was listed at number 147, crediting Houston for influencing future stars such as Christina Aguilera and Ariana Grande. In 2023, the A.V. Club listed it as the 12th best movie soundtrack of all time. That same year, Cosmopolitan ranked it as the 38th best movie soundtrack of all time, while The Independent ranked it 35th place in its best top 40 film soundtracks. In 2024, it was listed among the 101 Greatest Soundtracks of All Time on Rolling Stone. A year later, in 2025, Entertainment Weekly listed it as one of the best film soundtracks of the 1990s. That same year, Classic Pop included the soundtrack as one of the 40 best pop soundtracks of all time.

The lead single "I Will Always Love You" is often recognized in all-time rankings. In 2001, the National Endowment for the Arts in collaboration with the Recording Industry Association of America listed the song at number 108 in its list of 365 songs of the 20th century. In 2004, the American Film Institute ranked it 65th place in its top 100 songs in American cinema of the 20th century. Rod Couch listed it as the top of his book ranking The Top 500 Songs of the Rock Era: 1955-2015. The song was inducted into the Grammy Hall of Fame in 2018, then selected by the Library of Congress in 2019 for preservation in the National Recording Registry. In 2021, Rolling Stone ranked the song 94th on its 500 Greatest Songs of All Time list. Billboard listed it as the 60th best pop song of all time in its 2023 ranking. Houston's other singles from the soundtrack, including "I'm Every Woman" and "I Have Nothing" have also been included in best-of lists, with "I Have Nothing", in particular, becoming the most covered tune by any artist on the talent show, American Idol, with fourteen covers. Singers Britney Spears and Jessica Simpson later performed the song during record label auditions, successfully earning record deals, while Christina Aguilera earned her record deal after performing "Run to You" for executives for RCA Records. At the 2021 funeral for American rapper DMX, Houston's "Jesus Loves Me" from the soundtrack was among the songs played.

=== Awards and accolades ===
Both The Bodyguard soundtrack and its singles received many accolades following its release. At the 65th Academy Awards in 1993, both "I Have Nothing" and "Run to You" received nominations for Best Original Song for its songwriters. At the 36th Annual Grammy Awards, the soundtrack received six nominations including four alone for Houston, who won three, including Best Female Pop Vocal Performance and Record of the Year for "I Will Always Love You", while winning Album of the Year for The Bodyguard, which made Houston just the second black female artist in Grammy history to win the coveted award. In addition, as a producer, Houston became the first black female producer to win in the category. To this day, The Bodyguard remains the only soundtrack album in history to have the soundtrack and one of its songs win the two top Grammy Awards.

At the 1994 American Music Awards, Houston won a staggering seven awards for the soundtrack including Favorite Pop/Rock Album, an additional eighth American Music Award for Award of Merit earned Houston a record for the most AMAs won by a woman, tying overall with Michael Jackson. Houston received 11 Billboard Music Awards in 1993, including Top Billboard 200 Album for The Bodyguard. Internationally, Houston won five World Music Awards, six Japan Gold Disc Awards, a Juno Award for International Album of the Year and a Brit Award for Soundtrack/Cast Recording.

=== I Wish You Love: More from The Bodyguard ===
I Wish You Love: More from the Bodyguard is the 25th anniversary reissue of the album, released by Legacy Recordings on November 17, 2017. The album was released to commemorate the 25th anniversary of the movie, The Bodyguard, which marked Houston's film debut. It includes the film versions of her six Bodyguard contributions – "I Will Always Love You", "I Have Nothing", "I'm Every Woman", "Run to You", "Queen of the Night" and "Jesus Loves Me" – as well as remixes and live performances of the songs from subsequent tours. The album's release coincided with a tribute to Houston and the music of The Bodyguard at the American Music Awards on November 19 on ABC as performed by Christina Aguilera. Ahead of the performance, Aguilera wrote on Instagram, "I am excited, honored and humbled to perform a tribute to one of my idols."

== Track listing ==
All songs performed by Whitney Houston, except where noted.

The Bodyguard – Standard edition
No.	Title	Writer(s)	Length
1.	"I Will Always Love You"	Dolly Parton	4:31
2.	"I Have Nothing"	David Foster; Linda Thompson	4:49
3.	"I'm Every Woman"	Nickolas Ashford; Valerie Simpson	4:45
4.	"Run to You"	Allan Rich; Jud Friedman	4:24
5.	"Queen of the Night"	Houston; L.A. Reid; Kenneth "Babyface" Edmonds; Daryl Simmons	3:08
6.	"Jesus Loves Me"	Anna Bartlett Warner; William Batchelder Bradbury	5:12
7.	"Even If My Heart Would Break" (Kenny G and Aaron Neville)	Franne Golde; Adrian Gurvitz	4:58
8.	"Someday (I'm Coming Back)" (Lisa Stansfield)	Stansfield; Andy Morris; Ian Devaney	4:57
9.	"It's Gonna Be a Lovely Day" (The S.O.U.L. S.Y.S.T.E.M. featuring Michelle Visage)	Bill Withers; Skip Scarborough; Robert Clivillés; David Cole; Tommy Never; Visage	4:47
10.	"(What's So Funny 'Bout) Peace, Love, and Understanding" (Curtis Stigers)	Nick Lowe	4:04
11.	"Waiting for You" (Kenny G)	Kenny G	4:58
12.	"Trust in Me" (Joe Cocker featuring Sass Jordan)	Charlie Midnight; Marc Swersky; Francesca Beghe	4:12
13.	"Theme from The Bodyguard" (Alan Silvestri)	Alan Silvestri	2:40
Total length:			57:44

The Bodyguard – German special edition (bonus tracks)
No.	Title	Writer(s)	Producer(s)	Length
14.	"I'm Every Woman" (Clivillés & Cole House Mix)	Nickolas Ashford; Valerie Simpson	Walden; Clivillés; Cole	10:37
15.	"Queen of the Night" (CJ's Master Mix)	Antonio "L.A. Reid"; Kenneth "Babyface" Edmonds; Daryl Simmons; Houston	Reid; Babyface	6:35
Total length:				74:56

Notes

- On the US edition, Kenny G's "Waiting for You" was not included, with Alan Silvestri's "Theme from The Bodyguard" appearing in its place (before Joe Cocker feat. Sass Jordan's "Trust in Me")

== Personnel ==
"I Will Always Love You"

- Whitney Houston – vocals, vocal arrangement
- David Foster – producer, arranger
- Rickey Minor – director
- Kirk Whalum – tenor saxophone (with solo)
- Ricky Lawson – drums
- Bashiri Johnson – percussion
- David Foster – keyboard; Roland JD-800 (possibly)
- Ray Fuller, Dean Parks & Michael Landau – guitars
- Neil Stubenhaus – bass
- Tony Smith & Claude Gaudette – synth programming
- Bill Schnee, Dave Reitzas & Peter J. Yianilos – recording engineers
- Dave Reitzas – mixing engineer
- Hal Belknap – assistant mixing engineer

"I Have Nothing"

- Whitney Houston – vocals, vocal arrangement
- Jeremy Lubbock – string arrangement
- David Foster – keyboards, bass, string arrangement, producer, arranger
- Michael Landau – guitar
- Simon Franglen – Synclavier and synth programming
- Dave Reitzas – recording engineer
- Mick Guzauski – mixing engineer

"I'm Every Woman"

- Whitney Houston – vocals
- Narada Michael Walden – producer
- Robert Clivilles – additional vocal arrangement and production, remix
- David Cole – additional vocal arrangement and production, remix
- Vocal arrangement inspired by Chaka Khan
- Bashiri Johnson – percussion
- Louis Biancaniello – programming
- James Alfano – programming
- Chauncey Mahan – programming
- Matt Rohr – recording engineer
- Marc Reyburn – recording engineer
- Acar S. Key – additional production recording engineer
- Bob Rosa – mixing engineer

"Run to You"

- Whitney Houston – vocals, vocal arrangement
- David Foster – producer, arrangement, string arrangement, bass
- Jud Friedman – arrangement, keyboards
- William Ross – string arrangement
- John Robinson – drums
- Dean Parks – acoustic guitar
- Simon Franglen – Synclavier and synth programming
- Dave Reitzas – recording engineer
- Mick Guzauski – mixing engineer

"Queen of the Night"

- Whitney Houston – vocals, co-producer, vocal arrangement
- L.A. Reid – producer, drum programming
- Babyface – producer, keyboard, organ, bass and drum programming
- Daryl Simmons – co-producer
- Kayo – bass
- Donald Parks – programming
- Randy Walker – programming
- Vernon Reid – guitar solo
- Barney Perkins – recording engineer
- Milton Chan – recording engineer
- Dave Way – mixing engineer
- Jim "Z" Zumpano – mixing engineer

"Jesus Loves Me"

- Whitney Houston – vocals, producer, vocal arrangement
- BeBe Winans – vocals, background vocals
- Cedric J. Caldwell – arrangement
- BeBe Winans – vocal arrangement, arrangement
- Ron Huff – string arrangement
- Richard Joseph – additional production recording engineer
- Alvin Chea – background vocals
- Claude McKnight III – background vocals
- Paul Jackson Jr. – guitar
- Victor Caldwell – bass, drum programming, recording engineer
- Mike McCarthy – recording engineer
- Dave Reitzas – mixing engineer

"Even If My Heart Would Break"

- Kenny G – performer, arrangement
- Aaron Neville – performer
- David Foster – producer, arranger
- Walter Afanasieff – producer, piano, drum programming, bass and organ
- Randy Kerber – keyboards
- John Robinson – drums
- Michael Thompson – guitar
- Ren Klyce – synth programming
- Gary Cirimelli – synth programming
- Humberto Gatica – recording engineer
- Manny LaCarrubba – additional engineering
- Dana Jon Chappelle – additional engineering
- Steve Sheppard – additional engineering
- Kevin Becka – additional engineering, assistant engineer
- Steve Sheppard – assistant engineer
- Mick Guzauski – mixing engineer

"Someday (I'm Coming Back)"

- Lisa Stansfield – vocals
- Ian Devaney – producer, mixing
- Andy Morris – producer, mixing
- Jazz Summers – executive producer
- Tim Parry – executive producer
- Bobby Boughton – engineer, mixing

"It's Gonna Be a Lovely Day"

- The S.O.U.L. S.Y.S.T.E.M. – performer
- Michelle Visage – featured artist
- Robert Clivilles – producer, arranger, mixing, rap vocal production
- David Cole – producer, arranger, mixing, vocal arrangement
- Ricky Crespo – assistant producer
- Duran Ramos – rap vocal production
- Acar S. Key – recording and mixing engineer
- Bruce Miller – additional mixing

"(What's So Funny 'Bout) Peace, Love and Understanding?"

- Curtis Stigers – performer
- Danny Kortchmar – producer
- Marc DeSisto – recording and mix engineer

"Theme from The Bodyguard"

- Alan Silvestri – composer, producer
- William Ross – orchestrations
- Gary Grant – trumpet solo
- Dennis Sands – engineer
- Bill Easystone – assistant engineer
- Gary Carlson – technical engineer
- Jim Walker – technical engineer

"Trust in Me"

- Joe Cocker – vocals
- Sass Jordan – featured artist
- Charlie Midnight – producer
- John Rollo – recording engineer
- Chris Lord-Alge – mixing engineer

=== Production and design ===
- Clive Davis – executive producer
- Whitney Houston – executive producer
- Roy Lott – producer
- Gary LeMel – Warner Bros. music executive
- Maureen Crowe – music supervisor
- George Marino – mastering
- Susan Mendola – design
- Ben Glass – The Bodyguard still photography, inside front cover photo of Whitney Houston
- Randee St. Nicholas – inside booklet photography of Whitney Houston
- Ellin LaVar – hair
- Quietfire – makeup
- Stephen Earabino – styling
- Matthew Rolston – photography (Kenny G)
- Casado – photography (Aaron Neville)
- Paul Cox – photography (Joe Cocker)
- Moshe Brakha – photography (Sass Jordan)
- Zanna – photography (Lisa Stansfield)
- Ken Nahoum – photography (The S.O.U.L. S.Y.S.T.E.M.)
- Terence Scott – photography (Curtis Stigers)

== Charts ==
=== Weekly charts ===
1992–1993 weekly chart performance for The Bodyguard: Original Soundtrack Album
Chart (1992–1993)	Peak position
Australian Albums (ARIA)	1
Austrian Albums (Ö3 Austria)	1
Belgian Albums (IFPI)	1
Canada Top Albums/CDs (RPM)	1
Danish Albums (IFPI Danmark)	1
Dutch Albums (Album Top 100)	1
European Top 100 Albums (Music & Media)	1
Finnish Albums (Musiikkituottajat)	1
French Albums (SNEP)	1
German Albums (Offizielle Top 100)	1
Greek Albums (IFPI Greece)	1
Hungarian Albums (MAHASZ)	1
Icelandic Albums (Tónlist)	1
Irish Albums (IFPI)	2
Italian Albums (Musica e dischi)	1
Japanese Albums (Oricon)	1
New Zealand Albums (RMNZ)	1
Norwegian Albums (VG-lista)	1
Portuguese Albums (AFP)	1
Spanish Albums (PROMUSICAE)	1
Swedish Albums (Sverigetopplistan)	1
Swiss Albums (Schweizer Hitparade)	1
UK Compilation Albums (Music Week)	1
US Billboard 200	1
US Top R&B/Hip-Hop Albums (Billboard)	1

1995–1996 weekly chart performance for The Bodyguard: Original Soundtrack Album
Chart (1995–1996)	Peak position
Belgian Albums (Ultratop Flanders)	20
French Albums (SNEP)	50
Dutch Albums (Album Top 100)	18
New Zealand Albums (RMNZ)	43
US Billboard 200	86
US Top R&B/Hip-Hop Albums (Billboard)	48

1999 weekly chart performance for The Bodyguard: Original Soundtrack Album
Chart (1999)	Peak position
Scottish Albums (Official Charts)	79
UK Compilation Albums (Official Charts)	24
UK R&B Albums (Official Charts)	11

2001 weekly chart performance for The Bodyguard: Original Soundtrack Album
Chart (2001)	Peak position
French Albums (SNEP)	62
UK Compilation Albums (Official Charts)	18

2005 weekly chart performance for The Bodyguard: Original Soundtrack Album
Chart (2005)	Peak position
Spanish Albums (Promusicae)	25
UK Soundtrack Albums (Official Charts)	14

2012 weekly chart performance for The Bodyguard: Original Soundtrack Album
Chart (2012)	Peak position
Australian Albums (ARIA)	28
Austrian Albums (Ö3 Austria)	22
French Albums (SNEP)	10
German Albums (Offizielle Top 100)	41
Greek Albums (IFPI Greece)	56
Italian Albums (FIMI)	33
South Korean Albums (Circle)	98
Swiss Albums (Schweizer Hitparade)	43
UK Album Downloads (Official Charts)	43
UK R&B Albums (Official Charts)	7
UK Soundtrack Albums (Official Charts)	1
US Billboard 200	5
US Soundtrack Albums (Billboard)	1

2022 weekly chart performance for The Bodyguard: Original Soundtrack Album
Chart (2022)	Peak position
Belgian Albums (Ultratop Wallonia)	100
Spanish Albums (Promusicae)	88
UK Compilation Albums (Official Charts)	45
UK R&B Albums (Official Charts)	6
UK Soundtrack Albums (Official Charts)	8

2025 weekly chart performance for The Bodyguard: Original Soundtrack Album
Chart (2025)	Peak position
Taiwanese Western Albums (G-Music)	18
UK Compilation Albums (Official Charts)	68
UK R&B Albums (Official Charts)	20
UK Soundtrack Albums (Official Charts)	4

=== Year-end charts ===
1992 year-end chart performance for The Bodyguard: Original Soundtrack Album
Chart (1992)	Position
Canada Top Albums/CDs (RPM)	52

1993 year-end chart performance for The Bodyguard: Original Soundtrack Album
Chart (1993)	Position
Australian Albums (ARIA)	1
Austrian Albums (Ö3 Austria)	1
Canada Top Albums/CDs (RPM)	3
Dutch Albums (Album Top 100)	1
European Top 100 Albums (Music & Media)	1
German Albums (Offizielle Top 100)	1
Japanese Albums (Oricon)	3
New Zealand Albums (RMNZ)	4
Swiss Albums (Schweizer Hitparade)	4
UK Compilation Albums (Music Week)	1
US Billboard 200	1
US Top R&B Albums (Billboard)	1
US Top Soundtrack Albums (Billboard)	1

1994 year-end chart performance for The Bodyguard: Original Soundtrack Album
Chart (1994)	Position
Australian Albums (ARIA)	63
Dutch Albums (Album Top 100)	42
European Top 100 Albums (Music & Media)	99
French Albums (SNEP)	23
Japanese Albums (Oricon)	79
UK Compilation Albums (Music Week)	30
US Billboard 200	27
US Top R&B Albums (Billboard)	30
US Top Soundtrack Albums (Billboard)	2

1995 year-end chart performance for The Bodyguard: Original Soundtrack Album
Chart (1995)	Position
Belgian Albums (Ultratop Wallonia)	77
Dutch Albums (Album Top 100)	99
US Billboard 200	159

2012 year-end chart performance for The Bodyguard: Original Soundtrack Album
Chart (2012)	Position
US Billboard 200	147
US Soundtrack Albums (Billboard)	7

=== Decade-end charts ===
1990–1999 decade-end chart performance for The Bodyguard: Original Soundtrack Album
Chart (1990–1999)	Position
US Billboard 200	2

=== All-time charts ===
All-time chart performance for The Bodyguard: Original Soundtrack Album
Chart	Position
US Billboard 200	23
US Billboard 200 (Women)	13

== Certifications and sales ==
Region	Certification	Certified units/sales
Argentina (CAPIF)	4× Platinum	240,000^{^}
Australia (ARIA)	5× Platinum	350,000^{^}
Austria (IFPI Austria)	4× Platinum	200,000^{*}
Belgium (BRMA)	4× Platinum	200,000^{*}
Brazil (Pro-Música Brasil)	3× Platinum	750,000^{*}
Canada (Music Canada)	Diamond	1,000,000^{^}
Chile	—	100,000
Denmark (IFPI Danmark)	2× Platinum	160,000^{^}
Finland (Musiikkituottajat)	Platinum	56,486
France (SNEP)	Diamond	1,300,000
Germany (BVMI)	3× Platinum	1,700,000
Indonesia	—	320,000
Italy 1992-1999 sales	—	1,000,000
Italy (FIMI) sales since 2009	Gold	25,000^{‡}
Japan (RIAJ)	2× Million	2,800,000
Mexico	—	500,000
Netherlands (NVPI)	Platinum	600,000
New Zealand (RMNZ)	Platinum	15,000^{^}
Norway (IFPI Norway)	4× Platinum	200,000^{*}
Poland (ZPAV)	Gold	50,000^{*}
Singapore (RIAS)	6× Platinum	90,000
South Africa	—	110,000
South Korea	—	1,200,000
Spain (Promusicae)	6× Platinum	600,000^{^}
Sweden (GLF)	Platinum	343,000
Switzerland (IFPI Switzerland)	5× Platinum	250,000^{^}
Taiwan	—	305,000
United Kingdom (BPI)	7× Platinum	2,255,000
United States (RIAA)	19× Platinum	19,000,000^{‡}
Summaries
Europe (Music & Media)	—	7,000,000
Worldwide	—	50,000,000
^{*} Sales figures based on certification alone.^{^} Shipments figures based on certification alone.^{‡} Sales+streaming figures based on certification alone.

== See also ==
- List of accolades received by The Bodyguard (1992 film)
- List of Top 25 albums for 1993 in Australia
- List of best-selling albums
- List of best-selling albums by women
- List of best-selling albums in Europe
- List of best-selling albums in Brazil
- List of best-selling albums in Chile
- List of best-selling albums in France
- List of best-selling albums in Germany
- List of best-selling albums in Indonesia
- List of best-selling albums in Italy
- List of best-selling albums in Japan
- List of best-selling albums in South Korea
- List of best-selling albums in Taiwan
- List of best-selling albums in the United Kingdom
- List of best-selling albums in the United States

== Bibliography ==
- Seal, Richard (1994). One Moment in Time: Whitney Houston. Britannia Press Publishing. ISBN 0-9519937-8-X.
