= Ben K. Green =

Ben K. Green (1912–1974) was an author who wrote about horses and the post-World War I American West. His books consist of anecdotes drawn from his own experiences in the Southwestern United States.

He was born in Cumby, Texas and raised in Weatherford, Texas. Before he was twenty years old he had successfully earned a living trading horses and mules and raising cattle and sheep. The common trading practice – "cheat or be cheated" – is reflected in his stories, told using the language and humor of the area and not excluding himself from either outcome.

He was persuaded to settle in Fort Stockton, Texas and practiced in the entire Trans-Pecos Region. A large part of his work involved identifying plants which grew in that alkali soil and contained substances poisonous to horses, cattle, sheep, and hogs (lechuguilla, yellow-weed, pinguey, locoweed).

== List of books ==
- Horse Tradin', New York: Alfred A. Knopf, 1967
- Some More Horse Tradin', Amazon, 2000
- The Village Horse Doctor West of the Pecos, New York: Alfred A. Knopf, 1971
- Wild Cow Tales
- A Thousand Miles of Mustangin', Northland Press
- Horse Tales
- The Color of Horses: A Scientific and Authoritative Identification of the Color of the Horse, Northland Press, 1974
- The Shield Mares, Encino Press, 1967
- " Horse Conformation as to soundness and performance ", Northland Press, 1969, revised 1988, ISBN 0-87358--135-0
