= Benjamin Greene =

Benjamin Greene may refer to:

- Benjamin Greene (brewer) (1780–1860), founder of the Greene King brewing business
- Benjamin Greene (politician) (1764–1837), American state legislator from Maine
- Benjamin Buck Greene (1808–1902), English financier and Bank of England governor
- Benjamin Franklin Greene (1817–1895), American engineering academic
- Benjamin Daniel Greene (1793–1862), American lawyer, medical doctor, naturalist, and botanist
- Ben Greene (1901–1978), British Labour Party activist and pacifist

== See also ==
- Benjamin Green (disambiguation)
