= Ben Green (musician) =

American singer-songwriter (born 1964)

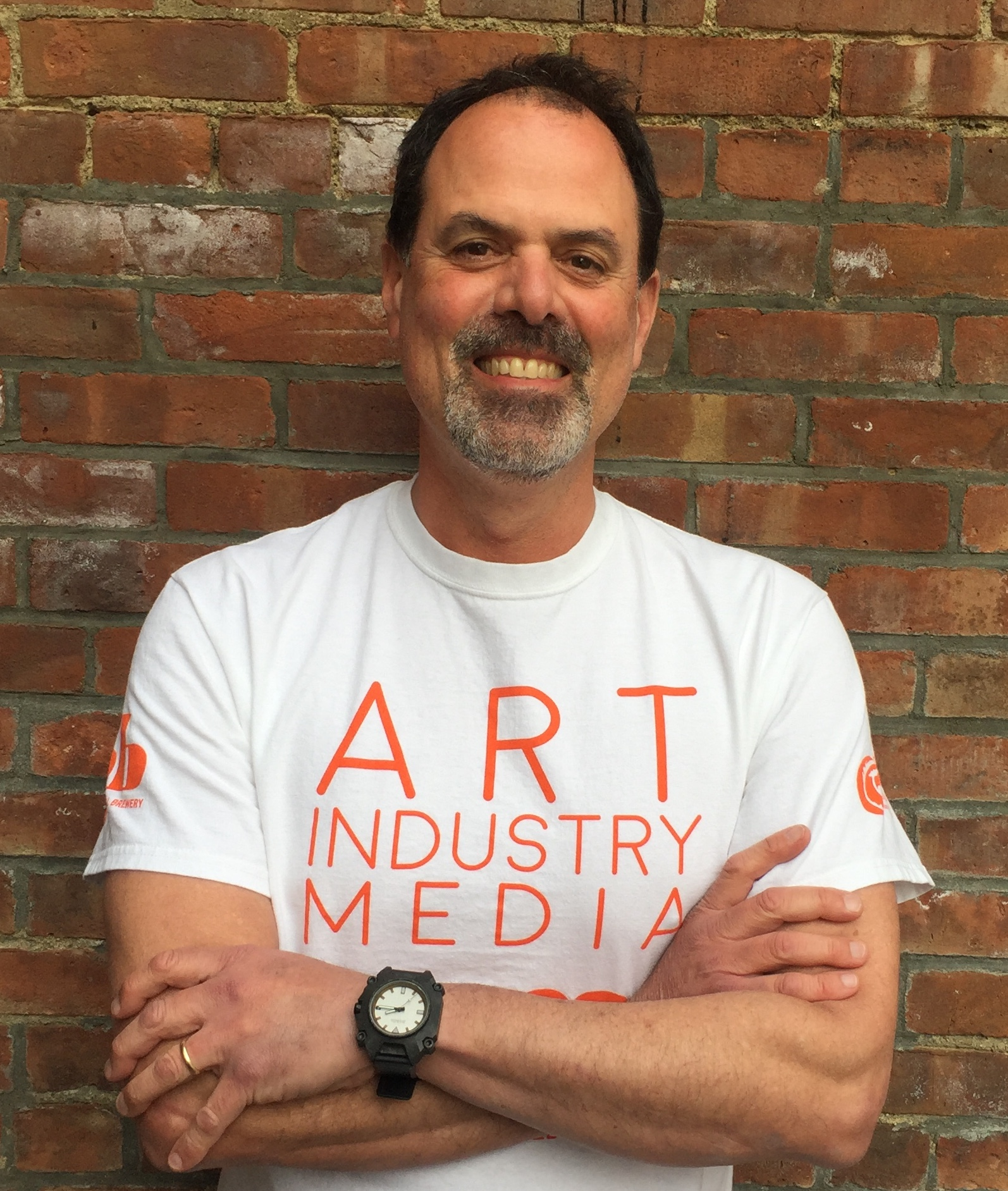
- Green in 2019

Background information
- Birth name: Benjamin Green
- Born: August 31, 1964 (age 61) New York City, New York City, U.S.
- Genres: Pop, rock
- Occupations: Singer-songwriter, musician, film director, entrepreneur
- Instruments: Guitar; piano; vocals
- Years active: 1990–present
- Labels: SBK; EMI Music Publishing
- Spouse: Francesca Beghe

Ben Green is an American singer-songwriter and musician best known for the charting success of "Two to One," which peaked at No. 27 in 2002, as well as being a film director, writer, and producer whose film short Pipe Dreams won the award for Best Showcase Short Film at the SOHO International Film festival in 2011. He is the owner and CEO of the Peekskill Clay Studio and the Peekskill Hat Factory, an 80,000-square-foot historic commercial building in Peekskill, New York.

== Music career ==
After graduating from Skidmore College with a BA, Green signed with EMI Music Publishing and its subsidiary SBK Records in 1990 and performed in the club scene in New York City. He released a self-titled record on Artemis Records in 2002; this yielded a Top 30 hit, "Two to One," which received favorable reviews. Green has shared the stage with Jim Brickman and The Bacon Brothers, among others.

His songs have been featured in various mediums including films such as the title track "The Finest Hour" for the film The Finest Hour starring Rob Lowe, as well as "Imaginary Lights" for the film Meet Me in Miami, a song that Green both wrote and performed. Other creative projects include writing and directing a short film, Pipe Dreams, featuring an ensemble cast including Debbie Harry; it was showcased at film festivals internationally and won the SOHO International Film Festival's award for Best Short Film in 2011.

- Charting Singles
- 2002 - "Two to One," peaked at #27 in R&R (magazine)'s Adult Contemporary Top 30 - August 23, 2002
- 2002 - "Two to One," earned a spot at #78 on the Adult Contemporary's Most Played Songs chart of 2002
- 2002 - "Without You," R&R (magazine)'s New & Active Chart, April 4, 2003
- Album Cuts
- 1994 - Buddy Miles - Nothing Left to Lose - Album :To Hell and Back.
- 1997 - Warren Hill - You're My Only Love - Album: Shelter

== Business career ==
In 1997, Green took stewardship of the Peekskill Hat Factory (est. 1882). Having once manufactured hats, the historic buildings had been converted to a mixed-use commercial industrial complex in the 1950s. After a sustained campaign of improvements and modernization, the Hat Factory is now home to a mix of commercial tenants, many of whom are in the creative arts industry, including the Peekskill Clay Studios, which Green founded in 2010. He has been an advocate for bringing art centers as a cultural component to Peekskill, New York. “Because the city of Peekskill invested so much in creating an artist community, there's now a uniquely concentrated and qualified creative workforce,” Green said. “That's important. That means businesses can come in here, come up here to Peekskill, and tap into this foundation that's already laid before.” Green is also the founder and former chair of Art Industry Media (AIM).

== Early life ==
Green was born to parents George and Sheila (née Greenwald) Green, in New York City in 1964. His father is a cardiac surgeon, and his mother is a children's book author. Green began playing piano at the age of three and began writing songs when he was in his teens. While attending Skidmore College, he began playing in clubs and pursuing a career in music.

== Personal life ==
Green is married to singer-songwriter Francesca Beghe. They have one son, James, and reside in Garrison, New York.
