= Ben Green (composer) =

American-born music composer/producer

Ben Green is an American-born music composer/producer, who later moved to Israel where he signed with EMI Music Publishing Ltd.

He has worked with such artists as Maya Bouskilla, Elan Babylon, Miri Buchari, Michal Amdursky, Mirel Resnik, Alon DiLoco, Hagay Mizrahi, and co-wrote with Pini Aaronbayev Israel's 2005 entry to the Eurovision "HaSheket SheNish'ar" performed by Shiri Maimon which placed 4th. Other notable songs include "Rise" by Gabrielle, "Let u Go" in Bulgaria "Vseki Put Obikvam Te" Performed by Pop Idol winner Nevena Tsoneva and runner up Teodoro. In 2007, he wrote and produced with EMI hip-hop star Elan Babylon the album Adrenalin's "Edge To Edge".

He has worked with other notables including The Black Eyed Peas, Deborah Cox, Roy Young and contributed to the musical score of the movie "The Pledge" starring Jack Nicholson.
