= Yellow-weed =

Yellow-weed is a common name for several plants and may refer to:

- Ranunculus bulbosus, native to western Europe
- Reseda luteola, native to Europe and western Asia
- Solidago canadensis, native to North America
