= Superwoman (Where Were You When I Needed You) =

1972 single by Stevie Wonder

Single by Stevie Wonder

from the album Music of My Mind
- B-side: "I Love Every Little Thing About You"
- Released: April 25, 1972
- Recorded: 1972
- Genre: Progressive soul
- Length: 8:08 (album version); 3:29 (single version)
- Label: Tamla
- Songwriter: Stevie Wonder
- Producer: Stevie Wonder

Stevie Wonder singles chronology
"If You Really Love Me" (1971)	"Superwoman (Where Were You When I Needed You)" (1972)	"Keep on Running" (1972)

"Superwoman" (titled "Superwoman (Where Were You When I Needed You)" on the single release) is a 1972 soul song by Stevie Wonder. It is the second track on Wonder's Music of My Mind album, and was also released as the first single. In essence a two-part song, there is a coherence in that it tells a story of the singer's relationship with "Mary". The first part covers her desire to be a star, and to leave her old life behind to become a movie star. The second part—a reworking of "Never Dreamed You'd Leave in Summer" from his 1971 album, Where I'm Coming From—covers the narrator's wondering why she had not come back as soon as he had hoped.

The song, both in its sound and length, was a first for Wonder, who recorded it independently of Motown and with Music of My Mind entered what was later termed his "classic period". As on most of his material between 1972 and 1974, he was a virtual one-man band on the song, playing all instruments except for Buzz Feiten's jazzy guitar part. With the usage of the Moog and ARP modules of the T.O.N.T.O modular synthesizer, the song marked the beginning of the more electronic sound of Wonder's 1972–1974 albums.

The single version, a 3 1/2-minute edit which featured only the first part, reached a peak of number 33 on the Billboard Hot 100 chart. Cash Box wrote of the song: "Superwoman, superproduction, supersong, superhit: AM and FM, pop/soul and MOR."

== Personnel ==
Information is based on the album's liner notes.

- Stevie Wonder – lead and backing vocals, Rhodes piano, drums, Moog bass, T.O.N.T.O. synthesizer
- Malcolm Cecil – Moog synthesizer programming
- Robert Margouleff – Moog synthesizer programming
- Buzz Feiten – electric guitar

== Chart performance ==
Chart (1972)	Peak position
US Billboard Hot 100	33
US Billboard Best Selling Soul Singles	13

== Notable covers ==
- In 1997, soul vocalist Eric Benet covered the song in an arrangement by keyboardist George Duke which was featured on the soundtrack of US sitcom Living Single. Duke again covered the song from his 2005 album Duke.
- A live cover of the second part of the song, but titled only "Superwoman", was released on the 2004 Donny Hathaway album These Songs for You, Live!
- Eliane Elias included the song on her 2008 album Bossa Nova Stories.
- In 1978, producer Quincy Jones covered the song on his album Sounds...and Stuff Like That!! which featured Patti Austin on vocals*
- In 1989, the Brazilian Jazz-Funk group Azymuth covered the song on their album Tudo Bem with production and arrangements by the trio with Jota Moraes playing keyboards and synthesizers. https://www.allmusic.com/album/tudo-bem-mw0000200350
