= Golden Lady (song) =

Song by Stevie Wonder

from the album Innervisions
- Released: August 3, 1973
- Recorded: August 24, 1972
- Genre: Soul
- Length: 4:49 (Full-length version)
- Label: Tamla
- Songwriter(s): Stevie Wonder
- Producer(s): Stevie Wonder; Malcolm Cecil; Robert Margouleff

Official audio
- "Golden Lady" on YouTube

"Golden Lady" is a song by the American musician Stevie Wonder, released in 1973 on his album Innervisions. The love song, written by Stevie Wonder, contrasts with the other songs on the album that comment upon societal issues within America. Examples include his comments on drug addiction within the song "Too High" and his political commentary on US President Richard Nixon in "He's Misstra Know-It-All".

This song is influenced by the montuno style due to the chord progression and syncopated rhythms found within its chorus.

== Personnel ==
Information is based on the album's liner notes

- Stevie Wonder – lead vocal, piano, Fender Rhodes, drums, Moog bass, T.O.N.T.O. synthesizer
- Malcolm Cecil – synthesizer programming
- Robert Margouleff – synthesizer programming
- Larry "Nastyee" Latimer – congas
- Clarence Bell – Hammond organ
- Ralph Hammer – acoustic guitar

== Covers ==
- José Feliciano from the album And The Feeling's Good released in 1974.
- Kurt Elling from the album The Gate released in 2011.
- Robert Glasper from his 1 Mic 1 Take covers released in 2013.
- Bill Wurtz on his website under the Jazz section. Released in 2017.
- Yesterday's New Quintet from the album Stevie released in 2004.
