= Living for the City =

1973 single by Stevie Wonder

Single by Stevie Wonder

from the album Innervisions
- B-side: "Visions"
- Released: November 1973
- Recorded: December 5, 1972 – April 20, 1973
- Studio: Record Plant, New York City; Mediasound, New York City
- Genre: Soul; funk
- Length: 7:21 (album version); 3:41 (single version)
- Label: Tamla
- Songwriter: Stevie Wonder
- Producers: Stevie Wonder; Malcolm Cecil; Robert Margouleff

Stevie Wonder singles chronology
"Higher Ground" (1973)	"Living for the City" (1973)	"Don't You Worry 'Bout a Thing" (1974)

Audio video
- "Living for the City" on YouTube

"Living for the City" is a 1973 single by Stevie Wonder from his Innervisions album. It reached number 8 on the Billboard Hot 100 chart and number 1 on the R&B chart. Rolling Stone ranked the song number 104 on their 2004 list of the "500 Greatest Songs of All Time".

== Story and production ==
The song begins with a smart little boy who is born into a loving black family in Mississippi, where he grows up experiencing poverty and discrimination as he sees his very dedicated parents work hard for many long hours at very low pay as they struggle mightily to properly care for their children.

In a musical bridge (which actually contains no music and is instead a de facto video presentation generated by sound effects and spoken dialogue), he travels by bus to New York City (alluding to the Second Great Migration) in hopes of finding a new life. Upon arrival, the naïve young man is immediately accosted by a black drug dealer who offers him $5 to run across the street with a package. The drug dealer then disappears, and the police who were pursuing the fleeing drug dealer arrive to see the young man crossing the street with the package. The white police officers stop, frisk, and arrest the young man without telling him what crime he is suspected of committing. A white judge then informs the young man that the jury has found him guilty and sentences him to ten years in prison. A bigoted white prison guard then insultingly orders him to get into his jail cell and slams the cell door shut right behind him.

After this non-musical bridge, Wonder’s lyrics first emphasize the cruelty and inhumanity of this man’s life experience as he struggles to survive as an ex-convict left to wander the streets of New York City, homeless. Wonder then concludes the song with a direct and heartfelt lyrical plea to his listeners to make the world a better place.

The basic track (electric piano and Wonder's first vocal takes) was recorded on December 5, 1972. Moog bass was overdubbed the following day. Drums, harps, and Wonder's finalized vocals were recorded on December 8, 1972. The track was left untouched until April 20, 1973, when Stevie recorded backing vocals while either slowing down or speeding up the tape, in order to make his backing vocals sound either higher or lower respectively in comparison to his natural voice. Wonder played the majority of the instruments on the song and was assisted by Malcolm Cecil and Robert Margouleff for recording engineering and synthesizer programming. Tenley Williams, writing in Stevie Wonder (2002), feels it was "one of the first soul hits to include both a political message and ... sampling ... of the sounds of the streets – voices, buses, traffic, and sirens – mixed with the music recorded in the studio."

== Reception ==
Billboard described "Living for the City" as a "spectacular production of a country boy whose parents sacrifice themselves for him," and also praised the vocals and horn playing.

The song won two Grammy Awards: one at the 1974 Grammy Awards for Best Rhythm & Blues Song, and the second for Best Male R&B Vocal Performance at the 1975 Grammy Awards for Ray Charles' recording on his album Renaissance.

It reached number 8 on the Billboard Hot 100 chart and number 1 on the R&B chart. Rolling Stone ranked the song number 104 on their 2004 list of the "500 Greatest Songs of All Time". In June 2026, CBS News included the song in its list of the 250 essential American songs of the past 250 years, one of three Wonder songs to make the list.

== Personnel ==
- Stevie Wonder – lead vocal, background vocals, Fender Rhodes, drums, Moog bass, T.O.N.T.O. synthesizer, handclaps
- Malcolm Cecil – synthesizer programming
- Robert Margouleff – synthesizer programming
- Calvin Hardaway (Wonder's brother); Ira Tucker Jr.; a New York police officer; attorney Johanan Vigoda – other voices

== Chart performance ==
=== Weekly charts ===
Chart (1973–1974)	Peak position
Canada	17
German Singles Chart	20
New Zealand	18
UK	15
US Billboard Hot 100	8
US Billboard Hot Soul Singles	1
US Cash Box Top 100	6

=== Year-end charts ===
Chart (1974)	Rank
Canada	156
US Billboard Hot 100	45

== Cover versions ==
Singer and pianist Ray Charles covered "Living for the City" in 1975 on his album Renaissance.

Dance music artist Sylvester covered the song on his 11th studio album, Mutual Attraction (1986), his major label debut album. His version was released as the album's lead single and peaked at #2 on Billboard's Dance Club Play Chart.

English rock band Gillan covered the song, releasing it as a single from their 1982 album Magic, which reached No. 50 in the UK.
