= It's About Time (Tonto's Expanding Head Band album) =

Studio album by Tonto
- Released: 1974
- Genre: Electronic; experimental; psychedelic; progressive
- Length: 39:37
- Label: Polydor
- Producer: Malcolm Cecil; Robert Margouleff

Tonto chronology
Zero Time (1971)	It's About Time (1974)

It's About Time is the second and final album by British-American electronic music duo Tonto, previously known as Tonto's Expanding Head Band, released in 1974 by Polydor Records. The album is a showcase for TONTO (The Original New Timbral Orchestra), a multitimbral, polyphonic synthesizer built by the two members of the band, Malcolm Cecil and Robert Margouleff, as a developed version of the Moog III synth in 1969.

== Track listing ==
=== Side one: Face Up ===
1. "Beautiful You" – 5:44
2. "Tonto's Travels" – 8:25
3. "Nil Desperandum" – 5:50

=== Side two: Pyramid Suite: The Pharaoh's Journey From Death To Life ===
1. "The Boatman" – 5:06
2. "Building the Pyramid" – 3:40
3. "Journey To the West" – 8:28
4. "Forty-Nine Judges/Bird Flies Free" – 2:24

== Personnel ==
- Malcolm Cecil – composer, engineer, producer
- Michael Cembalo – guitar
- Joan Decola – mixing assistant
- Steve Gadd – drums
- Armand Habdurian – percussion
- Marlo Henderson – guitar
- Mike Hules – executive producer
- Robert Margouleff – composer, engineer, producer
- Reggie McBride – bass
- Joan Nielsen – illustrations, layout, lettering
- Tama Starr – art direction, associate producer
