= Don't You Worry 'bout a Thing =

1974 single by Stevie Wonder

Single by Stevie Wonder

from the album Innervisions
- B-side: "Blame It on the Sun"
- Released: March 5, 1974
- Recorded: August 22, 1972-May 25, 1973
- Studio: Record Plant, New York City; Mediasound, New York City
- Genre: Latin soul; jazz; pop
- Length: 4:44 (album version); 3:40 (single version)
- Label: Tamla
- Songwriter: Stevie Wonder
- Producers: Stevie Wonder; Malcolm Cecil; Robert Margouleff

Stevie Wonder singles chronology
"Living for the City" (1973)	"Don't You Worry 'bout a Thing" (1974)	"He's Misstra Know-It-All" (1974)

Audio video
- "Don't You Worry 'bout a Thing" (album version) on YouTube

"Don't You Worry 'bout a Thing" is a song by American singer-songwriter Stevie Wonder, released in March 1974 by Tamla Records as the third single from his sixteenth studio album, Innervisions (1973). It spent fifteen weeks on the US Billboard Hot 100, debuting at number 73 the week of April 6, 1974 and peaking at number 16 the week of June 1, 1974. It also reached number 10 on the Cash Box Top 100, and number two on the Billboard R&B chart. The song's lyrics convey a positive message, focusing on taking things in one's stride and accentuating the positive. In 1992, British band Incognito had a European hit with their cover of the song.

== Recording ==
Basic tracking for the song took place on August 22, 1972. In addition to a lead vocal, the instruments recorded were piano, Moog bass, shaker, cowbell, bongos, and other Latin percussion. Additional lead vocals were first recorded on April 24, 1973, with background vocals being added on May 25, 1973.

== Music and lyrics ==
The tune is in E♭ minor, starting with a Latin piano intro. The opening melody (the melisma on the word "thing") is reminiscent of Horace Silver's "Song for My Father".

The song features a spoken intro in which the narrator boasts to a woman about his worldwide travel ("I been to, you know, Paris, Beirut [...] Iraq, Iran, Eurasia") and his linguistic capabilities ("I speak very, very fluent Spanish – todo está bien chévere"). This Spanish sentence, meaning "Everything's cool", is softly repeated throughout the song.

It uses the "Sunny" chord progression.

== Reception ==
Describing the song for the "Stevie Wonder: 20 Essential Songs" feature in The Daily Telegraph, Chris Harvey said:

With its playful Latin-piano-and-street-jive intro ... and its uplifting, downward-spiralling chorus, "Don't You Worry 'bout a Thing" easily takes its place among the works of pure joy that the musical prodigy has effortlessly poured out throughout his career. Showcased on the 1973 Innervisions album that came from the period in which Wonder ... was experimenting with synthesized sounds with producer Robert Margouleff, it's a back-to-basics song (although it does feature a Moog bass, played by Wonder) that relies on the interplay of piano, percussion and that ecstatic voice. It sounds and feels like a burst of summer happiness.

Billboard said that the song is a "strong ballad with gentle arrangements". Cash Box called it an "interesting Latin flavored disk," going on to say that "the vocals are soft and perfectly accented by some fine piano by Stevie and great backing percussion." Record World said that "quasi-Spanish banter introduces a Latin-lilting [song]" in which "the feeling [Wonder] produced on 'You Are The Sunshine of My Life' goes uptempo and uptown."

== Charts ==
=== Weekly charts ===
Chart (1974)	Peak position
Canada (RPM)	13
Netherlands (Dutch Top 40)	22
Netherlands (Single Top 100)	19
US Billboard Hot 100	16
US Easy Listening (Billboard)	9
US Hot Soul Singles (Billboard)	2
US Cash Box Top 100	10

=== Year-end charts ===
Chart (1974)	Rank
Canada (RPM)	134
US Billboard Hot 100	88

== Certifications ==
Region	Certification	Certified units/sales
United Kingdom (BPI)	Silver	200,000^{‡}
^{‡} Sales+streaming figures based on certification alone.

== Personnel ==
Information is based on the album's liner notes

- Stevie Wonder - lead vocals, background vocals, piano, drums, Moog bass
- Malcolm Cecil - synthesizer programming
- Robert Margouleff - synthesizer programming
- Yusuf Roahman - shaker
- Sheila Wilkerson - bongos, Latin gourd

== Incognito version ==
"Don't You Worry 'bout a Thing"

Single by Incognito

from the album Tribes, Vibes and Scribes
- B-side: "Colibri"
- Released: May 25, 1992
- Genre: Acid jazz; soul; house
- Length: 5:17 (LP version); 4:09 (edit)
- Label: Talkin' Loud
- Songwriter: Stevie Wonder
- Producers: J.P. 'Bluey' Maunick; Richard Bull

Incognito singles chronology
"Always There" (1991)	"Don't You Worry 'bout a Thing" (1992)	"Change" (1992)

Music video
- "Don't You Worry 'bout a Thing" on YouTube

In 1992, British acid jazz band Incognito covered "Don't You Worry 'bout a Thing" on their third album, Tribes, Vibes and Scribes (1992). It was released in May 1992 by Talkin' Loud and features vocals by American jazz singer Maysa Leak. Producers were J.P. 'Bluey' Maunick and Richard Bull. The single became a hit in Europe and especially in the Netherlands, where it peaked at number six. Additionally, it was a top-20 hit in the United Kingdom, a top-30 hit in Belgium and a top-40 hit in Sweden. A music video was produced to promote the single. It features the band performing the song in a blue Triumph Herald 13/60 Convertible, while driving in the streets of London. Other scenes show them in a multistorey car park. A re-issue of the single was released in 2005.

=== Critical reception ===
Paula Edelstein from AllMusic complimented the song as a "killer cover". Another editor, David Jeffries, called it an "effervescent cover". Andy Beevers from Music Week described it as "Latin-tinged commercial jazz funk". Sam Wood from The Philadelphia Inquirer deemed it a "killer version" that "springs off this disc with flourishes of bright, brassy Miami Horns, a suncopated house-styled piano figure, and Maysa Leak's stunning voice." James Hamilton from the Record Mirror Dance Update, stated that Stevie Wonder's "brassily strutting 1974 US hit is here wailed by new girl Maysa".

=== Track listing ===
- 12" single, UK (1992)
1. "Don't You Worry 'bout a Thing" (LP Version) – 5:17
2. "Colibri" (Remix) – 5:39
3. "Don't You Worry 'bout a Thing" (Frankie Foncett Mix) – 6:38
4. "Don't You Worry 'bout a Thing" (Frankie Foncett Underground Instrumental Mix) – 5:35
- CD single, Europe (1992)
1. "Don't You Worry 'bout a Thing" (Edit) – 4:09
2. "Don't You Worry 'bout a Thing" (LP Version) – 5:18
3. "Colibri" (Remix) – 5:40
4. "Don't You Worry 'bout a Thing" (Frankie Foncett Mix) – 6:40

=== Charts ===
==== Weekly charts ====
Chart (1992)	Peak position
Australia (ARIA)	196
Belgium (Ultratop Flanders)	30
Europe (Eurochart Hot 100)	59
Europe (European Dance Radio)	6
Germany (Official German Charts)	46
Israel (Israeli Singles Chart)	23
Netherlands (Dutch Top 40)	6
Netherlands (Single Top 100)	6
Sweden (Sverigetopplistan)	40
UK Singles (OCC)	19
UK Airplay (Music Week)	7
UK Dance (Music Week)	5
UK Club Chart (Music Week)	4

==== Year-end charts ====
Chart (1992)	Position
UK Airplay (Music Week)	59
UK Club Chart (Music Week)	90

== Other cover versions ==
American singer Tori Kelly covered the song for the 2016 Illumination film Sing in which Tori's character Meena overcomes her stagefright to perform at Buster's show. The cover garnered acclaim.

John Legend covered the song for the 2005 film Hitch.
