= Superstition (song) =

1972 single by Stevie Wonder

Single by Stevie Wonder

from the album Talking Book
- B-side: "You've Got It Bad Girl"
- Released: November 1972
- Recorded: Summer 1972
- Studio: Electric Lady, New York City
- Genre: Funk; funk rock; pop; soul
- Length: 4:26 (album version); 4:07 (7" version)
- Label: Motown
- Songwriter: Stevie Wonder
- Producers: Stevie Wonder; Malcolm Cecil (add.); Robert Margouleff (add.)

Stevie Wonder singles chronology
"Keep on Running" (1972)	"Superstition" (1972)	"You Are the Sunshine of My Life" (1973)

Music video
- "Superstition" (Official Audio) on YouTube

"Superstition" is a song by American singer-songwriter Stevie Wonder. It was released in November 1972, as the lead single from his fifteenth studio album, Talking Book (1972), by Tamla. The lyrics describe popular superstitions and their negative effects.

"Superstition" reached number one in the U.S. Billboard Hot 100 in January 1973 and on the soul singles chart. It was Wonder's first number-one single since "Fingertips, Pt. 2" in 1963. It peaked at number eleven in the UK Singles Chart in February 1973. In November 2004, Rolling Stone ranked the song number 74 on its list of the 500 Greatest Songs of All Time. It was re-ranked number 73 on its 2010 list, and number 12 on its 2021 list. At the 16th Grammy Awards, the song earned Wonder two Grammys: "Best Rhythm & Blues Song" and "Best R&B Vocal Performance, Male". In 1998, the song was inducted into the Grammy Hall of Fame. In June 2026, CBS News included the song in its list of the 250 essential American songs of the past 250 years, one of three Wonder songs to make the list.

== Writing and recording ==
"Superstition"
A sample from "Superstition", the song contains a funk-oriented sound with a bassline and riff played by Wonder

In the early 1970s, Wonder was playing most of the instruments on his songs by himself. But he preferred to let other guitarists play on his records, and after he learned that Jeff Beck was an admirer of his, an agreement was quickly made for Beck to become involved in the sessions that became the Talking Book album, in return for Wonder writing him a song.

Between the album sessions, Beck came up with the opening drum beat. Wonder told Beck to keep playing while he improvised over top of it. He improvised most of the song, including the riff, on the spot. Beck and Wonder created a rough demo for the song that day.

For the recording, Wonder sang and performed the funky clavinet riff on a Hohner Clavinet model C. Co-producers Malcolm Cecil and Robert Margouleff programmed the Moog synthesizer bass, Steve Madaio played the trumpet, and Trevor Lawrence played the tenor saxophone. While Wonder is also credited for drums on the track, Cheap Trick drummer Bun E. Carlos has stated that Cozy Powell, the drummer of The Jeff Beck Group from 1970 to 1972, had intimated to him that the drum track used on the final version was actually his.

After finishing the song, Wonder decided that he would allow Beck to record "Superstition" as part of their agreement. Originally, the plan was for Beck to release his version of the song first, with his newly formed power trio Beck, Bogert & Appice. But after the trio's debut album was delayed and Motown CEO Berry Gordy predicted that "Superstition" would be a huge hit that would drive sales of Talking Book, Wonder released the song as the Talking Book lead single on October 24, 1972, months before Beck's version was issued in March 1973 on the Beck, Bogert & Appice album.

== Reception ==
Cash Box described it as "one of [Wonder's] most impressive releases to date" with an "accent...on funk." James Perone described the clavinet riff as "probably [Wonder's] most memorable" use of the minor pentatonic scale.

== Personnel ==
From the album's liner notes:

- Stevie Wonder – lead vocals, Hohner Clavinet, drums, Moog bass
- Malcolm Cecil – Moog synthesizer programming
- Robert Margouleff – Moog synthesizer programming
- Trevor Lawrence – tenor saxophone
- Steve Madaio – trumpet, horn arrangements

== Chart performance ==
"Superstition" debuted on the Billboard Hot 100 at number 82 on November 18, 1972. Ten weeks later, it topped the chart for the week of January 27, 1973, displacing "You're So Vain" by Carly Simon. It was Wonder's second number one single on the Billboard Hot 100 and his first since "Fingertips, Pt. 2" topped the chart in August 1963. The song would stay on the chart for 16 cumulative weeks.

On the November 25, 1972 issue of Billboard, the song debuted at number 28 on the Hot Soul Singles chart. Seven weeks later, on January 6, 1973, it topped the chart, becoming the first new number one R&B single of 1973, displacing "Me & Mrs. Jones" by Billy Paul off the top spot, staying there for three straight weeks. It was Wonder's sixth number one single on that chart.

== Charts ==
=== Weekly charts ===
Weekly chart performance for "Superstition"
Chart (1972–1973)	Peak position
Belgium (Ultratop 50 Flanders)	16
Belgium (Ultratop 50 Wallonia)	35
Canada Top Singles (RPM)	6
Germany (GfK)	21
Netherlands (Single Top 100)	10
Spain (AFE)	18
UK	11
US Billboard Hot 100	1
US Billboard R&B	1
US Billboard Adult Contemporary	38

=== Year-end charts ===
Year-end chart performance for "Superstition"
Chart (1973)	Rank
Canada	75
US Billboard Hot 100	26

== Certifications ==
Certifications for "Superstition"
Region	Certification	Certified units/sales
Denmark (IFPI Danmark)	Platinum	90,000^{‡}
Italy (FIMI)	Platinum	50,000^{‡}
New Zealand (RMNZ)	4× Platinum	120,000^{‡}
Spain (Promusicae)	Platinum	60,000^{‡}
United Kingdom (BPI)	4× Platinum	2,400,000^{‡}
^{‡} Sales+streaming figures based on certification alone.

== Other recorded versions ==
- In 1973, Stevie Wonder performed a live-in-the-studio version of "Superstition" on Sesame Street's episode 514. The recording was published on the 2003 collection Songs from the Street: 35 Years in Music.

== In popular culture ==
Wonder appeared in Bud Light commercials that debuted during Super Bowl XLVII in 2013. As part of the "It's only weird if it doesn't work" campaign, which showed superstitious fans acting compulsively in an effort to guide their teams to victory, Wonder appeared as a witch doctor in New Orleans, where the game took place. The fans perform superstitious acts to receive good luck charms from him. The instrumental intro of "Superstition", before Wonder's vocals kick in, plays throughout the commercials.

Sting and Stevie Wonder performed the song on January 30, 2025, at Intuit Dome in Inglewood, California, for FireAid to raise money for relief efforts for the January 2025 Southern California wildfires.

== See also ==
- List of Billboard Hot 100 number-one singles of 1973
