= Tama Starr =

American businesswoman and author

Tama Starr is an American businesswoman and author.

She is the president of Artkraft Strauss, located in Manhattan. Throughout the twentieth century, the company was the preeminent designer and creator of signs and displays in Times Square, and was also responsible for the annual midnight ball-lowering that signaled the arrival of the new year.

Starr is also known as a satirist and social commentator. Her work has appeared in the Wall Street Journal, Washington Post, Reader's Digest, Partisan Review, Reason Magazine, and elsewhere. She has published three books. She lives in New York City.

== Works ==
=== Books ===
| Year | Title | Publisher | Co-worker(s) |
|---|---|---|---|
| 1991 | The Natural Inferiority of Women: Outrageous Pronouncements by Misguided Males | Simon & Schuster | |
| 1994 | Eve's Revenge: Saints, Sinners and Stand-up Sisters on the Ultimate Extinction of Men | Harcourt Brace | |
| 1998 | Signs and Wonders: The Spectacular Marketing of America | Doubleday Currency | Edward Hayman |

=== Lyrics ===
| Year | Title | Album | Record label |
|---|---|---|---|
| 1971 | Riversong | Zero Time | Embryo |
| 1975 | Riversong | Tonto's Expanding Head Band | Atlantic |

== Selected articles ==
- The 7.63 Percent Solution: A small contractor learns affirmative action arithmetic - Reason Magazine
- Confessions of a "Woman-Owned Business" Owner: How I learned to love quotas - Reason Magazine
- April Frauds: Three manufactured holidays make fools of us all - Reason Magazine (Earth Day, Secretary's Day, Take Your Daughter to Work Day)
- The Sky Keeps Falling! - Wall Street Journal (Review of Max Page, The City's End)
