= Innervisions =

1973 studio album by Stevie Wonder

Studio album by Stevie Wonder
- Released: August 3, 1973
- Recorded: April 17, 1972 – May 25, 1973
- Studios: Record Plant (Los Angeles); Mediasound (New York City)
- Genres: Progressive soul; funk; soul; rock; jazz
- Length: 44:15
- Label: Tamla
- Producers: Stevie Wonder; Malcolm Cecil; Robert Margouleff

Stevie Wonder chronology
Talking Book (1972)	Innervisions (1973)	Fulfillingness' First Finale (1974)

Singles from Innervisions
- 1. "Higher Ground" Released: July 1973; 2. "Living for the City" Released: November 1973; 3. "Don't You Worry 'Bout a Thing" Released: March 1974; 4. "He's Misstra Know-It-All" Released: July 1974 (UK)

Innervisions is the sixteenth studio album by American singer, songwriter, and musician Stevie Wonder, released on August 3, 1973, by Tamla, a subsidiary of Motown Records. A landmark recording of Wonder's "classic period", the album has been regarded as completing his transition from the "Little Stevie Wonder" known for romantic ballads into a more musically mature, conscious, and grown-up artist.

On Innervisions, Wonder continued to experiment with the revolutionary T.O.N.T.O. (The Original New Timbral Orchestra) synthesizer system developed by Malcolm Cecil and Robert Margouleff. Wonder's previous two albums, 1972’s Music of My Mind and Talking Book, boosted his standing in the music industry, transforming him from a reliable hitmaker into a "master" of the new album format. Ahead of Innervisions, Cecil and Margouleff were pushing Wonder to shift his lyrical themes, allowing for political and metaphysical issues to be discussed in his music instead of primarily singing about romance. The album's second single, “Living for the City” is considered its centerpiece.

Innervisions peaked at number four on the Billboard Top LPs & Tape chart and number one on the Billboard Soul LPs chart. At the 16th Grammy Awards, it won Album of the Year and Best Engineered Non-Classical Recording, while "Living for the City" won Best R&B Song. The album is widely considered by fans, critics, and colleagues to be one of Wonder's finest works and one of the greatest albums of all time. It was ranked number 34 on Rolling Stone's list of "The 500 Greatest Albums of All Time" in 2020 and was inducted into the Grammy Hall of Fame in 1999. The album became hugely influential on the future sound of commercial soul and black music.

== Recording ==
As with many of Wonder's albums, the lyrics, composition, and production of Innervisions are almost entirely his own work, and he also played all, or virtually all, the instruments on many of the album's tracks. He made prominent use of synthesizers throughout the album.

The nine tracks of Innervisions encompass a wide range of themes and issues: from drug abuse in "Too High", through inequality and systemic racism in "Living for the City", to love in the ballads "All in Love Is Fair" and "Golden Lady". The album's closer, "He's Misstra Know-It-All", is thought by some to be a scathing attack on then-US President Richard Nixon, similar to Wonder's song "You Haven't Done Nothin'" from the following year. "Living for the City" was one of the first soul music songs to deal explicitly with systemic racism and to incorporate everyday sounds of the street, such as traffic, voices, and sirens, in with music recorded in the studio.

For Wonder's vocal on the final verse of "Living for the City", associate producers Margouleff and Cecil deliberately provoked him, repeatedly interrupting his takes, to draw out a gruff, angry vocal performance matching the song's narrative; Margouleff later said Wonder grew hoarse and upset with them, but that the tactic produced the take they wanted.

== Post-release car crash ==
On August 6, 1973, three days after the commercial release of Innervisions, Wonder played a concert in Greenville, South Carolina. Afterward, he fell asleep in the front seat of the car of his friend John Harris, who was snaking along a road just outside Durham, North Carolina behind a truck loaded high with logs. Suddenly, the trucker jammed on his brakes, and the two vehicles collided. Logs went flying, and one smashed through the windshield of Wonder's car and hit him in the forehead. He was bloodied and unconscious when he was pulled from the wrecked car, and lay in a coma caused by severe brain contusion for ten days.

It was Wonder's friend and tour director Ira Tucker who first elicited some response from him:

I remember when I got to the hospital in Winston-Salem...man, I couldn't even recognize him. His head was swollen up about five times normal size. And nobody could get through to him. I knew that he likes to listen to music really loud and I thought maybe if I shouted in his ear it might reach him. The doctor told me to go ahead and try, it couldn't hurt him. The first time I didn't get any response, but the next day I went back and I got right down in his ear and sang Higher Ground. His hand was resting on my arm and after awhile his fingers started going in time with the song. I said yeah! Yeeeeaaah! This dude is going to make it!

When Wonder regained consciousness, he discovered that he had lost his sense of smell (which he later largely recovered), and he was deeply afraid that he might have lost his musical abilities, too. Tucker said:

We brought one of his instruments—I think it was the clavinet—to the hospital. For a while, Stevie just looked at it, or didn't do anything with it. You could see he was afraid to touch it, because he didn't know if he still had it in him—he didn't know if he could still play. And then, when he finally did touch it—man, you could just see the happiness spreading all over him. I'll never forget that.

Wonder's climb back to health was long and slow. He had to take medication for a year, tired easily, and suffered severe headaches. The crash also changed his way of thinking, as his deep faith and spiritual vision made him doubt that it was "an accident". He stated: "You can never change anything that has already happened. Everything is the way it's supposed to be...Everything that ever happened to me is the way it is supposed to have been." In an interview with The New York Times, Wonder commented that "the accident opened my ears up to many things around me. Naturally, life is just more important to me now...and what I do with my life." He also said:

I would like to believe in reincarnation. I would like to believe that there is another life. I think that sometimes your consciousness can happen on this earth a second time around. For me, I wrote "Higher Ground" even before the accident. But something must have been telling me that something was going to happen to make me aware of a lot of things and to get myself together. This is like my second chance for life, to do something or to do more, and to value the fact that I am alive.

Confirming Wonder's belief in destiny, Michael Sembello, Wonder's lead guitarist at the time, said:

Well, I think he'd always had some awareness of the spiritual side of life. But the accident really brought it to the surface. Like now I know he really sees—and uses—every concert as the spiritual opportunity it is, to reach people... The accident made him recognize God, it changed him a lot. Sometimes he'd just drift off in conversation, he'd just...be some place else. He got really intense after the accident, his ESP got really strong.

Before the crash, Wonder had been scheduled to do a five-week, 20-city tour in March and April 1974. It was postponed, with the exception of one date in Madison Square Garden in late March. That concert began with Wonder pointing to his scarred forehead, looking up, grinning, and giving "thanks to God that I'm alive". 21,000 people in the crowd roared with applause, and, as a Post critic noted, "it was hard not to be thrilled."

== Critical reception ==
Retrospective professional reviews
Review scores
Source	Rating
AllMusic	5/5 stars
The Austin Chronicle	5/5 stars
Christgau's Record Guide	A
Encyclopedia of Popular Music	5/5 stars
The Great Rock Discography	10/10
Los Angeles Times	4/4 stars
MusicHound Rock	5/5
The New Rolling Stone Album Guide	5/5 stars
Pitchfork	10/10
Slant Magazine	5/5 stars

As with both Music of My Mind and Talking Book from the previous year, Innervisions was received warmly by music critics, many of whom praised Wonder's versatile musical skills. Billboard wrote that "the liner credits Stevie with playing all the instruments on seven of the nine tunes. So in essence this is a one-man band situation and it works. His skill on drums, piano, bass, and ARP synthesizers are outstanding, and all the tracks work within the thematic framework." (Two ARP synthesizers were incorporated into the T.O.N.T.O. system.) The New York Times said: "At the center of his music is the sound of what is real. ... Stevie identifies himself as a gang and a genius, producing, composing, arranging, singing and, on several tracks, playing all the accompanying instruments. ... Vocally, he remains inventive and unafraid, he sings all the things he hears: rock, folk and all forms of Black music. The sum total of these varying components is an awesome knowledge, consumed and then shared by an artist who is free enough to do both."

Many critics praised the variety of musical styles and themes present in the album. A reviewer from Playboy wrote: "Stevie Wonder's Innervisions is a beautiful fusion of the lyric and the didactic, telling us about the blind world that Stevie inhabits with a depth of musical insight that is awesome. It's a view that's basically optimistic, a constant search for the 'Higher Ground', but the path is full of snares: dope ('Too High'), lies ('Jesus Children of America') and the starkly rendered poison of the city ('Living for the City'). Wonder seems to say that all people delude themselves but have to be well to pay their dues and existentially accept the present. 'Today's not yesterday,/And all things have an ending' is the way he puts it in 'Visions,' the key tune of the album—pretty yet serious, harmonically vivid. There's a lot of varied music here—Latin, reggae, even a nod to Johnny Mathis ('All in Love is Fair')—but it's all Stevie, unmistakably."

Some reviewers were less enthusiastic. Jon Tiven from Circus argued that there was a lack of memorable material on the album: "Just when Stevie had some momentum going, he went and put together a concept album of homogeneous music and rather typical lyrics. Unlike his last two albums, there are no real low spots on this album, which I suppose is an improvement, but there are no songs on Innervisions which are truly outstanding either. There's no 'Superstition,' no 'I Believe (When I Fall in Love It Will Be Forever).' By constructing a solid ground from which to work, Stevie has lowered the ceiling, and put a damper on his talents."

Musicians also showed consummate respect for the achievements of the album, with Roberta Flack saying to Newsweek that "It's the most sensitive of our decade ... it has tapped the pulse of the people."

Innervisions won Grammy Awards for Album of the Year and Best Engineered Non-Classical Recording in 1974, while "Living for the City" won the Grammy for Best R&B Song.

== Commercial performance ==
Following Talking Book, which hit the top 5 of the Billboard albums chart in early 1973 and achieved steady sales throughout the rest of the year, Innervisions became another considerable hit on the charts for Wonder. It debuted on the Billboard albums chart on August 18, 1973, at number 85, then climbed to number 22, number 14, number nine, and number six, before reaching its peak position of number four on September 22. The album remained in the top 20 until June 22, 1974, and remained in the top 200 during the entire calendar year of 1974, falling off the Billboard albums chart week ending January 11, 1975. Innervisions was Wonder's second consecutive album to reach the top of the Billboard Black Albums chart, where it remained for two weeks. On the Cashbox chart, it reached number one near the end of 1973. In the UK, the album also found success, and became Wonder's first to reach the UK top 10, peaking at number eight.

"Don't You Worry 'Bout a Thing"
An audio sample of "Don't You Worry 'Bout a Thing"

Three hit singles were issued from the album. "Higher Ground", which was released several weeks before Innervisions, reached number four on the Billboard singles chart in late October 1973, and number one on the Cashbox singles chart. "Living for the City" reached number eight on the Billboard singles chart in early January 1974. These first two singles both reached number one on the Billboard Soul Singles chart. Finally, "Don't You Worry 'Bout a Thing", released in March 1974, reached number 16 in early June, and also peaked at number two on the Soul Singles chart. In the UK, "Higher Ground" and "Living for the City" were released as singles, but only achieved modest success, reaching numbers 29 and 15, respectively. Only the third single issued there, "He's Misstra Know-It-All", managed to reach the top 10, peaking at number eight on the UK Singles Chart.

"All in Love Is Fair" was a hit for Barbra Streisand when she recorded it and released it as a single in 1974.

== Legacy ==
Innervisions continued to attract critical praise after its initial chart run. The Washington Post critic Geoffrey Himes called it an exemplary release of the progressive soul development from 1968 to 1973. The album has been regarded as completing his transition from the "Little Stevie Wonder" known for romantic ballads into a more musically mature, conscious, and grown-up artist. In his Rock & Roll Review: A Guide to Good Rock on CD (1991), Bill Shapiro wrote: "This recording represents the pinnacle of a very important artist's career, and of his physically blind, but nonetheless extraordinary humane vision. ... The feel is a little more jazz than funk, the result is simply glorious pop music – uplifting sound and message."

The album has been included on many lists of the greatest albums of all time. It was voted number 143 in the third edition of Colin Larkin's All Time Top 1000 Albums (2000). In 2001, VH1 named the album the 31st-greatest album of all time, saying: "The whole message of this album seems to be caution – Wonder seems to be warning the black community to be aware of their own plight, strive for improvement, and take matters into their own hands. But this is all against the backdrop of the harsh social realities of America circa 1973, and nowhere does this conflict hit home more than in Wonder's magnum opus, 'Living for the City', a raw piece of modern blues on which Wonder played every instrument. The message of urban struggle resonates even more strongly now than it did thirty years ago, proving that the 'inner-visions' of this LP were visionary as well."

In 2003, the album was ranked number 23 on Rolling Stone magazine's list of the 500 greatest albums of all time; it was number 24 on the 2012 version of the list, and number 34 on the 2020 edition. The magazine wrote on the occasion of the initial list:

Stevie Wonder may be blind, but he reads the national landscape, particularly regarding black America, with penetrating insight on Innervisions, the peak of his 1972–73 run of albums–including Music of My Mind and Talking Book. Fusing social realism with spiritual idealism, Wonder brings expressive color and irresistible funk to his synth-based keyboards on "Too High" (a cautionary anti-drug song) and "Higher Ground" (which echoes Martin Luther King Jr.'s message of transcendence). The album's centerpiece is "Living for the City", a cinematic depiction of exploitation and injustice.

The album was re-released in the UK on September 15, 2008, to coincide with Wonder's autumn 2008 European tour.

== Track listing ==
All tracks are written by Stevie Wonder.

Side one
No.	Title	Length
1.	"Too High"	4:36
2.	"Visions"	5:23
3.	"Living for the City"	7:22
4.	"Golden Lady"	4:58

Side two
No.	Title	Length
1.	"Higher Ground"	3:42
2.	"Jesus Children of America"	4:10
3.	"All in Love Is Fair"	3:41
4.	"Don't You Worry 'Bout a Thing"	4:44
5.	"He's Misstra Know-It-All"	5:35
Total length:		44:15

== Personnel ==
"Too High"

- Stevie Wonder – lead vocal, Fender Rhodes electric piano, harmonica, drums, Moog bass
- Lani Groves, Tasha Thomas, Jim Gilstrap – background vocals

"Visions"

- Stevie Wonder – lead vocal, Fender Rhodes electric piano
- Malcolm Cecil – upright bass
- Dean Parks – acoustic guitar
- David T. Walker – electric guitar

"Living for the City"

- Stevie Wonder – lead vocal, background vocals, Fender Rhodes electric piano, drums, Moog bass, T.O.N.T.O. synthesizer, handclaps
- Calvin Hardaway, Ira Tucker Jr., Jonathan Vigoda – additional voices

"Golden Lady"

- Stevie Wonder – lead vocal, acoustic piano, Fender Rhodes electric piano, drums, Moog bass, T.O.N.T.O. synthesizer
- Clarence Bell – Hammond organ
- Ralph Hammer – acoustic guitar
- Larry "Nastyee" Latimer – congas

"Higher Ground"

- Stevie Wonder – lead vocal, Hohner clavinet, drums, Moog bass, tambourine, handclaps

"Jesus Children of America"

- Stevie Wonder – lead vocal, background vocal, Fender Rhodes electric piano, Hohner clavinet, drums, Moog bass, handclaps, tambourine

"All in Love Is Fair"

- Stevie Wonder – lead vocal, acoustic piano, Fender Rhodes electric piano, drums
- Scott Edwards – electric bass

"Don't You Worry 'Bout a Thing"

- Stevie Wonder – lead vocal, background vocal, piano, drums, Moog bass
- Yusuf Roahman – shaker
- Sheila Wilkerson – bongos, Latin gourd

"He's Misstra Know-It-All"

- Stevie Wonder – lead vocal, background vocal, piano, drums, handclaps, T.O.N.T.O. synthesizer, congas
- Willie Weeks – electric bass

Technical personnel

- Associate producers, programming of T.O.N.T.O. system containing ARP, Moog and other synthesizers, and engineering of electronic music – Robert Margouleff and Malcolm Cecil
- Recordists – Dan Barbiero, Austin Godsey
- Tape operator – Gary Olazabal
- Mastering – George Marino
- Recording coordinators – John Harris, Ira Tucker Jr.
- Album art – Efram Wolff

== Charts ==
=== Weekly charts ===
Chart (1973)	Peak position
Australian Albums (Kent Music Report)	26
UK Albums (BMRB)	8
Cashbox Pop Albums	1
Billboard Soul LPs	1
Billboard Top LPs & Tape	4

=== Year-end charts ===
Chart (1973)	Peak positions
U.S. Billboard Top Soul Albums	37

Chart (1974)	Peak positions
U.S. Billboard Pop Albums	4
U.S. Billboard Top Soul Albums	9

=== Singles ===
Year	Name	US	US R&B	US AC
1973	"Higher Ground"	4	1	41
1973	"Living for the City"	8	1	–
1974	"Don't You Worry 'Bout a Thing"	16	2	9

== Certifications ==
Region	Certification	Certified units/sales
Canada (Music Canada)	Gold	50,000^{^}
United Kingdom (BPI)	Gold	100,000^{^}
^{^} Shipments figures based on certification alone.

== See also ==
- List of 1970s albums considered the best
- List of Billboard number-one R&B albums of 1973
