= He's Misstra Know-It-All =

1974 single by Stevie Wonder

Single by Stevie Wonder

from the album Innervisions
- B-side: "You Can't Judge a Book by Its Cover"
- Released: April 1974
- Recorded: April 5-8, 1973
- Studio: Record Plant, New York City; Mediasound, New York City
- Genre: Soul, pop
- Length: 5:38 (album version); 3:25 (single version)
- Label: Tamla
- Songwriter: Stevie Wonder
- Producers: Stevie Wonder; Malcolm Cecil; Robert Margouleff

Stevie Wonder singles chronology
"Don't You Worry 'bout a Thing" (1973)	"He's Misstra Know-It-All" (1974)	"You Haven't Done Nothin'" (1974)

Audio video
- "He's Misstra Know-It-All" (album version) on YouTube

"He's Misstra Know-It-All" is a single by Stevie Wonder for the Tamla (Motown) label, from his Innervisions album, which reached number 10 on the UK Singles Chart in April 1974. The song takes the form of a mellow ballad with a steady beat, principally a solo performance with Wonder providing lead vocal, background vocal, piano, drums, handclaps and congas. Horn sounds are played on the Moog synthesizer that is programmed by Malcolm Cecil and Robert Margouleff. Ethereal flute-like sounds are provided by the TONTO modular synthesizer that is also programmed by Cecil and Margouleff. Willie Weeks, on electric bass, is the only other musician. Towards the end of the song the mood changes to a stronger feel, more strident singing and with hand-claps emphasising the beat, half-beat and quarter-beat.

"He's Misstra Know-It-All" was re-released in 1977 in both the UK and US as the B-side to "Sir Duke".

The song is essentially a long description of a know-it-all confidence trickster character who is a "man with a plan", who has a slick answer to all his critics and who has "a counterfeit dollar in his hand". It has been alleged that this is a reference to United States' President Richard Nixon, who resigned the same year the single was released.

== Recording ==
The song was started and completed in a matter of three days. Piano, drums and lead vocals were recorded on April 5, 1973. Harmonica and background vocals were recorded on April 6. Synthesizer overdubs and mixing took place on April 8.

== Track listing ==
A. "He's Misstra Know-It-All" – 3:25 (Stevie Wonder)
B. "You Can't Judge a Book by Its Cover" – 2:32 (Wonder, Henry Cosby, Sylvia Moy)

== Personnel ==
Information is based on the album’s liner notes

- Stevie Wonder – lead vocal, background vocal, piano, drums, handclaps, congas
- Malcolm Cecil - TONTO synthesizer programming
- Robert Margouleff - TONTO synthesizer programming
- Willie Weeks – electric bass
