= Funky Situation =

Album by Wilson Pickett

A Funky Situation

Studio album by Wilson Pickett
- Released: 1978
- Studios: Fame, Muscle Shoals, Alabama
- Genres: R&B, disco
- Length: 28:11
- Labels: Big Tree; Wicked
- Producer: Rick Hall

Wilson Pickett chronology
Pickett in the Pocket (1974)	A Funky Situation (1978)	I Want You (1980)

A Funky Situation is a studio album by the American musician Wilson Pickett, released in 1978.

== Production ==
The album was recorded in Muscle Shoals, Alabama. It was produced by Rick Hall. The horn arrangements were by Harrison Calloway, Jr.

== Critical reception ==
Professional ratings
Review scores
Source	Rating
AllMusic	1/5 stars
Christgau's Record Guide	B
The Encyclopedia of Popular Music	2/5 stars
The New Rolling Stone Record Guide	3/5 stars

The Bay State Banner deemed it a " dirty-old-man-at-the-disco album." The Globe and Mail called it "an excellent wild dancing album."

The New Rolling Stone Record Guide wrote that the album "manages to update the tracks—including the inspired 'Lay Me Like You Hate Me', a summation of Pickett's philosophy of romance—without losing the singer's distinctive style." The San Diego Union-Tribune considered it "underrated."

== Track listing ==
1. "Dance with Me" (Harrison Calloway)
2. "She's So Tight" (Rita Grimm, Yvonne Norman)
3. "The Night We Called It a Day" (Charles Feldman, John Grazier)
4. "Dance You Down" (Al Cartee, Ava Alderidge)
5. "Hold on to Your Hinie" (Tony Joe White)
6. "Groovin'" (Eddie Brigati, Felix Cavaliere)
7. "Lay Me Like You Hate Me" (Wilson Pickett)
8. "Funky Situation" (Curtis Wilkins)
9. "Time to Let the Sun Shine on Me" (Wilson Pickett)
10. "Who Turned You On" (Curtis Wilkins)

== Personnel ==
- Wilson Pickett – vocals
- Randy McCormick – keyboards
- Ken Bell, Larry Byrom – guitar
- Bob Wray – bass
- Roger Clark, Roger Hawkins (track 9) – drums
- Mickey Buckins – percussion
- Charles Chalmers, Donna Rhodes, Sandra Rhodes, Ava Aldridge, Cindy Richardson, Suzy Storm – backing vocals
- Muscle Shoals Horns – horns
- Harrison Calloway – horn arrangements

Technical

- Lynn Dreese Breslin – albums design
- Jim Houghton – cover photography
