= Never Dreamed You'd Leave in Summer =

1971 single by Stevie Wonder

Single by Stevie Wonder

from the album Where I'm Coming From
- B-side: "If You Really Love Me"
- Released: 1971
- Recorded: October 1970–1971
- Genre: Soul
- Length: 2:56
- Label: Tamla
- Songwriters: Stevie Wonder, Syreeta Wright
- Producer: Stevie Wonder

Stevie Wonder singles chronology
| "Heaven Help Us All" (1970) | "Never Dreamed You'd Leave in Summer" (1971) | "If You Really Love Me" (1971) |

"Never Dreamed You'd Leave in Summer" is a 1971 song by Stevie Wonder, featured on his album Where I'm Coming From. The song is a ballad, describing a failed relationship using the metaphor of changing seasons. Co-written by Syreeta Wright and released on Tamla 54202 in 1971 as the flip side of "We Can Work It Out", the single stalled at #78 on the Billboard Hot 100, but it remains one of Stevie Wonder's most popular ballads to this day. Cash Box described the song by saying that "lively melodic work is heightened by an exceptional performance."

Wonder performed a version of the song at Michael Jackson's memorial service on July 7, 2009, his voice cracking with emotion as he called out his friend's name during the song's final refrain, "Why didn't you stay?"

== Chart performance ==
| Chart (1971) | Peak position |
|---|---|
| US Billboard Hot 100 | 78 |

== Cover versions ==
- The song was covered by Three Dog Night and included on their album Harmony.
- The song was also covered by Joan Baez on her 1975 album Diamonds and Rust.
- Phil Collins also recorded the song for his album of soul covers, Going Back.
- James Blake also recorded the song for his cover album, simply titled 'covers'

== Popular culture ==
- A large portion of the song is played during a scene in the film, Poetic Justice; the full song is on its accompanying soundtrack album.
- A portion of this song was also remade by Lauryn Hill on Hip-Hop artist Common's "Retrospect For Life," found on his 1997 album One Day It'll All Make Sense.
- The full song is played during a scene in the show Scandal (TV series) episode 8, season 7 "Robin".
