= American Soul Man =

Studio album by Wilson Pickett
- Released: 1987
- Genre: Soul
- Label: Motown
- Producer: Robert Margouleff

Wilson Pickett chronology
Right Track (1981)	American Soul Man (1987)	A Man and a Half: The Best of Wilson Pickett (1992)

American Soul Man is an album by the American musician Wilson Pickett, released in 1987. "Don't Turn Away" was released as a single. The album was a commercial disappointment, in part due to MCA Records' acquisition of Motown.

The album peaked at No. 75 on Billboard's Top Black Albums chart. "In the Midnight Hour" was nominated for a Grammy Award for "Best R&B Vocal Performance, Male".

== Production ==
Recorded in Los Angeles, the album was produced by Robert Margouleff. Pickett used synthesizers on the majority of the tracks. Gary Myrick played guitar on the album. "In the Midnight Hour" is a remake of Pickett's biggest hit. "A Man of Value" incorporates elements of gospel music.

== Critical reception ==
Professional ratings
Review scores
Source	Rating
AllMusic	2/5 stars
MusicHound Rock: The Essential Album Guide	3/5 stars
The Rolling Stone Album Guide	3.5/5 stars
The Virgin Encyclopedia of R&B And Soul	2/5 stars

The Chicago Tribune wrote: "Neither an exercise in nostalgia nor a pointless attempt to be trendy, this new album is classic American soul performed by one of its finest artists." The Washington Post determined that "now that Motown's got him, you'd expect the emphasis to be on production, so there's no surprise to find the synthesizers and electronic drums... What is a surprise, however, is how easily Pickett adapts to the setting." The Kingston Whig-Standard noted that, "although Pickett can grind out a dance song as sexily as anyone, no one can be more passionate on a ballad." The Cincinnati Post deemed "Just Let Her Know" "a funky bit of soulful stroll." The Edmonton Journal praised Pickett's "emotionally-charged and powerful voice."

== Track listing ==
American Soul Man track listing
No.	Title	Writer(s)	Length
1.	"A Thing Called Love"	Jerry Lynn Williams	4:09
2.	"When Your Heart Speaks"	Peter Bunetta, Gary Osborne, Joe Ericksen	5:04
3.	"Love Never Let Me Down"	Larry Weiss, Allan Rich	3:59
4.	"A Man of Value"	Weiss	4:06
5.	"(I Wanna) Make Love to You"	Williams	4:02
6.	"In the Midnight Hour"	Steve Cropper, Wilson Pickett	6:22
7.	"Don't Turn Away"	Darryl Horne, Richard Bowen, Donna Bowen	4:27
8.	"Just Let Her Know"	Richard Jon Smith	4:28
9.	"Can't Stop Now"	Jack Conrad, Rick Neigher, Sue Shifrin	4:07
