= Talking Book =

1972 studio album by Stevie Wonder

Studio album by Stevie Wonder
- Released: October 27, 1972
- Recorded: May–July 1972
- Studio: Electric Lady, New York City; Crystal Sound, Hollywood; Record Plant, Los Angeles; AIR, London
- Genre: Progressive soul; funk; soul; rock; jazz
- Length: 43:29
- Label: Tamla
- Producer: Stevie Wonder; Robert Margouleff (assoc.); Malcolm Cecil (assoc.)

Stevie Wonder chronology
Music of My Mind (1972)	Talking Book (1972)	Innervisions (1973)

Singles from Talking Book
- 1. "Superstition" Released: October 24, 1972; 2. "You Are the Sunshine of My Life" Released: March 10, 1973

Talking Book is the fifteenth studio album by American singer, songwriter, and musician Stevie Wonder, released on October 27, 1972, by Tamla, a subsidiary of Motown Records. This album and Music of My Mind, released earlier the same year, are generally considered to mark the start of Wonder's "classic period". The sound of the album is sharply defined by Wonder's use of keyboards and synthesizers.

The album peaked at number three on the Billboard top albums chart and finished at number three on Billboard's year-end chart for 1973. "Superstition" reached number one on the Billboard Hot 100 and Hot Soul Singles charts, and "You Are the Sunshine of My Life" hit number one on the Hot 100 and Easy Listening charts. Talking Book earned Wonder his first Grammy Award, with "You Are the Sunshine of My Life" winning Best Male Pop Vocal Performance at the 16th Grammy Awards; "Superstition" also won Best Male R&B Vocal Performance and Best R&B Song. Often included in lists of the greatest albums of all time, Talking Book was voted number 322 in the third edition of Colin Larkin's All Time Top 1000 Albums (2000), and Rolling Stone ranked it number 59 on its list of the "500 Greatest Albums of All Time" in 2020.

== Recording ==
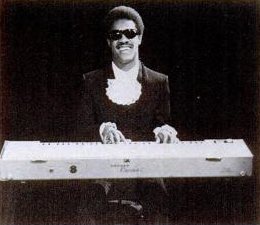
Wonder in 1972

Much of the material on Talking Book was recorded at the same time as that on Music of My Mind. As the album saw Wonder enjoying more artistic freedom from Motown and relying less on Motown's head Berry Gordy for musical direction and expression, it is often seen as the beginning of his transition from a youthful prodigy into an independent and experimental artist. Speaking of the album in 2000, Wonder said: "It wasn't so much that I wanted to say anything except where I wanted to just express various many things that I felt—the political point of view that I have, the social point of view that I have, the passions, emotion and love that I felt, compassion, the fun of love that I felt, the whole thing in the beginning with a joyful love and then the pain of love."

The sound of the album is sharply defined by Wonder's keyboard work, especially synthesizers. While the synthesizers give a funky edge to tracks like "Maybe Your Baby", the Hohner Clavinet embellishments on "Big Brother" evoke a six-string acoustic guitar, and the note-bending harmonica work on several tracks touches on some folk and blues influences. Wonder's use of the Clavinet Model C on "Superstition" is widely regarded as one of the definitive tracks featuring the instrument. Wonder played the majority of the instruments on the album himself, but he received some support from such guest musicians as Jeff Beck, Ray Parker Jr., David Sanborn, and Buzz Feiten.

Robert Margouleff and Malcolm Cecil collaborated with Wonder on four of his "classic" albums: Music of My Mind, Talking Book, Innervisions and Fulfillingness' First Finale, as well as several albums by the Isley Brothers and others. Their unusual production technique of using multiple layers of instruments like the Clavinet, Fender Rhodes electric piano, and ARP and Moog synthesizers, rather than the more-typical string orchestra, helped to give Talking Book and these other three albums their distinctive sound.

== Packaging and title ==
The album's cover photo, taken by Robert Margouleff in Los Angeles, features Wonder with his hair in cornrows, wearing jewelry, and dressed in African-style robes, in a "quasi-Biblical desert landscape". The inner photo of the gatefold sleeve shows Wonder in silhouette against a dramatic landscape sunrise.

The packaging of original pressings of the album incorporated both the album's title and Wonder's name embossed in braille (as well as being printed in English), along with a message that was only embossed in braille until the 2000 release of the album. The message reads:

Here is my music. It is all I have to tell you how I feel. Know that your love keeps my love strong.

— Stevie

Margouleff later recalled that it had been difficult to get Wonder to choose which songs to put on the album, because there were so many. Associate producer Malcolm Cecil said, "Steve, you know, this is an album. It's not a talking book... Oh, I think you should call this album Talking Book" and Wonder agreed. (Note: Talking books, which were vinyl recordings of books for blind people, were recorded at half normal album speed, at 16 2/3 rpm, and which therefore ran twice as long.)

== Critical reception ==
Retrospective professional reviews
Review scores
Source	Rating
AllMusic	5/5 stars
The Austin Chronicle	4/5 stars
Christgau's Record Guide	A
Encyclopedia of Popular Music	5/5 stars
The Great Rock Discography	9/10
Los Angeles Times	3.5/4 stars
MusicHound Rock	5/5
The New Rolling Stone Album Guide	5/5 stars
Pitchfork	10/10
Q	5/5 stars

Released after Wonder toured with the Rolling Stones in 1972, Talking Book became a major hit, peaking at number three on the Billboard Pop Albums chart in February 1973, and became the first album by Wonder to reach the top of the Top R&B Albums chart, where it remained for three weeks. The popular appeal of the recording helped destroy the myth that R&B artists were incapable of creating music that could be appreciated by rock audiences, and marked a unique period for R&B artists (especially Motown artists). Wonder won three awards for Talking Book at the 1974 Grammys: Best Male Pop Vocal Performance for "You Are the Sunshine of My Life", and both Best Male R&B Vocal Performance and Best R&B Song for "Superstition". Incidentally, at the same ceremony, Wonder's next album, Innervisions, won Album of the Year, and Talking Book's associate producers, Malcolm Cecil and Robert Margouleff, won the Best Engineered Album, Non-Classical award for their work on that album. Reviewing the album for Rolling Stone at the time of its release, Vince Aletti called Talking Book "ambitious" and "richly-textured", writing that "even at its dreamiest, the music has a glowing vibrancy" and makes for an altogether "exceptional, exciting album, the work of a now quite matured genius". Writing a few years later in The Village Voice about Wonder's Songs in the Key of Life (1976), Robert Christgau said that "Talking Book is closer to a perfect album", as "a more complex and satisfying delight—a delight that combines the freewheeling energy of Dylan and the Stones with the softer accessibility of a Carole King—is provided by an artist with the ambition to ride his own considerable momentum and the talent to do more than just hang on while doing so." In Christgau's Record Guide: Rock Albums of the Seventies (1981), Christgau said the album found Wonder taking artistic control and breaking through, continuing his "wild multi-voice experiments" and writing better ballads without losing "his endearing natural bathos"; Christgau also highlighted "Superstition" as a translation of Wonder's "way of knowledge into hard-headed, hard-rocking political analysis". J. D. Considine, in The New Rolling Stone Album Guide (2004), called the album "a pop tour de force".

Talking Book has appeared in professional rankings of the greatest albums of all time. It was voted number 322 in the third edition of Colin Larkin's All Time Top 1000 Albums (2000). In 2003, Rolling Stone ranked it number 90 on the magazine's list of the 500 greatest albums of all time; it maintained that ranking on the 2012 version of the list, and was number 59 on the 2020 edition.

It was the first album purchased by former US president Barack Obama.

== Track listing ==
All tracks are written by Stevie Wonder, unless otherwise noted.

Side one
No.	Title	Writer(s)	Length
1.	"You Are the Sunshine of My Life"		2:58
2.	"Maybe Your Baby"		6:45
3.	"You and I (We Can Conquer the World)"		4:39
4.	"Tuesday Heartbreak"		3:09
5.	"You've Got It Bad Girl"	Wonder; Yvonne Wright	4:55
Total length:			22:13

Side two
No.	Title	Writer(s)	Length
1.	"Superstition"		4:26
2.	"Big Brother"		3:35
3.	"Blame It on the Sun"	Wonder; Syreeta Wright	3:28
4.	"Lookin' for Another Pure Love"	Wonder; S. Wright	4:45
5.	"I Believe (When I Fall in Love It Will Be Forever)"	Wonder; Y. Wright	4:48
Total length:			21:16

== Personnel ==
"You Are the Sunshine of My Life"

- Stevie Wonder – lead vocal, background vocal, Fender Rhodes, drums
- Jim Gilstrap – first lead vocal, background vocal
- Lani Groves – second lead vocal, background vocal
- Gloria Barley – background vocal
- Scott Edwards – electric bass
- Daniel Ben Zebulon – congas
- Uncredited - horn section

"Maybe Your Baby"

- Stevie Wonder – lead vocal, background vocal, Hohner Clavinet, drums, Moog bass
- Ray Parker Jr. – electric guitar

"You and I (We Can Conquer the World)"

- Stevie Wonder – lead vocal, piano, T.O.N.T.O. synthesizer, Moog bass

"Tuesday Heartbreak"

- Stevie Wonder – lead vocal, background vocal, Fender Rhodes, Hohner Clavinet, drums, Moog bass
- Deniece Williams – background vocal
- Shirley Brewer – background vocal
- David Sanborn – alto saxophone

"You've Got It Bad Girl"

- Stevie Wonder – lead vocal, background vocal, Fender Rhodes, drums, Moog bass, T.O.N.T.O. synthesizer
- Jim Gilstrap – background vocal
- Lani Groves – background vocal
- Daniel Ben Zebulon – congas

"Superstition"

- Stevie Wonder – lead vocal, Hohner Clavinet, drums, Moog bass
- Trevor Lawrence – tenor saxophone
- Steve Madaio – trumpet

"Big Brother"

- Stevie Wonder – lead vocals, Hohner Clavinet, drums/percussion, harmonica, Moog bass

"Blame It on the Sun"

- Stevie Wonder – lead vocal, background vocal, piano, harpsichord, drums, Moog bass, T.O.N.T.O. synthesizer
- Jim Gilstrap – background vocal
- Lani Groves – background vocal

"Lookin' for Another Pure Love"

- Stevie Wonder – lead vocal, background vocal, Fender Rhodes, drums, Moog bass
- Debra Wilson – background vocal
- Shirley Brewer – background vocal
- Loris Harvin (Delores Harvin) – background vocal
- Jeff Beck – electric guitar
- Buzz Feiten (Howard "Buzz" Feiten) – electric guitar

"I Believe (When I Fall in Love It Will Be Forever)"

- Stevie Wonder – lead vocal, background vocal, piano, Hohner Clavinet, drums, Moog bass

== Production personnel ==
- Malcolm Cecil – associate producer, engineering, Moog programming
- Robert Margouleff – associate producer, engineering, Moog programming, photography
- Austin Godsey – engineer, recording
- Joan Decola – recording
- George Marino – mastering

== Charts ==
=== Weekly charts ===
Chart	Position
Canadian RPM Albums Chart	12
Italian Albums Chart	16
Japanese Oricon LPs Chart	44
Norwegian Albums Chart	24
UK Albums Chart	16
U.S. Billboard Pop Albums	3
U.S. Billboard R&B Albums	1

=== Year-end charts ===
Chart (1973)	Position
French Albums Chart	61
Italian Albums Chart	54
U.S. Billboard Pop Albums	3

Chart (1974)	Position
U.S. Billboard Pop Albums	27

== Certifications ==
Region	Certification	Certified units/sales
Canada (Music Canada)	Gold	50,000^{^}
United Kingdom (BPI)	Gold	100,000^{^}
^{^} Shipments figures based on certification alone.

== See also ==
- List of 1970s albums considered the best
- List of Billboard number-one R&B albums of 1973
