= Where I'm Coming From =

1971 studio album by Stevie Wonder

Studio album by Stevie Wonder
- Released: April 9, 1971
- Recorded: July 1970–February 1971
- Studios: Hitsville U.S.A., Detroit, Michigan
- Genres: Soul, pop, funk
- Length: 34:46
- Label: Tamla
- Producer: Stevie Wonder

Stevie Wonder chronology
Signed, Sealed & Delivered (1970)	Where I'm Coming From (1971)	Music of My Mind (1972)

Singles from Where I'm Coming From
- 1. "Never Dreamed You'd Leave in Summer" Released: July 9, 1971 (UK); 2. "If You Really Love Me" Released: July 22, 1971

Where I'm Coming From is the thirteenth studio album by Stevie Wonder. The album was released by Motown Records on April 9, 1971, and peaked on the Billboard Pop Albums at No. 62, and on the Billboard R&B Albums Chart at No. 7. All nine songs were written by Wonder and Motown singer-songwriter Syreeta Wright, Wonder's first wife. It was the last album produced under his first contract with Motown Records. Including live albums, this is Wonder's fifteenth album overall, and thirteenth studio album.

== History ==
Motown's founder Berry Gordy had maintained tight control over his company's productions, but as the artists' careers progressed, they began to feel the need for the allowance of social consciousness and artistic freedom in their recordings. Stevie Wonder was one of the Motown artists, along with Marvin Gaye, who wanted to expand with new styles and musical techniques, some of which became more apparent in the earlier album For Once In My Life.

Although Wonder had begun producing his own recordings, Motown still retained control over the content of his albums. Tensions increased as Wonder approached his twenty-first birthday; his contract had a clause which allowed Wonder to void it upon becoming a legal adult. When the president of Motown approached Wonder about renegotiating his contract, Wonder refused and asked for his contract to be voided.

Anticipating this event, Wonder took advantage of the fact that Motown would be forced to accept whatever he gave to them, and was able to produce Where I'm Coming From without any outside interference from the company. In particular, the song "I Wanna Talk To You"—which portrayed a racially-charged dialog between a black man and an old southern white man (Wonder portrayed both characters)--is also a covert reference to his breakaway from Gordy and Motown (particularly apparent in the ad-libbed line "I'm gonna take my share...!").

Where I'm Coming From, which departed drastically from the Motown Sound employed in previous Stevie Wonder albums, yielded the U.S. number-eight hit single, "If You Really Love Me." The soft ballad "Never Dreamed You'd Leave In Summer" (a predecessor to the later recording "Superwoman (Where Were You When I Needed You?)") was also successful. Much of the rest of the album was social commentary and war-themed songs.

The album foreshadows Wonder's "classic period" albums with its production approach and range of material. Wonder further developed the use of the Hohner clavinet that was to be fully explored on the classic period albums. Like Wonder's earlier albums, several tracks on Where I'm Coming From use Motown studio musicians the Funk Brothers, and also make use of string orchestras. This is also the first Stevie Wonder album to feature Wonder playing synth bass on the majority of its tracks – the two exceptions being "Think Of Me As Your Soldier" and "Take Up A Course In Happiness," which feature electric bass.

== Reception ==
Professional ratings
Review scores
Source	Rating
AllMusic	4.5/5 stars
Christgau's Record Guide	B+
The Rolling Stone Album Guide	4/5 stars
Virgin Encyclopedia of Popular Music	4/5 stars

Released at around the same time as Marvin Gaye's What's Going On, with similar ambitions and themes, they have been compared; in a contemporary review by Vince Aletti in Rolling Stone, Gaye's album was seen as successful, while Wonder's album was seen as failing due to "self-indulgent and cluttered" production, "undistinguished" and "pretentious" lyrics, and an overall lack of unity and flow.

== Track listing ==
All songs written by Stevie Wonder and Syreeta Wright.
Arranged by David Van DePitte, Jerry Long, Paul Riser and Stevie Wonder. One version of the original record label listed the final song as "Sunshine In Their Eyes/Everything Is Happenin'".

Side one

1. "Look Around" – 2:45
2. "Do Yourself a Favor" – 6:10
3. "Think of Me as Your Soldier" – 3:37
4. "Something Out of the Blue" – 2:59
5. "If You Really Love Me" – 3:00

Side two

1. "I Wanna Talk to You" – 5:18
2. "Take Up a Course in Happiness" – 3:11
3. "Never Dreamed You'd Leave in Summer" – 2:53
4. "Sunshine in Their Eyes" – 6:58
