= You Are the Sunshine of My Life =

1973 single by Stevie Wonder

Single by Stevie Wonder

from the album Talking Book
- B-side: "Tuesday Heartbreak"
- Released: March 10, 1973
- Recorded: Summer 1972
- Genre: Pop-soul; easy listening
- Length: 2:58
- Label: Tamla
- Songwriter: Stevie Wonder
- Producer: Stevie Wonder

Stevie Wonder singles chronology
"Superstition" (1972)	"You Are the Sunshine of My Life" (1973)	"Higher Ground" (1973)

Official audio
- "You Are The Sunshine Of My Life" on YouTube

"You Are the Sunshine of My Life" is a 1973 single released by Stevie Wonder. The song became Wonder's third number-one single on the Billboard Hot 100 chart and his first number-one on the Easy Listening chart. It won Wonder a Grammy Award for Best Male Pop Vocal Performance, and was nominated for both Record of the Year and Song of the Year. This song was the second single (following "Superstition") released from the 1972 album entitled Talking Book, which stayed at number one on the R&B albums chart for three weeks.

Rolling Stone ranks the song at number 183 on their list of the "500 Greatest Songs of All Time". Billboard called it "a soft, haunting ballad with outstanding electric piano runs and outstanding production work."

In 2002, the song was inducted into the Grammy Hall of Fame.

== Background ==
The first two lines of the song are sung, not by Wonder, but by Jim Gilstrap; Lani Groves sings the next two. Gilstrap and Groves, together with Gloria Barley, also provide backing vocals. The single version of the song differs from the album version with the addition of horns to the mix; this version is also included in the greatest hits compilation album Stevie Wonder's Original Musiquarium I (1982).

== Reception ==
Cash Box said that Wonder "changes the pace [from 'Superstition'] and delivers a stirring ballad performance that is also certain to go gold instantly." Record World said that the "tune that's been covered many times is done best by the originator."

== Personnel ==
Source: Talking Book, Tamla: T 319L, October 27, 1972 (album cover)

- Stevie Wonder – lead vocals, background vocals, Fender Rhodes piano, drums
- Jim Gilstrap – first lead vocals, background vocals
- Lani Groves – second lead vocals, background vocals
- Gloria Barley – background vocals
- Scott Edwards – electric bass
- Daniel Ben Zebulon – congas
- unknown — horns

== Chart performance ==
=== Weekly charts ===
Chart (1973)	Peak position
Australia (Kent Music Report)	10
Canada Top Singles (RPM)	5
Canada RPM Adult Contemporary	9
Germany (GfK)	42
New Zealand (Listener)	8
UK Singles Chart	7
U.S. Billboard Hot 100	1
U.S. Billboard Adult Contemporary	1
U.S. Billboard R&B	3
U.S. Cash Box Top 100	1

=== Year-end charts ===
Chart (1973)	Rank
Australia	74
Canada	64
U.S. Billboard Hot 100	19
U.S. Billboard Easy Listening	9
U.S. Cash Box	59

== Certifications ==
Region	Certification	Certified units/sales
New Zealand (RMNZ)	Platinum	30,000^{‡}
Spain (Promusicae)	Gold	30,000^{‡}
United Kingdom (BPI)	Silver	200,000^{‡}
^{‡} Sales+streaming figures based on certification alone.

== See also ==
- List of Hot 100 number-one singles of 1973 (U.S.)
- List of number-one adult contemporary singles of 1973 (U.S.)
