= If You Really Love Me =

1971 song by Stevie Wonder and Syreeta Wright

Single by Stevie Wonder

from the album Where I'm Coming From
- B-side: "Think of Me As Your Soldier"
- Released: July 22, 1971
- Recorded: 1971
- Studio: Studio A, Hitsville U.S.A., Detroit
- Genre: R&B; pop
- Length: 3:00
- Label: Tamla
- Songwriters: Stevie Wonder; Syreeta Wright
- Producer: Stevie Wonder

Stevie Wonder singles chronology
"We Can Work It Out" (1971)	"If You Really Love Me" (1971)	"Superwoman (Where Were You When I Needed You)" (1972)

"If You Really Love Me" is a song written by Stevie Wonder and Syreeta Wright. Wonder recorded the song and released his version as a single from his 1971 album Where I'm Coming From. The single peaked in the top 10 of the Billboard Hot 100 (number 8), Billboard′s R&B chart (number 4), and Billboard′s Easy Listening chart (number 10).

== Background ==
The song was one of the last to feature Motown's background band the Funk Brothers. After its release, Wonder left the Hitsville USA studios to record in New York City, playing most of the instruments himself. Wonder played Moog bass synthesizer, drums, and piano on "If You Really Love Me", while Wright is featured in the background singing.

Cash Box said of it that "Wonder, via superb use of dynamics and fine mood changes will bring this tune to national attention."

== Personnel ==
- Stevie Wonder – lead and background vocals; arrangement, instrumentation; production
- Syreeta Wright – background vocals
- The Funk Brothers – instrumentation
- David Van De Pitte – arrangement

== Chart performance ==
=== Weekly charts ===
Chart (1971)	Peak position
Canadian RPM Top Singles	20
UK Singles Chart	20
U.S. Billboard Hot 100	8
U.S. Billboard Adult Contemporary	10
U.S. R&B	4
U.S. Cash Box Top 100	9

=== Year-end charts ===
Chart (1971)	Rank
U.S. Billboard	48
U.S. Cash Box	77
U.S. R&B/Soul (Billboard)	28
