= Music of My Mind =

1972 studio album by Stevie Wonder

Studio album by Stevie Wonder
- Released: March 3, 1972
- Studio: Mediasound (New York City); Electric Lady (New York City); Crystal Industries (Los Angeles)
- Genre: Progressive soul
- Length: 47:35
- Label: Tamla
- Producer: Stevie Wonder; Robert Margouleff (assoc.); Malcolm Cecil (assoc.)

Stevie Wonder chronology
Where I'm Coming From (1971)	Music of My Mind (1972)	Talking Book (1972)

Singles from Music of My Mind
- 1. "Superwoman (Where Were You When I Needed You)" Released: April 25, 1972; 2. "Keep on Running" Released: August 15, 1972

Music of My Mind is the fourteenth studio album by American singer, songwriter, and musician Stevie Wonder. It was released on March 3, 1972, by Tamla Records, and was Wonder's first to be released under a new contract with Motown that allowed him full artistic control over his music. For the album, Wonder recruited electronic music pioneers Malcolm Cecil and Robert Margouleff as associate producers, employing their custom TONTO synthesizer. The album hit No. 21 on the Billboard Top LPs & Tape chart, and critics found it representative of Wonder's artistic growth. It is generally considered by modern critics to be the first album of Wonder's "classic period".

== Recording ==
Wonder became interested in using synthesizers after hearing the music of electronic group Tonto's Expanding Head Band. Inspired after a meeting with the group's members, Malcolm Cecil and Robert Margouleff, in May 1971, he began utilizing ARP and Moog synthesizers, stating that "the synthesizer has allowed me to do a lot of things I've wanted to do for a long time but were not possible till it came along." Margouleff and Cecil associate produced, engineered, and handled Moog programming for the album, and would go on to collaborate with Wonder on his next three albums. Wonder produced the album and played all of the instruments himself, except for the trombone on "Love Having You Around", which was played by Art Baron, and the guitar on "Superwoman", which was played by Howard "Buzz" Feiten.

== Release and reception ==
Professional ratings
Review scores
Source	Rating
AllMusic	4.5/5 stars
The Austin Chronicle	3.5/5 stars
Christgau's Record Guide	B+
The Encyclopedia of Popular Music	5/5 stars
The Great Rock Discography	7/10
Los Angeles Times	3/4 stars
MusicHound R&B	4.5/5 stars
Q	3/5 stars
The Rolling Stone Album Guide	4/5 stars

When Music of My Mind was first released on March 3, 1972, it became a success with both black and white audiences in the United States, charting at number 6 and number 21 on the Billboard R&B and pop charts, respectively. Contemporary critics viewed it as Wonder's final step into artistic maturity. In Rolling Stone, Vince Aletti said it showcased the ambitious use of Wonder's newfound artistic control and maturity as a songwriter, although he found some of the studio and vocal effects both gimmicky and self-indulgent. Robert Christgau of Creem believed that, like Ray Charles, Wonder transcended aesthetic sensibilities on Music of My Mind, which he said featured "some of the most musical synthesizer improvisations yet", but whose individual songs were not as impressive as the "one-man album" concept. Cash Box particularly praised the Moog synthesizer work on the single "Keep on Running." Penny Valentine was more enthusiastic in her review for Sounds, viewing the record as a milestone in modern music and a culmination of soul music's creative maturity. She especially praised Wonder's arrangement of "intriguing vocal patterns" on what she deemed "an album of explosive genius and unshackled self-expression".

The album was voted number 645 in the third edition of Colin Larkin's All Time Top 1000 Albums (2000). In 2003, Rolling Stone ranked it number 285 on the magazine's list of the 500 greatest albums of all time, and 350 on the 2020 edition.

In 2008, the album was re-released in the UK to coincide with Wonder's European tour.

The songs "Sweet Little Girl" and "Evil" feature prominently at the beginning and end of "Teddy Perkins", the sixth episode of the second season of the FX television series Atlanta.

== Track listing ==
All tracks are written by Stevie Wonder, except where noted.

Side one
No.	Title	Writer(s)	Length
1.	"Love Having You Around"	Wonder; Syreeta Wright	7:21
2.	"Superwoman (Where Were You When I Needed You)"		8:08
3.	"I Love Every Little Thing About You"		3:46
4.	"Sweet Little Girl"		4:54

Side two
No.	Title	Writer(s)	Length
1.	"Happier Than the Morning Sun"		5:18
2.	"Girl Blue"	Wonder; Yvonne Wright	3:35
3.	"Seems So Long"		4:27
4.	"Keep on Running"		6:40
5.	"Evil"	Wonder; S. Wright	3:33

== Personnel ==
- Stevie Wonder – lead vocals (all), background vocals (1–5, 8), drums (all but 5), handclaps (8), T.O.N.T.O. synthesizer (2, 6, 7, 9), piano (8, 9), Rhodes piano (1–4), talk box (1, 6), harmonica (4, 6), bongos (3), clavinet (5, 6, 8), Moog bass (all), tack piano (4)
- Art Baron – trombone (1)
- Buzz Feiten – electric guitar (2)
- Malcolm Cecil – Moog programming, associate producer, engineering
- Robert Margouleff – Moog programming, associate producer, engineering
- Syreeta – background vocals (4)
- Uncredited – background vocals (1, 8, 9)
- Joan DeCola – recording
- Rick Rowe – recording

== Charting singles ==
Year	Name	US	US R&B
1972	"Superwoman (Where Were You When I Needed You)"	33	13
1972	"Keep on Running"	90	36

== Charts ==
=== Weekly charts ===
Chart (1972)	Position
U.S. Billboard Pop Albums	21
U.S. Billboard R&B Albums	6

=== Year-end charts ===
Chart (1972)	Position
U.S. Billboard Pop Albums	47
U.S. Billboard R&B Albums	17

== See also ==
- List of 1970s albums considered the best
