= Tonto's Expanding Head Band =

British-American electronic music duo

- Genres: Electronic; experimental
- Years active: 1970s
- Labels: Embryo; Polydor; Atlantic
- Past members: Malcolm Cecil; Robert Margouleff

Tonto's Expanding Head Band was a British-American electronic music duo consisting of Malcolm Cecil and Robert Margouleff. Despite releasing only two albums in the early 1970s, the duo were influential in the development of electronic music and helped bring the synthesizer to the mainstream through session and production work for other musicians (most notably Stevie Wonder) and extensive commercial advertising work.

== The TONTO synthesizer ==
TONTO is an acronym for "The Original New Timbral Orchestra", the first, and still the largest, multitimbral polyphonic analog synthesizer in the world, designed and constructed over several years by Malcolm Cecil. TONTO started as a Moog modular synthesizer Series III owned by record producer Robert Margouleff. Later a second Moog III was added, then four Oberheim SEMs, two ARP 2600s, modules from Serge with Moog-like panels, EMS, Roland, Yamaha, etc. plus several custom modules designed by Serge Tcherepnin and Cecil himself - who has an electrical engineering background. Later, digital sound-generation circuitry and a collection of sequencers were added, along with MIDI control. All of these are housed in a semi-circle of curving wooden cabinets, 20 feet (6.1 m) in diameter and 6 feet (1.8 m) tall.

"I wanted to create an instrument that would be the first multitimbral polyphonic synthesizer. Multitimbral polyphony is different than the type of polyphony provided by most of today's synthesizers, on which you turn to a string patch and everything under your fingers is strings. In my book 'multitimbral' means each note you play has a different tone quality, as if the notes come from separate instruments. I wanted to be able to play live multitimbral polyphonic music using as many fingers and feet as I had."

TONTO was featured (as the "electronic room") in the 1974 Brian de Palma film Phantom of the Paradise. It was also used in the album 1980 by Gil Scott-Heron and Brian Jackson and was pictured on both the front and back covers of this album.

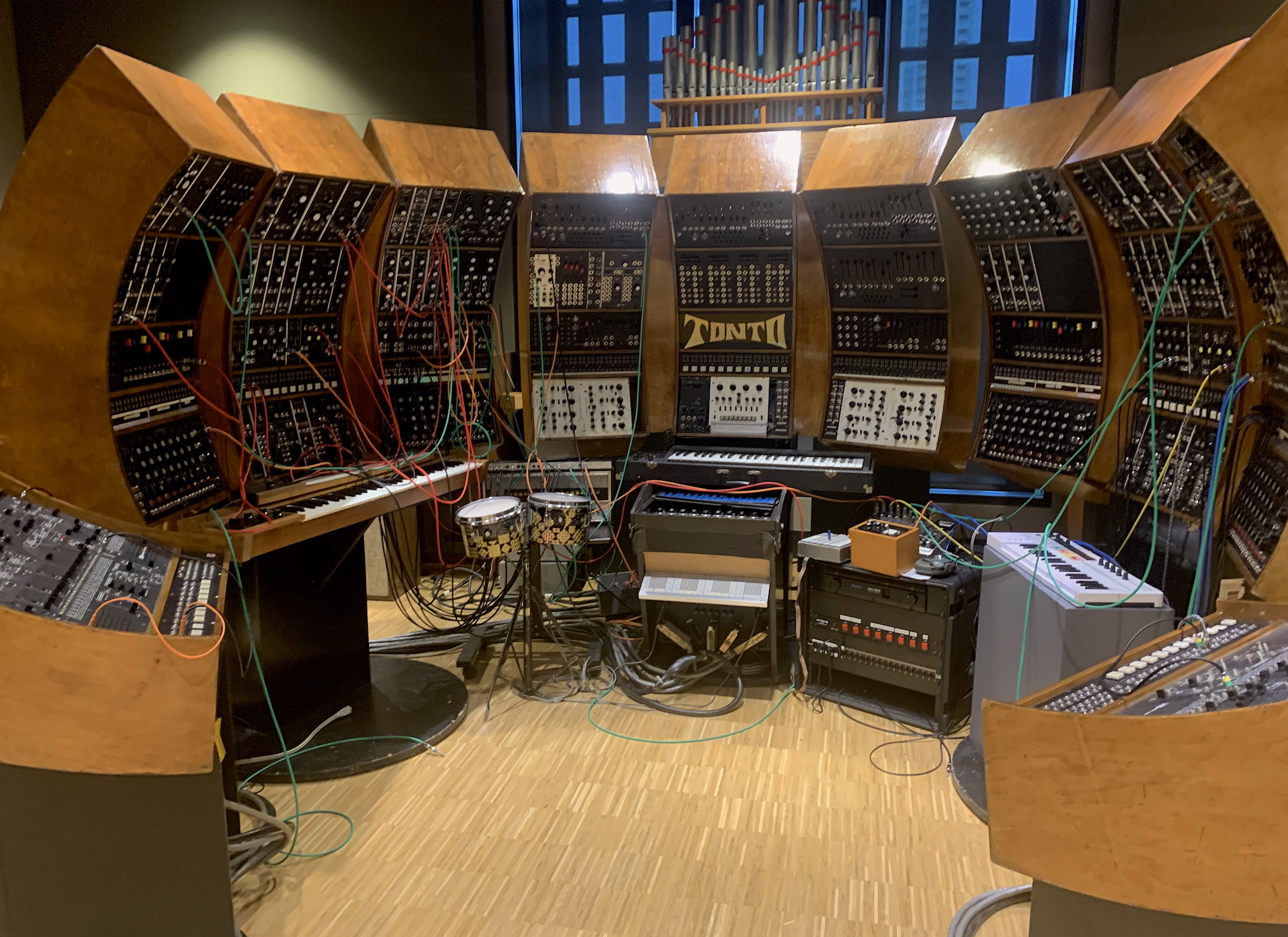
TONTO in a recording studio at its final home — the Canadian National Music Centre.

TONTO was owned by Malcolm Cecil since he acquired Robert Margouleff's share in 1975. In the mid-1990s TONTO was moved to Mutato Muzika studios, the headquarters of Mark Mothersbaugh and Devo, leading to widespread rumors that Mothersbaugh had purchased TONTO but this was not true. TONTO eventually made its way back to Cecil's home in Saugerties, New York. In late 2013 TONTO was purchased by the National Music Centre in Calgary, Alberta.

The NMC had long desired to acquire TONTO and upon moving it to Calgary, placed it on exhibit. In late 2017, John Leimseider completed a multi-year restoration on TONTO, replacing worn out jacks and repairing broken connections. TONTO is now playable, and is a part of the living collection of the National Music Centre. Synth artists can once again record with TONTO in NMC's recording studios.

== TONTO's influence ==
Tonto's Expanding Head Band's first album, Zero Time, was released in 1971 on the U.S. Embryo label (distributed by Atlantic Records) and attracted much attention. Stevie Wonder in particular was impressed enough to subsequently feature TONTO in his albums starting with Music of My Mind and continuing through Talking Book, Innervisions, Fulfillingness' First Finale and Jungle Fever; all projects which listed Margouleff and Cecil as associate producers, engineers and programmers (and winning them an engineering Grammy for Innervisions). Wonder said:

"How great it is at a time when technology and the science of music is at its highest point of evolution, to have the reintroduction of two of the most prominent forefathers in this music be heard again. It can be said of this work that it parallels with good wine. As it ages it only gets better with time. A toast to greatness... a toast to Zero Time... forever."

Writing in Keyboard Magazine in 1984, John Diliberto asserted that:

"... this collaboration changed the perspectives of black pop music as much as the Beatles' Sgt. Pepper altered the concept of white rock".

The remainder of the 1970s and 1980s saw TONTO featured on albums from Quincy Jones, Bobby Womack, the Isley Brothers, Steve Hillage, Billy Preston, and Weather Report, as well as releases from Stephen Stills, the Doobie Brothers, Dave Mason, Little Feat, Joan Baez, and others. TONTO was also used in Brian De Palma's 1974 movie Phantom of the Paradise as well as appearing on-screen. A second TONTO album, It's About Time, was released in 1974.

The vocalist Gil Scott-Heron and keyboardist Brian Jackson enlisted Cecil and TONTO for the production of their collaborative album, 1980 (1980). Scott-Heron and Jackson were featured on the album cover, posing with the synthesizer.

In 1996 a compilation album, TONTO Rides Again, was released, featuring all of Zero Time plus all of the tracks from It's About Time, although the latter tracks appeared with new titles. In the liner notes to the re-release, Mark Mothersbaugh wrote:

"Once upon a time, TONTO represented the cutting edge of artificial intelligence in the world of music - Robert and Malcolm are the mad chefs of aural cuisine with beefy tones and cheesy timbres, making brain chili for those brave enough and hungry enough. Consequently, back in the cultural wasteland of the Midwest, the release of Tonto's Expanding Head Band was an inspirational indicator for starving Spudboys who had grown tired of the soup du jour. It was official - noise was now Muzak, and Muzak was now noise. So with TONTO "riding again" and the orb-of-sound resurrected, expect a healing. The masses are asses who need TONTO's glasses. Lookout, here comes TONTO!"

The 2017 incremental game Universal Paperclips used the track Riversong, from the album Zero Time, as a space battle threnody.

== Virtual TONTO Live ==
Malcolm Cecil and his son, Milton aka DJ Moonpup, performed at the Big Chill Festival on 5 August 2006, a three-day event held at Eastnor Castle in Herefordshire in the UK. Due to TONTO being too large and expensive to ship for a one-hour performance, Cecil created a "Virtual TONTO" and played live over pre-recorded backing tracks and Malcolm playing an Arp 2600 live with Moonpup adding some DJ loops and samples. It was accompanied by a specially prepared visual show by Liz Searle with hundreds of pictures of TONTO and Poli Cecil's art pieces.

== Discography ==
- 1971: Zero Time (Embryo SD 732, US)
- 1974: It's About Time (Polydor, 2383 308, UK)
- 1975: Tonto's Expanding Head Band (Atlantic SD 18123, US) (reissue of Zero Time with different cover)
- 1996: Tonto Rides Again (Viceroy VIN6036-2) (CD compiling Zero Time and retitled tracks from It's About Time)
- 2006: Tonto's Expanding Head Band (Malcolm Cecil, limited edition CD) (remastered CD of Tonto Rides Again, with a bonus track)

=== Margouleff & Cecil engineering, production and programming credits ===
Stevie Wonder

- 1972: Music of My Mind
- 1972: Talking Book
- 1973: Innervisions
- 1974: Fulfillingness' First Finale
- 1991: Jungle Fever (Cecil only; additional engineering)
- 1995: Conversation Peace (Margouleff only; mixing)

The Isley Bros

- 1973: 3+3
- 1974: Live It Up
- 1975: The Heat Is On
- 1976: Harvest for the World (Cecil only)

Other acts

- 1970: Caldara – A Moog Mass
- 1971: Richie Havens – The Great Blind Degree (Moog synthesizer, engineering, remix)
- 1973: The Doobie Brothers – The Captain and Me (Arp synthesizer programming)
- 1973: Gene Parsons – Kindling
- 1974: Randy Newman – Good Old Boys (Moog and Arp programming)
- 1974: Ravi Shankar – Shankar Family and Friends (Moog synthesizer)
- 1975: Wilson Pickett – Join Me and Let's Be Free (synthesizer)
- 1975: Billy Preston – It's My Pleasure
- 1975: Weather Report – Tale Spinnin'
- 1975: Christopher Rainbow – Home of the Brave (synthesizer)
- 1977: Steve Hillage – Motivation Radio
