= Robert Margouleff =

- Born: Robert Margouleff; August 8, 1940 (age 85); New York, U.S.
- Genres: Electronic; synth-pop; funk; soul; rock; R&B
- Occupations: Music producer; film producer; recording engineer
- Instrument: Synthesizers
- Years active: 1960–present

Robert Margouleff is an American record producer, recording engineer, electronic music pioneer, audio expert, and film producer.

== Career ==
=== The Birth of TONTO ===
Margouleff was an early customer, friend and collaborator of fellow New Yorker and music instrument pioneer Robert Moog, contributing early insight toward Moog's musical instrument development for artists to routinely program and use synthesizers. He also was an early creative resource at Andy Warhol's "factory", eventually co-producing Ciao! Manhattan (1972), a semi-biographical cult film tale of 1960s counterculture film actress and socialite Edie Sedgwick, one of Warhol's "superstars".

In 1968, Robert Margouleff purchased a Moog Series IIIc, which was intended to be the "first orchestra of synthesizers". He soon went on to meet well-known bassist Malcolm Cecil, who approached him to learn more about this synthesizer. In exchange for Cecil teaching Margouleff how to use the recording console, Margouleff taught Cecil how to use the Moog. In just two weeks, the duo set to build the largest synthesizer in the world. A few weeks later, they jointly formed a group known as TONTO's Expanding Head Band, through which they explored the nearly unlimited capabilities of their machine. They recorded the album Zero Time (1971), attracting attention from many other leading artists of that era to the newly emerging music technology.

=== Stevie Wonder ===
Beginning in 1972, Margouleff and Cecil worked with Stevie Wonder on a string of award-winning albums, including Music of My Mind (1972), Talking Book (1972), Innervisions (1973) and Fulfillingness' First Finale (1974), all of which featured Margouleff and Cecil as associate producers, engineers and synthesizer programmers.

TONTO was pivotal in the duo's relationship with Wonder because it allowed him to arrange his own tracks and to be involved in each step of the recording process. Over a three-day stretch, the trio recorded 17 songs together for their first release.

Margouleff described the relationship between himself, Cecil and Wonder as "like three meteors in the sky and they're all flying towards one another. For one brief second there's this huge bright light when all three meteors cross paths at the same time and there's just this brilliant flash... and it just goes away. That's how it was with me, Steve, and Malcolm."

=== Post-Wonder ===
In 1975, TONTO's Expanding Head Band resumed with It's About Time and the pair collaborated on Billy Preston's album It's My Pleasure. Margouleff went on to produce music with Jeff Beck, Robin Trower, David Sanborn, Depeche Mode, Oingo Boingo, the Doobie Brothers, Quincy Jones, Bobby Womack, the Isley Brothers, Gil Scott-Heron, Weather Report, Stephen Stills, Dave Mason, Little Feat, Joan Baez, Steve Hillage, Paul Rodgers, Gwar and many others.

In 1980, Margouleff produced the Freedom of Choice album for American new wave band Devo. On working with Margouleff, Devo's co-founder and principal songwriter Gerald Casale said, "He just brought the right kind of tone and energy to the fact that we [were] using mini-Moogs". In an interview for Rhino Records, Casale described how Devo's demos for the album, which featured extensive usage of the Moog Bass, convinced Margouleff to work with them.

=== 1995–present ===
Margouleff is currently a partner in Safe Harbor Pictures LLC. in Los Angeles, California, where he has developed a fully tape-less 2D / 3D High definition production workflow, from shooting to editing. As an avid sailor and documentary filmmaker, Margouleff is producing Tall Ships of the World, a 13-episode series about America's greatest sailing ships, which will be available on Blu-ray in 3D.

In 1997, Margouleff was a principal founder of Mi Casa Multimedia in Hollywood, California, a leading boutique surround sound (multi-channel audio) mixing studio specializing in home theatre DTS and DVD / HD DVD releases for major motion picture studios. Mi Casa Multimedia studios is located in a former home of actor Béla Lugosi.

Margouleff was invited to present as the Keynote Speaker for the 129th AES Convention on November 4, 2010, at the Moscone Center in San Francisco, California. His lecture was titled "What the Hell Happened?", which examined the influence of fast-paced technological developments on creativity in the music industry and the recording arts.

In 2013, the National Music Centre acquired TONTO.

== Personal life ==
Margouleff is the son of Great Neck Estates mayor Jean Margouleff and Ruth Margouleff. He also has one sister and one brother.

== Discography ==
With Malcolm Cecil

- 1971: Zero Time – Tonto's Expanding Head Band
- 1975: It's About Time – Tonto's Expanding Head Band

Engineering, production, programming credits with Cecil

- 1970: A Moog Mass – Caldara
- 1971: The Great Blind Degree – Richie Havens
- 1972: Music of My Mind – Stevie Wonder
- 1972: Talking Book – Stevie Wonder
- 1973: Innervisions – Stevie Wonder
- 1973: The Captain and Me – The Doobie Brothers
- 1973: 3+3 – The Isley Brothers
- 1973: Kindling – Gene Parsons
- 1974: Fulfillingness' First Finale – Stevie Wonder
- 1974: Good Old Boys – Randy Newman
- 1974: Live It Up – The Isley Brothers
- 1974: Shankar Family & Friends – Ravi Shankar
- 1975: It's My Pleasure – Billy Preston
- 1975: The Heat Is On – The Isley Brothers
- 1975: Join Me and Let's Be Free – Wilson Pickett
- 1975: Tale Spinnin' – Weather Report
- 1977: Motivation Radio – Steve Hillage

Credits with other artists
^{(see also Malcolm Cecil Discography, Margouleff and Cecil (together) Discography)}

- 1966/1985: Original Television Soundtrack Star Trek From the Original Pilots "The Cage" & "Where No Man Has Gone Before" – Alexander Courage
- 1968: Presenting... – Lothar and the Hand People
- 1973: Hat Trick – America (synth programming)
- 1976: Billy Preston – Billy Preston
- 1976: 2nd Resurrection – The Stairsteps
- 1977: Ready for the World – Inner Circle
- 1978: Introducing the ARP Avatar – Ned Liben
- 1980: Minimum Wage Rock & Roll – The BusBoys
- 1980: Freedom of Choice – Devo
- 1982: As We Speak – David Sanborn
- 1982: The Innocents – The Innocents
- 1982: Rumor Has It EP – Avalon
- 1983: Good for Your Soul – Oingo Boingo
- 1986: "All I Need" – The Manhattans (additional producer, remix)
- 1986: "But Not Tonight" – Depeche Mode (additional producer, remix)
- 1987: Renaissance – Branford Marsalis
- 1987: American Soul Man – Wilson Pickett
- 1990: The Odd Get Even – Shadowfax
- 1991: Live in Concert – 2 Live Crew
- 1992: Freedom to Fly – Tony MacAlpine
- 1994: Alternative NRG – various artists
- 1995: Conversation Peace – Stevie Wonder (mixing)

== Awards and recognition ==
- Grammy Award for Best Engineered Album, Non-Classical – 1974
  - Malcolm Cecil & Robert Margouleff (engineers) for Innervisions performed by Stevie Wonder
