= At the Close of a Century =

Greatest hits album by Stevie Wonder
- Released: November 23, 1999
- Recorded: 1962–1997
- Genres: R&B, soul
- Label: Motown
- Producers: Harry Weinger; Stevie Wonder; Robert Margouleff; Malcolm Cecil; Mickey Stevenson; Clarence Paul; Hank Cosby; Don Hunter; Ron Miller

Stevie Wonder chronology
Song Review: A Greatest Hits Collection (1996)	At the Close of a Century (1999)	The Definitive Collection (2002)

Professional ratings
Review scores
Source	Rating
Allmusic	5/5 stars
Los Angeles Times	4/4 stars
Rolling Stone	5/5 stars

At the Close of a Century is a box-set album of Stevie Wonder's greatest hits from the 1960s through the 1990s. The box set spans four CDs and the songs are placed in chronological order. It features nearly all of his most critically acclaimed songs, singles and album tracks alike. It reached #100 on the Billboard Top R&B/Hip-Hop Albums chart in 2000. The box set encompasses a total of 70 songs, including every track from Wonder's 1973 album Innervisions except for "Jesus Children of America."

== Track listing ==
=== Disc 1 ===
No.	Title	Writer(s)	Original album	Length
1.	"Fingertips (Pts. 1 & 2)"	Henry Cosby, Clarence Paul	Recorded Live: The 12 Year Old Genius, 1963	6:55
2.	"Uptight (Everything's Alright)"	Stevie Wonder, Sylvia Moy, Cosby	Up Tight, 1966	2:53
3.	"Nothing's Too Good for My Baby"	Cosby, Moy, William "Mickey" Stevenson	Up Tight	2:38
4.	"Blowin' in the Wind" (Bob Dylan cover)	Bob Dylan	Up Tight	3:43
5.	"A Place in the Sun"	Ron Miller, Bryan Wells	Down to Earth, 1966	2:45
6.	"Hey Love"	Morris Broadnax, Paul, Wonder	Down to Earth	2:45
7.	"I Was Made to Love Her"	Wonder, Cosby, Moy, Lula Mae Hardaway	I Was Made to Love Her, 1967	2:37
8.	"Until You Come Back to Me (That's What I'm Gonna Do)"	Broadnax, Paul, Wonder	Looking Back, 1977; originally recorded in 1967	3:01
9.	"I'm Wondering"	Wonder, Cosby, Moy	Non-album single, 1967	2:55
10.	"Shoo-Be-Doo-Be-Doo-Da-Day"	Wonder, Moy, Cosby	For Once in My Life, 1968	2:46
11.	"You Met Your Match"	Hardaway, Don Hunter, Wonder	For Once in My Life	2:38
12.	"For Once in My Life"	Miller, Orlando Murden	For Once in My Life	2:50
13.	"I Don't Know Why"	Hardaway, Hunter, Paul Riser, Wonder	For Once in My Life	2:45
14.	"My Cherie Amour"	Cosby, Moy, Wonder	My Cherie Amour, 1969	2:50
15.	"Yester-Me, Yester-You, Yesterday"	Miller, Wells	My Cherie Amour	3:04
16.	"Never Had a Dream Come True"	Cosby, Moy, Wonder	Signed, Sealed & Delivered, 1970	3:13
17.	"Signed, Sealed, Delivered I'm Yours"	Lee Garrett, Hardaway, Wonder, Syreeta Wright	Signed, Sealed & Delivered	2:40
18.	"Heaven Help Us All"	Miller	Signed, Sealed & Delivered	3:15
19.	"We Can Work It Out" (The Beatles cover)	John Lennon, Paul McCartney	Signed, Sealed & Delivered	3:17
20.	"If You Really Love Me"	Wonder, S. Wright	Where I'm Coming From, 1971	2:56
21.	"Never Dreamed You'd Leave in Summer"	Wonder, S. Wright	Where I'm Coming From	2:56
22.	"Superwoman (Where Were You When I Needed You)"	Wonder	Music of My Mind, 1972	8:07
23.	"I Love Every Little Thing About You"	Wonder	Music of My Mind	3:55

=== Disc 2 ===
All tracks are written by Stevie Wonder, except "I Believe (When I Fall in Love It Will Be Forever)", written by Wonder and Yvonne Wright.

No.	Title	Original album	Length
1.	"Superstition"	Talking Book, 1972	4:26
2.	"You Are the Sunshine of My Life"	Talking Book	2:55
3.	"You and I"	Talking Book	4:34
4.	"I Believe (When I Fall in Love It Will Be Forever)"	Talking Book	4:52
5.	"Too High"	Innervisions, 1973	4:36
6.	"Visions"	Innervisions	5:23
7.	"Living for the City"	Innervisions	7:23
8.	"Golden Lady"	Innervisions	4:47
9.	"Higher Ground"	Innervisions	3:42
10.	"All in Love Is Fair"	Innervisions	3:43
11.	"Don't You Worry 'bout a Thing"	Innervisions	4:45
12.	"He's Misstra Know-It-All"	Innervisions	5:36
13.	"You Haven't Done Nothin'"	Fulfillingness' First Finale, 1974	3:29
14.	"Heaven Is 10 Zillion Light Years Away"	Fulfillingness' First Finale	5:02
15.	"Too Shy to Say"	Fulfillingness' First Finale	3:29
16.	"Boogie On Reggae Woman"	Fulfillingness' First Finale	4:55
17.	"Creepin'"	Fulfillingness' First Finale	4:20

=== Disc 3 ===
All tracks are written by Stevie Wonder, except "All I Do", written by Wonder, Paul and Broadnax.

No.	Title	Original album	Length
1.	"Sir Duke"	Songs in the Key of Life, 1976	3:51
2.	"I Wish"	Songs in the Key of Life	4:12
3.	"Knocks Me Off My Feet"	Songs in the Key of Life	3:36
4.	"Pastime Paradise"	Songs in the Key of Life	3:27
5.	"Isn't She Lovely"	Songs in the Key of Life	6:36
6.	"Ngiculela ~ Es Una Historia ~ I Am Singing"	Songs in the Key of Life	3:48
7.	"If It's Magic"	Songs in the Key of Life	3:12
8.	"As"	Songs in the Key of Life	7:09
9.	"Another Star"	Songs in the Key of Life	8:22
10.	"Send One Your Love"	Stevie Wonder's Journey Through "The Secret Life of Plants", 1979	4:01
11.	"All I Do"	Hotter than July, 1980	5:16
12.	"Rocket Love"	Hotter than July	4:39
13.	"I Ain't Gonna Stand for It"	Hotter than July	4:39
14.	"Master Blaster (Jammin')"	Hotter than July	5:11
15.	"Lately"	Hotter than July	4:05
16.	"Happy Birthday"	Hotter than July	5:58

=== Disc 4 ===
All tracks are written by Stevie Wonder, except "How Come, How Long", written by Kenneth "Babyface" Edmonds and Wonder.

No.	Title	Original album	Length
1.	"That Girl"	Stevie Wonder's Original Musiquarium I, 1982	5:13
2.	"Ribbon in the Sky"	Stevie Wonder's Original Musiquarium I	5:40
3.	"Do I Do"	Stevie Wonder's Original Musiquarium I	10:30
4.	"Love Light in Flight"	Selections from the Original Motion Picture Soundtrack "The Woman in Red", 1984	6:54
5.	"I Just Called to Say I Love You" (Single version)	Selections from the Original Motion Picture Soundtrack "The Woman in Red"	4:22
6.	"Overjoyed"	In Square Circle, 1985	3:42
7.	"Part-Time Lover"	In Square Circle	4:12
8.	"Go Home"	In Square Circle	5:19
9.	"You Will Know"	Characters, 1987	5:02
10.	"Skeletons"	Characters	5:24
11.	"Gotta Have You"	Jungle Fever: Music from the Movie, 1991	6:26
12.	"These Three Words"	Jungle Fever: Music from the Movie	4:54
13.	"For Your Love"	Conversation Peace, 1995	5:01
14.	"How Come, How Long" (Babyface feat. Stevie Wonder)	The Day, 1996	5:15
