= Stevie Wonder discography =

Discography of the American musician

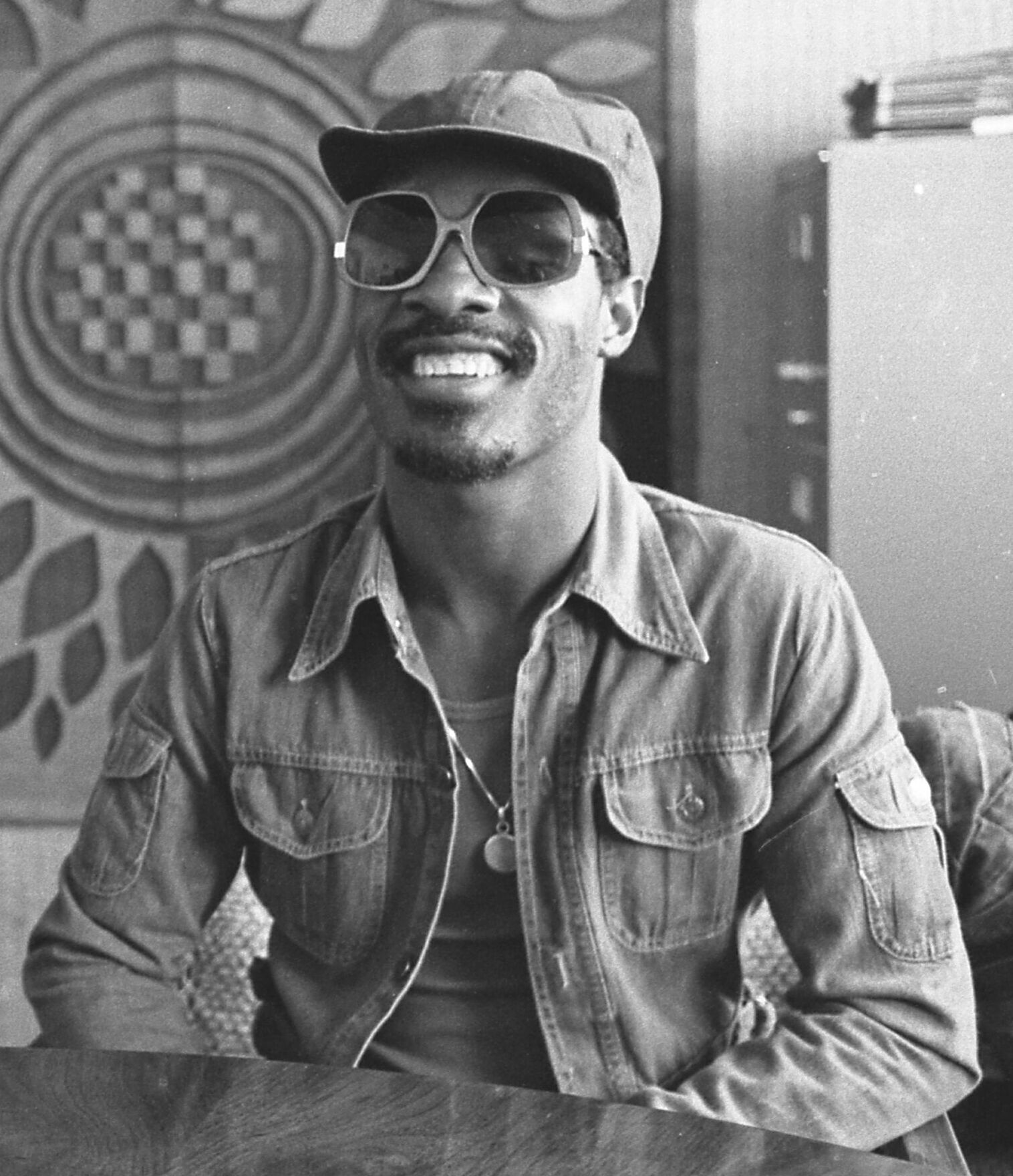
- Stevie Wonder in 1975
- Studio albums: 23
- Extended plays: 1
- Soundtrack albums: 3
- Live albums: 4
- Compilation albums: 11
- Singles: 92
- Music videos: 20
- Other albums: 1

American musician Stevie Wonder has released 23 studio albums, three soundtrack albums, four live albums, 11 compilations, one box set, and 91 singles. His first album, The Jazz Soul of Little Stevie, was released in 1962 when he was 12 years old, and his most recent, A Time to Love, was released in 2005. Wonder has had ten US number-one hits on the pop charts, as well as 20 R&B number one hits, and has sold over 100 million records, 22.5 million of which are albums; he is one of the top best-selling music artists of all time with combined sales of singles and albums. Wonder has 30 main album releases, all of which are single albums, apart from Songs in the Key of Life, which was released as a double album with a bonus four-track EP, and his subsequent double album Journey through the Secret Life of Plants. There are 11 official compilation albums; in addition, a box set, The Complete Stevie Wonder, was released in 2005. Wonder is eighth on the list of artists with the most number-ones on the US Billboard Hot 100.

Wonder's critical success was at its peak in the 1970s. His "classic period" began in 1972 with the releases of Music of My Mind and Talking Book, the latter featuring "Superstition", which is one of the most distinctive and famous examples of the sound of the Hohner Clavinet keyboard. His works Innervisions (1973), Fulfillingness' First Finale (1974) and Songs in the Key of Life (1976) all won the Grammy Award for Album of the Year, making him the only artist to have won the award with three consecutive album releases. Wonder began his "commercial period" in the 1980s; he achieved his biggest hits and highest level of fame, had increased album sales, charity participation, high-profile collaborations (including with Paul McCartney and Michael Jackson), political impact, and television appearances. Wonder has continued to remain active in music and political causes.

Wonder is one of the best-selling music artists of all time, with sales of over 100 million records worldwide. He has won 25 Grammy Awards (the most by a male solo artist) and one Academy Award (Best Original Song, for the 1984 film The Woman in Red). Wonder has been inducted into the Rhythm and Blues Music Hall of Fame, Rock and Roll Hall of Fame and Songwriters Hall of Fame.

== Albums ==
=== Studio albums ===
List of studio albums, with selected details, peak chart positions and certifications
Title	Album details	Peak chart positions											Certifications (sales thresholds)
Title	Album details	US	US R&B	AUS	AUT	CAN	GER	NOR	NZ	SWE	SWI	UK	Certifications (sales thresholds)
The Jazz Soul of Little Stevie	Released: September 1962; Label: Tamla	—	—	—	—	—	—	—	—	—	—	—	
Tribute to Uncle Ray	Released: October 1962; Label: Tamla	—	—	—	—	—	—	—	—	—	—	—	
With a Song in My Heart	Released: December 28, 1963; Label: Tamla	—	—	—	—	—	—	—	—	—	—	—	
Stevie at the Beach	Released: June 23, 1964; Label: Tamla	—	—	—	—	—	—	—	—	—	—	—	
Up-Tight	Released: May 4, 1966; Label: Tamla	33	2	—	—	—	—	—	—	—	—	14	
Down to Earth	Released: November 16, 1966; Label: Tamla	92	8	—	—	—	—	—	—	—	—	—	
I Was Made to Love Her	Released: August 27, 1967; Label: Tamla	45	7	—	—	—	—	—	—	—	—	—	
Someday at Christmas	Released: November 27, 1967; Label: Tamla	81	—	—	—	—	70	—	—	—	—	—	
Eivets Rednow	Released: November 20, 1968; Label: Gordy	—	37	—	—	—	—	—	—	—	—	—	
For Once in My Life	Released: December 8, 1968; Label: Tamla	50	4	—	—	—	—	—	—	—	—	—	
My Cherie Amour	Released: August 29, 1969; Label: Tamla	34	3	—	—	37	—	—	—	—	—	17	
Signed, Sealed & Delivered	Released: August 7, 1970; Label: Tamla	25	7	—	—	—	—	—	—	—	—	—	
Where I'm Coming From	Released: April 9, 1971; Label: Tamla	62	7	—	—	—	—	—	—	—	—	—	
Music of My Mind	Released: March 3, 1972; Label: Tamla	21	6	—	—	—	—	—	—	—	—	—	
Talking Book	Released: October 28, 1972; Label: Tamla	3	1	34	—	12	—	24	—	—	—	16	CAN: Gold; UK: Gold
Innervisions	Released: August 3, 1973; Label: Tamla	4	1	26	—	11	—	—	—	—	—	8	CAN: Gold; UK: Gold
Fulfillingness' First Finale	Released: July 22, 1974; Label: Tamla	1	1	19	—	1	32	—	—	—	—	5	CAN: Platinum; UK: Gold
Songs in the Key of Life	Released: September 28, 1976; Label: Tamla	1	1	6	15	1	23	6	5	9	—	2	US: Diamond; ARIA: Platinum; CAN: 2× Platinum; UK: Platinum
Hotter than July	Released: September 29, 1980; Label: Tamla	3	1	3	2	18	12	5	2	3	—	2	US: Platinum; AUS: 3× Platinum; CAN: Platinum; UK: Platinum
In Square Circle	Released: September 13, 1985; Label: Tamla	5	1	8	12	7	8	3	7	2	4	5	US: 2× Platinum; CAN: 2× Platinum; UK: Gold
Characters	Released: November 6, 1987; Label: Motown	17	1	23	21	31	55	—	—	16	23	33	US: Platinum; UK: Gold
Conversation Peace	Released: March 21, 1995; Label: Motown	16	2	81	17	48	34	23	15	—	28	8	US: Gold
Workout Stevie Workout	Released: October 12, 2005 (as part of The Complete Stevie Wonder); Label: Tamla	—	—	—	—	—	—	—	—	—	—	—	
A Time to Love	Released: October 18, 2005; Label: Motown	5	2	61	—	52	43	9	—	9	24	24	US: Gold; UK: Silver
"—" denotes a recording that did not chart or was not released in that territory.

=== Soundtrack albums ===
List of soundtrack albums
Title	Album details
Stevie Wonder's Journey Through "The Secret Life of Plants"	Released: October 30, 1979; Label: Tamla; Formats: CD, cassette
The Woman in Red	Released: August 28, 1984; Label: Motown; Formats: CD, cassette
Jungle Fever	Released: May 28, 1991; Label: Motown; Formats: CD, cassette

=== Compilation albums ===
List of compilation albums, with selected details, peak chart positions and certifications
Title	Album details	Peak chart positions											Certifications (sales thresholds)
Title	Album details	US	US R&B	AUS	AUT	CAN	GER	NOR	NZ	SWE	SWI	UK	Certifications (sales thresholds)
Greatest Hits	Released: March 25, 1968; Label: Tamla	37	6	—	—	—	—	—	—	—	—	25	
Stevie Wonder's Greatest Hits Vol. 2	Released: October 21, 1971; Label: Tamla	69	10	—	—	—	—	—	—	—	—	30	
Uptight (Everything's Alright)	Released: 1973; Label: Sounds Superb (UK budget label)	—	—	—	—	—	—	—	—	—	—	—	
Looking Back	Released: November 30, 1977; Label: Tamla	34	15	—	—	31	—	—	—	—	—	—	CAN: Gold
Stevie Wonder's Original Musiquarium I	Released: May 4, 1982; Label: Tamla	4	1	9	15	18	33	—	5	19	—	8	US: Gold; AUS: Gold; UK: Gold
Love Songs: 16 Classic Hits	Released: November 1984; Label: Telstar	—	—	—	—	—	—	—	—	—	—	20	UK: Gold
Love Songs: 20 Classic Hits	Released: February 1985; Label: Tamla	—	—	24	—	—	—	—	—	—	—	—	
Song Review: A Greatest Hits Collection	Released: November 1996; Label: Motown	—	100	4	32	—	53	19	12	6	15	19	US: Platinum; AUS: Platinum; SWI: Gold; UK: Platinum
The Ballad Collection	Released: November 1999; Label: Motown	—	—	—	—	—	—	—	—	—	—	—	
At the Close of a Century	Released: November 1999; Label: Motown	—	100	—	—	—	—	—	—	—	—	—	US: Gold
The Definitive Collection	Released: October 2002; Label: Motown	35	28	66	—	—	—	3	—	2	31	11	US: 4× Platinum; SWE: Gold; UK: 6× Platinum
Conception	Released: March 18. 2003; Label: Motown	—	—	—	—	—	—	—	—	—	—	—	
The Best of Stevie Wonder: 20th Century Masters The Christmas Collection	Released: December 2004; Label: Motown	68	90	—	—	89	—	—	—	—	—	—	
20th Century Masters – The Millennium Collection: The Best of Stevie Wonder	Released: March 2005; Label: Motown	—	—	—	—	—	—	—	—	—	—	—	UK: Silver
The Complete Stevie Wonder	Released: October 2005; Label: Motown	—	—	—	—	—	—	—	—	—	—	—	
Number Ones	Released: October 2007; Label: Motown	171	40	89	—	—	—	—	18	33	—	23	UK: Gold
Fantastic Music for Christmas (All the Greatest Tracks)	Released: November 2016; Label: Classic Mood Experience	—	—	—	—	—	—	—	—	—	—	—	
The Best of Christmas (Fantastic Relaxing Songs)	Released: December 2016; Label: Classic Mood Experience	—	—	—	—	—	—	—	—	—	—	—	
"—" denotes a recording that did not chart or was not released in that territory.

=== Live albums ===
List of live albums, with selected details, peak chart positions and certifications
Title	Album details	Peak chart positions			
Title	Album details	US	US R&B	CAN	NZ
Recorded Live: The 12 Year Old Genius	Released: May 21, 1963; Label: Tamla	1	—	—	—
Stevie Wonder Live	Released: January 1970; Label: Tamla	81	16	83	—
Live at the Talk of The Town	Released: March 6, 1970; Label: Tamla	—	—	—	—
Natural Wonder	Released: November 21, 1995; Label: Motown	—	88	—	32
"—" denotes a recording that did not chart or was not released in that territory.

== Extended plays ==
List of extended plays
Title	Album details
Songs in the Key of Life – The EP	Released: September 28, 2026; Label: Motown

== Singles ==
=== 1962–1969 ===
List of 1960s singles, with selected peak chart positions and certifications
Title (A-side) (B-side) Both sides from same album except where indicated	Year	Peak chart positions											Certifications	Album
Title (A-side) (B-side) Both sides from same album except where indicated	Year	US	US R&B	US AC	BEL	AUS	CAN	GER	IRE	NZ	SWI	UK	Certifications	Album
"I Call It Pretty Music but the Old People Call It the Blues – Part 1" b/w Part 2	1962	—	—	—	—	—	—	—	—	—	—	—		Non-album singles
"La La La La La" b/w "Little Water Boy"	1962	—	—	—	—	—	—	—	—	—	—	—		Non-album singles
"Contract on Love" b/w "Sunset" (from Tribute to Uncle Ray)	1962	—	—	—	—	—	—	—	—	—	—	—		Up-Tight
"Fingertips – Part 2" b/w Part 1	1963	1	1	—	—	54	6	—	—	—	—	—		The 12 Year Old Genius – Recorded Live
"Workout Stevie, Workout" b/w "Monkey Talk" (Non-album track)	1963	33	—	—	—	—	34	—	—	—	—	—		Greatest Hits
"Pretty Little Angel" b/w "Tears in Vain" (Non-album track)	1964	—	—	—	—	—	—	—	—	—	—	—		Up-Tight
"Castles in the Sand" b/w "Thank You (For Loving Me All the Way)" (from Looking Back) The above seven tracks released as Little Stevie Wonder	1964	52	6	—	—	—	—	—	—	—	—	—		Stevie at the Beach
"Hey Harmonica Man" b/w "This Little Girl" (Non-album track)	1964	29	5	—	—	—	—	—	—	—	—	—		Stevie at the Beach
"Happy Street" b/w "Sad Boy"	1964	—	—	—	—	—	—	—	—	—	—	—		Stevie at the Beach
"Kiss Me Baby" b/w "Tears in Vain"	1965	—	—	—	—	—	—	—	—	—	—	—		Non-album single
"High Heel Sneakers" b/w "Funny How Time Slips Away" (on first pressings) "Music Talk" (on later pressings) (from Up-Tight)	1965	59	30	—	—	—	—	—	—	—	—	—		Recorded Live/Motortown Revue in Paris
"Uptight (Everything's Alright)" b/w "Purple Rain Drops" (Non-album track)	1965	3	1	—	—	91	—	—	—	—	—	14	UK: Gold	Up-Tight
"Nothing's Too Good for My Baby" b/w "With a Child's Heart"	1966	20	4	—	—	—	71	—	—	—	—	—		Up-Tight
"With a Child's Heart" b-side of "Nothing's Too Good for My Baby"	1966	131	8	—	—	—	—	—	—	—	—	—		Up-Tight
"Blowin' in the Wind" b/w "Ain't That Asking for Trouble"	1966	9	1	—	—	60	12	—	—	—	—	36		Up-Tight
"A Place in the Sun" b/w "Sylvia"	1966	9	3	29	—	—	5	—	—	—	—	20		Down to Earth
"Someday at Christmas" b/w "The Miracle of Christmas" (Non-album track, later included on Someday at Christmas (expanded edition) (2003))	1966	—	—	—	—	—	—	56	—	—	—	—		Someday at Christmas
"Travlin' Man" b/w "Hey Love" (from Down to Earth)	1967	32	31	—	—	—	36	—	—	—	—	—		Stevie Wonder's Greatest Hits Vol. 2
"Hey Love" b-side of "Travelin' Man" (from Stevie Wonder's Greatest Hits Vol. 2)	1967	90	9	—	—	—	—	—	—	—	—	—		Down to Earth
"I Was Made to Love Her" b/w "Hold Me" (from Up-Tight)	1967	2	1	—	—	26	5	—	—	16	—	5		I Was Made to Love Her
"I'm Wondering" b/w "Every Time I See You I Go Wild" (from I Was Made to Love Her)	1967	12	4	—	—	—	7	—	—	—	—	22		Greatest Hits
"Shoo-Be-Doo-Be-Doo-Da-Day" b/w "Why Don't You Lead Me to Love" (Non-album track)	1968	9	1	—	—	—	9	—	—	—	—	46		For Once in My Life
"You Met Your Match" b/w "My Girl" (from I Was Made to Love Her)	1968	35	2	—	—	—	28	—	—	—	—	—		For Once in My Life
"Alfie" b/w "More Than a Dream"	1968	66	—	11	—	—	83	—	—	—	—	—		Eivets Rednow
"For Once in My Life" b/w "Angie Girl" (from My Cherie Amour)	1968	2	2	—	—	24	5	—	11	—	—	3	UK: Platinum	For Once in My Life
"I Don't Know Why" b/w "My Cherie Amour" (from My Cherie Amour)	1969	39	16	—	—	—	41	—	—	—	—	14		For Once in My Life
"My Cherie Amour" b/w "I Don't Know Why" from For Once in My Life	1969	4	4	3	—	75	14	—	9	—	—	4	UK: Silver	My Cherie Amour
"Yester-Me, Yester-You, Yesterday" b/w "I'd Be a Fool Right Now" (from For Once in My Life)	1969	7	5	10	7	11	10	15	3	10	10	2		My Cherie Amour
"—" denotes a recording that did not chart or was not released in that territory.

=== 1970–1979 ===
List of 1970s singles, with selected peak chart positions and certifications
Title (A-side) (B-side) Both sides from same album except where indicated	Year	Peak chart positions											Certifications	Album
Title (A-side) (B-side) Both sides from same album except where indicated	Year	US	US R&B	US AC	AUS	BEL	CAN	GER	IRE	NZ	SWI	UK	Certifications	Album
"Never Had a Dream Come True" b/w "Somebody Knows, Somebody Cares" (from My Cherie Amour)	1970	26	11	31	67	—	22	—	14	—	—	6		Signed, Sealed & Delivered
"Signed, Sealed, Delivered I'm Yours" b/w "I'm More Than Happy (I'm Satisfied)" (from For Once in My Life)	1970	3	1	—	50	—	19	—	—	—	—	15	UK: Platinum	Signed, Sealed & Delivered
"Heaven Help Us All" b/w "I Gotta Have a Song"	1970	9	2	—	88	—	14	—	—	—	—	29		Signed, Sealed & Delivered
"We Can Work It Out"	1971	13	3	—	—	—	49	—	—	—	—	27		Signed, Sealed & Delivered
"Never Dreamed You'd Leave in Summer"	1971	78	—	—	—	—	—	—	—	—	—	—		Where I'm Coming From
"If You Really Love Me" b/w "Think of Me as Your Soldier"	1971	8	4	10	—	—	60	—	—	—	—	20		Where I'm Coming From
"What Christmas Means to Me" b/w "Bedtime for Toys"	1971	—	—	—	—	—	—	—	—	—	72	57	UK: Gold	Someday at Christmas
"Superwoman (Where Were You When I Needed You)" b/w "I Love Every Little Thing About You"	1972	33	13	—	—	—	53	—	—	—	—	—		Music of My Mind
"Keep On Running" b/w "Evil"	1972	90	36	—	—	—	—	—	—	—	—	—		Music of My Mind
"Superstition" b/w "You Got It Bad Girl"	1972	1	1	38	95	16	6	21	—	—	—	11	UK: 4× Platinum	Talking Book
"You Are the Sunshine of My Life" b/w "Tuesday Heartbreak"	1973	1	3	1	10	—	5	42	—	8	—	7	UK: Silver	Talking Book
"Higher Ground" b/w "Too High"	1973	4	1	—	62	—	9	—	—	—	—	29	UK: Silver	Innervisions
"Living for the City" b/w "Visions"	1973	8	1	—	95	—	17	20	—	18	—	15		Innervisions
"Don't You Worry 'bout a Thing" b/w "Blame It on the Sun" (from Talking Book)	1974	16	2	—	—	—	13	—	—	—	—	—		Innervisions
"He's Misstra Know It All" b/w "You Can't Judge a Book by Its Cover" (from Signed Sealed & Delivered)	1974	—	—	—	68	—	—	—	—	18	—	10		Innervisions
"You Haven't Done Nothin'" b/w "Big Brother" (from Talking Book)	1974	1	1	—	86	—	1	49	—	—	—	30		Fulfillingness' First Finale
"Boogie On Reggae Woman" b/w "Seems So Long" (from Music of My Mind)	1974	3	1	—	71	—	8	—	—	—	—	12		Fulfillingness' First Finale
"I Wish" b/w "You and I" (from Talking Book)	1976	1	1	—	51	10	1	30	5	19	—	5	UK: Silver	Songs in the Key of Life
"Isn't She Lovely" b/w instrumental version of A-side	1976	—	—	23	—	—	—	—	—	—	—	94 (Note: "Isn't She Lovely" was not released as a physical single in the UK, but charted from downloads in June 2012.)	US: Gold; UK: Platinum	Songs in the Key of Life
"Sir Duke" b/w "He's Misstra Know-It-All" (from Innervisions)	1977	1	1	3	69	22	1	10	—	24	4	2	CAN: Gold; UK: Platinum	Songs in the Key of Life
"Another Star" b/w "Creepin'" (from Fulfillingness' First Finale)	1977	32	18	29	—	—	34	—	—	—	—	29		Songs in the Key of Life
"As" b/w "Contusion"	1977	36	36	24	—	—	51	—	—	—	—	—	UK: Silver	Songs in the Key of Life
"Pops, We Love You" (with Diana Ross, Smokey Robinson & Marvin Gaye) b/w Instrumental version of A-side	1978	59	26	—	—	—	60	—	—	—	—	66		"Pops We Love You"...The Album (Various Motown artists)
"Send One Your Love" b/w Instrumental version of A-side	1979	4	5	1	52	—	7	—	—	29	—	52		Stevie Wonder's Journey Through "The Secret Life of Plants"
"—" denotes a recording that did not chart or was not released in that territory.

=== 1980–1989 ===
List of 1980s singles, with selected peak chart positions and certifications
Single (A-side, B-side) Both sides from same album except where indicated	Year	Peak chart positions												Certifications	Album
Single (A-side, B-side) Both sides from same album except where indicated	Year	US	US R&B	US AC	AUS	BEL	CAN	FRA	GER	IRE	NZ	SWI	UK	Certifications	Album
"Black Orchid" b/w "Blame It on the Sun" (from Talking Book)	1980	—	—	—	—	—	—	—	—	—	—	—	63		Stevie Wonder's Journey Through "The Secret Life of Plants"
"Outside My Window" b/w "Same Old Story"	1980	52	56	43	—	—	77	—	—	—	—	—	52		Stevie Wonder's Journey Through "The Secret Life of Plants"
"Master Blaster (Jammin')" b/w "Master Blaster" (Dub) (Non-album track)	1980	5	1	—	2	3	22	—	9	3	1	1	2	AUS: Gold; CAN: Gold; UK: Gold	Hotter than July
"I Ain't Gonna Stand for It" b/w "Knocks Me Off My Feet" (from Songs in the Key of Life)	1980	11	4	20	61	—	9	—	50	6	2	—	10		Hotter than July
"Lately" b/w "If It's Magic" (from Songs in the Key of Life)	1981	64	29	33	17	—	—	—	64	6	15	—	3	UK: Silver	Hotter than July
"Happy Birthday" b/w Sing-along version of A-side (Non-album track)	1981	—	70	—	31	13	—	—	18	5	23	8	2	GER: Gold; UK: Platinum	Hotter than July
"Did I Hear You Say You Love Me" b/w "As If You Read My Mind"	1981	—	74	—	—	—	—	—	—	—	—	—	—		Hotter than July
"That Girl" b/w "All I Do" (from Hotter Than July)	1982	4	1	10	31	20	—	—	—	—	20	—	39		Stevie Wonder's Original Musiquarium I
"Do I Do" b/w "Rocket Love" (from Hotter Than July)	1982	13	2	25	66	32	—	—	—	8	9	—	10		Stevie Wonder's Original Musiquarium I
"Ribbon in the Sky" b/w "Black Orchid" (from Journey Through the Secret Life of Plants)	1982	54	10	21	—	—	—	—	—	—	—	—	45		Stevie Wonder's Original Musiquarium I
"Used to Be" (with Charlene) b/w "I Want to Come Back as a Song*	1982	46	35	31	71	—	—	—	—	—	—	13	—		Used to Be (Charlene album)
"Front Line" b/w Instrumental version of A-side (Non-album track)	1983	—	—	—	—	—	—	—	—	—	—	—	94		Stevie Wonder's Original Musiquarium I
"I Just Called to Say I Love You" b/w Instrumental version of A-side (Non-album track)	1984	1	1	1	1	1	1	1	1	1	1	1	1	US: Gold; CAN: 3× Platinum; GER: Gold; UK: Platinum	Selections from the Original Motion Picture Soundtrack "The Woman in Red"
"Love Light in Flight" b/w "It's More Than You" (Instrumental)	1984	17	4	10	—	27	39	—	54	—	43	—	44		Selections from the Original Motion Picture Soundtrack "The Woman in Red"
"Don't Drive Drunk" b/w Instrumental version of A-side (Non-album track)	1984	—	—	—	—	—	—	—	—	—	—	—	62		Selections from the Original Motion Picture Soundtrack "The Woman in Red"
"Part-Time Lover" b/w Instrumental version of A-side (Non-album track)	1985	1	1	1	3	1	1	3	12	1	1	5	3	UK: Silver	In Square Circle
"Go Home" b/w Instrumental version of A-side (Non-album track)	1985	10	2	1	92	25	31	—	—	—	—	—	67		In Square Circle
"Overjoyed" b/w Instrumental version of A-side (Non-album track)	1986	24	8	1	—	33	55	—	—	10	—	—	17		In Square Circle
"Land of La La" b/w Instrumental version of A-side (Non-album track)	1986	86	19	—	—	—	—	—	—	—	—	—	—		In Square Circle
"Stranger on the Shore of Love" b/w "Did I Hear You Say You Love Me" (from Hotter Than July)	1986	—	—	—	—	—	—	—	—	—	—	—	55		In Square Circle
"Skeletons" b/w Instrumental version of A-side (Non-album track)	1987	19	1	—	38	36	43	—	—	—	39	—	59		Characters
"You Will Know" b/w Instrumental version of A-side (Non-album track)	1987	77	1	16	—	—	—	—	—	—	—	—	77		Characters
"Get It" (with Michael Jackson) b/w Instrumental version of A-side (Non-album track)	1987	80	4	—	—	15	—	49	—	16	—	—	37		Characters
"My Eyes Don't Cry" b/w Instrumental version of A-side (Non-album track)	1988	—	6	—	—	—	—	—	—	—	—	—	92		Characters
"With Each Beat of My Heart" b/w Instrumental version of A-side (Non-album track)	1989	—	28	—	—	—	—	—	—	—	—	—	—		Characters
"Free" b/w "Happy Birthday" (from Hotter Than July)	1989	—	—	—	—	26	—	36	—	—	—	—	49		Characters
"—" denotes a recording that did not chart or was not released in that territory.

=== 1990–present ===
List of singles from the 1990s to the present, with selected peak chart positions and certifications
Title	Year	Peak chart positions										Certifications	Album
Title	Year	US	US R&B	US AC	BEL	CAN	GER	IRE	NZ	SWI	UK	Certifications	Album
"Keep Our Love Alive" b/w Instrumental version of A-side	1990	—	24	—	—	78	—	—	—	—	77		Non-album single
"Gotta Have You" b/w "Feeding Off the Love of the Land" (Nobody's Child)	1991	92	3	—	—	—	—	—	—	—	93		Jungle Fever: Music from the Movie
"Fun Day" b/w Instrumental version of A-side (Non-album track)	1991	—	6	—	—	—	—	—	—	—	63		Jungle Fever: Music from the Movie
"These Three Words" b/w instrumental	1991	—	7	—	—	—	—	—	—	—	—		Jungle Fever: Music from the Movie
"We Didn't Know" (with Whitney Houston) b/w "Lover for Life"	1992	—	20	—	—	—	—	—	—	—	—		I'm Your Baby Tonight
"For Your Love" b/w Instrumental version of A-side (Non-album track)	1995	53	11	30	—	12	63	—	10	—	23		Conversation Peace
"Tomorrow Robins Will Sing" b/w "For Your Love"	1995	—	60	—	—	—	—	—	—	—	71		Conversation Peace
"Treat Myself" CD single with three versions	1995	—	92	—	—	—	—	—	—	—	—		Conversation Peace
"Kiss Lonely Good-Bye" CD single with five versions	1996	—	—	—	—	—	—	—	—	—	—		The Adventures of Pinocchio soundtrack
"How Come, How Long" (with Babyface) b/w "Every Time I Close My Eyes" (Timbaland remix)	1997	—	—	—	15	—	17	10	9	10	10		The Day (Babyface album)
"True to Your Heart" (with 98 Degrees) CD single, also includes two tracks by 98 Degrees	1998	—	—	—	31	50	52	—	—	25	51		Mulan: An Original Walt Disney Records Soundtrack
"To Feel the Fire"	1998	—	—	—	—	—	—	—	—	—	—		non-album single
"So What the Fuss" (with Prince and En Vogue) CD single with four versions	2005	96	34	40	—	—	—	37	—	46	19		A Time to Love
"Positivity" (with Aisha Morris) CD single, also includes 12" versions of "Master Blaster (Jammin')" and "Happy Birthday"	2005	—	—	—	—	—	—	—	—	—	54		A Time to Love
"From the Bottom of My Heart" CD single with two versions	2006	—	52	25	—	—	—	—	—	—	—		A Time to Love
"Shelter in the Rain" CD single	2006	—	93	—	—	—	—	—	—	—	—		A Time to Love
"All About the Love Again" CD single	2009	—	56	—	—	—	—	—	—	—	—		Change Is Now: Renewing America's Promise
"Faith" (featuring Ariana Grande)	2016	—	—	—	89	—	—	—	—	—	—	UK: Silver	Sing: Original Motion Picture Soundtrack
"Real Love" (with Byron Miller and Walter Beasley)	2020	—	—	—	—	—	—	—	—	—	—		Non-album singles
"Where Is Our Love Song" (featuring Gary Clark Jr.)	2020	—	21	23	—	—	—	—	—	—	—		Non-album singles
"Can't Put It in the Hands of Fate" (featuring Rapsody, Cordae, Chika and Busta Rhymes)	2020	—	—	—	—	—	—	—	—	—	—		Non-album singles
"Don't Make Me Wait Too Long" (featuring Kimberly Brewer and Joe)	2023	—	—	—	—	—	—	—	—	—	—		Non-album singles
"Can We Fix Our Nation's Broken Heart"	2024	—	—	—	—	—	—	—	—	—	—		Non-album singles
"—" denotes a recording that did not chart or was not released in that territory.

== Music videos ==
- "My Cherie Amour" (1969)
- "You Are the Sunshine of My Life" (1973)
- "All In Love Is Fair" (1973)
- "Send One Your Love" (1979)
- "Master Blaster (Jammin')" (1980)
- "Lately" (1981)
- "Do I Do" (1982)
- "Ebony & Ivory" (1982)
- "Ribbon in the Sky" (1982)
- "I Just Called To Say I Love You" (1984)
- "Love Light in Flight" (1984)
- "Part Time Lover" (1985)
- "Go Home" (1985)
- "That's What Friends Are For" (1985)
- "Overjoyed" (1986)
- "Skeletons" (1987)
- "You Will Know" (1988)
- "My Love" (1988)
- "Gotta Have You" (1991)
- "Jungle Fever" (1991)
- "These Three Words" (1991)
- "Fun Day" (1992)
- "Make Sure You're Sure" (1992)
- "For Your Love" (1995)
- "Tomorrow Robins Will Sing" (1995)
- "Treat Myself" (1996)
- "How Come, How Long" (1997)
- "True to Your Heart" (1998)
- "All About the Love Again" (2009)
- "Isn't She Lovely" (2012)
- "Faith" (2016)

== Other appearances ==
Year	Song(s)	Album	Notes
1968	"Swing Low, Sweet Chariot"	In Loving Memory	traditional
1985	"Upset Stomach"	The Last Dragon	original songs
1990	"Feeding Off the Love of the Land"	Nobody's Child: Romanian Angel Appeal	original songs
1992	"O Thou That Tellest Good Tidings to Zion"	Handel's Messiah: A Soulful Celebration	cover with Take 6
1994	"I'm the One Who Loves You"	A Tribute to Curtis Mayfield	cover
1995	"Stubborn Kind of Fellow"	Inner City Blues: The Music of Marvin Gaye	cover
1996	"Hold on to Your Dream" and "Kiss Lonely Good-Bye"	The Adventures of Pinocchio	original songs
1996	"Redemption Song"	Get on the Bus	original songs
1998	"If Ever"	Down in the Delta	original songs
2000	"Misrepresented People" and "Some Years Ago"	Bamboozled	original songs
2005	"So Amazing"	So Amazing: An All-Star Tribute to Luther Vandross	cover with Beyoncé
2016	"Faith"	Sing: Original Motion Picture Soundtrack	original song

== Guest appearances ==
Year	Song(s)	Album	Artist	Role
1962	"Someday Pretty Baby"	single	Singin' Sammy Ward	harmonica
1970	"It's a Shame"	2nd Time Around	The Spinners	writer / producer
1970	"The Distant Dreamer" / "Do I Love Her"	The Piano Player	Ramsey Lewis	writer
1972	all	Syreeta	Syreeta Wright	writer / producer / multi-instrumentalist
1973	"The Lonely One"	It's Like You Never Left	Dave Mason	harmonica
1973	"Bad Weather"	single	The Supremes	writer
1973	"To Know You Is to Love You"	To Know You Is to Love You	B.B. King	keyboards
1974	all	Stevie Wonder Presents: Syreeta	Syreeta Wright	writer / producer / multi-instrumentalist
1974	"Tell Me Something Good"	Rags to Rufus	Rufus	writer
1974	"Take a Little Trip" / "Perfect Angel"	Perfect Angel	Minnie Riperton	writer / multi-instrumentalist (album)
1975	"I Can See the Sun in Late December"	Feel Like Makin' Love	Roberta Flack	writer
1975	"Sleeping Alone"	Steppin'	The Pointer Sisters	writer
1975	"Do It While You Can" / "It's My Pleasure"	It's My Pleasure	Billy Preston	harmonica
1975	"Cause We've Ended as Lovers" / "Thelonious"	Blow by Blow	Jeff Beck	writer / keyboards
1976	"Don't Be Sad 'Cause Your Sun Is Down"	In the Pocket	James Taylor	writer / harmonica
1976	"She's a Sailor"	Airborne	The Flying Burrito Brothers	writer / piano
1977	"The Real Thing"	Sergio Mendes & The New Brasil '77	Sérgio Mendes & The New Brasil '77	writer
1977	"Spring High" / "Love Notes"	Love Notes	Ramsey Lewis	writer / keyboards
1978	"Just the Way You Are"	That's What Friends Are For	Johnny Mathis and Deniece Williams	harmonica
1978	"You"	Loving Is Living	The McCrarys	harmonica
1979	"I Can't Help It"	Off the Wall	Michael Jackson	writer
1979	"You Are My Heaven" / "Don't Make Me Wait Too Long"	Roberta Flack Featuring Donny Hathaway	Roberta Flack & Donny Hathaway	writer / keyboards
1979	"Soul Bones"	The Whole World's Dancing	Trammps	harmonica
1979	"I'll Be Thinking Of You"	I'll Be Thinking of You	Andrae Crouch	harmonica
1980	all	Let's Get Serious	Jermaine Jackson	writer / producer / multi-instrumentalist
1980	"My Love Has Passed You By"	La Toya Jackson	La Toya Jackson	harmonica
1980	"Give Me Time"	Love Lives Forever	Minnie Riperton	harmonica
1981	"Betcha' Wouldn't Hurt Me"	The Dude	Quincy Jones	synthesizer
1982	"Ebony and Ivory" and "What's That You're Doing"	Tug of War	Paul McCartney	vocals
1982	"Try Jah Love"	Third World	Third World	writer / producer
1982	"Used to Be"	Used to Be	Charlene	vocals
1982	"Samurai"	Luz	Djavan	harmonica
1983	"Stay Gold"	The Outsiders	Carmine Coppola	composer / vocals
1983	"I Guess That's Why They Call It The Blues"	Too Low for Zero	Elton John	harmonica
1983	"The Crown"	single	Gary Byrd and the GB Experience	writer / vocals
1983	"Someday"	Gap Band V: Jammin'	The Gap Band	backing vocals / harmonica
1983	"Spice Of Life"	Bodies and Souls	The Manhattan Transfer	harmonica
1983	"Love Me in a Special Way"	In a Special Way	DeBarge	harmonica
1984	"I Feel for You"	I Feel For You	Chaka Khan	harmonica
1984	"Feel It"	East To West	Feelabelia	harmonica (uncredited)
1984	"Closer to the Source"	Closer to the Source	Dizzy Gillespie	harmonica / synthesizer
1985	"We Are the World"	We Are the World	USA for Africa	vocals
1985	"There Must Be an Angel (Playing with My Heart)"	Be Yourself Tonight	Eurythmics	harmonica
1985	"If Ever"	Dreamland Express	John Denver	harmonica
1985	"I Do Love You"	The Beach Boys	The Beach Boys	multi-instrumentalist
1985	"Cold Farewell (Tsumetai Wakare)"	single	Miyuki Nakajima	harmonica
1985	"That's What Friends Are For"	Friends	Dionne Warwick, Elton John and Gladys Knight	vocals / harmonica
1985	"She's So Beautiful"	Dave Clark's "Time" (The Album)	Cliff Richard	multi-instrumentalist / arranger / producer
1986	"My Summer Vacation (Atai no Natsuyasumi)"	36.5°C	Miyuki Nakajima	synthesizer
1986	"Time Will Teach Us All"	Time	Julian Lennon	backing vocals
1987	"Just Good Friends"	Bad	Michael Jackson	vocals / synthesizer
1988	"Nightingales"	From Langley Park to Memphis	Prefab Sprout	harmonica
1988	"My Love"	Non Stop	Julio Iglesias	writer / producer / vocals
1988	"Signed, Sealed, Delivered (I'm Yours)"	C.K.	Chaka Khan	harmonica
1988	"Stephen's Kingdom"	Bird of Paradise	Djavan	harmonica
1989	"Have A Talk With God"	Body & Soul	Jon Gibson	harmonica
1989	"Hollywood"	One + One	One + One	harmonica
1990	"Everyday the Same"	Return	The Winans	backing vocals / harmonica
1990	"We Didn't Know"	I'm Your Baby Tonight	Whitney Houston	writer / producer / vocals / all instruments
1991	"Strong is Our Love"	Marva Hicks	Marva Hicks	writer
1991	"Will You Marry Me?"	Spellbound	Paula Abdul	harmonica
1992	"Too High"	Just Between Us	Norman Brown	lead vocals / harmonica
1993	"Blowin' in the Wind"	The 30th Anniversary Concert Celebration	Bob Dylan	vocals / harmonica / piano
1993	"Go On and On"	Duets	Elton John	writer / synthesizer
1994	"Where You Are"	Heart, Mind and Soul	El DeBarge	harmonica
1994	"Deuce"	Kiss My Ass: Classic Kiss Regrooved	Lenny Kravitz	harmonica
1994	"For Once in My Life"	Duets II	Frank Sinatra and Gladys Knight	harmonica
1994	"Why I Feel This Way"	Join the Band	Take 6	vocals
1995	"Dous'"	Difé	Kassav'	harmonica
1995	"Let the Good Times Roll"	Q's Jook Joint	Quincy Jones	vocals
1996	"Simply Say I Love U"	Let's Get the Mood Right	Johnny Gill	vocals
1996	"Seasons of Love"	Rent (Original Broadway Cast Recording)	Jonathan Larson	vocals / harmonica
1997	"I'm Too Close"	Still Standing	The Williams Brothers	vocals / harmonica
1998	"St. Louis Woman"	Gershwin's World	Herbie Hancock	vocals / harmonica
1998	"Peace Wanted Just To Be Free"	For The Children Of Liberia	Luciano Pavarotti	vocals
1998	"Mastablasta '98"	How Stella Got Her Groove Back: Music from the Motion Picture	with Wyclef Jean	vocals
1999	"Brand New Day"	Brand New Day	Sting	harmonica
2000	"Loves Me Like a Rock" / "A Talk with God"	Music in the Air: The 70th Anniversary All-Star Tribute	The Dixie Hummingbirds	vocals
2000	"Finally"	Friends for Schuur	Diane Schuur	writer
2001	"Something Like You"	Celebrity	NSYNC	harmonica
2001	"Everyday (I Have The Blues)"	Playing with My Friends: Bennett Sings the Blues	Tony Bennett	vocals / harmonica
2001	"Ghetto Village"	The Return of the Regulator	Warren G	vocals
2001	"Dark Diamond"	Songs from the West Coast	Elton John	harmonica / clavinet
2002	"Justice of the Heart"	John Q.	soundtrack	vocals
2002	"The Christmas Song"	Voyage to India	India Arie	vocals
2003	"Into You"	Unwrapped	Gloria Estefan	vocals / harmonica
2003	"Signed, Sealed, Delivered I'm Yours"	Guilty	Blue	vocals
2003	"Until You Come Back to Me (That's What I'm Gonna Do)"	At Last	Cyndi Lauper	harmonica
2004	"What a Wonderful World"	Stardust:The Great American Songbook Volume III	Rod Stewart	vocals
2004	"Moon River"	Ultimate Mancini	Take 6	harmonica
2005	"Why"	Hero	Kirk Franklin	vocals / harmonica
2006	"Been Through The Storm"	The Big Bang	Busta Rhymes	vocals
2006	"Feeling You"	Sing (If You Want It)	Omar	vocals
2006	"Conversations"	Tha Blue Carpet Treatment	Snoop Dogg	vocals
2006	"For Once in My Life"	Duets: An American Classic	Tony Bennett	vocals
2006	"Berimbau Consolação"	Timeless	Sérgio Mendes	harmonica
2006	"I Was Made to Love Her"	Motown Two	Michael McDonald	harmonica
2006	"Crazy For Her (Ah Men Halawtu)"	Lela	Hakim	harmonica
2006	"Canzoni Stonate"	Amore	Andrea Bocelli	harmonica
2007	"Love's In Need Of Love Today"	Darfur Now (soundtrack)	Bono	vocals
2008	"Never Give You Up"	The Way I See It	Raphael Saadiq	harmonica
2009	"For Once in My Life"	25th Anniversary Rock and Roll Hall of Fame Concerts	Stevie	multi-instrumentalist
2009	"The Tracks of My Tears"	25th Anniversary Rock and Roll Hall of Fame Concerts	with Smokey Robinson	multi-instrumentalist
2009	"The Way You Make Me Feel"	25th Anniversary Rock and Roll Hall of Fame Concerts	with John Legend	multi-instrumentalist
2009	"The Thrill is Gone"	25th Anniversary Rock and Roll Hall of Fame Concerts	with B.B. King	multi-instrumentalist
2009	"Higher Ground"/ "Roxanne"	25th Anniversary Rock and Roll Hall of Fame Concerts	with Sting	multi-instrumentalist
2009	Superstition	25th Anniversary Rock and Roll Hall of Fame Concerts	with Jeff Beck	multi-instrumentalist
2011	"Have Sweet Dreams"	Motions Of Love	Maysa Leak	harmonica
2011	"Doing It Wrong"	Take Care	Drake	harmonica
2011	"Stevie on the Radio"	Young Foolish Happy	Pixie Lott	harmonica
2011	"My Cherie Amour"/"Sir Duke"/"Wish"/"These Three Words"	The Best of Soul Train Live	Stevie	multi-instrumentalist
2012	"Only Our Hearts"	Kisses on the Bottom	Paul McCartney	harmonica
2013	"Only One"	New Orleans	PJ Morton	harmonica
2013	"Signed, Sealed, Delivered (I'm Yours)"	Under the Influence	Straight No Chaser	harmonica
2013	"Overjoyed"	Loved Me Back to Life	Celine Dion	vocals
2014	"People"	Partners	Barbra Streisand	vocals
2015	"California Roll"	Bush	Snoop Dogg	harmonica
2015	"Broke"	Everything Is 4	Jason Derulo and Keith Urban	harmonica, vocals
2015	"Uptown's First Finale"	Uptown Special	Mark Ronson	piano
2015	"Someday at Christmas"	Apple TV commercial	Andra Day	vocals
2016	"Where The Sun Goes"	Party Rock Mansion	Redfoo	harmonica
2016	"Black America Again"	Black America Again	Common	vocals / harmonica
2018	"Stop Trying to Be God"	Astroworld	Travis Scott	vocals / harmonica
2018	"What Christmas Means to Me"	A Legendary Christmas	John Legend	harmonica
2021	"Finish Line"	The Lockdown Sessions	Elton John	vocals / harmonica
2022	"Try"	Earthling	Eddie Vedder	harmonica
2023	"Sweet Sounds of Heaven"	Hackney Diamonds	The Rolling Stones and Lady Gaga	piano / synthesizer
2024	"What About the Children"	JPEG Raw	Gary Clark Jr.	vocals / clavinet / harp

== Production ==
Albums

Year	Title	Artist
1972	Syreeta	Syreeta Wright
1974	Stevie Wonder Presents: Syreeta	Syreeta
2003	Conception: An Interpretation of Stevie Wonder's Songs	various

Tracks

Year	Song	Artist	
1970	"We'll Have It Made"	The Spinners	single
1973	"Bad Weather"	The Supremes	single
2002	"The Christmas Song"	India Arie	Voyage to India bonus
