= Looking Back (Stevie Wonder album) =

1977 compilation album by Stevie Wonder

Compilation album by Stevie Wonder
- Released: November 30, 1977
- Recorded: 1962–1971
- Studios: Hitsville U.S.A., Detroit
- Genres: Soul, rhythm and blues
- Length: 115:15
- Label: Motown
- Producers: Clarence Paul, William Stevenson, Henry Cosby, Stevie Wonder, Johnny Bristol, Hal Davis, Berry Gordy, Brian Holland, Lamont Dozier, Ron Miller

Stevie Wonder chronology
Songs in the Key of Life (1976)	Looking Back (1977)	Stevie Wonder's Journey Through "The Secret Life of Plants" (1979)

Looking Back, also later known as Anthology, is a triple LP anthology by American soul musician Stevie Wonder, released in 1977 on Motown Records. Since its release in 12-inch triple LP format, it has not been reissued and is considered a limited edition. The album chronicles 40 songs from Wonder's first Motown period, which precedes the classic period of his critically acclaimed albums.

== Album overview ==
Between 1963 and the end of 1971, Wonder placed over 25 total songs on Billboard Hot 100. Twenty-four of those, including "Fingertips (Pt. 2)", "Uptight (Everything's Alright)", "I Was Made to Love Her", "For Once in My Life", "My Cherie Amour", and "Signed, Sealed, Delivered I'm Yours"; appeared on Looking Back. In his early years, Wonder was often produced by Clarence Paul and/or William Stevenson and later by Henry Cosby. In 1970, Wonder started producing himself, beginning with Signed, Sealed & Delivered. Most of his singles were written by Wonder himself in tandem with a variety of others, or by Ron Miller.

This triple-album LP contains every major Wonder hit and many other singles between 1962 and 1971. Compilations which included a certain material from the period were, again NOT released until At the Close of a Century (1999). This compilation marks the first release of Stevie Wonder's 1967 original recording of "Until You Come Back to Me (That's What I'm Gonna Do)," which was a 1973 hit for Aretha Franklin.

== Critical reception ==
In a contemporary review, Russell Gersten of The Village Voice wrote that, although it suffers from some poorly chosen material and omissions, the album is ultimately an "essential record" that "requires a bit more imagination and knowledge to appreciate than most anthologies, but the raw ingredients are there. Wonder worked in an era of excesses, and his fight to find meaning is—in its own modest way—uplifting." The newspaper's Robert Christgau shared a similar sentiment and said that Looking Back is at the same time "flawed, long overdue, and essential." He later included it in his "basic record library" of 1970s albums, published in Christgau's Record Guide: Rock Albums of the Seventies.

In a retrospective review for AllMusic, writer Rob Bowman gave Looking Back five stars and said that Wonder's songs from the 1960s were unique from most other Motown artists because he had a hand in writing them and his producers rarely collaborated with acts such as the Temptations or the Supremes. J. D. Considine, writing in The Rolling Stone Album Guide (1992), gave the album four-and-a-half out of five stars and felt that it is a significantly better compilation than Greatest Hits Vol. 2 (1971) because of how it highlights both his studio albums up to that point and several non-LP singles.

== Track listing ==
Side one
No.	Title	Writer(s)	Original release	Length
1.	"Thank You (For Loving Me All the Way)"	Clarence Paul; Eddie Holland; William Stevenson	B-side to "Castles in the Sand", 1964	2:30
2.	"Contract on Love"	Janie Bradford; Lamont Dozier; Brian Holland	single, 1962	2:02
3.	"Fingertips (Pt. 2)"	Henry Cosby; Paul	Recorded Live: The 12 Year Old Genius, 1963	2:52
4.	"Workout Stevie, Workout"	Paul; Cosby	single, 1963	2:40
5.	"Castles in the Sand"	Hal Davis; Frank Wilson; Marc Gordon; Mary O'Brien	Stevie at the Beach, 1964	2:10
6.	"Hey Harmonica Man"	Marty Cooper; Lou Josie	Stevie at the Beach	2:35
7.	"High Heel Sneakers"	Robert Higginbotham	Recorded Live: Motortown Revue in Paris, 1965	2:58

Side two
No.	Title	Writer(s)	Original release	Length
1.	"Uptight (Everything's Alright)"	Sylvia Moy; Cosby; Stevie Wonder	Up-Tight, 1966	2:53
2.	"Nothing's Too Good for My Baby"	Moy; Cosby; Stevenson	Up-Tight	2:38
3.	"Blowin' in the Wind"	Bob Dylan	Up-Tight	3:45
4.	"Ain't That Asking for Trouble"	Paul; Wonder; Moy	Up-Tight	2:47
5.	"I'd Cry"	Moy; Wonder	I Was Made to Love Her, 1967	2:22
6.	"A Place in the Sun"	Ron Miller; Bryan Wells	Down to Earth, 1966	2:52
7.	"Sylvia"	Moy; Cosby; Wonder	Down to Earth	2:33

Side three
No.	Title	Writer(s)	Original release	Length
1.	"Down to Earth"	Miller; William O'Malley; Stevenson (as Avery Vanderberg)	Down to Earth	2:48
2.	"Thank You Love"	Wonder; Cosby; Moy	Down to Earth	2:50
3.	"Hey Love"	Paul; Morris Broadnax; Wonder	Down to Earth	2:44
4.	"Travelin' Man"	Miller; Wells	single, 1967	2:54
5.	"Until You Come Back to Me (That's What I'm Gonna Do)"	Wonder; Paul; Broadnax	previously unreleased	3:06
6.	"I Was Made to Love Her"	Cosby; Lula Mae Hardaway; Wonder; Moy	I Was Made to Love Her	2:35
7.	"I'm Wondering"	Moy; Wonder; Cosby	single, 1967	2:52

Side four
No.	Title	Writer(s)	Original release	Length
1.	"Shoo-Be-Doo-Be-Doo-Da-Day"	Moy; Wonder; Cosby	For Once in My Life, 1968	2:48
2.	"You Met Your Match"	Don Hunter; Wonder; Hardaway	For Once in My Life	2:36
3.	"I'd Be a Fool Right Now"	Moy; Wonder; Cosby	For Once in My Life	2:53
4.	"Alfie"	Hal David; Burt Bacharach	Eivets Rednow, 1968	2:58
5.	"More Than a Dream"	Wonder; Cosby	Eivets Rednow	3:20
6.	"For Once in My Life"	Miller; Orlando Murden	For Once in My Life	2:50

Side five
No.	Title	Writer(s)	Original release	Length
1.	"Angie Girl"	Moy; Wonder; Cosby	My Cherie Amour, 1969	2:56
2.	"My Cherie Amour"	Cosby; Moy; Wonder	My Cherie Amour	2:54
3.	"Don't Know Why I Love You"	Paul Riser; Hunter; Wonder; Hardaway	For Once in My Life	2:43
4.	"If I Ruled the World"	Leslie Bricusse; Cyril Ornadel	previously unreleased	3:31
5.	"Yester-Me, Yester-You, Yesterday"	Miller; Wells	My Cherie Amour	2:57
6.	"Never Had a Dream Come True"	Wonder; Cosby; Moy	Signed, Sealed & Delivered, 1970	2:59
7.	"Signed, Sealed, Delivered I'm Yours"	Hardaway; Wonder; Syreeta Wright; Lee Garrett	Signed, Sealed & Delivered	2:46

Side six
No.	Title	Writer(s)	Original release	Length
1.	"Heaven Help Us All"	Miller	Signed, Sealed & Delivered	2:59
2.	"I Gotta Have a Song"	Wonder; Hunter; Hardaway; Riser	Signed, Sealed & Delivered	2:32
3.	"Never Dreamed You'd Leave in Summer"	Wright; Wonder	Where I'm Coming From, 1971	2:56
4.	"If You Really Love Me"	Wright; Wonder	Where I'm Coming From	2:53
5.	"Something Out of the Blue"	Wright; Wonder	Where I'm Coming From	2:58
6.	"Do Yourself a Favor"	Wright; Wonder	Where I'm Coming From	5:58

== Personnel ==
- Stevie Wonder – vocals, piano, harmonica, keyboards, clavinet, drums, bongos, percussion
- The Andantes – background vocals
- Syreeta Wright – vocals
- Marvin Gaye – drums
- Larry Moses – bass
- The Funk Brothers – instrumentation

=== Production ===
Producer	Side one	Side two	Side three	Side four	Side five	Side six
Henry Cosby		1, 2, 4, 5, 7	1, 2, 6, 7	1, 2, 3, 4, 5, 6	1, 2, 4, 6	
Clarence Paul	1, 4	3, 4, 6	1, 2, 3, 4, 5			
Stevie Wonder				2	3, 7	2, 3, 4, 5, 6
William Stevenson	1	1, 2				
Hal Davis	5, 6					
Berry Gordy	3, 7					
Ron Miller						1
Brian Holland, Lamont Dozier	2					
Johnny Bristol					5	

== Charts ==
Title	Information
Looking Back	US Pop Albums (1977) #34; US Top R&B Albums #15
"Castles in the Sand"	US Pop Singles #52; US Black Singles #52
"Nothing's Too Good for My Baby"	US Pop Singles #20; US Black Singles #4

== Certifications ==
Region	Certification	Certified units/sales
Canada (Music Canada)	Gold	50,000^{^}
United Kingdom (BPI)	Silver	60,000^{^}
^{^} Shipments figures based on certification alone.
