= The Definitive Collection (Stevie Wonder album) =

- US/international release cover art

Compilation album by Stevie Wonder
- Released: October 21, 2002 (UK); October 29, 2002 (NA)
- Recorded: 1962–1998; 2003
- Genres: R&B, soul, pop
- Length: 1:19:46 (UK single disc/US release); 02:25:48 (UK double album release)
- Label: Motown/Universal
- Producers: Hank Cosby, Stevie Wonder, Clarence Paul

Stevie Wonder chronology
At the Close of a Century (1999)	The Definitive Collection (2002)	A Time to Love (2005)

Alternative cover
- French release cover art

Alternative cover
- 2003 UK re-release cover art

Alternative cover
- Japanese release cover art

Professional ratings
Review scores
Source	Rating
Allmusic	5/5 stars
God Is in the TV	9/10

Stevie Wonder: The Definitive Collection is a compilation album, released in 2002, by American singer Stevie Wonder. It was released in the United Kingdom as a 38-track, two-disc compilation.

== Track listings ==
All songs written by Stevie Wonder, except where noted.

=== UK single disc/US release ===
No.	Title	From the album	Length
1.	"Fingertips (Part 2)" (Clarence Paul, Henry Cosby)	Recorded Live: The 12 Year Old Genius, 1963	3:10
2.	"Uptight (Everything's Alright)" (Sylvia Moy, Cosby, Stevie Wonder)	Up Tight, 1966	2:52
3.	"Hey Love" (Paul, Morris Broadnax, Wonder)	Down to Earth, 1966	2:44
4.	"I Was Made to Love Her" (Wonder, Cosby, Moy, Lula Mae Hardaway)	I Was Made to Love Her, 1967	2:35
5.	"For Once in My Life" (Ron Miller, Orlando Murden)	For Once in My Life, 1968	2:48
6.	"My Cherie Amour" (Cosby, Moy, Wonder)	My Cherie Amour, 1969	2:52
7.	"Signed, Sealed, Delivered I'm Yours" (Lee Garrett, Hardaway, Wonder, Syreeta Wright)	Signed, Sealed & Delivered, 1970	2:39
8.	"You Are the Sunshine of My Life" (single version)	Talking Book, 1972 - single mix, including the horn section	2:50
9.	"Superstition" (7" version)	Talking Book	4:05
10.	"Higher Ground" (single version)	Innervisions, 1973	3:11
11.	"Living for the City^"	Innervisions	7:25/3:41^
12.	"You Haven't Done Nothin'"	Fulfillingness' First Finale, 1974	3:27
13.	"Boogie On Reggae Woman" (Single version)	Fulfillingness' First Finale	4:11
14.	"I Wish"	Songs in the Key of Life, 1976	4:09
15.	"Sir Duke"	Songs in the Key of Life	3:53
16.	"Master Blaster (Jammin')" (7" version)	Hotter than July, 1980	4:51
17.	"That Girl"	Stevie Wonder's Original Musiquarium I, 1982	5:09
18.	"Do I Do" (Edited version)	Stevie Wonder's Original Musiquarium I	5:01
19.	"I Just Called to Say I Love You" (Single version)	The Woman in Red soundtrack, 1984	4:22
20.	"Overjoyed"	In Square Circle, 1985	3:43
21.	"Part-Time Lover" (7" version)	In Square Circle	3:42

^ - 7" version on the UK single disc pressing

=== UK release ===
Disc 1
No.	Title	From the album	Length
1.	"Superstition"		4:28
2.	"Sir Duke"		3:54
3.	"I Wish"		4:14
4.	"Master Blaster (Jammin')"		5:09
5.	"Isn't She Lovely" (Radio edit)	Songs in the Key of Life	3:21
6.	"I Just Called to Say I Love You" (Single version)		4:23
7.	"Ebony and Ivory" (Duet with Paul McCartney; written by McCartney)	Tug of War, 1982	3:42
8.	"As" (Single version)	Songs in the Key of Life	3:29
9.	"Never Had a Dream Come True" (Wonder, Cosby, Moy)	Signed, Sealed & Delivered	3:13
10.	"I Was Made to Love Her" (Wonder, Cosby, Moy, Hardaway)	I Was Made to Love Her, 1967	2:37
11.	"Heaven Help Us All" (Miller)	Signed, Sealed & Delivered	3:13
12.	"Overjoyed"	In Square Circle	3:44
13.	"Lately"	Hotter than July	4:07
14.	"For Your Love"	Conversation Peace, 1995	5:02
15.	"If You Really Love Me" (Wonder, Wright)	Where I'm Coming From, 1971	2:59
16.	"Higher Ground"	Innervisions	3:44
17.	"Do I Do" (Edited version)		5:05
18.	"Living for the City" (Single version)		3:41
19.	"Part-Time Lover"		4:14

Disc 2
No.	Title	From the album	Length
1.	"For Once in My Life" (Miller, Murden)		2:48
2.	"Uptight (Everything's Alright)" (Moy, Paul, Wonder)		2:53
3.	"We Can Work It Out" (The Beatles cover; written by John Lennon, McCartney)	Signed, Sealed & Delivered	3:15
4.	"Signed, Sealed, Delivered I'm Yours" (Garrett, Hardaway, Wonder, Wright)		2:38
5.	"Yester-Me, Yester-You, Yesterday" (Miller, Bryan Wells)	My Cherie Amour	3:04
6.	"I'm Wondering" (Wonder, Cosby, Moy)	Non-album single, 1967; later released on At the Close of a Century, 1999	2:54
7.	"My Cherie Amour" (Cosby, Moy, Wonder)		2:52
8.	"You Are the Sunshine of My Life"		2:58
9.	"I Don't Know Why (I Love You)" (Wonder, Paul Riser, Don Hunter, Hardaway)	For Once in My Life	2:47
10.	"A Place in the Sun" (Miller, Wells)	Down to Earth	2:49
11.	"Blowin' in the Wind" (Bob Dylan cover; written by Dylan)	Up Tight	3:04
12.	"Send One Your Love"	Stevie Wonder's Journey Through "The Secret Life of Plants", 1979	4:02
13.	"Pastime Paradise"	Songs in the Key of Life	3:28
14.	"I Ain't Gonna Stand for It"	Hotter than July	4:39
15.	"Fingertips, Pts. 1 & 2 (Live)" (Paul, Cosby)	Recorded Live: The 12 Year Old Genius	6:55
16.	"Boogie On Reggae Woman"		5:13
17.	"You Haven't Done Nothin'"		3:23
18.	"He's Misstra Know It All"	Innervisions	5:34
19.	"Happy Birthday"	Hotter than July	5:54

NOTE: In 2003, the set was re-released with a re-recorded version of "Signed, Sealed, Delivered I'm Yours" featuring Blue and Angie Stone.

=== Japan release ===
==== Standard ====
No.	Title	Length
1.	"You Are the Sunshine of My Life"	2:58
2.	"Superstition"	4:28
3.	"Sir Duke"	3:54
4.	"I Wish"	4:14
5.	"Overjoyed"	3:44
6.	"My Cherie Amour" (Cosby, Moy, Wonder)	2:52
7.	"For Once in My Life" (Miller, Murden)	2:48
8.	"Signed, Sealed, Delivered I'm Yours" (Garrett, Hardaway, Wonder, Wright)	2:38
9.	"Higher Ground"	3:44
10.	"Master Blaster (Jammin')"	5:09
11.	"Boogie On Reggae Woman"	5:13
12.	"I Was Made to Love Her" (Wonder, Cosby, Moy, Hardaway)	2:37
13.	"Uptight (Everything's Alright)" (Moy, Paul, Wonder)	2:53
14.	"Fingertips, Part 2 (Live)" (Paul, Cosby)	3:10
15.	"Hey Love" (Broadnax, Paul, Wonder)	2:42
16.	"Living for the City" (Single version)	3:41
17.	"You Haven't Done Nothin'"	3:23
18.	"That Girl"	5:09
19.	"Do I Do" (Edited version)	5:05
20.	"I Just Called to Say I Love You" (Single version)	4:23
21.	"Part-Time Lover" (7" version)	4:14

==== Deluxe edition ====
Disc 1
No.	Title	From the album	Length
1.	"You Are the Sunshine of My Life"		2:58
2.	"Isn't She Lovely" (Radio edit)		3:21
3.	"My Cherie Amour" (Cosby, Moy, Wonder)		2:52
4.	"Sir Duke"		3:54
5.	"I Wish"		4:14
6.	"If You Really Love Me" (Wonder, Wright)		2:59
7.	"As" (Single version)		3:29
8.	"Overjoyed"		3:44
9.	"Pastime Paradise"		3:28
10.	"Boogie On Reggae Woman"		5:13
11.	"Signed, Sealed, Delivered I'm Yours" (Garrett, Hardaway, Wonder, Wright)		2:38
12.	"Yester-Me, Yester-You, Yesterday" (Miller, Wells)		3:04
13.	"I Was Made to Love Her" (Wonder, Cosby, Moy, Hardaway)		2:37
14.	"A Place in the Sun" (Miller, Wells)	Down to Earth	2:49
15.	"He's Misstra Know It All"		5:34
16.	"Send One Your Love"		4:02
17.	"I Ain't Gonna Stand for It"		4:39
18.	"Living for the City" (Single version)		3:41
19.	"I Just Called to Say I Love You"		4:23
20.	"Part-Time Lover"		4:14

Disc 2
No.	Title	From the album	Length
1.	"Superstition"		4:28
2.	"Higher Ground"		3:44
3.	"Master Blaster (Jammin')"		5:09
4.	"For Once in My Life" (Miller, Murden)		2:48
5.	"Never Had a Dream Come True" (Wonder, Cosby, Moy)		3:13
6.	"We Can Work It Out" (The Beatles cover; written by Lennon–McCartney)		3:15
7.	"Uptight (Everything's Alright)" (Moy, Paul, Wonder)		2:53
8.	"Blowin' in the Wind" (Bob Dylan cover; written by Dylan)		3:04
9.	"You Haven't Done Nothin'"		3:23
10.	"Ebony and Ivory" (Duet with Paul McCartney; written by McCartney)		3:42
11.	"For Your Love"		5:02
12.	"Fingertips, Pts. 1 & 2 (Live)" (Paul, Cosby)		6:55
13.	"I'm Wondering" (Wonder, Cosby, Moy)		2:54
14.	"I Don't Know Why (I Love You)" (Wonder, Riser, Hunter, Hardaway)		2:47
15.	"Heaven Help Us All" (Miller)		3:13
16.	"Lately"		4:07
17.	"Do I Do" (Edited version)		5:05
18.	"Happy Birthday"	Hotter than July	5:54
19.	"To Feel the Fire"	Previously unreleased, 2002/2003; originally from 1999	3:47

== Charts ==
=== Weekly charts ===
Chart (2002)	Peak position
Danish Albums (Hitlisten)	6
UK R&B Albums (Official Charts)	4
US Billboard 200	35
US Top R&B/Hip-Hop Albums (Billboard)	28

Chart (2003)	Peak position
Australian Albums (ARIA)	66
Dutch Albums (Album Top 100)	71
Italian Albums (FIMI)	8
Japanese Albums (Oricon)	9
Norwegian Albums (VG-lista)	3
Swedish Albums (Sverigetopplistan)	2

Chart (2004)	Peak position
Finnish Albums (Suomen virallinen lista)	26

Chart (2005)	Peak position
US Top Catalog Albums (Billboard)	1

Chart (2008)	Peak position
UK Albums (Official Charts)	11

Chart (2013)	Peak position
French Albums (SNEP)	152

Chart (2020)	Peak position
Swiss Albums (Schweizer Hitparade)	31

=== Year-end charts ===
Chart (2002)	Position
UK Albums (OCC)	80

Chart (2003)	Position
Swedish Albums (Sverigetopplistan)	39

Chart (2008)	Position
UK Albums (OCC)	176

Chart (2009)	Position
UK Albums (OCC)	171

Chart (2020)	Position
UK Albums (OCC)	76

Chart (2021)	Position
UK Albums (OCC)	88

Chart (2022)	Position
UK Albums (OCC)	87

Chart (2023)	Position
UK Albums (OCC)	100

Chart (2025)	Position
UK Albums (OCC)	92

== Certifications ==
Region	Certification	Certified units/sales
Japan (RIAJ)	Platinum	250,000^{^}
Sweden (GLF)	Gold	30,000^{^}
United Kingdom (BPI)	6× Platinum	1,800,000^{‡}
United States (RIAA)	4× Platinum	4,000,000^{‡}
Summaries
Europe (IFPI)	Platinum	1,000,000^{*}
^{*} Sales figures based on certification alone.^{^} Shipments figures based on certification alone.^{‡} Sales+streaming figures based on certification alone.
