= I Was Made to Love Her =

I Was Made to Love Her may refer to:

- "I Was Made to Love Her" (song), a 1967 song by Stevie Wonder
- I Was Made to Love Her (album), a 1967 album by Stevie Wonder
