= A New Place in the Sun =

Studio album by Glen Campbell
- Released: May 1968
- Recorded: 1968
- Studio: Capitol (Hollywood)
- Label: Capitol
- Producer: Al De Lory

Glen Campbell chronology
Hey Little One (1967)	A New Place in the Sun (1968)	Bobbie Gentry and Glen Campbell (1968)

Professional ratings
Review scores
Source	Rating
Allmusic	2/5 stars

A New Place in the Sun is the ninth studio album by American singer-guitarist Glen Campbell, released in 1968 by Capitol Records.

== Track listing ==
Side 1

1. "Freeborn Man" (Keith Allison, Mark Lindsay) – 2:40
2. "The Last Letter" (Rex Griffin) – 2:55
3. "She Called Me Baby" (Harlan Howard) – 3:00
4. "Visions of Sugarplums" (Glen Campbell, Jerry Fuller) – 1:53
5. "I Have No One to Love Me Anymore" (Glen Campbell) - 2:43
6. "The Legend of Bonnie and Clyde" (Merle Haggard, Bonnie Owens) – 2:05

Side 2

1. "A Place in the Sun" (Bryan Wells, Ron Miller) – 2:42
2. "Have I Stayed Away Too Long?" (Frank Loesser) – 2:17
3. "Within My Memory" (Mac Davis, Freddy Weller) – 2:11
4. "The Twelfth of Never" (Jerry Livingston, Paul Francis Webster) – 2:25
5. "Sunny Day Girl" (Jeff Hildt, Roger Williams) – 2:11

== Personnel ==
Music

- Glen Campbell – vocals, acoustic guitar
- John Hartford – banjo
- Al Casey – acoustic guitar
- Joe Osborn – bass guitar
- Bob Felts – drums
- Jim Gordon – drums

Production

- Producer - Al De Lory
- Arranged and conducted by Al De Lory

== Charts ==
Album – Billboard (United States)

Chart	Entry date	Peak position	No. of weeks
Billboard Country Albums	05/18/1968	1(6)	42
Billboard 200	6/22/1968	24	33
