= You've Been in Love Too Long =

Single by Martha and the Vandellas
- B-side: "Love (Makes Me Do Foolish Things)"
- Released: July 26, 1965
- Recorded: June 13, 1965
- Studio: Hitsville USA, Detroit
- Genre: Soul
- Length: 2:57
- Label: Gordy G 7045
- Songwriter(s): William "Mickey" Stevenson, Ivy Jo Hunter, Clarence Paul

Martha and the Vandellas singles chronology
"Nowhere to Run" (1965)	"You've Been in Love Too Long" / "Love (Makes Me Do Foolish Things)" (1965)	"My Baby Loves Me" (1966)

"You've Been in Love Too Long" is a song produced and written by William "Mickey" Stevenson, Ivy Jo Hunter and Clarence Paul. It was released as a dance single when recorded by the Motown girl group Martha and the Vandellas.

== Background ==
The song was the trio's fourth straight Top 40 hit in two years, and focused on a pro-feminist theme under a gritty R&B background with the narrator (lead singer Martha Reeves) explaining to the woman in question that after years of holding on to an unfaithful and abusive lover that she should let him go saying "you're a fool for your baby". Many radio jocks preferred the "B" side, "Love (Makes Me Do Foolish Things)" in which caused split airplay and lower chart positioning.

Cash Box described it as a "rollicking, rhythmic pop-r&b item about a twosome who have been together a wee bit too long."

== Chart performance ==
In the US, "You've Been in Love Too Long" went to #25 on the Top Selling Rhythm & Blues Singles chart, and #36 on the Hot 100.
