= Hey Love (Stevie Wonder song) =

Single by Stevie Wonder

from the album Down to Earth
- A-side: "Travelin' Man"
- Released: December 1966
- Recorded: 1966
- Genre: Soul
- Length: 2:41
- Label: Tamla
- Songwriters: Clarence Paul, Morris Broadnax, Stevie Wonder
- Producer: Clarence Paul

Stevie Wonder singles chronology
"Travlin' Man" (1966)	"Hey Love" (1966)	"I Was Made To Love Her" (1967)

"Hey Love" is a 1966 song by Stevie Wonder, from his album Down to Earth. It was released as a B-side to "Travelin' Man," but it also reached the charts in its own right, peaking at number 90 on the Billboard Hot 100 and number nine on the R&B Singles chart in the spring of 1967. It has been covered by other artists, including Bettye LaVette and R. Kelly.

== Composition and recording ==
"Hey Love" is the closing track on Stevie Wonder's 1966 album Down to Earth. Co-written with Morris Broadnax and Clarence Paul, it is the best-known of the four songs on the album for which Wonder received a writing credit.

Ed Hogan of AllMusic said the song's "dominant, looping rhythm echoes the tick-tock of a clock, which gives the down-tempo track a melancholy late-night vibe, emphasizing the feeling that the singer is giving his all in a one last chance to get the direct attention of the object of his affectations."

In The Sound of Stevie Wonder: His Words and Music, James E. Perone writes, "What is notable is Wonder's developing melodic sense over what is a fairly simple harmonic scheme that involves just the tonic, subdominant, and dominant chords... 'Hey Love' presents a hint of what was to come in his compositions and performances in the 1970s."

"Hey Love" has been included on several Stevie Wonder greatest hits compilations, including Greatest Hits (1968), Looking Back (1977), Love Songs: 20 Classic Hits (1985), At the Close of a Century (1999), and The Definitive Collection (2002).

== Chart performance ==
Charts	Peak position
U.S. Billboard Hot 100	90
U.S. Billboard R&B Singles	9

== Cover versions and samples ==
- Bettye LaVette recorded a version of "Hey Love" that was released as a B-side to "With a Little Help from My Friends" in April 1969 on the Karen label.
- R. Kelly and Public Announcement covered the song as "Hey Love (Can I Have a Word)" on their 1992 album Born into the 90's. The song features R. Kelly singing lyrics from the original and Mr. Lee rapping. It reached number one on Billboard's Bubbling Under Hot 100 chart and number 15 on the R&B chart.
- De La Soul sampled "Hey Love" for their song "Talkin' Bout Hey Love" from their 1991 album De La Soul Is Dead. As part of his #ThrowbackThursday Series in 2014, Raekwon rapped over samples of "Hey Love."
