= I Should Be Proud =

Single by Martha Reeves and the Vandellas

from the album Natural Resources
- A-side: "I Should Be Proud"
- B-side: "Love, Guess Who"
- Released: February 1970
- Genre: Soul
- Label: Gordy
- Songwriter(s): Henry Cosby; Pam Sawyer; Joe Hinton

Martha Reeves and the Vandellas singles chronology
"Taking My Love (And Leaving Me)" (1969)	"I Should Be Proud" (1970)	"I Gotta Let You Go" (1970)

"I Should Be Proud" is a 1970 protest song written by Henry Cosby, Pam Sawyer and Joe Hinton and recorded by Motown girl group Martha and the Vandellas (credited as Martha Reeves & the Vandellas).

== Background ==
The song was noted for being the first released Motown protest song (released in February of the year), just months before the releases of Edwin Starr's "War" and The Temptations' "Ball of Confusion".

The song had the narrator talk of how she was devastated on hearing the news that her loved one, who had been fighting in the Vietnam War, had been shot and killed in action. Instead of being proud that her loved one had "fought for her", as people around her were claiming, all she wanted was him and not his honors for fighting the war, exclaiming that the man, disguised as "Private Johnny C. Miller", had been "fightin' for the evils of society". On the MSNBC program, Headliners And Legends: Martha & The Vandellas, Reeves commented that this song was pulled off many radio stations' playlists due to its controversial "anti-war" message during the height of the Vietnam War. Lead singer Martha Reeves took the song personally, recounting that one of her brothers had died in a Vietnam War-related incident. It was the first release off the Vandellas' Natural Resources Motown LP.

== Personnel ==
- Lead vocals by Martha Reeves
- Background vocals by Sandra Tilley, Lois Reeves, and The Andantes: Marlene Barrow, Jackie Hicks and Louvain Demps
- Instrumentation by The Funk Brothers

== Chart performance ==
Though not a big hit (peaking at #45 R&B), the song broke ground for protest songs, released on the Motown labels.

== See also ==
- List of anti-war songs
