= For Once in My Life (Stevie Wonder album) =

1968 studio album by Stevie Wonder

Studio album by Stevie Wonder
- Released: December 6, 1968
- Recorded: Mid-1967; December 1967 – February 1968; April – August 1968
- Studio: Hitsville U.S.A., Detroit, Michigan
- Genre: Soul; jazz; pop
- Length: 35:15
- Label: Tamla
- Producer: Henry Cosby; Don Hunter; Stevie Wonder

Stevie Wonder chronology
| Eivets Rednow (1968) | For Once in My Life (1968) | My Cherie Amour (1969) |

Singles from For Once in My Life
- 1. "Shoo-Be-Doo-Be-Doo-Da-Day" Released: April 30, 1968; 2. "You Met Your Match" Released: June 25, 1968; 3. "For Once in My Life" Released: October 15, 1968; 4. "I Don't Know Why" Released: January 28, 1969

Professional ratings
Review scores
| Source | Rating |
|---|---|
| AllMusic | 3/5 stars |
| Rolling Stone | 3/5 stars |

For Once in My Life is the tenth studio album by American singer-songwriter Stevie Wonder on Motown Records, released in November 1968. Then 18 years old, Wonder had established himself as one of Motown's consistent hit-makers. This album continued Wonder's growth as a vocalist and songwriter, and is the first album where he shares credit as producer. It featured four songs that hit the Hot 100 charts: "For Once in My Life" (No. 2), "Shoo-Be-Doo-Be-Doo-Da-Day" (No. 9) and the modest hits "I Don't Know Why" (No. 39) and "You Met Your Match" (No. 35). It also marked the debut of the Hohner Clavinet on a Stevie Wonder album, which would become a mainstay on albums to come.

== Track listing ==
Side one

1. "For Once In My Life" (Ron Miller, Orlando Murden) 2:48
2. "Shoo-Be-Doo-Be-Doo-Da-Day" (Henry Cosby, Sylvia Moy, Stevie Wonder) 2:45
3. "You Met Your Match" (Lula Mae Hardaway, Don Hunter, Wonder) 2:37
4. "I Wanna Make Her Love Me" (Henry Cosby, Hardaway, Moy, Wonder) 2:52
5. "I'm More Than Happy (I'm Satisfied)" (Henry Cosby, Cameron Grant, Moy, Wonder) 2:56
6. "I Don't Know Why" (Hardaway, Hunter, Paul Riser, Stevie Wonder) 2:46

Side two

1. "Sunny" (Bobby Hebb) 4:00
2. "I'd Be a Fool Right Now" (Cosby, Moy, Wonder) 2:54
3. "Ain't No Lovin'" (Hardaway, Hunter, Riser, Wonder) 2:36
4. "God Bless the Child" (Arthur Herzog Jr., Billie Holiday) 3:27
5. "Do I Love Her" (Wonder, Moy) 2:58
6. "The House on the Hill" (Lawrence Brown, Berry Gordy, Allen Story) 2:36

== Personnel ==
- Stevie Wonder – vocals, harmonica, piano, organ, clavinet, drums, percussion
- The Originals – backing vocals
- The Andantes – backing vocals
- Earl Van Dyke – piano on "For Once in My Life"
- James Jamerson – bass
- Uriel Jones – drums
- Robert White – guitar
- The Funk Brothers – all other instruments

== In other media ==
"I'd Be a Fool Right Now" would be remixed in 1977 for Wonder's Looking Back Anthology.
