= You Met Your Match =

Single by Stevie Wonder

from the album For Once in My Life
- B-side: "My Girl"
- Released: July 1968
- Recorded: 1968
- Genre: R&B; soul
- Length: 2:42
- Label: Tamla
- Songwriters: Stevie Wonder; Lula Mae Hardaway; Don Hunter
- Producers: Stevie Wonder, Don Hunter

Stevie Wonder singles chronology
"Shoo-Be-Doo-Be-Doo-Da-Day" (1968)	"You Met Your Match" (1968)	"For Once in My Life" (1968)

"You Met Your Match" is a song written by Stevie Wonder, Lula Mae Hardaway, and Don Hunter that was released by Wonder on his 1968 album For Once in My Life. It was the first song Wonder produced in the studio. "You Met Your Match" was released as a single where it reached No. 35 on the Billboard Hot 100 and No. 2 on the Billboard R&B chart.

== Background ==
Cash Box said that it has a "pounding rhythm and a vocal performance that scours the emotions," calling the single an "exciting drive side." Billboard called it a "pulsating rocker" and a "blockbuster." Wonder biographer Steve Lodder described the song as being "based around blues changes" but said that it "lacks an 'earworm' hook of a melodic line." "You Met Your Match" was one of the first songs to use a clavinet in a popular music recording.

== Chart performance ==
Chart (1968)	Peak position
US Billboard Hot 100	35
US Billboard Hot Rhythm & Blues Singles	2
