= I Wish (Stevie Wonder song) =

1976 single by Stevie Wonder

Single by Stevie Wonder

from the album Songs in the Key of Life
- B-side: "You and I"
- Released: November 1976
- Genre: Funk; soul; pop
- Length: 3:55 (single version); 4:13 (album version)
- Label: Tamla
- Songwriter: Stevie Wonder
- Producer: Stevie Wonder

Stevie Wonder singles chronology
"Boogie On Reggae Woman" (1974)	"I Wish" (1976)	"Sir Duke" (1977)

Audio video
- "I Wish" on YouTube

"I Wish" is a song by American singer Stevie Wonder. It was released in late 1976 as the lead single from his eighteenth album, Songs in the Key of Life (1976). Written and produced by Wonder, the song focuses on his childhood from the 1950s into the early 1960s about how he wished he could go back and relive it. The single hit number one on the Billboard Hot 100 and soul singles chart. At the 19th Grammy Awards, Wonder won the Best R&B Vocal Performance, Male for this song.

== Composition ==
Wonder recollected how the music for "I Wish" came to him:

The day I wrote it was a Saturday, the day of a Motown picnic in the summer of '76. God, I remember that because I was having this really bad toothache. It was ridiculous... I had such a good time at the picnic that I went to Crystal Recording Studio right afterward and the vibe came right to my mind – running at the picnic, the contests, we all participated. It was a lot of fun ... and from that came the 'I Wish' vibe."

The lyrics came with more difficulty. The lyrics that wound up in the song deal with childhood and teenage experiences, but originally, Wonder wanted to address broader topics. Wonder said he originally tried to incorporate "a lot of cosmic type stuff, spiritual stuff. But I couldn't do that 'cause the music was too much fun — the words didn't have the fun of the track," and that he "couldn't come up with anything stronger than the chorus, 'I wish those days [claps] would [claps] come back once more.' Thank goodness we didn't change that."

For the television series Classic Albums, Wonder recreated a small section from the song to demonstrate how he composed and arranged it. He played the keyboards and drums himself, and used most of the musicians that recorded the original.

== Reception ==
Cash Box said that the song was chosen as the lead single from Songs in the Key of Life after "radio stations spent weeks determining which... cut the public wanted most" and "'I Wish' came out on top in terms of popularity and editability." Record World said that "this popular and much requested track should be a major hit." Tony Parsons of NME said, "Stevie Wonder fully deserves to be up there at the top of the heap. Sly keyboard lines, clean tight funky rhythm section, Stax yellow-label horns, slurred stoned vocals and much more."

== Charts ==
=== Weekly charts ===
Chart (1976–1977)	Peak position
Australia (Kent Music Report)	51
Belgium (Ultratop 50 Flanders)	10
Belgium (Ultratop 50 Wallonia)	21
Canada Top Singles (RPM)	1
Finland (Suomen virallinen lista)	29
Germany (GfK)	30
Ireland (IRMA)	5
Netherlands (Single Top 100)	4
New Zealand (Recorded Music NZ)	19
UK Singles (Official Charts)	5
US Billboard Hot 100	1
US Hot R&B/Hip-Hop Songs (Billboard)	1
US Cash Box Top 100	1

=== Year-end charts ===
Chart (1977)	Rank
Canada (RPM)	25
US Billboard Hot 100	51
US Cash Box Top 100	51

== Certifications ==
Region	Certification	Certified units/sales
New Zealand (RMNZ)	Gold	15,000^{‡}
United Kingdom (BPI)	Silver	200,000^{‡}
^{‡} Sales+streaming figures based on certification alone.

== See also ==
- Stevie Wonder discography
