= I'm Wondering =

Single by Stevie Wonder
- B-side: "Every Time I See You I Go Wild"
- Released: September 14, 1967
- Recorded: 1967
- Genre: R&B, soul
- Length: 2:53
- Label: Tamla
- Songwriter(s): Stevie Wonder, Henry Cosby, Sylvia Moy
- Producer(s): Henry Cosby

Stevie Wonder singles chronology
"I Was Made to Love Her" (1967)	"I'm Wondering" (1967)	"Shoo-Be-Doo-Be-Doo-Da-Day" (1968)

"I'm Wondering" is a single released by American singer-songwriter Stevie Wonder as a non-album single in 1967. The single was released after his album, I Was Made to Love Her, had made its debut.

== Background ==
Billboard described the single as "driving, pulsating material with a wailing performance that moves and grooves all the way." Cash Box said that it's a "tremendous mid-speed blues rock side with "overwhelming vocals tied up with the powerful push of Detroit orking."

== Personnel ==
- Lead vocals, harmony vocals, harmonica and possible keyboards by Stevie Wonder
- Backing vocals by The Andantes
- Other instrumentation by The Funk Brothers

== Charts ==
"I'm Wondering" peaked at No. 12 on the Billboard Hot 100. It was a hit in the United Kingdom as well, where it made #22 on the Pop Charts.

Chart (1967)	Peak position
US Billboard Hot 100	12
US Hot Rhythm & Blues Singles	4
UK Singles Chart	22
