= Henry Cosby =

American songwriter (1928–2002)

- Cosby, c. 1960s

Background information
- Also known as: Hank Crosby
- Born: Henry R. Cosby; May 12, 1928; Detroit, Michigan, U.S.
- Died: January 22, 2002 (aged 73) Royal Oak, Michigan, U.S.
- Genres: R&B; soul
- Occupations: Saxophonist; songwriter; arranger; record producer
- Instruments: Tenor saxophone
- Years active: 1950s – 1970s
- Label: Motown

Henry R. Cosby (May 12, 1928 – January 22, 2002) was an American songwriter, arranger, record producer and musician who worked for Motown Records from its formative years. Along with Sylvia Moy, Cosby was a key collaborator with Stevie Wonder from 1963 to 1970. Cosby co-wrote and/or co-produced three No. 1 US hits: Stevie Wonder's "Fingertips" (1963), The Supremes' "Love Child" (1968), and The Miracles' "The Tears of a Clown" (1968).

== Life and career ==
Cosby was born in Detroit in 1928. He served in the U.S. Army during the Korean War, where he played alongside jazz saxophonist Cannonball Adderley in the military band. Upon his return to Detroit, he joined pianist Joe Hunter's jazz band. He played tenor saxophone in jazz clubs, as well as on records for different labels around the city.

When Berry Gordy launched Motown Records in 1959 he recruited the Joe Hunter Band with Cosby, Benny Benjamin, James Jamerson, Larry Veeder, and Mike Terry, forming the basis of the ever-growing group of studio musicians contracted to the company. These studio musicians became known as the Funk Brothers, and as a member of their early line-up Cosby performed on hundreds of Motown recordings in the 1960s, including Martha Reeves & the Vandellas US No. 2 hit "Dancing in the Street" (1964). As was Motown's policy at the time, none of the studio musicians were credited by name. Cosby also played on John Lee Hooker's 1962 single "Boom Boom", on Vee-Jay Records.

In addition to his saxophone playing, Cosby showed Gordy his talents as an arranger, producer, and songwriter, and became a key collaborator with the young Stevie Wonder. Through the 1960s Cosby worked with many Motown artists, including production work for The Supremes, The Temptations, Jr. Walker, Edwin Starr, Brenda Holloway, and others. He is best known for co-writing and/or co-producing many of Stevie Wonder's early hits. These include Wonder's first major hit "Fingertips", "My Cherie Amour", "I Was Made to Love Her", "Uptight (Everything's Alright)" and "For Once in My Life". Cosby received a writing credit for the 1967 US No. 4 hit "Little Ole Man (Uptight, Everything's Alright)" by Bill Cosby (not related), a revamped version of "Uptight (Everything's Alright)". Cosby co-wrote and co-produced "The Tears of a Clown" (1968), a US No. 1 hit for Smokey Robinson & the Miracles.

After leaving Motown when the company moved to Los Angeles in the early 1970s, Cosby worked for a time as a producer with Fantasy Records, including production work for Rance Allen, a gospel-influenced artist from Detroit. His later productions include albums for Martha Reeves, and Blood, Sweat and Tears. In 1977 Cosby wrote and produced the song "Be My Fortune Teller" by 94 East, one of the first recordings by Prince, and Colonel Abrams.

== Death ==
Cosby died at age 73 on January 22, 2002, at the William Beaumont Hospital in Royal Oak, Michigan, after complications from a cardiac bypass surgery. His name is written on an honorary South Tower Construction beam of the hospital.

== Honors ==
In 2006, Cosby was posthumously inducted into the Songwriters Hall of Fame, alongside Sylvia Moy.

== Selected discography ==
=== Singles ===
Year	Title	Artist	Chart	Writers	Producers
1963	"Fingertips"	Stevie Wonder	US No. 1	Cosby, Clarence Paul	Berry Gordy Jr.
1965	"Uptight (Everything's Alright)"	Stevie Wonder	US No. 3, UK No. 14	Cosby, Sylvia Moy, Wonder	Cosby, Mickey Stevenson
1966	"Nothing's Too Good for My Baby"	Stevie Wonder	US No. 20	Cosby, Moy, Stevenson	Cosby, Stevenson
1966	"A Place in the Sun"	Stevie Wonder	US No. 9, UK No. 20	Ron Miller, Bryan Wells	Cosby
1966	"It Takes Two"	Marvin Gaye & Kim Weston	US No. 14, UK No. 16	Stevenson, Moy	Cosby, Stevenson
1967	"I Was Made to Love Her"	Stevie Wonder	US No. 2, UK No. 5	Cosby, Moy, Wonder, Hardaway	Cosby
1967	"I'm Wondering"	Stevie Wonder	US No. 12, UK No. 22	Cosby, Moy, Wonder	Cosby
1968	"Shoo-Be-Doo-Be-Doo-Da-Day"	Stevie Wonder	US No. 9, UK No. 46	Cosby, Moy, Wonder	Cosby
1968	"Love Child"	Diana Ross & the Supremes	US No. 1, UK No. 15, CAN No. 1	The Clan	The Clan & Henry Cosby
1968	"For Once in My Life"	Stevie Wonder	US No. 2, UK No. 3	Ron Miller, Orlando Murden	Cosby
1969	"My Cherie Amour"	Stevie Wonder	US No. 4, UK No. 4	Cosby, Moy, Wonder	Cosby
1969	"No Matter What Sign You Are"	Diana Ross & the Supremes	US No. 31, UK No. 37	Cosby, Berry Gordy Jr.	Cosby, Berry Gordy Jr.
1970	"The Tears of a Clown"	Smokey Robinson & The Miracles	US No. 1, UK No. 1	Cosby, Wonder, Robinson	Cosby, Robinson
1970	"Never Had a Dream Come True"	Stevie Wonder	US No. 67, UK No. 6	Cosby, Moy, Wonder	Cosby
1970	"I Should Be Proud"	Martha & the Vandellas	US No. 80	Cosby, Pam Sawyer, Joe Hinton	Cosby
1971	"C'Est La Même Chanson"	Claude François	FR No. 7	Holland-Dozier-Holland	Cosby
1973	"With a Child's Heart"	Michael Jackson	US No. 50	Cosby, Moy, Vicki Basemore	Freddie Perren, Fonce Mizell

=== Albums ===
Year	Title	Artist	Chart	Producers
1962	The Jazz Soul of Little Stevie	Stevie Wonder	-	Clarence Paul, Hank Cosby
1962	Tribute to Uncle Ray	Stevie Wonder	-	Clarence Paul, Hank Cosby
1966	Up-Tight	Stevie Wonder	US No. 33, UK No. 14	Paul, Cosby, Stevenson, Brian Holland, Lamont Dozier
1966	Down to Earth	Stevie Wonder	US No. 92	Clarence Paul, Hank Cosby
1967	I Was Made to Love Her	Stevie Wonder	US No. 45	Clarence Paul, Hank Cosby
1974	Mirror Image	Blood, Sweat & Tears	US No. 149	Henry Cosby
1978	We Meet Again	Martha Reeves	-	Henry Cosby
1978	Straight From The Heart	Rance Allen	-	Henry Cosby
1979	Come Away With Me	The Originals	-	Henry Cosby
1980	Gotta Keep Moving	Martha Reeves	-	Henry Cosby, Lamont Dozier
