= For Once in My Life =

1968 single by Stevie Wonder

"For Once in My Life" is a song written by Ron Miller and Orlando Murden for Motown Records' Stein & Van Stock publishing company, and first recorded in 1965.

It was written and first recorded as a slow ballad, in 1965 by Connie Haines, but the first version to be released was by Jean DuShon in 1966. Other early versions of the ballad were issued by Nancy Wilson, the Four Tops, the Temptations, Diana Ross & the Supremes, Frank Sinatra and Tony Bennett, whose recording was the first to reach the pop charts.

The most familiar and successful version of "For Once in My Life" is an uptempo arrangement by Stevie Wonder, recorded in 1967. Wonder's version, issued on Motown's Tamla label, was a top-three hit in the United States and the United Kingdom in late 1968 and early 1969.

== Early recordings ==
Miller and Murden wrote the song in 1965 as a slow ballad, and passed it around various singers so that it could be tried out and refined.

=== Jean DuShon ===
Jean DuShon was one of the singers who was originally tapped by Ron Miller to demo the song as he was fine-tuning the composition. Miller was impressed by DuShon's rendition, and her version, produced by Esmond Edwards, was issued as a single on Chess Records' Cadet label in October 1966. It was chosen "Pick Hit of the Week" by Detroit's WXYZ radio. Although the record label gave the sole songwriting credit to Murden, Motown CEO Berry Gordy discovered that Miller – who was contracted to Motown – had co-written the song, and reportedly asked Chess not to promote the single. DuShon dropped "For Once in My Life" from her nightclub act and later said: "It was a very big disappointment in my life. I stopped singing it ‘cause I didn’t have the song. I didn’t have anything. It wasn’t mine anymore."

=== Connie Haines ===
Connie Haines was a contracted singer signed to Motown in 1965 and as indicated by the Motown session logs and tape information, she recorded the first version of the song at the label in July 1965. Her original version remained unreleased for 50 years until it was released on the MP3 download album Motown Unreleased 1965 in 2015.

=== Barbara McNair ===
"For Once in My Life"

Song by Barbara McNair

from the album Here I Am
- Released: 1966
- Recorded: October 1965
- Length: 2:56
- Songwriters: Ron Miller; Orlando Murden
- Producer: Frank Wilson

Barbara McNair's version of the song was recorded as early as October 1965, and backed up by a symphony orchestra and produced by Frank Wilson. Some sources suggest that the song was originally written for McNair; others that Gordy, hearing the song, insisted that she record it. However, her version was not released until it appeared on her November 1966 album, Here I Am. It was also released as the B-side of her 1968 single, "Where Would I Be Without You". In later years, McNair re-recorded the song with a faster tempo.

=== Other Motown recordings ===
Singer Jack Soo claimed that he was the first male artist to record a version of the song, after he joined Motown in 1965 as one of their first non-African American artists. The record was never released and was permanently shelved in the Motown archives.

The Four Tops recorded the song on their album 4 Tops on Broadway, released in March 1967 and, like McNair's recording, produced as a slow ballad by Frank Wilson.

The Temptations also recorded the song for their pop standards based album The Temptations in a Mellow Mood, released in July 1967. Baritone singer Paul Williams sings the lead vocal on the song, and it subsequently became his showcase number in the Temptations' live shows. Williams' most famous performance of the number was during the Supremes and Temptations' TCB television special in 1968, a performance cited as the apex of Williams' career. The song also made its way into the 1998 made-for-television miniseries on NBC, The Temptations. After celebrating the Temptations' (and Motown's) first Grammy Award win for "Cloud Nine", the actor who portrays Paul Williams (Christian Payton) sings the slow ballad version.

Diana Ross & the Supremes recorded a mid-tempo bossa nova inspired version in early 1969 that wasn't discovered until the 2010s and not released until 2019.

The song would become the most covered song in the Motown catalog by fellow Motown artists: Billy Eckstine (1966), Martha & the Vandellas (1967), Soupy Sales (1968), Jonah Jones (1968), Smokey Robinson & the Miracles (1969), Blinky (1969), Kiki Dee (1969), Sammy Davis Jr. (1969), Joe Harnell (1969), the Ding Dongs (1970), Gladys Knight & the Pips (1973)

=== Tony Bennett ===
Also in 1967, Tony Bennett's recording of the song peaked at number 91 on the Billboard Pop Singles chart (number 8 on the Easy Listening survey) and was the title track of his album For Once in My Life. "For Once in My Life" remained in Bennett's concert repertoire into the 2000s. In 2006, Bennett teamed up with Stevie Wonder to record a ballad tempo version for his Duets: An American Classic album, for which Bennett and Wonder received a Grammy Award for Best Pop Collaboration with Vocals. Bennett also performed it on the grand finale of the sixth season of American Idol and in the Grammy Award-sponsored tribute Stevie Wonder: Songs in the Key of Life – An All-Star Salute, which aired February 16, 2015, on CBS.

=== Frank Sinatra version ===
Frank Sinatra's version was released in March 1969, composed by Ron Miller and Orlando Murden, and it was part of his album, My Way.

== Stevie Wonder version ==
"For Once in My Life"

Single by Stevie Wonder

from the album For Once in My Life
- B-side: "Angie Girl"
- Released: October 15, 1968
- Recorded: Summer 1967
- Studio: Hitsville USA Studio A (Detroit)
- Genre: Soul
- Length: 2:52
- Label: Tamla T 54174
- Songwriters: Ron Miller; Orlando Murden
- Producer: Henry Cosby

Stevie Wonder singles chronology
"You Met Your Match" (1968)	"For Once in My Life" (1968)	"I Don't Know Why" (1969)

Audio video
- "For Once in My Life" on YouTube

Stevie Wonder's version was recorded at about the same time as the Temptations' in the summer of 1967. However, Berry Gordy did not like Wonder's version, an upbeat rendition produced by Henry Cosby. Gordy vetoed the single's release, and the recording was shelved. Billie Jean Brown, the head of the Motown Quality Control department, finally coerced Gordy into allowing Wonder's version to be released in October 1968.

Contrary to Gordy's instincts, "For Once in My Life" was a highly successful record, peaking at number-two on both the Billboard Pop Singles and Billboard R&B Singles charts (it was held off from the number-one spot on each chart by another Motown single Gordy had originally vetoed, Marvin Gaye's "I Heard It Through the Grapevine"). "For Once in My Life", issued by Tamla with "Angie Girl" as its B-side, was later included as the title track on Wonder's For Once in My Life album.

Wonder's version of the track is often singled out by bassists as one of the greatest examples of James Jamerson's playing style, with no two bars of music played alike during the whole song; a completely improvisational line that is both melodic and complementary to Wonder's vocal. Background vocals are by the Originals (Freddie Gorman, Walter Gaines, Hank Dixon, C.P. Spencer) and the Andantes (Jackie Hicks, Marlene Barrow, Louvain Demps), with instrumentation by the Funk Brothers.

=== Personnel ===
- Stevie Wonder – vocals, harmonica
- James Jamerson – bass
- Uriel Jones – drums
- Earl Van Dyke - piano
- Background vocals are by the Originals (Freddie Gorman, Walter Gaines, Hank Dixon, C.P. Spencer) and the Andantes (Jackie Hicks, Marlene Barrow, Louvain Demps)
- Additional instrumentation by the Funk Brothers

=== Charts ===
==== Weekly charts ====
Chart (1968–69)	Peak position
Australia (Go-Set)	20
Canada RPM Top Singles	5
Ireland	11
UK	3
US Billboard Hot 100	2
US Billboard R&B	2
US Cash Box Top 100	1

==== Year-end charts ====
Chart (1969)	Rank
Canada	78
US Cash Box Top 100	48

=== Certifications ===
Region	Certification	Certified units/sales
Denmark (IFPI Danmark)	Gold	45,000^{‡}
New Zealand (RMNZ)	2× Platinum	60,000^{‡}
United Kingdom (BPI)	Platinum	600,000^{‡}
^{‡} Sales+streaming figures based on certification alone.

== Other versions ==
- In the late 1960s, Judy Garland added the song to her repertoire, and went on to perform it in several concerts and on one television appearance on The Mike Douglas Show.
- Jackie Wilson recorded a modified ballad version, more uptempo than Tony Bennett, but downbeat compared to Stevie Wonder. It lost in a cover record war; Wilson reaching number 70 in late 1968, Wonder peaking at number 2 on Billboard's Hot 100.
- In 1969, Dorothy Squires recorded the song, arranged and conducted by Nicky Welsh on the President label, and had a chart hit in the UK reaching the No. 24 spot in an 11-week stay.
- In Shrek Forever After, the Stevie Wonder version plays over the ending credits.
- On June 17, 2012, The Voice Australia finalist Darren Percival performed a cover of the song reaching number 6 on the iTunes download list.
- Joaquin Phoenix recorded the song for the 2024 film Joker: Folie à Deux and its soundtrack.

== See also ==
- List of Cash Box Top 100 number-one singles of 1968
