= Down to Earth (Stevie Wonder album) =

1966 studio album by Stevie Wonder

Studio album by Stevie Wonder
- Released: November 16, 1966
- Recorded: 1965–1966
- Studios: Hitsville U.S.A., Detroit, Michigan
- Genres: Pop, R&B, soul
- Length: 33:13
- Label: Tamla
- Producers: Clarence Paul; Henry Cosby

Stevie Wonder chronology
Up-Tight (1966)	Down to Earth (1966)	I Was Made to Love Her (1967)

Singles from Down to Earth
- 1. "A Place in the Sun" Released: October 24, 1966; 2. "Hey Love" Released: February 9, 1967

Professional ratings
Review scores
Source	Rating
AllMusic	3/5 stars
Rolling Stone	2.5/5 stars

Down to Earth is the sixth studio album by American singer-songwriter Stevie Wonder, released on November 16, 1966, on the Tamla (Motown) label. The album was a departure from Wonder's earlier, teen pop-driven albums, and, along with its predecessor, Up-Tight, it re-established the sixteen-year-old Wonder, whose voice had recently changed, as a Motown hitmaker.

The album features the hit single "A Place in the Sun". Another single, "Hey Love", became a hit for Detroit soul singer Bettye LaVette in 1969 (released as a B-side to "With a Little Help from My Friends").

== Track listing ==
Side One

1. "A Place in the Sun" (Ron Miller, Bryan Wells) - 2:52
2. "Bang Bang" (Sonny Bono) - 2:42
3. "Down to Earth" (Miller, Avery Vanderberg) - 2:50
4. "Thank You Love" (Henry Cosby, Sylvia Moy, Stevie Wonder) - 2:55
5. "Be Cool, Be Calm (And Keep Yourself Together)" (Cosby, Moy, Wonder) - 2:43
6. "Sylvia" (Cosby, Moy, Wonder) - 2:34

Side Two

1. "My World Is Empty Without You" (Holland-Dozier-Holland) - 2:53
2. "The Lonesome Road" (Gene Austin, Nat Shilkret) - 3:06
3. "Angel Baby (Don't You Ever Leave Me)" (Cosby, Moy) - 2:45
4. "Mr. Tambourine Man" (Bob Dylan) - 2:30
5. "Sixteen Tons" (Merle Travis) - 2:42
6. "Hey Love" (Morris Broadnax, Clarence Paul, Wonder) - 2:41

== Personnel ==
- Stevie Wonder – harmonica, keyboards, drums, percussion, vocals
- The Originals – backing vocals
- The Andantes – backing vocals
- Benny Benjamin – drums
- James Jamerson – bass guitar
- The Funk Brothers – instrumentation
- Clarence Paul and Henry Cosby – producers
