= For Your Love (Stevie Wonder song) =

1995 single by Stevie Wonder

Single by Stevie Wonder

from the album Conversation Peace
- B-side: "For Your Love" (instrumental)
- Released: February 13, 1995
- Length: 5:18 (CD); 4:04 (7-inch)
- Label: Motown
- Songwriter: Stevie Wonder
- Producer: Stevie Wonder

Stevie Wonder singles chronology
"We Didn't Know" (1991)	"For Your Love" (1995)	"Tomorrow Robins Will Sing" (1995)

"For Your Love" is a song written, produced and performed by American musician Stevie Wonder, released in February 1995 by Motown as the first single from his 22nd album, Conversation Peace (1995). It peaked at number 23 on the UK Singles Chart and number 53 on the US Billboard Hot 100. The song won two Grammy awards for Best R&B Male Vocal Performance and Best R&B Song at the 38th Grammy Awards. Its music video was directed by Antoine Fuqua.

== Critical reception ==
Dave Sholin from the Gavin Report said, "The master is still at it. One of his best efforts in a long time should do well at Top 40, urban and A/C." The magazine's Fell and Rufer wrote, "This sounds like the beginning of a Wonder-full year as this is just the tip of a musical iceberg called Conversation Peace". Music & Media commented, "All those shameless imitations by more or less talented acid jazz cats only preluded the comeback of the grandmaster himself, now materialised by the kind of soul ballad patented by Wonder." Dele Fadele from NME viewed it as "a standard love song raised slightly above blandness by its intensity, and no relation to the Yardbirds tune." In a separate review, he said it "dripped with a kind of treacly blandness only an expensive air-conditioned studio could provide."

== Music video ==
The song's accompanying music video was directed by American film director Antoine Fuqua and produced by Propaganda Films in Los Angeles.

== Charts ==
=== Weekly charts ===
Chart (1995)	Peak position
Canada Top Singles (RPM)	12
Canada Adult Contemporary (RPM)	5
Europe (European Hit Radio)	7
France (SNEP)	22
Germany (GfK)	63
Iceland (Íslenski Listinn Topp 40)	22
Italy Airplay (Music & Media)	1
Netherlands (Dutch Top 40 Tipparade)	9
Netherlands (Single Top 100)	43
New Zealand (Recorded Music NZ)	10
Peru (UPI)	9
Scottish Singles Sales (Official Charts)	30
UK Singles (Official Charts)	23
UK Hip Hop/R&B (Official Charts)	3
US Billboard Hot 100	53
US Adult Contemporary (Billboard)	30
US Hot R&B/Hip-Hop Songs (Billboard)	11

=== Year-end charts ===
Chart (1995)	Position
Europe (European Hit Radio)	35
US Hot R&B Singles (Billboard)	43

== Certifications ==
Region	Certification	Certified units/sales
New Zealand (RMNZ)	Gold	15,000^{‡}
^{‡} Sales+streaming figures based on certification alone.
