= Uptight (Everything's Alright) =

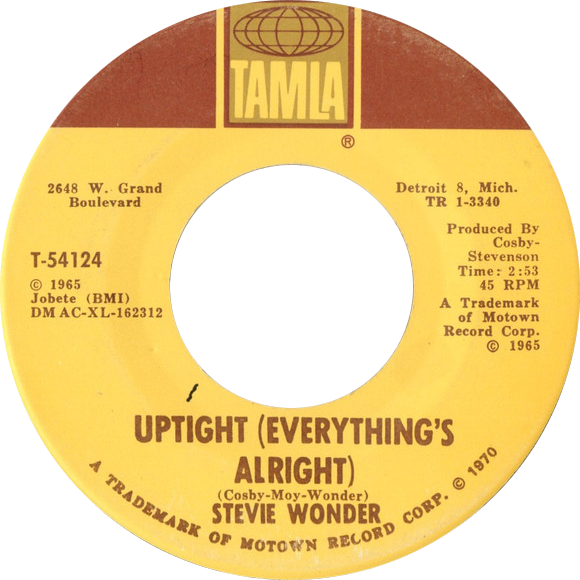
- One of label variants for a US reissue

Single by Stevie Wonder

from the album Up-Tight
- B-side: "Purple Rain Drops"
- Released: November 22, 1965
- Genre: Soul; funk
- Length: 2:52
- Label: Tamla
- Songwriters: Stevie Wonder; Sylvia Moy; Henry Cosby
- Producers: Mickey Stevenson; Henry Cosby

Stevie Wonder singles chronology
"Hi Heel Sneakers" (1965)	"Uptight (Everything's Alright)" (1965)	"Nothing's Too Good For My Baby" (1966)

Audio sample
- file; help

Audio video
- "Uptight (Everything's Alright)" on YouTube

"Uptight (Everything's Alright)" is a song recorded by American singer-songwriter Stevie Wonder for the Tamla (Motown) label in 1965. One of his most popular early singles, "Uptight (Everything's Alright)" was the first hit single that Wonder himself co-wrote.

A notable success, "Uptight (Everything's Alright)" peaked at number three on the US Billboard Pop Singles chart in early 1966, at the same time reaching the top of the Billboard R&B Singles chart for five weeks. Billboard ranked it as the 59th biggest American hit of 1966. An accompanying album, Up-Tight (1966), was rushed into production to capitalize on the single's success. It also garnered Wonder his first two career Grammy Award nominations for Best R&B Song and Best R&B Performance.

== Background ==
Wonder had a number-one hit in the United States with "Fingertips" in 1963, and two more singles in the top 40: "Workout, Stevie, Workout" (1963) and "Hey Harmonica Man" (1964). But in 1965, at age 15, his voice had begun to change, and Motown CEO Berry Gordy was worried that he would no longer be a commercially viable artist. As it turned out, however, producer Clarence Paul found it easier to work with Wonder's now-mature tenor voice, and Sylvia Moy and Henry Cosby set about writing a new song for the artist, based upon an instrumental riff that Wonder had devised. Nelson George, in Where Did Our Love Go? The Rise and Fall of the Motown Sound, recorded that Wonder had been inspired by the Rolling Stones' "(I Can't Get No) Satisfaction" after playing several tour dates with the Stones. As Wonder presented his ideas, finished or not, "he went through everything," remembered Moy. "I asked, 'Are you sure you don't have anything else?' He started singing and playing 'Everything is alright, uptight.' That was as much as he had. I said, 'That's it. Let's work with that.'" The resulting song, "Uptight (Everything's Alright)", features lyrics depicting a poor young man's appreciation for a rich girl seeing beyond his poverty.

On the day of the recording, Moy had completed the lyrics, but didn't have them in braille for Wonder to read, and so sang the song to him as he was recording it. She sang a line ahead of him, and he simply repeated the lines as he heard them. In 2008, Moy commented that "he never missed a beat" during the recording.

Cash Box described it as a "rhythmic, fast-moving, chorus backed pop-r&b ditty all about a lucky fella who’s got the world on a string."

== Personnel ==
- Stevie Wonder – vocals, keyboards
- James Jamerson – bass
- Benny Benjamin – drums
- The Funk Brothers – additional instrumentation
- Johnny Allen – horn arrangement
- The Andantes – background vocals

== Charts ==
=== Weekly charts ===
Chart (1965–1966)	Peak position
CAN RPM Top 100	50
UK Disc Weekly Top 30	13
UK Melody Maker Top 50	14
UK New Musical Express Top 30	13
UK Record Mirror Top 20 R&B	1
UK Record Retailer Top 50	14
US Billboard Hot 100	3
US Billboard Hot Rhythm & Blues Singles	1
US Cash Box Top 100 Singles	3
US Cash Box Top 50 R&B	1
US Record World 100 Top Pops	3
US Record World Top 40 R&B	1

=== Year-end charts ===
Chart (1966)	Rank
US Billboard Hot 100	59
US Cash Box	12

== Certifications ==
Region	Certification	Certified units/sales
New Zealand (RMNZ)	Gold	15,000^{‡}
United Kingdom (BPI)	Gold	400,000^{‡}
^{‡} Sales+streaming figures based on certification alone.

== Other notable versions ==
A note-for-note re-recording of Wonder's version was used as the backing track for Bill Cosby's 1967 musical comedy single, "Little Ole Man (Uptight, Everything's Alright)", which was a US number 4 hit. Bill Cosby is not related to the song's co-writer Henry Cosby.

In 1994, British reggae singer C. J. Lewis released a cover version under the title "Everything Is Alright (Uptight)". His version reached number 10 on the UK Singles Chart, becoming his second and final UK top-10 hit. It also entered the top 20 in Ireland, the Netherlands, and New Zealand.

In 1995, British rock band Oasis recorded a song titled "Step Out" which interpolated "Uptight", intended for inclusion on their second album (What's the Story) Morning Glory?. The song was omitted and replaced with excerpts from "The Swamp Song" due to the interpolation and would go unreleased for another year before showing up as a B-side to "Don't Look Back in Anger".
