= I Don't Know Why =

1969 single by Stevie Wonder

Single by Stevie Wonder

from the album For Once in My Life
- A-side: "My Cherie Amour"
- Released: January 28, 1969
- Recorded: 1968
- Genre: Soul, pop
- Length: 3:02 (single version); 2:48 (album version)
- Label: Tamla
- Songwriter(s): Stevie Wonder; Paul Riser; Don Hunter; Lula Hardaway
- Producer(s): Don Hunter; Stevie Wonder

Stevie Wonder singles chronology
"Shoo-Be-Doo-Be-Doo-Da-Day" (1968)	"I Don't Know Why" (1969)	"My Cherie Amour" (1969)

"I Don't Know Why" (sometimes listed as "Don't Know Why I Love You") is a song by American singer-songwriter Stevie Wonder, from the 1968 album For Once in My Life. It was released as a single on January 28, 1969, with "My Cherie Amour" on the B-side. A few months later, the single was re-issued with sides reversed because of the growing popularity of "My Cherie Amour", which became a Top Ten hit.

Cash Box stated that "Wonder is softened just a trifle on this slower and more dramatically developing ballad."

== Personnel ==
- Stevie Wonder – vocals, clavinet
- The Funk Brothers – all other instruments

== Charts ==
The single peaked at No. 39 on the US Billboard Hot 100. The song was recorded when Wonder was 18 years old, and became a moderate hit single, together with "You Met Your Match", another song from the album. It also showcases Wonder's talents on the clavinet.

Chart (1969)	Peak position
Belgium (Ultratop 50 Wallonia)	48
Canadian Singles Chart]	41
Netherlands (Dutch Top 40)	22
Netherlands (Single Top 100)	20
UK Singles (OCC)	14
US Billboard Hot 100	39
US Hot R&B/Hip-Hop Songs (Billboard)	16

== Rolling Stones version ==
"I Don't Know Why"

Single by the Rolling Stones

from the album Metamorphosis
- A-side: "Try a Little Harder"
- Released: May 1975
- Recorded: June 1969
- Studio: Olympic, London
- Genre: Rock
- Length: 3:01
- Label: ABKCO
- Songwriter(s): Stevie Wonder; Paul Riser; Don Hunter; Lula Hardaway
- Producer(s): Jimmy Miller

The Rolling Stones singles chronology
"Dance Little Sister" (1974)	"I Don't Know Why" (1975)	"Out of Time" (1975)

A rendition of "I Don't Know Why" by the Rolling Stones is included on their 1975 rarities compilation Metamorphosis. It was recorded on July 3, 1969, during the sessions for Let It Bleed. It was also the night that news broke of former guitarist Brian Jones' death, less than a month after he had been fired from the band.

The song was also used as the B-side for their 1975 single "Try A Little Harder", and peaked at No. 42 on the US Billboard Hot 100.
