= Shoo-Be-Doo-Be-Doo-Da-Day =

1968 single by Stevie Wonder

Single by Stevie Wonder

from the album For Once in My Life
- B-side: "Why Don't You Lead Me to Love"
- Released: April 30, 1968
- Recorded: 1968
- Genre: R&B; soul
- Length: 2:47
- Label: Tamla
- Songwriters: Stevie Wonder; Sylvia Moy; Henry Cosby
- Producer: Stevie Wonder

Stevie Wonder singles chronology
"I'm Wondering" (1967)	"Shoo-Be-Doo-Be-Doo-Da-Day" (1968)	"You Met Your Match" (1968)

"Shoo-Be-Doo-Be-Doo-Da-Day" is a 1968 single released by American and Motown recording artist Stevie Wonder. The song, co-written by Wonder and produced by Henry Cosby and Sylvia Moy, was the first to showcase Wonder's talents at the clavinet and was one of his first successful co-written tracks during his 1960s Motown period. The song reached number nine on the Billboard Hot 100 pop singles chart in 1968, and went to number one on the R&B chart.

Billboard described the single as "a groovy rock number loaded with teen sales appeal". Cash Box said it was a "delighting combination of Detroit and Gospel strains" with a "generally relaxed rock mood with snatches of fire from the ork build and outstanding vocal."

"Shoo-Be-Doo-Be-Doo-Da-Day" was one of the first songs to use a clavinet in a popular music recording.

== Personnel ==
- Lead vocals and clavinet by Stevie Wonder
- Backing vocals by the Andantes (Jackie Hicks, Marlene Barrow, and Louvain Demps)
- Other instrumentation by the Funk Brothers

== Chart positions ==
Chart (1968)	Peak position
U.S. Billboard Hot 100	9
U.S. Billboard Hot Rhythm & Blues Singles	1
