= I Was Made to Love Her (album) =

1967 studio album by Stevie Wonder

Studio album by Stevie Wonder
- Released: August 28, 1967
- Recorded: 1967
- Studios: Hitsville U.S.A., Detroit, Michigan
- Genre: Soul
- Length: 32:15
- Label: Tamla
- Producers: Henry Cosby; Clarence Paul

Stevie Wonder chronology
Down to Earth (1966)	I Was Made to Love Her (1967)	Someday at Christmas (1967)

Singles from I Was Made to Love Her
- 1. "I Was Made to Love Her" Released: May 18, 1967

Professional ratings
Review scores
Source	Rating
AllMusic	3/5 stars
Rolling Stone	(mixed)
The Village Voice	A−

I Was Made to Love Her is the seventh studio album by American musician Stevie Wonder, recorded at Hitsville U.S.A., Detroit, and released on August 28, 1967, under Tamla Records, a Motown subsidiary.

== Background ==
In 1967, Stevie Wonder was establishing himself as a teenage singer on Tamla Records, a subsidiary of Motown. Following the success of his 1965 single "Uptight (Everything's Alright)", he released several hit songs, including "I Was Made to Love Her" in May 1967. The single peaked at number two on the Billboard Hot 100 in the United States, topped the Billboard R&B Singles chart and reached number five on the UK Singles Chart.

The title track was co-written by Wonder, Henry Cosby, Sylvia Moy and Wonder's mother, Lula Mae Hardaway. Wonder later recalled that the song was inspired by a woman named Angie, who had been his first love. He drew on their experiences of maintaining a romantic relationship through telephone conversations between Detroit and California. Some of the lyrics were also influenced by stories about life in Arkansas shared by Moy's family.

Following the success of the single, Wonder recorded the studio album I Was Made to Love Her. It was released on August 28, 1967, through Tamla and recorded at Hitsville U.S.A. in Detroit. Production was handled by Henry Cosby and Clarence Paul.

The album contained 12 tracks, including the title song. Alongside songs co-written by Wonder, it featured interpretations of compositions by other artists. These included "Respect" by Otis Redding, "My Girl", written by Smokey Robinson and Ronald White, "Please, Please, Please" by James Brown, and "A Fool for You" by Ray Charles. The album also included "Baby Don't You Do It" and "Can I Get a Witness", both written by Holland–Dozier–Holland.

Wonder was accompanied by members of the Funk Brothers during the recording sessions. James Jamerson played bass guitar, while Benny Benjamin played drums. Eddie Willis performed guitar on the title track, and the Andantes provided backing vocals. In addition to lead vocals and harmonica, Wonder contributed piano, organ, clavinet, drums and percussion.

Music critic William Ruhlmann described the album as a release intended to capitalise on the success of its title track. He noted that most of the songs were interpretations of compositions by other artists, but observed that Wonder incorporated the musical styles of Ray Charles, James Brown and Otis Redding into his own performances. He also praised the then 17-year-old Wonder for absorbing the influences of established singers while continuing to develop his own distinctive musical talents.

== Track listing ==
Side one

1. "I Was Made to Love Her" (Wonder, Henry Cosby, Sylvia Moy, Lula Mae Hardaway) – 2:36
2. "Send Me Some Lovin'" (Lloyd Price, John Marascalco) – 2:29
3. "I'd Cry" (Wonder, Moy) – 2:33
4. "Everybody Needs Somebody (I Need You)" (Wonder, Clarence Paul) – 2:36
5. "Respect" (Otis Redding) – 2:21
6. "My Girl" (Smokey Robinson, Ronald White) – 2:55

Side two

1. "Baby Don't You Do It" (Holland-Dozier-Holland) – 2:11
2. "A Fool for You" (Ray Charles) – 3:16
3. "Can I Get a Witness" (Holland-Dozier-Holland) – 2:42
4. "I Pity the Fool" (Deadric Malone) – 3:04
5. "Please, Please, Please" (James Brown, John Terry) – 2:40
6. "Every Time I See You I Go Wild" (Wonder, Cosby, Moy) – 2:52

== Personnel ==
- Stevie Wonder – lead vocals, harmonica, piano, organ, clavinet, drums, percussion
- The Andantes – backing vocals
- James Jamerson – bass
- Benny Benjamin – drums
- Eddie Willis – guitar on "I Was Made to Love Her"
- All other instruments by the Funk Brothers
