= Clarence Paul =

American songwriter and producer (1928–1995)

- Also known as: CP
- Born: Clarence Otto Pauling; March 19, 1928; Winston-Salem, North Carolina, U.S.
- Died: May 6, 1995 (aged 67) Los Angeles, California, U.S.
- Occupations: Songwriter; record producer
- Label: Motown

Clarence Otto Pauling (March 19, 1928 – May 6, 1995), better known and published as Clarence Paul, was an American songwriter and record producer who was best known for his career with Detroit's Motown Records.

== Early life and career ==
Born in Winston-Salem, North Carolina, on March 19, 1928, Paul was the son of Lowman Pauling and Arsula Price. His brother was guitarist/songwriter Lowman Pauling Jr. The two brothers co-founded The "5" Royales singing group. Their father was a coal miner in Bluefield, West Virginia, where the brothers listened to country music on the town's only radio station. In Winston-Salem, the brothers formed the gospel group the Royal Sons Quintet, later to become The "5" Royales. Paul dropped the "ing" from his last name after moving to Detroit in the 1950s to avoid being confused with his older brother.

== Career ==
In 1958, Paul had one of his first major songwriting credits. He co-wrote and recorded "I Need Your Lovin'" for the Hanover label. It was covered less than a year later, in 1959, and became a number-14 R&B hit for Roy Hamilton. His other notable songs included "A Place in the Sun", "Hey, Love", and "Until You Come Back to Me (That's What I'm Gonna Do)".

At Motown, he gained fame as Stevie Wonder's mentor and main producer, during Wonder's teenage years. He co-wrote Wonder's first hit song, "Fingertips" (1963). He also sang backup vocals on Wonder's top-ten version of Bob Dylan's "Blowin' in the Wind", and Wonder's version of "Funny How Time Slips Away". Paul also produced early Temptations records and wrote/co-wrote such hits as "Until You Come Back to Me (That's What I'm Gonna Do)" originally for Wonder, and later given to Aretha Franklin who made it a No. 1 hit, and "Hitch Hike" for Marvin Gaye, later covered by The Rolling Stones, and others. Paul relocated from Detroit to Los Angeles in the early 1970s.

== Later life ==
Paul retired to Las Vegas, Nevada. He died of complications of heart disease and diabetes, at Cedars-Sinai Medical Center in Los Angeles, California on May 6, 1995, at the age of 67.

== Selected discography ==
=== Singles ===
Year	Title	Artist	Chart	Writers	Producers
1959	"I Need Your Lovin'"	Roy Hamilton	US No. 62	Clarence Paul, Sonny Woods, Kenny Martin	Joe Sherman
1962	"Hitch Hike"	Marvin Gaye	US No. 30	Clarence Paul, Mickey Stevenson, Marvin Gaye	Mickey Stevenson
1962	"I Call It Pretty Music, But the Old People Call It the Blues"	Little Stevie Wonder	US No. 101	Berry Gordy Jr., Clarence Paul	Clarence Paul
1963	"Fingertips"	Little Stevie Wonder	US No. 1	Clarence Paul, Hank Cosby	Berry Gordy Jr.
1964	"Once Upon a Time" c/w "What's the Matter with You Baby"	Marvin Gaye and Mary Wells	US No. 19	Paul, Stevenson, Barney Ales, Dave Hamilton	Mickey Stevenson
1965	"Pretty Little Baby"	Marvin Gaye	US No. 25	Paul, Gaye, David Hamilton	Clarence Paul
1965	"You've Been in Love Too Long"	Martha Reeves & The Vandellas	US No. 36	Paul, Stevenson, Ivy Jo Hunter	Paul, Stevenson, Hunter
1965	"Danger! Heartbreak Dead Ahead"	The Marvelettes	US No. 61	Paul, Stevenson, Hunter	Paul, Hunter
1966	"Just a Little Misunderstanding"	The Contours	US No. 85	Paul, Wonder, Morris Broadnax	Paul, Stevenson
1966	"Blowin' in the Wind"	Stevie Wonder	US No. 9, UK No. 36	Bob Dylan	Clarence Paul
1973	"Until You Come Back to Me (That's What I'm Gonna Do)"	Aretha Franklin	US No. 3	Paul, Wonder, Broadnax	Aretha Franklin, Arif Mardin, Jerry Wexler

=== Albums ===
Year	Title	Artist	Chart	Producers
1962	The Jazz Soul of Little Stevie	Stevie Wonder	-	Clarence Paul, Hank Cosby
1962	Tribute to Uncle Ray	Stevie Wonder	-	Clarence Paul, Hank Cosby
1965	With a Song in My Heart	Stevie Wonder	-	Clarence Paul, Mickey Stevenson
1966	Up-Tight	Stevie Wonder	US No. 33, UK No. 14	Paul, Cosby, Stevenson, Brian Holland, Lamont Dozier
1966	Down to Earth	Stevie Wonder	US No. 92	Clarence Paul, Hank Cosby
1967	Reach Out	The Four Tops	US No. 11, UK No. 4	Paul, Holland, Dozier, Smokey Robinson
1967	I Was Made to Love Her	Stevie Wonder	US No. 45	Clarence Paul, Hank Cosby
