= Lula Mae Hardaway =

American songwriter (1930–2006)

- Born: January 11, 1930; Eufaula, Alabama, U.S.
- Died: May 31, 2006 (aged 76); Los Angeles, California, U.S.
- Occupation: Songwriter
- Spouse: Calvin Judkins (divorced)
- Children: Stevie Wonder

Lula Mae Hardaway (January 11, 1930 – May 31, 2006) was an American songwriter and the mother of musician Stevie Wonder. She spent her early adult life in Saginaw, Michigan, but from 1975 until her death in 2006, lived in Los Angeles, California.

== Life ==
Lula Mae Hardaway was born in Eufaula, Alabama, on January 11, 1930, the daughter of sharecropper Noble Hardaway. Her childhood years were marked by hardship, and she was moved around among relatives. Lula had her first child Milton in 1948 who was fathered by Paul Hardaway, who, already married, abandoned her and the child (though she would later rekindle their relationship and they would go on to have another two children). An uncle took in Lula and Milton in Saginaw, Michigan, where she married the much older Calvin Judkins, father of her second and third children. The blindness of her third child, Stevland, is attributed to having been born weeks prematurely and then receiving too much oxygen in an incubator. After moving with family to Detroit, she divorced Judkins. It was in Detroit that the musical talents of Stevland – who by the age of 10 "was playing and singing gospel tunes in church, and then joining adults singing rhythm and blues on the street corners" – came to the notice of Berry Gordy, founder of Motown Records, who dubbed him "Little Stevie Wonder".

Hardaway co-wrote many of her son's songs during his teenage years, including the hit singles "I Was Made to Love Her", "Signed, Sealed, Delivered I'm Yours", "You Met Your Match" and "I Don't Know Why I Love You", co-writing four songs on the 1968 album For Once in My Life. For co-writing "Signed, Sealed, Delivered", she was co-nominated for the 1970 Grammy Award for Best R&B Song.

In 1974, Hardaway was with her then 23-year-old son at the Hollywood Palladium when he received his first Grammy Award, one of several he received that night.

== Legacy ==
Hardaway was the subject of a 2002 authorized biography entitled Blind Faith: The Miraculous Journey of Lula Hardaway, Stevie Wonder's Mother (ISBN 0-7435-2695-3), by Dennis Love and Stacy Brown.

When Hardaway died in 2006, she had 20 grandchildren and great-grandchildren. A service for her was held at West Angeles Church of God in Christ. There were remarks by Motown founder Berry Gordy and songs by gospel singer Yolanda Adams and others. Hardaway is interred at Forest Lawn Memorial Park in Glendale, California.
