= A Place in the Sun (Stevie Wonder song) =

Single by Stevie Wonder

from the album Down to Earth
- B-side: "Sylvia"
- Released: November 1966
- Genre: Soul
- Length: 2:59
- Label: Tamla
- Songwriters: Ron Miller; Bryan Wells
- Producer: Henry Cosby

Stevie Wonder singles chronology
"Blowin' in the Wind" (1966)	"A Place in the Sun" (1966)	"Someday at Christmas" (1966)

"A Place in the Sun" is a 1966 soul single by American and Motown musician Stevie Wonder. Written by Ronald Miller and Bryan Wells, it was one of Wonder's first songs to contain social commentary. "A Place in the Sun" was his third Top Ten hit since 1963, hitting number 9 on the Billboard pop singles chart and number 3 on the R&B charts. Billboard described the song as a "folk-oriented release" to which Wonder gives an "exciting treatment." The Originals and The Andantes sang background vocals on the recording. Before the repeat of the final Chorus, Stevie Wonder does a spoken recitation that goes: "You know when times are bad, and you're feeling sad, I want you to always remember". Stevie Wonder also recorded a version of the song in Italian titled "Il Sole è di Tutti" (The Sun is for Everyone).

== Chart positions ==
Chart (1966)	Peak position
U.S. Billboard Hot 100	9
U.S. Billboard Easy Listening	29
U.S. Billboard R&B Singles	3

== Cover versions ==
- The Rascals covered the song on their 1967 album Groovin'.
- Bill Cosby on his 1967 album Silver Throat: Bill Cosby Sings.
- Engelbert Humperdinck did his version of the song on his 1967 album The Last Waltz.
- Diana Ross & the Supremes & The Temptations on their 1968 album Diana Ross & the Supremes Join The Temptations, which hit number 2 on the Billboard "Top Pop Albums Charts".
- The Four Tops for their 1968 LP Yesterday's Dreams.
- The Staple Singers for their 1968 album What the World Needs Now Is Love.
- Glen Campbell from his 1968 album A New Place in the Sun.
- David Isaacs (singer) in 1968 on Lee "Scratch" Perry's Upsetter label.
- The Gabe Dixon Band in the end credits of the 2006 film Charlotte's Web.
- Jake Shimabukuro covered the song on his 2021 album Jake & Friends.
- The Con's Combo covered the song (Spanish title: Un Lugar en el Sol) on their 1967 album Los Fabulosos Suecos!.
