= I Was Made to Love Her (song) =

1967 single by Stevie Wonder

Single by Stevie Wonder

from the album I Was Made to Love Her
- B-side: "Hold Me"; "Travlin' Man" (Italy)
- Released: May 18, 1967
- Recorded: 1967
- Studio: Hitsville U.S.A. (Studio A), Detroit, Michigan
- Genre: Soul
- Length: 2:37
- Label: Tamla
- Songwriters: Stevie Wonder; Lula Mae Hardaway; Henry Cosby; Sylvia Moy
- Producer: Henry Cosby

Stevie Wonder singles chronology
| "Hey Love" (1967) | "I Was Made to Love Her" (1967) | "I'm Wondering" (1967) |

"I Was Made to Love Her" is a soul song recorded by American musician Stevie Wonder for Motown's Tamla label in 1967. The song was written by Wonder, his mother Lula Mae Hardaway, Sylvia Moy, and producer Henry Cosby and included on Wonder's 1967 album I Was Made to Love Her.

Released as a single, "I Was Made to Love Her" peaked at No. 2 on the Billboard Pop Singles chart in July 1967. The song was held out of the top spot by "Light My Fire" by the Doors and spent four non-consecutive weeks at No. 1 on the Hot Rhythm & Blues Singles chart in the United States. The song reached No. 5 in the UK, Wonder's first top-10 hit in that country.

Cash Box called it a "driving, wailing, pulsing R&B workout."

When asked in a 1968 interview which of his songs stood out in his mind, Wonder answered: "'I Was Made to Love Her' because it's a true song." The last lyric line "You know Stevie ain't gonna leave her" was ad libbed by Wonder.

== Personnel ==
- Stevie Wonder – lead vocals, clavinet, harmonica
- The Andantes – backing vocals
- Instrumentation by the Funk Brothers
  - James Jamerson – bass
  - Benny Benjamin – drums
  - Eddie Willis – guitar

== Charts ==
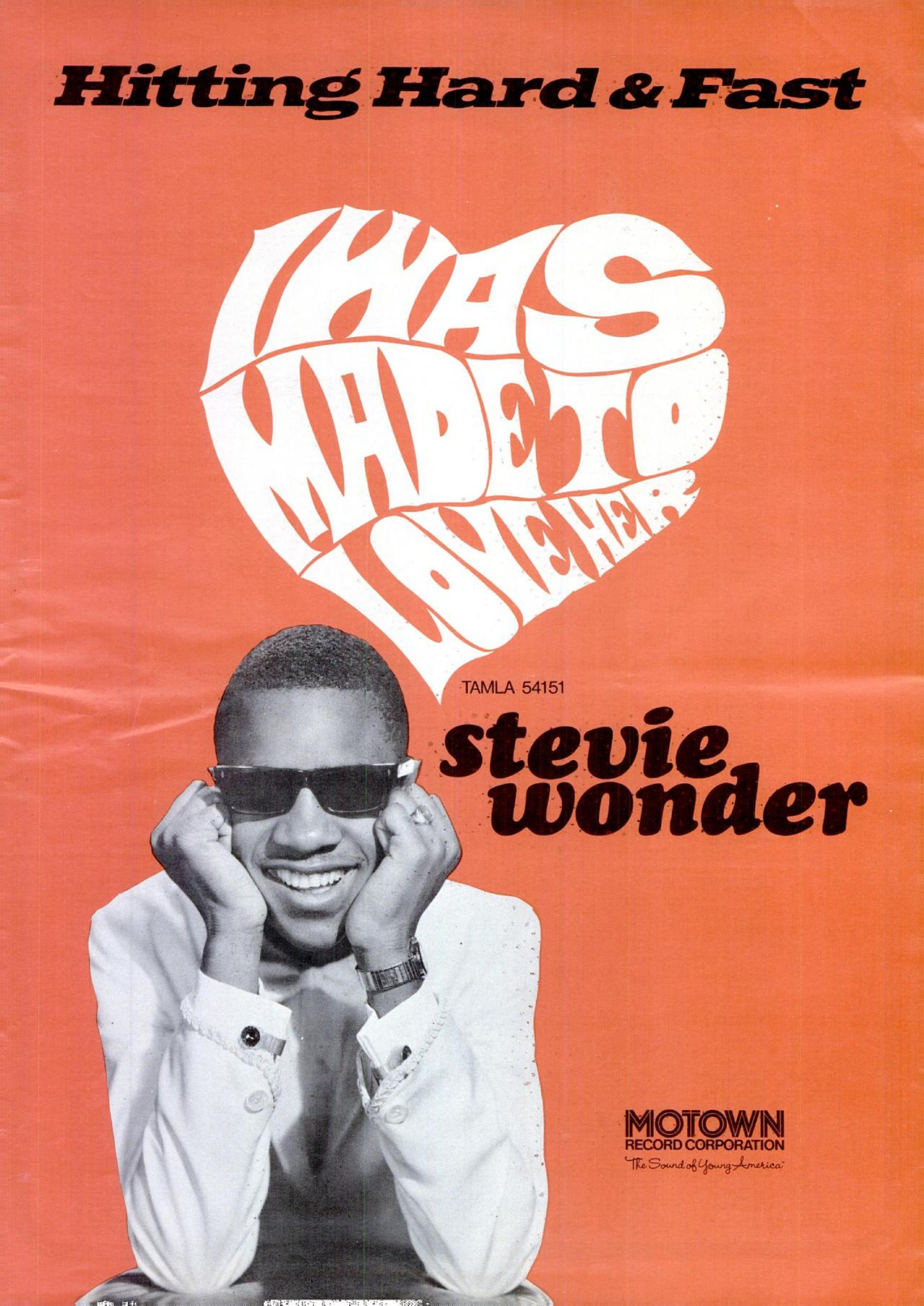
Advertisement for the song in Billboard Magazine

Weekly charts

| Chart (1967) | Peak position |
|---|---|
| Australia (Go-Set) | 40 |
| Canada RPM Top Singles | 5 |
| New Zealand (Listener) | 16 |
| UK Singles Chart | 5 |
| US Billboard Hot 100 | 2 |
| US Billboard R&B Singles | 1 |

Year-end charts

| Chart (1967) | Rank |
|---|---|
| Canada | 56 |
| US Billboard Hot 100 | 14 |
