= Ron Miller (songwriter) =

American songwriter and record producer

- Born: Ronald Norman Gould; October 5, 1932; Chicago, Illinois, U.S.
- Died: July 23, 2007 (aged 74); Santa Monica, California, U.S.
- Occupations: Songwriter; record producer
- Spouse: Aurora Riviera (separated)
- Children: 6
- Relatives: Sandy Hackett (son-in-law)

Ronald Norman Miller (October 5, 1932 – July 23, 2007) was an American popular songwriter and record producer who wrote for Motown artists in the 1960s and 1970s and attained many Top 10 hits. Some of his songs, such as "For Once in My Life", have become pop standards.

Ron Miller was described by his daughter Lisa Dawn Miller-Hackett as "a young, Jewish songwriter with a very Rodgers & Hammerstein musical theater writing style" who "wrote of peace and hope for a better tomorrow during a time of war and the Civil Rights Movement. He didn't just write about it. He lived it."

== Biography and career ==
Born as Ronald Norman Gould in Chicago, Ron Miller was the only son of Sue and Harry Gould. Harry died when Miller and his sisters were still very young; and after his mother remarried Joe Miller, Miller adopted his stepfather's surname. Ron Miller served in the U.S. Marines and then sold washing machines and worked odd jobs before he was discovered by Motown founder Berry Gordy.

After his discovery by Gordy and Motown executive Mickey Stevenson in Chicago in the early 1960s, Miller was invited to write songs for Gordy's new company, Motown, and became its first white staff writer. The night Miller's daughter Angel was born, Miller penned the lyrics to "For Once in My Life", to music by Orlando Murden. "For Once in My Life" was first recorded at Motown by Barbara McNair before being redone in a more upbeat style by Stevie Wonder. The number ended up being a huge and enduring hit. It is one of the most covered songs in pop history with more than 270 recorded versions. A rendition by Tony Bennett and Wonder won a Grammy Award in 2007.

Miller collaborated with composer Bryan Wells on some other Stevie Wonder hit songs, such as "A Place in the Sun", "Yester-Me, Yester-You, Yesterday" and the holiday anthem "Someday at Christmas", which was later covered by many other artists, including Justin Bieber. In 2015, Wonder did a duet version of "Someday at Christmas" with Andra Day; portions of this rendition appeared in a commercial for Apple TV.

Miller wrote and composed Stevie Wonder's 1970 hit single "Heaven Help Us All". A version of "Heaven Help Us All" by Ray Charles and Gladys Knight later won a Grammy Award for best gospel performance in 2005.

Miller also co-wrote Diana Ross' 1973 hit "Touch Me in the Morning" and Charlene's "I've Never Been To Me".

Miller created the title track for Walter Jackson's 1977 album I Want to Come Back As a Song.

Miller authored the lyrics to "Can't We Try", which was used on Teddy Pendergrass' 1978 TP album and also featured on the soundtrack to the 1980 film Roadie.

During the 1970s, Miller wrote lyrics for several musicals, including Cherry and Daddy Goodness. With lyrics by Miller and compositions by Tom Baird, Cherry was launched in 1970 as a musical version of William Inge's Bus Stop but never made it to Broadway. "I've Never Been a Woman Before" from Cherry was recorded by both Shirley Bassey (on her 1972 I Capricorn album) and two years later by Barbra Streisand for The Way We Were.

Adapted from the same-titled play by Richard Wright and Louis Sapin, the Daddy Goodness musical ran into severe trouble while still in tryouts on the road in Philadelphia and Washington D.C., where it closed without ever getting to Broadway, even though it had been scheduled to open on the Great White Way at the Winter Garden Theatre on October 25, 1979. The song "Hungry" from Daddy Goodness was recorded by both Freda Payne and Charlene.

Miller once again collaborated with composer Ken Hirsch, his partner for "I've Never Been to Me" and Daddy Goodness, on the musical Clothespins and Dreams, which premiered in 1990 at the California Music Theatre in Pasadena, California, after snippets from the show had already been presented at a meeting of the National Alliance of Music Theaters in Century City in 1988.

Miller authored the lyrics to "If I Could" as a tribute to his own children. Co-written with Hirsch and Marti Sharron, the ballad was recorded by Barbra Streisand on her number-one hit album Higher Ground (1997) and later by Celine Dion for her top ten 2004 Miracle album. The song has also been covered by many other artists, including Ray Charles, Michael Bolton, Regina Belle, Nancy Wilson and Miller's own daughter, Lisa Dawn Miller-Hackett, on her CD entitled Fly Away.

Ron Miller died on July 23, 2007, of cardiac arrest at Santa Monica UCLA Medical Center, after a long battle with emphysema and cancer.

== Personal life ==
After an earlier union ended in divorce, Miller married Aurora Rivera, from whom he separated. Miller had six children: Angel, Lisa, Mark, Debbie, Julie and Gary. At the time of his death, Miller's companion was Janis Waller.

In 2005, his daughter Lisa married Sandy Hackett, son of Buddy Hackett.

Miller had seven grandchildren.

Mr. Miller's cause of death was a heart attack after battling lung cancer and emphysema for an undisclosed length of time.

== Selected list of Miller songs ==
- "A Place in the Sun" (Ron Miller, Bryan Wells) – Stevie Wonder, 1966, US #9, UK #20
- "Someday at Christmas" (Ron Miller, Bryan Wells) - Stevie Wonder, 1966, #24 on Billboard Christmas singles chart
- "For Once in My Life" (Ron Miller, Orlando Murden) – Stevie Wonder, 1968, US #2, UK #3
- "Yester-Me, Yester-You, Yesterday" (Ron Miller, Bryan Wells) – Stevie Wonder, 1969, US #7, UK #2
- "Heaven Help Us All" (Ron Miller) – Stevie Wonder, 1970, US #9, UK #29
- "Touch Me in the Morning" (Ron Miller, Michael Masser) – Diana Ross, 1973, US #1, UK #9
- "Don't Burn Down the Bridge" (Ron Miller) - Gladys Knight & the Pips, 1973
- "I Want to Come Back As a Song" (Ron Miller) - Walter Jackson, 1977
- "Can't We Try" (Ron Miller, Ken Hirsch) - Teddy Pendergrass, 1978. From the album TP, US #14
- "I've Never Been to Me" (Ron Miller, Ken Hirsch) – Charlene, 1982, US #3, UK #1, Canada #1, Australia #1, Ireland #1
- "You Moved A Mountain" (Denzil Miller, Jr., Jermaine Jackson, Ron Miller) - Jermaine Jackson, 1982. From the album Let Me Tickle Your Fancy, US #46.
- "Put Me On" (Kerry Brothers, Bertram Reid, Woodrow Cunningham, Norman Durham, Ron Miller, Alicia Keys) - Mario, 2002. The album Mario peaked at US #9.
- "If I Could" (Ron Miller, Ken Hirsch, Marti Sharron) – Barbra Streisand 1997, #1 US album Higher Ground; Celine Dion, 2004, #4 US album Miracle

== See also ==
- Stevie Wonder discography
