= The Complete Stevie Wonder =

Compilation album by Stevie Wonder
- Released: October 12, 2005
- Recorded: 1961–2005
- Genres: R&B, soul
- Length: 39:08:21
- Label: Motown

Stevie Wonder chronology
A Time to Love (2005)	The Complete Stevie Wonder (2005)	Songs in the Key of Life – The EP (2026)

The Complete Stevie Wonder is a digital compilation featuring the work of Stevie Wonder. Released a week before the physical release of A Time to Love, the set comprises almost all of Wonder's officially released material, including single mixes, extended versions, remixes, and Workout Stevie Workout, a 1963 album that was shelved and replaced by With a Song in My Heart. The set also contains a digital (PDF) booklet and three music videos: "Overjoyed", "Part-Time Lover" and "So What the Fuss".

== Disc listing ==
For more information on each album, go to their respective main articles.

- Disc 1: The Jazz Soul of Little Stevie Wonder
- Disc 2: Tribute to Uncle Ray
- Disc 3: The 12 Year Old Genius (Live)
- Disc 4: Workout Stevie Workout (Previously unreleased)
- Disc 5: With a Song in My Heart
- Disc 6: Stevie at the Beach
- Disc 7: Up-Tight
- Disc 8: Down to Earth
- Disc 9: I Was Made to Love Her
- Disc 10: Someday at Christmas
- Disc 11: Eivets Rednow
- Disc 12: For Once in My Life
- Disc 13: My Cherie Amour
- Disc 14: Stevie Wonder Live
- Disc 15: Signed, Sealed, and Delivered
- Disc 16: Live at the Talk of the Town
- Disc 17: Where I'm Coming From
- Disc 18: Music of My Mind
- Disc 19: Talking Book
- Disc 20: Innervisions
- Disc 21: Fulfillingness' First Finale
- Discs 22 & 23: Songs in the Key of Life
- Discs 24 & 25: Journey through the Secret Life of Plants
- Disc 26: Hotter than July
- Discs 27 & 28: Stevie Wonder's Original Musiquarium
- Disc 29: The Woman in Red
- Disc 30: In Square Circle
- Disc 31: Characters
- Disc 32: Jungle Fever
- Disc 33: Conversation Peace
- Discs 34 & 35: Natural Wonder
- Disc 36: A Time to Love

=== Workout Stevie Workout track listing ===
1. "Workout Stevie Workout" (Clarence Paul, Henry Cosby) – 2:43
2. "I Call It Pretty Music, But the Old People Call It the Blues" (Berry Gordy, Paul) – 2:30
3. "Contract on Love" (Brian Holland, Lamont Dozier, Janie Bradford) – 2:15
4. "I'll Always Be in Love" (Paul, Cosby) – 2:43
5. "Old Folks" (D. Lee Hill, W. Robison) – 3:00
6. "Monkey Talk" (Paul) – 2:44
7. "Let Me Loose" (Instrumental) (Paul) – 2:43
8. "Birth of the Blues" (Instrumental) (L. Brown, B. DeSylvia, R. Henderson) – 3:43
9. "Mack the Knife" (Instrumental) (Weill Blitzstein) – 2:56
10. "Your Cheatin' Heart" (Instrumental) (Hank Williams) – 2:14
11. "Undecided" (Instrumental) (Sydney Robin, Charles Shavers) – 2:15
12. "Satin Doll" (Instrumental) (J. Mercer, D. Ellington, B. Strayhorn) – 2:39

=== Bonus material ===
==== Discs 37–39 ====
Mono singles
No.	Title	Writer(s)	Original album	Length
1.	"I Call It Pretty Music But the Old People Call It the Blues, Pt. 1"	Berry Gordy; Clarence Paul	Tribute to Uncle Ray	2:32
2.	"I Call It Pretty Music But the Old People Call It the Blues, Pt. 2"	Gordy; Paul	Tribute to Uncle Ray	2:50
3.	"Little Water Boy"	Paul	Previously unreleased	2:38
4.	"La La La La"	Paul	Recorded Live: The 12 Year Old Genius	2:19
5.	"Contract on Love"	Brian Holland; Lamont Dozier; Janie Bradford	Tribute to Uncle Ray	2:15
6.	"Sunset"	Wonder; Paul	Tribute to Uncle Ray	2:54
7.	"Fingertips, Pt. 1"	Cosby; Paul	Recorded Live: The 12 Year Old Genius	3:20
8.	"Fingertips, Pt. 2"	Cosby; Paul	Recorded Live: The 12 Year Old Genius	3:11
9.	"Work Out, Stevie, Work Out"	Cosby; Paul	Workout Stevie Workout	2:44
10.	"Monkey Talk"	Paul	Workout Stevie Workout	2:43
11.	"Castles in the Sand"	Hal Davis; Marc Gordon; Mary O'Brien; Frank Wilson	Stevie at the Beach	2:11
12.	"Thank You (for Loving Me All the Way)"	Paul; William Stevenson; Eddie Holland	Previously unreleased	2:56
13.	"Hey Harmonica Man"	Marty Cooper; Lou Josie	Stevie at the Beach	2:33
14.	"This Little Girl"	Ray Charles	Previously unreleased	2:56
15.	"Happy Street"	Julius Stein; George Everette Hemric	Stevie at the Beach	2:26
16.	"Sad Boy"	Dorsey Burnette; Gerald Nelson	Stevie at the Beach	2:31
17.	"Pretty Little Angel"	Wonder; Paul; Mike Valvano	Up-Tight	2:11
18.	"Tears in Vain"	Paul	Previously unreleased	2:29
19.	"Kiss Me Baby"	Wonder; Paul	Greatest Hits (1983)	2:14
20.	"High Heel Sneakers"	Robert Higginbotham	1962-1974 Wonderland	3:04
21.	"Funny How Time Slips Away"	Willie Nelson	Previously unreleased	3:49
22.	"Music Talk"	Wonder; Paul; Ted Hull	Up-Tight	2:58
23.	"Uptight (Everything's Alright)"	Wonder; Cosby; Moy	Up-Tight	2:54
24.	"Purple Rain Drops"	Paul; Hull	Previously unreleased	3:08
25.	"Nothing's Too Good for My Baby"	Cosby; Moy; Stevenson	Up-Tight	2:40
26.	"With a Child's Heart"	Cosby; Moy; Vicki Basemore	Up-Tight	3:04
27.	"Blowin' in the Wind"	Robert Zimmerman	Up-Tight	3:05
28.	"Ain't That Asking for Trouble"	Wonder; Cosby; Moy	Up-Tight	2:49
29.	"A Place in the Sun"	Ron Miller; Bryan Wells	Down to Earth	3:10
30.	"Sylvia"	Wonder; Cosby; Moy	Down to Earth	2:34
31.	"Someday at Christmas"	R. Miller; Wells	Someday at Christmas	2:49
32.	"Travelin' Man"	R. Miller; Wells	Looking Back	2:55
33.	"Hey Love"	Wonder; Paul; Morris Broadnax	Down to Earth	2:55
34.	"I Was Made to Love Her"	Wonder; Hardaway; Cosby; Moy	I Was Made to Love Her	2:38
35.	"Hold Me"	Wonder; Paul; Morris Broadnax	Up-Tight	2:36
36.	"I'm Wondering"	Wonder; Cosby; Moy	Released as a single	2:54
37.	"Every Time I See You, I Go Wild!"	Wonder; Cosby; Moy	I Was Made to Love Her	2:52
38.	"Shoo-Be-Doo-Be-Doo-Da-Day"	Wonder; Cosby; Moy	For Once in My Life	2:47
39.	"Why Don't You Lead Me to Love?"	Wonder; Hardaway; Cosby; Moy	Previously unreleased	3:11
40.	"You Met Your Match"	Wonder; Hardaway; Don Hunter	For Once in My Life	2:43
41.	"My Girl"	William Robinson Jr.; Ronald White	I Was Made to Love Her	2:56
42.	"Alfie"	Burt Bacharach; Hal David	Eivets Rednow	3:13
43.	"More Than a Dream"	Wonder; Cosby	Eivets Rednow	3:39
44.	"For Once in My Life"	R. Miller; Murden	For Once in My Life	2:48
45.	"Angie Girl"	Wonder; Cosby; Moy	My Cherie Amour	3:!0
46.	"I Don't Know Why"	Wonder; Hardaway; Hunter; Paul Riser	For Once in My Life	2:48
47.	"My Cherie Amour"	Wonder; Cosby; Moy	My Cherie Amour	2:53
48.	"Yester-Me, Yester-You, Yesterday"	R. Miller; Wells	My Cherie Amour	3:04
49.	"I'd Be a Fool Right Now"	Wonder; Cosby; Moy	For Once in My Life	2:53
50.	"Never Had a Dream Come True"	Wonder; Cosby; Moy	Signed, Sealed & Delivered	3:12
51.	"Somebody Knows, Somebody Cares"	Wonder; Hardaway; Cosby; Moy	My Cherie Amour	2:34
52.	"Signed, Sealed, Delivered (I'm Yours)"	Wonder; Hardaway; Wright; Lee Garrett	Signed, Sealed & Delivered	2:47
53.	"I'm More Than Happy (I'm Satisfied)"	Wonder; Cosby; Moy; Cameron Grant	For Once in My Life	2:57
54.	"Heaven Help Us All"	R. Miller	Signed, Sealed & Delivered	3:14
55.	"I Gotta Have a Song"	Wonder; Hardaway; Hunter; Riser	Signed, Sealed & Delivered	2:33
56.	"We Can Work It Out"	Lennon–McCartney	Signed, Sealed & Delivered	2:55
57.	"Never Dreamed You'd Leave in Summer"	Wonder; Wright	Where I'm Coming From	2:54
58.	"If You Really Love Me"	Wonder; Wright	Where I'm Coming From	3:01
59.	"Think of Me As Your Soldier"	Wonder; Wright	Where I'm Coming From	3:38
60.	"What Christmas Means to Me"	Allen Story; Anna Gordy; George Gordy	Someday at Christmas	2:30
61.	"Bedtime for Toys"	R. Miller; Orlando Murden	Someday at Christmas	3:29

==== Discs 40–43 ====
All tracks written by Wonder, unless otherwise noted.

Additional singles and rarities
No.	Title	Writer(s)	Original release	Length
1.	"I Call It Pretty Music But the Old People Call It the Blues, Pt. 2 (Alternate version)"	Berry Gordy; Clarence Paul	Switched on Blues	5:10
2.	"Don't You Know (Live at the Apollo)"	Ray Charles	The Motor-Town Revue, Vol. 1--Live at the Apollo	3:24
3.	"Fingertips, Pts. 1 & 2 (Live, stereo mix)"	Henry Cosby; Paul	Cooley High soundtrack	6:28
4.	"Lois"	Wonder; Paul; Vicki Basemore	Never-Before Released Masters from Motown's Brightest Stars	2:26
5.	"Motor Town Revue Tour Promo (Promo version)"			0:36
6.	"I Call It Pretty Music But the Old People Call It the Blues (Live, Motor Town Revue, Vol. 2)"	Gordy; Paul	Motortown Revue, Vol. 2	2:26
7.	"Moon River (Live)"	Henry Mancini; Johnny Mercer	Motortown Revue, Vol. 2	4:51
8.	"Don't You Feel It!"	Robert Staunton; Robert Walker	Never-Before Released Masters from Motown's Brightest Stars	2:30
9.	"I Gave Up Quality for Quantity"	William Robinson Jr.	A Cellarful of Motown! volume 2	2:48
10.	"Greetings to the Tamla-Motown Appreciation Society (Promo version)"			0:42
11.	"High Heel Sneakers (Live)"	Robert Higginbotham	Motortown Revue in Paris	3:29
12.	"Funny How Time Slips Away (Live)"	Willie Nelson	Motortown Revue in Paris	4:03
13.	"Fingertips"	Cosby; Paul	Motortown Revue in Paris	6:04
14.	"Purple Rain Drops"	Paul; Ted Hull	The Motown Box	3:18
15.	"I Hear a Symphony"	Holland–Dozier–Holland	Motown Sings Motown Treasures	2:39
16.	"Are You Sure Love Is the Name of This Game"	Robinson Jr.	A Cellarful of Motown!	2:36
17.	"Until You Come Back to Me (That's What I'm Gonna Do)"	Wonder; Paul; Morris Broadnax	Looking Back: Anthology	2:59
18.	"I'm Wondering"	Wonder; Cosby; Moy	Stevie Wonder's Greatest Hits	2:55
19.	"Travelin' Man"	Ron Miller; Bryan Wells	Stevie Wonder's Greatest Hits Volume 2	2:51
20.	"Swing Low, Sweet Chariot"	Wallace Willis	In Loving Memory	2:59
21.	"Feeling Good"	Anthony Newley; Leslie Bricusse	Tamla-Motown Festival Tokyo '68	2:22
22.	"A Place in the Sun"	R. Miller; Wells	Tamla-Motown Festival Tokyo '68	3:17
23.	"I Was Made to Love Her"	Wonder; Lula Mae Hardaway; Cosby; Moy	Tamla-Motown Festival Tokyo '68	3:22
24.	"Blowin' in the Wind"	Robert Zimmerman	Tamla-Motown Festival Tokyo '68	5:51
25.	"Alfie"	Burt Bacharach; Hal David	Tamla-Motown Festival Tokyo '68	5:17
26.	"Uptight (Everything's Alright)"	Wonder; Cosby; Moy	Tamla-Motown Festival Tokyo '68	3:06
27.	"If I Ruled the World"	Wonder; William Lewis; Menton Smith	Looking Back: Anthology	3:36
28.	"For Once in My Life"	R. Miller; Orlando Murden	Motortown Revue Live	3:29
29.	"Shoo-Be-Doo-Be-Doo-Da-Day"	Wonder; Cosby; Moy	Motortown Revue Live	4:44
30.	"Uptight (Everything's Alright)"	Wonder; Cosby; Moy	Motortown Revue Live	3:06
31.	"Just Enough to Ease the Pain"	Wonder; Angela Satterwhite	The Complete Motown Anthology	3:07
32.	"I'm Gonna Make You Love Me" (with Diana Ross)	Kenny Gamble; Jerry J. Ross	Motown at the Hollywood Palace	3:45
33.	"Don't Know Why I Love You"	Wonder; Hardaway; Don Hunter; Paul Riser	Motown at the Hollywood Palace	3:04
34.	"For Once in My Life" (with Diana Ross)	R. Miller; Murden	Motown at the Hollywood Palace	2:53
35.	"Il Sole E'Di Tutti" (Italian language version of "A Place in the Sun")	R. Miller; Wells		3:03
36.	"Passo Le Mie Notti Qui Da Solo" (Italian language version of "Music Talk")	Wonder; Paul; Ted Hull		3:00
37.	"Dove Vai" (Italian language version of "Travelin' Man")	R. Miller; Wells		2:53
38.	"Non Sono un Angelo" (Italian language version of "I'm Wondering")	Wonder; Cosby; Moy		3:07
39.	"Se Tu Ragazza Mia" (Italian language version of "My Girl")	Robinson Jr.; Ronald White		3:48
40.	"Solo Te, Solo Me, Solo Noi" (Italian language version of "Yester-Me, Yester-You, Yesterday")	R. Miller; Wells		3:02
41.	"My Cherie Amor" (Italian language version)	Wonder; Cosby; Moy		2:55
42.	"Mi Ayer, Tu Ayer, el Ayer" (Spanish language version of "Yester-Me, Yester-You, Yesterday")	R. Miller; Wells		3:01
43.	"Mi Querido Amor" (Spanish language version)	Wonder; Cosby; Moy		2:55
44.	"Por Primera Vez" (Spanish language version of "For Once in My Life")	R. Miller; Murden		2:56
45.	"Un Lugar en el Sol" (Spanish language version of "A Place in the Sun")	R. Miller; Wells		3:17
46.	"I've Got to Find Him (Promo version)"	Judy Hasson; Joe Porter	Aired on WKNR Detroit	2:59
47.	"To Know You Is to Love You" (performed by Syreeta)	Wonder; Syreeta Wright	Syreeta	6:05
48.	"Boogie On Reggae Woman (Single version with alternate intro)"		7" single	4:53
49.	"Harmour Love" (performed by Syreeta)		One to One	3:39
50.	"Pops, We Love You (7" single mix)" (with Diana Ross, Marvin Gaye and Smokey Robinson)	Marilyn McLeod; Pam Sawyer	Single	3:30
51.	"I Ain't Gonna Stand for It"		12" single, track originally from Hotter Than July	4:37
52.	"All I Do"	Wonder; Paul; Broadnax	12" single, track originally from Hotter Than July	5:16
53.	"Ebony and Ivory" (with Paul McCartney)	McCartney	Tug of War	3:42
54.	"Used to Be" (performed by Charlene featuring Stevie Wonder)	Ronald Miller; Ken Hirsch	Single	4:02
55.	"Stay Gold"		Song Review: A Greatest Hits Collection, track originally from The Outsiders	3:35
56.	"Upset Stomach"		The Last Dragon soundtrack	6:34
57.	"You Will Know"		12" single	4:06
58.	"My Eyes Don't Cry"		Single, track originally from Characters	4:33
59.	"Keep Our Love Alive"		Single	4:01
60.	"Feeding Off the Love of the Land"		Single	5:52
61.	"Too High" (with Boyz II Men and Norman Brown)		Just Between Us, track originally from Innervisions	5:13
62.	"Dream Come True" (with The Temptations)	Berry Gordy, Jr.	The Music, The Magic, The Memories of Motown: A Tribute to Berry Gordy	4:15
63.	"Stubborn Kind of Fellow"	Marvin Gay Jr.; William "Mickey" Stevenson; George Gordy	Inner City Blues: The Music of Marvin Gaye	3:02
64.	"Kiss Lonely Good-bye (Soundtrack version)"		Promo CD	5:03
65.	"Kiss Lonely Good-bye (Soundtrack orchestral version without harmonica)"		Promo CD	4:40
66.	"Kiss Lonely Good-bye (Soundtrack orchestral version with harmonica)"		Promo CD	4:40
67.	"Hold On to Your Dream (1996 Song Review version)"		The Adventures of Pinocchio soundtrack	4:22
68.	"Hold On to Your Dream (Orchestral version)"		The Adventures of Pinocchio soundtrack	4:24
69.	"Redemption Song (Soundtrack version)"	Robert Marley	Song Review: A Greatest Hits Collection	3:48
70.	"True to Your Heart" (with 98º)	Matthew Weiner; David Zippel	98 Degrees and Rising	4:16
71.	"If Ever"	Wonder; Stephanie Andrews	Ballad Collection	4:47
72.	"To Feel the Fire"		Ballad Collection (Japan release)	3:48
73.	"To Feel the Fire (Alternate gospel version)"		Ballad Collection (Japan, 2-disc expanded edition)	3:43
74.	"Jesus Children of America"		Love and Freedom (BeBe Winans)	4:53
75.	"Misrepresented People"	Wonder; Gary Byrd	Bamboozled soundtrack	4:38
76.	"Some Years Ago"		Bamboozled soundtrack	5:03
77.	"The Christmas Song (Chestnuts Roasting on an Open Fire)"	Mel Tormé; Robert Levinson	Voyage to India (Target exclusive)	2:42
78.	"Seasons Greetings from Motown"		1977 promo single	1:21
79.	"Merry Christmas/Happy Kwanzaa"		1977 promo single	0:42
80.	"Merry Christmas and Happy New Year"		1977 promo single	0:20
81.	"Happy Holidays (UK promotional single)"		1977 promo single	0:27

==== Disc 44–48 ====
All tracks written by Wonder, unless otherwise noted.

Remixes
No.	Title	Writer(s)	Original release	Length
1.	"Pops, We Love You (12" disco single remix)" (with Diana Ross, Marvin Gaye and Smokey Robinson)	Marilyn McLeod; Pam Sawyer	Pops, We Love You	6:34
2.	"Master Blaster (Jammin') (12" remix)"		Hotter Than July	6:15
3.	"Master Blaster (Jammin') (12" dub remix)"		Hotter Than July	6:29
4.	"Love Light in Flight (12" remix)"		The Woman in Red soundtrack	6:36
5.	"Love Light in Flight (12" instrumental remix)"		The Woman in Red soundtrack	7:39
6.	"Don't Drive Drunk (12" remix)"		Single	8:21
7.	"Don't Drive Drunk (12" instrumental remix)"		Single	8:20
8.	"Did I Hear You Say You Love Me? (12" remix)"		Hotter Than July	8:44
9.	"Part-Time Lover (12" remix)"		In Square Circle	8:20
10.	"Part-Time Lover (12" instrumental remix)"		In Square Circle	8:16
11.	"Go Home (12" remix)"		In Square Circle	9:27
12.	"Go Home (12" instrumental remix)"		In Square Circle	8:37
13.	"Land of La La (12" remix)"		In Square Circle	8:38
14.	"Land of La La (12" instrumental remix)"		In Square Circle	8:38
15.	"Skeletons (12" remix)"		Single, track originally from Characters	6:45
16.	"Skeletons (12" instrumental remix)"		Single, track originally from Characters	6:43
17.	"Get It (12" remix)" (with Michael Jackson)		Single, track originally from Characters	6:47
18.	"Get It (12" instrumental remix)" (with Michael Jackson)		Single, track originally from Characters	6:46
19.	"My Eyes Don't Cry (12" remix)"		Single, track originally from Characters	6:35
20.	"My Eyes Don't Cry (A cappella)"		Single, track originally from Characters	6:58
21.	"My Eyes Don't Cry (Dub remix)"		Single, track originally from Characters	7:26
22.	"My Eyes Don't Cry (Bonus Beats)"		Single, track originally from Characters	3:49
23.	"My Eyes Don't Cry (12" alternate New York City hot remix)"		Single, track originally from Characters	8:47
24.	"Happy Birthday (UK 12" remix)"		Single, track originally from Hotter Than July	8:11
25.	"Keep Our Love Alive (12" remix)"		Single	4:47
26.	"Keep Our Love Alive (12" instrumental remix)"		Single	4:46
27.	"Gotta Have You (12" war vocal)"		Jungle Fever soundtrack	8:49
28.	"Gotta Have You (12" war track)"		Jungle Fever soundtrack	8:47
29.	"Fun Day (Remix)"		Jungle Fever soundtrack	6:31
30.	"Fun Day (Instrumental remix)"		Jungle Fever soundtrack	6:29
31.	"Fun Day (Club remix)"		Jungle Fever soundtrack	6:11
32.	"Fun Day (A cappella)"		Jungle Fever soundtrack	1:51
33.	"Cold Chill (Dance remix)"		Conversation Peace	6:05
34.	"Cold Chill (Live)"		Conversation Peace	7:27
35.	"Cold Chill (Prince version)" (performed by Prince)		Conversation Peace	7:23
36.	"Tomorrow Robins Will Sing (Wonder West Side "D" remix)"		Single	4:49
37.	"Tomorrow Robins Will Sing (Ronin Smooth Flavor remix)"		Single	4:05
38.	"Tomorrow Robins Will Sing (Wonder West Side vocal)"		Single	5:23
39.	"Tomorrow Robins Will Sing (Wonder West Side track)"		Single	5:24
40.	"Tomorrow Robins Will Sing (A cappella; lead vocals)"		Single	4:45
41.	"Tomorrow Robins Will Sing (Dance Hall – Mafia & Fluxy)"		Single	5:12
42.	"Tomorrow Robins Will Sing (Slojungle – Longsy D & Pinky)"		Single	5:23
43.	"Tomorrow Robins Will Sing (Wonder West Side edit short version)" (Mislabeled as "Human Rhythm mix radio edit")		Single	3:55
44.	"Tomorrow Robins Will Sing (Human Rhythm mix radio edit w/o scratch intro)"		Single	3:46
45.	"Tomorrow Robins Will Sing (Human Rhythm remix w/ scratch)"		Single	5:14
46.	"Signed, Sealed, Delivered I'm Yours (DJ Smash essential funk remix)"	Wonder; Lula Mae Hardaway; Syreeta Wright; Lee Garrett	Signed Sealed & Delivered	4:22
47.	"So What the Fuss (Remix)" (with Q-Tip)		A Time to Love	3:34
48.	"So What the Fuss (Remix w/o rap)" (with Q-Tip)		A Time to Love	4:04
49.	"So What the Fuss (Global soul remix)"		A Time to Love	4:24

== Notes to Disc 40–43 ==
- Track 1 from Switched on Blues
- Track 2 from The Motor-Town Revue, Vol. 1--Live at the Apollo
- Track 3 from Cooley High original soundtrack
- Tracks 4 & 8 from Never-Before Released Masters From Motown's Brightest Stars
- Tracks 6 & 7 from Motortown Revue, Vol. 2
- Track 9 from A Cellarful of Motown! Volume 2
- Tracks 11–13 from Motortown Revue In Paris
- Track 14 from The Motown Box
- Track 15 from Motown Sings Motown Treasures
- Track 16 from A Cellarful of Motown!
- Tracks 17 & 27 from Looking Back - Anthology
- Track 18 from Stevie Wonder's Greatest Hits
- Track 19 from Stevie Wonder's Greatest Hits Vol. 2
- Track 20 from In Loving Memory
- Tracks 21–26 from Tamla-Motown Festival Tokyo '68
- Tracks 28–30 from Motortown Revue Live
- Track 31 from The Complete Motown Anthology
- Tracks 32–34 from Motown At The Hollywood Palace
- Track 46 aired on WKNR Detroit
- Track 47 from Syreeta
- Track 48 from 7" single
- Track 49 from One to One
- Track 50 from single
- Tracks 51 & 52 released on 12" single
- Track 53 from Tug of War
- Track 54 from single
- Tracks 55 & 69 from Song Review: A Greatest Hits Collection
- Track 56 from Original Soundtrack--Berry Gordy's The Last Dragon
- Track 57 from 12" single
- Track 58 from single
- Track 59 from single
- Track 60 from single
- Track 61 from Just Between Us
- Track 62 from The Music, The Magic, The Memories of Motown: A Tribute to Berry Gordy
- Track 63 from Inner City Blues: The Music of Marvin Gaye
- Tracks 64–66 from promo CD
- Tracks 67 & 68 from Adventures of Pinnochio soundtrack
- Track 70 from 98 Degrees and Rising
- Track 71 from Ballad Collection
- Track 72 from Ballad Collection (Japan)
- Track 73 from Ballad Collection (Japan 2 CD expanded)
- Track 74 from Love and Freedom
- Tracks 75 & 76 from Original Soundtrack -- Bamboozled
- Track 77 from Voyage to India (Target exclusive version)
- Tracks 78–81 from 1977 promo single
