= Song Review: A Greatest Hits Collection =

Greatest hits album by Stevie Wonder
- Released: 1996/1998
- Genres: R&B, soul, pop
- Length: 127:59 (2CD); 78:48 (1CD)
- Label: Motown
- Producers: Stevie Wonder, Hank Cosby

Stevie Wonder chronology
Natural Wonder (1995)	Song Review: A Greatest Hits Collection (1996)	At the Close of a Century (1999)

Professional ratings
Review scores
Source	Rating
AllMusic	(1996)
AllMusic	(1998)

Song Review: A Greatest Hits Collection is a double-disc compilation album by Stevie Wonder. It was also released as a single-disc edition, which contained six tracks not featured on the 2CD release. The Australian edition has a slightly different track listing.

== Track listings ==
=== US Double-disc edition ===
Disc one

1. "Part-Time Lover" (Stevie Wonder) (7" single version) – 3:43 (From In Square Circle)
2. "I Just Called to Say I Love You" (Wonder) (Single version) – 4:21 (From the Original Motion Picture Soundtrack The Woman in Red)
3. "Superstition" (Wonder) (Single version) – 3:59 (From Talking Book)
4. "Sir Duke" (Wonder) – 3:51 (From Songs in the Key of Life)
5. "My Cherie Amour" (Henry Cosby, Wonder, Sylvia Moy) – 2:51 (From My Cherie Amour)
6. "I Was Made to Love Her" (Cosby, Lulu Mae Hardaway, Moy, Wonder) – 2:35 (From I Was Made to Love Her)
7. "Overjoyed" (Wonder) – 3:41 (From In Square Circle)
8. "Hey Love" (Clarence Paul, Morris Broadnax, Wonder) – 2:42 (From Down to Earth)
9. "Signed, Sealed, Delivered I'm Yours" (Wonder, Lee Garrett, Syreeta Wright, Hardaway) – 2:37 (From Signed, Sealed & Delivered)
10. "You Are the Sunshine of My Life" (Wonder) (Single version) – 2:54 (From Talking Book)
11. "Ribbon in the Sky" (Wonder) (Edited version) – 3:42 (From Original Musiquarium I)
12. "Master Blaster (Jammin')" (Wonder) (7" single version) – 4:49 (From Hotter than July)
13. "Living for the City" (Wonder) (Single version) – 3:41 (From Innervisions)
14. "Uptight (Everything's Alright)" (Cosby, Moy, Wonder) – 2:52 (From Up-Tight)
15. "Lately" (Wonder) – 4:04 (From Hotter than July)
16. "Do I Do" (Wonder) – 10:27 (From Original Musiquarium I)

Disc two

1. "Send One Your Love" (Stevie Wonder) – 4:01 (From Journey Through "The Secret Life of Plants")
2. "Ebony and Ivory" (Paul McCartney & Stevie Wonder) (Paul McCartney) – 3:40 (From Paul McCartney's Tug of War)
3. "All I Do" (Wonder, Paul, Broadnax) – 5:16 (From Hotter than July)
4. "That Girl" (Wonder) – 5:16 (From Original Musiquarium I)
5. "For Your Love" (Wonder) (7" single version) – 4:03 (From Conversation Peace)
6. "I Wish" (Wonder) – 4:11 (From Songs in the Key of Life)
7. "You Will Know" (Wonder) (Radio edit) – 4:00 (From Characters)
8. "Boogie On Reggae Woman" (Wonder) (Single version) – 4:06 (From Fulfillingness' First Finale)
9. "Higher Ground" (Wonder) (Single version) – 3:07 (From Innervisions)
10. "These Three Words" (Wonder) – 4:53 (From the Original Motion Picture Soundtrack Jungle Fever)
11. "Stay Gold" (Wonder, Carmine Coppola) – 3:33 (From the Original Motion Picture The Outsiders)
12. "Love Light in Flight" (Wonder) – 6:54 (From the Original Motion Picture Soundtrack The Woman in Red)
13. "Kiss Lonely Good-Bye" (Wonder) – 4:05 (Album versions appears on the Original Motion Picture Soundtrack The Adventures of Pinocchio)
14. "Hold On to Your Dream" (Wonder) – 4:19
15. "Redemption Song" (Bob Marley) – 3:46 (From the Original Motion Picture Soundtrack Get On the Bus)

=== UK double-disc edition ===
Disc one

1. "Isn't She Lovely" (Special Edit) – 3:20
2. "Uptight (Everything's Alright)" (Cosby, Moy, Wonder) – 2:52 (From Up-Tight)
3. "I Was Made to Love Her" (Cosby, Lulu Mae Hardaway, Moy, Wonder) – 2:35 (From I Was Made to Love Her)
4. "For Once in My Life" (Miller, Orlando Murden) (From For Once in My Life) – 2:48
5. "My Cherie Amour" (Henry Cosby, Wonder, Sylvia Moy) – 2:51 (From My Cherie Amour)
6. "Yester-Me, Yester-You, Yesterday" (Ron Miller, Bryan Wells) (From My Cherie Amour) – 3:05
7. "Never Had a Dream Come True" (Cosby, Moy, Wonder) – 3:12 (From Signed, Sealed & Delivered)
8. "Signed, Sealed, Delivered I'm Yours" (Wonder, Lee Garrett, Syreeta Wright, Hardaway) – 2:37 (From Signed, Sealed & Delivered)
9. "Superstition" (Wonder) (Single version) – 3:59 (From Talking Book)
10. "You Are the Sunshine of My Life" (Wonder) (Single version) – 2:54 (From Talking Book)
11. "Living for the City" (Wonder) (Single version) – 3:41 (From Innervisions)
12. "I Wish" (Wonder) – 4:11 (From Songs in the Key of Life)
13. "Sir Duke" (Wonder) – 3:51 (From Songs in the Key of Life)
14. "Master Blaster (Jammin')" (Wonder) (7" single version) – 4:49 (From Hotter than July)
15. "Happy Birthday" (Wonder) (From Hotter than July) – 5:53
16. "Ebony and Ivory" (Paul McCartney & Stevie Wonder) (Paul McCartney) – 3:40 (From Paul McCartney's Tug of War)
17. "I Just Called to Say I Love You" (Wonder) (Single version) – 4:21 (From the Original Motion Picture Soundtrack The Woman in Red)
18. "Part-Time Lover" (Stevie Wonder) (7" single version) – 3:43 (From In Square Circle)
19. "Kiss Lonely Good-Bye" (Wonder) – 4:05
20. "Redemption Song" (Bob Marley) – 3:46

Disc two

1. FREE
2. BLOWIN IN THE WIND
3. A PLACE IN THE SUN
4. I DON'T KNOW WHY
5. "Boogie On Reggae Woman" (Wonder) (Single version) – 4:06 (From Fulfillingness' First Finale)
6. "Higher Ground" (Wonder) (Single version) – 3:07 (From Innervisions)
7. I AIN'T GONNA STAND FOR IT
8. FINGERTIPS
9. HEAVEN HELP US ALL
10. PASTIME PARADISE
11. YOU HAVEN'T DONE NOTHING
12. "Send One Your Love" (Stevie Wonder) – 4:01 (From Journey Through "The Secret Life of Plants")
13. "That Girl" (Wonder) – 5:16 (From Original Musiquarium I)
14. WE CAN WORK IT OUT
15. IF YOU REALLY LOVE ME
16. "Overjoyed" (Wonder) – 3:41 (From In Square Circle)
17. "For Your Love" (Wonder) (single version) – 4:03 (From Conversation Peace)
18. "Stay Gold" (Wonder, Carmine Coppola) – 3:33 (From the Original Motion Picture The Outsiders)
19. ANOTHER STAR LIVE
20. AS

=== Single-disc edition ===
1. "Isn't She Lovely" (Stevie Wonder) (From Songs in the Key of Life) – 3:20
2. "I Just Called to Say I Love You" (Wonder) (From the Original Motion Picture Soundtrack The Woman in Red) – 4:22
3. "Superstition" (Wonder) (From Talking Book) – 4:00
4. "Sir Duke" (Wonder) (From Songs in the Key of Life) – 3:52
5. "Master Blaster (Jammin')" (Wonder) (From Hotter than July) – 4:49
6. "Ebony & Ivory" (Paul McCartney) (From Paul McCartney's Tug of War) – 3:41
7. "Happy Birthday" (Wonder) (From Hotter than July) – 5:53
8. "Living for the City" (Wonder) (From Innervisions) – 3:41
9. "He's Misstra Know-It-All" (Wonder) (From Innervisions) – 5:34
10. "You Are the Sunshine of My Life" (Wonder) (From Talking Book) – 2:56
11. "Lately" (Wonder) (From Hotter Than July) – 4:05
12. "Part-Time Lover" (Wonder) (From In Square Circle) – 3:43
13. "My Cherie Amour" (Cosby, Wonder, Moy) (From My Cherie Amour) – 2:52
14. "Yester-Me, Yester-You, Yesterday" (Ron Miller, Bryan Wells) (From My Cherie Amour) – 3:05
15. "Uptight (Everything's Alright)" (Cosby, Moy, Wonder) (From Up-Tight) – 2:53
16. "I Was Made to Love Her" (Cosby, Hardaway, Moy, Wonder) (From I Was Made to Love Her) – 2:36
17. "For Once in My Life" (Miller, Orlando Murden) (From For Once in My Life) – 2:48
18. "Signed, Sealed, Delivered I'm Yours" (Wonder, Garrett, Wright, Hardaway) (From Signed, Sealed & Delivered) – 2:39
19. "For Your Love" (Wonder) (From Conversation Peace) – 4:04
20. "Kiss Lonely Good-Bye" (Wonder) (Album versions appears on the Original Motion Picture Soundtrack The Adventures of Pinocchio) – 4:08
21. "Redemption Song" (Bob Marley) (From the Original Motion Picture Soundtrack Get On the Bus) – 3:47

=== Australian edition ===
1. "Isn't She Lovely" (Stevie Wonder) (From Songs in the Key of Life) – 3:20
2. "I Just Called to Say I Love You" (Wonder) (From the Original Motion Picture Soundtrack The Woman in Red) – 4:22
3. "Superstition" (Wonder) (From Talking Book) – 4:00
4. "Higher Ground" (Wonder) (Single version) (From Innervisions) – 3:07
5. "Boogie On Reggae Woman" (Wonder) (Single version) (From Fulfillingness' First Finale) – 4:06
6. "Master Blaster (Jammin')" (Wonder) (From Hotter than July) – 4:49
7. "Ebony & Ivory" (Paul McCartney) (From Paul McCartney's Tug of War) – 3:41
8. "Happy Birthday" (Wonder) (From Hotter than July) – 5:53
9. "Living for the City" (Wonder) (From Innervisions) – 3:41
10. "All In Love Is Fair" (Wonder) (From Innervisions) – 3:39
11. "You Are the Sunshine of My Life" (Wonder) (From Talking Book) – 2:56
12. "Lately" (Wonder) (From Hotter Than July) – 4:05
13. "Part-Time Lover" (Wonder) (From In Square Circle) – 3:43
14. "My Cherie Amour" (Cosby, Wonder, Moy) (From My Cherie Amour) – 2:52
15. "Yester-Me, Yester-You, Yesterday" (Ron Miller, Bryan Wells) (From My Cherie Amour) – 3:05
16. "Uptight (Everything's Alright)" (Cosby, Moy, Wonder) (From Up-Tight) – 2:53
17. "I Was Made to Love Her" (Cosby, Hardaway, Moy, Wonder) (From I Was Made to Love Her) – 2:36
18. "For Once in My Life" (Miller, Orlando Murden) (From For Once in My Life) – 2:48
19. "Signed, Sealed, Delivered I'm Yours" (Wonder, Garrett, Wright, Hardaway) (From Signed, Sealed & Delivered) – 2:39
20. "Kiss Lonely Good-Bye" (Wonder) (Album versions appears on the Original Motion Picture Soundtrack The Adventures of Pinocchio) – 4:08
21. "Redemption Song" (Bob Marley) (From the Original Motion Picture Soundtrack Get On the Bus) – 3:47

== Charts ==
Chart performance for Song Review: A Greatest Hits Collection
Chart (1996–1997)	Peak position
Australian Albums (ARIA)	4
Austrian Albums (Ö3 Austria)	32
Belgian Albums (Ultratop Flanders)	23
Belgian Albums (Ultratop Wallonia)	14
Dutch Albums (Album Top 100)	25
German Albums (Offizielle Top 100)	53
New Zealand Albums (RMNZ)	12
Norwegian Albums (VG-lista)	19
Swedish Albums (Sverigetopplistan)	6
Swiss Albums (Schweizer Hitparade)	15
UK Albums (Official Charts)	19
US Top R&B/Hip-Hop Albums (Billboard)	100

2007 chart performance for Song Review: A Greatest Hits Collection
Chart (2007)	Peak position
Spanish Albums (Promusicae)	44

== Certifications ==
Certifications for Song Review: A Greatest Hits Collection
Region	Certification	Certified units/sales
Argentina (CAPIF)	Platinum	60,000^{^}
Australia (ARIA)	Platinum	70,000^{^}
Japan (RIAJ)	Platinum	200,000^{^}
New Zealand (RMNZ)	Gold	7,500^{^}
Sweden (GLF)	Gold	40,000^{^}
Switzerland (IFPI Switzerland)	Gold	25,000^{^}
United Kingdom (BPI)	Platinum	300,000^{*}
United States (RIAA)	Platinum	1,000,000^{^}
Summaries
Europe (IFPI)	Platinum	1,000,000^{*}
^{*} Sales figures based on certification alone.^{^} Shipments figures based on certification alone.
