= Natural Wonder =

1995 live album by Stevie Wonder

Live album by Stevie Wonder
- Released: November 21, 1995
- Recorded: March and August 1995
- Genre: R&B
- Length: 112:18
- Label: Motown
- Producer: Stevie Wonder

Stevie Wonder chronology
Conversation Peace (1995)	Natural Wonder (1995)	Song Review: A Greatest Hits Collection (1996)

Natural Wonder is a live album by American musician Stevie Wonder, released in 1995 and recorded in Osaka, Japan and Tel Aviv, Israel. The tour featured different symphony orchestras at some venues, conducted by touring conductor Henry Panion III. It is his fourth live album after Recorded Live: The 12 Year Old Genius (1963), Stevie Wonder Live (1970), and Live at the Talk of the Town (also 1970), and his only one as a mature artist.

Professional ratings
Review scores
Source	Rating
Allmusic	link
Rolling Stone	link

== Content ==
The album comprises songs from throughout his career, spanning 1969's My Cherie Amour to 1995's Conversation Peace, in addition to the debut of three new songs – "Dancing to the Rhythm", the Stevie Ray Vaughan tribute "Stevie Ray Blues", and "Ms. & Mr. Little Ones". Wonder also performs "Stay Gold", a song he sang and co-write with composer Carmine Coppola for Coppola's score to The Outsiders (1983).

== Track listing ==
Disc one

1. "Dancing to the Rhythm" – 7:07
2. "Love's in Need of Love Today" – 6:02
3. "Master Blaster (Jammin')" – 3:36
4. "Stevie Ray Blues" – 2:27
5. "Higher Ground" – 3:59
6. "Rocket Love" – 4:47
7. "Stay Gold" – 4:21
8. "Ribbon in the Sky" – 8:37
9. "Pastime Paradise" – 3:22
10. "If It's Magic" – 3:34
11. "Ms. & Mr. Little Ones" – 4:17
12. "Village Ghetto Land" – 3:26
13. "Tomorrow Robins Will Sing" – 4:20

Disc two

1. "Overjoyed" – 3:59
2. "My Cherie Amour" – 3:20
3. "Signed, Sealed, Delivered, I'm Yours" – 2:45
4. "Living for the City" – 4:26
5. "Sir Duke" – 2:46
6. "I Wish" – 4:06
7. "You Are the Sunshine of My Life" – 2:21
8. "Superstition" – 5:37
9. "I Just Called to Say I Love You" – 4:38
10. "For Your Love" – 5:06
11. "Another Star" – 5:55

== Personnel ==
- Stevie Wonder – vocals, keyboards, grand piano, harmonica

Band

- Herman Jackson – keyboards
- Isaiah Sanders – keyboards
- Rick Zunigar – guitars
- Nathan Watts – bass, musical director
- Gerry Brown – drums
- Munyungo Jackson – percussion
- Keith John – backing vocals
- Panzie Johnson – backing vocals
- Marva King – backing vocals

Orchestra

- Tokyo Philharmonic Orchestra
- Paul Riser – orchestrations and arrangements
- Dr. Henry Panion, III – conductor
- Fredrick Charley – orchestra librarian
- Steve Torok – orchestra librarian

Production

- Stevie Wonder – producer, arrangements
- Peter Edmonds – production manager
- George Packer – production manager
- Danny Leake – recording engineer, FOH engineer
- Tohru "Kiku" Kikuchi – system engineer
- Gary Adante – editing, mixing
- Robert A. Arbittier – editing, mixing
- Chris Bellman – mastering at Bernie Grundman Mastering (Hollywood, California)
- Brian O'Neal – liner notes
- Jackie Salway – art direction, design
- James Minchin III – photography
- David Safian – photography
- Eddie Wolfl – photography
