= Live at the Talk of the Town (Stevie Wonder album) =

1970 live album by Stevie Wonder

Live album by Stevie Wonder
- Released: 1970
- Venue: Talk of the Town, London
- Genre: R&B
- Length: 53:06
- Label: Tamla (Motown)
- Producer: Norman Smith

Stevie Wonder chronology
Stevie Wonder Live (1970)	Live at the Talk of the Town (1970)	Signed, Sealed & Delivered (1970)

Professional ratings
Review scores
Source	Rating
AllMusic	3/5 stars

Live at the Talk of the Town is a 1970 live album by Stevie Wonder on the Tamla (Motown) label, recorded at the Talk of the Town nightclub in London. The third live collection by the singer-songwriter, this is the follow-up to his preceding live release Stevie Wonder Live. It was originally only released in the UK, then finally released in the US in 2005 via iTunes as part of The Complete Stevie Wonder collection.

== Track listing ==
1. "Pretty World" (Antonio Adolfo, Alan Bergman, Marilyn Bergman, Tiberio Gaspar) – 3:35
2. "Never Had a Dream Come True" (Henry Cosby, Sylvia Moy, Wonder) – 3:40
3. "Shoo-Be-Doo-Be-Doo-Da-Day" (Cosby, Moy, Wonder) – 4:52
4. "My Cherie Amour" (Cosby, Moy, Wonder) – 3:13
5. "Alfie" (Burt Bacharach, Hal David) – 2:01
6. "Drum Solo" (Wonder) – 4:23
7. "Bridge over Troubled Water" (Paul Simon) – 8:35
8. "I Was Made to Love Her" (Cosby, Lula Mae Hardaway, Moy, Wonder) – 5:29
9. "Yester-Me, Yester-You, Yesterday" (Ron Miller, Bryan Wells) – 2:55
10. "For Once in My Life" (Miller, Orlando Murden) – 3:56
11. "Signed, Sealed, Delivered I'm Yours" (Lee Garrett, Hardaway, Wonder, Syreeta Wright) – 5:22

== Personnel ==
- Stevie Wonder - vocals, clavinet, piano, harmonica, drums, bongos
- Bill Jones - guitar
- Michael Henderson - bass guitar
- Harvey Mason - drums
- Madeline Bell, P. P. Arnold, Syreeta Wright - backing vocals on "Signed, Sealed, Delivered I'm Yours"
