= Stevie Wonder Live =

1970 live album by Stevie Wonder

Live album by Stevie Wonder
- Released: March 6, 1970
- Genre: R&B
- Length: 60.37
- Label: Tamla (Motown)

Stevie Wonder chronology
My Cherie Amour (1969)	Stevie Wonder Live (1970)	Live at the Talk of the Town (1970)

Stevie Wonder Live is a 1970 live album by American musician Stevie Wonder on the Tamla (Motown) label. The second live collection by the singer-songwriter, it was released during the crossroads of Wonder's career as he was preparing to negotiate a new contract with Motown that gave him artistic control over his work.

The M.C. heard on the recording is veteran Detroit DJ Scott Regen, who can also be heard on the 1966 albums Temptations Live! and Four Tops Live!.

At 60:37 long, this was a remarkably long running time for a single LP, especially for 1970 when albums typically ran for 35–40 minutes.

== Reception ==
AllMusic said the album is "an important document of an artist in transition, performing as an interpreter rather than the songwriting genius that would eventually blossom with material like 'Superwoman', 'Superstition', and revolutionary albums such as Songs in the Key of Life".

== Track listing ==
1. "Intro/For Once in My Life/Pretty World" (Antonio Adolfo, Alan Bergman, Marilyn Bergman, Tiberio Gaspar) – 3:39
2. "Sunny" (Bobby Hebb) – 2:41
3. "Love Theme from Romeo and Juliet (A Time for Us)" (Nino Rota, Eddie Snyder, Larry Kusik) – 3:10
4. "Shoo-Be-Doo-Be-Doo-Da-Day" (Henry Cosby, Sylvia Moy, Stevie Wonder) – 5:47
5. "Everybody's Talkin'" (Fred Neil) – 2:49
6. "My Cherie Amour" (Henry Cosby, Sylvia Moy, Stevie Wonder) – 2:55
7. "Yester-Me, Yester-You, Yesterday" (Ron Miller, Bryan Wells) – 2:43
8. "I've Gotta Be Me/Once in a Lifetime" (Leslie Bricusse, Walter Marks, Anthony Newley) – 5:50
9. "A Place in the Sun" (Ron Miller, Bryan Wells) – 2:20
10. "Down to Earth" (Ron Miller, William O'Malley, Avery Vandenberg) – 2:24
11. "Blowin' in the Wind" (Bob Dylan) – 6:39
12. "By the Time I Get to Phoenix" (Jimmy Webb) – 4:00
13. "Ca' Purange" (Mussapere) – 6:45
14. "Alfie" (Burt Bacharach, Hal David) – 5:25
15. "For Once in My Life/Thank You Love" (Ron Miller, Orlando Murden/Henry Cosby, Ron Miller, Sylvia Moy, Stevie Wonder) – 3:30

== Personnel ==
- Stevie Wonder – vocals; clavinet on "Shoo-Be-Doo-Bee-Doo-Da-Day"; Italian vocals on "A Place in the Sun"; drum solo on "Ca' Purange"
- Scott Regen – M.C.

== Charts ==
Billboard Charts
Chart	Peak position	Ref
Best Selling Soul LP's	16	
Billboard Top LP's	81	
