= Songs in the Key of Life – The EP =

EP by Stevie Wonder
- Released: September 28, 2026
- Recorded: 1974–1976
- Genres: R&B; pop; progressive soul
- Length: 19:29
- Label: Motown
- Producer: Stevie Wonder

Stevie Wonder chronology
The Complete Stevie Wonder (2005)	Songs in the Key of Life – The EP (2026)

Songs in the Key of Life – The EP is an EP by American singer, songwriter and musician Stevie Wonder. Released on September 28, 2026, the 50th anniversary of Wonder's 1976 album Songs in the Key of Life, the EP compiles four unreleased outtakes from the album's extensive sessions, each of which were personally curated by Wonder.

== Release ==
The EP was surprise released on September 28, 2026, at 4:54 a.m. PDT, as a reference to the exact time in which the sessions for Songs in the Key of Life had wrapped up. Wonder commented in a press release on the same day: "We didn't add these songs to the album, but they were part of what I was feeling and discovering as we made it. They bring me back to that time in my life, and now they get to become part of yours."

== Critical reception ==
Writing for Pitchfork, Stephen Thomas Erlewine rated the album 9.0/10 and that the EP "presents four stunning outtakes".

== Track listing ==
All songs written by Stevie Wonder unless otherwise noted.

Songs in the Key of Life – The EP track listing
No.	Title	Lyrics	Length
1.	"It's Easier"		5:09
2.	"My Life Story of Love"	Stevie Wonder; Susaye Greene	3:58
3.	"I Can See the Sun in Late December"		4:37
4.	"I'm Into Livin'"		5:44
Total length:			19:29

== Personnel ==
Personnel adapted from Tidal.

"It's Easier"

- Stevie Wonder – lead vocal, background vocal, Fender Rhodes, percussion, drum machine
- Nathan Watts – bass
- Michael Sembello – electric guitar

"My Life Story of Love"

- Stevie Wonder – lead vocal, background vocal, drums
- Raymond Pounds – percussion
- Greg Phillinganes – Fender Rhodes

"I Can See the Sun in Late December"

- Stevie Wonder – lead vocal, background vocal, electric piano, drums
- Ben Bridges – acoustic guitar
- Nathan Watts – bass
- Raymond Pounds – percussion

"I'm Into Livin'"

- Stevie Wonder – lead vocal, background vocal, electric piano
- John Fischbach – drum machine
- Jim Horn – saxophone
- Deniece Williams – background vocal
- Shirley Brewer – background vocal
- Thelma Houston – background vocal
