= Heaven Help Us All =

Single by Stevie Wonder

from the album Signed, Sealed & Delivered
- B-side: "I Gotta Have a Song" "Give Your Love"
- Released: 29 September 1970
- Recorded: 1970
- Genre: Soul; pop; gospel
- Length: 3:13
- Songwriter: Ron Miller
- Producers: Ron Miller, Tom Baird

Stevie Wonder singles chronology
"Signed, Sealed, Delivered I'm Yours" (1970)	"Heaven Help Us All" (1970)	"We Can Work It Out" (1971)

"Heaven Help Us All" is a 1970 soul single composed by Ron Miller and first performed by Motown singer Stevie Wonder. The song continued Wonder's string of Top 10 singles on the pop charts reaching #9 on the Hot 100 singles chart and #2 on the R&B chart, the latter causing it to be his first runner-up since "Yester-Me, Yester-You, Yesterday". It was one of four hits Wonder scored from his Signed, Sealed & Delivered album. The song has since been covered dozens of times in a variety of styles.

== Background ==
"Heaven Help Us All" showcased a departure from Wonder's earlier works by displaying an earthier, gospel-infused sound. Cash Box reviewed the song stating that "Super Wonder surges back with another step into the total performer portrait that he has been cultivating" and that he "turns up with another all-format effort that will win across the board acceptance" and that "excellent contemporary lyric and Wonder's delivery wrap up blockbuster results." Record World called it the "top cut" from the album and said that it "is sure to deliver in a heavy way."

== Ray Charles recordings ==
Ray Charles covered the song on his 1972 album A Message from the People. He later re-recorded the song with Gladys Knight for his duets album Genius Loves Company. That album won the 2005 Grammy Award for Album of the Year, and the version of "Heaven Help Us All" won the same year for Best Gospel Performance.

== Chart history ==
Chart (1970)	Peak position
Australia (Kent Music Report)	88
Canada RPM Top Singles	14
UK Singles	29
U.S. Billboard Hot 100	9
U.S. Billboard R&B	2
U.S. Cash Box Top 100	9
