= Gotta Have You (Stevie Wonder song) =

Single by Stevie Wonder

from the album Jungle Fever (soundtrack)
- B-side: "Feeding Off the Love of the Land"
- Released: 1991
- Recorded: 1990
- Genre: Funk
- Length: 6:26 (LP version); 4:30 (radio edit)
- Label: Motown
- Songwriter: Stevie Wonder
- Producers: Stevie Wonder; Nathan Watts

Stevie Wonder singles chronology
"Keep Our Love Alive" (1990)	"Gotta Have You" (1991)	"Fun Day" (1991)

"Gotta Have You" is a song by American rhythm and blues singer Stevie Wonder, released as a single in 1991 by Motown Records. The song was the first release from the 1991 soundtrack to the film Jungle Fever. Wonder wrote the song, and co-produced it with Nathan Watts. It peaked at No. 3 on the Hot R&B Singles chart.

== Content and reception ==
James E. Perone wrote in The Sound of Stevie Wonder: His Words and Music that "it anticipates the regularly 6-minutes-plus songs of his next album, Conversation Peace" and that it "is not one of Wonder's best-remembered compositions and recordings, but it does feature a fine funky, blues-infused lead vocal melody in the verses".

In a review of the album, Stephen Thomas Erlewine of AllMusic wrote that "While the keyboard funk of 'Chemical Love,' 'Gotta Have You,' and 'Queen in the Black' doesn't sound new, it does sound alive, which is better than Wonder has sounded in years." A review in Musician was less favorable, calling it "generic, repetitive 70s-style funk". Edwin Pouncey from NME commented, "An excerpt [...] which finds him moving into a well rehearsed, but ultimately funkier groove than of late. I gave up paying attention to Stevie Wonder soon after he chose to share his piano stool with Paul McCartney, but "Gotta Have You" is a return to Talking Book form...Well, almost."

== B-side ==
The B-side, Feeding off the Love of the Land which featured in the films end credits was written during the Fulfillingness First Finale sessions but was shelved. It was updated with strings before its release.

== Track listing ==
Per Discogs.

1. "Gotta Have You" (Radio Edit) - 4:30
2. "Gotta Have You" (Album Version) - 6:26
3. "Gotta Have You" (Instrumental) - 4:48
4. "Feeding Off the Love of the Land" - 5:55

== Charts ==
Chart (1991)	Peak position
Australia (ARIA)	164
UK Dance (Music Week)	47
UK Club Chart (Record Mirror)	60
US Billboard Hot 100	92
US Hot R&B/Hip-Hop Songs (Billboard)	3
