= Syreeta (1972 album) =

Debut studio album by American singer and songwriter Syreeta Wright

Studio album by Syreeta
- Released: June 20, 1972
- Recorded: October 1971 – February 1972
- Studio: Electric Lady Studios (New York City); Crystal Industries (Los Angeles); Olympic Studios (London)
- Genre: Progressive soul
- Length: 38:32
- Label: MoWest; MW 113
- Producer: Stevie Wonder

Syreeta chronology
Syreeta (1972)	Stevie Wonder Presents: Syreeta (1974)

Singles from Syreeta
- 1. "To Know You Is To Love You" Released: July 5, 1972; 2. "I Love Every Little Thing About You" Released: September 20, 1972

Professional ratings
Review scores
Source	Rating
AllMusic	4/5 stars

Syreeta is the debut studio album by American R&B and soul singer and songwriter Syreeta Wright, released on June 20, 1972, on MoWest, a subsidiary of Motown Records.

The self-titled debut album was produced by Wright's ex-husband, frequent collaborator and musician Stevie Wonder; it was released following the couple's separation and divorce. The album featured compositions by both Wonder and Wright, and also featured Wright's takes on other artists' songs. This included a Wonder-produced, funk-oriented version of his earlier recording, "I Love Every Little Thing About You", which was initially recorded by Wonder for his Music of My Mind project, released earlier that year.

Wonder and Wright used the talk box prominently on Wright's cover of the Beatles' "She's Leaving Home" while Wright provided a smoother vocal take of Smokey Robinson's "What Love Has Joined Together". Wright wrote the ballad "Happiness" and she and Wonder co-wrote "Baby Don't You Let Me Lose This", and their featured duet "To Know You Is to Love You" together. The album failed to generate success, though Wright would go on to a productive solo career throughout the 1970s and 1980s. Wright and Wonder continued working together for several decades.

== Track listing ==
Side one

1. "I Love Every Little Thing About You" (Stevie Wonder) –4:58
2. "Black Maybe" (Wonder) –4:35
3. "Keep Him Like He Is" (Wonder, Syreeta Wright) –2:53
4. "Happiness" (Wright) –5:19

Side two

1. "She's Leaving Home" (John Lennon, Paul McCartney) –4:20
2. "What Love Has Joined Together" (Smokey Robinson, Bobby Rogers) –3:37
3. "How Many Days" (Wonder) –3:35
4. "Baby Don't You Let Me Lose This" (Wonder, Wright) –2:57
5. "To Know You Is to Love You" (Wonder, Wright) –5:18

== Personnel ==
- Syreeta Wright – lead vocals, backing vocals
- Buzzy Feiten – guitar
- Scott Gordon Edwards – bass
- Keith Copeland – drums
- Trevor Lawrence – bell tree on "Keep Him Like He Is"
- Gloria Barley, Jim Gilstrap, Lani Groves, Linda Tucker – backing vocals
- Stevie Wonder – all other instruments, vocals on "To Know You Is to Love You"
- Julian Gaillard Orchestra – strings

Technical personnel'

- Stevie Wonder, Trevor Lawrence, Yusuf Rahman – arrangements
- Robert Margouleff and Malcolm Cecil – associate producers, synthesizer programming
- Andy Edlen, Dick Shapiro, Joan DeCola – recordists
- David Weissman – art direction
- Robert Margouleff – cover photography
