= We Can Work It Out =

1965 single by the Beatles

- US picture sleeve

Single by the Beatles
- A-side: "Day Tripper" (double A-side)
- Released: 3 December 1965
- Recorded: 20 and 29 October 1965
- Studio: EMI, London
- Genre: Folk rock; pop rock
- Length: 2:15
- Label: Parlophone (UK), Capitol (US)
- Songwriter: Lennon–McCartney
- Producer: George Martin

The Beatles UK singles chronology
"Help!" (1965)	"We Can Work It Out" / "Day Tripper" (1965)	"Paperback Writer" (1966)

The Beatles US singles chronology
"Yesterday" (1965)	"We Can Work It Out" / "Day Tripper" (1965)	"Nowhere Man" (1966)

Music video
- "We Can Work It Out" on YouTube

"We Can Work It Out" is a song by the English rock band the Beatles, written by Paul McCartney and John Lennon, with uncredited arrangement assistance from George Harrison. It was first issued as a double A-side single with "Day Tripper" in December 1965. The song was recorded during the sessions for the band's Rubber Soul album. The single reached number one in Britain (where it won the Ivor Novello Award for the top-selling A-side of 1965), the United States, Australia, Canada, and Ireland. In the UK, it was the seventh highest selling single of the 1960s, and the Christmas number one of 1965.

"We Can Work It Out" is a comparatively rare example of a Lennon–McCartney collaboration from this period in the Beatles' career, in that the two songwriters worked together as they had when writing the group's early hit singles of 1963. "A Day in the Life", "Baby, You're a Rich Man", and "I've Got a Feeling", are among the other notable exceptions to this trend from the group's later career.

== Composition ==
"We Can Work It Out" sample

McCartney wrote the words and music to the verses and the chorus, with lyrics that "might have been personal", probably relating to his relationship with actress Jane Asher. McCartney then presented the song to Lennon, who contributed the bridge:

I took it to John to finish it off, and we wrote the middle together. Which is nice: 'Life is very short. There's no time for fussing and fighting, my friend.' Then it was George Harrison's idea to put the middle into 3/4 time, like a German waltz. That came on the session, it was one of the cases of the arrangement being done on the session.

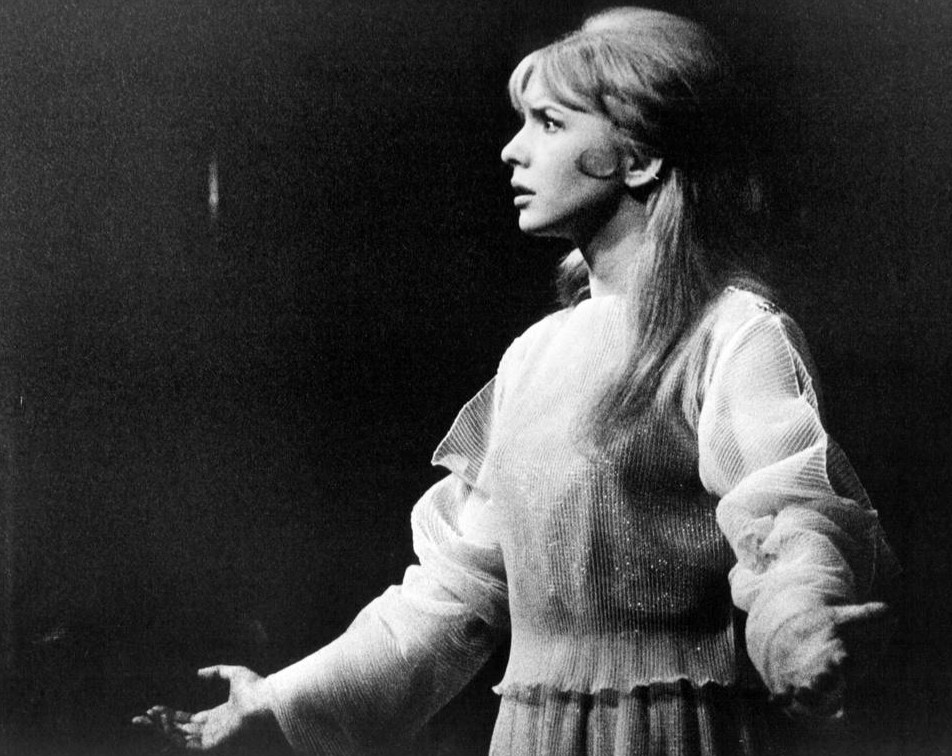
As with several of his songs over 1965–66, McCartney drew inspiration for "We Can Work It Out" from his relationship with actress Jane Asher (pictured in 1967).

With its intimations of mortality, Lennon's contribution to the twelve-bar bridge contrasts typically with what he saw as McCartney's cajoling optimism, a contrast also seen in other collaborations by the pair, such as "Getting Better" and "I've Got a Feeling". As Lennon told Playboy in 1980:

In We Can Work It Out, Paul did the first half, I did the middle eight. But you've got Paul writing, 'We can work it out / We can work it out' – real optimistic, y'know, and me, impatient: 'Life is very short, and there's no time / For fussing and fighting, my friend.'

In author Ian MacDonald's view, some critics have overemphasised the extent of McCartney's optimism in the song and neglect the urgency in passages written by McCartney, such as the line "Do I have to keep on talking till I can't go on?" Lennon's middle shifts focus from McCartney's concrete reality in D Mixolydian to a philosophical perspective in B minor. The waltz-like passage suggested by Harrison that leads back to the verse is possibly meant to suggest tiresome struggle. Rather than a formal change to 3/4 time, the waltz effect is created by the use of quarter note triplets within the regular 4/4 rhythm.

MacDonald comments on the song:

[Lennon's] passages are so suited to his Salvation Army harmonium that it's hard to imagine them not being composed on it. The swell-pedal crescendos he adds to the verses are, on the other hand, textural washes added in the studio – the first of their kind on a Beatles record and signposts to the enriched sound-palette of Revolver.

== Recording ==
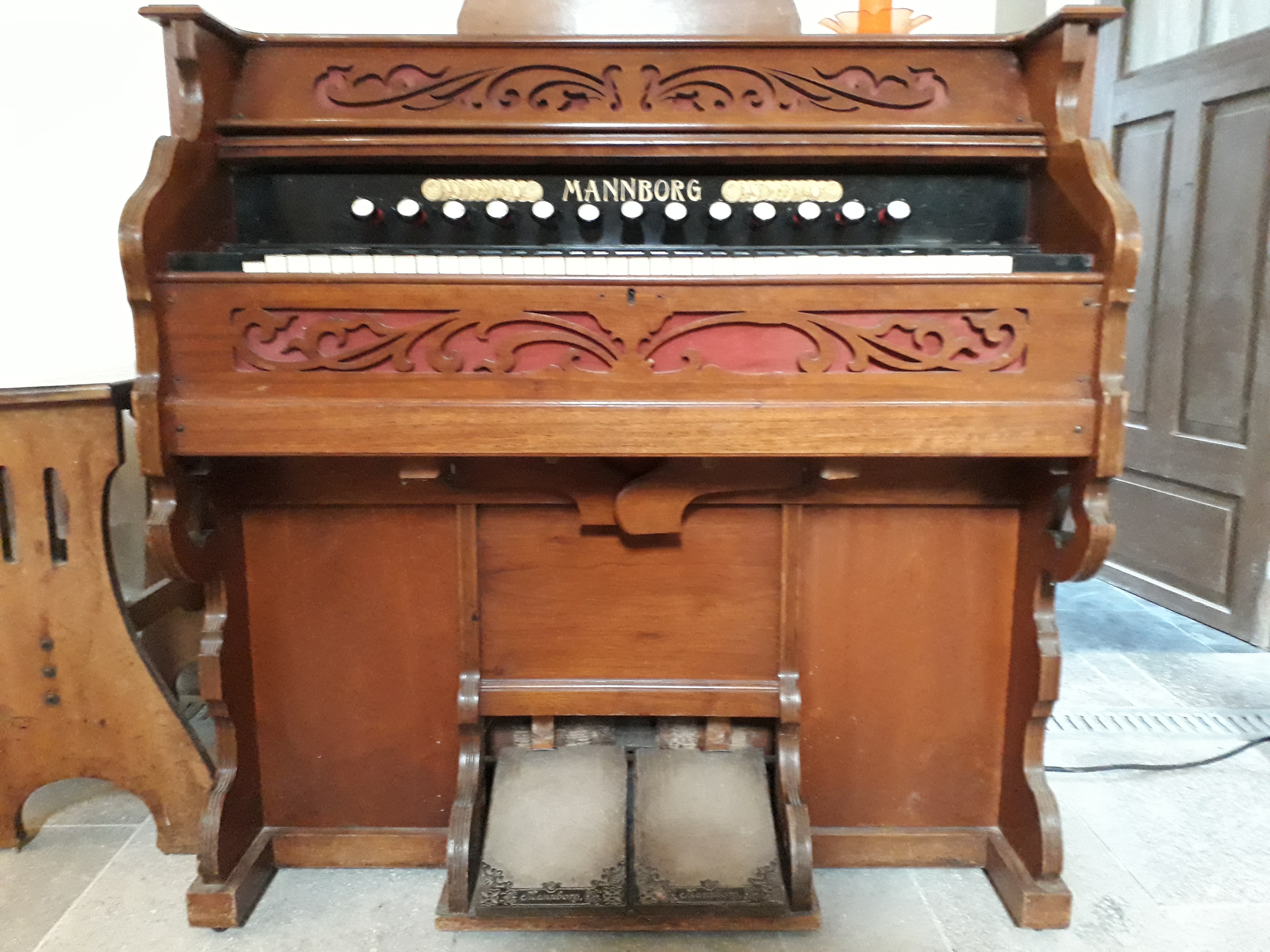
Lennon played a Mannborg harmonium on the recording.

The Beatles recorded "We Can Work It Out" at EMI Studios (later Abbey Road Studios) in London on 20 October 1965, during the sessions for their Rubber Soul album. Along with Lennon's "Day Tripper", the song was earmarked for a non-album single that would accompany the release of the new LP. The band taped a satisfactory basic track in just two takes. With nearly eleven hours dedicated to the song, however, it was by far their longest expenditure of studio time up to that point. A vocal overdubbing session took place on 29 October.

No record exists of the band members' exact contributions to the recording, leading to uncertainty regarding the playing of some of the instruments. Reduced to a single track in the final mix, where it was placed hard left in the stereo image, the group's initial performance consisted of acoustic guitar, bass, tambourine and drums. While musicologist Walter Everett credits these parts to Lennon, McCartney, Harrison and Ringo Starr, respectively, authors Jean-Michel Guesdon and Philippe Margotin suggest that McCartney, as the song's main composer, was the acoustic guitarist and Lennon instead played bass. Two harmonium parts were overdubbed, using EMI's Mannborg harmonium.

== Promotional films ==
Photo taken during the filming of the -eventually- most broadcast film

For the first time for one of their singles, the Beatles filmed promotional clips for "We Can Work It Out" and "Day Tripper". Subsequently known as the "Intertel Promos", these clips were intended as a way to save the band having to appear in person on popular British television shows such as Ready Steady Go! and Top of the Pops, and also ensured that the Beatles reached their large international audience.

Filming took place at Twickenham Studios in Twickenham, London on 23 November 1965, with Joe McGrath as director. The Beatles made a total of ten black-and-white videos that day, filming clips for the new songs as well as for their previous hit singles "I Feel Fine", "Ticket to Ride" and "Help!" (Note: Clips were made for these older songs, all of which had topped the UK charts during 1965, for inclusion in Top of the Pops' round-up of the year's biggest hits.) Three of the films were mimed performances of "We Can Work It Out", in all of which Lennon was seated at a harmonium.

The most frequently broadcast of the three was a straightforward performance piece with the group wearing black suits. In the description of Rolling Stone journalist Rob Sheffield: "At first, they're playing it all straight in their suits, until John sets out to make Paul crack up on camera. He makes it impossible for anyone else to keep a straight face – by the end, he's playing the organ with his feet." Another clip shows the group wearing the stage suits from their Shea Stadium performance on 15 August. The third clip opens with a still photograph of Lennon with a sunflower in front of his eye.

One of the November 1965 promo films was included in the Beatles' 2015 video compilation 1, and the third promo clip was included in the three-disc versions of the compilation, titled 1+.

== Release ==
In a discussion about which of the two songs should be the A-side of the new single, Lennon had argued for "Day Tripper", differing with the majority view that "We Can Work It Out" was more commercial. On 15 November, EMI announced that the A-side would be "We Can Work It Out", only for Lennon to publicly contradict this two days later. As a result, the single was marketed as a "double A-side". (Note: Some sources describe the double-A side single as "unique in Britain" and that the single constituted "the first official double A-side was released [in Britain]". The double A-side single "Evil Hearted You" / "Still I'm Sad", released in October 1965 by the Yardbirds, reached number three on the Record Retailer Chart.) Lennon's championing of "Day Tripper", for which he was the principal writer, was based on his belief that the Beatles' rock sound should be favoured over the softer style of "We Can Work It Out". Airplay and point-of-sale requests soon proved "We Can Work It Out" to be the more popular of the two sides.

The single was released on EMI's Parlophone label in Britain (as Parlophone R 5389) on 3 December 1965, the same day as Rubber Soul. The two releases coincided with speculation in the UK press that the Beatles' supremacy in the pop world since 1963 might be coming to an end, given the customary two or three years that most acts could expect to remain at the peak of their popularity. "We Can Work It Out" / "Day Tripper" entered the UK Singles Chart (at the time, the Record Retailer chart) on 15 December, at number 2, before holding the top position for five consecutive weeks. The single also failed to top the national chart published by Melody Maker in its first week – marking the first occasion since December 1963 that a new Beatles single had not immediately entered at number 1. Although the single was an immediate number 1 on the NME's chart, the Daily Mirror and Daily Express newspapers both published articles highlighting the apparent decline of the band's chart success.

The record was the Beatles' ninth consecutive chart-topping single in the UK and the band's fastest-selling single there since "Can't Buy Me Love", their previous McCartney-led A-side. For the third year in succession they had the Christmas number 1 hit. At the following year's Ivor Novello Awards, "We Can Work It Out" was acknowledged as the best-selling single of 1965, ahead of "Help!" By November 2012, it had sold 1.39 million copies in the UK, making it the group's fifth million-seller in that country. As of December 2018, the double A-side was the 54th best-selling single of all time in the UK – one of six Beatles songs included on the top sales rankings published by the Official Charts Company.

In the United States, where the single was issued by Capitol Records on 6 December (as Capitol 5555), both songs entered the Billboard Hot 100 on the week ending 18 December. Record World reviewed the single and said that "We Can Work It Out" "will fascinate teens with its change of pace 4/4-3/4 timing and potent lyric." Cash Box called the song "a rhythmic, medium-paced affair about a determined fella who is sure that he can solve his romantic problems." On 8 January 1966, "We Can Work It Out" hit number one on the chart, while "Day Tripper" entered the top ten at number 10. "We Can Work It Out" spent three non-consecutive weeks at number 1, while "Day Tripper" peaked at number 5. The song was the band's eleventh US number one, accomplished in just under two years since their debut on the Hot 100. It was their sixth consecutive number 1 single on the American charts, a record at the time. (Note: It was preceded by "I Feel Fine", "Eight Days a Week", "Ticket to Ride", "Help!" and "Yesterday".) The single was certified gold by the Recording Industry Association of America, for sales of 1 million or over, on 6 January 1966.

Author Andrew Grant Jackson writes that the Beatles' six US chart-toppers over the year from January 1965 reflected the nation's changing mood with regard to the Vietnam War and youth-driven social upheaval. With "We Can Work It Out", he continues, the Beatles conveyed the "fussing and fighting" that had replaced the post-Kennedy rebirth of optimism from the start of the year. The song was referenced by Cecil Kellaway's character in the 1967 film Guess Who's Coming to Dinner, which focused on the then-controversial issue of interracial relationships.

The Beatles performed "We Can Work It Out" on their final UK tour, which took place on 3–12 December 1965. In 1991, McCartney played an acoustic version of the song for his MTV Unplugged performance, later released on Unplugged (The Official Bootleg), and The Unplugged Collection, Volume One.

== Cover versions ==
=== Deep Purple ===
"Exposition/We Can Work It Out"

Song by Deep Purple

from the album The Book of Taliesyn
- Released: October 1968
- Genre: Progressive rock
- Length: 7:06
- Label: Harvest
- Songwriters: Beethoven; Ritchie Blackmore; Nick Simper; Jon Lord; Ian Paice; Lennon–McCartney
- Producer: Derek Lawrence

Deep Purple covered "We Can Work It Out" on their 1968 album The Book of Taliesyn. The band drastically reworked it, as they always did with covers. The first three minutes of the song is a fast progressive rock instrumental incorporating themes from classical music (notably Tchaikovsky's Romeo and Juliet) called "Exposition", which drifts over into the Beatles song.

Deep Purple had followed the same structure on their covers on their debut album, Shades of Deep Purple, such as the Leaves' "Hey Joe". Reportedly, the band recorded their version of the song because McCartney had stated that he was impressed with their cover of "Help!".

=== Stevie Wonder ===
"We Can Work It Out"

Single by Stevie Wonder

from the album Signed, Sealed & Delivered
- B-side: "Never Dreamed You'd Leave in Summer"
- Released: March 1971
- Genre: Funk; soul
- Length: 3:19
- Label: Tamla
- Songwriter: Lennon–McCartney
- Producer: Stevie Wonder

Stevie Wonder singles chronology
"Heaven Help Us All" (1970)	"We Can Work It Out" (1971)	"If You Really Love Me" (1971)

In 1970, Stevie Wonder covered the song on his album Signed, Sealed & Delivered, and released it as a single in 1971. The single reached number 13 on the Billboard Hot 100. Wonder's version earned him his fifth Grammy Award nomination in 1972, for Best Male R&B Vocal Performance. Cash Box described this version as a "spectacular dance track" which "returns Wonder to his earlier straight-ahead teen self complete with harmonica solo."

Wonder performed the song for McCartney when the latter was presented with a Grammy Lifetime Achievement Award in 1990. In 2010, when McCartney was awarded the Gershwin Prize by the Library of Congress, Wonder again performed his arrangement of "We Can Work It Out" at a White House ceremony held in McCartney's honour. Wonder performed it a third time in January 2014, at the 50th anniversary tribute of the Beatles' first appearance on The Ed Sullivan Show.

=== Other artists ===
In his discussion of the various cover versions of "We Can Work It Out", John Kruth describes Petula Clark's recording, released on her 1966 album My Love, as "too perky for its own good". He highlights Humble Pie's blues version, from their 1975 album Street Rats, as a "bold" reading in which the band dispensed with the song's melody to fashion "a worried blues ... more Sonny Boy Williamson than Fab Four".

In 1976, the song was the Four Seasons' contribution to the soundtrack of All This and World War II, a musical documentary that author Nicholas Schaffner described as "the most bizarre" of several film and television works that capitalised on EMI, now free of its contractual obligations to the Beatles, flooding the market with re-packaged Beatles singles. (Note: As a result of this sales campaign, "Day Tripper" / "We Can Work It Out", along with all the other 21 singles released by the Beatles between 1962 and 1970, re-entered the top 100 in the UK.) Schaffner included this heavily orchestrated version, produced by Lou Reizner, among the interpretations that "[succeed] in making Lennon–McCartney's greatest songs sound, at best, like the Beatles' rendition of 'Good Night'".

Other artists who have covered the song include Dionne Warwick, Valerie Simpson, Melanie, Chaka Khan (on the album What Cha' Gonna Do for Me), Maxine Brown, Brass Construction, King Missile, Johnny Mathis, Judy Collins, Big Youth, Tesla, Plain White T's, Tom Jones, Heather Nova, Steel Pulse, and Rick Wakeman.

== Personnel ==
According to Walter Everett, the line-up of musicians on the Beatles' recording was as follows:

- Paul McCartney – double-tracked lead vocal, bass guitar
- John Lennon – harmony vocal, acoustic guitar, harmonium
- George Harrison – tambourine
- Ringo Starr – drums

In his personnel list for the song, MacDonald notes that some sources attribute the tambourine part to Harrison, yet he considers it more likely that Starr played the instrument. Everett credits Harrison, citing the tambourine's placement in the stereo image with the three other instruments recorded as part of the basic track. Guesdon and Margotin also credit Harrison.

== Charts and certifications ==
=== Beatles version ===
Weekly charts

Chart (1965–66)	Peak position
Australian Kent Music Report	1
Belgium (Ultratop 50 Flanders)	3
Canada Top Singles (RPM)	1
Finnish Suomen Virallinen Lista	1
Irish Singles Chart	1
Italian Musica e Dischi Chart	5
Netherlands (Single Top 100)	1
New Zealand Lever Hit Parade	1
Rhodesian Lyons Maid Chart	1
South African Springbok Radio	2
Swedish Kvällstoppen Chart	1
Swedish Tio i Topp Chart	1
UK Record Retailer Chart	1
US Billboard Hot 100	1
US Cash Box Top 100	1
West German Musikmarkt Hit-Parade	2

Year-end charts

Chart (1966)	Rank
US Billboard Year-End	16
US Cash Box	11

Certifications

Region	Certification	Certified units/sales
United States (RIAA)	Gold	1,000,000^{^}
^{^} Shipments figures based on certification alone.

=== Stevie Wonder version ===
Weekly charts

Chart (1971)	Peak position
Canadian RPM 100	49
UK Singles Chart	27
US Billboard Hot 100	13
US Billboard Best Selling Soul Singles	3
US Cash Box Top 100	9

Year-end charts

Chart (1971)	Rank
US Cash Box	96
US R&B/Soul (Billboard)	27

== Sources ==
- Badman, Keith (2001). The Beatles Diary Volume 2: After the Break-Up 1970–2001. London: Omnibus Press. ISBN 978-0-7119-8307-6.
- Bronson, Fred (2003). The Billboard Book of Number One Hits (5th ed.). Billboard Books. ISBN 0823076776.
- Castleman, Harry; Podrazik, Walter J. (1976). All Together Now: The First Complete Beatles Discography 1961–1975. New York, NY: Ballantine Books. ISBN 0-345-25680-8.
- Everett, Walter (2001). The Beatles as Musicians: The Quarry Men through Rubber Soul. New York, NY: Oxford University Press. ISBN 0-19-514105-9.
- Guesdon, Jean-Michel; Margotin, Philippe (2013). All the Songs: The Story Behind Every Beatles Release. New York, NY: Black Dog & Leventhal. ISBN 978-1-57912-952-1.
- Hertsgaard, Mark (1995). A Day in the Life: The Music and Artistry of the Beatles. New York: Delacorte Press. ISBN 0-385-31377-2.
- Jackson, Andrew Grant (2015). 1965: The Most Revolutionary Year in Music. New York, NY: Thomas Dunne Books. ISBN 978-1-250-05962-8.
- Kruth, John (2015). This Bird Has Flown: The Enduring Beauty of Rubber Soul Fifty Years On. Milwaukee, WI: Backbeat Books. ISBN 978-1-61713-573-6.
- Lewisohn, Mark (2005) [1988]. The Complete Beatles Recording Sessions: The Official Story of the Abbey Road Years 1962–1970. London: Bounty Books. ISBN 978-0-7537-2545-0.
- MacDonald, Ian (2005). Revolution in the Head: The Beatles' Records and the Sixties (2nd rev. edn). Chicago, IL: Chicago Review Press. ISBN 978-1-55652-733-3.
- Miles, Barry (1997). Paul McCartney: Many Years From Now. New York: Henry Holt and Company. ISBN 0-8050-5249-6.
- Miles, Barry (2001). The Beatles Diary Volume 1: The Beatles Years. London: Omnibus Press. ISBN 0-7119-8308-9.
- "Number 1s Index". everyHit.com. 2009.
- Pieper, Jörg (2017). The Solo Beatles Film & TV Chronicle 1971–1980 [including The Beatles Film & TV Chronicle Updates 1961–1970]. lulu.com. ISBN 978-1-4092-8301-0.
- Rodriguez, Robert (2010). Fab Four FAQ 2.0: The Beatles' Solo Years, 1970–1980. Milwaukee, WI: Backbeat Books. ISBN 978-1-4165-9093-4.
- Rodriguez, Robert (2012). Revolver: How the Beatles Reimagined Rock 'n' Roll. Milwaukee, WI: Backbeat Books. ISBN 978-1-61713-009-0.
- Russo, Greg (October 2016). Yardbirds: The Ultimate Rave-Up (6th ed.). West Caldwell, New Jersey: Crossfire Publications. ISBN 978-0-9791845-7-4.
- Schaffner, Nicholas (1978). The Beatles Forever. New York, NY: McGraw-Hill. ISBN 0-07-055087-5.
- Sheff, David (2000). All We Are Saying: The Last Major Interview with John Lennon and Yoko Ono. New York: St. Martin's Press. ISBN 0-312-25464-4.
- Turner, Steve (2016). Beatles '66: The Revolutionary Year. New York, NY: HarperLuxe. ISBN 978-0-06-249713-0.
- Wallgren, Mark (1982). The Beatles on Record. New York: Simon & Schuster. ISBN 0-671-45682-2.
- Winn, John C. (2008). Way Beyond Compare: The Beatles' Recorded Legacy, Volume One, 1962–1965. New York, NY: Three Rivers Press. ISBN 978-0-307-45239-9.
- Womack, Kenneth (2014). The Beatles Encyclopedia: Everything Fab Four. Santa Barbara, CA: ABC-CLIO. ISBN 978-0-313-39171-2.
