= Jungle Fever (soundtrack) =

Soundtrack album by Stevie Wonder
- Released: May 28, 1991
- Genre: R&B
- Length: 51:06
- Label: Motown
- Producers: Stevie Wonder, Nathan Watts

Stevie Wonder chronology
Characters (1987)	Jungle Fever (1991)	Conversation Peace (1995)

Singles from Jungle Fever
- 1. "Gotta Have You" Released: May 1991; 2. "Fun Day" Released: June 1991; 3. "These Three Words" Released: September 1991

Jungle Fever is a soundtrack album by American R&B singer-songwriter, producer, and multi-instrumentalist Stevie Wonder, recorded for the film Jungle Fever. It was released by the Motown label on May 28, 1991.

Three hit singles were released from the soundtrack: the first and most successful single was "Gotta Have You" (Hot 100 No. 92, R&B No. 3), the second single was "Fun Day" (R&B No. 6, UK No. 63), and the final single was "These Three Words" (R&B No. 7).

== Commercial performance ==
Jungle Fever became Wonder's ninth album, and fifth in a row, to reach number-one on the Billboard R&B Albums. The album debuted at number 91 on the Billboard 200. After five weeks, Jungle Fever peaked at number 24 on Billboard 200. It was certified gold by the Recording Industry Association of America on July 10, 1991.

== Critical reception ==
Professional ratings
Review scores
Source	Rating
AllMusic	3/5 stars
Calgary Herald	B−
Chicago Tribune	3/4 stars
Christgau's Consumer Guide	(3-star Honorable Mention)
Entertainment Weekly	C
NME	3/10
Q	4/5 stars
Rolling Stone	3.5/5 stars
The Rolling Stone Album Guide	3.5/5 stars

Jungle Fever received lukewarm reviews from critics. Reviewing for Entertainment Weekly in 1991, Bill Wyman said the album lacks worthwhile hooks and lyrics and that Wonder's style of arrangement sounds "more and more dated as the years go by". In a positive review, Rolling Stone magazine called Jungle Fever a "welcome return to form" and said that Wonder has not "sounded so freewheeling, confident and engaging" since his 1980 album Hotter Than July. The Chicago Tribune wrote that it is "as direct and consistently tuneful as anything he has done in recent years". Robert Christgau of The Village Voice cited "Fun Day" and the title track as highlights and referred to Wonder as "a genius even if that's what he's selling".

In a retrospective review for AllMusic, Stephen Thomas Erlewine cited Jungle Fever as "Wonder's best work in years ... a considerable improvement from his bland late-'80s albums", although he said Wonder can be too sentimental on ballads such as "These Three Words". J. D. Considine wrote in The Rolling Stone Album Guide (2004) that it is "lightweight but likeable". In his 2000 Consumer Guide book, Christgau gave the album a three-star honorable mention, which indicated "an enjoyable effort consumers attuned to its overriding aesthetic or individual vision may well treasure".

== Track listing ==
All songs written by Stevie Wonder, except "Chemical Love", lyrics by Stephanie Andrews.

1. "Fun Day" – 4:41
2. "Queen in the Black" – 4:46
3. "These Three Words" – 4:54
4. "Each Other's Throat" – 4:17
5. "If She Breaks Your Heart" (sung by Kimberly Brewer) – 5:03
6. "Gotta Have You" – 6:26
7. "Make Sure You're Sure" – 3:30
8. "Jungle Fever" – 4:55
9. "I Go Sailing" – 3:58
10. "Chemical Love" – 4:26
11. "Lighting Up the Candles" – 4:09

== Personnel ==
Credits adapted from album's liner notes.

Musicians

- Stevie Wonder — lead vocals (all tracks), backing vocals (1, 2, 5, 9–11), backing vocal arrangements (1–6, 8–11), piano (1, 3, 6, 7, 11), drums and percussion (1, 2, 4–6, 8–11), synth bass (2, 4–10), synth guitar (4, 6, 8–10), synth horns (2, 4, 6, 8, 11), electric piano (1, 5, 9), synth strings (2, 5, 10), harmonica (1, 11), synth harp (2, 11), synth organ (4, 6), synth voice (9, 10), bass (1), synth flute (5)
- John Aceuedo — strings (track 7)
- Sikir’u Bimbo Adepoju — additional drums and additional percussion (track 8)
- Robert Becker — strings (track 7)
- Alvino Bennett — drums (tracks 3, 7)
- Kimberly Brewer — lead vocals and backing vocal arrangements (track 5), backing vocals (3–6, 9)
- Boyz II Men — backing vocals (track 8)
- Shirley Brewer — backing vocals (track 9)
- Bridgette Bryant — backing vocals (tracks 3, 4, 6)
- Lenny Castro — additional drums and additional percussion (track 8)
- Larry Corbett — strings (track 7)
- Earl DeRouen — additional drums and additional percussion (track 8)
- Jacquelyn Farris — backing vocals (track 9)
- Lynn Fiddmont-Linsey — backing vocals (tracks 3, 4, 6)
- Nancy Fields — backing vocals (track 8)
- Pamela Gates Henderson — strings (track 7)
- Jon Gibson — backing vocals (track 9)
- Susan Gikaru — backing vocals (track 8)
- Larry Gittens — trumpet (track 5)
- Vaughn Halyard — percussion (track 6)
- Dorian Holley — backing vocals (tracks 1, 2)
- Norman Hughes — strings (track 7)
- Sylvester Irungu — backing vocals (track 8)
- Keith John — backing vocals (tracks 1–4, 6, 9), backing vocal arrangements (8)
- Peter Kent — strings (track 7)
- Amy Keys — backing vocals (track 9)
- Rose Kimani — backing vocals (track 8)
- Faith Kinyua — backing vocals (track 8)
- Linda Kinyua — backing vocals (track 8)
- Winnie Kuria — backing vocals (track 8)
- Maysa Leak — backing vocals (tracks 3, 9)
- Catherine Likimani — backing vocals (track 8)
- Samson Malelu — backing vocals (track 8)
- Nancy K. Masaki-Hathaway — strings (track 7)
- Norah Mbusi — backing vocals (track 8)
- Munyungo — additional drums and additional percussion (track 8)
- Babatunde Olatunji — additional drums and additional percussion (track 8)
- Sid Page — concertmaster and contractor (track 7)
- Kelly Parkinson — strings (track 7)
- Darryl Phinnessee — backing vocals (tracks 3, 4, 6)
- Vladimir Polimatio — strings (track 7)
- Greg Poreé — guitar (track 3), strings and conductor (7)
- Irene Prabhudas — backing vocals (track 8)
- Sekou Rubadiri — backing vocals (track 8)
- Isaiah Sanders — synthesizer (track 3)
- Daniel Smith — strings (track 7)
- Jane Tameno — backing vocals (track 8)
- Mary Tameno — backing vocals (track 8)
- Grace Thande — backing vocals (track 8)
- Chris Thiongo — backing vocals (track 8)
- Keith Washington — backing vocals (track 2)
- Nathan Watts — bass (track 3), percussion (6), backing vocal arrangements (8)
- Fred White — backing vocals (track 8)
- Arthur Williams III — backing vocals (track 8)
- Phillip Williams — backing vocals (tracks 1, 2)
- Herschel Wise — strings (track 7)
- Steve Wise — backing vocals (tracks 1, 2)
- Syreeta Wright — backing vocals (track 9)

Production

- Stevie Wonder — producer and arranger
- Steve VanArden — engineer and mixing
- Jim Shelton — mastering
- Vaughn Halyard — associate producer, computer sound design
- Nathan Watts — co-associate producer
- Keith John — production assistant
- Malcolm Cecil — additional engineering and additional programming

== Charts ==
=== Weekly charts ===
Chart (1991)	Peak position
Australian Albums (ARIA Charts)	109
Dutch Albums (Album Top 100)	52
Swedish Albums (Sverigetopplistan)	33
UK Albums (Official Charts)	56
US Billboard 200	24
US Top R&B/Hip-Hop Albums (Billboard)	1

=== Year-end charts ===
Chart (1991)	Position
US Top R&B/Hip-Hop Albums (Billboard)	32

== Certifications ==
Region	Certification	Certified units/sales
United States (RIAA)	Gold	500,000^{^}
^{^} Shipments figures based on certification alone.

== See also ==
- List of number-one R&B albums of 1991 (U.S.)
