= Signed, Sealed & Delivered (album) =

1970 studio album by Stevie Wonder

Studio album by Stevie Wonder
- Released: August 7, 1970
- Studio: Hitsville U.S.A., Detroit, Michigan
- Genre: Soul
- Length: 35:32
- Label: Tamla
- Producer: Stevie Wonder; Henry Cosby; Ron Miller

Stevie Wonder chronology
Live at the Talk of the Town (1970)	Signed, Sealed & Delivered (1970)	Where I'm Coming From (1971)

Singles from Signed, Sealed & Delivered
- 1. "Never Had a Dream Come True" Released: February 7, 1970; 2. "Signed, Sealed, Delivered I'm Yours" Released: June 3, 1970; 3. "Heaven Help Us All" Released: September 29, 1970; 4. "We Can Work It Out" Released: February 18, 1971

Signed, Sealed & Delivered is the twelfth studio album by American recording artist Stevie Wonder, released on August 7, 1970, by Tamla Records. The album featured four singles that reached the Billboard Hot 100: "Signed, Sealed, Delivered I'm Yours" (No. 3), "Heaven Help Us All" (No. 9), "Never Had a Dream Come True" (No. 26), and Wonder's cover of the Beatles' "We Can Work It Out" (No. 13). The album peaked at No. 25 on the Billboard Top LPs chart and No. 7 on the R&B Albums chart.

Though his name had appeared in a shared production capacity on the 1968 album For Once in My Life, this was the first album on which Wonder was heavily spotlighted for his producer role, personally producing two of the tracks and co-producing three others. He also co-wrote seven of the album's twelve songs.

== Critical reception ==
Professional ratings
Review scores
Source	Rating
AllMusic	3/5 stars
Christgau's Record Guide	B+

Reviewing for The Village Voice in 1970, Robert Christgau said Signed, Sealed & Delivered has flawed moments, but Motown albums are rarely consistent. He concluded the album is "still the most exciting LP by a male soul singer in a very long time, and it slips into no mold, Motown's included." Rolling Stone magazine's Vince Aletti said that the album "holds more creative singing than you're likely to find in another performer's entire body of work." Aletti felt that, although not all of the songs match the energy of the title track, the album does not have a bad song and includes an "extraordinary" cover of "We Can Work It Out" that shares the other songs' "tasteful, unencumbered" arrangements.

In his list for The Village Voice, Christgau named Signed, Sealed and Delivered the eleventh best album of 1970, and later called it the best soul album of the year. In a retrospective review, Allmusic's Ron Wynn gave the album three out of five stars, noting that Wonder's focus seemed to be more on social issues than commercial concerns, and found songs such as "I Can't Let My Heaven Walk Away" and "Never Had a Dream Come True" as intriguing as the hit title track and "We Can Work It Out".

== Track listing ==
Side one

1. "Never Had a Dream Come True" (Stevie Wonder, Henry Cosby, Sylvia Moy) – 3:13
2. "We Can Work It Out" (John Lennon, Paul McCartney) – 3:19
3. "Signed, Sealed, Delivered I'm Yours" (Lee Garrett, Lula Mae Hardaway, Wonder, Syreeta Wright) – 2:41
4. "Heaven Help Us All" (Ron Miller) – 3:13
5. "You Can't Judge a Book by Its Cover" (Cosby, Pam Sawyer, Wonder) – 2:32
6. "Sugar" (Don Hunter, Wonder) – 2:52

Side two

1. "Don't Wonder Why" (Leonard Caston) – 4:54
2. "Anything You Want Me To Do" (Hunter, Hardaway, Paul Riser, Wonder) – 2:19
3. "I Can't Let My Heaven Walk Away" (Joe Hinton, Sawyer) – 2:53
4. "Joy (Takes Over Me)" (Duke Browner) – 2:12
5. "I Gotta Have a Song" (Hunter, Hardaway, Riser, Wonder) – 2:32
6. "Something to Say" (Hunter, Wonder) – 3:26

== Personnel ==
- Stevie Wonder – lead vocals, backing vocals (side 1, tracks 1, 2, and 6; side 2, tracks 2–5), harmonica, drums, percussion, piano, organ, clavinet
- The Andantes – backing vocals (side 2, tracks 1, 3, and 4)
- The Third Generation (Lynda Laurence, Venetta Fields, and Syreeta Wright) – backing vocals (side 1, tracks 3 and 5)
- The Originals – backing vocals (side 2, track 1)
- James Jamerson – bass
- Bob Babbitt – bass (side 1, tracks 2 and 3)
- Dennis Coffey – guitar
- Eddie Willis – sitar (side 1, track 3)
- Richard "Pistol" Allen – drums
- The Funk Brothers – all other instruments
- Track 1 produced by Henry Cosby
- Tracks 2, 3 produced by Stevie Wonder
- Track 4 produced by Ron Miller and Tom Baird
- Track 11 produced by Don Hunter and Stevie Wonder
