= To Know You Is to Love You (song) =

Single by B.B. King

from the album To Know You Is to Love You
- B-side: "I Can't Leave"
- Released: June 1973
- Recorded: 1973
- Genre: R&B, soul blues
- Length: 3:54 (single version); 8:35 (album version)
- Label: ABC
- Songwriter(s): Syreeta Wright, Stevie Wonder
- Producer(s): Dave Crawford

B.B. King singles chronology
"Summer in the City" (1972)	"To Know You Is to Love You" (1973)	"I Like to Live the Love" (1973)

Official audio
- "To Know You Is to Love You" (album version) on YouTube

"To Know You Is to Love You" is a song written by Syreeta Wright and Stevie Wonder in 1972.

== Recording history ==
In June 1972, the song came out as a duet on Syreeta Wright's debut album (Syreeta, MW 113) by MoWest Records (a Motown company).

In 1973, the song came out as both a single and an album by B.B. King, released by ABC Records in 1973, with the title song co-interpreted with Stevie Wonder (track B1 on the album To Know You Is to Love You). In the US, this version went to #12 on the Hot Soul Singles chart and #38 on the Hot 100.

Other recordings include:

- 1974: American R&B, soul and gospel singer Margie Joseph
- 1974: Scottish folk rock band String Driven Thing
- 1975: Thelma Houston and Pressure Cooker, I've Got the Music in Me
- 1975: South African-born British pop singer Danny Williams
- 1977: American jazz, blues, and R&B singer Joe Bourne
- 1979: Norwegian band Baracudaz
- 1998: American blues singer Jake Jewell
- 2021: American children's blues band The Cat and the Owl (instrumental)
