= My Cherie Amour (album) =

1969 studio album by Stevie Wonder

Studio album by Stevie Wonder
- Released: August 29, 1969
- Recorded: 1969 ("My Cherie Amour" recorded in 1967–68)
- Studios: Hitsville U.S.A., Detroit, Michigan
- Genres: Pop soul, R&B
- Length: 35:00
- Label: Tamla
- Producer: Henry Cosby

Stevie Wonder chronology
For Once In My Life (1968)	My Cherie Amour (1969)	Stevie Wonder Live (1970)

Singles from My Cherie Amour
- 1. "My Cherie Amour" Released: January 28, 1969; 2. "Yester-Me, Yester-You, Yesterday" Released: September 30, 1969

Professional ratings
Review scores
Source	Rating
AllMusic	3/5 stars
Rolling Stone	favorable

My Cherie Amour is the eleventh album by American singer-songwriter Stevie Wonder released on the Tamla (Motown) label on August 29, 1969, his eleventh studio album. The album yielded a pair of top 10 hits in the Billboard Hot 100, including the title track (No. 4) and "Yester-Me, Yester-You, Yesterday" (No. 7), as well as Wonder's takes on the 1967 hit "Light My Fire" by The Doors, "Hello, Young Lovers" from The King and I and "The Shadow of Your Smile" from the 1965 film The Sandpiper. It reached No. 12 in the UK albums chart and No. 34 in the US pop albums chart.

== Track listing ==
Side one

1. "My Cherie Amour" (Henry Cosby, Sylvia Moy, Stevie Wonder) – 2:49
2. "Hello, Young Lovers" (Oscar Hammerstein, Richard Rodgers) – 3:09
3. "At Last" (Mack Gordon, Harry Warren) – 2:44
4. "Light My Fire" (John Densmore, Robby Krieger, Ray Manzarek, Jim Morrison) – 3:34
5. "The Shadow of Your Smile" (Johnny Mandel, Paul Francis Webster) – 2:38
6. "You and Me" (Beatrice Verdi, Deke Richards) – 2:41

Side two

1. "Pearl" (Richard Morris) – 2:42
2. "Somebody Knows, Somebody Cares" (Cosby, Moy, Lula Mae Hardaway, Wonder) – 2:30
3. "Yester-Me, Yester-You, Yesterday" (Ron Miller, Bryan Wells) – 3:01
4. "Angie Girl" (Cosby, Moy, Wonder) – 2:57
5. "Give Your Love" (Cosby, Don Hunter, Wonder) – 3:42
6. "I've Got You" (Moy, Wonder) – 2:33

== Personnel ==
- Stevie Wonder – harmonica, keyboards, vocals
- James Jamerson – bass
- Benny Benjamin – drums
- Henry Cosby – producer
