= Conversation Peace =

1995 studio album by Stevie Wonder

Studio album by Stevie Wonder
- Released: March 21, 1995
- Recorded: 1993–1995
- Genre: R&B
- Length: 73:32
- Label: Motown
- Producer: Stevie Wonder

Stevie Wonder chronology
Jungle Fever (1991)	Conversation Peace (1995)	Natural Wonder (1995)

Singles from Conversation Peace
- 1. "For Your Love" Released: February 1995; 2. "Tomorrow Robins Will Sing" Released: April 1995; 3. "Treat Myself" Released: July 1995

Conversation Peace is the twenty-second studio album by American singer, songwriter and musician Stevie Wonder, released on March 21, 1995, by Motown Records. The album was Wonder's first full-length non-soundtrack studio album since 1987's Characters. It yielded the hits "For Your Love" (a Grammy winner for Wonder for Best R&B Male Vocal Performance) and the reggae-flavored "Tomorrow Robins Will Sing". Conversation Peace also saw Wonder reuniting with Robert Margouleff, who assisted during Wonder's "classic period" from 1972 to 1974.

Wonder wrote about 40 songs in 1993 after being invited to stay for six weeks in Ghana by President Jerry John Rawlings. A number of these songs were eventually shaped into album form. Motown announced in August 1993 that Conversation Peace would be released later that year; however, Wonder continued to work on the album through 1994 until its release in March 1995, when Vibe magazine reported that the album had been in development "off and on for at least the past four" years. A circulating outtake from these sessions, "Ms and Mr Little Ones", was later released on Natural Wonder (1995).

== Reception ==
Professional ratings
Review scores
Source	Rating
AllMusic	2.5/5 stars
Chicago Tribune	2.5/5 stars
Entertainment Weekly	B−
Los Angeles Times	2/5 stars
NME	7/10
The New York Times	(favorable)
Rolling Stone	4/5 stars
Select	2/5 medals
Stereo Review	(favorable)
The Village Voice	A

Critics felt that the album was a return to Wonder's classic period of the 1970s. John Milward in a 1995 review in Rolling Stone gave it four stars and felt that while the album is "reminiscent" of Wonder's classic albums, its "lean execution" gives it a "modern sound". While the quality of the work was appreciated, Greg Kot of the Chicago Tribune and Jean Rosenbluth of the Los Angeles Times felt that the style was a bit too familiar and well-worn to be interesting, though Robert Christgau of The Village Voice gave it an "A−" and remarked that while listeners may have "heard all this before, that doesn't mean it's worn out its welcome." Stephen Thomas Erlewine gave it two-and-a-half stars in a retrospective review for AllMusic and felt the music was not contemporary enough to get radio play.

== Commercial performance ==
Conversation Peace debuted at number 16 on the US Billboard 200, selling 53,000 copies in its first week. It was certified gold by the Recording Industry Association of America on June 14, 1995.

As of October 2005, the album had sales 361,000 copies in the United States according to Nielsen SoundScan.

== Track listing ==
All tracks written by Stevie Wonder, except where noted.

No.	Title	Writer(s)	Length
1.	"Rain Your Love Down"		6:08
2.	"Edge of Eternity"		6:04
3.	"Taboo to Love"		4:25
4.	"Take the Time Out"		5:05
5.	"I'm New"		5:41
6.	"My Love Is with You"		5:54
7.	"Treat Myself"	Wonder; Stephanie Andrews	4:55
8.	"Tomorrow Robins Will Sing"	Wonder; Edley Shine	4:46
9.	"Sensuous Whisper"		5:47
10.	"For Your Love"		5:00
11.	"Cold Chill"		6:53
12.	"Sorry"		6:15
13.	"Conversation Peace"		6:39

== Personnel ==
Adapted from the album's liner notes.

=== Musicians ===
- Stevie Wonder – vocals (all tracks), backing vocals (tracks 1–3, 7, 8, 10), backing vocal co-arrangement (track 7), lead vocal harmony (track 11), multi-instruments (tracks 1, 2, 4–13), keyboard guitar (track 3), string arrangement (track 3)
- Stephanie Andrews – background "uh" (track 9)
- Jorge Arciniega – trumpet (track 2)
- Anita Baker – backing vocals (track 9)
- Gary Bias – alto saxophone (track 2)
- Terence Blanchard – trumpet (track 9)
- Kimberly Brewer – backing vocals (tracks 2, 6, 11)
- Ben Bridges – guitar solo (track 11)
- Ollie Brown – conductor (track 6)
- Ray Brown – tenor saxophone (track 2)
- Ronald Brown – trumpet (track 2)
- Akosua Busia – president/organizer (track 6)
- Lenny Castro – percussion (track 2)
- The Christian Entertainer's Fellowship – "Ban the hand gun" chant (track 6)
- Daryl Coley – backing vocals (track 6)
- Julie Delgado – backing vocals (track 12)
- Ernie Fields, Jr. – tenor saxophone (track 2)
- For Real – backing vocals (track 8)
- Katrina Harper – backing vocals (track 12)
- Kenneth Lee Harris – backing vocals (track 6)
- Gary Hines – backing vocal arrangement (track 13)
- Dorian Holley – backing vocals (track 6)
- Bobette Jamison-Harrison – backing vocals (track 6)
- Jazzyfatnastees – backing vocals (track 11)
- Keith John – backing vocals (track 7)
- Marva King – backing vocals (track 12)
- Ladysmith Black Mambazo – backing vocals (track 4)
- Melody McCully – backing vocals (track 12)
- Branford Marsalis – saxophone (track 9)
- Della Miles – backing vocals (track 12)
- Aisha Zakiya Morris – additional backing vocals (track 6)
- Greg Moore – guitar (track 6)
- Munyungo – percussion (tracks 2, 8)
- Dr. Henry Panion III – string arranger (track 3), orchestration (track 3)
- Katrina Perkins – backing vocals (track 12)
- Greg Phillinganes – additional keyboard (track 2)
- Fernando Pullum – trumpet (track 2)
- Melvin "Wah Wah" Ragin – guitar (track 11)
- Nolan Shaheed – trumpet (track 2)
- Edley Shine – intro reggae chatting (track 8)
- Sounds of Blackness – backing vocals (track 13)
- John Stephens – alto saxophone (track 2)
- Bill Summers – percussion (track 2)
- Take 6 – backing vocals (track 5)
- Charles Veal – concert master (track 3)
- Vinx – percussion (track 3)
- Nathan Watts – "Nobody disses me" character (track 6), bass guitar (track 10)
- Deniece Williams – backing vocals (track 5)
- The Winans – backing vocals (track 7)
- Marvin Winans – backing vocal co-arrangement (track 7)
- Syreeta Wright – backing vocals (track 6)
- Charlene Atsumo, Susan Chatman, Richard Clark, Jim Getzoff, Harris Goldman, Felix Khomutov, Gary Kuo, Debra Price, James Sitterly, Jerome Webster, Tibor Zelig, Audrey Fischer, Lilia Kazakova, Zain Kahn, Thomas Tally, Wally DeAlmeida, Glen Grab, Marston Smith, Kevan Torfeh, Ida Bodin, Kevin Brandon, Paul Baker, Eleanore Choate, William Collette, Robert Shulgold, Galina Glek-Shlimovich, Gordon Halligan, Mark Cargill – strings, flute & harps (track 3)
- Yolanda Simmons, Aisha Zakiya Morris, Keita Sawandi Morris, Melody McCully, Mumtaz Ekow Morris, Cheryl Stone, Kwame Morris, Jossette Grant, Sophia Mashanda Morris, Lula Hardaway, Milton Hardaway, Calvin Hardaway, Larry Hardaway, Timothy Hardaway – "Conversation"/"Conversation peace" spoken words (track 13)

=== Technical ===
- Stevie Wonder – producer, (all tracks), arranger (all tracks), digital editing & album assembly
- Nathan Watts – associate producer
- Vaughan Halyard – associate producer
- Derrick Perkins – associate producer, original loops & programming
- Van Arden – engineer (all tracks), mixing (tracks 1–5, 7–11, 13)
- Steve Durkey, R. R. Harlan, Kimm James – additional engineers
- Jim Champagne, Ryan Foster, Anthony Gallagher, Tim Hoogenakker, Grant Mohrman, Neil Perry, James "Rock N' Roll" Sandweiss – assistant engineers
- Brant Biles - mixing (tracks 6, 12)
- Robert Margouleff – mixing (tracks 6, 12)
- Mark Cross – sound combinations
- Robert Arbittier – custom software design, digital editing & album assembly, digital audio & midi manipulation
- Michael Parish, Peter Vargo – equipment techs
- Milton Hardaway – cover coordinator
- Stephanie Andrews – Stevland Morris Music project manager
- Steve McKeever – executive in charge of production
- Jonathan Clark – art direction & digital illustration
- Shauna Woods – graphic design
- Todd Gray – photography
- Karen Kwak, Lisa Smith-Craig – A&R project coordinators

== Charts ==
=== Weekly charts ===
Weekly chart performance for Conversation Peace
Chart (1995)	Peak position
Australian Albums (ARIA)	81
Austrian Albums (Ö3 Austria)	17
Belgian Albums (Ultratop Wallonia)	25
Canada Top Albums/CDs (RPM)	48
Dutch Albums (Album Top 100)	19
German Albums (Offizielle Top 100)	34
Japanese Oricon Albums Chart	11
New Zealand Albums (RMNZ)	15
Norwegian Albums (VG-lista)	23
Scottish Albums (Official Charts)	39
Swiss Albums (Schweizer Hitparade)	28
UK Albums (Official Charts)	8
US Billboard 200	16
US Top R&B/Hip-Hop Albums (Billboard)	2

=== Year-end charts ===
Year-end chart performance for Conversation Peace
Chart (1995)	Position
Japanese Albums (Oricon)	151
US Top R&B/Hip-Hop Albums (Billboard)	63

== Certifications ==
Region	Certification	Certified units/sales
Japan (RIAJ)	Gold	158,000
United States (RIAA)	Gold	500,000^{^}
^{^} Shipments figures based on certification alone.
