= Never Had a Dream Come True (Stevie Wonder song) =

Single by Stevie Wonder

from the album Signed, Sealed & Delivered
- B-side: "Somebody Knows, Somebody Cares"
- Released: February 7, 1970
- Recorded: 1969, Hitsville USA, Detroit, Michigan
- Genre: Soul; pop; R&B
- Length: 3:14 (album and 45-rpm single labels show run time of 2:59)
- Label: Tamla
- Songwriters: Stevie Wonder; Henry Cosby; Sylvia Moy
- Producer: Henry Cosby

Stevie Wonder singles chronology
"Yester-Me, Yester-You, Yesterday" (1969)	"Never Had a Dream Come True" (1970)	"Signed, Sealed, Delivered I'm Yours" (1970)

Audio video
- "Never Had a Dream Come True" on YouTube

"Never Had a Dream Come True" is a song written by Stevie Wonder and Motown staff songwriters Henry Cosby and Sylvia Moy, released as a single on the Tamla subsidiary in February 1970. Featured on his 12th studio release, Signed, Sealed & Delivered, as the lead single, "Never Had..." was a modest hit in the U.S. upon its release, debuting at No. 67 on the Billboard Hot 100 during the week of February 7, 1970, peaking at number 26 for the week of March 7, and peaking at No. 11 on the R&B chart. The song received a boost in the UK, where it eventually peaked at No. 6.

== Background ==
Cash Box described the song as a "gentle ballad bombshell" and an "outstanding offering with across-the-board power." Billboard called it a "driving rock ballad with an infectious beat and good rhythm line."

== Personnel ==
- Lead and background vocals and clavinet by Stevie Wonder
- Instrumentation by the Funk Brothers and the Detroit Symphony Orchestra
- Arranged by Paul Riser

== Chart performance ==
Chart (1970)	Peak position
UK Singles (Official Charts Company)	6
U.S. Billboard Easy Listening	31
U.S. Billboard Hot 100	26
U.S. Best Selling Soul Singles (Billboard)	11
