= Signed, Sealed, Delivered I'm Yours =

1970 single by Stevie Wonder

"Signed, Sealed, Delivered (I'm Yours)"
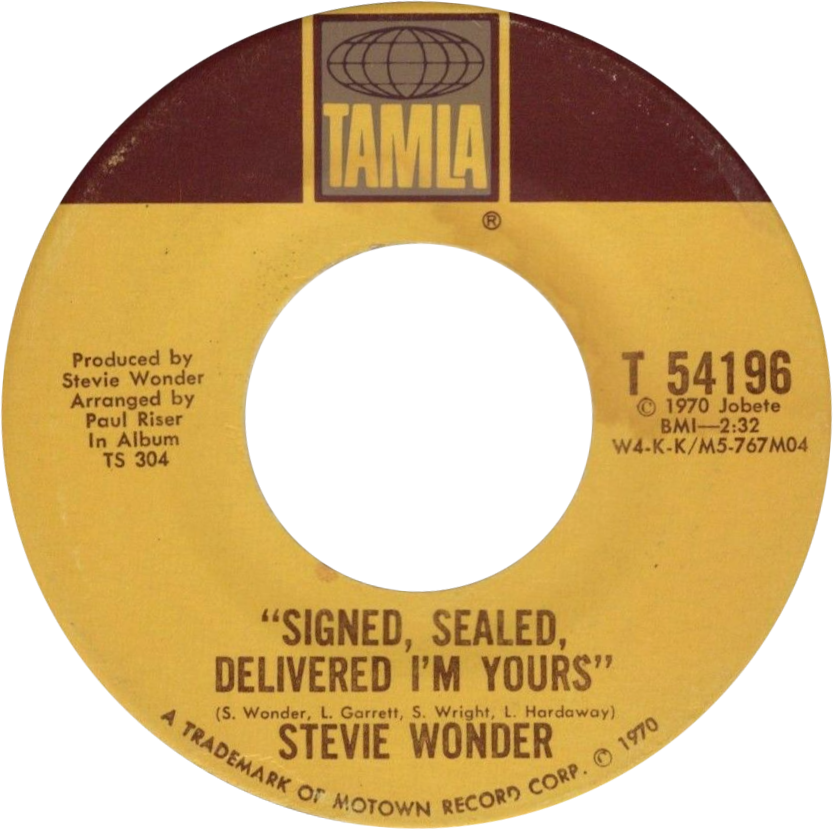
- One of side-A labels of the US single

Single by Stevie Wonder

from the album Signed, Sealed & Delivered
- B-side: "I'm More Than Happy (I'm Satisfied)"
- Released: June 3, 1970
- Recorded: August 26, 1969 – April 28, 1970
- Studio: Hitsville U.S.A. Studio A, Golden World (Detroit, Michigan)
- Length: 2:41
- Label: Tamla
- Songwriters: Stevie Wonder; Lee Garrett; Syreeta Wright; Lula Mae Hardaway
- Producer: Stevie Wonder

Stevie Wonder singles chronology
"Never Had a Dream Come True" (1970)	"Signed, Sealed, Delivered (I'm Yours)" (1970)	"Heaven Help Us All" (1970)

Audio video
- "Signed, Sealed, Delivered (I'm Yours)" on YouTube

"Signed, Sealed, Delivered (I'm Yours)" is a song by American musician Stevie Wonder. It was written by Wonder along with Lee Garrett, Syreeta Wright, and Lula Mae Hardaway for his twelfth studio album, Signed, Sealed & Delivered (1970), with production overseen by the singer. The song was released in June 1970 as a single on Motown's Tamla label. It spent six weeks at number one on the US R&B chart and peaked at number three on the US Billboard Hot 100 chart.

== Background ==
The song was a series of firsts for the 20-year-old Wonder: "Signed, Sealed, Delivered (I'm Yours)" was the first single Wonder produced on his own, and was also the first to feature his female backup singing group composed of Lynda Tucker Laurence (who went on to become a member of the Supremes), Syreeta Wright (who also co-wrote the song and later married Wonder), and Venetta Fields. "Signed, Sealed, Delivered I'm Yours" was arranged by Paul Riser and features an electric sitar played by Eddie "Chank" Willis. In the lyrics, the singer has left his girlfriend but realizes it was a mistake. "I've done a lot of foolish things that I really didn't mean." Now he has returned, making the commitment that he is back, similar to a special delivery package from the post office, "signed, sealed, delivered, I'm yours."

== Critical reception ==
The song gave Wonder his sixth Grammy nomination, with the award that year going to the Clarence Carter song "Patches". Cash Box stated that "Signed, Sealed, Delivered (I'm Yours)" was "polished and powerful enough to maintain an adult market power as well pointing toward giant sales." Billboard called it a "funky beat swinger" with "blockbuster sales appeal." Rolling Stone ranked the song 203rd on its list of The 500 Greatest Songs of All Time.

== Credits and personnel ==
Credits adapted from the liner notes of Signed, Sealed & Delivered.

- Lee Garrett – writer
- Lula Mae Hardaway – writer
- Paul Riser – arranger
- Stevie Wonder – producer, vocals, writer
- Syreeta Wright – writer

== Charts ==
=== Weekly charts ===
Weekly chart performance for "Signed, Sealed, Delivered I'm Yours"
Chart (1970)	Peak position
Canada Top Singles (RPM)	19
UK Singles (Official Charts)	15
US Billboard Hot 100	3
US Best Selling Soul Singles (Billboard)	1
US Cash Box Top 100	1

=== Year-end charts ===
Year-end performance for "Signed, Sealed, Delivered I'm Yours"
Chart (1970)	Rank
US Billboard Hot 100	31
US Cash Box Top 100	23

== Certifications ==
Certifications of "Signed, Sealed, Delivered I'm Yours"
Region	Certification	Certified units/sales
Denmark (IFPI Danmark)	Platinum	90,000^{‡}
Italy (FIMI)	Gold	25,000^{‡}
New Zealand (RMNZ)	4× Platinum	120,000^{‡}
Spain (Promusicae)	Gold	30,000^{‡}
United Kingdom (BPI)	2× Platinum	1,200,000^{‡}
United States	—	1,000,000
^{‡} Sales+streaming figures based on certification alone.

== Peter Frampton cover ==
"Signed, Sealed, Delivered (I'm Yours)"
- Artwork for some non-UK releases

Single by Peter Frampton

from the album I'm in You
- B-side: "Rocky's Hot Club"
- Released: August 1977
- Genre: Pop
- Label: A&M
- Songwriters: Stevie Wonder; Lee Garrett; Syreeta Wright; Lula Mae Hardaway
- Producer: Peter Frampton

Peter Frampton singles chronology
"I'm in You" (1977)	"Signed, Sealed, Delivered (I'm Yours)" (1977)	"Tried to Love" (1977)

Audio
- "Signed, Sealed, Delivered I'm Yours" on YouTube

In 1977, Peter Frampton recorded the song on his album I'm in You. His version also contains instrumental elements from Wonder's hit "For Once in My Life". Mick Jagger is featured on backing vocals. Frampton's version was released as a single, reaching number 18 on the Billboard Hot 100 and number 13 on the Cash Box Top 100. His cover also reached number 13 in Canada. In Chicago, the song reached number nine on superstation WLS-AM, and in Toronto it reached number one on CHUM.

=== Charts ===
==== Weekly charts ====
Chart (1977)	Peak position
Canada Top Singles (RPM)	13
New Zealand (Listener)	24
US Billboard Hot 100	18
US Cash Box Top 100	13
US R&B Singles (Cash Box)	96

==== Year-end charts ====
Chart (1977)	Rank
Canada Top Singles (RPM)	117
US Billboard	125

== Blue version ==
"Signed, Sealed, Delivered (I'm Yours)"

Single by Blue featuring Stevie Wonder and Angie Stone

from the album Guilty
- B-side: "One Love"; "4-Play"
- Released: December 1, 2003
- Length: 3:33
- Label: Virgin; Innocent
- Songwriters: Stevie Wonder; Lee Garrett; Syreeta Wright; Lula Mae Hardaway
- Producers: Martin Harrington; Ash Howes

Blue singles chronology
"Guilty" (2003)	"Signed, Sealed, Delivered (I'm Yours)" (2003)	"Breathe Easy" (2004)

Music video
- "Signed, Sealed, Delivered I'm Yours" on YouTube

"Signed, Sealed, Delivered I'm Yours" was covered in 2003 by English boy band Blue. Their version includes vocals from Angie Stone and Wonder. The song was released as the second single from Blue's third album, Guilty (2003). In Australia, "Signed, Sealed, Delivered I'm Yours" was released two weeks before it was issued in the United Kingdom. American singer Janet Jackson was originally approached to cover the song with the group but could not proceed due to scheduling conflicts.

=== Critical reception ===
Betty Clarke from The Daily Telegraph called the song a "grunting cover," while AllMusic's Sharon Mawer found that "Signed, Sealed, Delivered I'm Yours" was "just not as strong a song" as "Sorry Seems to Be the Hardest Word." In a negative review, BBC Music critic Chris Long wrote: "Not even the presence of the legendary Stevie Wonder and the equally fantastic Angie Stone on "Signed, Sealed, Delivered, I'm Yours" can get the party started. Their appearance only serves to show how untalented these four lads are."

=== Chart performance ===
"Signed, Sealed, Delivered I'm Yours" peaked at number 11 on the UK Singles Chart. It was Blue's first single to miss the chart's top ten. Elsewhere, the song reached the top 20 on the charts of six other countries, including Denmark, Ireland, Italy, the Netherlands, and Spain.

=== Music video ===
A music video for "Signed, Sealed, Delivered I'm Yours" was directed by Max & Dania and largely filmed on the roof of the Maxfield Building on Santee Street in Downtown Los Angeles. The visuals tell the story of a group of boys trying to sneak into the rooftop party attended by Blue, Wonder, and Stone.

=== Track listings ===
UK CD1
No.	Title	Writer(s)	Producer(s)	Length
1.	"Signed, Sealed, Delivered I'm Yours" (featuring Stevie Wonder and Angie Stone)	Stevie Wonder; Lee Garrett; Syreeta Wright; Lula Mae Hardaway	Martin Harrington; Ash Howes	3:39
2.	"One Love"	Duncan James; Lee Ryan; Simon Webbe; Antony Costa; Mikkel S. Eriksen; Tor Erik Hermansen; Hallgeir Rustan	Stargate	3:25

UK CD2
No.	Title	Writer(s)	Producer(s)	Length
1.	"Signed, Sealed, Delivered I'm Yours" (radio edit)	Wonder; Garrett; Wright; Hardaway	Harrington; Howes	3:33
2.	"4 Play"	Simon Webbe; George Hammond‑Hagan; John Hammond‑Hagan	The Big Pockets	3:22
3.	"Guilty" (original demo)	Duncan James; Gary Barlow; Eliot Kennedy; Tim Woodcock	True North; Harrington; Howes	3:25
4.	"Signed, Sealed, Delivered I'm Yours" (video and photo gallery enhanced)			3:33

=== Credits and personnel ===
Credits adapted from the liner notes of Guilty.

- Antony Costa – vocals
- Tim Donovan – recording
- Reece Gilmore – drum programming
- Isobel Griffiths – brass contractor
- Simon Hale – arranger
- Martin Harrington – keyboards, producer, programming
- Ash Howes – keyboards, mixing, producer, programming
- Duncan James – vocals
- Femi Jiya – engineer
- Yvonne John Lewis – backing vocals
- Lee Ryan – vocals
- Angie Stone – vocals
- John Themis – guitar
- Keith Uddin – engineer
- Simon Webbe – vocals
- Stevie Wonder – vocals

=== Charts ===
==== Weekly charts ====
Weekly chart performance for "Signed, Sealed, Delivered I'm Yours"
Chart (2003–2004)	Peak position
Australia (ARIA)	31
Austria (Ö3 Austria Top 40)	35
Belgium (Ultratop 50 Flanders)	38
Belgium (Ultratip Bubbling Under Wallonia)	3
CIS Airplay (TopHit)	57
Croatia (HRT)	5
Denmark (Tracklisten)	7
Denmark Airplay (Tracklisten)	11
Europe (European Hit Radio)	13
Germany (GfK)	29
Hungary (Rádiós Top 40)	12
Ireland (IRMA)	17
Italy (FIMI)	11
Italy (Musica e dischi)	17
Latvia (Latvijas Top 40)	19
Netherlands (Dutch Top 40)	11
Netherlands (Single Top 100)	16
New Zealand (Recorded Music NZ)	22
Poland Airplay (Polish Airplay Charts)	7
Romania (Romanian Top 100)	37
Scottish Singles Sales (Official Charts)	11
Spain (Promusicae)	12
Spain Airplay (Top 40 Radio)	21
Sweden (Sverigetopplistan)	36
Switzerland (Schweizer Hitparade)	53
UK Singles (Official Charts)	11
UK Airplay (Music Week)	7
UK Hip Hop/R&B (Official Charts)	3

==== Year-end charts ====
2003 year-end performance for "Signed, Sealed, Delivered I'm Yours"
Chart (2003)	Position
UK Singles (OCC)	168

2004 year-end performance for "Signed, Sealed, Delivered I'm Yours"
Chart (2004)	Position
Hungary (Rádiós Top 40)	82
Netherlands (Dutch Top 40)	99
UK Singles (OCC)	192

=== Release history ===
List of releases of "Signed, Sealed, Delivered I'm Yours"
Region	Version	Date	Format(s)	Label(s)	Ref.
Australia	Solo release	December 1, 2003	CD	Virgin; Innocent	
United Kingdom	Solo release	December 15, 2003	CD	Virgin; Innocent	
Japan	with "The Gift"	December 17, 2003	CD	Virgin; Innocent	

== Other covers ==
- In the early 1970s, Bobby Byrd performed an up-tempo cover of this song on a single with other songs performed by James Brown and Lyn Collins.
- In 1982, the Boys Town Gang covered "Signed, Sealed, Delivered". It became a Top 10 hit in the Netherlands.
- In 1988, Ruby Turner covered the song on her album The Motown Songbook. It was released as a single and charted at number 77 in the UK and number 8 in New Zealand.
- In 1991, Australian singer Jimmy Barnes covered the song on his album Soul Deep.
- In 1995, Kim Wilde performed the track during the last episode of Don't Forget Your Toothbrush on UK television.
- Jazz fusion and contemporary jazz group Pieces of a Dream presented their version from the band's 1998 album Pieces.
- Former adult film star Colton Ford and dance diva Pepper Mashay recorded a club version of this song in 2004. This version went to number 9 on the Hot Dance Club Play and number 25 on the Hot Dance Singles Sales charts.
- In 2004, Arkells released a version of the song as the A-side to their Record Store Day release entitled Arkells Sing Motown.
- Michael Bolton released a cover of the song in early 2013 on his album Ain't No Mountain High Enough: A Tribute to Hitsville.
- In 2013, Straight No Chaser covered the song with Wonder on their Under the Influence album.
- Becca Tobin as her character Kitty Wilde covered this song on the fourth season of the musical comedy Glee as part of a tribute episode to Stevie Wonders titled "Wonder-ful".
- Rufus Wainwright released a version in 2017 that was part of a tribute for a fundraising gala that honored Wonder.
- In 2018, the Fearless Flyers covered the song (as "Signed Sealed Delivered") as part of their eponymous debut EP. The track features Sandra Crouch on tambourine and Blake Mills on guitar.
- For the 2021 Christmas special of the DreamWorks Animation franchise Trolls, titled Trolls: Holiday in Harmony this song is covered by Anderson .Paak, Anna Kendrick, Anthony Ramos, Ester Dean, and Justin Timberlake.

== Political usage ==
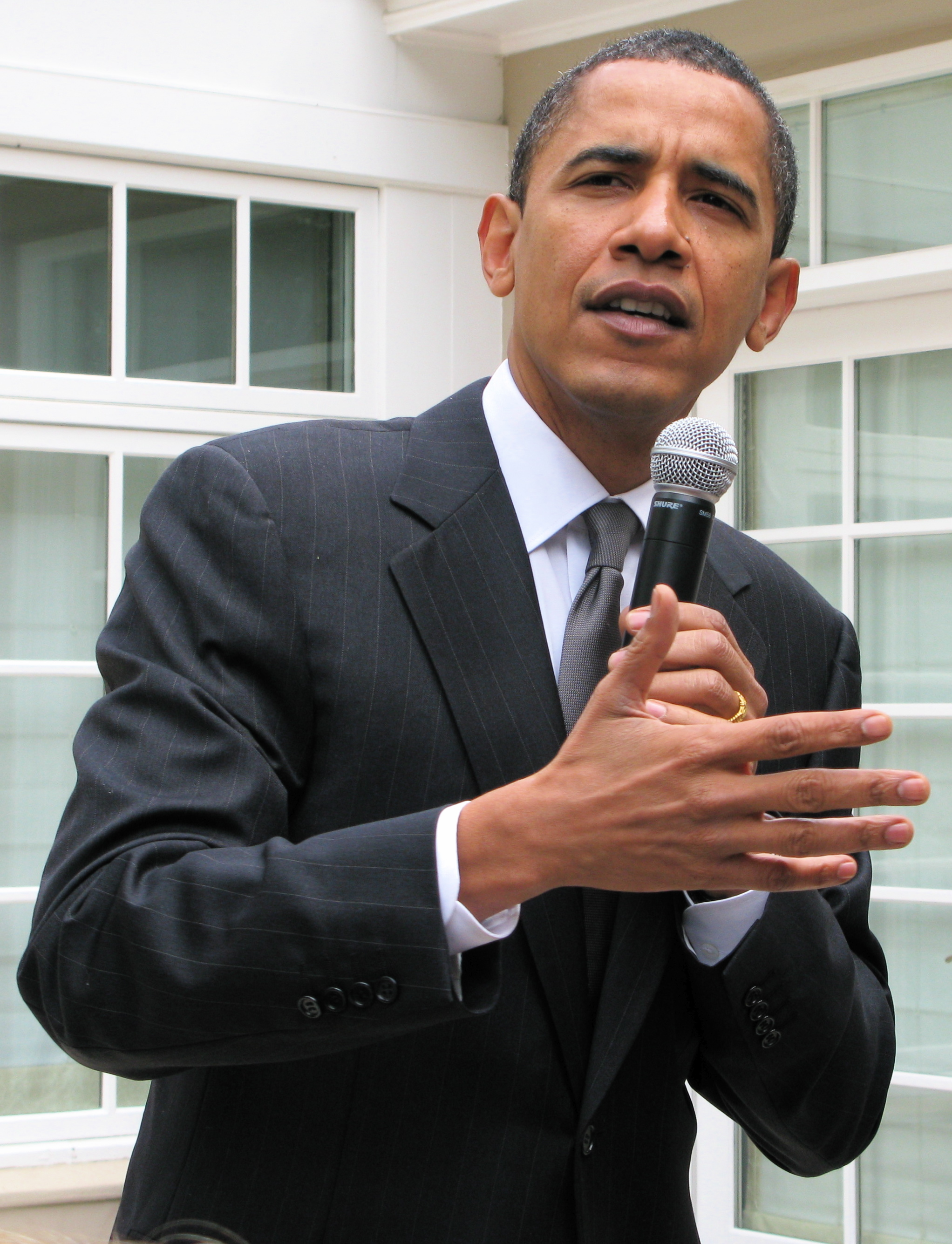
Barack Obama, a fan of Wonder's music, used the song frequently during campaign events in the 2008 presidential election

During the 2008 presidential election, Barack Obama's presidential campaign frequently played the song immediately after Obama's speeches at campaign events. Wonder performed the song live on the final night of the 2008 Democratic National Convention at Invesco Field in Denver, Colorado. During the campaign, Obama's chief campaign strategist, David Axelrod, used the song as the special ring tone on his cellular phone whenever he received a call from Obama.

At the 2016 Democratic National Convention, the song played after Barack Obama's speech, at which point Democratic nominee Hillary Clinton came out on stage.
