= My Cherie Amour (song) =

Single by Stevie Wonder

from the album My Cherie Amour
- B-side: "I Don't Know Why"
- Released: January 28, 1969
- Recorded: November 8, 1967 – January 15, 1968
- Studio: Hitsville U.S.A., Detroit, Michigan
- Genre: Soul; pop
- Length: 2:54
- Label: Tamla (T 54180)
- Songwriters: Stevie Wonder; Henry Cosby; Sylvia Moy
- Producer: Henry Cosby

Stevie Wonder singles chronology
"I Don't Know Why" (1968)	"My Cherie Amour" (1969)	"Yester-Me, Yester-You, Yesterday" (1969)

Audio video
- "My Cherie Amour" on YouTube

"My Cherie Amour" is a 1969 song by Motown singer-songwriter Stevie Wonder. The song reached number 4 on the Billboard pop chart in August to be Wonder's eighth top ten hit. The song was co-written by Wonder, Sylvia Moy, and Henry Cosby; Cosby also served as producer of the song. At the end of 1969, the song was ranked number 32 for the year.

== Background ==
The kernel of the song, originally titled "Oh, My Marsha" (or Marcia), was written in one hour in 1966 about a girlfriend of Wonder's at the Michigan School for the Blind in Lansing, Michigan. Tamla Records founder Berry Gordy listened to the song, and he thought it could be improved with more development. Motown songwriters Henry Cosby and Sylvia Moy collaborated on the song with Wonder; Moy came up with the intriguing title, a combination of English and French in a manner reminiscent of the Beatles' "Michelle" which was a massive hit in 1966.

The song's instruments (with the exceptions of the horns and the strings) were recorded on November 8, 1967, at Hitsville USA. On November 17, the horns and strings were added at Golden World Records, one year before it was acquired by Motown. Wonder's vocals were added on January 15, 1968. The song was shelved for a year, first appearing as the B-side of the single "I Don't Know Why", on January 28, 1969, timed to extend the chart performance of Wonder's album For Once in My Life, from which the single came. Motown promoted "I Don't Know Why" enough that it peaked at number 39 on the pop charts in March 1969, but many radio deejays were also flipping over the record and playing "My Cherie Amour". Wonder fell off the Hot 100 chart in April and most of May, but fan response to "My Cherie Amour" was building, and Tamla re-released the song for radio as the A-side. This song entered the Hot 100 on May 31 at number 70. It climbed for two months, and peaked at number 4 in the first week of August. At the same time, the song hit number 4 in the R&B charts. Wonder also released Spanish- and Italian-language versions titled "Mi Querido Amor" and "My Cherie Amor", respectively.

In June and July during the song's chart ascent in the US, Wonder was in the UK on tour. Motown saw an opportunity, and released "My Cherie Amour" as a single in the UK. The song entered British pop charts in late July, and five weeks later it had again hit number 4, this time holding position for three weeks straight. The total chart run was 15 weeks in the UK.

Cash Box described it as "a haunting ballad with a slight Latin underbeat." Billboard said "Poignant reading of this love ballad previously released as the flip side of Wonder's 'I Don't Know Why.' It should score in tab, easy listening markets as well as pop and quickly surpass sales of the original side."

The success of the song spurred Motown to program an album around it, filled with love songs. The album, My Cherie Amour, was released on August 29, 1969, with the title track leading Side 1. The single "Yester-Me, Yester-You, Yesterday" performed very well, hitting number 5 on the R&B chart at Thanksgiving 1969, and number 7 on the pop charts two weeks later.

== Legacy ==
- In 2014 "My Cherie Amour" was sampled by British DJ Philip George for his single "Wish You Were Mine" which topped the UK Dance Chart.
- In 1983 Wonder hosts Saturday Night Live and appears as a Wonder impersonator, 'Alan, The Stevie Wonder Experience' in a skit with talent agents played by Joe Piscopo and Eddie Murphy. 'Alan' does a terrible job of singing two other Wonder songs, and then Murphy tries to show him how to do it better, singing the first lines of "My Cherie Amour" in his well-known, polished Wonder impersonation. 'Alan' (Wonder) finally gets it, and continues the song in his actual singing voice, bringing the house down. As the applause ends, Murphy deadpans 'It still sucks man." (skit transcript)

== Charts ==
=== Weekly charts ===
Chart (1969)	Peak position
Canada Top Singles (RPM)	14
Canada Adult Contemporary (RPM)	14
Ireland (IRMA)	9
UK Singles (OCC)	4
US Billboard Hot 100	4
US Billboard Easy Listening	3
US Billboard Hot Rhythm & Blues Singles	4
US Cash Box Top 100	3

=== Year-end charts ===
Chart (1969)	Rank
Canada	97
U.S. Billboard Hot 100	32
U.S. R&B (Billboard)	23
U.S. Cash Box Top 100	52

== Certifications ==
Region	Certification	Certified units/sales
New Zealand (RMNZ)	Gold	15,000^{‡}
United Kingdom (BPI)	Silver	200,000^{‡}
^{‡} Sales+streaming figures based on certification alone.
