= Syreeta Wright =

American singer-songwriter (1946–2004)

- Wright in 1973

Background information
- Born: Rita Wright; August 3, 1946; Pittsburgh, Pennsylvania, U.S.
- Origin: Detroit, Michigan, U.S.
- Died: July 6, 2004 (aged 58) Los Angeles County, California, U.S.
- Genres: R&B; soul; Detroit soul
- Occupations: Singer-songwriter; actress
- Instrument: Vocals
- Years active: 1967–2004
- Labels: Motown; Motorcity
- Spouse: Stevie Wonder (m. 1970; div. 1972)

Syreeta Wright (born Rita Wright, August 3, 1946 – July 6, 2004), known as Syreeta, was an American singer-songwriter, best known for her music during the early 1970s through the early 1980s. Wright's career heights were songs in collaboration with her ex-husband Stevie Wonder and musical artist Billy Preston.

== Biography ==
=== Early life and career ===
Wright, who was of African-American heritage, was born in Pittsburgh, Pennsylvania, United States, in 1946, and started singing at the age of four. Her father, Lordian Wright, served in the Korean War, in which he was killed. Wright and her sister Kim were raised by their mother Essie and their grandmother. The Wrights moved back and forth from Detroit to South Carolina, before finally settling in Detroit just as Wright entered high school. Money problems kept Wright from pursuing a career in ballet, so she focused her attention on a music career, joining several singing groups, before landing a job as a receptionist for Motown in 1965. Within a year she became a secretary for Mickey Stevenson, just as Martha Reeves had done before her.

A year later, Edward Holland of the Holland–Dozier–Holland songwriting team noticed Wright's singing and decided to try her out for demos of Supremes' songs. However, in those days, the team of composers Ashford and Simpson had joined Motown and their songs were initially supervised by established producers. Edward's brother, composer and producer Brian Holland, co-wrote "I Can't Give Back the Love I Feel for You" with the couple, and produced it with Lamont Dozier for Syreeta. Brian felt Syreeta was a hard name to pronounce, and that Rita Wright would make a good stage name, so Wright's first solo single was released in January 1968 under that name, with "Something On My Mind" on the flip side. It is often said that the song was initially written for the Supremes (by then billed as "Diana Ross & the Supremes"), but Motown session logs indicate that the backing track was not recorded for anyone else previously. Later, Diana Ross re-recorded the song for her solo album Surrender, released in 1971.

Wright also performed demo vocals for the Supremes hit "Love Child" and for Ross's version of "Something On My Mind", released on her self-titled debut album. When Diana Ross left the Supremes in early 1970, Motown boss Berry Gordy considered replacing her with Wright, but offered the place in the group to Jean Terrell. According to several sources, Gordy then changed his mind and tried to replace Terrell with Wright, but this was vetoed by member Mary Wilson because Terrell had been announced in the media as the new lead singer and later during the final performance of Diana Ross & the Supremes.

Wright also sang background on records by the Supremes and by Martha and the Vandellas, notably singing the chorus to the group's modest hit single, "I Can't Dance to That Music You're Playing". Wright met labelmate Stevie Wonder in 1968, and the two began dating the following year. On the advice of Wonder, Wright became a songwriter. Their first collaboration, "It's a Shame", was recorded by The Spinners, in 1969. Motown withheld its release until July 1970. The song reached number 14 on the Billboard Hot 100. Wright also began singing backing for Wonder, most notably on the hit "Signed, Sealed, Delivered (I'm Yours)", which Wright co-wrote with Wonder. On 14 September 1970, after a year-long courtship, Wright, 24, and Wonder, 20, married in Detroit. The couple then wrote and arranged songs for Wonder's Where I'm Coming From, which was released much to Berry Gordy's chagrin in the spring of 1971. The Wonder–Wright composition "If You Really Love Me" (which also featured Wright prominently singing background vocals) reached number 8 in the US that year. In 1971 the couple relocated to New York City.

=== Solo career ===
In between working with Wonder on his albums, Wright decided to return to her own singing career. Motown reassigned the singer from Motown's Gordy imprint, where "I Can't Give Back the Love I Feel for You" was released, to Motown's L.A.-based MoWest subsidiary. Wonder and Wright had marriage troubles and divorced in the summer of 1972, ending their 18-month marriage. Following their divorce, Wonder oversaw the production of Wright's first solo album, Syreeta (released on June 20, 1972), which included her take of Wonder's "I Love Every Little Thing About You" from Music of My Mind, the Smokey Robinson classic "What Love Has Joined Together", and The Beatles' "She's Leaving Home", which featured both Wonder and Wright applying background vocals via the talk box. MoWest issued "I Love Every Little Thing About You" in the late winter of 1972, but it failed to chart. Remaining best friends, Wright would continue to provide background vocals and compositions with Wonder for the next two decades.

In 1974, Wright was again reassigned, this time to the Motown label proper (in the U.S.), and issued her second release, the aptly titled Stevie Wonder Presents: Syreeta that June. Following the success of Minnie Riperton's Perfect Angel, which Wonder also produced, Wonder wanted to present Wright in the same light as Riperton as a sensual vocalist. The covers also were very similar to each other. Riperton added background vocals to the album, primarily at the end of the album track "Heavy Day". The album yielded the UK singles "I'm Goin' Left" (covered by Eric Clapton and Jerry Butler), "Spinnin' and Spinnin'" and the reggae-flavored "Your Kiss Is Sweet", which became a UK top 40, reaching number 12 in 1975. The album also featured one duet with G. C. Cameron, formerly of the Spinners.

Production on Wright's third album, One to One mainly produced by Leon Ware, who also produced Marvin Gaye and Riperton, went on for two years. The album featured the sole Wonder production, "Harmour Love", which later would find some success after being featured on the 2005 movie Junebug. During this period Syreeta also made vocal contributions to two albums by American jazz saxophonist Gary Bartz - Juju Man (1976) and Music Is My Sanctuary (1977). In 1977, she teamed up again with G.C. Cameron on the duet album, Rich Love, Poor Love.

Wright's next effort came courtesy of a chance meeting with Billy Preston, who had signed with Motown in early 1979. Motown assigned the two to collaborate on a pop ballad for the movie Fast Break. Wright and Preston provided the soundtrack of the film and their first collaboration, "With You I'm Born Again", resulted in an international hit reaching number-four US and number-two UK in early 1980. The success of the song led Motown to renew Wright's contract, which was due to expire that year, with neither side looking to renegotiate. Wright and Preston continued their collaborations until the early 1980s including the 1981 duet album, Billy Preston & Syreeta. Wright had also sung on Billy Preston's appearance on the debut episode of Saturday Night Live, on October 11, 1975.

Wright still worked with Wonder during this period singing the lead vocals for their composition "Come Back as a Flower" for Wonder's 1979 album Journey through the Secret Life of Plants and also sung alongside Wonder on his 1980 song "As If You Read My Mind" for his Hotter than July album. Wright continued to provide background vocals until Wonder's 1995 album Conversation Peace.

Wright continued to record for Motown into the 1980s, releasing her second self-titled album in 1980, and the funk/boogie-oriented Set My Love in Motion in late 1981. The album featured the minor R&B hit "Quick Slick", which peaked at number 41 R&B in early 1982. At around that time, she added vocals to the theme song for the Canadian slasher-horror flick Happy Birthday to Me. Wright then issued The Spell in 1983, produced by Jermaine Jackson, and left Motown two years later after collaborating with Smokey Robinson for the soundtrack to Berry Gordy's The Last Dragon in 1985. She briefly recorded for Motorcity Records before retiring from show business for good in the mid-1990s and settling in Los Angeles with her four children. In 1993, she joined the national touring cast of Jesus Christ Superstar in the role of Mary Magdalene, alongside original film stars Ted Neeley and Carl Anderson. She stayed in the cast until 1995. In 1997, she guested on British soul singer Omar's album, This Is Not a Love Song, singing the duet "Lullaby".

== Personal life and death ==
Wright was married three times and had four children. Her first marriage, to longtime collaborator Stevie Wonder, lasted 18 months, from September 1970 until 1972. Wright married Curtis Robertson, with whom she had two children, Jamal (b. 1976) and Hodari (b. 1979). Wright and Robertson divorced in 1982.

Wright briefly lived in Ethiopia in the mid-1970s, where she worked as a Transcendental Meditation teacher. She eventually settled in Los Angeles, where she lived for the rest of her life.

Wright died in 2004 of congestive heart failure, a side effect of chemotherapy and radiotherapy treatments she was receiving for breast and bone cancer. She is buried in Inglewood Park Cemetery.

== Discography ==
=== Studio albums ===
Year	Title	Peak positions		
Year	Title	US	US R&B	AUS
1972	Syreeta	185	38	—
1974	Stevie Wonder Presents: Syreeta	116	53	93
1977	One to One	—	—	—
1977	Rich Love, Poor Love (with G.C. Cameron)	—	—	—
1979	Music from the Motion Picture "Fast Break" (with Billy Preston)	—	—	—
1980	Syreeta	73	39	—
1981	Set My Love in Motion	189	40	—
1981	Billy Preston & Syreeta	127	48	—
1983	The Spell	—	—	—
1990	With You I'm Born Again (Japan only)	—	—	—
"—" denotes releases that did not chart.

=== Singles ===
Year	Title	Peak positions				Certifications	Album
Year	Title	US	US R&B	AUS	UK	Certifications	Album
1968	"I Can't Give Back the Love I Feel for You"	—	—	—	—		Non-album single
1972	"To Know You Is to Love You"	—	—	—	—		Syreeta
1972	"I Love Every Little Thing About You"	—	—	—	—		Syreeta
1974	"Come and Get This Stuff"	—	—	—	—		Stevie Wonder Presents: Syreeta
1974	"I'm Goin' Left"	—	—	—	—		Stevie Wonder Presents: Syreeta
1974	"Spinnin' and Spinnin'"	—	—	—	49		Stevie Wonder Presents: Syreeta
1975	"Your Kiss Is Sweet"	—	—	—	12		Stevie Wonder Presents: Syreeta
1975	"Harmour Love"	—	75	—	32		One to One
1975	"One to One"	—	—	—	—		One to One
1977	"Let's Make a Deal" (with G.C. Cameron)	—	—	—	—		Rich Love, Poor Love
1979	"With You I'm Born Again" (with Billy Preston)	4	86	21	2	BPI: Silver	Music from the Motion Picture "Fast Break"
1979	"Go for It" (with Billy Preston)	108	—	—	—		Music from the Motion Picture "Fast Break"
1979	"More Than Just a Friend" (with Billy Preston)	—	—	—	—		Music from the Motion Picture "Fast Break"
1980	"It Will Come in Time" (with Billy Preston)	—	—	—	47		Late at Night
1980	"One More Time for Love" (with Billy Preston)	52	72	—	—		Syreeta
1980	"He's Gone"	—	—	—	—		Syreeta
1980	"Love Fire"	—	—	—	—		Syreeta
1980	"Let Me Be the One You Need"	—	—	—	—		Syreeta
1981	"A New Way to Say I Love You" (with Billy Preston)	—	—	—	—		Billy Preston & Syreeta
1981	"Searchin'" (with Billy Preston)	106	—	—	—		Billy Preston & Syreeta
1981	"Just For You" (with Billy Preston)	—	—	—	—		Billy Preston & Syreeta
1981	"Someone Special" (with Billy Preston)	—	—	—	—		Billy Preston & Syreeta
1981	"Love" (with Billy Preston)	—	—	—	—		Billy Preston & Syreeta
1981	"You Set My Love in Motion"	—	—	—	—		Set My Love in Motion
1981	"Can't Shake Your Love"	—	—	—	—		Set My Love in Motion
1981	"I Must Be in Love"	—	—	—	—		Set My Love in Motion
1981	"Move It, Do It"	—	—	—	—		Set My Love in Motion
1982	"Quick Slick"	—	41	—	—		Set My Love in Motion
1983	"Forever is Not Enough"	—	—	—	—		The Spell
1989	"If the Shoe Fits"	—	—	—	—		With You I'm Born Again
1991	"Watching the Hands of Time" (with Billy Preston)	—	—	—	—		With You I'm Born Again
"—" denotes releases that did not chart or were not released in that territory.

=== Other appearances ===
With Gary Bartz

- Ju Ju Man (Catalyst Records, 1976)

With Gary Bartz

- Music Is My Sanctuary (Capitol Records, 1977)

With Donald Byrd

- Thank You...For F.U.M.L. (Funking Up My Life) (Elektra, 1978)
