= Yester-Me, Yester-You, Yesterday =

1969 single by Stevie Wonder

Single by Stevie Wonder

from the album My Cherie Amour
- B-side: "I'd Be a Fool Right Now"
- Released: September 30, 1969
- Recorded: 1967
- Genre: Pop, R&B, soul
- Length: 3:06
- Label: Motown
- Songwriters: Ron Miller, Bryan Wells
- Producers: Harvey Fuqua, Johnny Bristol

Stevie Wonder singles chronology
"My Cherie Amour" (1969)	"Yester-Me, Yester-You, Yesterday" (1969)	"Never Had a Dream Come True" (1970)

Official audio
- "Yester-Me, Yester-You, Yesterday" on YouTube

"Yester-Me, Yester-You, Yesterday" is a soul song written by Ron Miller and Bryan Wells, released by American Motown singer-songwriter-musician Stevie Wonder on the album My Cherie Amour (1969). It peaked at number 7 on the Billboard Hot 100 the weeks of December 13 and 20, 1969 and became Wonder's ninth Top 10 single of the 1960s. In November 1969, it reached number 2 on the UK singles chart, making it Wonder's biggest UK hit at that time.

Stevie also recorded an Italian version with the title "Solo te, solo me, solo noi" (Only you, only me, only us), translated by Peter Ricci. The song was later reworked into an electronic version by Jennifer Rush on her 1985 Movin' album.

== Background ==
The song had been first recorded, in 1966, by blue-eyed Motown soul singer Chris Clark.

At the time the song was released, Wonder was going through some vocal problems and was required to wait before recording a song. Due to this, instead of making Wonder record new ones, they decided to release songs that he had recorded years earlier, and this song was one of them (it was recorded two years earlier). The song's main theme is nostalgia for a loved one.

Cash Box called it a "sparkling easy-blues-beat ballad" with "interesting lyric, performance and production."

== Personnel ==
- Lead vocals: Stevie Wonder
- Background vocals:
  - The Originals: Freddie Gorman, Walter Gaines, Hank Dixon, C. P. Spencer
  - The Andantes: Jackie Hicks, Marlene Barrow, Louvain Demps
- Instrumentation: The Funk Brothers

== Chart performance ==
=== Weekly charts ===
Chart (1969–70)	Peak position
Australia	11
Belgium	7
Canada RPM Top Singles	10
Canada RPM Adult Contemporary	15
Ireland (IRMA)	3
Netherlands	2
New Zealand (Listener)	10
South Africa (Springbok)	14
Spain (AFE)	18
UK Singles (OCC)	2
U.S. Hot 100 (Billboard)	7
U.S. R&B (Billboard)	5
U.S. Easy Listening (Billboard)	10
U.S. Cash Box Top 100	9

=== Year-end charts ===
Chart (1969)	Rank
Canada	47
U.S. (Joel Whitburn's Pop Annual)	75
