= Hal Davis =

American songwriter and record producer

- Born: Harold Edward Davis; February 8, 1933; Cincinnati, Ohio, U.S.
- Died: November 18, 1998 (aged 65) Los Angeles, California, U.S.
- Genre: Rhythm and blues
- Occupations: Songwriter; record producer; singer
- Years active: 1959–1998

Harold Edward Davis (February 8, 1933 – November 18, 1998) was an American songwriter and record producer. Davis was a producer and writer for Motown Records for nearly thirty years, and was a key figure in the latter part of the Motown career of the Jackson 5.

== Career ==
Davis began his music career in his teens as a singer, managed by Henry Stone. He released a string of singles under his own name, mainly for small labels, and moved to Los Angeles in 1960 where he continued to record but increasingly worked as a songwriter and record producer. He discovered young singer Brenda Holloway, and recorded duets with her on small local labels in the early 1960s. He also wrote and recorded with singer Jennell Hawkins.

In about 1962, he introduced himself to Berry Gordy, who installed Davis as head of Motown's first Los Angeles operation, later opening the MoWest label. Working with Marc Gordon, Davis was able to reproduce the elements of the Motown sound with Los Angeles musicians, and found success with records by both Brenda and her sister Patrice Holloway. In the mid-1960s, Stevie Wonder made a series of recordings including the album Stevie at the Beach and single "Hey Harmonica Man", co-produced by Davis. Most notably, Davis was the co-writer and producer of Jackson 5 hits such as "I'll Be There" and "Dancing Machine", and Eddie Kendricks' "Can I".

Davis also produced for Bette Midler (her Motown record of 1975, produced by Davis, was never released), Bobby Taylor & the Vancouvers, the Supremes, Gladys Knight & the Pips, Thelma Houston, Diana Ross, Florence Ballard, Mary Wilson, Marvin Gaye, Four Tops, Junior Walker, and the Miracles. During the disco era, he produced hit songs for Diana Ross ("Love Hangover"), Thelma Houston ("Don't Leave Me This Way") and Syreeta ("Can't Shake Your Love").

== Death ==
Davis remained with Motown until the 1990s. He died in 1998, aged 65.
