= Nothing's Too Good for My Baby =

Nothing's Too Good For My Baby may refer to:

- "Nothing's Too Good For My Baby" (Louis Prima song), a 1956 adaptation of "Listen to the Mocking Bird" by Louis Prima Featuring Keely Smith With Sam Butera And The Witnesses from the album The Wildest!
- "Nothing's Too Good For My Baby" (Stevie Wonder song), a 1966 single by Stevie Wonder from the album Up-Tight
