= Hey Harmonica Man =

Single by Stevie Wonder

from the album Stevie at the Beach
- B-side: "This Little Girl"
- Released: May 21, 1964
- Recorded: 1964
- Genre: R&B, soul
- Length: 2:38
- Label: Motown
- Songwriters: Marty Cooper, Lou Josie
- Producers: Hal Davis, Marc Gordon

Stevie Wonder singles chronology
"Castles in the Sand" (1964)	"Hey Harmonica Man" (1964)	"Happy Street" (1964)

Audio video
- "Hey Harmonica Man" on YouTube

"Hey Harmonica Man" is a single released by Stevie Wonder in 1964 from his album, Stevie at the Beach. It peaked at No. 29 on the Billboard Hot 100. Billboard said that "Stevie has hung his harmonica on a strong beat and a hit sound."

== Charts ==
Chart (1964)	Peak position
US Billboard Hot 100	29
US Hot R&B/Hip-Hop Songs (Billboard)	5
