= The Jazz Soul of Little Stevie =

1962 debut studio album by Little Stevie Wonder

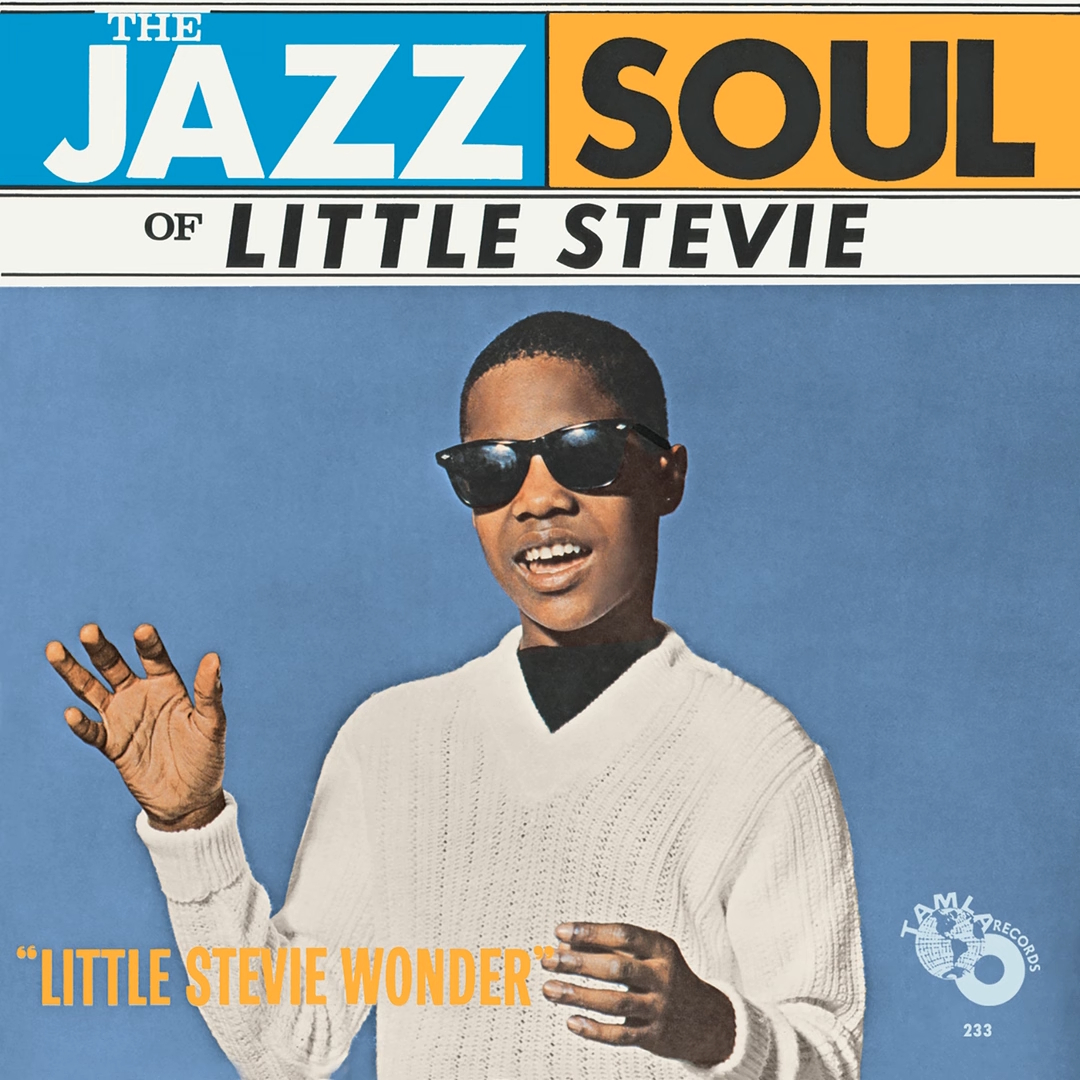

Studio album by Little Stevie Wonder
- Released: September 1962
- Studio: Hitsville USA, Detroit
- Genre: Jazz; soul; funk
- Length: 29:51
- Language: Instrumental
- Label: Tamla
- Producer: Henry Cosby; Clarence Paul

Little Stevie Wonder chronology
The Jazz Soul of Little Stevie (1962)	Tribute to Uncle Ray (1962)

Professional ratings
Review scores
Source	Rating
AllMusic	3.5/5 stars
Tom Hull	B

The Jazz Soul of Little Stevie is the debut studio album by Little Stevie Wonder, released in September 1962 on Tamla Records.

== Overview ==
The album showcases the 12-year-old Wonder's talents as a composer and instrumentalist. As with Eivets Rednow Wonder doesn't sing at all on this album, he only plays percussion, the keyboards, and the harmonica. Clarence Paul and Henry Cosby wrote and produced most of the album, though Wonder co-wrote two tunes. The original studio version of "Fingertips" is included on the album; a live version would become Wonder's first hit single.

== Critical reception ==
Professional ratings
Review scores
Source	Rating
Allmusic	3/5 stars

Bruce Eder of Allmusic praised the album saying, "Stevie Wonder's debut album, released when he was 11, is still an amazing musical document, showcasing his skills as a percussionist (drums and bongos), chromatic harmonica player, keyboardist (piano and organ), and composer -- and he was prodigious in all four categories. All of these skills are highlighted throughout this record, and Wonder's youthful, exuberant voice had a maturity suggesting that greatness was around the corner...What's more, a lot of what's here is extremely sophisticated instrumental music for its time, and the "jazz" reference in the title is not a matter of optimistic convenience or self-aggrandizement—a lot of this is legitimate jazz."

== Track listing ==
Side one
No.	Title	Writer(s)	Little Stevie on:	Length
1.	"Fingertips"	Henry Cosby; Clarence Paul	bongos	2:54
2.	"The Square"	Cosby; Paul	harmonica	2:58
3.	"Soul Bongo"	Paul; Marvin Gaye	bongos	2:23
4.	"Manhattan at Six"	Paul; Cosby	drums	3:40
5.	"Paulsby"	Paul; Cosby	organ and harmonica	2:44

Side two
No.	Title	Writer(s)	Little Stevie on:	Length
1.	"Some Other Time"	Cosby; Paul	harmonica	5:08
2.	"Wondering"	Stevie Wonder (as Judkins); Paul	organ	2:51
3.	"Session Number 112"	Wonder (as Judkins); Paul	piano and harmonica	3:17
4.	"Bam"	Berry Gordy, Jr.	harmonica	3:35
