= Eivets Rednow =

1968 studio album by Eivets Rednow (Stevie Wonder)

Studio album by Eivets Rednow
- Released: November 20, 1968
- Recorded: 1967–1968
- Studios: Hitsville U.S.A., Detroit, Michigan
- Genre: Easy listening
- Length: 32:01
- Label: Gordy
- Producer: Henry Cosby

Stevie Wonder chronology
Someday at Christmas (1967)	Eivets Rednow (1968)	For Once in My Life (1968)

Singles from Eivets Rednow
- 1. "Alfie" Released: August 27, 1968

Professional ratings
Review scores
Source	Rating
Allmusic	link

Eivets Rednow is the ninth studio album by American singer, songwriter, and musician Stevie Wonder, under the name Eivets Rednow. Released on the Gordy Records label on November 20, 1968, it is a fully instrumental album and was the first to have songs that are solely credited to Wonder. The album was created as a follow-up to the successful single "Alfie". "A House Is Not a Home", another song by Burt Bacharach and Hal David, also appears on the album. The album reached No. 37 on the U.S. R&B charts. "Eivets Rednow" is an ananym of "Stevie Wonder"; Wonder's name does not appear on the cover of the original releases.

Wonder plays the harmonica, drums, piano and clavinet on this album, though like his debut album, he does not sing on any of the tracks. On some reissues, "How do you spell Stevie Wonder backwards" is printed on the top corner of the album sleeve in small print.

== Track listing ==
Side one
No.	Title	Writer(s)	Length
1.	"Alfie"	Burt Bacharach, Hal David	3:14
2.	"More than a Dream"	Henry Cosby, Stevie Wonder	3:48
3.	"A House Is Not a Home"	Bacharach, David	3:32
4.	"How Can You Believe"	Wonder	3:04
5.	"Medley ("Never My Love/Ask the Lonely")"	Don Addrisi, Dick Addrisi/Ivy Jo Hunter, William "Mickey" Stevenson	2:30
Total length:			16:08

Side two
No.	Title	Writer(s)	Length
1.	"Ruby"	Mitchell Parish, Heinz Roemheld	6:48
2.	"Which Way the Wind"	Wonder	2:47
3.	"Bye Bye World"	Wonder	2:26
4.	"Grazin' in the Grass"	Philemon Hou	2:57
Total length:			15:53 32:01

== Personnel ==
- Stevie Wonder – harmonica, keyboards, drums, percussion
- Benny Benjamin – drums
- James Jamerson – bass guitar
- The Funk Brothers – instrumentation
