= With a Song in My Heart (Stevie Wonder album) =

1963 studio album by Stevie Wonder

Studio album by Stevie Wonder
- Released: December 28, 1963
- Recorded: 1963
- Studio: Hitsville U.S.A., Detroit, Michigan (vocals); Los Angeles, California (instrumentation)
- Genre: Soul; jazz
- Length: 32:41
- Label: Tamla
- Producer: Clarence Paul; William "Mickey" Stevenson

Stevie Wonder chronology
Recorded Live: The 12 Year Old Genius (1963)	With a Song in My Heart (1963)	Stevie at the Beach (1964)

Professional ratings
Review scores
Source	Rating
AllMusic	3/5 stars
Tom Hull	C−

With a Song in My Heart is the third studio album by Stevie Wonder, released on December 28, 1963, on the Tamla (Motown) label. The album was his first to drop the "Little" prefix from his stage name, as the 13-year-old singer followed the example of his labelmate Marvin Gaye by covering a selection of pop standards. Like Gaye and other Motown acts, label president Berry Gordy intended to establish his artists on a crossover basis. The album did not immediately bring success for Wonder on the adult contemporary market. Veteran jazz musician Ernie Wilkins arranged and conducted the album.

== Track listing ==
Side one

1. "With a Song in My Heart" (Lorenz Hart, Richard Rodgers) – 3:11
2. "When You Wish Upon a Star" (Ned Washington, Leigh Harline) – 2:59
3. "Smile" (Charlie Chaplin, Geoffrey Parsons, John Turner) – 3:20
4. "Make Someone Happy" (Betty Comden, Adolph Green, Jule Styne) – 5:04
5. "Dream" (Johnny Mercer) – 2:50

Side two

1. "Put on a Happy Face" (Charles Strouse, Lee Adams) – 2:37
2. "On the Sunny Side of the Street" (Dorothy Fields, Jimmy McHugh) – 3:58
3. "Get Happy" (Harold Arlen, Ted Koehler) – 2:12
4. "Give Your Heart a Chance" (Ron Miller, Orlando Murden, Kenneth O'Neil) – 2:16
5. "Without a Song" (Edward Eliscu, Billy Rose, Vincent Youmans) – 4:14

== Personnel ==
- Stevie Wonder - vocals, harmonica on "On the Sunny Side of the Street"
- Ernie Wilkins - arranger, conductor
- Various Los Angeles session musicians - instrumentation
