= Fingertips =

1963 single by Stevie Wonder

Single by Little Stevie Wonder

from the album Recorded Live: The 12 Year Old Genius
- A-side: "Fingertips – Part 1"
- B-side: "Fingertips – Part 2"
- Released: May 21, 1963
- Venue: Regal Theater, Chicago
- Genre: R&B, soul
- Length: 6:40 (full version); 2:49 (single part 1); 3:09 (single part 2)
- Label: Tamla
- Songwriters: Clarence Paul, Henry Cosby
- Producer: Berry Gordy, Jr.

Stevie Wonder singles chronology
| "Contract On Love" (1962) | "Fingertips" (1963) | "Workout, Stevie, Workout" (1963) |

Audio video
- "Fingertips" (Part 1 & 2) on YouTube

"Fingertips" is a 1963 hit single recorded live by Little Stevie Wonder for Motown's Tamla label. Written and composed by Wonder's mentors, Clarence Paul and Henry Cosby, "Fingertips" was originally a jazz instrumental recorded for Wonder's first studio album, The Jazz Soul of Little Stevie. The live version of the song was recorded in 1963 during a Motortown Revue performance at the Regal Theater in Chicago, Illinois. Containing only a few stanzas of improvised lyrics, "Fingertips" is essentially an instrumental piece, meant to showcase Wonder's talents on the bongos and the harmonica.

== Part 2 ==
The single version splits "Fingertips" into two parts, one on each side of the single. The edit point that begins "Part 2" is when Wonder shouts "Everybody say 'yeah!'", initiating a call-and-response exchange with the audience. After a couple of sung verses, each followed by Wonder's brief harmonica playing (solos accompanied only by the audience's rhythmic clapping), Wonder appears to bring things to a conclusion, right after playing a line of "Mary Had A Little Lamb" on his harmonica, making the audience laugh. On the night of the recording, Wonder, as usual started to leave the stage and the band went into the exit music, as musician and emcee Bill Murray (known professionally as Winehead Willie) exhorted the crowd to "give him a hand"; however, Wonder unexpectedly changed his mind, returning to sing the "goodbye" encore. The other musicians were caught out, and the bass players had changed over to prepare for the next act on the bill, Mary Wells. As Wonder moves into his impromptu encore, the new bass player, Joe Swift, having replaced Larry Moses, can be heard on the recording, yelling out: "What key? What key?"

== Release ==
The live version of "Fingertips" was released on May 21, 1963, as a two-part single, with Part 2 (with the encore) as the B-side. The 707 mono features "Sunset" and "Contract on Love". By August, the single B-side had reached the top of both the Billboard Pop Singles and R&B Singles charts. "Fingertips" was Motown's second number-one pop hit (following The Marvelettes' "Please Mr. Postman"), and launched the then 13-year-old Wonder to prominence. The single's success helped Wonder's live album, Recorded Live: The 12 Year Old Genius, reach number-one on the Billboard Pop Albums chart, making him the youngest artist to accomplish that feat. Because of Part 2's success, it would later feature on various compilation albums just as the full recording. In Canada the song reached number 6.

Both the studio and live versions of the song featured drumming by Marvin Gaye, who had been playing drums for Wonder and other Motown artists and would become a big Motown star in his own right.

== Personnel ==
- Vocals, bongos, and harmonica by Little Stevie Wonder
- Drums by Marvin Gaye
- Bass by James Jamerson, Larry Moses, Joe Swift
- Horn Arrangement by Johnny Allen
- Recording engineer, Ron Steele Sr.

== In popular culture ==
The song is used in trailers for Jordan Peele's movie Nope, as well as in More American Graffiti.
