= Motortown Revue =

The Motortown Revue was the name given to the package concert tours of Motown artists in the 1960s. Early tours featured Smokey Robinson & The Miracles, Mary Wells, The Marvelettes, Barrett Strong, and The Contours as headlining acts, and gave then-second-tier acts such as Marvin Gaye, Martha & The Vandellas, Stevie Wonder, The Supremes, The Four Tops, Gladys Knight & the Pips and The Temptations the chances to improve their skills.

== History ==
Motown's entire roster, and occasionally non-Motown performers such as James Brown and The Famous Flames, Otis Redding, Aretha Franklin, Dusty Springfield, The Shirelles and Patti LaBelle & the Bluebelles, were featured on the tours. Most of the venues for the early Motortown Revue tours were along the "Chitlin' Circuit" in the eastern and southern United States. In the Deep South racism became an issue, as the mostly African American performers were sometimes attacked or threatened by local white residents. While in the north the Motown artists generally played to mixed audiences, in the South, white and black audiences either attended separate shows, or were allowed to attend the same show as long as each race stayed on either side of a police-guarded rope, that divided the performance hall. Motown artists are credited with being among those who broke down these barriers so later audiences would no longer be separated by color.

It was from a live Motortown Revue performance that Little Stevie Wonder got his first big hit, the 1963 No. 1 hit "Fingertips (Pt. 2)". Motown CEO Berry Gordy, Jr. noted in his biography, To Be Loved, that the Revue was used to showcase Stevie Wonder in the days before he had his first hit. Also, Smokey Robinson and the other Miracles composed songs such as "The Way You Do the Things You Do" and "My Girl" while on the road, which later became hits for The Temptations. The Miracles, Motown's first star act (and first million-selling group), always closed the show.

After becoming a major force in the music industry during the mid-1960s, Motown continued to organize group tours under the Motortown Revue name. Later tours from the mid-1960s on covered the entire United States, and other countries including the UK and France.

The revue was filmed during a December 1962 week-long stand at the Apollo Theater and, in 1963, Motown released audio edits from the films as a series of live LPs. The films themselves have never had an authorized exhibition other than occasional brief snippets in a Motown TV special.

A four-CD box set compiling the four issued albums of Motortown Revue live performances was released by Motown/Hip-O select in 2002, celebrating the Revue's 40th anniversary. Motortown Revue: 40th Anniversary Collection collected the various artist's Motown releases Motortown Revue, Vol. 1 Recorded Live at the Apollo (1963), Motortown Revue Vol. 2 (recorded at Detroit's Fox Theatre in 1964), Motortown Revue in Paris (recorded at the Olympia Theatre in 1965), and Motortown Revue Live! (recorded at the Fox Theatre in 1969).

In 2015, a double CD deluxe edition of the Motortown Revue in Paris was released, containing 12 previously unavailable and unreleased live tracks.

== Charts ==
=== Weekly charts ===
==== The Motor-Town Review, Vol. 1 ====
Chart (1963)	Peak position
US Billboard 200	75

==== The Motor-Town Review, Vol. 2 ====
Chart (1964)	Peak position
US Billboard 200	102

==== Motortown Revue in Paris ====
Chart (1965–1966)	Peak position
UK R&B Albums (Record Mirror)	3
US Billboard 200	111

==== Motortown Revue Live ====
Chart (1969)	Peak position
US Billboard 200	177
