= Recorded Live: The 12 Year Old Genius =

1963 live album by Little Stevie Wonder

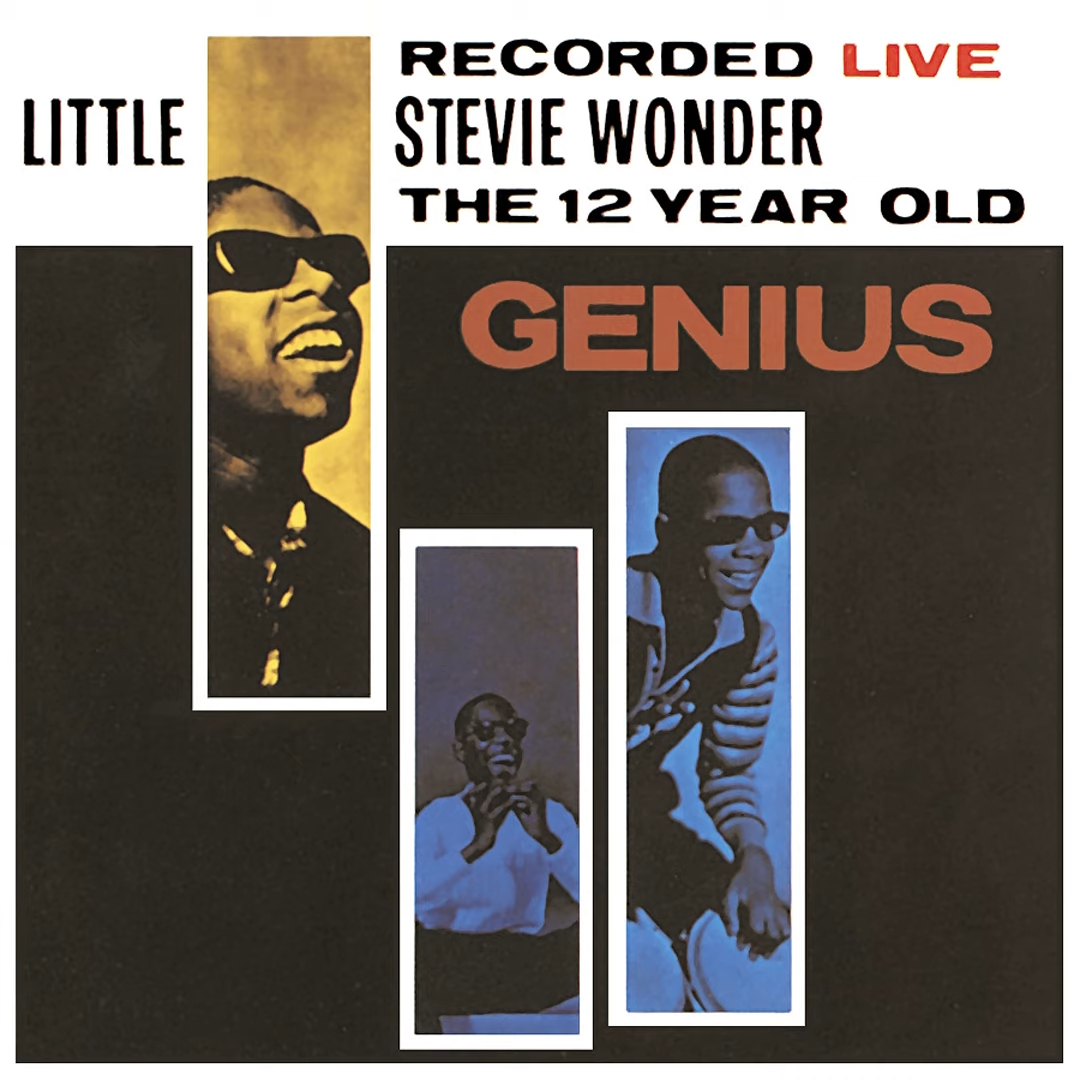

Live album by Little Stevie Wonder
- Released: May 21, 1963
- Recorded: June 1962
- Venue: Regal Theater, Chicago
- Genre: Soul
- Length: 23:36
- Label: Tamla
- Producer: Berry Gordy

Little Stevie Wonder chronology
Tribute to Uncle Ray (1962)	Recorded Live: The 12 Year Old Genius (1963)	With a Song in My Heart (1963)

Singles from Recorded Live: The 12 Year Old Genius
- 1. "Fingertips" Released: May 21, 1963

Professional ratings
Review scores
Source	Rating
AllMusic	3/5 stars
Tom Hull	B+
New Record Mirror	4/5 stars

Recorded Live: The 12 Year Old Genius is the first live album by Little Stevie Wonder. The album was released on the Tamla record label (catalog #240) in May 1963, the same month as the single release of "Fingertips" (catalog #54080). "Fingertips" topped both the Billboard Hot 100 chart and the R&B Singles chart, and Recorded Live: The 12 Year Old Genius topped the Billboard 200, all of which occurred in 1963. This is the last album to use the "Little" prefix in his stage name; starting with his next album, he was credited simply as "Stevie Wonder." Wonder is the youngest solo artist to chart a number-one album on the Billboard Top LPs chart, achieving the feat at 13 years old.

== Track listing ==
Side one
No.	Title	Writer(s)	Little Stevie on:	Length
1.	"Fingertips"	Henry Cosby; Clarence Paul	bongos, harmonica and vocals	6:40
2.	"Soul Bongo"	Marvin Gaye; Paul	bongos	3:01
3.	"La La La La La"	Paul	drums and vocals	2:34

Side two
No.	Title	Writer(s)	Little Stevie on:	Length
1.	"(I'm Afraid) The Masquerade Is Over"	Herbert Magidson; Allie Wrubel	vocals	5:13
2.	"Hallelujah I Love Her So"	Ray Charles	piano and vocals	2:48
3.	"Drown in My Own Tears"	Henry Glover	vocals	3:23
4.	"Don't You Know"	Charles; Berry Gordy	piano and vocals	3:19

== Charts ==
Chart performance for Recorded Live: The 12 Year Old Genius
Chart (1963)	Peak position
US Billboard Top LPs	1
