= Tribute to Uncle Ray =

1962 studio album by Little Stevie Wonder

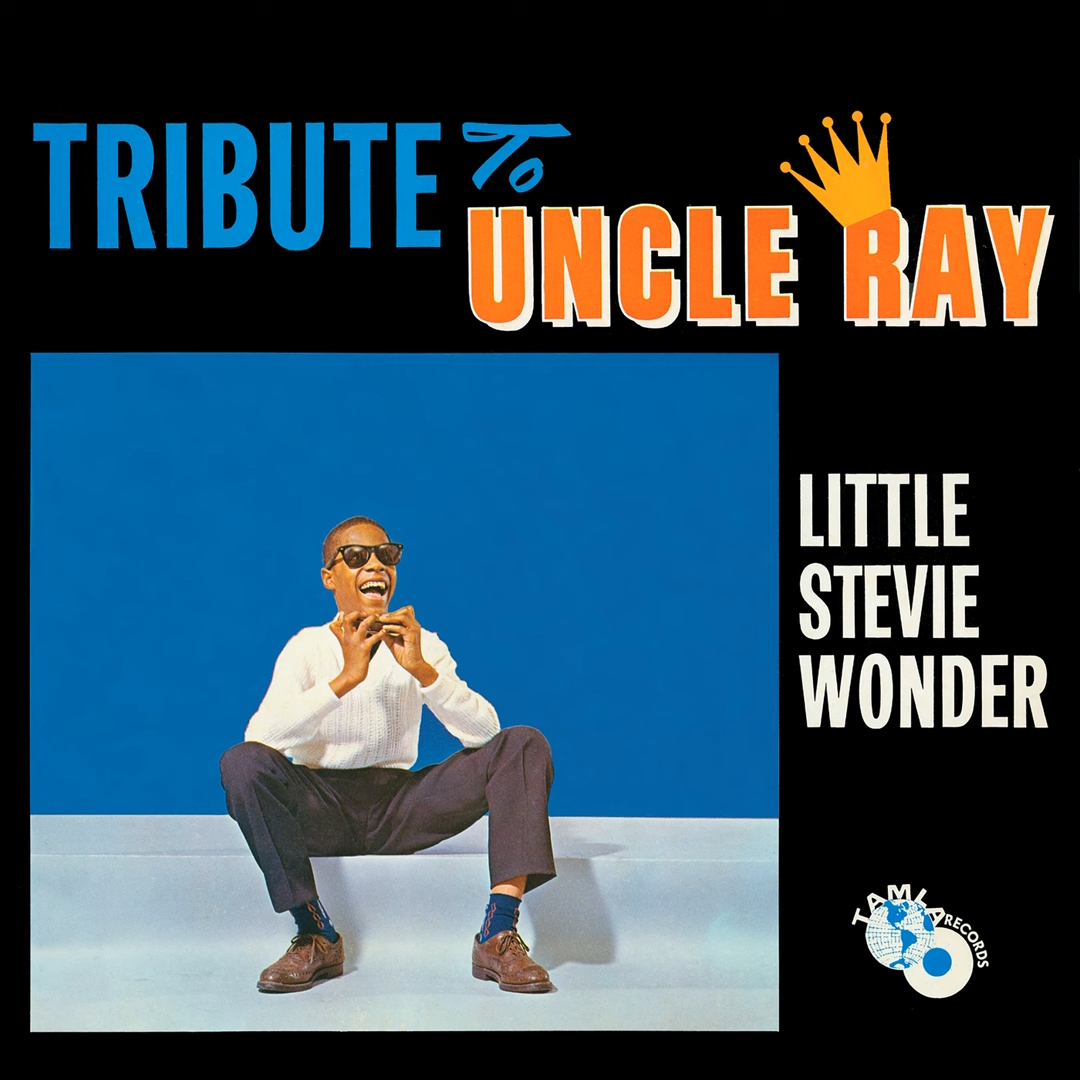

Studio album by Little Stevie Wonder
- Released: October 1962
- Recorded: 1962
- Studio: Hitsville U.S.A. Studio A, Detroit, Michigan
- Genre: Jazz; soul
- Length: 31:13
- Label: Tamla
- Producer: Henry Cosby; Clarence Paul

Little Stevie Wonder chronology
The Jazz Soul of Little Stevie (1962)	Tribute to Uncle Ray (1962)	Recorded Live: The 12 Year Old Genius (1963)

Professional ratings
Review scores
Source	Rating
AllMusic	2/5 stars
Tom Hull	B
New Record Mirror	4/5 stars

Tribute to Uncle Ray is the second studio album by Little Stevie Wonder, released by Motown in October 1962, shortly after The Jazz Soul of Little Stevie. Even though it was released second, it had been recorded first, when Wonder was 11 years old. The album was an attempt by Berry Gordy and Motown to associate the young Wonder with the successful and popular Ray Charles, who was also a blind African-American musician. Like Wonder's debut, this album failed to generate hit singles, as Motown struggled to find a sound to fit Wonder, who was just 12 when this album was released.

== Track listing ==
All songs composed by Ray Charles, except where noted.

Side one

1. "Hallelujah I Love Her So" – 2:28
2. "Ain't That Love" – 2:42
3. "Don't You Know" – 3:03
4. "(I'm Afraid) The Masquerade Is Over" (Herbert Magidson, Allie Wrubel) – 4:19
5. "Frankie & Johnny" (Traditional; arranged by Clarence Paul) – 2:51

Side two

1. "Drown in My Own Tears" (Henry Glover) – 4:01
2. "Come Back Baby" – 2:50
3. "Mary Ann" – 2:59
4. "Sunset" (Stevie Wonder as Stevie Judkins, Clarence Paul) – 3:32
5. "My Baby's Gone" (Berry Gordy, Jr.) – 2:28
