= Someday at Christmas =

1967 studio album by Stevie Wonder

Studio album by Stevie Wonder
- Released: November 27, 1967
- Genres: Christmas; R&B
- Length: 35:45
- Label: Tamla
- Producer: Henry Cosby

Stevie Wonder chronology
I Was Made to Love Her (1967)	Someday at Christmas (1967)	Eivets Rednow (1968)

Singles from Someday at Christmas
- 1. "Someday at Christmas" Released: November 22, 1966; 2. "What Christmas Means to Me" Released: November 1967

Someday at Christmas is the eighth studio album by Stevie Wonder, first released on November 27, 1967 by Motown Records under its Tamla imprint. Produced by Henry Cosby, it marked Wonder's first Christmas album. Someday at Christmas consists of twelve tracks, featuring four cover versions of Christmas standards and carols, as well as eight original songs, chiefly penned by Ron Miller along with his wife Aurora as well as Bryan and Deborah Wells, including its title track and "What Christmas Means to Me". "Twinkle Twinkle Little Me" had been included two years earlier on The Supremes' Christmas album Merry Christmas.

Upon its original release, Someday at Christmas failed to chart in the United States, although it peaked at number 50 on the Swedish Albums Chart. It has since been reissued several times, most recently in 2003 as part of Universal Music's Christmas edition of their successful 20th Century Masters series, including additional tracks. In 2020, it peaked at number 28 on the US Top Holiday Albums. The title track "Someday at Christmas" was previously released as a single in 1966 and reached number 24 on Billboard's Christmas Singles chart that year.

== Critical reception ==
Professional ratings
Review scores
Source	Rating
AllMusic	3/5 stars

In his retrospective review for AllMusic, editor Rovi Staff wrote that "with Someday at Christmas, Stevie Wonder applies his inimitable vocal technique to yuletide songs, some familiar, some not, with predictably successful results. In the title song he yearns for a Christmas when "Men won't be boys/playing with bombs like kids play with toys," striking a plaintive tone not usually found on Christmas albums. Although he is hopeful that the day will come, he sings that it may not happen any time soon. The song seems eerily prescient in light of the chaotic year that would follow Christmas 1967, when this record was released."

== 1978 re-issue ==
Someday at Christmas was re-released in 1978 with a different cover and catalogue number.

== Track listing ==
All tracks produced by Henry Cosby.

Side A
No.	Title	Writer(s)	Length
1.	"Someday at Christmas"	Ron Miller; Bryan Wells	2:47
2.	"Silver Bells"	Jay Livingston; Ray Evans	2:16
3.	"Ave Maria"	Franz Schubert	3:51
4.	"The Little Drummer Boy"	Kath K. Davis; Henry Onorati; Harry Simeone	3:01
5.	"One Little Christmas Tree"	Ron Miller; Bryan Wells	2:40
6.	"The Day That Love Began"	Ron Miller; Deborah Wells	3:29

Side B
No.	Title	Writer(s)	Length
1.	"The Christmas Song"	Mel Tormé; Robert Wells	3:01
2.	"Bedtime for Toys"	Ron Miller; Orlando Murden	3:21
3.	"Christmastime"	Sol Selegna	2:29
4.	"Twinkle Twinkle Little Me"	Ron Miller; William O'Malley	3:06
5.	"A Warm Little Home on a Hill"	Ron Miller; Wells	3:19
6.	"What Christmas Means to Me"	Anna Gaye; Allen Story; George Gordy	2:25

=== 20th Century Masters (2003) ===
No.	Title	Writer(s)	Length
13.	"The Miracles of Christmas"	Ron Miller; Aurora Miller	2:24
14.	"Everyone's a Kid at Christmas"	Ron Miller; Aurora Miller	2:46

== Personnel ==
Credits adapted from the album's liner notes.

Performers and musicians

- Stevie Wonder – vocals, harmonica, keyboards, drums
- The Funk Brothers – instrumentation
- The Andantes – backing vocals
- The Originals – backing vocals

== Charts ==
Chart (1967–2026)	Peak position
Canadian Albums (Billboard)	54
Dutch Albums (Album Top 100)	54
German Albums (Offizielle Top 100)	70
Swedish Albums (Sverigetopplistan)	50
US Billboard 200	85
US Top Holiday Albums (Billboard)	28
