= Jennell Hawkins =

American singer

- Born: Jennell Ruth Grimes; April 8, 1938; Los Angeles, California, U.S.
- Died: October 13, 2006 (aged 68)
- Genres: R&B
- Occupations: Singer, musician
- Instruments: Vocals, organ, piano
- Years active: 1954–2005
- Labels: Flair, Titanic, Amazon

Jennell Ruth Hawkins (née Grimes, April 8, 1938 – October 13, 2006) was an American R&B singer and musician who recorded in the 1950s and early 1960s and had a Top 50 chart hit in 1961 with "Moments to Remember".

== Biography ==
Jennell "Jenny" Grimes was born in Los Angeles, and while at Jefferson High School formed a singing group, the Fidelitones, with friends Marc Gordon (later a successful songwriter and record producer), Ray Brewster, and Bill Piper. She also became acquainted with fellow pupil and aspiring songwriter Richard Berry, and in 1954 she and Berry recorded one of his songs, "Each Step", with arranger Maxwell Davis, which was released on the Flair label, credited to Ricky and Jennell. She also played piano on "My Aching Heart" by the Flippers in 1955. Although initially reluctant, as she saw herself as more of a pianist and organ player than a singer, she joined Berry's backing group, the Dreamers, and sang lead on the Dreamers' own 1957 single, "Since You've Been Gone." She married Lawrence Hawkins in 1956, and around that time joined another vocal group, the Combonettes, who recorded three singles for the Combo label, including "Hi Diddle Diddle".

She made her first solo recordings in 1961, releasing "I Pity You Fool" on the Dynamic label before recording Richard Berry's song "Moments To Remember" on the small Titanic label. The record became locally successful and, retitled "Moments", was reissued by the larger Amazon record label owned by DJ Rudy Harvey. The record rose to no.16 on the national Billboard R&B Chart, and no.50 on the pop chart. She followed it up in 1962 with a version of Barrett Strong's hit "Money (That's What I Want)", co-written by Berry Gordy, which reached no.17 on the R&B chart. She also released two albums on the Amazon label, The Many Moods of Jenny (1961), credited to the Jennell Hawkins Quintet, and Moments To Remember (1962).

However, Hawkins became disillusioned with Harvey's business practices, although it was previously indicated that Harvey was a victim of an unsolved murder, Harvey's family disputes this claim and states he died of natural causes in 1992. Additionally Harvey's family indicates he was not involved in any shady business practices and was a successful business man as well as a devoted family man. Jennell left the recording business soon afterwards to devote herself to her family and church. She later worked for funeral companies, driving a hearse and playing the organ at funerals. In the 1970s she re-emerged with a sextet to back Johnny Morisette on his jazz-funk recording of "I'm Hungry". She also performed occasionally with her sextet in Los Angeles nightclubs, often appearing together with saxophonist Big Jay McNeely. In 2002, she reunited with the Dreamers to perform at a doo wop revival event.

She suffered a serious stroke in 2005, and died the following year at the age of 68, on the day she was due to receive a mayoral certificate to recognise her contributions to local music.
