= Stevie at the Beach =

1964 studio album by Stevie Wonder

Studio album by Stevie Wonder
- Released: June 23, 1964
- Recorded: 1963–1964
- Studios: Hitsville U.S.A., Detroit, Michigan (vocals); Los Angeles (instrumentation)
- Genres: Surf music; pop; R&B; soul
- Length: 24:27
- Label: Tamla
- Producers: Hal Davis; Marc Gordon; Dorsey Burnette

Stevie Wonder chronology
With a Song in My Heart (1963)	Stevie at the Beach (1964)	Up-Tight (1966)

Singles from Stevie at the Beach
- 1. "Castles in the Sand" Released: January 16, 1964; 2. "Hey Harmonica Man" Released: May 21, 1964; 3. "Happy Street" Released: September 14, 1964

Professional ratings
Review scores
Source	Rating
AllMusic	2.5/5 stars
Tom Hull	B−

Stevie at the Beach is the fourth studio album by American singer-songwriter Stevie Wonder, released by Tamla (Motown) on June 23, 1964. Theme-oriented around beach and surf culture, the album failed to achieve commercial success, with only "Hey Harmonica Man" reaching the charts. Following earlier attempts by the label to market Wonder as a Ray Charles-style artist or a lounge singer, the album struggled to find an audience. Wonder returned to commercial success in 1965 as Motown granted him greater creative autonomy.

== Track listing ==
Side one
No.	Title	Writer(s)	Length
1.	"Castles in the Sand"	Hal Davis; Marc Gordon; Mary O'Brien; Frank Wilson	2:12
2.	"Ebb Tide" (instrumental)	Robert Maxwell; Carl Sigman	1:46
3.	"Sad Boy"	Dorsey Burnette; Gerald Nelson	2:30
4.	"Red Sails in the Sunset" (instrumental)	Hugh Williams; Jimmy Kennedy	2:03
5.	"The Beachcomber" (instrumental)	Arthur Wright	1:48
6.	"Castles in the Sand" (instrumental)	Davis; Gordon; O'Brien; Wilson	1:54

Side two
No.	Title	Writer(s)	Length
1.	"Happy Street"	George Everette Hermic; Jule Styne	2:20
2.	"The Party at the Beach House"	Wilson	2:04
3.	"Hey Harmonica Man"	Marty Cooper; Lou Josie	2:38
4.	"Beachstomp"	Davis; Wilson	2:39
5.	"Beyond the Sea"	Charles Trenet; Jack Lawrence	2:47

== Personnel ==
- Stevie Wonder – vocals, harmonica, possible bongos, drums, and keyboards
- Various Los Angeles session musicians – instrumentation
- Uncredited – background singers
