= Marc Gordon =

American record producer and songwriter (1935–2010)

- Born: Marcus Melvin Gordon; October 14, 1935; Denver, Colorado, United States
- Died: June 16, 2010 (aged 74)
- Genres: R&B, soul, pop
- Occupations: Record producer, songwriter, manager
- Years active: c.1960 – c.2000
- Labels: Motown, Soul City, Rocky Road

Marcus Melvin "Marc" Gordon (October 14, 1935 – June 16, 2010) was an American Grammy-winning record producer, songwriter and music executive, best known for his work with Hal Davis at Motown, and for his later involvement with The 5th Dimension.

== Biography ==
Gordon was born in Denver, Colorado and initially worked as an engineer with the Howard Hughes Corporation. Around 1960, he started managing and also writing songs with R&B singer Hal Davis, in Los Angeles. Though Davis' own recordings were unsuccessful, he and Gordon continued to collaborate on the recordings of other musicians, including the Champs, Bobby Pickett, and the Hollywood Argyles; they sang backing vocals on the latter group's hit "Alley Oop". Gordon and Davis became a record production team and began working with teenage singer Brenda Holloway, as well as recording with Mary Love, a local singer for Modern Records, whose "You Turned My Bitter Into Sweet" became a Northern Soul favorite in the UK.

After meeting Berry Gordy, they were given the responsibility of recording material for Motown in Los Angeles. Between 1962 and 1965, Davis and Gordon collaborated on records including Little Stevie Wonder's "Hey Harmonica Man" and "Castles in the Sand" (and the album Stevie at the Beach), Brenda Holloway's "Every Little Bit Hurts" (a #13 US pop hit), and Frank Wilson's "Do I Love You (Indeed I Do)". They also produced albums by Marvin Gaye, the Supremes, and others. They acted as managers for many of the acts they recorded, and also produced records by Ike & Tina Turner, and the Ikettes.

Marc Gordon became President of Motown's Los Angeles office, before leaving the organization in 1965 and setting up an independent management company. He auditioned a new group, the Versatiles, and became their manager. They signed to a new label, Soul City, set up by singer Johnny Rivers, and Gordon changed their name to The 5th Dimension. Gordon and Rivers co-produced some of their early singles, and their 1967 debut album Up, Up and Away, for which he won a Grammy. Gordon introduced the group to songwriter Jimmy Webb and producer Bones Howe, and remained the group's manager through their later recordings. He also managed singer Thelma Houston, and, with Rivers, produced Al Wilson's recording of "The Snake". As with many of Gordon's earlier productions with Hal Davis, the recording became popular on the British Northern soul scene a few years later.

In 1969, Gordon married Florence LaRue, lead singer with The 5th Dimension, in a hot air balloon above the Century Plaza Hotel; they later divorced. In 1970, he formed Carousel Records, with Al Wilson, Sonny Geraci's band The Outsiders, producer Leon Ware and others. The label was renamed Rocky Road, and had a #3 US pop hit in 1972 with "Precious and Few" by Climax. In 1973, Al Wilson had the label's biggest hit with the million-seller, "Show and Tell", a US pop #1 (#10 R&B). After Rocky Road was taken over by Bell Records in 1974, Gordon continued to manage acts including The 5th Dimension, Thelma Houston, Al Wilson, the Staple Singers, Tony Orlando and Dawn, and Willie Hutch. He left the music business in 1979 and became involved in merchandising for the 1984 Summer Olympics, but returned to management in the 1990s.

He died in 2010, aged 74, after several years of ill health.
