= Up-Tight =

1966 studio album by Stevie Wonder

Studio album by Stevie Wonder
- Released: May 4, 1966
- Recorded: 1965–1966; 1962 ("Contract on Love"); 1964 ("Pretty Little Angel")
- Studio: Hitsville U.S.A., Detroit, Michigan
- Genre: Soul
- Length: 32:52
- Label: Tamla
- Producer: Henry Cosby; William "Mickey" Stevenson; Clarence Paul; Brian Holland; Lamont Dozier

Stevie Wonder chronology
Stevie at the Beach (1964)	Up-Tight (1966)	Down to Earth (1966)

Singles from Up-Tight
- 1. "Contract on Love" Released: December 26, 1962; 2. "Pretty Little Angel" Released: November, 1964; 3. "Uptight (Everything's Alright)" Released: November 22, 1965; 4. "Nothing's Too Good For My Baby" Released: March 24, 1966; 5. "Blowin' in the Wind" Released: May 4, 1966

Professional ratings
Review scores
Source	Rating
AllMusic	4.5/5 stars
Pitchfork	9.5/10

Up-Tight (shown as Up-Tight Everything's Alright on the cover) is the fifth album by American singer-songwriter Stevie Wonder. It was released by Motown on the Tamla label on May 4, 1966.

== Production ==
Up-Tight was recorded at Motown's studio Hitsville U.S.A. in Detroit. It includes two earlier recordings, the 1962 single "Contract on Love" and the un-issued 1964 single "Pretty Little Angel".

Also included on the album are "Nothing's Too Good for My Baby", another Wonder co-write, and a remake of folk star Bob Dylan's "Blowin' in the Wind", which made Wonder popular with crossover audiences, and a recording of the standard "Teach Me Tonight", featuring vocals by the Four Tops.

Stevie was backed by the Funk Brothers, the uncredited Motown Records studio musicians who helped define the '60s Motown sound. Motown's in-house female backing group, the Andantes, also accompany Wonder on the album. For one recording session, vocalist Pat Lewis stepped in as a replacement for a member of the Andantes.

"Pretty Little Angel" was listed as a single release in 1964. The track was mastered for single release in the fall of 1964 but not issued at that time. However, some copies were pressed two years later when the track was reconsidered for single release. These copies, of which there are very few, were pressed with the later style Tamla label (i.e. the post globes label) that was introduced in the US during the second half of 1966. The recording was again withdrawn when "A Place In The Sun" was considered superior.

== Release ==
The album was released on May 4, 1966, on Motown Records' Tamla label. The album features the U.S. Top 5 single "Uptight (Everything's Alright)", which Wonder co-wrote with Sylvia Moy and Henry Cosby.

== Commercial performance ==
The album reached No. 33 on the Billboard Pop Albums chart and No. 2 on the R&B Albums chart.

== Track listing ==
Side one
No.	Title	Writer(s)	Length
1.	"Love a Go Go"	Beth Beatty; Ernie Shelby	2:42
2.	"Hold Me"	Morris Broadnax; Clarence Paul; Stevie Wonder	2:35
3.	"Blowin' in the Wind"	Bob Dylan	3:45
4.	"Nothing's Too Good for My Baby"	Henry Cosby; Sylvia Moy; William "Mickey" Stevenson	2:38
5.	"Teach Me Tonight"	Sammy Cahn; Gene De Paul	2:38
6.	"Uptight (Everything's Alright)"	Cosby; Wonder (as S. Judkins); Moy	2:53

Side two
No.	Title	Writer(s)	Length
1.	"Ain't That Asking for Trouble"	Paul; Wonder; Moy	2:47
2.	"I Want My Baby Back"	Harvey Fuqua; Cornelius Grant; Eddie Kendricks; Norman Whitfield	2:46
3.	"Pretty Little Angel"	Paul; Wonder; Mike Valvano	2:11
4.	"Music Talk"	Ted Hull; Paul; Wonder (as S. Judkins)	2:52
5.	"Contract on Love"	Lamont Dozier; Janie Bradford; Brian Holland	2:02
6.	"With a Child's Heart"	Vicki Basemore; Moy; Cosby	3:03

== Personnel ==
- Stevie Wonder – lead vocals; harmony vocals (side 1, tracks 1 and 2; side 2, track 3); harmonica; keyboards; percussion
- Clarence Paul – co-lead vocals (on "Blowin' in the Wind")
- Levi Stubbs – co-lead vocals (on "Teach Me Tonight")
- Abdul "Duke" Fakir, Lawrence Payton, and Renaldo "Obie" Benson – backing vocals (on "Teach Me Tonight")
- The Andantes – backing vocals (side 1, tracks 2, 4, and 6; side 2, tracks 1, 2, and 4)
  - Pat Lewis – backing vocals (with the Andantes; unknown tracks)
- The Originals – backing vocals (on "Nothing's Too Good For My Baby")
- The Temptations – backing vocals (on "Contract on Love")
- The Funk Brothers – instrumentation
- Detroit Symphony Orchestra – instrumentation (on "Pretty Little Angel" and "With a Child's Heart")

== Charts ==
Chart performance for Up-Tight
Chart (1966)	Peak position
US Billboard 200	33
US Top R&B/Hip-Hop Albums (Billboard)	2
