= Stevie Wonder =

American musician (born 1950)

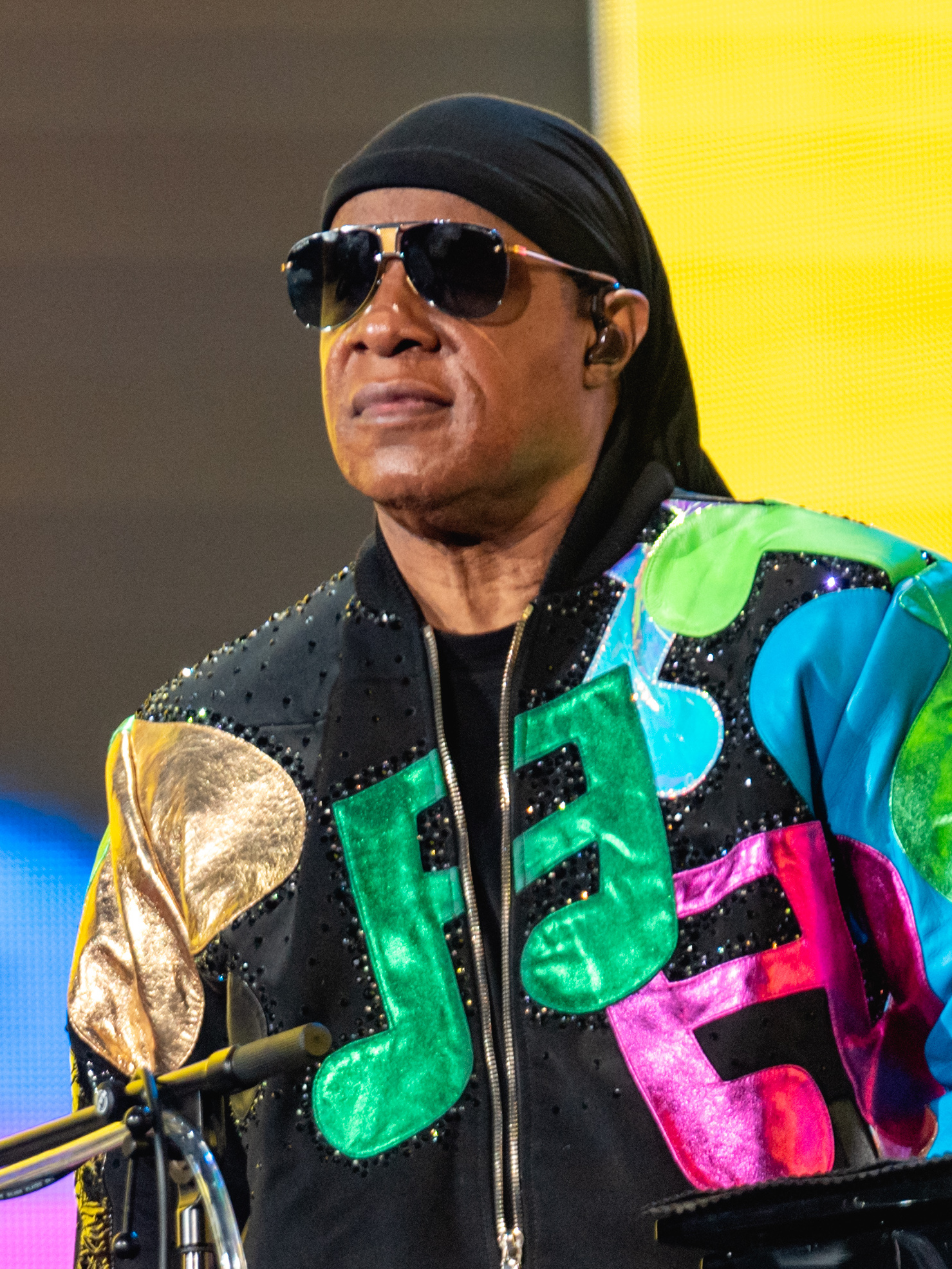
- Wonder in 2019
- Born: Stevland Hardaway Judkins; May 13, 1950 (age 76); Saginaw, Michigan, U.S.
- Other name: Little Stevie Wonder (1962–1964)
- Citizenship: United States; Ghana
- Occupations: Singer; songwriter; musician; record producer
- Years active: 1961–present
- Spouses: Syreeta Wright (m. 1970; div. 1972) Kai Millard (m. 2001; div. 2015) Tomeeka Bracy (m. 2017)
- Children: 9
- Mother: Lula Mae Hardaway
- Musical career
- Genres: Soul; R&B; pop; funk; gospel; progressive soul
- Instruments: Vocals; keyboards; harmonica; drums; harpejji
- Works: Discography
- Labels: Tamla; Motown; So What the Fuss Records
- Website: steviewonder.net

Stevland Hardaway Morris (/ˈstiːvlənd/ STEEV-lənd; né Judkins; born May 13, 1950), known professionally as Stevie Wonder, is an American singer-songwriter, musician, and record producer. He is widely regarded as one of the most influential musicians of the 20th century, and is credited as a pioneer and influence by musicians across a range of genres that include R&B, pop, soul, gospel, funk, and jazz. Wonder's use of synthesizers and other electronic musical instruments in the 1970s reshaped the conventions of contemporary R&B. He also helped drive such genres into the album era, crafting his LPs as cohesive and consistent, in addition to socially conscious statements with complex compositions.

Blind since shortly after his birth, Wonder was a child prodigy who signed with Motown's Tamla label at the age of 11, where he was given the professional name Little Stevie Wonder. As a teenager, he established himself as one of Motown's most successful acts, known for his excited harmonica playing and high-pitched singing. His single "Fingertips" topped the Billboard Hot 100 when he was 13, making him the youngest solo artist ever to top the chart. Wonder's critical and commercial peak, termed his "classic period" (1972–1976), began with the albums Music of My Mind and Talking Book (1972), which abandoned the Motown sound in favor of a synthesizer- and keyboard-driven one. With Innervisions (1973), Fulfillingness' First Finale (1974), and Songs in the Key of Life (1976), he became the first Black musician to win the Grammy Award for Album of the Year and the only artist to have won the award with three consecutive album releases.

In the 1980s, Wonder achieved international cultural presence, with high-profile collaborations (notably with Paul McCartney and Michael Jackson), television appearances, charity work, and political influence, including his 1980 campaign to make Martin Luther King Jr.'s birthday a federal holiday in the United States. Hotter Than July (1980), the soundtrack album The Woman in Red (1984), and In Square Circle (1985) all peaked within the top five of the Billboard 200. "Ebony and Ivory", "I Just Called to Say I Love You", "Part-Time Lover", and "That's What Friends Are For" all reached number one, making him the first act to top the Billboard Hot 100 in three consecutive decades. Wonder returned to the top five with his latest album, A Time to Love (2005), and he has continued to remain active in music and political causes.

Wonder is one of the best-selling music artists of all time, with sales of more than 100 million records worldwide. He has won 25 Grammy Awards (the most by a male solo artist until 2012) and an Academy Award. He has been inducted into the Rhythm and Blues Music Hall of Fame, the Rock and Roll Hall of Fame and the Songwriters Hall of Fame. He ranked in the top 10 on Rolling Stone's lists of the greatest singers and greatest songwriters of all time. In 2009, Wonder was named a United Nations Messenger of Peace, and in 2014, he was honored with the Presidential Medal of Freedom. He was conferred Ghanaian citizenship in 2024.

== Early life ==
Wonder was born Stevland Hardaway Judkins on May 13, 1950, in Saginaw, Michigan, the third of five children born to Lula Mae Hardaway, and the second of Hardaway's two children with Calvin Judkins. Wonder was born six weeks premature, a condition that, along with the oxygen-rich atmosphere in the hospital incubator, resulted in retinopathy of prematurity, a disease that aborts eye growth and often causes the retinas to detach, which left him blind.

When Wonder was four, his mother divorced his father and moved with her three children to Detroit. Wonder attended Whitestone Baptist Church, where he sang in the choir and became a soloist at age eight. His mother later rekindled her relationship with her first child's father (whose surname was also coincidentally Hardaway), changed her name back to Lula Hardaway, and had two more children.

Wonder began playing instruments at an early age, including piano, harmonica, and drums. He formed a singing partnership with a friend; calling themselves Stevie and John, they played on street corners and occasionally at parties and dances. When Stevie was signed by Motown in 1961, his surname was legally changed to Morris, which (according to Lula Mae Hardaway's authorized biography) was an old family name.

Wonder attended Fitzgerald Elementary School in Detroit. After his first album was released, The Jazz Soul of Little Stevie (1962), he enrolled in Michigan School for the Blind in Lansing, Michigan.

== Career ==
=== 1960s: Singles as a youth ===
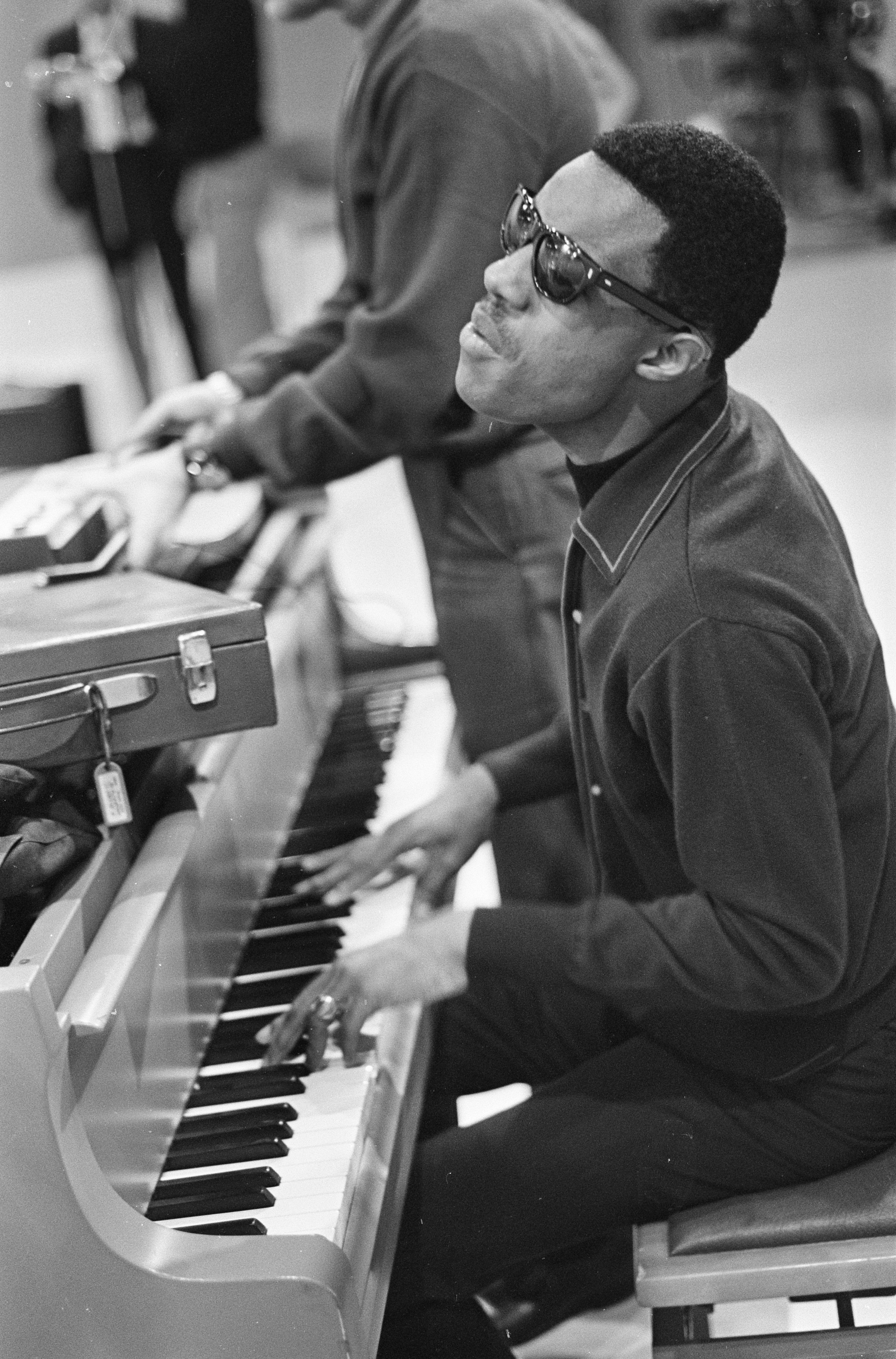
Wonder rehearsing for a performance on Dutch television in 1967

In 1961, at the age of 11, Wonder sang his own composition, "Lonely Boy", to Ronnie White of the Miracles; White then took Wonder and his mother to an audition at Motown, where CEO Berry Gordy signed Wonder to Motown's Tamla label. Before signing, producer Clarence Paul gave him the name Little Stevie Wonder. Because of Wonder's age, the label drew up a rolling five-year contract in which royalties would be held in trust until Wonder was 21. He and his mother would be paid a weekly stipend to cover their expenses: Wonder received $2.50 (equivalent to $26.93 in 2025) per week, and a private tutor was provided when Wonder was on tour.

Wonder was put in the care of producer and songwriter Clarence Paul, and for a year they worked together on two albums. Tribute to Uncle Ray was recorded first, when Wonder was still 11 years old. Mainly covers of Ray Charles's songs, the album included a Wonder and Paul composition, "Sunset". The Jazz Soul of Little Stevie was recorded next, an instrumental album consisting mainly of Paul's compositions, two of which, "Wondering" and "Session Number 112", were co-written with Wonder. Feeling Wonder was now ready, a song, "Mother Thank You", was recorded for release as a single, but then pulled and replaced by the Berry Gordy song "I Call It Pretty Music, But the Old People Call It the Blues" as his début single; released summer 1962, it almost broke into the Billboard 100, spending one week of August at 101. Two follow-up singles, "Little Water Boy" and "Contract on Love", both had no success, and the two albums, released in reverse order of recording—The Jazz Soul of Little Stevie in September 1962 and Tribute to Uncle Ray in October 1962—also met with little success.

Most of these songs hit the charts in a big way before Stevie turned twenty-one [in 1971]. Because he's grown up fast, the love lyrics are less teen-specific than a lot of early Smokey, say, but the music is pure puberty. Stevie's rockers are always one step ahead of themselves—their gawky groove is so disorienting it makes you pay attention, like a voice that's perpetually changing. The ballads conceive coming of age more conventionally, and less felicitously. But he sure covered Tony Bennett better than the Supremes or the Tempts could have, now didn't he?

— Review of Stevie Wonder's Greatest Hits Vol. 2 in Christgau's Record Guide: Rock Albums of the Seventies (1981)

At the end of 1962, when Wonder was 12 years old, he joined the Motortown Revue, touring the "Chitlin' Circuit" of theaters across America that accepted black artists. At the Regal Theater, Chicago, his 20-minute performance was recorded and released in May 1963 as the album Recorded Live: The 12 Year Old Genius. A single, "Fingertips", from the album was also released in May, and became a major hit. The song, featuring a confident and enthusiastic Wonder returning for a spontaneous encore that catches out the replacement bass player, who is heard to call out "What key? What key?", was a No. 1 hit on the Billboard Hot 100 when Wonder was aged 13, making him the youngest artist ever to top the chart. The single was simultaneously No. 1 on the R&B chart, the first time that had occurred. His next few recordings were not successful; his voice was changing as he got older, and some Motown executives were considering canceling his recording contract. During 1964, Wonder appeared in two films as himself, Muscle Beach Party and Bikini Beach, but these were not successful either. Motown producer/songwriter Sylvia Moy persuaded label owner Berry Gordy to give Wonder another chance.

Dropping the "Little" from his name, Moy and Wonder worked together to create the hit "Uptight (Everything's Alright)", and Wonder went on to have a number of other hits during the mid-1960s, including "With a Child's Heart", and "Blowin' in the Wind", a Bob Dylan song, co-sung by his mentor, producer Clarence Paul. He also began to work in the Motown songwriting department, composing songs both for himself and his label mates, including "The Tears of a Clown", a No. 1 hit for Smokey Robinson and the Miracles (it was first released in 1967, mostly unnoticed as the last track of their Make It Happen LP, but eventually became a major success when re-released as a single in 1970, which prompted Robinson to reconsider his intention of leaving the group).

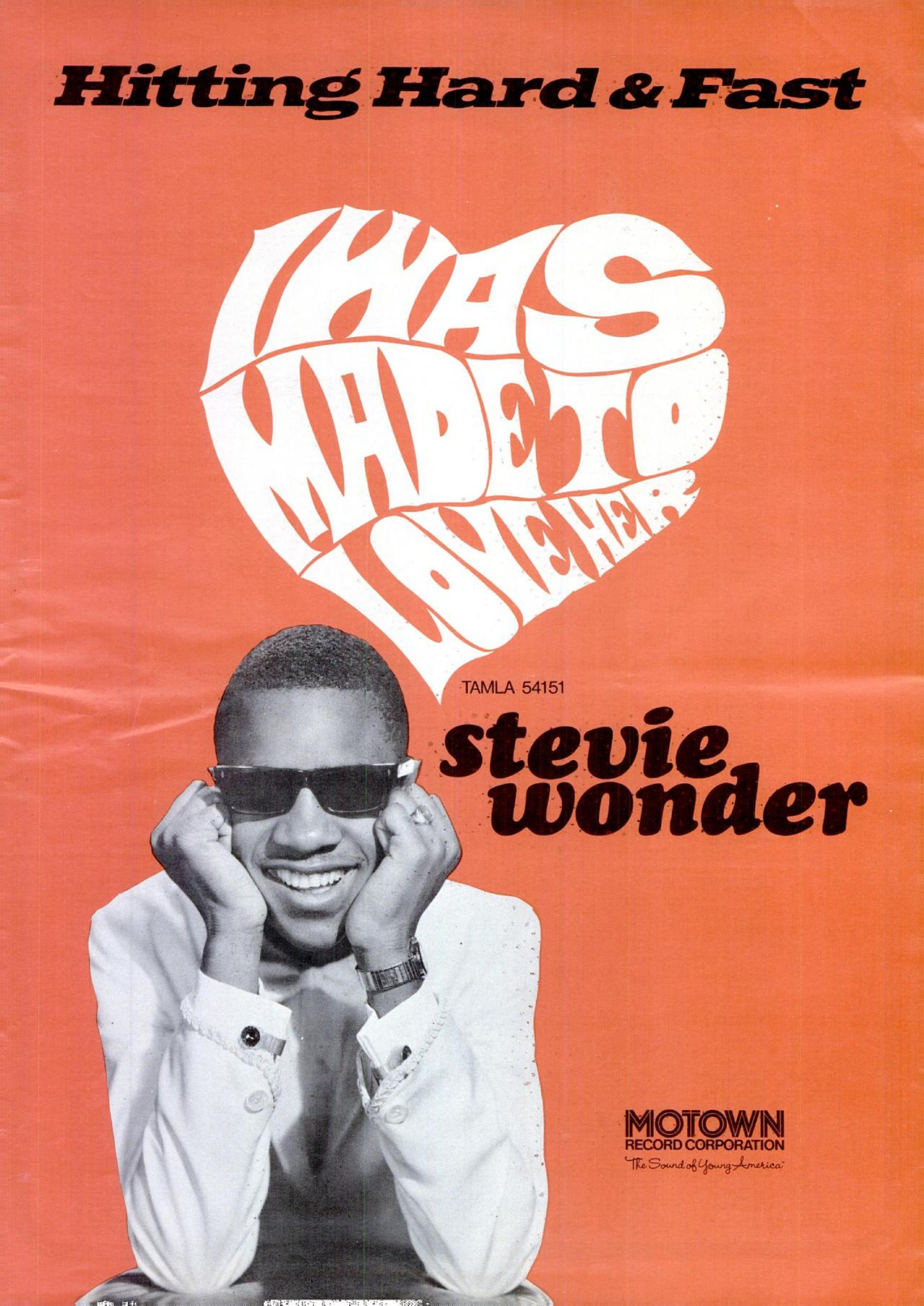
Billboard advertisement, June 17, 1967

In 1968, Wonder recorded an album of instrumental soul/jazz tracks, mostly harmonica solos, under the title Eivets Rednow, which is "Stevie Wonder" spelled backward. The album failed to get much attention, and its only single, a cover of Burt Bacharach's and Hal David's "Alfie", only reached number 66 on the Billboard Hot 100 and number 11 on the Adult Contemporary chart. Nonetheless, he managed to score several hits between 1967 and 1970 such as "I Was Made to Love Her", "For Once in My Life" and "Signed, Sealed, Delivered I'm Yours". A number of Wonder's early hits, including "My Cherie Amour", "I Was Made to Love Her", and "Uptight (Everything's Alright)", were co-written with Henry Cosby. The hit single "Signed, Sealed, Delivered I'm Yours" was Wonder's first-ever self-produced song.

In 1969, Wonder participated in the Sanremo Music Festival in Italy with the song "Se tu ragazzo mio", in conjunction with Gabriella Ferri. Between 1967 and 1970, he recorded four 45 rpm singles and an Italian LP.

Wonder's appearance at the 1969 Harlem Cultural Festival opens the 2021 music documentary, Summer of Soul. Wonder plays a drum solo during his set.

=== 1970s: Classic period ===
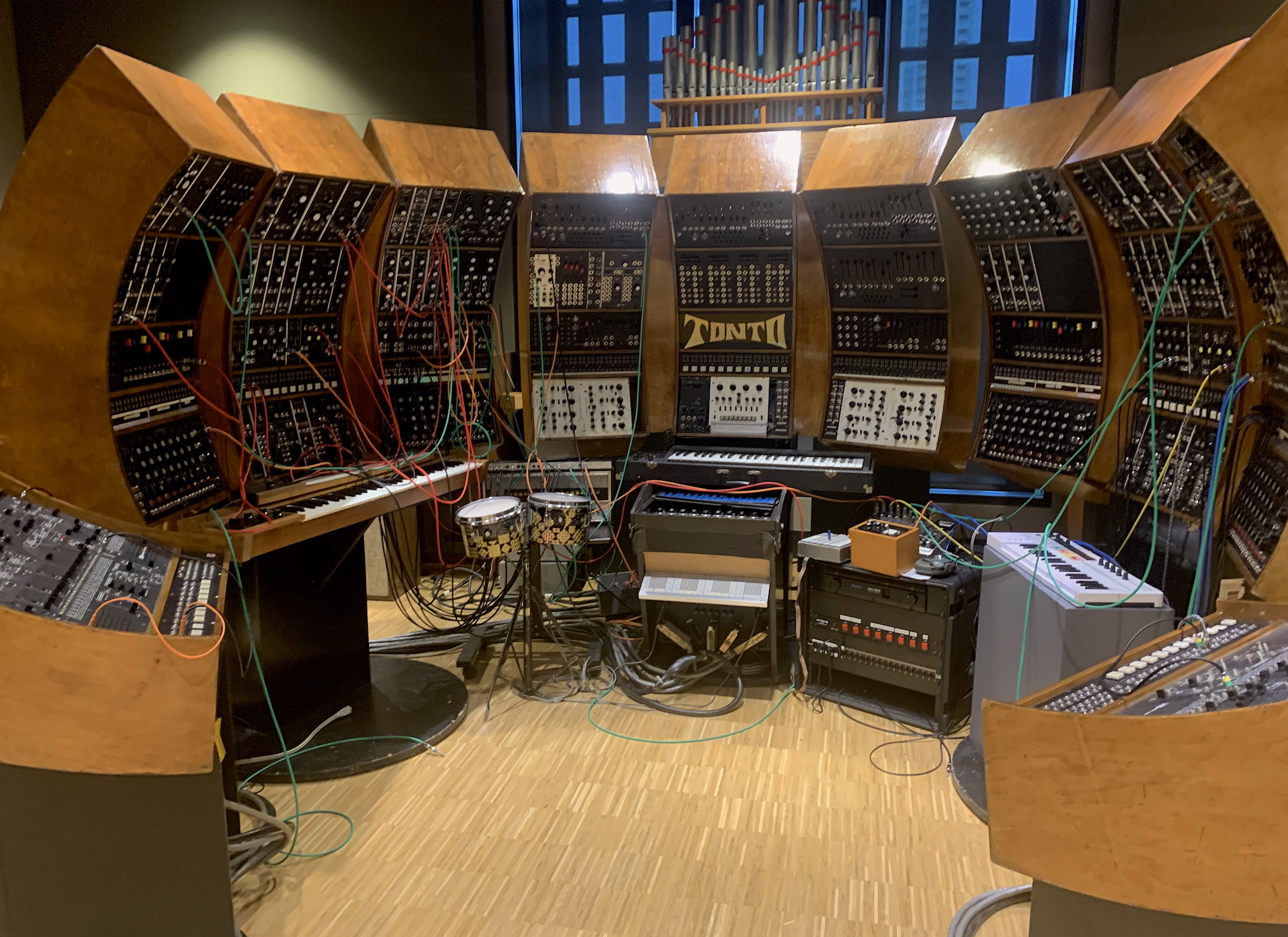
The TONTO synthesizer, built and programmed by Robert Margouleff and Malcolm Cecil, whose work and custom-built synthesizer defined the sound of Wonder's four albums between 1972 and 1974. Pictured at the National Music Centre, Canada, in 2024.

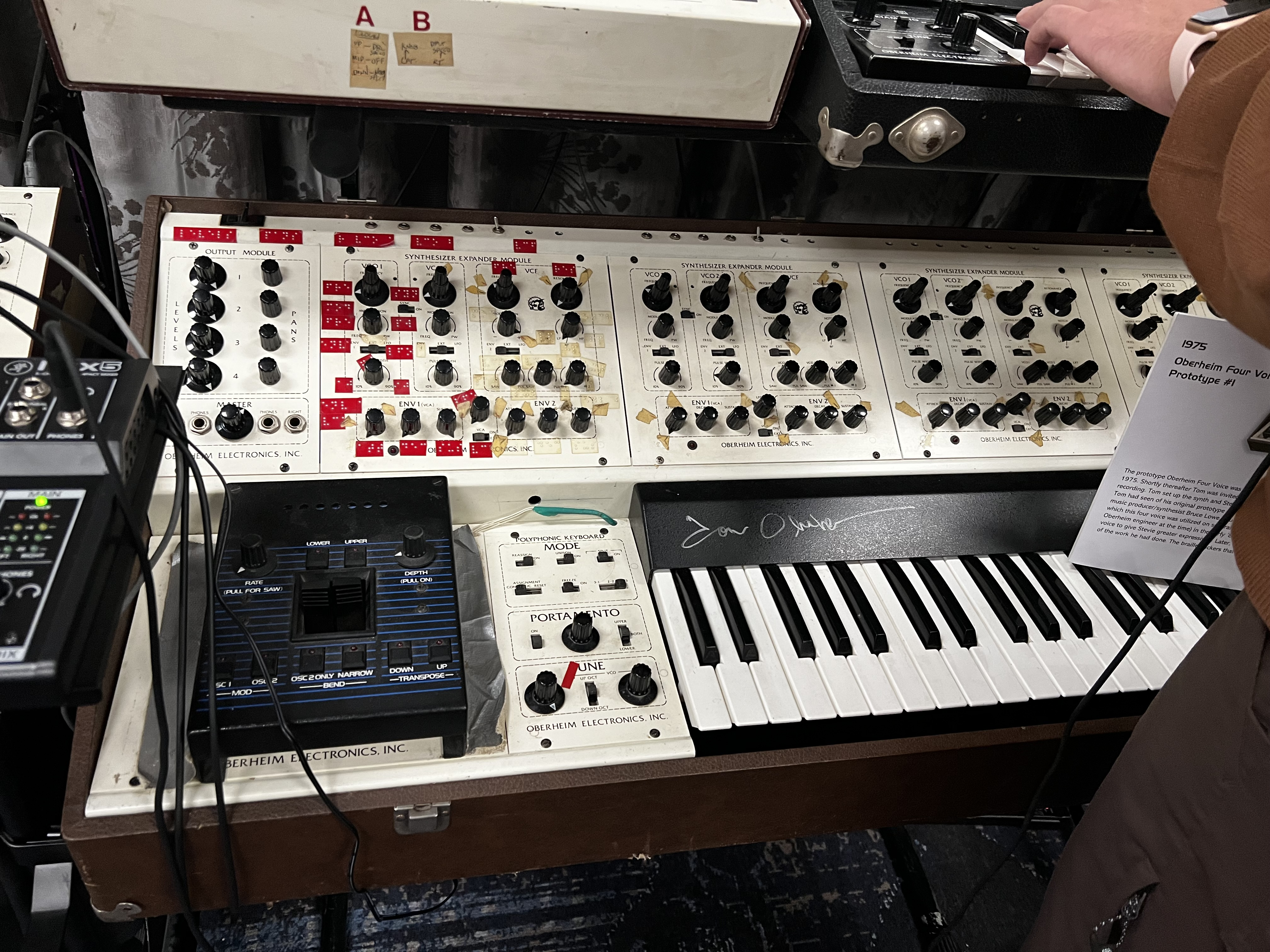
The first prototype of the Oberheim Four Voice synthesizer, as used by Wonder. The front panel still shows the braille labeling

In September 1970, at the age of 20, Wonder married Syreeta Wright, a songwriter and former Motown secretary. Wright and Wonder worked together on the next album, Where I'm Coming From (1971), Wonder writing the music, and Wright helping with the lyrics. Wonder and Wright wanted to "touch on the social problems of the world", and for the lyrics "to mean something". The album was released at around the same time as Marvin Gaye's What's Going On. As both albums had similar ambitions and themes, they have been compared; in a contemporaneous review by Vince Aletti in Rolling Stone, Gaye's was seen as successful, while Wonder's was seen as failing due to "self-indulgent and cluttered" production, "undistinguished" and "pretentious" lyrics, and an overall lack of unity and flow. Also in 1970, Wonder co-wrote (and played numerous instruments on) the hit "It's a Shame" for fellow Motown act the Spinners. His contribution was meant to be a showcase of his talent and thus a weapon in his ongoing negotiations with Gordy about creative autonomy. Reaching his 21st birthday on May 13, 1971, Wonder allowed his Motown contract to expire.

Around the release of Where I'm Coming From, Wonder became interested in synthesizers after hearing the album Zero Time by the electronic group Tonto's Expanding Head Band, which consisted of Robert Margouleff and Malcolm Cecil. He hired them as associate producers after meeting them in New York in May 1971. The trio quickly recorded a large amount of material, featuring a predominantly electronic sound due to the extensive use of Margouleff and Cecil's custom-built modular synthesizer, the TONTO synthesizer. The instrument combined several synthesizers, including the ARP 2600, Oberheim SEM, and the Moog. Wonder later reflected that "the synthesizer has allowed me to do a lot of things I've wanted to do for a long time but were not possible till it came along". He used the recordings as leverage in contract negotiations with Motown. The new contract, signed in July 1971, was unusually liberal by Motown standards and granted Wonder a higher royalty rate of 14%.

The first new material resulting from the collaboration was released in March 1972 on Music of My Mind. The album's lyrics addressed social and political issues alongside romantic themes. Critics praised the album, viewing it as a further step towards artistic maturity and self-expression. It peaked at No. 21 on the Billboard 200 and number six on the R&B chart. Two singles were released: "Superwoman (Where Were You When I Needed You)" in April and "Keep On Running" in August, which peaked at No. 33 and 90 on the Billboard Hot 100, respectively. Music of My Mind marked the beginning of a highly successful collaboration with Margouleff and Cecil as Wonder's associate producers, engineers, and synthesizer programmers: between 1972 and 1974, the trio recorded four albums together. Co-writer Yvonne Wright would also return on later projects. Wonder played as support act on The Rolling Stones's June–July American Tour 1972, helping his music cross over to white audiences.

The electronic sound continued on Talking Book, released in October 1972. Although much of the material was recorded during the same sessions as Music of My Mind, it is generally considered to showcase a more mature and introspective Stevie Wonder, and it was acclaimed by critics. The album featured the single "Superstition", which became Wonder's first number-one hit on the Hot 100 in a decade and is regarded as one of the most distinctive and famous examples of the sound of the Hohner Clavinet. The album also included "You Are the Sunshine of My Life", which likewise reached number one on the Hot 100. The two songs earned three Grammy Awards between them at the 1974 ceremony. The album was Wonder's most commercially successful to date, peaking at number three on the Billboard 200 and becoming his first album to reach the top of the R&B chart, where it remained for three weeks.

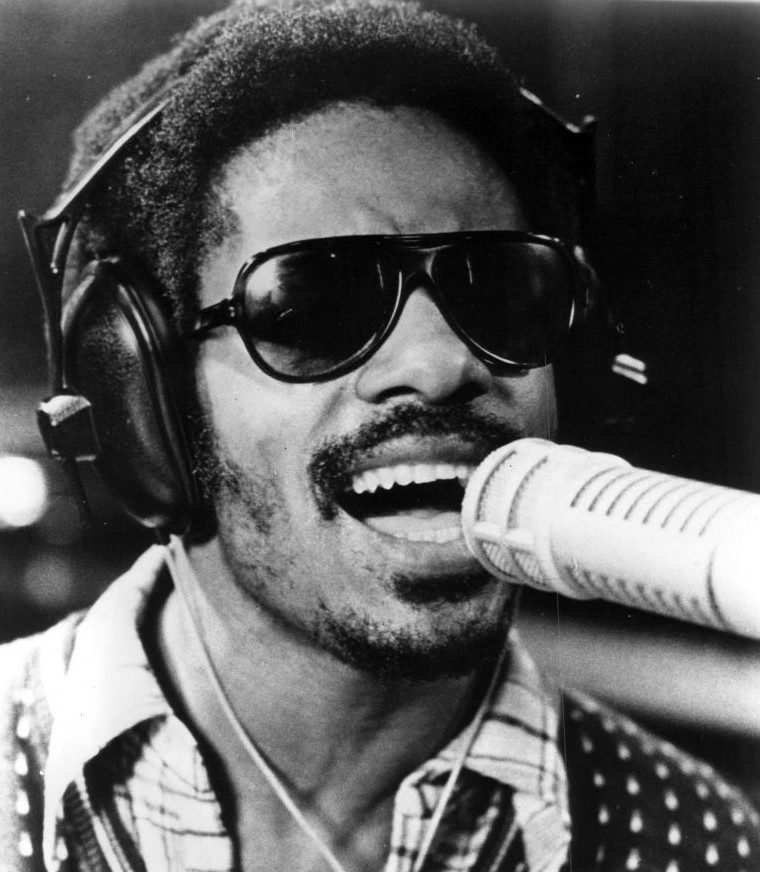
Wonder performing in 1973, during the early years of his "classic period"

Wonder's next album Innervisions, released in August 1973, featured "Higher Ground" (No. 4 on the pop charts) as well as the trenchant, racially conscious "Living for the City" (No. 8). Both songs reached No. 1 on the R&B charts. Popular ballads such as "Golden Lady" and "All in Love Is Fair" were also present, in a mixture of moods that nevertheless held together as a unified whole. Innervisions generated two more Grammy Awards at the 1974 ceremony: Best Engineered Recording – Non-Classical, presented to Cecil and Margouleff, and his first Album of the Year; at the ceremony the following year, he earned the award for Best R&B Song for "Living for the City". With Innervisions, Wonder became the most influential and acclaimed black musician of the early 1970s. The album is ranked No. 34 on Rolling Stone's 500 Greatest Albums of All Time.

On August 6, 1973, three days after the release of Innervisions, Wonder was seriously injured in an automobile accident while on tour in North Carolina. Being driven by his cousin John Harris in a rental Mercury Monarch sedan on the Interstate 85, the car hit the back of a flatbed farm truck, leaving Wonder with a fractured skull and a cerebral contusion. He was rushed to the hospital, where he lay in a coma for four days. The injury resulted in a partial loss of his sense of smell, a temporary loss of his sense of taste, and a bump on the forehead. He was transported to Los Angeles after two weeks for continued treatment before returning to New York in September. Despite orders from his doctor to refrain from performing, Wonder made a surprise appearance at an Elton John concert in Boston Garden on September 25, and in November played at a homecoming benefit for Shaw University in Raleigh, North Carolina. Shaw was facing financial difficulties, so Wonder, who was a member of the university's board of trustees, rallied other acts including Exuma, Labelle, and the Chambers Brothers to join the concert, which raised more than $10,000 for the school's scholarship fund.

Wonder embarked on a European tour in early 1974, performing in France at the Midem convention in Cannes, in England at the Rainbow Theatre in London, and on the German television show Musikladen. On his return to the United States, he played a sold-out concert at Madison Square Garden in March 1974, highlighting both up-tempo material and long, building improvisations on mid-tempo songs such as "Living for the City". The album Fulfillingness' First Finale appeared in July 1974 and set two hits high on the pop charts: the No. 1 "You Haven't Done Nothin'" and the Top Ten "Boogie On Reggae Woman". The Album of the Year was again one of three Grammys won.

The same year, Wonder took part in a Los Angeles jam session with ex-Beatles members John Lennon and Paul McCartney that would become known as the bootleg album A Toot and a Snore in '74. He also co-wrote and produced the 1974 Syreeta Wright album Stevie Wonder Presents: Syreeta.

On October 4, 1975, Wonder performed at the historic "Wonder Dream Concert" in Kingston, Jamaica, a benefit for the Jamaican Institute for the Blind. In 1975, he played harmonica on two tracks on Billy Preston's album It's My Pleasure.

By 1975, at the age of 25, Wonder had won two consecutive Grammy Awards: in 1974 for Innervisions and in 1975 for Fulfillingness' First Finale. In 1976, when Paul Simon won the Album of the Year Grammy for his Still Crazy After All These Years, he wryly noted: "I'd like to thank Stevie Wonder, who didn't make an album this year."

The double album-with-extra-EP, Songs in the Key of Life, was released in September 1976. Sprawling in style and sometimes lyrically difficult to fathom, the album was hard for some listeners to assimilate, yet is regarded by many as Wonder's crowning achievement and one of the most recognizable and accomplished albums in pop music history. The album became the first by an American artist to debut straight at No. 1 in the Billboard charts, where it stood for 14 non-consecutive weeks. Two tracks became No. 1 Pop/R&B hits: "I Wish" and "Sir Duke". The baby-celebratory "Isn't She Lovely" was written about his newborn daughter Aisha, while songs such as "Love's in Need of Love Today" and "Village Ghetto Land" reflected a far more pensive mood. Songs in the Key of Life won Album of the Year and two other Grammys. The album ranks 4th on Rolling Stone's 500 Greatest Albums of All Time.

Also in 1976, Wonder heard about the demonstration of the Kurzweil Reading Machine, the first multi-font reading machine for the blind, on The Today Show, and later became the user of the first production unit, beginning a long-term association between himself and Ray Kurzweil.

Until 1979's Stevie Wonder's Journey Through "The Secret Life of Plants", his only further 1970s release was the retrospective three-disc album Looking Back (1977), an anthology of his early Motown period.

=== 1980s: Increased cultural and political presence ===
The mainly instrumental soundtrack album Stevie Wonder's Journey Through "The Secret Life of Plants" (1979), was composed using an early music sampler called a Computer Music Melodian. It was also his first digital recording, and one of the earliest popular albums to use the technology, which Wonder used for all subsequent recordings. Wonder toured briefly with an orchestra in support of the album, and used a Fairlight CMI sampler onstage. In this year Wonder also wrote and produced the dance hit "Let's Get Serious", performed by Jermaine Jackson and ranked by Billboard as the No. 1 R&B single of 1980.

Hotter than July (1980) became Wonder's first platinum-certified album, (Note: During Wonder's early career, Motown wasn't a member of the Recording Industry Association of America until 1978, which led to a lot of Motown hit singles and albums to not be audited for a certification.) and its single "Happy Birthday" was a successful vehicle for his campaign to establish Martin Luther King Jr.'s birthday as a national holiday. The album also included "Master Blaster (Jammin')", "I Ain't Gonna Stand for It", and the sentimental ballad, "Lately".

In 1982, Wonder released a retrospective of his 1970s work with Stevie Wonder's Original Musiquarium, which included four new songs: the ten-minute funk classic "Do I Do" (which featured Dizzy Gillespie), "That Girl" (one of the year's biggest singles to chart on the R&B side), "Front Line", a narrative about a soldier in the Vietnam War that Wonder wrote and sang in the first person, and "Ribbon in the Sky", one of his many classic compositions. He also gained a No. 1 hit that year in collaboration with Paul McCartney in their paean to racial harmony, "Ebony and Ivory".

Also in 1982, Wonder invited inventor Raymond Kurzweil to his Los Angeles recording studio, Wonderland, and asked if "we could use the extraordinarily flexible computer control methods on the beautiful sounds of acoustic instruments?" In response, and with Wonder as musical advisor, Kurzweil founded Kurzweil Music Systems, which unveiled the Kurzweil K250 in 1984.

In 1983, Wonder performed the song "Stay Gold", the theme to Francis Ford Coppola's film adaptation of S. E. Hinton's novel The Outsiders. Wonder wrote the lyrics. In 1983, he scheduled an album to be entitled People Work, Human Play. The album never surfaced and instead 1984 saw the release of Wonder's soundtrack album for The Woman in Red. The lead single, "I Just Called to Say I Love You", was a No. 1 pop and R&B hit in both the United States and the United Kingdom, where it was placed 13th in the list of best-selling singles in the UK published in 2002. It went on to win an Academy award for best song in 1985. Wonder accepted the award in the name of Nelson Mandela and was subsequently banned from all South African radio by the Government of South Africa.

Incidentally, on the occasion of his 35th birthday, Stevie Wonder was honored by the United Nations Special Committee Against Apartheid for his stance against racism in South Africa that same year (1985). The album also featured a guest appearance by Dionne Warwick, singing the duet "It's You" with Stevie and a few songs of her own. Following the success of the album and its lead single, Wonder made an appearance on The Cosby Show, in the episode "A Touch of Wonder", where he demonstrated his ability to sample.

The following year's In Square Circle featured the No. 1 pop hit "Part-Time Lover". The album also has a Top 10 Hit with "Go Home". It also featured the ballad "Overjoyed", which was originally written for Journey Through "The Secret Life of Plants", but did not make the album. He performed "Overjoyed" on Saturday Night Live when he was the host. He was also featured in Chaka Khan's cover of Prince's "I Feel For You", alongside Melle Mel, playing his signature harmonica. In roughly the same period he was also featured on harmonica on Eurythmics' single "There Must Be an Angel (Playing with My Heart)" and Elton John's "I Guess That's Why They Call It the Blues".

Wonder was in a featured duet with Bruce Springsteen on the all-star charity single for African famine relief, "We Are the World", and he was part of another charity single the following year (1986), the AIDS-inspired "That's What Friends Are For". He played harmonica on the album Dreamland Express by John Denver in the song "If Ever", a song Wonder co-wrote with Stephanie Andrews; wrote the track "I Do Love You" for the Beach Boys' 1985 self-titled album; and played harmonica on "Can't Help Lovin' That Man" on The Broadway Album by Barbra Streisand.

In 1987, Wonder appeared on Michael Jackson's Bad album, on the duet "Just Good Friends". Jackson also sang a duet with him entitled "Get It" on Wonder's 1987 album Characters. This was a minor hit single, as were "Skeletons" and "You Will Know", both songs becoming his final number one R&B singles. Wonder played harmonica on a remake of his own song, "Have a Talk with God" (from Songs in the Key of Life in 1976), on Jon Gibson's album Body & Soul (1989).

=== 1990s: Jungle Fever and 1996 Olympics ===
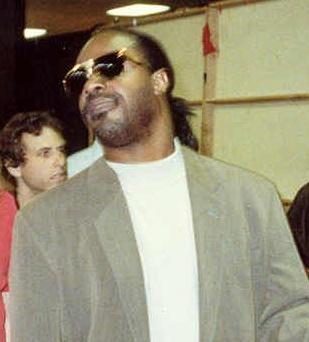
Wonder backstage at the 1990 Grammy Awards

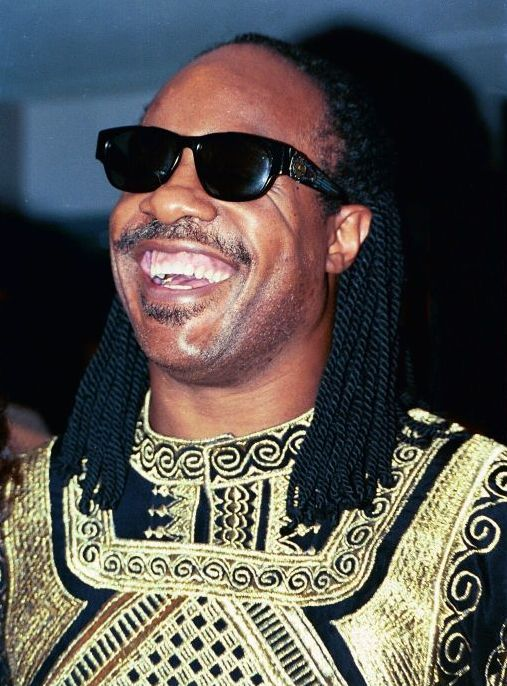
Wonder in 1994

Wonder continued to release new material, but at a slower pace. In 1990, he participated in Whitney Houston's album I'm Your Baby Tonight, contributing the duet "We Didn't Know", which reached the top 20 of the Billboard R&B chart. He recorded a soundtrack album for Spike Lee's film Jungle Fever in 1991. From this album, singles and videos were released for "Gotta Have You", "Fun Day" (remix only), "These Three Words" and "Jungle Fever". The B-side to the "Gotta Have You" single was "Feeding Off the Love of the Land", which was played during the end credits of the movie Jungle Fever but was not included on the soundtrack. A piano and vocal version of "Feeding Off the Love of the Land" was also released on the Nobody's Child: Romanian Angel Appeal compilation. Conversation Peace and the live album Natural Wonder were released in the 1990s.

In 1992, Wonder went to perform at Panafest, a new international festival of music held biennially in Ghana; it was during this trip that he composed many of the songs featured on Conversation Peace, and he would describe in a 1995 interview the powerful impact his visit to that country had on him: "I'd only been there for 18 hours when I decided I'd eventually move there permanently." In 1994, as co-chair of Panafest that year, he headlined a concert at the National Theatre in Accra, Ghana's capital city.

Among his other activities, Wonder played harmonica on the track "Deuce" (sung by Lenny Kravitz) for the 1994 tribute album Kiss My Ass: Classic Kiss Regrooved; sang at the 1996 Summer Olympics closing ceremony; collaborated in 1997 with Babyface on "How Come, How Long", a song about domestic violence that was nominated for a Grammy Award; and played harmonica on Sting's 1999 "Brand New Day". In early 1999, Wonder performed in the Super Bowl XXXIII halftime show.

In May 1999, Rutgers University presented Wonder with an honorary doctorate degree in fine arts. In December 1999, Wonder announced that he was interested in pursuing an intraocular retinal prosthesis to partially restore his sight.

=== Into the 21st century: Later career and collaborations ===
In 2000, Wonder contributed two new songs to the soundtrack for Spike Lee's Bamboozled album ("Misrepresented People" and "Some Years Ago"). Wonder continues to record and perform; though mainly occasional appearances and guest performances, he did do two tours, and released one album of new material, 2005's A Time to Love. In June 2006, Wonder made a guest appearance on Busta Rhymes' album The Big Bang, on the track "Been through the Storm". Wonder sings the refrain and plays the piano on the Dr. Dre- and Sha Money XL–produced track. Wonder appeared again on the last track of Snoop Dogg's 2006 album Tha Blue Carpet Treatment, "Conversations". The song is a remake of "Have a Talk with God" from Songs in the Key of Life. In 2006, Wonder staged a duet with Andrea Bocelli on the latter's album Amore, offering harmonica and additional vocals on "Canzoni Stonate". Wonder also performed at Washington, D.C.'s 2006 A Capitol Fourth celebration.

His other key appearances include performing at the opening ceremony of the 2002 Winter Paralympics in Salt Lake City, the 2005 Live 8 concert in Philadelphia, the pre-game show for Super Bowl XL in 2006, the Obama Inaugural Celebration in 2009, and the opening ceremony of the 2011 Special Olympics World Summer Games in Athens, Greece.

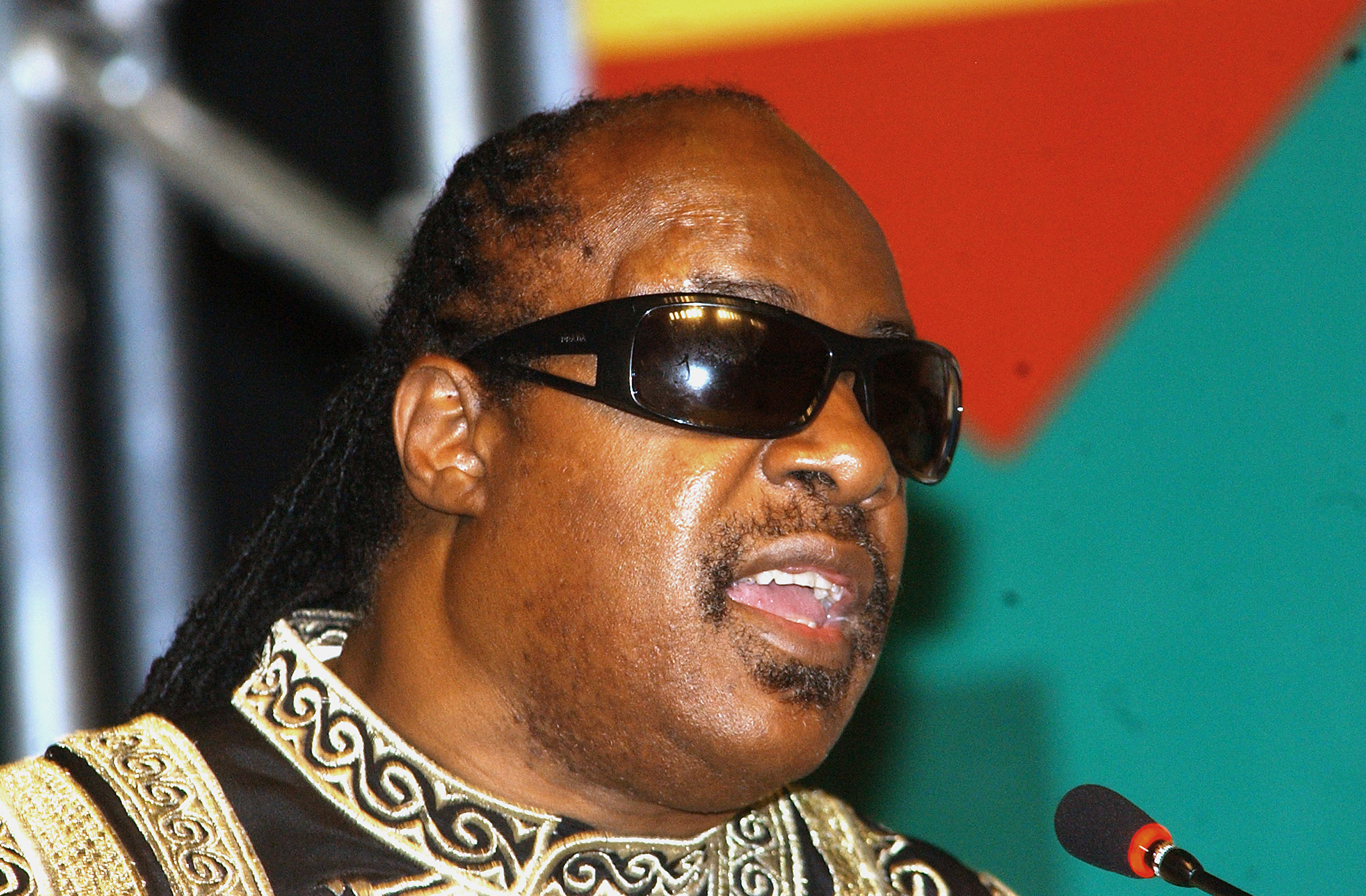
Wonder in 2006

Wonder's first new album in 10 years, A Time to Love, was released in October 2005 to lower sales than previous albums, and lukewarm reviews—most reviewers appearing frustrated at the end of the long delay to get an album that mainly copied the style of Wonder's "classic period" without doing anything new. The first single, "So What the Fuss", was released in April. A second single, "From the Bottom of My Heart", was a hit on adult-contemporary R&B radio. The album also featured a duet with India Arie on the title track "A Time to Love". In 2006, Wonder also recorded a duet with Tony Bennett, a rendition of "For Once in My Life", which earned them a Grammy Award for Best Pop Collaboration with Vocals.

Wonder did a 13-date tour of North America in 2007, starting in San Diego on August 23; this was his first U.S. tour in more than 10 years. On September 8, 2008, he started the European leg of his Wonder Summer's Night Tour, the first time he had toured Europe in more than a decade. His opening show was at the National Indoor Arena in Birmingham, in the English Midlands. During the tour, he played eight UK gigs; four at the O2 Arena in London (filmed in HD and subsequently released as a live-in-concert release on DVD and Blu-Ray, Live at Last), two in Birmingham and two at the M.E.N. Arena in Manchester. Wonder's other stop in the tour's European leg also found him performing in the Netherlands (Rotterdam), Sweden (Stockholm), Germany (Cologne, Mannheim and Munich), Norway (Hamar), France (Paris), Italy (Milan) and Denmark (Aalborg). Wonder also toured Australia (Perth, Adelaide, Melbourne, Sydney and Brisbane) and New Zealand (Christchurch, Auckland and New Plymouth) in October and November. His 2010 tour included a two-hour set at the Bonnaroo Music Festival in Manchester, Tennessee, a stop at the Hard Rock Calling festival in Hyde Park, London, and appearances at England's Glastonbury Festival, Rotterdam's North Sea Jazz Festival, a concert in Bergen, Norway, and a concert in Dublin, Ireland, at The O_{2} on June 24.

By June 2008, Wonder was working on two projects simultaneously: a new album called The Gospel Inspired by Lula and Through the Eyes of Wonder, an album he has described as a performance piece that will reflect his experience as a blind man. In October 2020, Wonder mentioned both Through the Eyes of Wonder and The Gospel Inspired by Lula as projects in development. None of the albums have yet been released.

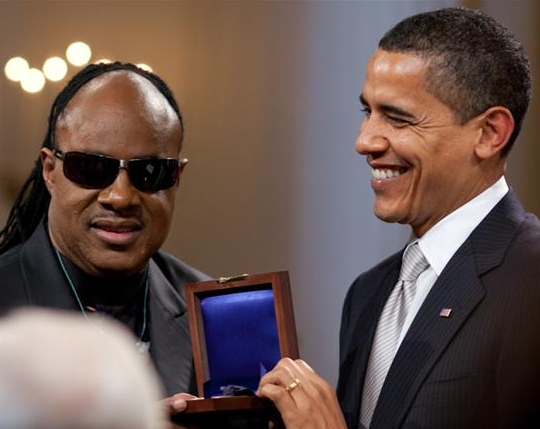
Barack Obama presenting Wonder with the Gershwin Prize in 2009

Wonder's harmonica playing can be heard on the 2009 Grammy-nominated "Never Give You Up", featuring CJ Hilton and Raphael Saadiq.

Wonder sang at the Michael Jackson memorial service in 2009, at Etta James's funeral, in 2012, a month later at Whitney Houston's memorial service, and at the funeral of Aretha Franklin in 2018.

In 2013, Wonder revealed that he had been recording new material for two albums, When the World Began and Ten Billion Hearts, in collaboration with producer David Foster. The albums have not seen release. Wonder appeared on singer Celine Dion's studio album Loved Me Back to Life (2013), performing a cover of his 1985 song "Overjoyed", and played harmonica on "Make It Look Good", a track from Mariah Carey's studio album Me. I Am Mariah... The Elusive Chanteuse (2014). He was also featured on two tracks on Mark Ronson's 2015 album Uptown Special, and the track "Stop Trying to Be God" on Travis Scott's 2018 album Astroworld.

In October 2020, Wonder announced that he had a new vanity label released via Republic Records, So What the Fuss Records, marking the first time his music was not released through Motown Records. The announcement was paired with the release of two singles: "Can't Put It in the Hands of Fate", a "socially-conscious" funk track, and "Where Is Our Love Song", whose proceeds will go towards the organization Feeding America.

In June 2021, Wonder appeared in the documentary Summer of Soul, directed by Ahmir "Questlove" Thompson, showing the Harlem Cultural Festival of 1969. In never-before-seen footage, a young 19-year-old Stevie Wonder is seen performing in front of thousands of people in Harlem. His performance shown in the documentary included "It's Your Thing" by the Isley Brothers and a drum solo. Wonder talks about the turning point made in his career during this time and how this helped him get out of being seen as just a child star. In September 2021, Wonder's duet with Elton John, "Finish Line", was released as a single.

In October 2022, Wonder celebrated his 50th anniversary of his project Talking Book.

On August 30, 2024, Wonder released his first new song in four years, "Can We Fix Our Nation's Broken Heart". On July 3, 2025, he headlined at the Lytham Festival, in Lytham St Annes, Lancashire, UK.

On September 28, 2026, for the 50th anniversary of Songs in the Key of Life, Wonder surprise released Songs in the Key of Life – The EP, consisting of four outtakes recorded during the album's sessions: "It's Easier", "My Story of Love", "I Can See the Sun in Late December" and "I'm Into Livin'". Wonder stated in a press release: "We didn't add these songs to the album, but they were part of what I was feeling and discovering as we made it. They bring me back to that time in my life, and now they get to become part of yours."

== Legacy ==
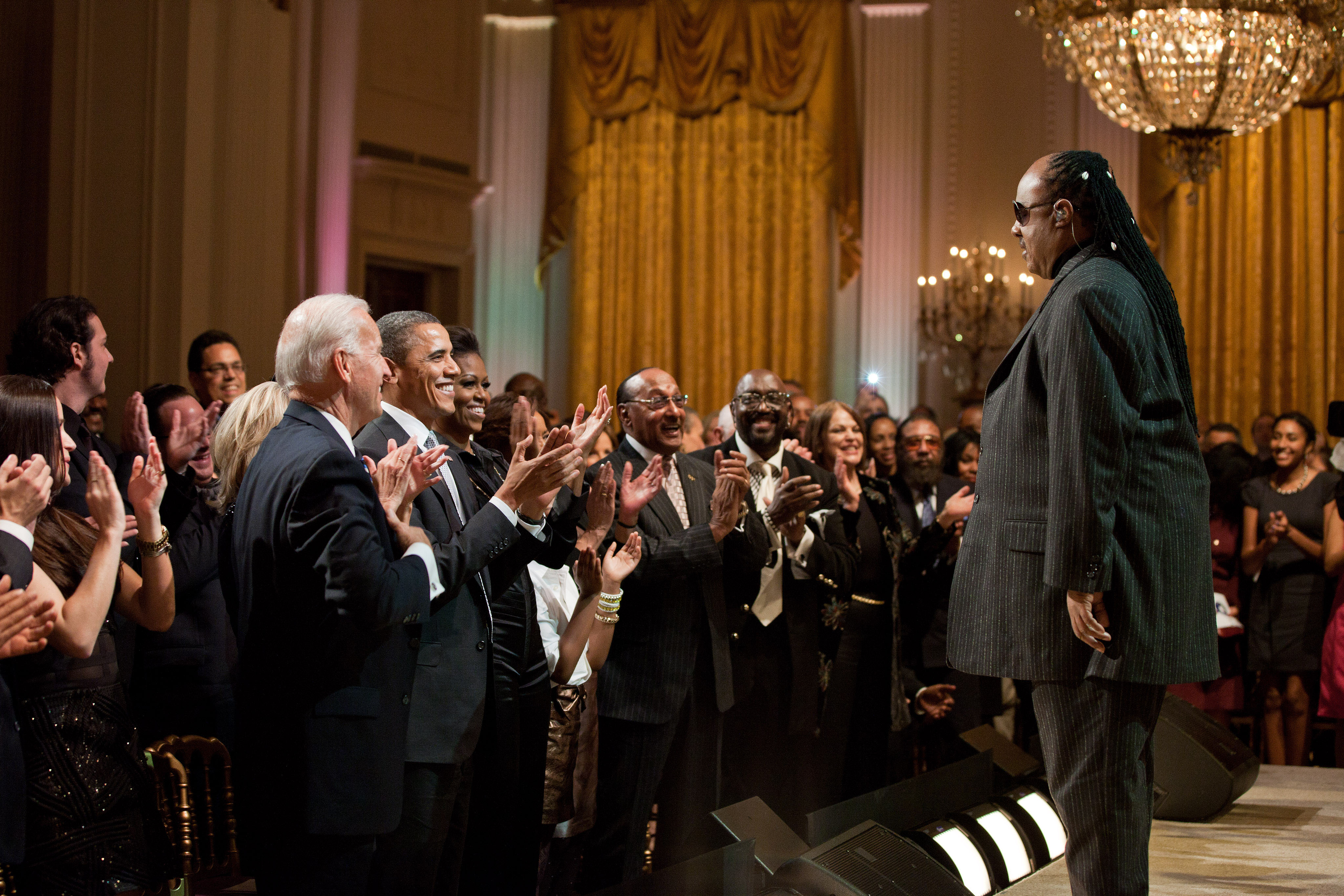
Wonder receiving a standing ovation in the East Room of the White House in 2011

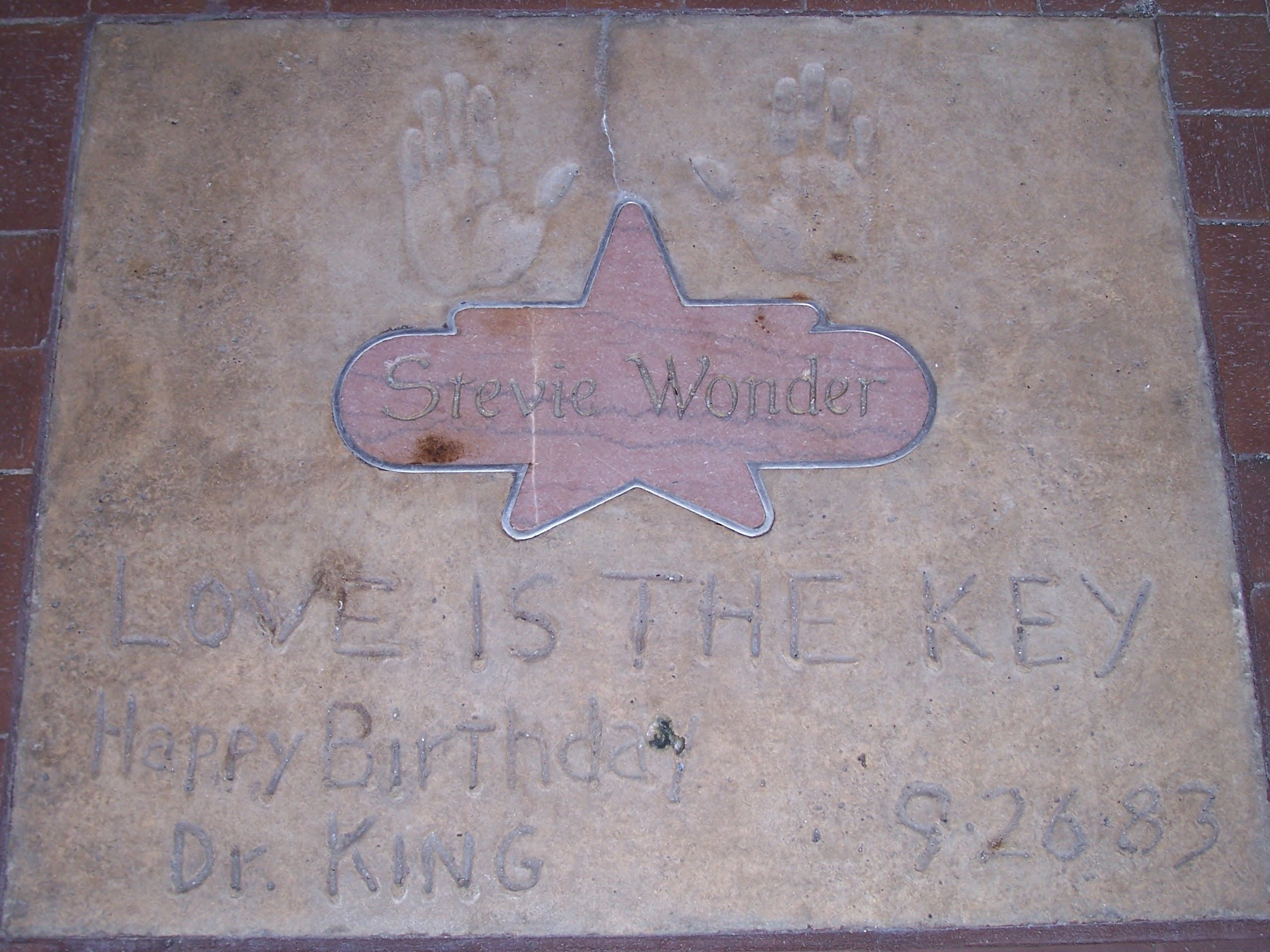
Handprint of Stevie Wonder with autograph: "LOVE IS THE KEY Happy Birthday Dr. King 9.26.83" Atlantic City Boardwalk, New Jersey, USA, 2006

Wonder is one of the most notable and influential popular music figures of the 20th century. He is one of the most successful songwriters and musicians. Virtually a one-man band during his peak years, his use of synthesizers and further electronic musical instruments during the 1970s helped expand the sound of R&B. He is also credited as one of the artists who helped drive R&B into the album era, by crafting his LPs as cohesive, consistent statements with complex sounds. His "classic period", which culminated in 1976, was marked by his funky keyboard style, personal control of production, and use of integrated series of songs to make concept albums. In 1979, Wonder used Computer Music Inc.'s early music sampler, the Melodian, on his soundtrack album Stevie Wonder's Journey Through "The Secret Life of Plants". This was his first digital recording and one of the earliest popular albums to use the technology, which Wonder used for all subsequent recordings.

Wonder recorded several critically acclaimed albums and hit singles, and wrote and produced songs for many of his label mates and outside artists. In his childhood, he was best known for his harmonica work, but today he is better known for his keyboard skills and vocal ability. He plays the piano, synthesizer, harmonica, congas, drums, bongos, organ, melodica, Clavinet, and harpejji. Wonder has been credited as a pioneer and influence to musicians of various genres, including pop, rhythm and blues, soul, funk and rock.

Wonder's "classic period" is generally agreed to be between 1972 and 1976. Some observers see aspects of 1971's Where I'm Coming From as certain indications of the beginning of Wonder's "classic period", such as its new funky keyboard style that Wonder used throughout the classic period. Some determine Wonder's first "classic" album to be 1972's Music of My Mind, on which he attained personal control of production, and on which he programmed a series of songs integrated with one another to make a concept album. Others skip over early 1972 and determine the beginning of the classic period to be in late 1972 with Talking Book, the album on which Wonder "hit his stride".

Let me put it this way: Wherever I go in the world, I always take a copy of Songs in the Key of Life. For me, it's the best album ever made, and I'm always left in awe after I listen to it. When people in decades and centuries to come talk about the history of music, they will talk about Louis Armstrong, Duke Ellington, Ray Charles and Stevie Wonder [...] he [Wonder] evolved into an amazing songwriter and a genuine musical force of nature. He's so multitalented that it's hard to pinpoint exactly what it is that makes him one of the greatest ever. But first, there's that voice. Along with Ray Charles, he's the greatest R&B singer who ever lived.

— Elton John

Wonder's albums during his "classic period" were considered very influential in the music world: the 1983 Rolling Stone Record Guide said they "pioneered stylistic approaches that helped to determine the shape of pop music for the next decade"; in 2005, American recording artist Kanye West said of his own work: "I'm not trying to compete with what's out there now. I'm really trying to compete with Innervisions and Songs in the Key of Life. It sounds musically blasphemous to say something like that, but why not set that as your bar?" Slate magazine's pop critic, Jack Hamilton, said: "Most Americans follow up their 21st birthdays with a hangover; Stevie Wonder opted for arguably the greatest sustained run of creativity in the history of popular music. Wonder's "classic period"—the polite phrase for when Stevie spent five years ferociously dunking on the entire history of popular music with the releases of Music of My Mind, Talking Book, Innervisions, Fulfillingness' First Finale, and Songs in the Key of Life [...] We've never heard anything like it since, and barring another reincarnation, we never will again."

The musicianship, the arranging. Stevie Wonder is the genius in our midst. You know, I'd put him pretty close to Bach.

— Errollyn Wallen, Master of the King's Music

Wonder has recorded more than 30 U.S. top-ten hits, including ten U.S. number-one hits on the pop charts, well as 20 R&B number-one hits. He has sold more than 100 million records, 19.5 million of which are albums; he is one of the top 60 best-selling music artists with combined sales of singles and albums. Wonder was the first Motown artist and second African-American musician to win an Academy Award for Best Original Song, which he won for his 1984 hit single "I Just Called to Say I Love You" from the movie The Woman in Red. Wonder won 25 Grammy Awards (the most won by a solo artist until 2012), as well as a Lifetime Achievement Award. His albums of the "classic period", Innervisions (1973), Fulfillingness' First Finale (1974) and Songs in the Key of Life (1976), all won the Grammy Award for Album of the Year, making him the tied-record holder for the most Album of the Year wins, with three. He is also the only artist to have won the award with three consecutive album releases. He has been inducted into the Rhythm and Blues Music Hall of Fame, Rock and Rock Hall of Fame and Songwriters Hall of Fame, and has received a star on the Hollywood Walk of Fame. He has also been awarded the Polar Music Prize. Rolling Stone named him the seventh greatest singer and fifteenth greatest artist of all time. In 2024, Neil McCormick of The Daily Telegraph ranked him the fifth greatest keyboard player of all time. In June 2009, he became the fourth artist to receive the Montreal Jazz Festival Spirit Award. In 2026, The New York Times named Wonder one of the "30 Greatest Living American Songwriters."

In 2003, Rolling Stone's "500 Greatest Albums of All Time" list included Innervisions at number 23, Songs in the Key of Life at number 56 (promoted to number 4 for the 2020 edition), Talking Book at number 90 (promoted to number 59 for the 2020 edition), and Music of My Mind at number 284. In 2004, on their "500 Greatest Songs of All Time" list, Rolling Stone included "Superstition" at number 74 (promoted to number 12 for the 2020 edition), "Living for the City" at number 104, "Higher Ground" at number 261 (promoted to number 113 for the 2020 edition), and "You Are the Sunshine of My Life" at number 281 (promoted to number 183 for the 2020 edition); additionally, "Signed, Sealed, Delivered (I'm Yours)" was included in the 2020 edition at number 203.

Wonder is also noted for his work as an activist for political causes, including his 1980 campaign to make Martin Luther King Jr.'s birthday a federal holiday in the United States. On October 21, 1974, with the Boston busing desegregation underway, Wonder spoke and led students in song at a lounge at the University of Massachusetts Boston the day after he performed at the Boston Garden.

== Personal life ==
=== Marriages and children ===
Wonder has been married three times. He was married to Motown singer-songwriter and frequent collaborator Syreeta Wright from 1970 until their amicable divorce in 1972, after which their musical collaboration continued (she sang on 1995's Conversation Peace). From 2001 until 2015, he was married to fashion designer Kai Millard. In October 2009, Wonder and Millard separated; Wonder filed for divorce in August 2012 and the divorce was finalized in 2015. In 2017, he married Tomeeka Bracy.

Wonder has nine children with five women. Two were born to Yolanda Simmons, whom Wonder met when she applied for a job as secretary for his publishing company. Simmons gave birth to Wonder's daughter Aisha Morris on February 2, 1975. After Aisha was born, Wonder said "she was the one thing that I needed in my life and in my music for a long time". Aisha was the inspiration for Wonder's "Isn't She Lovely?", a six-minute track on Songs in the Key of Life; it was an airplay-only hit, and Wonder refused to shorten the song for a single. Aisha is now a singer who has toured with her father and accompanied him on recordings, including his 2005 album A Time to Love. Wonder and Simmons also had a son, Keita, in 1977.

In 1983, Wonder had a son named Mumtaz Morris with Melody McCulley. Wonder also has a daughter, Sophia, and a son, Kwame, with a woman whose identity has not been publicly disclosed. Wonder has two sons with second wife, Kai Millard Morris. The elder is named Kailand, and he occasionally performs as a drummer on stage with his father. The younger son, Mandla Kadjay Carl Stevland Morris, was born on May 13, 2005 (his father's 55th birthday).

Wonder's ninth child, and his second with Tomeeka Robyn Bracy (their first was daughter Zaiah), was born in December 2014, amid rumors that he would be the father to triplets. This turned out not to be the case, and the couple named their new daughter Nia, meaning "purpose" (one of the seven principles of Kwanzaa).

=== Family and health ===
On May 31, 2006, Wonder's mother Lula Mae Hardaway died in Los Angeles at the age of 76. During his September 8, 2008, UK concert in Birmingham, he spoke of his decision to begin touring again following his loss: "I want to take all the pain that I feel and celebrate and turn it around."

At a concert in London's Hyde Park on July 6, 2019, Wonder announced that he would be undergoing a kidney transplant in September. The procedure was successfully performed in December 2019.

=== Religion and politics ===
Wonder has been a longtime Baptist affiliated with black churches. He was introduced to Transcendental Meditation through his marriage to Syreeta Wright. Consistent with that belief system, Wonder became vegetarian, and later a vegan, singing about it in October 2015 on The Late Late Show with James Corden during the show's "Carpool Karaoke" segment.

In 2013, Wonder announced that he would no longer perform in any region with a stand-your-ground law in effect following the acquittal of George Zimmerman for the killing of Trayvon Martin. Wonder additionally encouraged his fans to participate in similar boycotts, stating that "for those of you who've lost in the battle for justice, wherever that fits in any part of the world – we can't bring them back, What we can do is we can let our voices be heard. And we can vote in our various countries throughout the world for change and equality for everybody. That's what I know we can do."

Wonder joined Twitter on April 4, 2018, and his first tweet was a five-minute video honoring Martin Luther King Jr. Dozens of famous personalities were rounded up in the video, which was titled "The Dream Still Lives". Each person involved shared their dream, calling back to King's popular speech in 1963. Wonder's tweet went viral, and he also encouraged viewers to share their own videos about their dreams with the hashtag #DreamStillLives.

On August 21, 2024, Wonder performed "Higher Ground" at the 2024 Democratic National Convention, endorsing Vice President Kamala Harris in the 2024 United States presidential election. Wonder also briefly spoke at the convention, saying: "This is a moment to tell your children where you were and what you did. When we stand between history's pain and tomorrow's promises, we must choose courage over complacency."

=== Ghanaian citizenship ===
On May 13, 2024, Wonder's 74th birthday, Ghana's President Nana Akufo-Addo conferred Ghanaian citizenship on him. Wonder took the Oath of Allegiance and received his Certificate of Citizenship at Jubilee House in Accra.

== Awards and recognition ==
=== Grammy Awards ===
Wonder has won 25 Grammy Awards, as well as a Grammy Lifetime Achievement Award in 1996. He is one of only four artists and groups who have won the Grammy for Album of the Year three times as the main credited artist, along with Frank Sinatra, Paul Simon, and Taylor Swift. Wonder is the only artist to have won the award with three consecutive album releases.

Grammy Awards
Year	Award	Title
1973	Best Rhythm & Blues Song	"Superstition"
1973	Best R&B Vocal Performance, Male	"Superstition"
1973	Best Pop Vocal Performance, Male	"You Are the Sunshine of My Life"
1973	Album of the Year	Innervisions
1974	Best Rhythm & Blues Song	"Living for the City"
1974	Best Male R&B Vocal Performance	"Boogie on Reggae Woman"
1974	Best Male Pop Vocal Performance	Fulfillingness' First Finale
1974	Album of the Year	Fulfillingness' First Finale
1976	Best Male R&B Vocal Performance	"I Wish"
1976	Best Male Pop Vocal Performance	Songs in the Key of Life
1976	Best Producer of the Year*	N/A
1976	Album of the Year	Songs in the Key of Life
1985	Best Male R&B Vocal Performance	In Square Circle
1986	Best Pop Performance by a Duo Or Group With Vocal (awarded to Dionne Warwick, Elton John, Gladys Knight, and Wonder)	"That's What Friends Are For"
1995	Best Rhythm & Blues Song	"For Your Love"
1995	Best Male R&B Vocal Performance	"For Your Love"
1998	Best Instrumental Arrangement Accompanying Vocal(s) (awarded to Herbie Hancock, Robert Sadin, and Wonder)	"St. Louis Blues"
1998	Best Male R&B Vocal Performance	"St. Louis Blues"
2002	Best R&B Performance by a Duo Or Group With Vocals (awarded to Wonder and Take 6)	"Love's in Need of Love Today"
2005	Best Male Pop Vocal Performance	"From the Bottom of My Heart"
2005	Best R&B Performance by a Duo Or Group With Vocals (awarded to Beyoncé and Wonder)	"So Amazing"
2006	Best Pop Collaboration With Vocals (awarded to Tony Bennett and Wonder)	"For Once in My Life"
From 1965 to 1980 a self-produced artist received one Grammy Award as an artist and an additional one as a producer in the Record of the Year and Album of the Year categories

Year	Nominee / work	Award	Result
1967	"Uptight"	Best Rhythm & Blues Recording	Nominated
1967	"Uptight"	Best Rhythm & Blues Solo Vocal Performance, Male or Female	Nominated
1969	"For Once in My Life"	Best Rhythm & Blues Vocal Performance, Male	Nominated
1971	"Signed, Sealed, Delivered I'm Yours"	Best Rhythm & Blues Song	Nominated
1971	"Signed, Sealed, Delivered I'm Yours"	Best R&B Vocal Performance, Male	Nominated
1972	"We Can Work It Out"	Best R&B Vocal Performance, Male	Nominated
1974	"Superstition"	Best R&B Vocal Performance, Male	Won
1974	"Superstition"	Best Rhythm & Blues Song	Won
1974	"You Are the Sunshine of My Life"	Best Pop Vocal Performance, Male	Won
1974	"You Are the Sunshine of My Life"	Record of the Year	Nominated
1974	"You Are the Sunshine of My Life"	Song of the Year	Nominated
1974	Innervisions	Album of the Year	Won
1975	Fulfillingness' First Finale	Album of the Year	Won
1975	Fulfillingness' First Finale	Best Pop Vocal Performance, Male	Won
1975	"Boogie On Reggae Woman"	Best R&B Vocal Performance, Male	Won
1975	"Living for the City"	Best Rhythm & Blues Song	Won
1975	"Tell Me Something Good"	Best Rhythm & Blues Song	Nominated
1975	Stevie Wonder	Best Producer of the Year	Nominated
1977	Stevie Wonder	Best Producer of the Year	Won
1977	"Contusion"	Best Pop Instrumental Performance	Nominated
1977	"Contusion"	Best Instrumental Composition	Nominated
1977	"Have a Talk with God"	Best Inspirational Performance	Nominated
1977	Songs in the Key of Life	Album of the Year	Won
1977	Songs in the Key of Life	Best Pop Vocal Performance, Male	Won
1977	"I Wish"	Best R&B Vocal Performance, Male	Won
1981	"Master Blaster (Jammin')"	Best R&B Vocal Performance, Male	Nominated
1981	Stevie Wonder's Journey Through "The Secret Life of Plants"	Best Album of Original Score Written for a Motion Picture or a Television Special	Nominated
1981	Stevie Wonder	Producer of the Year (Non-Classical)	Nominated
1981	"Let's Get Serious"	Best Rhythm & Blues Song	Nominated
1983	"That Girl"	Best Rhythm & Blues Song	Nominated
1983	"Do I Do"	Best Rhythm & Blues Song	Nominated
1983	"Do I Do"	Best R&B Vocal Performance, Male	Nominated
1983	"Do I Do"	Best Instrumental Arrangement Accompanying Vocal(s)	Nominated
1983	"Ebony and Ivory"	Record of the Year	Nominated
1983	"Ebony and Ivory"	Best Pop Performance by a Duo or Group with Vocal	Nominated
1983	"What's That You're Doing"	Best R&B Performance by a Duo or Group with Vocal	Nominated
1985	"I Just Called to Say I Love You"	Song of the Year	Nominated
1985	"I Just Called to Say I Love You"	Best Pop Vocal Performance, Male	Nominated
1985	"I Just Called to Say I Love You (Instrumental)"	Best Pop Instrumental Performance	Nominated
1985	The Woman in Red	Best R&B Vocal Performance, Male	Nominated
1986	In Square Circle	Best R&B Vocal Performance, Male	Won
1986	"Part-Time Lover"	Best Pop Vocal Performance, Male	Nominated
1987	"That's What Friends Are For"	Best Pop Performance by a Duo or Group with Vocal	Won
1987	"That's What Friends Are For"	Record of the Year	Nominated
1988	"Skeletons"	Best Rhythm & Blues Song	Nominated
1988	"Skeletons"	Best R&B Vocal Performance, Male	Nominated
1989	Characters	Best R&B Vocal Performance, Male	Nominated
1992	"Gotta Have You"	Best R&B Vocal Performance, Male	Nominated
1992	"Gotta Have You"	Best Song Written Specifically for a Motion Picture or for Television	Nominated
1992	"Jungle Fever"	Best Song Written Specifically for a Motion Picture or for Television	Nominated
1996	"For Your Love"	Best Male R&B Vocal Performance	Won
1996	"For Your Love"	Best Rhythm & Blues Song	Won
1997	"Kiss Lonely Goodbye (Harmonica with Orchestra)"	Best Pop Instrumental Performance	Nominated
1998	"How Come, How Long"	Best Short Form Music Video	Nominated
1998	"How Come, How Long"	Best Pop Collaboration with Vocals	Nominated
1999	"How Come, How Long" (Live)	Best Pop Collaboration with Vocals	Nominated
1999	"St. Louis Blues"	Best Male R&B Vocal Performance	Won
1999	"St. Louis Blues"	Best Instrumental Arrangement Accompanying Vocal(s)	Won
2003	"Love's in Need of Love Today"	Best R&B Performance by a Duo or Group with Vocal	Won
2003	"Christmas Song"	Best Pop Collaboration with Vocals	Nominated
2005	"Moon River"	Best Pop Collaboration with Vocals	Nominated
2006	"A Time to Love"	Best Pop Collaboration with Vocals	Nominated
2006	A Time to Love	Best R&B Album	Nominated
2006	"So What the Fuss"	Best Male R&B Vocal Performance	Nominated
2006	"How Will I Know"	Best R&B Performance by a Duo or Group with Vocals	Nominated
2006	"So Amazing"	Best R&B Performance by a Duo or Group with Vocals	Won
2006	"From the Bottom of My Heart"	Best Male Pop Vocal Performance	Won
2007	"For Once in My Life"	Best Pop Collaboration with Vocals	Won
2009	"Never Give You Up"	Best R&B Performance by a Duo or Group with Vocals	Nominated
2010	"All About the Love Again"	Best Male Pop Vocal Performance	Nominated

=== Other awards and recognition ===
Wonder has been given a range of awards, both for his music and for his civil rights work, including a Lifetime Achievement Award from the National Civil Rights Museum, being named one of the United Nations Messengers of Peace, and earning a Presidential Medal of Freedom from President Barack Obama in 2014, presented at a ceremony in the White House on November 24 that year.

In December 2016, the City of Detroit recognized Wonder's legacy by renaming a portion of his childhood street, Milwaukee Avenue West, between Woodward Avenue and Brush Street, as "Stevie Wonder Avenue". He was also awarded an honorary key to the city, presented by Mayor Mike Duggan on the day of the unveiling of the new street sign.

In 2023, Wonder was awarded the Freedom of the City of Newcastle upon Tyne, England, conferred in recognition of his campaign to establish a U.S. national holiday for the birthday of Martin Luther King, Jr., who in November 1967 had received an honorary degree from Newcastle University.

In May 2024, Wonder was a recipient (alongside Misty Copeland) of the George Peabody Medal for Outstanding Contributions to Music and Dance in America, the highest honor awarded by the Peabody Institute of Johns Hopkins University.

Awards and recognition
- 1983: inducted to the Songwriters Hall of Fame.
- 1984: received an Academy Award for Best Song for "I Just Called to Say I Love You" from the movie The Woman in Red.
- 1989: inducted to the Rock and Roll Hall of Fame.
- 1994: Star on the Hollywood Walk of Fame.
- 1999: received the Polar Music Prize and Kennedy Center Honors.
- 2002: received the George and Ira Gershwin Lifetime Achievement Award at UCLA's Spring Sing. The same year, Wonder received the Sammy Cahn Lifetime Achievement Award from the Songwriters Hall of Fame.
- 2004: received the Billboard Century Award. Also in 2004, Rolling Stone ranked him No. 15 on their list of the 100 Greatest Rock and Roll Artists of All Time.
- 2006: was inducted, as one of the first inductees, into the Michigan Walk of Fame.
- 2006: Recipient of a Lifetime Achievement Award from the National Civil Rights Museum in Memphis.
- 2008: Ranked at number five on "The Billboard Hot 100 Top All-Time Artists", making him as the third most successful male artist in the history of Billboard Hot 100 chart.
- February 23, 2009: Recipient of the Library of Congress's second Gershwin Prize For Popular Song, honored by U.S. President Barack Obama at the White House.
- 2009: Recipient of the Montreal Jazz Festival Spirit Award. This special award underlines a popular artist's extraordinary contribution to the musical world. The Montreal Jazz Festival Spirit Award is in bronze.
- 2009: Named a Messenger of Peace by the United Nations.
- March 6, 2010: Appointed a Commander of the Order of Arts and Letters by French Culture Minister Frédéric Mitterrand. Wonder had been due to be invested with this honor in 1981, but scheduling problems prevented this from happening. A lifetime achievement award was also given to Wonder on the same day, at France's biggest music awards.
- June 2011: the Apollo Theater inducted Wonder into the Apollo Legends Hall of Fame.
- 2012: Recipient of the Billboard Icon Award.
- 2013: Received the Music Makes One Global Ambassador Award from the outstanding music award ceremony of Asia and the World, Mnet Asian Music Awards.
- 2014: Recipient of the Presidential Medal of Freedom.
- 2014: Recipient of ASCAP Centennial Award.
- 2016: Recipient of honorary key to Detroit, on the occasion of "Stevie Wonder Avenue" on the corner of the city's Milwaukee Avenue and Woodward Avenue.
- 2021: Founding inductee of the Black Music and Entertainment Walk of Fame.
- 2022: Recipient of the inaugural Icon Award from the Legal Defense Fund.
- 2023: Awarded the freedom of Newcastle, UK, "in recognition of his activism for social and political causes".
- 2025: Awarded an Honorary Fellowship from the Royal Welsh College of Music & Drama.

=== Honorary degrees ===
Stevie Wonder has received many honorary degrees in recognition of his music career. These include:

State	Date	School	Degree
Washington, D. C.	May 14, 1978	Howard University	Doctor of Humane Letters (DHL)
Louisiana	1986	Xavier University of Louisiana	Doctor of Humane Letters (DHL)
Providence, RI	1987	Brown University	Doctor of Music (DHL)
Alabama	June 2, 1996	University of Alabama at Birmingham	Doctor of Music (DMus.)
New Jersey	May 19, 1999	Rutgers University	Doctor of Fine Arts (DFA)
Ohio	April 30, 2010	Oberlin College	Doctor of Music (DMus.)
Louisiana	May 12, 2011	Tulane University	Doctor of Fine Arts (DFA)
Illinois	June 20, 2014	Northwestern University	Doctor of Arts (D.A.)
Georgia	May 15, 2016	Spelman College	Doctor of Humane Letters (DHL)
Connecticut	May 22, 2017	Yale University	Doctor of Music (DMus.)
Michigan	May 7, 2022	Wayne State University	Doctor of Humane Letters (DHL)
New York	May 20, 2023	Fordham University	Doctor of Humane Letters (DHL)
Missouri	May 5, 2024	Lincoln University	Doctor of Humane Letters (DHL)
Maryland	May 23, 2024	Johns Hopkins University	Doctor of Humane Letters (DHL)

== Discography ==
- The Jazz Soul of Little Stevie (1962)
- Tribute to Uncle Ray (1962)
- With a Song in My Heart (1963)
- Stevie at the Beach (1964)
- Up-Tight (1966)
- Down to Earth (1966)
- I Was Made to Love Her (1967)
- Someday at Christmas (1967)
- Eivets Rednow (1968)
- For Once in My Life (1968)
- My Cherie Amour (1969)
- Signed, Sealed & Delivered (1970)
- Where I'm Coming From (1971)
- Music of My Mind (1972)
- Talking Book (1972)
- Innervisions (1973)
- Fulfillingness' First Finale (1974)
- Songs in the Key of Life (1976)
- Stevie Wonder's Journey Through "The Secret Life of Plants" (1979, soundtrack)
- Hotter than July (1980)
- The Woman in Red (1984, soundtrack)
- In Square Circle (1985)
- Characters (1987)
- Jungle Fever (1991, soundtrack)
- Conversation Peace (1995)
- A Time to Love (2005)

== See also ==
- List of American Grammy Award winners and nominees
- List of Billboard Hot 100 chart achievements and milestones
- List of artists who reached number one on the Hot 100 (U.S.)
