= Dannii Minogue discography =

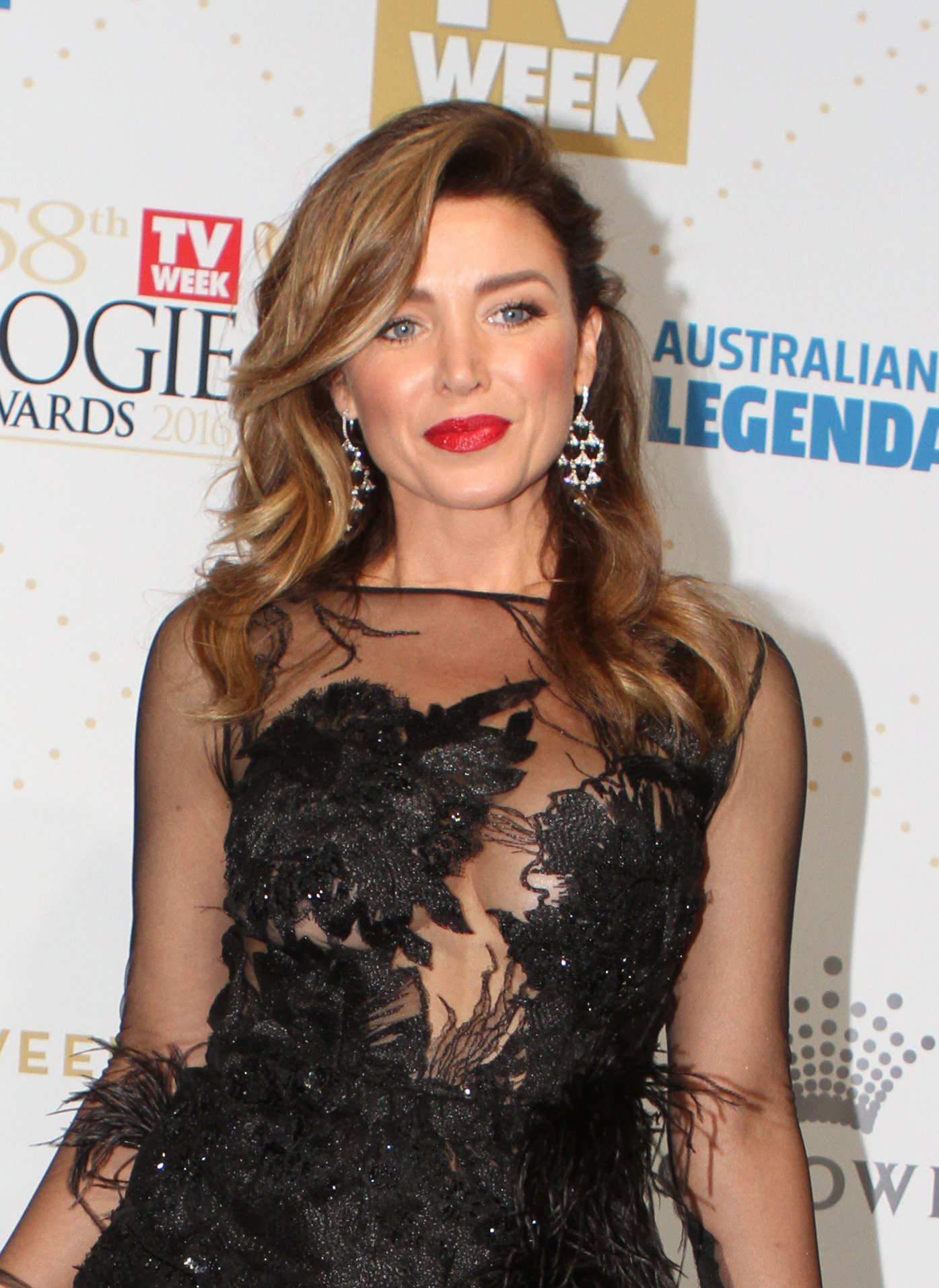
- Minogue at the Logie Awards of 2016 at the Crown Melbourne
- Studio albums: 5
- Compilation albums: 8
- Singles: 29
- Video albums: 5
- Music videos: 23
- Other appearances: 11

Australian singer Dannii Minogue has released five studio albums, eight compilation albums, twenty-eight singles, twenty-three music videos, and five video albums. Minogue rose to prominence in the early 1980s for her roles in the Australian television talent show Young Talent Time and in the soap opera Home and Away, before commencing her career as a pop singer in the early 1990s.

In Australia and the United Kingdom, Minogue achieved early success with singles such as "Love and Kisses" and "Success". Her debut studio album, Love and Kisses, was released in the UK in June 1991 and October 1990 in Australia. The album peaked at number eight on the UK Albums Chart and was certified gold by the British Phonographic Industry (BPI). However, by the time of the release of her second studio album, Get into You (1993), her popularity as a singer had declined.

The late 1990s saw Minogue reinvent herself as a dance artist with "All I Wanna Do", her first number-one UK dance hit. In 2001, Minogue returned to further musical success with the release of "Who Do You Love Now?" (a collaboration with Riva), while her subsequent album, Neon Nights, reached number eight in the UK. The album produced three singles, including "I Begin to Wonder", which reached number two in the UK.

Since 2007, Minogue's musical career has mainly been on hiatus. She has only released songs intermittently, and has instead focused on television presenting and her fashion label, Project D.

== Albums ==
=== Studio albums ===
List of studio albums, with selected chart positions and certifications
Title	Album details	Peak chart positions									Certifications
Title	Album details	AUS	FRA	GER	IRE	NL	JPN	SCO	UK	US Dance	Certifications
Dannii / Love and Kisses (Note: In Japan, the album was released as Party Jam.)	Released: 22 October 1990 (AUS) 3 June 1991 (UK); Label: Mushroom; Formats: CD, cassette, LP	24 (Note: A reissue of Love and Kisses containing additional remixes, titled Love and Kisses and..., reached number 98 in Australia in April 1992.)	—	—	—	—	—	—	8	—	BPI: Gold
Get into You	Released: 4 October 1993 (UK); Label: Mushroom, MCA; Formats: CD, cassette, LP	53	—	—	—	—	—	—	52	—	
Girl	Released: 8 September 1997 (UK); Label: Eternal; Formats: CD, cassette	69	—	—	—	—	—	21	57	—	
Neon Nights	Released: 17 March 2003; Label: London; Formats: CD, LP, digital download	17 (Note: Neon Nights peaked at number 25 upon release in 2003; it reached number 17 after its 20th anniversary edition was released in 2023.)	49	66	63	65	134	8	8	17	BPI: Gold
Club Disco	Released: 5 November 2007 (UK); Label: All Around the World; Formats: CD, digital download	—	—	—	—	—	—	—	— (Note: Club Disco did not enter the UK Albums Chart Top 100, but peaked at number 17 on the UK Albums Downloads Chart.)	—	

=== Compilation albums ===
List of compilation albums, with selected chart positions
Title	Album details	Peak chart positions		
Title	Album details	AUS	SCO	UK
U.K. Remixes	Released: 21 December 1991 (JPN); Labels: Mushroom, Alfa; Formats: CD, CS	—	—	—
The Singles	Released: 3 November 1998 (AUS); Label: Mushroom; Formats: CD, CS, DD	—	—	—
The Remixes	Released: 3 November 1998 (AUS); Label: Mushroom; Formats: CD, CS, DD	—	—	—
The Hits & Beyond	Released: 19 June 2006 (UK); Label: All Around the World; Formats: CD, CD/DVD, DD	67	21	17
Unleashed	Released: 5 November 2007 (AUS); Labels: Rhino, Warner; Formats: CD, DD	—	—	—
The Early Years	Released: 15 December 2008 (UK); Labels: Spectrum, Warner; Format: DD	—	—	—
The 1995 Sessions	Released: 7 December 2009 (UK); Labels: Palare, Cargo; Formats: CD, DD	—	—	—
This Is It: The Very Best Of	Released: 23 August 2013 (AUS); Label: Warner; Formats: CD, DD	80	—	—
Neon Nights Remixed	Released: 25 April 2025; Labels: London Records; Formats: CD, LP	—	89	— (Note: Neon Nights Remixed peaked at number 70 on the UK Physical Albums Chart and 6 on the UK Dance Albums Chart.)
"—" denotes items which were not released in that country or failed to chart.

== Singles ==
=== As lead artist ===
List of singles as lead artist, with selected chart positions and certifications, showing year released and album name
Title	Year	Peak chart positions										Certifications	Album
Title	Year	AUS	BEL	FRA	GER	IRE	ITA	NED	SPA	SWE	UK	Certifications	Album
"Love and Kisses"	1990	4	48	—	—	22	—	—	—	—	8	ARIA: Gold	Dannii / Love and Kisses
"Success"	1990	28	41	—	—	15	—	—	—	—	11		Dannii / Love and Kisses
"I Don't Wanna Take This Pain"	1990	92	—	—	—	—	—	—	—	—	40		Dannii / Love and Kisses
"Jump to the Beat"	1991	48	44	—	—	5	—	—	—	—	8		Dannii / Love and Kisses
"Baby Love"	1991	26	—	—	—	18	—	—	—	—	14		Dannii / Love and Kisses
"Show You the Way to Go"	1992	104	—	—	—	—	—	—	—	—	30		Get into You
"Love's on Every Corner"	1992	—	—	—	—	—	—	—	—	—	44		Get into You
"This Is It"	1993	13	—	—	—	17	—	—	—	—	10	ARIA: Gold	Get into You
"This Is the Way"	1993	45	—	—	—	—	—	—	—	—	27		Get into You
"Get into You"	1994	79	—	—	—	—	—	—	—	—	36		Get into You
"All I Wanna Do"	1997	11	20	—	—	—	—	—	—	48	4	ARIA: Gold	Girl
"Everything I Wanted"	1997	44	—	—	—	—	—	—	—	—	15		Girl
"Disremembrance"	1998	53	—	—	—	—	—	—	—	—	21		Girl
"Coconut"	1998	62	—	—	—	—	—	—	—	—	—		Girl
"Everlasting Night"	1999	42	—	—	—	—	—	—	—	—	—		Non-album single
"Put the Needle on It"	2002	11	29	—	72	20	—	30	—	—	7	ARIA: Gold	Neon Nights
"I Begin to Wonder"	2003	14	20	7	37 (Note: In Germany, the remix titled "Begin to Spin Me Around" vs Dead or Alive was the charting version.)	22	43	45	—	20	2	ARIA: Gold	Neon Nights
"Don't Wanna Lose This Feeling"	2003	22	39	40	—	38	—	66	—	—	5		Neon Nights
"You Won't Forget About Me" (versus Flower Power)	2004	20	37	55	—	22	12	—	17	—	7		Club Disco
"Perfection" (with Soul Seekerz)	2005	13	51	—	—	38	—	28	—	—	11		Club Disco
"So Under Pressure"	2006	16	—	—	—	31	—	—	—	—	20		Club Disco
"I Can't Sleep at Night"	2007	—	—	—	—	—	—	—	—	—	—		Club Disco
"He's the Greatest Dancer"	2007	37	—	—	—	—	—	—	9	—	—		Club Disco
"Touch Me Like That" (versus Jason Nevins)	2007	—	—	—	—	—	—	—	—	—	48		Club Disco
"Summer of Love"	2015	—	—	—	—	—	—	—	—	—	—		Non-album single
"100 Degrees" (with Kylie Minogue)	2015	—	—	—	—	—	—	—	—	—	— (Note: "100 Degrees" did not enter the UK Singles Chart, it peaked at number 2 on the UK Physical Singles Chart, and at number 1 on the UK Vinyl Singles Chart.)		Kylie Christmas
"Holding On" (featuring Jason Heerah)	2017	—	—	—	—	—	—	—	—	—	—		Non-album singles
"Galaxy"	2017	—	—	—	—	—	—	—	—	—	—		Non-album singles
"All I Wanna Do 2020"	2020	—	—	—	—	—	—	—	—	—	—		Non-album singles
"We Could Be the One"	2023	—	—	—	—	—	—	—	—	—	— (Note: "We Could Be the One" did not enter the UK Singles Chart, but peaked at number 5 on the UK Singles Downloads Chart.)		Non-album singles
"Thinking 'Bout Us" (with Autone)	2024	—	—	—	—	—	—	—	—	—	— (Note: "Thinking 'Bout Us" did not enter the UK Singles Chart, but peaked at number 23 on the UK Singles Downloads Chart)		Non-album singles
"Dirty Dirty Disco" (with Rogue Traders)	2026	—	—	—	—	—	—	—	—	—	— (Note: "Dirty Dirty Disco" did not enter the UK Singles Chart Top 100, but debuted at number 18 on the UK Singles Sales Chart.)		Non-album singles
"—" denotes a recording that did not chart or was not released in that territory.

- Minogue's singles were not released in the UK until 1991, with "I Don't Wanna Take This Pain" being released as the fifth single, not the third (as it was in Australia).

=== Featured artist ===
Title	Year	Peak chart positions										Certifications	Album
Title	Year	AUS	BEL	DEN	FIN	GER	IRE	NED	SWI	SWE	UK	Certifications	Album
"Rescue Me" (Eurogroove featuring Dannii Minogue)	1995	—	—	—	—	—	—	—	—	—	—		Eurogroove #03
"Boogie Woogie" (Eurogroove featuring Dannii Minogue)	1995	—	—	—	—	—	—	—	—	—	—		Eurogroove #03
"Who Do You Love Now?" (Riva featuring Dannii Minogue)	2001	15	10	13	14	14	20	26	35	25	3		Neon Nights
"—" denotes a title that did not chart, or was not released in that territory.

=== Promotional singles ===
List of promotional singles, showing year released and album name
Single	Year	Album
"Come and Get It" (J.C.A. featuring Dannii Minogue)	2004	Neon Nights
"Blame It on the Music" (Amyl Remix)	2023	Neon Nights 20

== Other appearances ==
List of other appearances, showing year released and album name
Title	Year	Album	Notes
"Material Girl"	1985	Now and Then	Recorded while appearing on Young Talent Time
"The Final Countdown"	1987	Phenomenon	Recorded while appearing on Young Talent Time
"Let's Go"	1987	Phenomenon	Recorded while appearing on Young Talent Time
"The Gift of Christmas"	1995	Non-album releases	Charity song for ChildLine
"Sex Dice"	2004	Non-album releases	Minogue performed backing vocals for Denise Lopez.
"Take Me Inside"	2004	Speck of Gold	Performed with Afterlife
"Trip"	2005	Departure Lounge: World Grooves	Performed with Thriller J
"I'll Be Home for Christmas"	2006	The Spirit of Christmas 2006	Available only in Myer department stores in Australia.
"The Winner Takes It All"	2008	Beautiful People Soundtrack	Performed with Kylie Minogue
"More, More, More" (Winter Chill mix)	2008	Hed Kandi: The Mix 2009	Another remix of the song appeared on Hed Kandi: The Remix 2011 (2010).
"Santa Claus Is Coming to Town"	2013	The Spirit of Christmas 2013	Performed with Ronan Keating
"That's How You Know"	2014	We Love Disney	Disney tribute album by Australian recording artists
"100 Degrees"	2015	Kylie Christmas	Performed with Kylie Minogue
"Sorrento Moon (I Remember)"	2017	Greatest Hits & Interpretations	Performed with Tina Arena

== Videography ==
=== Video albums ===
List of video albums, showing year released
Title	Album details
Love and Kisses: Video Collection	Released: 2 December 1992 (UK); Label: MCA (MCV#9009); Format: VHS
Get into You: Video Collection	Released: 30 May 1994 (UK); Label: Mushroom (V#81512); Format: VHS
The Videos	Released: April 1999 (AUS); Format: VHS
The Hits & Beyond	Released: 19 June 2006 (UK); Label: All Around the World (#9840362); Format: DVD
Dannii Minogue: The Video Collection	Released: 5 November 2007 (UK); Label: Rhino, Warner (#5051442456721); Format: DVD

=== Music videos ===
List of music videos as a lead artist, showing year released and director
Title	Year	Director(s)
"Love and Kisses" (Australian and UK version)	1990	Paul Goldman
"Success" (Australian and UK version)	1990	Paul Goldman
"Jump to the Beat"	1991	Paul Goldman
"Baby Love"	1991	Greg Masuak
"I Don't Wanna Take This Pain" (Australian (1990) and UK version)	1991	Paul Goldman
"Show You the Way to Go"	1992	Liam Kan
"Love's on Every Corner"	1992	Zowie Broach
"This Is It"	1993	Willi Smax
"This is the Way"	1993	Willi Smax
"Get into You"	1994	Kirsten Leigh
"All I Wanna Do"	1997	Paul Morgans
"Everything I Wanted"	1997	Steve Shaw
"Disremembrance"	1998	Joe Roman, Simon Cooper
"Everlasting Night"	1998	Simon Smith, Dannii Minogue, Gary Leeson
"Put the Needle on It"	2002	Mikka Lommi
"I Begin to Wonder"	2003	Phil Griffin
"Don't Wanna Lose This Feeling"	2003	Phil Griffin
"You Won't Forget About Me" (vs. Flower Power)	2004	Harvey & Carolyn
"Perfection" (and Soul Seekerz)	2005	Rob Kaplan
"So Under Pressure"	2006	Phil Griffin
"I Can't Sleep at Night"	2006	Ulf Buddensieck
"Touch Me Like That" (vs. Jason Nevins)	2007	Andy Soup
"Galaxy"	2017	Nick W Lord
"Thinking ‘Bout Us"	2024	Sean Higgins

List of music videos as a featured artist, showing year released and director
Title	Year	Director(s)
"Rescue Me" (EuroGroove featuring Dannii Minogue)	1995	Toshio Kitazumi
"Who Do You Love Now?" (Riva featuring Dannii Minogue)	2001	David Chaudoir
