= The Singles (Dannii Minogue album) =

The Singles / The Remixes

Compilation album by Dannii Minogue
- Released: 3 November 1998
- Recorded: 1990–1997
- Genre: Pop, dance
- Length: 60:07
- Label: Mushroom
- Producer: Dancin' Danny D; Alvin Moody; Vincent Bell; Les Adams; Emma Freilich; Andy Whitmore; Steve 'Silk' Hurly; Bruce Forest; Tim Lever; Mike Percy; Eliot Kennedy; Michael Ward; Brian Higgins; Matt Gray; Metro; Flexifinger

Dannii Minogue chronology
Girl (1997)	The Singles / The Remixes (1998)	Neon Nights (2003)

Professional ratings
Review scores
Source	Rating
AllMusic	4/5 stars

The Singles is a greatest hits compilation by Australian singer Dannii Minogue. It was released by Mushroom Records on 3 November 1998 in Australia only. The album features all fourteen of Minogue's singles released between 1990 and 1998. The tracklist opts for the original album versions of each song rather than their respective single versions, with the exceptions of "Jump to the Beat" and "Baby Love", which were not included on Minogue's original debut, Dannii but on its Australian re-issue Love and Kisses and.... The album includes the UK-only single "Love's on Every Corner" and the Australian-only single "Coconut", which was a hidden track on Girl. Since the compilation was a catalogue release, it was ineligible to chart on the Australian albums chart.

Simultaneously, a 2-CD remix compilation called The Remixes was also released. It features some previously vinyl exclusive 12" mixes and dub versions of the original tracks. It contains an altered track listing from the singles edition, which notably opts out "Love's On Every Corner" and "Coconut" thus being replaced by "Hallucination", a B-side to "Jump to the Beat".

The album artwork is identical between both versions except the titles, and was shot by photographer Steve Shaw.

== Track listing ==
The Singles
No.	Title	Writer(s)	Album	Length
1.	"Love and Kisses"	Alvin Moody	Dannii & Love and Kisses	3:44
2.	"Success"	Dannii Minogue; Moody	Dannii & Love and Kisses	5:34
3.	"Jump to the Beat" (L.A. 7" Mix)	Narada Michael Walden; Lisa Walden	Love and Kisses	3:36
4.	"Baby Love" (Silky 70's Edit)	Stephen Bray; Mary Kessler; Regina Richards	Love and Kisses	3:45
5.	"I Don't Wanna Take This Pain"	Vincent Bell; Eric Isles; Moody	Dannii & Love and Kisses	4:53
6.	"Show You the Way to Go"	Kenneth Gamble Leon A. Huff	Get into You	4:22
7.	"Love's on Every Corner"	D. Poku; Cathy Dennis; Paul Taylor	Get into You	4:15
8.	"This Is It"	Van McCoy	Get into You	3:40
9.	"This Is the Way"	Gary Baylis; Eliot Kennedy; Michael Ward	Get into You	3:59
10.	"Get into You"	Tracy Ackerman; Tim Lever; Mike Percy	Get into You	4:11
11.	"All I Wanna Do"	Brian Higgins; Stuart McLennan; Tim Powell; Matt Gray	Girl	4:30
12.	"Everything I Wanted"	Minogue; Mark Taylor; Steve Torch	Girl	4:40
13.	"Disremembrance"	David Green; Ian Masterson	Girl	4:07
14.	"Coconut"	Harry Nilsson	Girl	4:51
Total length:				60:07

The Remixes disc one
No.	Title	Writer(s)	Album	Length
1.	"Love and Kisses" (12" mix)	Moody	Dannii & Love and Kisses	5:54
2.	"Success" (Junior's Big House mix)	Minogue; Moody	Dannii & Love and Kisses	6:05
3.	"Jump to the Beat" (L.A. remix)	Narada Michael Walden; Lisa Walden	Love and Kisses	6:44
4.	"Baby Love" (Silky 70's mix)	Bray; Kessler; Richards	Love and Kisses	6:32
5.	"I Don't Wanna Take This Pain" (12" mix)	Bell; Isles; Moody	Dannii & Love and Kisses	6:02
6.	"Show You the Way to Go" (12" dub)	Gamble; Huff	Get into You	7:22
7.	"This Is It" (Dannii Got Murked mix)	McCoy	Get into You	6:14
Total length:				44:53

The Remixes disc two
No.	Title	Writer(s)	Album	Length
8.	"This Is the Way" (12" mix)	Baylis; Kennedy; Ward	Get into You	6:54
9.	"Get into You" (Arizona Club mix)	Ackerman; Lever; Percy	Get into You	6:00
10.	"All I Wanna Do" (Trouser Enthusiasts Toys of Desperation mix)	Higgins; McLennan; Powell; Gray	Girl	11:06
11.	"Everything I Wanted" (Xenomania 12" mix)	Minogue; Taylor; Torch	Girl	7:08
12.	"Disremembrance" (Trouser Enthusiasts Brittlestar Requiem mix)	Green; Masterson	Girl	12:17
13.	"Hallucination" (L.A. remix)	Andy Whitmore; Emma Freilich, Les Adams	Girl	5:59
Total length:				49:24

== Personnel ==
Adapted from the album liner notes.

- Dannii Minogue – vocals (all tracks), writer (track 2, 12)
- Alvin Moody – producer (track 1, 2), writer (track 1, 2, 5
- Andy Whitmore – producer (track 3, 4)
- Brian Higgins – producer, writer (track 11)
- Bruce Forest – additional producer, remix (track 2)
- Cathy Dennis – writer (track 7)
- Dancin' Danny D (D. Poku) – producer (track 7), additional producer, remix (track 1), mixer (track 7), writer (track 7)
- David Green – writer (track 13)
- DNA – producer (track 14)
- Eliot Kennedy – producer, writer (track 9)
- Emma Freilich – producer (track 3, 4, 5)
- Eric Isles – writer (track 5)
- Flexifinger – producer (track 13)
- Gary Baylis – writer (track 9)
- Harry Nilsson – writer (track 14)
- Ian Masterson – writer (track 13), producer (track 14)
- Kenneth Gamble – writer (track 6)
- Leon A. Huff – writer (track 6)
- Les Adams – producer (track 3, 4, 5)
- Lisa Walden – writer (track 3)
- Mark Taylor – writer (track 12)
- Mary Kessler – writer (track 4)
- Matt Gray – producer, writer (track 11)
- Metro – producer (track 12)
- Michael Ward – producer, writer (track 9)
- Mike Percy – producer (track 8, 10), writer (track 10)
- Narada Michael Walden – writer (track 3)
- Paul Taylor – writer (track 7)
- Phil Bodger – additional producer, remix (track 3)
- Phil Kelsey – additional producer, remix (track 8, 9)
- Regina Richards – writer (track 4)
- Stephen Bray – writer (track 4)
- Steve Shaw – photographer
- Steve 'Silk' Hurly – producer (track 6), additional producer (track 4), mixer (track 4, 6)
- Steve Torch – writer (track 12)
- Stuart McLennan – writer (track 11)
- Tim Lever – producer (track 8, 10), writer (track 10)
- Tim Powell – writer (track 11)
- Tracy Ackerman – writer (track 10)
- Van McCoy – writer (track 8)
- Vincent Bell – producer (track 1, 2), writer (track 5)

== Release history ==
Release dates and formats for The Singles
Region	Date	Format(s)	Distributor(s)	Ref(s).
Australia	3 November 1998	CD	Mushroom	
