= Dannii Minogue: The Video Collection =

Video by Dannii Minogue
- Released: 5 November 2007
- Genre: Dance-pop
- Length: 164 minutes
- Label: Warner Music Group

Dannii Minogue chronology
The Hits & Beyond (2006)	Dannii Minogue: The Video Collection (2007)

Dannii Minogue: The Video Collection is a DVD released by Australian singer Dannii Minogue. It was released on 5 November 2007 in the United Kingdom by Warner Music Group. The video album features music videos, live performances and previously unreleased footage.

== Track listing ==
Music videos

1. "Love and Kisses" (UK version)
2. "Success" (UK version)
3. "Jump to the Beat"
4. "Baby Love"
5. "I Don't Wanna Take This Pain" (UK version)
6. "Show You the Way to Go"
7. "Love's on Every Corner"
8. "This Is It"
9. "This Is the Way"
10. "Get into You"
11. "All I Wanna Do"
12. "Everything I Wanted"
13. "Disremembrance"
14. "Who Do You Love Now?"
15. "Put the Needle on It"
16. "I Begin to Wonder"
17. "Don't Wanna Lose This Feeling"
18. "You Won't Forget About Me"
19. "Perfection"
20. "So Under Pressure"

Bonus videos

1. "Rescue Me"
2. "Coconut"
3. "Everlasting Night"
4. "Live for the One I Love" (live)
5. "Begin to Spin Me Round"
6. "Don't Wanna Lose this Groove"
7. "I Can't Sleep at Night"
8. "He's the Greatest Dancer" (live on BBC's Children in Need)
9. "Kids" (live duet with Kylie Minogue)

Short films

1. "Put the Needle on It" (behind the scenes)
2. Neon Nights documentary
3. "I Begin to Wonder" (behind the scenes)
4. "You Won't Forget About Me" (behind the scenes)
