= The Videos (Dannii Minogue video) =

Video by Dannii Minogue
- Released: 12 April 1999
- Genre: Dance-pop
- Length: 56 minutes
- Label: Mushroom Records (V102050)

Dannii Minogue chronology
| Get into You: Video Collection (1994) | The Videos (1999) | The Hits & Beyond (2006) |

The Videos is a video album by Australian singer Dannii Minogue. It was released on 12 April 1999 by Mushroom Records in Australia. This was a budget release, released at the same time of The Singles and The Remixes. The video features all Minogue's promo music videos up to 1998.

== Track listing ==
1. "Love and Kisses"
2. "Success"
3. "Jump to the Beat"
4. "Baby Love"
5. "I Don't Wanna Take This Pain"
6. "Show You the Way to Go"
7. "Love's on Every Corner"
8. "This Is It"
9. "This is the Way"
10. "Get into You"
11. "All I Wanna Do"
12. "Everything I Wanted"
13. "Disremembrance"
14. "Everlasting Night"
