= This Is It: The Very Best Of =

Compilation album by Dannii Minogue
- Released: 23 August 2013
- Recorded: 1989–2010
- Studio: Various
- Genres: Pop; dance-pop
- Length: 79:38 (Australian CD); 90:40 (Australian digital download); 95:09 (UK digital download)
- Labels: Warner Music Australia; All Around the World
- Producer: Various

Dannii Minogue chronology
The 1995 Sessions (2009)	This Is It: The Very Best Of (2013)

This Is It: The Very Best Of is a compilation album by Australian singer Dannii Minogue released in 2013. Besides including singles from her five studio albums, the album boasts a cover of "The Winner Takes It All", recorded as a duet with Kylie Minogue in 2008 for the British sitcom Beautiful People soundtrack and "'Cos You're Beautiful", a new track Dannii recorded in 2010 with her X Factor protegee Ruth Lorenzo. The album noticeably includes the mashup remix of "Don't Wanna Lose This Feeling" with Madonna's 1985 single "Into the Groove" rather than its main single version.

The album was released to celebrate Minogue's debut on the Australian version of X Factor.

== Track listing ==
The Australian CD release features 21 tracks while the digital release features three extra singles, adding up to a total of 24 songs.

In the UK, the album was issued by All Around the World and features a previously unreleased mix of "Love's on Every Corner" as a further additional song, adding up to the total of 25 tracks.

This Is It: The Very Best Of track listing
No.	Title	Availability	Length
1.	"Love and Kisses" (Dancin' Danny D 7" Mix)		3:36
2.	"$ucce$$" (Bruce Forest 7" Mix)		3:41
3.	"Jump to the Beat" (L.A. 7" Mix)		3:37
4.	"Baby Love" (Silky 70's Edit)		3:42
5.	"I Don't Wanna Take This Pain" (L.A. 7" Edit)		3:24
6.	"Show You the Way to Go"		4:22
7.	"Love's on Every Corner" (Master Mix)	Digital (UK)	4:29
8.	"This Is It"		3:39
9.	"This Is the Way"	Digital (UK, AUS)	3:59
10.	"Get Into You" (original 7" radio edit)	Digital (UK, AUS)	3:40
11.	"All I Wanna Do"		4:29
12.	"Everything I Wanted" (Metro 7" Mix)		3:54
13.	"Disremembrance" (Flexifinger's Radio Edit)		4:04
14.	"Coconut"		4:49
15.	"Who Do You Love Now?" (Riva featuring Dannii Minogue)		3:24
16.	"Put the Needle on It"		3:24
17.	"I Begin to Wonder" (radio version)		3:28
18.	"Don't Wanna Lose This Groove" (radio version)		3:14
19.	"You Won't Forget About Me" (radio edit)		3:42
20.	"Perfection" (radio edit)		3:26
21.	"So Under Pressure" (radio edit)		3:21
22.	"He's the Greatest Dancer" (LMC Edit)		3:05
23.	"Touch Me Like That" (Dannii Minogue vs Jason Nevins)	Digital (UK, AUS)	3:23
24.	"The Winner Takes It All" (Dannii Minogue & Kylie Minogue with The BBC Concert Orchestra)		5:23
25.	"'Cos You're Beautiful" (with Ruth Lorenzo)		3:54
Total length:			95:09

== Charts ==
Chart performance for This Is It: The Very Best Of
Chart (2013)	Peak position
Australian Albums (ARIA)	80

== Release history ==
Release history and formats for This Is It: The Very Best Of
Region	Date	Label	Format(s)
Australia	23 August 2013	Warner Music Australia	CD, digital download
United Kingdom and Ireland	23 August 2013	All Around the World	Digital download
