= James Hamilton (DJ and journalist) =

British DJ and journalist

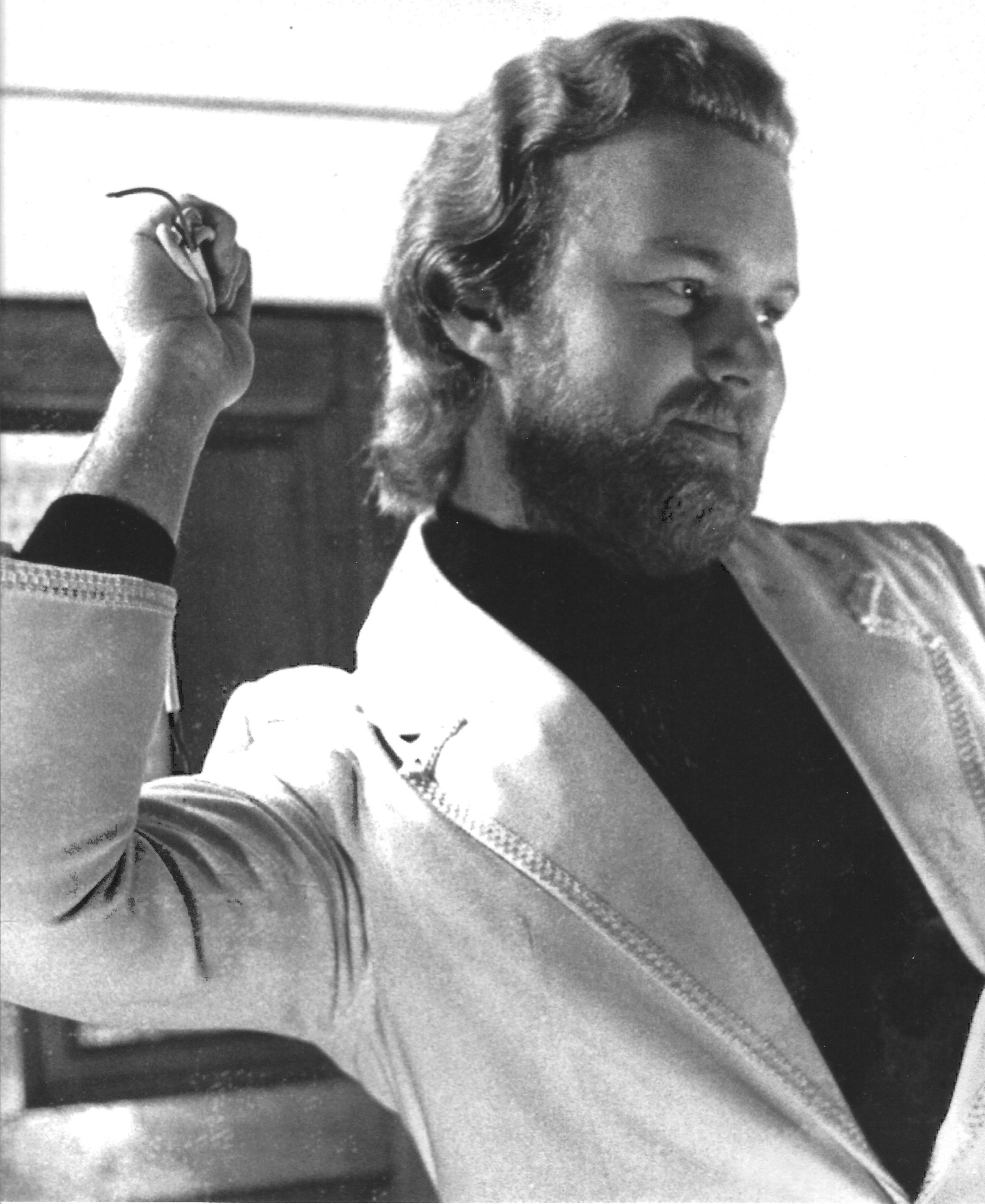
- Born: 21 April 1943; United Kingdom
- Died: 17 June 1996 (aged 53); Blyth, Nottinghamshire
- Occupations: DJ; music critic; music journalist

James John Ware Hamilton (21 April 1943 – 17 June 1996) was a British DJ and dance music columnist for Record Mirror, and later for Music Week, where he worked until his death in 1996. He is recognised as a pioneering advocate of disco mixing in the UK and the addition of beats per minute (bpm) calculations to record reviews.

== Career ==
Hamilton started as a DJ in his early 20s, playing rhythm & blues in nightclubs in London. He then headed to New York to work for Seltaeb, the US company who had acquired the merchandising rights for the Beatles, becoming a talent scout for their newly formed music division. After returning to the UK, he adopted the DJ name Doctor Soul, and also compiled an album with this title for Sue Records. He set up as one of the first mobile DJs, and began writing US reviews for Record Mirror in January 1969. In June 1975, he began the magazine's weekly ‘Disco’ column, named James Hamilton's Disco Page. He pioneered several features that were copied by other dance music based publications, like a club chart calculated on returns from disco and club DJs, as well as Hot Vinyl reviews of import and promotional records. In January 1979, he introduced another innovation by giving beats per minute (bpm) calculations of record tempos, thus helping working DJs catch up with the new American innovation of mixing and blending records together. In the 1980s he, with Les Adams of L.A. Mix, made New Year's Eve mix shows on Capital Radio. The show continued until 1994. In April 1991, his column became a part of Music Week's RM Dance Update.

Hamilton's 'jittery stuttering, hi hat driven, throbbing 120–130bpm' style of writing was loved throughout the music industry. His reviews were regarded with almost biblical zeal by the DJ fraternity, many of whom would buy records sight unseen on the basis of his reviews.

== Media about Hamilton ==
A podcast, Who Was James Hamilton? was uploaded to Mixcloud in November 2024 in advance of James Hamilton's Disco Pages 1975-1982, a hardback book published December 9th 2024, which compiles his Record Mirror columns during this period. Edited by Mike Atkinson, it includes introductions by Norman Cook and Greg Wilson. A second hardback book, James Hamilton's Dance Pages 1983-1989, was published on December 15th 2025, with introductions by Pete Tong and Greg Wilson. A monthly podcast series based around James Hamilton's charts and reviews, Record Mirror Disco Charts, has been running since January 2025.

== Personal life and demise ==
Hamilton died on 17 June 1996 at age 53 in Blyth, Nottinghamshire, due to colon cancer. DJ, music producer and radio presenter Pete Tong said after his death, "No-one has ever got close to him in terms of respect as a journalist. I think the reason he had authority was that because he'd been around for so long, he was drawing on such a wealth of knowledge that even if you didn't agree with what he said you had to respect his opinion."
