= Dannii (album) =

Studio album by Dannii Minogue
- Released: 22 October 1990
- Genre: Pop; freestyle
- Length: 50:16
- Label: Mushroom
- Producer: Alvin Moody; Vincent Bell; Andy Whitmore; Emma Freilich; Les Adams; Dancin' Danny D

Dannii Minogue chronology
Dannii (1990)	Love and Kisses (1991)

Singles from Love and Kisses
- 1. "Love and Kisses" Released: February 1990; 2. "Success" Released: 3 September 1990; 3. "I Don't Wanna Take This Pain" Released: November 1990

Professional ratings
Review scores
Source	Rating
AllMusic	3/5 stars

Dannii is the original debut album by the Australian singer Dannii Minogue. It was released by Mushroom Records in October 1990 for the Australian market only. The album was released in Japan by Alpha Records in April 1991 for the Japanese market under the title Party Jam, and later released in the European and again in the Japan market with a slightly altered track listing, and entitled Love and Kisses.

== Track listing ==
No.	Title	Writer(s)	Length
1.	"Party Jam"	Vincent Bell, Eric Isles, Alvin Moody	4:58
2.	"Call to Your Heart"	Tony Adderly, Moody	6:00
3.	"So Hard to Forget"	Trevor Gale, Kenni Hairston	5:15
4.	"Love and Kisses" (Original mix)	Moody	3:44
5.	"Work"	Bell, Isles, Moody	4:26
6.	"Love Traffic"	Kylie Minogue, Moody	5:59
7.	"Success" (Original mix)	Dannii Minogue, Moody	5:32
8.	"I Don't Wanna Take This Pain"	Bell, Isles, Moody	4:51
9.	"Attitude"	Moody	5:08
10.	"True Lovers" (Original mix)	Bell, Moody	4:23
Total length:			50:16

Notes

- "Love and Kisses" (Dancin' Danny D 7" Mix) is used on the Japan release.

== Chart performance ==
Chart performance for Dannii
Chart (1990)	Peak position
Australian Albums (ARIA)	24

== Release history ==
Release history and formats for Dannii
Country	Release date	Format	Cat. no.
Australia	October 1990	CD	TVD93333
Australia	October 1990	Vinyl	TVT93333
Australia	October 1990	Cassette	TVC93333
