= Love and Kisses (Dannii Minogue album) =

1991 debut studio album by Dannii Minogue

Studio album by Dannii Minogue
- Released: 3 June 1991
- Recorded: 1989–1991
- Length: 55:21
- Labels: MCA; Mushroom; Savage
- Producers: Alvin Moody; Vincent Bell; Andy Whitmore; Emma Freilich; Les Adams; Dancin' Danny D

Dannii Minogue chronology
Dannii (1990)	Love and Kisses (1991)	U.K. Remixes (1991)

Singles from Love and Kisses
- 1. "Jump to the Beat" Released: 15 July 1991; 2. "Baby Love" Released: 7 October 1991

Professional ratings
Review scores
Source	Rating
AllMusic	link
NME	7/10

Love and Kisses is the first international album by the Australian singer Dannii Minogue. It was released by MCA Records on 3 June 1991, in the United Kingdom. The album, featuring artwork shot by Simon Fowler, serves as the international issue of Minogue's original Australian debut album, Dannii, with two additional recordings and new mixes. In November 1991, the album was reissued worldwide, including Australia, as Love and Kisses and... with additional remixes. In August 1991, the album was certified Gold in the UK, and its reissue has sold more than 75,000 units. The album was reissued again in 2009 featuring B-sides and remixes.

== Reception ==
American magazine Cashbox designated the record their 'Debut Pick of the Week' stating that album was "reminiscent of early Madonna."

Billboard noted that "Kylie's little sister bows with an engaging collection of pop/dance ditties. Tracks like "Success," "I Don't Want To Take This Pain," and the title tune surround her chirpy voice with contagious beats and melodies that should sound just dandy on top 40 radio. Already a huge star in her Australian homeland and throughout Europe, Minogue has the charisma to woo stateside punters in no time flat."

In a retrospective write-up from AllMusic, John Lucas gave the album a mixed review, commenting that "her voice is as strong as her sister's, if not stronger, although it has a slight nasal quality that can make her phrasing a little difficult to distinguish... The title track is an entertaining piece of fluff, but it has dated badly, particularly the cringe-worthy rap section. Second single "Success" is even worse... However, "Baby Love" is a genuinely credible early-'90s house number that benefited from a number of highly popular remixes, signaling the direction Dannii's career would take in the late '90s and into the 21st century... Other tracks are largely forgettable filler. Love and Kisses is a somewhat entertaining collection of early-'90s pop music."

== Track listing ==
=== Standard edition ===
No.	Title	Writer(s)	Length
1.	"Love and Kisses" (Dancin' Danny D 7" Mix)	Alvin Moody	3:37
2.	"$ucce$$" (Bruce Forest 7" Mix)	Dannii Minogue, Moody	3:40
3.	"So Hard to Forget"	Trevor Gale, Kenni Hairston	5:14
4.	"Party Jam" (Edit)	Vincent Bell, Eric Isles, Moody	3:35
5.	"Attitude"	Moody	5:08
6.	"Work"	Bell, Isles, Moody	4:26
7.	"Jump to the Beat"	Narada Michael Walden, Lisa Walden	4:04
8.	"Call to Your Heart" (Edit)	Tony Adderly, Moody	5:32
9.	"I Don't Wanna Take This Pain"	Bell, Isles, Moody	4:51
10.	"Love Traffic"	Kylie Minogue, Moody	5:59
11.	"Baby Love"	Stephen Bray, Mary Kessler, Regina Richards	4:41
12.	"True Lovers" (Dancin' Danny D 7" Mix)	Bell, Moody	4:34
Total length:			55:21

=== Love and Kisses and... ===
Reissued in December 1991, this version features the single mix of "Baby Love" and a re-recorded version of "I Don't Wanna Take This Pain" and four extended 12" mixes.

No.	Title	Writer(s)	Length
1.	"Love and Kisses" (Dancin' Danny D 7" Mix)	Alvin Moody	3:27
2.	"$ucce$$" (Bruce Forest 7" Remix)	Dannii Minogue, Moody	3:40
3.	"So Hard to Forget"	Trevor Gale, Kenni Hairston	5:14
4.	"Party Jam" (Edit)	Vincent Bell, Eric Isles, Moody	3:35
5.	"Attitude"	Moody	5:08
6.	"Work"	Bell, Isles, Moody	4:26
7.	"Baby Love" (Silky's 70s Edit)	Stephen Bray, Mary Kessler, Regina Richards	3:43
8.	"Call to Your Heart" (Edit)	Tony Adderly, Moody	5:32
9.	"Jump to the Beat"	Narada Michael Walden, Lisa Walden	4:04
10.	"Love Traffic"	Kylie Minogue, Moody	5:59
11.	"I Don't Wanna Take This Pain" (L.A. Master Mix)	Bell, Isles, Moody	3:57
12.	"True Lovers" (Dancin' Danny D 7" Mix)	Bell, Moody	4:34
13.	"Baby Love" (Silky 70's 12")	Bray, Kessler, Richards	6:20
14.	"$ucce$$" (12" version)	D. Minogue, Moody	7:03
15.	"Love and Kisses" (12" version)	Moody	5:53
16.	"Jump to the Beat" (12" version)	N. M. Walden, L. Walden	6:30
Total length:			79:05

=== Deluxe edition (2009) ===
Remastered edition issued by Palare Records on 7 December 2009, includes the full album plus B-side, "Hallucination".

Disc one
No.	Title	Writer(s)	Length
1.	"Love and Kisses" (Dancin' Danny D 7" Mix)	Alvin Moody	3:35
2.	"$ucce$$" (Bruce Forest 7" Remix)	Dannii Minogue, Moody	3:41
3.	"So Hard to Forget"	Trevor Gale, Kenni Hairston	5:13
4.	"Party Jam" (Edit)	Vincent Bell, Eric Isles, Moody	3:35
5.	"Attitude"	Moody	5:07
6.	"Work"	Bell, Isles, Moody	4:26
7.	"Jump to the Beat"	Narada Michael Walden, Lisa Walden	4:04
8.	"Call to Your Heart" (Edit)	Tony Adderly, Moody	5:31
9.	"I Don't Wanna Take This Pain" (L.A. Master Mix)	Bell, Isles, Moody	3:58
10.	"Love Traffic"	Kylie Minogue, Moody	5:59
11.	"Baby Love"	Stephen Bray, Mary Kessler, Regina Richards	4:41
12.	"True Lovers" (Dancin' Danny D 7" Mix)	Bell, Moody	4:33
13.	"Hallucination"	Andy Whitmore, Emma Freilich, Les Adams	6:00
14.	"Jump to the Beat" (L.A 7" Mix)	N. M. Walden, L. Walden	3:40
15.	"Baby Love" (Silky 70's Edit)	Bray, Kessler, Richards	3:45
16.	"Party Jam" (Bruce Forest 7" Mix)	Bell, Isles, Moody	4:54
Total length:			72:42

Disc two
No.	Title	Writer(s)	Length
1.	"Love and Kisses" (12" Mix)	Moody	6:16
2.	"$ucce$$" (12" version)	D. Minogue, Moody	7:25
3.	"Jump to the Beat" (12" Mix)	N. M. Walden, L. Walden	6:44
4.	"Baby Love" (Silky 70's 12")	Bray, Kessler, Richards	6:21
5.	"I Don't Wanna Take This Pain" (L.A. 12" Mix)	Bell, Isles, Moody	6:07
6.	"True Lovers" (12")	Bell, Moody	9:28
7.	"Love and Kisses" (House Mix)	Moody	7:38
8.	"$ucce$$" (Expensive Mix)	D. Minogue, Moody	7:45
9.	"Baby Love" (E-Smooves 12" Mix)	Bray, Kessler, Richards	6:41
10.	"$ucce$$" (Junior's Big House Mix)	D. Minogue, Moody	6:05
11.	"Baby Love" (Maurice's Love Dub)	Bray, Kessler, Richards	6:29
Total length:			76:59

== Charts ==
=== Weekly charts ===
Weekly chart performance for Love and Kisses
Chart (1991)	Peak position
UK Albums (Official Charts)	8
European Albums (Music & Media)	40

Weekly chart performance for Love and Kisses and...
Chart (1992)	Peak position
Australian Albums (ARIA)	98

=== Year-end charts ===
1991 year-end chart performance for Love and Kisses
Chart (1991)	Position
UK Albums (OCC)	90

== Certifications ==
Certifications for Love and Kisses
Region	Certification	Certified units/sales
United Kingdom (BPI)	Gold	100,000^{^}
^{^} Shipments figures based on certification alone.

== Release history ==
Release history for Love and Kisses
Country	Release date	Format	Cat. no.
United Kingdom	June 1991	CD	MCAD10496
Japan	June 1991	Cassette	MCC10340
Japan	1991	CD	ALCB-352
Taiwan	1991	CD	MCD10340
United States	1991	CD	MCAD10467
United Kingdom	7 December 2009	Deluxe CD	PALARE003CD

== Love and Kisses: Video Collection ==
A collection of music videos produced to promote the album's singles was released on 2 December 1992 by MCA Records. The VHS reached number 23 on the UK video chart.

=== Track listing ===
1. "Jump to the Beat"
2. "Love and Kisses"
3. "I Don't Wanna Take This Pain"
4. "$ucce$$"
5. "Baby Love"
6. Interview and Home and Away footage
