= It's Not Just Saturday =

- Genre: Music
- Presented by: Gareth Jones; Dannii Minogue
- Country of origin: United Kingdom
- Original language: English
- No. of series: 1
- No. of episodes: 16

Production
- Running time: 35–65 minutes (inc. adverts)
- Production company: Scottish Television

Original release
- Network: ITV
- Release: 6 January – 27 April 1996

It's Not Just Saturday is a magazine programme aimed at teenagers which was broadcast on Saturday mornings on ITV during the winter and spring of 1996. It was the companion piece to Telegantic Megavision, though produced by a separate production team (Scottish Television), and with no direct connection to the sibling show, aside from the fact that CITV would often run trailers for the shows together. The programme was presented by Gareth Jones (who had previously hosted the Saturday morning show Get Fresh under the name Gaz Top) with Dannii Minogue.

The show featured music, studio guests and chat, viewer interaction and competitions. Some parents were unhappy with the irreverent and sometimes cheeky nature of the humour, and complaints were made to ITV and broadcasting watchdogs about the programme's content and style. It was originally a 65-minute programme (10.25-11.30, including breaks), sitting between Telegantic Megavision and The Chart Show in ITV's Saturday schedule; however, part-way through its run, the programme was cut to 35 minutes (10.55-11.30) with the 10.25-10.55 section replaced by a repeat run of the Thames Television-produced children's sitcom Spatz.

On one occasion prior to the reduction (in early February), INJS failed to appear on screen at all, and was replaced by an episode of US drama series seaQuest DSV. The magazine show returned the following week. The reason for the one-week disappearance of the show is unclear: it may have been due to disruption caused by the 1996 Docklands bombing which had occurred the day before (and had led to GMTV replacing their own children's programmes with news output), though this has never been confirmed or proven.
