= The 1995 Sessions =

Compilation album by Dannii Minogue
- Released: 7 December 2009
- Recorded: 1994–1995
- Genres: Dance-pop; disco; house
- Length: 50:31
- Label: Palare

Dannii Minogue chronology
The Early Years (2008)	The 1995 Sessions (2009)	This Is It: The Very Best Of (2013)

Professional ratings
Review scores
Source	Rating
Digital Spy	4/5 stars
The Times	3/5 stars

The 1995 Sessions is a 2009 compilation album consisting of previously unreleased demo tracks previously recorded by Australian singer Dannii Minogue fourteen years earlier. It was released by Palare on 7 December 2009. The album consists of rare and previously unheard songs recorded for what would have been Minogue's then third studio album.

== Album history ==
Minogue began writing and recording her third studio album in early 1994. The completed album, however, was never released following the termination of her recording contract with Mushroom Records who did not take up their option to release it. Dannii had parted ways with UK label MCA Records in late 1993.

In July 1995, the official fanclub magazine confirmed a 20-track demo tape, listing the producers of the album as being Love to Infinity, Ollie J, DNA, One World, The Rapino Brothers, Terry Ronald and Jazzie B and remixes as having been commissioned for the lead track. The edition confirms that two of the new tracks ("Free Your Love" and "Everlasting Night") had been performed at Birmingham's subway city club and (shown on L!VE TV), G-A-Y and again at London Pride 1995.

In October 2009, Minogue announced that the previously unreleased recordings would be remastered and commercially released. The album was originally scheduled to be released in the United Kingdom on 23 November 2009, but was pushed to a 7 December release.

A draft track list of the album was published by online retailers before the listing was finalised. This listing featured a song titled "I Got This Feeling" (written and produced by the UK based dance music team Love to Infinity), however, when the final track list appeared, this track was no longer included. In its place appeared two tracks; "Take My Time Loving You" and the original version of "Coconut". "I Got This Feeling" was removed by Minogue as the original master was damaged and an updated mix of the song would not blend in the collection of material.

Two previously released Japanese only singles recorded during these sessions with Japanese dance music act Eurogroove, "Rescue Me" and "Boogie Woogie", were not included on the album. This was due to confusion over worldwide ownership of the recordings outside of Japan.

== Track listing ==
The 1995 Sessions track listing
No.	Title	Writer(s)	Producer(s)	Length
1.	"Free Your Love"	Graziano Mallozzi; Marco Sabiu; Terry Ronald; Dannii Minogue	The Rapino Brothers	3:40
2.	"Skin Deep"	Oliver Jacobs; Phillip Jacobs; Mark Walcott; Minogue	Ollie J	3:13
3.	"Love and Affection"	Peter Fallon; Michael Fallon; Barry James	Michael & Peter Fallon	3:37
4.	"Let Love into Your Life"	Greg Parratto; Billy Pace	Tom Fredericks	4:07
5.	"Everlasting Night" (original version)	Mike Percy; Tim Lever; Minogue; Ronald	One World	4:01
6.	"Crazy (For Your Love)"	Biddu Appaiah; Simon Stirling	One World	3:27
7.	"Take My Time Loving You"	Percy; Lever; Minogue	One World	3:31
8.	"Love in Me"	Mallozzi; Sabiu; Barry Blue	The Rapino Brothers	3:36
9.	"Exclusively"	O. Jacobs; P. Jacobs; Walcott; Glen Goldsmith; Minogue	Ollie J	2:27
10.	"Love Will Find a Way"	Ronald; Charlie Mole	Ronald; Mole	4:21
11.	"Don't Wanna Leave You Now"	Ronald; Mole; Minogue	Ronald; Mole	4:47
12.	"Coconut" (original version)	Harry Nilsson	DNA	4:10
13.	"Free Your Love" (extended mix)	Mallozzi; Sabiu; Ronald; Minogue	The Rapino Brothers	5:34
Total length:				50:31

== Release history ==
Release history and formats for The 1995 Sessions
Region	Date	Label	Format(s)	Catalog
United Kingdom and Ireland	7 December 2009	Palare	CD; digital download	PALARE005CD
