= Regina (American singer) =

American singer

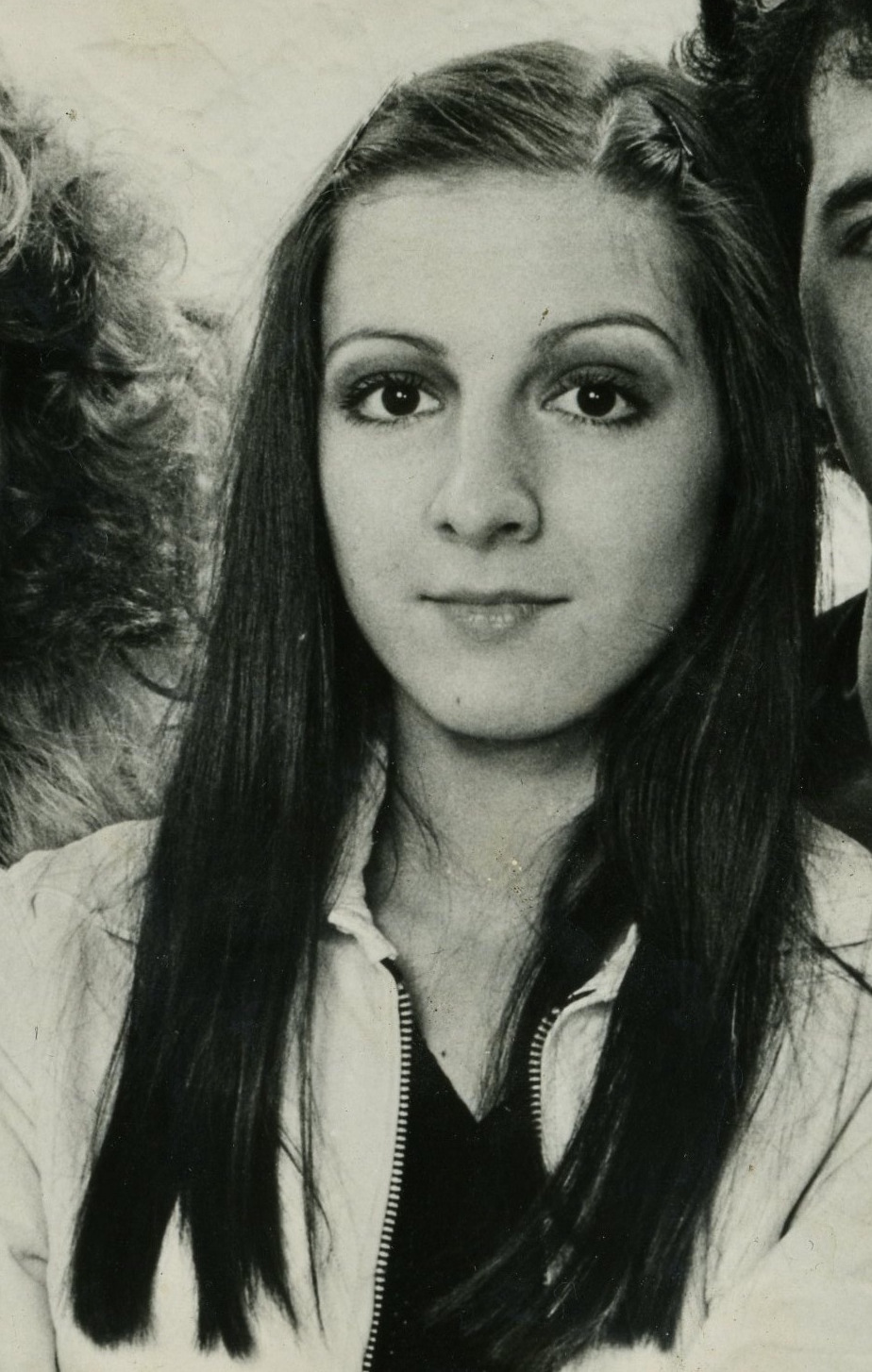
- Regina in 1980

Background information
- Also known as: Regina Lee
- Born: Regina Marie Cuttita; Brooklyn, New York, U.S.
- Genres: Pop; dance; R&B; funk; rock
- Occupation: Singer
- Years active: 1978–1993
- Labels: A&M; Atlantic; Funkin' Marvellous; Centurion
- Formerly of: Regina Richards and Red Hot

Regina Marie Cuttita, also known as Regina Richards or simply Regina, is an American singer born in Brooklyn, New York. She began her career in the late 1970s as the frontwoman of the new wave band Regina Richards and Red Hot. She is perhaps best known for the hit single "Baby Love", which reached number 10 on the Billboard Hot 100 in 1986. "Baby Love" was her only song to chart on the Hot 100, making her a one-hit wonder. The song also reached number 50 on the UK Singles Chart that same year.

== Career ==
Regina, who majored in theater at Marymount Manhattan College, began her music career in the late 1970s, recording and performing with the new wave band Regina Richards and Red Hot. The band regularly played New York City music venues such as CBGB, Max's Kansas City, and Irving Plaza. With the help of Richard Gottehrer, the band signed with A&M Records. The first single released was titled "Tyger", with "Tug of War" as the B-side. The second single "Don't Want You Back", with "Company Girl" as the B-side, was followed by a self-titled album; the records did not attain mainstream success. Subsequently, she dissolved the group and focused on writing songs for other artists and helping them record demos with Stephen Bray, her former Red Hot drummer. One of the artists who approached them was Madonna, who was trying to secure a recording deal at the time; Regina helped Madonna with vocal harmonies on her demos.

In 1986, Regina and Bray co-wrote "Baby Love", initially planning on selling it to Madonna or another artist. Her record label, Atlantic Records, however, requested that Regina sing the song herself. The single reached #10 on the Billboard Hot 100 that year and was included on Regina's Curiosity album, which also included "Say Goodbye", a song she had originally written with Kenny Rogers in mind. Another song from the album appeared on the Hot Dance Music/Club Play chart that year: "Beat of Love". Music publications of the time often commented on perceived similarities to Madonna, and called her the "queen of the wanna-bes".

In 1987, she appeared in an anti-drug public service announcement with McGruff the Crime Dog that aired well into the 1990s. In 1988, Regina released the song "Extraordinary Love". It reached #11 on the Hot Dance Music/Club Play chart. In 1990, no longer with Atlantic, she released her final single "Track You Down". Plans to release an album titled Best Kept Secret the same year were shelved indefinitely.

In 1991, Australian singer Dannii Minogue released a cover of "Baby Love" as a single, reaching number 14 on the UK Singles Chart.

== Discography ==
=== With Red Hot ===
- Regina Richards and Red Hot (1981)

=== Solo ===
- Curiosity (1986) – No. 102 Billboard 200

=== Charts ===
Chart performance for singles by Regina
Title	Year	Peak chart positions			
Title	Year	US	US Dance	US R&B	UK
"Baby Love"	1986	10	1	30	50
"Beat of Love (Remix)"	1986	—	40	—	—
"Head On"	1986	—	—	—	—
"Extraordinary Love"	1988	—	11	—	—

Note: Billboard incorrectly lists "Day by Day" as a 1997 hit for Regina. The song actually belongs to Regina "Queen" Saraiva.

== See also ==
- List of number-one dance hits (United States)
- List of artists who reached number one on the US Dance chart
