= Summer of Love (Dannii Minogue song) =

Single by Dannii Minogue
- Released: 7 March 2015
- Recorded: 2015
- Genre: House
- Length: 5:01
- Label: Shiny Disco Productions
- Songwriters: Tom Diesel; Ron E. Jones
- Producers: Tom Diesel; Ian Masterson for Thriller Jill

Dannii Minogue singles chronology
"Touch Me Like That" (2007)	"Summer of Love" (2015)	"100 Degrees" (2015)

Music video
- "Summer of Love" (Extended Mix) on YouTube

"Summer of Love" is a dance-pop song performed by Australian singer-songwriter Dannii Minogue. The Extended Mix of the song was released worldwide on 7 March 2015 and features a rap section by British rapper Reece.

== Background ==
In February 2015, Dannii Minogue announced that, after a long hiatus, she planned to make her musical comeback on Sydney Gay and Lesbian Mardi Gras. Minogue also revealed she had been working on new music.

Following the announcement, Minogue, Reece and the official Sydney Mardi Gras profiles launched a mysterious online campaign on social media featuring the #pressplay hashtag. Finally, at the end of February, Sydney Mardi Gras shared a YouTube link to a video called #pressplay, featuring the Extended Mix of "Summer of Love".

On 2 March, the Extended Mix of "Summer of Love" was made available as a pre-order single on iTunes.

== Formats and track listings ==
These are the formats and track listings of major single releases of "Summer of Love".

Single

1. "Summer of Love" (Extended Mix) – 5:01

Remixes – EP

1. "Summer of Love" (Extended Mix Without Rap) – 5:01
2. "Summer of Love" (Rich B & Phil Marriot Club Mix) – 6:26
3. "Summer of Love" (Seamus Haji Remix) – 6:27
4. "Summer of Love" (As I Am Remix) – 5:15

Official Remixes

1. "Summer of Love" (Rich B & Phil Marriott Radio Edit) – 3:28

== Personnel ==
The following people contributed to "Summer of Love":

- Dannii Minogue – lead vocals
- Reece Robertson – rap
- Tom Diesel – songwriter, production
- Ron E. Jones – songwriter, additional vocals
- Ian Masterson for Thriller Jill – mixing, remix and additional production
- Terry Ronald – additional vocals
- Mitch Stevens – additional vocals
- Jodie Ward – artwork
- Sue Alali – lyric video
- Wally Crayon – cover art
