= L.A. Mix =

British dance/house/R&B band

- Origin: England
- Genres: Dance, house, R&B
- Years active: 1987–1992
- Labels: Breakout, A&M
- Past members: Les Adams; Emma Freilich; Mike Stevens

L.A. Mix were a British group composed of DMC mixer and club DJ Les Adams (29 November 1955 – 2 September 2019), his production partner and wife Emma Freilich and multi-instrumentalist Mike Stevens. All of the group's seven singles charted on the UK Singles Chart.

== Biography ==
L.A. Mix consisted of then husband-and-wife team Les Adams and Emma Freilich, and Mike Stevens.

Their first hit was in 1987, "Don't Stop (Jammin')", which was based on a simple 8-track demo that Adams had formed in his home studio, and made No. 47 on the UK Singles Chart. That record got L.A. Mix in trouble, as the bassline had been taken from the song "Love Is the Message", resulting in Vincent Montana Jr. attempting to take an injunction out on the group.

The record deal was initially only for one single, but then Adams remixed Maurice Joshua's "This Is Acid" by taking the vocals, adding a synth lead from Black Riot's "A Day in the Life", using the rhythm synth from Inner City's "Big Fun", sirens from some of Todd Terry's records and some assorted sexual screams of unknown origin from his collection, and as a result the record went to No. 1 on the Billboard Hot Dance/Club Songs chart. Thus, the record label decided to release another single.

That single was "Check This Out", which reached No. 6 in the UK in 1988 and was their biggest hit. That also raised legal ire, this time of the then-owner of Easy Street Records as the song included a short sample of "You Don't Know" by Serious Intention, and the owner of that label was one of New York's top lawyers. The matter was settled out of court for $15,000. It is not to be confused by a Hardhouse song of the same name, also released in 1988.

Next, in 1989 they released "Get Loose", which featured rapping by Pauline Bennett (under her stage name Jazzi P) and charted at No. 25 after they had been diagnosed by the songwriting team of Stock, Aitken and Waterman as being "unlikely to have another hit". A fourth single, also released in 1989, "Love Together" featuring Kevin Henry, charted at No. 66. These four singles were aggregated on the album On the Side, which was released in 1989.

In 1990, the first of three singles from L.A. Mix's second album was released. "Coming Back for More", also the title track of the new album, was released as a single. The song featured vocals from Franseco (Leslie George), and charted at No. 50. In 1991, "Mysteries of Love", featuring Beverlei Brown on lead vocals, Marcus C on rap and co-production from Andy Whitmore, was released and made No. 46. Their final single, "We Shouldn't Hold Hands in the Dark", also featured vocals from Franseco but also from Juliet Roberts and charted at No. 69. L.A. Mix also produced two UK top 40 singles (one of which was a top ten hit) for Dannii Minogue's 1991 album, Love and Kisses; "I Don't Wanna Take This Pain" and "Jump to the Beat". They also produced work for Krush vocalist Ruth Joy, on her 1992 MCA album, Pride and Joy.

On 2 September 2019, it was announced that Les Adams had suffered a heart attack and died, after having suffered heart problems for some time.

== Discography ==
=== Albums ===
- On the Side (1989), A&M
- Coming Back for More (1990), A&M

=== Singles ===
Year	Song	Label	UK
1987	"Don't Stop (Jammin')"	Breakout	47
1988	"Check This Out"	Breakout	6
1989	"Get Loose" (featuring Jazzi P)	Breakout/A&M	25
1989	"Love Together" (featuring Kevin Henry)	Breakout	66
1990	"Coming Back for More"	A&M	50
1991	"Mysteries of Love"	A&M	46
1991	"We Shouldn't Hold Hands in the Dark"	A&M	69
