= Everlasting Night =

Single by Dannii Minogue
- Released: 18 January 1999
- Recorded: 1998
- Genre: Dance-pop; disco
- Length: 4:11 (radio edit)
- Label: Mardi Gras Music
- Songwriters: Dannii Minogue; Mark Percy; Tim Lever; Ian Masterson; Terry Ronald
- Producer: Ian Masterson

Dannii Minogue singles chronology
"Coconut" (1998)	"Everlasting Night" (1999)	"Who Do You Love Now?" (2001)

"Everlasting Night" is a song written by Australian singer Dannii Minogue, Mark Percy, Tim Lever, Ian Masterson and Terry Ronald for the compilation Gay & Lesbian Mardi Gras of 1999 (1999). The song was produced by Ian Masterson. It was released as a single in January 1999 in Australia and reached number 42 on the singles chart, largely helped by the fact that the song was the official theme of the 1999 Sydney Gay and Lesbian Mardi Gras.

Originally written in 1995 while Minogue was working on material for a new album, she re-arranged it with long-time collaborators Ian Masterson and Terry Ronald after she had been approached by friends who were launching a new record label called Mardi Gras Music, the first gay and lesbian music label. Since its release, the song has become a favourite of Minogue's gay and lesbian fans and had become a live staple at British and Australian gay pride events.

The 1995 version was released on the 2009 album The 1995 Sessions.

== Music video ==
Minogue and a party-goer in the music video for "Everlasting Night"

"Everlasting Night" features a music video directed by Simon Smith, Gary Leeson and Minogue and was filmed in Sydney, Australia in 1999. The video, a tribute to Australia's gay and lesbian community, featured Minogue and a group of dancers performing in a club. It was heavily inspired by her performance the previous year at the Sydney Gay and Lesbian Mardi Gras and Minogue wanted it to convey the fun, party-like atmosphere she had experienced during her performance. The video was filmed in a Sydney nightclub called Home and featured many of Minogue's friends as dancers and party-goers.

The video begins with a drag queen stepping out of an elevator lip synching the first line of the song and then fades into fast-paced footage of a disco ball, people dancing at a party and street festivities during the Sydney Gay and Lesbian Mardi Gras. Scenes of the festivities are intercut with scenes of drag queens lip synching the song and Minogue dancing in a crowd of people.

== Track listing ==
CD single

1. "Everlasting Night" (Radio edit) – 4:11
2. "Everlasting Night" (Extended mix) – 9:04
3. "Everlasting Night" (Trouser Enthusiasts Burnt Angel mix) – 9:58

== Charts ==
Chart performance for "Everlasting Night"
Chart (1999)	Peak position
Australia (ARIA)	42
