= All I Wanna Do (Dannii Minogue song) =

1997 single by Dannii Minogue

Single by Dannii Minogue

from the album Girl
- Released: 11 August 1997
- Genre: Hi-NRG
- Length: 4:29
- Label: Eternal; WEA
- Songwriters: Brian Higgins; Stuart McLennan; Tim Powe; Matt Gray
- Producers: Brian Higgins; Matt Gray

Dannii Minogue singles chronology
"Boogie Woogie" (1995)	"All I Wanna Do" (1997)	"Everything I Wanted" (1997)

Music video
- "All I Wanna Do" on YouTube

"All I Wanna Do" is a song written by Brian Higgins, Stuart McLennan, Tim Powell, and Matt Gray for Australian singer Dannii Minogue's third studio album, Girl (1997). The song was produced by Higgins and Gray. "All I Wanna Do" marked a significant change in Minogue's career and image, as did her album Girl from which it was taken. Her image had become highly sexualised, culminating in her nude calendar photo shoot and the suggestive videos and album artwork which accompanied her new releases. This was also the first release on Minogue's new record deal with Warner Bros. Records.

"All I Wanna Do" was released as the first single from Girl on 11 August 1997 and peaked at number four in the United Kingdom, becoming Minogue's first top-five hit. In Australia, the song peaked at number 11, spent 22 weeks in the top 100, and was certified gold, becoming the 78th-highest-selling single of 1997 there. The accompanying music video was directed by Paul Morgans. In 2017, the Official Charts Company revealed that "All I Wanna Do" is Minogue's best-selling UK single.

== Critical reception ==
Scottish Aberdeen Evening Express stated that "All I Wanna Do" has got "the catchiest chorus around". Quentin Harrison from Albumism described it as a "shimmering, 90s Hi-NRG rocker". British magazine Music Week gave it a score of four out of five, concluding that "three years on from her last single, Dannii sticks to what she does best with this delightfully catchy pop gem which is given an extra lift by powerfully energetic production." Also Chris Finan from the RM Dance Update gave it four out of five, adding that "this is the most credible that Dannii's ever sounded." Sunday Mirror called it "supremely camp", noting it as a "bass-bumping, shuddering return for the more rounded Minogue girl." They added, "Dreamy chorus and banging remixes should see Dannii well out in front." A reviewer from The Sydney Morning Herald wrote that "All I Wanna Do", "with its souped-up production and insanely catchy refrain, is one of the finest pieces of fluff this year. There's nothing else on Girl that touches it for instant satisfaction."

== Music video ==
"All I Wanna Do" features a music video directed by Paul Morgans and was filmed in a studio using green screen technology in 1997. The video marked a significant change in style for Minogue, cultivating a more sexual image of the artist. The video references webcam voyeurism and features Minogue against a Barbie-esque backdrop sensually dancing and engaging with the camera and stroking a white cat. In other scenes, Minogue is riding a Ducati motorcycle and playing a guitar. The video can be seen as a turning point for Minogue, after which she adopted a more sexual and confident persona in her music videos.

The video for "All I Wanna Do" was included on the Australian video collection The Videos in 1998 and the special edition of her greatest hits CD/DVD release The Hits & Beyond in 2006, as well as featuring on her more recent videography retrospective DVD, Dannii Minogue: The Video Collection.

== Live performances ==
Minogue has performed "All I Wanna Do" on numerous occasions, on shows such as BBC's Top of the Pops, as well as live performances at the legendary G.A.Y nightclub in London (both at the Astoria and its now venue Heaven) as well as performing the track during the Sydney Mardi Gras of 1998 and Mushroom Records 25 Year Anniversary Festival in Australia. Minogue also performed "All I Wanna Do" in an a cappella style during her 1998 appearance on the UK show TFI Friday with Chris Evans. In more recent years, Minogue has performed the song at numerous club appearances and most recently in 2015 at the Australian Sydney Gay Lesbian and Transgender Mardi Gras party where she performed the song in a mashup style with "Summer of Love" and as part of her headlining set. The song is considered one of her signature tracks.

== Track listings ==
- Australian and UK cassette single
1. "All I Wanna Do" (radio version) – 4:30
2. "All I Wanna Do" (Tiny Tim & The Mekon Dream dub) – 7:43
- Australian and UK CD1, Japanese CD single
1. "All I Wanna Do" (radio version) – 4:30
2. "All I Wanna Do" (12-inch extended mix) – 6:51
3. "All I Wanna Do" (Trouser Enthusiasts' Toys of Desperation mix) – 11:04
4. "All I Wanna Do" (Xenomania Dream House mix) – 5:53
5. "All I Wanna Do" (D-Bop's Innocent Girl mix) – 7:28
6. "All I Wanna Do" (video)
- Australian and UK CD2
1. "All I Wanna Do" (radio version) – 4:30
2. "All I Wanna Do" (Qattara's mix) – 10:06
3. "All I Wanna Do" (Trouser Enthusiasts' Ultra Sensitive dub) – 10:16
4. "All I Wanna Do" (Dizzy's mix) – 7:38
5. "All I Wanna Do" (Sharp "System" dub) – 7:26
- European CD single
1. "All I Wanna Do" (radio version) – 4:30
2. "All I Wanna Do" (Xenomania Dream House mix) – 5:53

== Charts ==
=== Weekly charts ===
Chart (1997)	Peak position
Australia (ARIA)	11
Belgium (Ultratop 50 Flanders)	20
Europe (Eurochart Hot 100)	19
Iceland (Íslenski Listinn Topp 40)	14
Israel (Israeli Singles Chart)	7
Scottish Singles Sales (Official Charts)	5
Sweden (Sverigetopplistan)	48
UK Singles (Official Charts)	4
UK Dance (Official Charts)	1

=== Year-end charts ===
Chart (1997)	Position
Australia (ARIA)	78
UK Singles (OCC)	68

== Certifications ==
Region	Certification	Certified units/sales
Australia (ARIA)	Gold	35,000^{^}
^{^} Shipments figures based on certification alone.

== "All I Wanna Do 2020" ==
"All I Wanna Do 2020"

Single by Dannii Minogue
- Released: 24 June 2020
- Recorded: 2020
- Genre: Dance-pop; trance; ambient
- Length: 3:07
- Label: Shiny Disco Productions
- Songwriters: Brian Higgins; Stuart McLennan; Tim Powell; Matt Gray
- Producers: Ian Masterson; Dorian West

Dannii Minogue singles chronology
"Galaxy" (2017)	"All I Wanna Do 2020" (2020)	"We Could Be the One" (2023)

Music video
- "All I Wanna Do 2020" on YouTube

Reworked especially for Pride Month 2020, "All I Wanna Do 2020" features brand new vocals from Dannii, alongside a stirring and dramatic production from Ian Masterson.

Dannii says: "This is a completely new take on All I Wanna Do for 2020 - a year when, globally, we've not been able to hold and touch the ones we love. All I want to do with this track is spread some sparkly cheer for Global Pride 2020. Wherever you are in the world, Pride celebrations this year will be vastly different to what we would have anticipated even six months ago. My hope is we can still connect with one another and create some memories that comfort us and bring smiles".

Producer Ian Masterson says: "I can’t quite believe it’s been 23 years since I did the Trouser Enthusiasts mixes on the original release of "All I Wanna Do". It seems our sound has come full circle again and now a new generation of clubbers are discovering pop trance. It was exciting to brush off the cobwebs and get back on the dance floor. Dannii and I have made a lot of music in the intervening years so it’s a joy to return to where we first started out and update this track for 2020".

Dannii will also be releasing a brand new EP of All I Wanna Do 2020 – The Remixes, featuring fresh mixes from Trouser Enthusiasts and celebrated singer/songwriter and producer Bright Light, Bright Light. The remix EP will be released on Global Pride day, Saturday 27 June. Bright Light Bright Light says: "Getting to remix one of my favourite songs, by one of my favourite artists, during Pride Month, is absolutely one of the most fun things that's happened to me! I imagined myself on Fire Island drinking cocktails in the sun, and the remix kind of made itself, Dannii's voice is so perfect draped in disco sounds." On 6 August, an additional remix set by Until Dawn was made available.

=== Formats ===
- All I Wanna Do 2020
1. "All I Wanna Do 2020" – 3:07
- All I Wanna Do 2020 – The Remixes
1. "All I Wanna Do 2020" (Trousers Enthusiasts Club Mix) – 9:05
2. "All I Wanna Do 2020" (Bright Light Bright Light Poolside Disco Mix) – 5:32
3. "All I Wanna Do 2020" (Bright Light Bright Light Poolside Edit) – 3:24
4. "All I Wanna Do 2020" (Trousers Enthusiasts Radio Edit) – 3:31
5. "All I Wanna Do 2020" (Trousers Enthusiasts Dub) – 7:14
- All I Wanna Do 2020 – Until Dawn Remix
1. "All I Wanna Do 2020" (Until Dawn Remix) – 2:40
2. "All I Wanna Do 2020" (Until Dawn Extended Remix) – 4:25

=== Personnel ===
Credits adapted from YouTube.

- Dannii Minogue – lead vocals
- Dorian West – engineer, producer, guitar, keyboards and backing vocals
- Ian Masterson (for Thriller Jill) – producer, programming, additional keyboards and mixing
- Kaylah Attard – backing vocals
- Pizzazzart – single and video artwork
