= Dannii Minogue =

Australian singer and actress (born 1971)

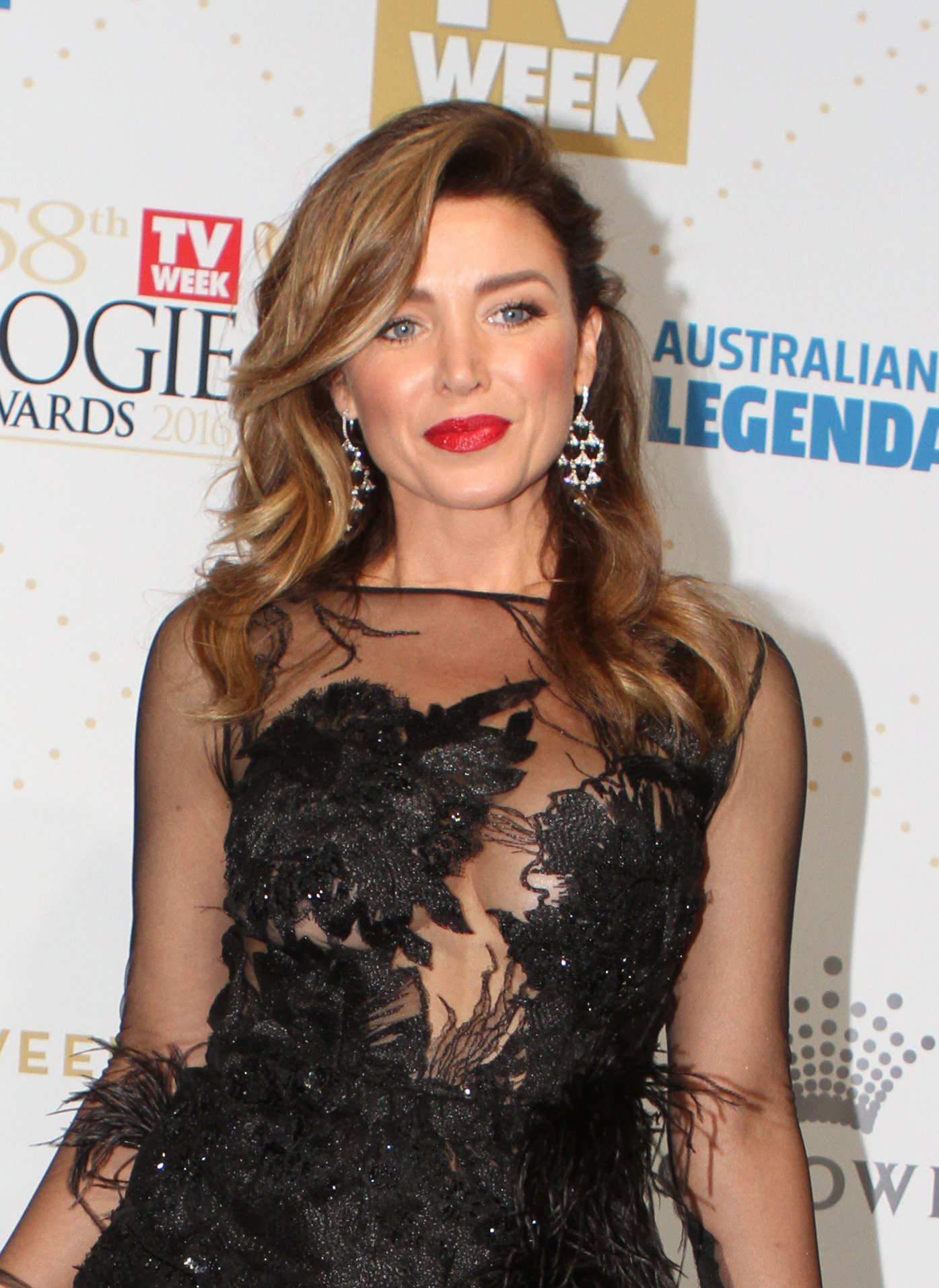
- Minogue at the 58th Annual Logie Awards in 2016
- Born: Danielle Jane Minogue; 20 October 1971 (age 55); Melbourne, Victoria, Australia
- Occupations: Singer; television personality; actress
- Years active: 1984–present
- Spouse: Julian McMahon (m. 1994; div. 1995)
- Partner: Kris Smith (2008–2012)
- Children: 1
- Relatives: Kylie Minogue (sister)
- Musical career
- Genres: Pop; dance
- Instrument: Vocals
- Labels: Mushroom; MCA; Warner; London; Ultra; All Around the World
- Website: danniiminogue.com

Danielle Jane "Dannii" Minogue (/mɪˈnoʊɡ/; born 20 October 1971) is an Australian singer, television personality, and actress. She rose to prominence as a child appearing on the television talent show Young Talent Time (1982–1988), before gaining further recognition for her portrayal of Emma Jackson on the soap opera Home and Away (1988–1990). Minogue began her music career in the 1990s, achieving early success with her debut album, Love and Kisses (1991), and the singles "Love and Kisses", "Jump to the Beat" and "Success". Following the release of her second album, Get into You (1993), her popularity as a singer declined, leading her to make a name for herself with award-winning performances in theatre productions.

The late 1990s saw a brief return to music for Minogue, after the singer reinvented herself as a dance artist with her third album, Girl (1997). Her fourth album, Neon Nights (2003), became the most successful of her career and spawned the hit singles "Who Do You Love Now?", "Put the Needle on It" and "I Begin to Wonder". In 2007, she released her fifth album, Club Disco. In the UK, Minogue has achieved nine Top 10 singles and 13 consecutive number-one dance singles. In her home country of Australia, she has achieved 12 Top 30 singles and 6 gold-certified singles. She is also recognised as the younger sister of fellow singer Kylie Minogue, with whom she has occasionally collaborated throughout her career.

Minogue has served as a judge on television talent shows, including The X Factor UK (2007–2010), Australia's Got Talent (2007–2012), Britain & Ireland's Next Top Model (2013), The X Factor Australia (2013–2015), Let It Shine (2017), and The Masked Singer Australia (2019–2021). As a television presenter, she has hosted It's Not Just Saturday (1996), Dance Boss (2018), Ultimate Beastmaster (2018), I Kissed a Boy (2023–2025), and I Kissed a Girl (2024, 2026).

== Early life and career beginnings ==
Danielle Jane Minogue was born on 20 October 1971 and brought up in Surrey Hills, Melbourne. She attended Camberwell Primary School and later Camberwell High School. She is the younger daughter of Carol Ann Jones, a dancer from Maesteg, Wales, and accountant Ronald Charles Minogue. She is the youngest of three children; her older sister is singer Kylie Minogue, while her brother Brendan is a news cameraman in Australia.

Minogue began her career as a child on Australian television. From the age of 7, she appeared in several soap operas, including Skyways and The Sullivans. In 1982, she joined the weekly music programme Young Talent Time. Minogue recorded her first solo recordings for the programme, including a cover version of Madonna's hit single "Material Girl"; during this time, she also performed live at several sold-out nationwide concert tours. In 1988, Minogue departed from Young Talent Time to continue her acting career, appearing as the rebellious tomboyish teenager Emma Jackson on the soap opera Home and Away in 1989. Minogue remained on the programme for only a year. She proved to be popular among Australian audiences when she was nominated for a Silver Logie as the Most Popular Actress on Australian television.

In September 1988, Minogue released her own fashion range, Dannii. She became interested in fashion design while appearing on Young Talent Time. Minogue had designed the clothing she had worn on the show, and the positive response from the audience resulted in her releasing her own line. Minogue's debut line Dannii sold out across Australia in ten days and was followed by three additional summer lines in 1989.

== Music career ==
=== 1990–1995: Dannii and Get into You ===
Minogue signed a recording contract with Australian-based Mushroom Records in January 1989. Her first album, Dannii, was released the following year and reached number twenty-four on the Australian albums chart. Outside Australia, the album was released in 1991 under the title Love and Kisses and peaked at number eight in the United Kingdom and was certified gold. Minogue's debut single "Love and Kisses" peaked at number four on the Australian singles chart and was certified gold. In the UK, the song peaked at number eight on the singles chart. Subsequent singles "Success", "Jump to the Beat", "Baby Love" and "I Don't Wanna Take This Pain" all reached the UK top 40.

Minogue released Love and Kisses and..., a re-issue of her debut album, in November 1991. The album, a collection of dance songs, comprised tracks and remixes from Love and Kisses. It peaked at number 42 on the UK albums chart and sold nearly 60,000 copies in its own right. Several remixes by producer and DJ Steve "Silk" Hurley were successful in European dance clubs. She credits these remixes for providing her with a "new image and sound to work with" on future releases. Also that year, Minogue made her feature film debut in Secrets, which co-starred Noah Taylor. The film revolved around five Australian teenagers who become stuck in the basement of a hotel in an attempt to see The Beatles. The film was not well received by audiences or critics, with Minogue's performance being described as "not all that convincing".

Minogue released her second album Get into You, which included the songs "Show You the Way to Go", "This Is It" and "This Is the Way", in October 1993. The album contained uptempo dance tracks, but despite her past chart success, failed to make the British top fifty. In mid-1994, Minogue returned to television as a presenter, co-hosting Channel 4's morning show The Big Breakfast in the UK. In 1995, Minogue released the singles "Rescue Me" and "Boogie Woogie", a collaboration with dance act Eurogroove. Released only in Japan, both songs reached number one on the Japanese singles chart. She began recording her third album in 1995; however, Minogue and her record label, Mushroom Records, parted ways in late 1995 following a contract disagreement. The tracks recorded in 1994/1995 for Minogue's planned third album were unheard for many years, they were finally released in 2009 via Cargo Records on the compilation album The 1995 Sessions. In 1991, Minogue appeared before the Queen at the Royal Variety Show where she sang "Success".

=== 1996–2004: Girl and Neon Nights ===
In 1996, Minogue resumed her co-hosting duties, presenting the Eggs on Legs road show segment. That same year, Minogue briefly hosted the children's show Disney Time and co-hosted, with Gareth Jones, the teenage Saturday morning entertainment show It's Not Just Saturday for 16. In 1997, Minogue hosted Top of the Pops, a British music chart television programme, before returning to her recording career later that year. In April 1997, Minogue made her stage debut as Rizzo in the musical Grease: The Arena Spectacular. In Australia, the show sold over 450,000 tickets during its first season. The following year, Minogue resumed her role as Rizzo, performing in New Zealand. At the 1998 Mo Awards, Minogue was nominated for "Best Female Musical Theatre Performer" for her role.

Following the release of several remixes of her songs by Steve "Silk" Hurley, Minogue became interested in dance music. She commented that the remixes were "the first thing I did that was really cool and my love of dance music and clubbing started from there." Minogue's interest in dance music and clubbing influenced her third album, Girl, released in September 1997, which featured collaborations with musicians such as Brian Higgins of Xenomania. The album presented a more sophisticated and adult style of dance music, but despite generally positive reviews, failed to make the British top 50. The lead single "All I Wanna Do", which the Daily Mirror described as a "bass-bumping, shuddering return", peaked at number four on the UK singles chart. In her native Australia, the single peaked at number eleven and was certified gold. The album's second single "Everything I Wanted" made the top 20 in the UK and the top 50 in Australia, while the third single "Disremembrance" narrowly missed the top 20 in the UK, peaking at number 21. All three singles released from Girl reached number one on the UK dance chart.

In June 1998, Minogue began The Unleashed Tour, a 22-date UK tour. Mushroom Records released two budget compilation albums in December 1998, as part of the label's 25th anniversary. Released only in Australia, The Singles comprised all Minogue's single releases, while The Remixes contained popular remixes. These releases were promoted with the song "Coconut", which was previously only available as a hidden track on CD versions of the Girl album. In January 1999, following her performance at the 1998 Sydney Gay and Lesbian Mardi Gras, Minogue released the festival's first official theme song, "Everlasting Night". It appeared on the compilation CD Gay & Lesbian Mardi Gras of 1999 and its music video, co-directed by Minogue, was a tribute to Australia's gay and lesbian community.

In November 2001, Minogue released the single, "Who Do You Love Now?", a collaboration with Riva. Described by Sound Generator as a "nice serene and dreamy vocal on the dance floor anthem", the song peaked at number three on the UK singles chart and reached number one on the dance charts. In Australia, the song peaked at number 15, while in the United States the song was released to dance clubs and reached number 12 on the US Billboard Dance Club chart. In 2001, Minogue signed a six-album deal with London Records, a subsidiary of Warner Music International.

"I Begin to Wonder" (2003)
A dance track that features Minogue's vocals over a heavy bass line.

In March 2003, Minogue released her fourth album, Neon Nights, which the BBC called "a pleasant cocktail of pop sophistication, club culture and accessibility". It consisted of 1980s inspired dance-pop songs and provided Minogue with some of the strongest reviews of her career. Neon Nights peaked at number eight on the UK albums chart (her highest ranking since her debut) and produced four top 10 singles. "Who Do You Love Now?" was not officially released as the first single; however, it was included on the album. The official lead single was "Put the Needle on It", a 1980s inspired dance-pop song which became a top 10 hit in the UK, peaking at number seven. It enjoyed top 20 success in several countries including Australia, where it peaked at number 11 and was certified gold. The second single, "I Begin to Wonder", was declared one of the "best things" on the album by Ireland's Radio Telefís Éireann and became her highest-charting single in the UK, peaking at number two. In Australia, the single garnered Minogue another top 20 hit, peaking at number 14 and was also certified gold. Third single "Don't Wanna Lose This Feeling" reached number five in the UK, while in Australia the single just missed the top 20, charting at number 22. Following extensive airplay by North American dance radio, Warner Music Group released the album in the United States in late 2003. Singles "I Begin to Wonder" and "Don't Wanna Lose This Feeling" were also substantial successes on the US dance charts.

=== 2004–2006: The Hits & Beyond ===
In June 2004, Afterlife released the album Speck of Gold, which featured Minogue on the single "Take Me Inside". The album was released in Australia in 2008, featuring two different versions of the song. In October 2004, Minogue released the single "You Won't Forget About Me", a collaboration with the dance act Flower Power. Described by MSN Entertainment as a "real grower" and noted for its "snip snapping house beats and '80s flecked synths", the song peaked at number seven on the UK singles chart and also made the top 20 in Australia. "Perfection", a collaboration with the Soul Seekerz, followed in October 2005 where it reached the top twenty in both the UK and Australia.

"So Under Pressure" (2006)
A song inspired by the cancer diagnosis of her sister Kylie Minogue.

Minogue released The Hits & Beyond, a greatest hits album, in June 2006. The album consisted of new songs alongside singles from her four studio albums. It debuted at number 17 on the UK Albums Chart. The album introduced a new single, "So Under Pressure", inspired by the cancer diagnoses of her sister Kylie as well as that of an unnamed friend. On 11 December Minogue performed "Kids" with her sister Kylie during Showgirl: The Homecoming Tour in Melbourne and "Celebration" on 31 December in London at Wembley Arena. The single made the top 20 in Australia and the UK and also became her 10th consecutive song to reach the number one spot on the UK Upfront Club chart. Minogue has described the recording of "So Under Pressure" as a "real achievement" as she was "brave enough to put all [her feelings] into words". In September 2006, Minogue's cover of "I'll Be Home for Christmas" appeared on Spirit of Christmas, a compilation album of holiday songs available through the Myer department store chain across Australia.

In November 2006, Minogue performed Sister Sledge's 1979 song "He's the Greatest Dancer" on BBC One's Children in Need telethon. A studio version of the song, remixed by Fugitive, appeared on the dance compilation Clubland 10, which was released in November 2006. The following month, "He's the Greatest Dancer" was released to UK dance clubs and reached number one on the Upfront Club chart. It also charted in the top 40 on the Australian singles chart.

=== 2007–2010: Unleashed and Club Disco ===
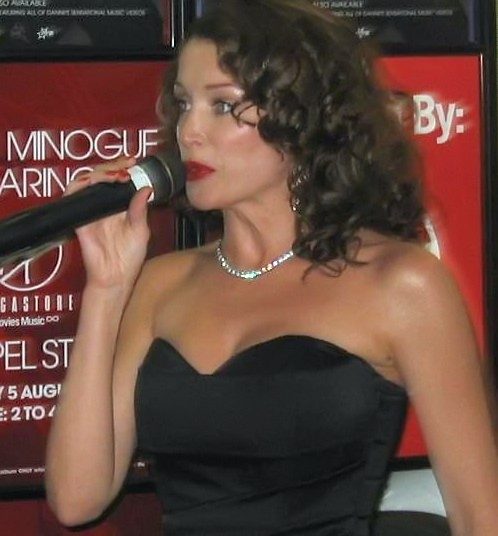
Minogue performing in 2008

October onwards saw a total of five releases from Minogue; first, on 29 October, reissues of her 1997 and 2003 albums Girl and Neon Nights, each containing two discs, the second disc of which includes remixes. On 5 November, she released Unleashed, a collection of previously unheard material from her time with London Records, and The Video Collection, which includes every one of her music videos as well as bonus features. Minogue's fifth studio album Club Disco was released on the same date and in May 2008 in Australia, featuring several previously released singles, such as "You Won't Forget About Me", "Perfection", and "So Under Pressure", cancelled single "I Can't Sleep at Night" and covers of "Xanadu" and the disco classic "He's the Greatest Dancer". Finally, on 3 December, a single was released, titled "Touch Me Like That", which peaked at number one on the UK Dance Chart.

In early 2008, Minogue was hired as the headline performer at Australian Fashion Week. In particular, she was booked to make an appearance at the opening party hosted by MAC Cosmetics. She also released Club Disco as a double album in Australia with some changes to the track listing. At the start of 2009, a digital compilation album, The Early Years, was released online that featured songs from Minogue's first two studio albums.

On 7 December 2009, Minogue released The 1995 Sessions, an album full of previously unreleased recordings made for what would have been her then third studio album, which never materialised due to differences with her then label. On the same date, Minogue re-released remastered editions of her first two albums with MCA Records, her debut Love & Kisses and the follow-up Get into You. In total Minogue's music has achieved more than 200 weeks on the UK Sales Chart and she has sold more than seven-million records worldwide. On 23 June 2010, ITV2 announced Dannii Minogue: Style Queen, a three-part documentary about Minogue's fashion line "Project D", The X Factor, motherhood, her partner Kris Smith and her return to music as well as writing her autobiography My Story, which was produced by Steve Vizard and broadcast in Australia on Foxtel.

=== 2011–2014: This Is It: The Very Best Of ===
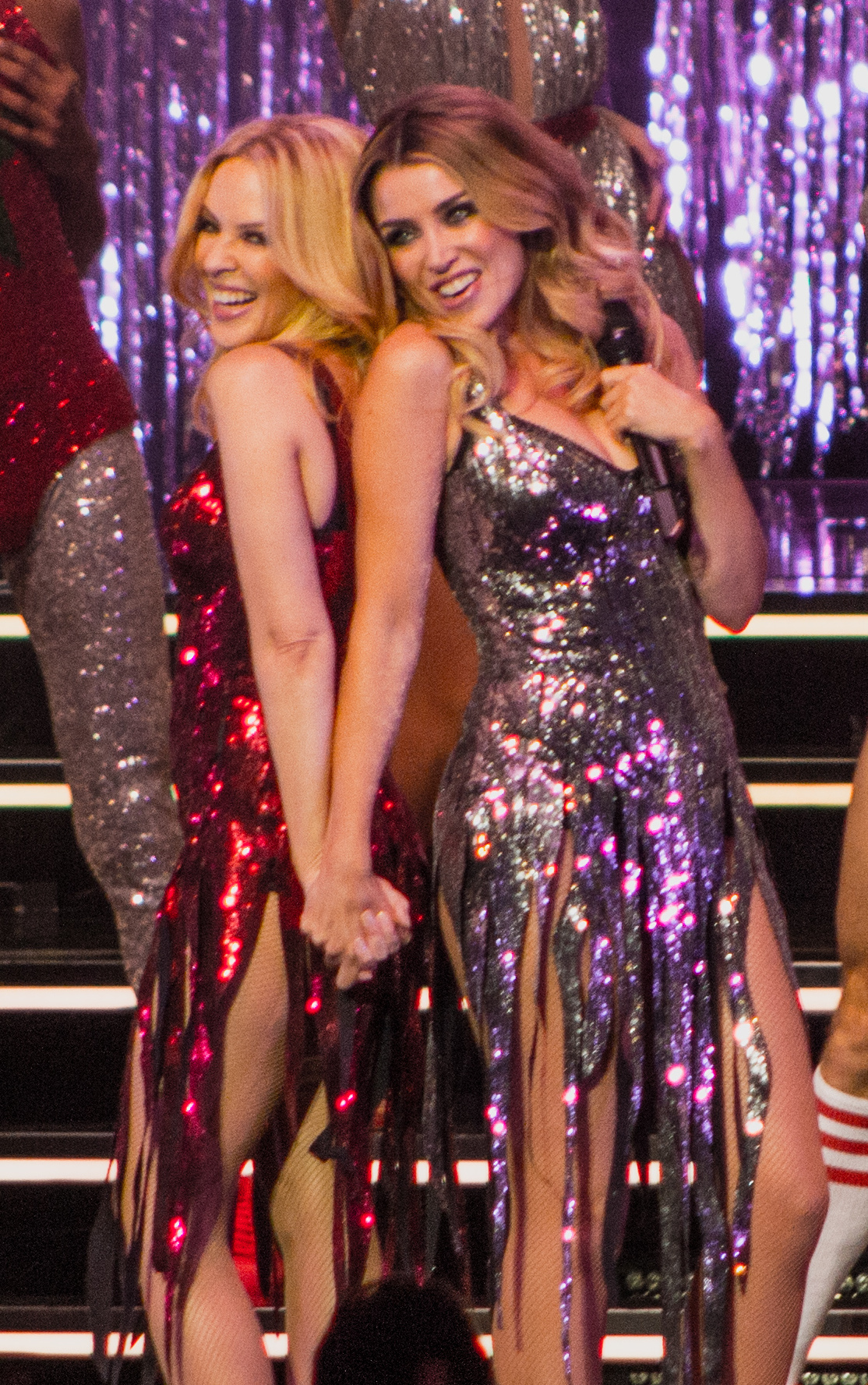
Minogue performing at Royal Albert Hall with her sister Kylie during A Kylie Christmas Show in 2015

In January 2012, Minogue appeared in the ITV documentary The Talent Show Story where she talked about her time on The X Factor UK and working on talent shows. Other talent show judges interviewed included Gary Barlow, Louis Walsh, Kelly Rowland, Tulisa, Amanda Holden, Piers Morgan, Carrie Grant and Simon Cowell, as well as The X Factor host Dermot O'Leary and Britain's Got Talent hosts Ant & Dec. In February 2012, Minogue officially opened Madame Tussauds Sydney, unveiling a waxwork of herself at the launch.

In September 2013, Minogue teamed up with Ronan Keating to record a duet of the Christmas classic "Santa Claus Is Coming to Town" for department store chain Myer's The Spirit of Christmas 2013 compilation. In late 2014, Minogue recorded a cover version of "That's How You Know" for the Australian We Love Disney album.

=== 2015–present: Musical comeback ===
In February 2015, Minogue announced that, after a long hiatus, she planned to make her musical comeback at the Sydney Gay and Lesbian Mardi Gras. Minogue also revealed she had been working on new music. Following the announcement, Minogue, British rapper Reece Robertson and the official Sydney Mardi Gras profiles launched a mysterious online campaign on social media featuring the #pressplay hashtag. At the end of February, Sydney Mardi Gras shared a YouTube link to a video called #pressplay featuring the extended mix of "Summer of Love". On 2 March, the extended mix of "Summer of Love" was made available to pre-order on iTunes.

In December 2015, she and her sister Kylie released their duet 100 Degrees for the latter's Christmas album Kylie Christmas. They performed the song on The X Factor Australia and on Kylie's Christmas Show at the Royal Albert Hall.

In August 2017, Minogue confirmed that she would be a support act for Take That on their first Australian tour in over twenty years, which would take place that November. She also announced a single titled "Holding On" would be released on 11 August and that more new music would be released around the time of the tour. On 2 November 2017, Minogue confirmed she would release a song titled "Galaxy" on 10 November, a day before the tour was due to start.

In February 2023, Dannii Minogue appeared on‑stage alongside her sister Kylie Minogue at the opening concert of Sydney WorldPride 2023 in The Domain, Sydney — the first time the festival has been held in the Southern Hemisphere. Later in 2023, it was announced that Minogue would be releasing a new song just weeks after her sister, Kylie Minogue, would be releasing the lead single for her upcoming album Tension, "Padam Padam". Minogue's song "We Could Be the One" was released on 2 June 2023, and also features as the opening song for the British gay dating show that she hosts, I Kissed a Boy. It charted at number 5 on the UK Singles Downloads Chart on 9 June 2023. On 16 June 2023, Minogue released an anniversary edition of her Neon Nights album. Titled Neon Nights 20, the album was made available on all digital outlets and CD and vinyl. Minogue had confirmed the deluxe, expanded anniversary issue in April 2023. On 2 February 2024, she released a new single, "Thinking ‘Bout Us".

On 9 September 2026, Minogue released the single "Dirty Dirty Disco", a collaboration with Rogue Traders.

== Television career ==
=== UK television ===
In 2007, Minogue became a judge on the fourth series of The X Factor UK, alongside Simon Cowell, Louis Walsh and Sharon Osbourne. She mentored the Boys category and selected Leon Jackson, Rhydian Roberts and Andy Williams to represent her in the live shows of the competition. Ultimately, two of her chosen acts, Roberts and Jackson, became the final two, with Jackson eventually becoming the winner after topping the public vote. Minogue was the first female judge to win The X Factor UK. On 20 September 2008, Minogue presented the Nickelodeon UK Kids' Choice Awards ceremony. That same year, Minogue returned to the show's fifth series alongside Cowell, Walsh and Cheryl Cole, who replaced Osbourne. Following the initial auditions and boot camp stages of the competition, Minogue was assigned the Over 25s category to mentor. She chose Daniel Evans, Rachel Hylton and Ruth Lorenzo as her top three contestants for the live shows and was assisted by Spice Girls member Emma Bunton. In the quarter-final, Minogue lost her final act as Lorenzo was the eighth act eliminated from the competition, leaving her without a act in the semi-final.

Throughout the fifth series, several people in the entertainment industry, including Ronan Keating, Noel Gallagher and Graham Norton questioned Minogue's judging credentials and mentoring ability. On 22 November 2008, during a live broadcast of the programme, Minogue broke down in tears and was unable to introduce one of her acts, Rachel Hylton, following an on-air row with Louis Walsh over a choice of song. Despite the controversies, she proved popular in public votes and polls. Minogue later stated that she did not enjoy her experience on the fifth series and "would never want to go through that again". Minogue returned for the sixth series in 2009 and mentored the Girls category. She chose Rachel Adedeji, Lucie Jones and Stacey Solomon as her top three contestants to compete in the live shows and was assisted at the judges' houses stage by her older sister, Kylie Minogue. Despite losing Adedeji in week 4 and Jones the following week, Solomon went on to advance into the final and ultimately becoming the last act eliminated. In 2010, Minogue was pregnant. She later stated that, as her baby's expected arrival in July would clash with filming for The X Factor audition dates, she would be unable to judge in the audition and boot camp episodes for the seventh series. Minogue returned during the judges' houses stage. She mentored the Boys category selecting Nicolo Festa, Matt Cardle and Aiden Grimshaw as her top three acts, with Paije Richardson as her wildcard. Minogue was assisted by fellow Australian and friend Natalie Imbruglia who was a guest judge in the Birmingham auditions that year filling in for Minogue. Cardle was her only contestant to advance to the final and eventually won, with Minogue becoming the winning mentor for the second time.

On 14 May 2011, it was announced that Minogue would not be returning for the eighth series of The X Factor UK. Of her decision, Minogue said "During discussions for me to return (to The X Factor) it became clear that unfortunately, this year, the X Factor audition dates in the UK clash with the live shows of Australia's Got Talent during June and July. For this reason I am unable to return." She was replaced by Kelly Rowland. In January 2012, Minogue appeared on the ITV documentary The Talent Show Story where she talked about her time on The X Factor and working on talent shows. Other The X Factor judges who were interviewed included Gary Barlow, Walsh, Tulisa, Rowland and Simon Cowell as well as the host Dermot O'Leary. In June 2013, Minogue joined Elle Macpherson and Tyson Beckford on the judging panel for the ninth series of Sky Living's Britain & Ireland's Next Top Model. She replaced Whitney Port and Julien McDonald.

In September 2016, it was revealed Minogue was returning to British television, as a judge on the judging panel of Gary Barlow talent show Let It Shine alongside fellow judges Martin Kemp and Barlow. In May 2022, it was announced that Minogue would host a brand new gay dating show in the UK on BBC Three called I Kissed a Boy. The list of contestants and a preview for the show were released in April 2023. The show officially aired on Saturday 13 May 2023 on BBC Three. In 2024, Minogue began hosting a spinoff of the show, for lesbians, with I Kissed a Girl also airing on BBC Three. In May 2024, it was announced that I Kissed a Boy would be returning for a second season, with Minogue returning as host.

=== Australian television ===
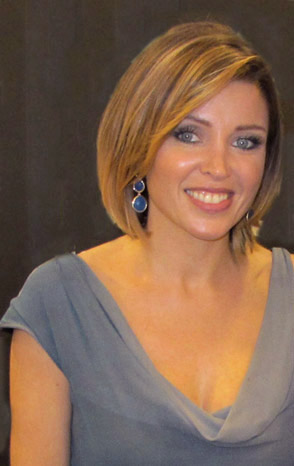
Minogue in 2010

In 2007, Minogue was hired by Simon Cowell to become a judge on the Seven Network talent show Australia's Got Talent along with Red Symons and Tom Burlinson. It was after this series that Minogue was offered the role on The X Factor UK after Cowell thought she proved good as a judge on Australia's Got Talent. She returned to the panel for seasons two and three in 2008 and 2009. Australia's Got Talent returned for a fourth season in 2010, and Minogue was the only original judge to remain on the panel as producers revamped the series. Brian McFadden and Kyle Sandilands took the places of Red Symons and Tom Burlinson. Minogue also returned for the fifth season in 2011 and the sixth season in 2012. In November 2012, it was announced that Minogue would not be returning for the seventh season in an attempt to reboot the show. She was replaced by Geri Halliwell in the Nine Network's version of the show.

In 2013, Minogue joined the judging panel of the fifth season of The X Factor Australia as Mel B's replacement. She joined returning judges Ronan Keating and Natalie Bassingthwaighte and fellow new judge Redfoo, who replaced Guy Sebastian. Minogue mentored the Over 24s category and one of her contestants Dami Im came first place. Minogue reprised her judging role for the sixth season in 2014. She mentored the Groups category and one of her contestants Brothers3 were the last contestant to be eliminated in the competition. Minogue returned for the seventh season in 2015 as a judge where she mentored the Girls Category and ended up losing all of her contestants by the 7th week of the show. She departed the show prior to the eighth season and was replaced by Mel B.

In 2019, she was announced as one of the panellists on the Australian version of The Masked Singer alongside Jackie O, Dave Hughes and Lindsay Lohan. Minogue returned for the second season alongside Jackie O and Hughes, and new judge Urzila Carlson who replaced Lohan. All judges returned for the third season in 2021. However, in June 2022, it was announced that Minogue, Jackie O and Carlson would not be returning to the judging panel for the fourth season. It was later announced that Minogue departed the show because she was busy filming a new show in the UK. She was replaced by international pop singer Mel B.

On 30 July 2025, production for Australian / UK co-commissioned series Imposter announced that Minogue had been cast to the series in her first major television role since Home and Away.

== Other ventures ==
=== Theatre productions ===
In 1999, Minogue returned to theatre, starring in the production of Shakespeare's Macbeth at the Edinburgh Fringe Festival. The play received mixed reviews; critic Matt Grant wrote that Minogue "lacks true conviction as she ploughs through the lines without capturing their full force", while Fiachra Gibbons singled Minogue's performance out, noting in her review that Minogue's "disco-queen-from-hell delivery works well" for her character, Lady Macbeth. Two years later, Minogue appeared as Esmeralda in the musical production of Notre-Dame de Paris in London's West End. The musical received poor reviews from British critics who called it "lame" and its songs "reminiscent of [the] Eurovision song contest". At the 2002 Maxim Awards, she won "Best Stage Performance" for her role. In 2001, Minogue also appeared in the stage play The Vagina Monologues, which co-starred Kika Markham and Meera Syal.

=== Radio ===
In June 2003, Minogue hosted her own radio programme, Dannii Minogue's Neon Nights. Broadcast in Australia and the UK, Minogue played songs by up-and-coming DJs, as well as her own music. Minogue departed London Records when Warner (its parent owner) dismissed its staff and offered Minogue a deal to depart the label or stay and wait a year to release her next album which had been partially recorded. Minogue collaborated with producers Hugo Lira, Gareth Young, Ian Masterson, Ross Callum and Pascal Gabriel. Many of these tracks were later released on the album "Unleashed". Later that year she signed a new contract with independent dance label All Around the World Records.

=== Fashion ===
In the late 1980s, Minogue had a fashion range that she designed which was sold in Target Australia. Since joining The X Factor and Australia's Got Talent in 2007, Minogue has become a Style Icon in Australia, Ireland and the United Kingdom, receiving critical acclaim from various fashion designers such as Victoria Beckham and wearing dresses from J'Aton Couture, Antonio Berardi, Dolce & Gabbana, Marchesa, Philip Armstrong, Carla Zampatti, Gucci and Aurelio Costarella and has featured on fashion magazines like Cosmopolitan, InStyle and Vogue. The press in Britain have especially taken notice of her sense of fashion and different hairstyles since Cheryl Cole joined The X Factor in 2008 often comparing both of them. The praise Minogue got from the tabloids on The X Factor led her to set up her own fashion label with Tabitha Somerset-Webb called Project D, as well as a fragrance. The first line of Project D was sold exclusively by Selfridges in the United Kingdom, the Spring/Summer line was showcased by Minogue during the live first Sunday night show of The X Factor Season 7, wearing her Jingle prom-style dress. In August 2012, the label was rebranded and relaunched as Project D London. In May 2013, Minogue announced that she would no longer be associated with Project D, ending a three-year collaboration with Somerset-Webb.

In late July 2011, it was announced that Minogue would serve as the ambassador for 2011's Melbourne Spring Fashion Week, a role that will see Minogue participate in a series of appearances in September. In 2014, Minogue continued her expansion into the fashion world by launching her own ecommerce store fashion saga. In addition, Minogue announced the launch of her petite clothing line through Target Australia. To date, Minogue has released six Dannii For Target Petites Collection ranges along with a range of shoes and accessories.

Dannii has her own fashion range which she promotes and sells through QVCUK called Dannii Minogue.

=== Endorsements ===
Minogue has been a global ambassador for Etihad Airways since 2008. It was confirmed that Minogue would be one of the new faces of Marks and Spencer. She filmed her first commercial in South Africa, which featured Cheryl Lynn's "Got to be Real", for their Spring campaign that aired 24 March 2010. She starred alongside Twiggy, Lisa Snowdon, VV Brown and Ana Beatriz Barros. Minogue didn't feature in the Autumn ad due to her pregnancy, she did feature in the Christmas ad with Peter Kay which featured the Bee Gees' "You Should Be Dancing". Minogue travelled to Miami, Florida in January 2011 to shoot the commercial for M&S for the 2011 Spring collection. Minogue is a former face of world-famous cosmetics brand ModelCo, appearing in ad campaigns for the company. On 5 April 2015 Minogue was announced as the 2015 Style Ambassador for Westfield Australia. In January 2017, Minogue was announced as an Ambassador for L'Oréal Australia.

=== Writing ===
In 2010, Minogue released her autobiography, My Story. The following year she released a fashion book titled My Style.

== Personal life ==
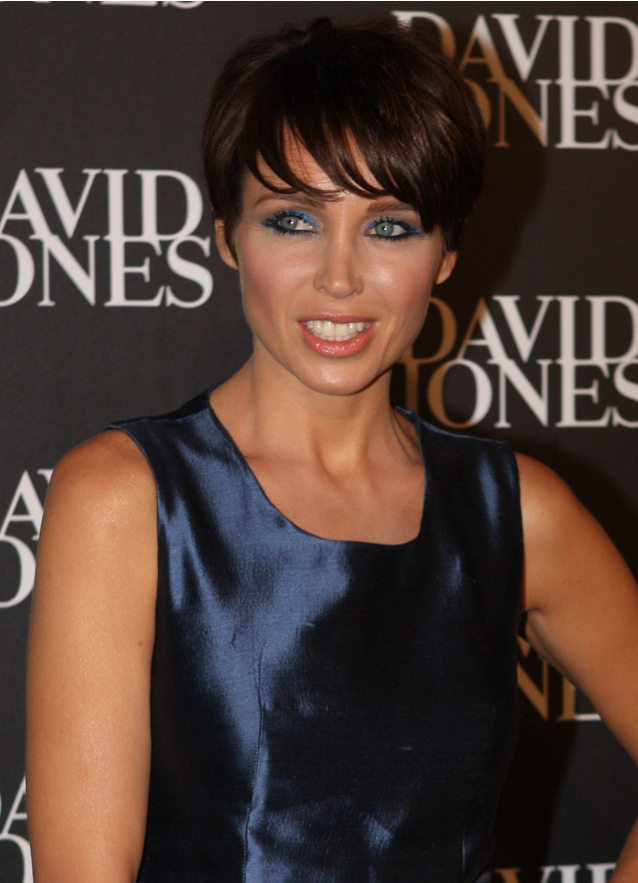
Minogue in 2012

=== Relationships ===
In January 1994, Minogue married actor Julian McMahon, whom she met in 1990 while working on the television series Home and Away. McMahon was the son of the former Prime Minister of Australia Sir William McMahon and Lady McMahon. Minogue and McMahon were married for less than two years and divorced in 1995. Minogue stated that McMahon's mother, Lady Sonia McMahon threatened not to attend their wedding and caused a rift. In October 1995, Minogue posed nude in the Australian edition of Playboy. Commenting on the reason she posed nude, Minogue said she "just had a marriage break-up. Most women go to the hairdressers – I did Playboy. I chose the photographer, the location, what I did or didn't want to wear, and everything else about the pictures. I found it a really liberating, empowering experience." She later said that she had posed for the money, saying that she was broke following her divorce. In October 1999, Minogue became engaged to 1997 Formula 1 World Champion Jacques Villeneuve, but their relationship ended in 2001.

In early 2002, she began dating music producer and Bros bassist Craig Logan, whom she met while recording material for Neon Nights. Media reports in March 2002 claimed Minogue and Logan were engaged, but in December 2002 they ended their relationship.

In August 2008, Minogue began dating English model and former professional rugby league player Kris Smith. They met in Ibiza, where Smith was celebrating his 30th birthday. On 9 January 2010, it was announced that Minogue was pregnant; the news was revealed after receiving her 12-week scan. Minogue gave birth via caesarean section to an 8 lb 3oz/4 kg boy, at Royal Women's Hospital in Melbourne, Victoria, Australia on 5 July 2010. She had previously planned for a home birth. In April 2012, Minogue announced on Twitter that she and Smith had separated.

In May 2024, after Minogue stated "I identify as queer in a weird way," it was widely reported that Minogue had come out as queer; however, Minogue later clarified in an Instagram post that she is straight.

=== Politics ===
In 2002, the British National Party (BNP), a far-right and anti-immigration political party, falsely claimed that Minogue supported their cause following comments she had made in an interview with Britain's GQ. In the interview, Minogue was quoted saying that French National Front leader Jean-Marie Le Pen had "struck a chord with people". Minogue responded saying that she had been misquoted and was "mortified" to be associated with the party adding that "Australia is the most multicultural melting pot of people. I'm completely proud of that." Minogue responded to the British National Party's claims in Gay Times magazine saying, "I am not a racist. That is not how I live my life. I have a Jewish manager, I perform in gay clubs, I come from a multicultural background and I am very proud of that."

=== Media portrayal and other activities ===
Throughout her career, Minogue has often been compared with her sister, Kylie, whose career has been more successful. Referring to the comparison, Minogue said: "[I]t is hard to be compared all the time to Kylie. On the other hand, however, people will always try to compare you to somebody. Look at Britney and Christina." In an interview with Elle in April 2009, Kylie criticised X Factor judge Louis Walsh for his jibes at her sister: "I'm so proud of my sister and it annoys the hell out of me when comparisons between us are made. In the UK, you lot don't know where she came from. She was on TV every week from 7 years old. It makes it harder for her when she gets Louis Walsh's rather pathetic jibes – one of which is she hasn't had a hit record and that's just not true." She also denied rumours that she did not get along with Cheryl Cole and that she had referred to former judge Sharon Osbourne as "so cheap".

Like her sister, Minogue has a sizeable gay following and has performed multiple times at the Sydney Gay and Lesbian Mardi Gras and the London nightclub G-A-Y. She credits her gay following for much of her success, commenting that gay culture has "always been a part of [her] music". Minogue openly supports gay rights causes for social equality and believes that same-sex marriages should be accepted by all governments.

Minogue is an ambassador for the Terrence Higgins Trust, an organisation that works to increase awareness of AIDS. She joined the charity in hope that her endorsement would encourage people to discuss safe sex and the disease more openly. In 2004 she posed nude, wrapped only in a red ribbon, to promote World AIDS Day in Australia and the UK. She has long been a supporter of breast cancer research and in August 2008 became an ambassador for the Olivia Newton-John Cancer and Wellness Centre Appeal.

=== Sport ===
Minogue is a basketball fan, supporting Melbourne United of the NBL and Southside Melbourne Flyers of the WNBL. She was courtside for all ten games during HoopsFest in Perth at RAC Arena in January 2026.

== Discography ==
- Dannii (1990)
- Love and Kisses (1991)
- Get into You (1993)
- Girl (1997)
- Neon Nights (2003)
- Club Disco (2007)

== Filmography ==
=== Television ===
Year	Title	Role	Notes
1979	Skyways	Amy	
1979	The Sullivans	Carla (#2)	5 episodes
1982–1988	Young Talent Time	Herself	Regular role
1983	Home	Herself	1 episode
1988	All The Way	Penny Seymour	
1989–1990	Home and Away	Emma Jackson	Regular role
1990–1999	Hey Hey It's Saturday	Herself	7 episodes
1991	Motormouth	Herself	3 episodes
1991	Royal Variety Command Performance	Herself - Performer	
1991	Celebrity Wheel of Fortune	Herself - Contestant	1 episode
1992, 1993	What's Up Doc?	Hersellf - Guest Presenter	2 episodes
1992–2004	Top of the Pops	Herself - Performer / Guest Presenter	13 episodes
1993	Parallel 9	Herself	1 episode
1993, 1996, 2011	A Current Affair	Herself	3 episodes
1994–1995	Fan TC	Herself - Presenter	
1994–1995	The Big Breakfast	Herself - Presenter	
1995	Hanging Out	Herself - Guest Presenter	2 episodes
1996	It's Not Just Saturday	Herself - Co-presenter	With Gareth Jones
1996	The Scoop	Herself - Presenter	8 episodes
1996	Zig and Zag's Dirty Deeds	Herself	Episode: "Comic Collision"
1997	Disney Time	Herself - Presenter	
1997–1998	Live & Kicking	Herself - Presenter	18 episodes, "Electric Circus" segments
1998	Scratchy & Co.	Herself	1 episode
2001	Star for a Night	Herself - Guest Judge	
2002	Wish You Were Here...?	Herself - Guest Presenter	1 episode
2002–2005	CD:UK	Herself	4 episodes
2003	Star Academy	Herself	1 episode
2005, 2007	Loose Women	Herself - Guest Panellist	Guest; 2 episodes
2007	The Kylie Show	Herself	Comedy sketch
2007–2010	The X Factor UK	Herself - Judge	Series 4–7
2007–2012	Australia's Got Talent	Herself - Judge	Seasons 1–6
2007, 2008, 2014	Ant & Dec's Saturday Night Takeaway	Herself - Guest Announcer	3 episodes
2008	Nickelodeon UK Kids Choice Awards 2008	Herself - Presenter	
2008	It Takes Two	Herself - Guest Judge	1 episode
2008	Blush: The Search for the Next Great Makeup Artist	Herself - Guest Judge	1 episode
2009	Beautiful People	Herself	Episode: "How I Got My Turner"
2010	Ultimate Movie Toons	Herself - Presenter	
2010	Piers Morgan's Life Stories	Herself	1 episode
2010	Dannii Minogue: Style Queen	Herself	Three-part documentary
2011	Dancing with the Stars	Herself - Guest Judge	1 episode
2011–2013	Project Runway Australia	Herself - Guest Judge	3 episodes
2012	The Talent Show Story	Herself	2 episodes
2013	Britain & Ireland's Next Top Model	Herself - Judge	Series 9
2013–2015	The X Factor Australia	Herself - Judge	Seasons 5–7
2013–2021	Have You Been Paying Attention?	Herself - Guest Panellist / Quizmaster	4 episodes
2017	Let It Shine	Herself - Judge	1 series
2018	Dance Boss	Herself - Presenter	Also executive producer
2018	Ultimate Beastmaster	Herself - Presenter	9 episodes
2019	Celebrity Name Game	Herself - Contestant	1 episode
2019–2021	The Masked Singer Australia	Herself - Judge	
2021	RuPaul's Drag Race Down Under	Herself - Special Guest	Season 1, episode 2
2022	This Is Your Life	Herself	1 episode
2023	Mushroom 50 Concert	Herself	TV Concert Special
2023–2025	I Kissed a Boy	Herself - Presenter	BBC Three dating show
2024, 2026	I Kissed a Girl	Herself - Presenter	BBC Three dating show
2025	Imposter	Amanda Metcalfe	2 episodes (TV Mini Series)
2026	A Melbourne Match	Host	TV Movie
2026	Kylie	Herself	Netflix documentary series

=== Film ===
Year	Film	Role	Notes
1992	Secrets / One Crazy Night	Didi	Lead role
2004	The Porter	Bunny Stigler	Short film
2007	White Diamond: A Personal Portrait of Kylie Minogue	Herself	Documentary film
2016	Molly: The Real Thing	Herself	Documentary film
2022	Seriously Red	Herself	Uncredited

=== DVDs ===
Year	Title	Role
2007	Dannii Minogue: The Video Collection	Herself

== Books written ==
- My Story (autobiography) (2010)
- My Style (fashion book) (2011)

== Awards and nominations ==
Year	Award	Category	About	Result
2025	Attitude Awards	Ally Award	Herself	Won
2011	Glamour Women of the Year	TV Personality of the Year	Herself	Won
2010	No.1 Celeb of the Year	Celeb of the Year	Metro's Celeb of the Year	Won
2010	Max Factor 2010	World's Most Glam Celeb 2010	Herself	Runner-Up
2010	Elle Style Awards 2010	Best TV Star	Herself	Won
2009	Cosmopolitan Awards 2009	Ultimate TV Personality of the year	Herself	Won
2008	No.1 Celeb of the Year	Celeb of the Year	Metro's Celeb of the Year	Won
2007	Glamour Awards	TV Personality	Herself	Won
2007	National Television Awards	Most Popular Talent Show	The X Factor	Won
2004	WMC International Dance Music Awards	Best Hi-Energy / Euro Release	"I Begin to Wonder"	Nominated
2004	WMC International Dance Music Awards	Best Dance Artists	N/A	Nominated
2004	Dancestar 2004 Awards	Best Worldwide Single	"I Begin to Wonder"	Nominated
2003	ARIA Awards	Best Pop Release	Neon Nights	Nominated
2003	Capital FM Awards	Capital Rhythm Award	N/A	Won
2003	Disney Channel Awards	Best Female Artist	N/A	Won
2001	Maxim Awards	Best Stage Performance	Notre-Dame De Paris	Won
1998	MO Award	Best Female Musical Theater Performer	Rizzo in Grease: The Arena Spectacular	Nominated
1998	BRMB Music Awards	Best Video	"All I Wanna Do"	Won
1991	TV Hits Magazine	Best Female TV Star	N/A	Won
1991	Smash Hits Poll Winners Party	Best New Artist	N/A	Won
1991	BIG Magazine	World's Best Female Pop Star	N/A	Won
1991	Radio One & Flash Forward Magazine	#1 Woman of the Year	N/A	Won
1990	Logie Awards	Most Popular Female Talent	Home and Away	Nominated
1989	Logie Awards	Most Popular Female Talent	Home and Away	Nominated
1989	The Variety Club of Australia	Young Variety Award	N/A	Won
