= Jump to the Beat =

1980 single by Stacy Lattisaw

Single by Stacy Lattisaw

from the album Let Me Be Your Angel
- B-side: "You Don't Love Me Anymore"
- Released: May 13, 1980
- Length: 5:20
- Label: Atlantic; Cotillion
- Songwriters: Narada Michael Walden; Lisa Walden
- Producer: Narada Michael Walden

Stacy Lattisaw singles chronology
"When You're Young and in Love" (1979)	"Jump to the Beat" (1980)	"Dynamite!" (1980)

"Jump to the Beat" is a song written by Narada Michael Walden and Lisa Walden. It was originally released by American singer Stacy Lattisaw in 1980, when it reached number three on the UK singles chart. It was later covered by Australian singer Dannii Minogue on her debut album, Love and Kisses, in 1991. Bob Stanley noted the similarity between Lattisaw's recording and the musical style of Madonna, some four years later.

== Release ==
Stacy Lattisaw was only 13 years old when "Jump to the Beat" was released in May 1980. Although it was not released as a North American single, and therefore did not chart on the Billboard Hot 100, it reached No. 1 (along with another song "Dynamite!") on the Billboard dance charts. Released in edited form as a single internationally, it became a big hit during the summer of 1980 in the UK, where it peaked at No. 3 in July. It was to be her only major hit there although she continued to achieve success in the US with later singles. The song also performed well in Europe, hitting the charts in a number of countries. The song was included on Lattsaw's second album, Let Me Be Your Angel.

== Charts ==
Weekly chart performance for "Jump to the Beat" by Stacy Lattisaw
Chart (1980–1981)	Peak position
Belgium (Joepie)	1
Belgium (Ultratop 50 Flanders)	7
Ireland (IRMA)	11
Netherlands (Dutch Top 40)	15
Netherlands (Single Top 100)	13
Sweden (Topplistan)	15
UK Singles (OCC)	3
US Hot Dance/Disco (Billboard)	1
West Germany (Media Control)	38

== Dannii Minogue version ==
"Jump to the Beat"

Single by Dannii Minogue

from the album Love and Kisses
- B-side: "Hallucination"
- Released: July 15, 1991
- Genre: Pop-house; dance
- Length: 3:36
- Label: Mushroom; MCA
- Songwriters: Narada Michael Walden; Lisa Walden
- Producers: Les Adams; Emma Freilich; Andy Whitmore

Dannii Minogue Australian singles chronology
"I Don't Wanna Take This Pain" (1990)	"Jump to the Beat" (1991)	"Baby Love" (1991)

Dannii Minogue European singles chronology
"Success" (1991)	"Jump to the Beat" (1991)	"Baby Love" (1991)

Music video
- "Jump to the Beat" on YouTube

Australian singer Dannii Minogue released a cover of "Jump to the Beat" in 1991. Her version was produced by Les Adams, Emma Freilich (L.A. Mix) and Andy Whitmore and received a mixed reception from music critics. It was released as the third single from her debut album, Love and Kisses in the third quarter of 1991 by Mushroom and MCA Records. The song reached the top five in Ireland and the top ten in the United Kingdom, and became Minogue's second top ten single. In Australia, the song did not perform as well, charting outside the top forty. In North America, the single was released as Minogue's debut release in November 1991; however, it failed to generate much interest outside of the United Kingdom, Australia and Israel. The accompanying music video was directed by Australian film director, screenwriter and cinematographer Paul Goldman.

=== Critical reception ===
Larry Flick from Billboard magazine wrote, "Kylie's younger sister bows with a hyper pop/house jam that is fueled with a fun, sing-along chorus and a groove that should easily rope in programmers at both club and crossover radio levels. Rap by Einstein is miscellaneous, while Minogue's chirpy voice endears." Marc Andrews from Smash Hits named the song one of the highlights on the Love and Kisses album, describing it as a "dance-fantastic single". Retrospectively, Matthew Hocter from Albumism noted that "with a clearer focus on that New Jack Swing sound" and the addition of some "heavy on house music" covers "Jump to the Beat" and "Baby Love", "the younger Minogue demonstrated that she had a very soulful approach to music." John Lucas from AllMusic named the song "a fairly perfunctory cover".

=== Track listings ===
- Australian CD single
1. "Jump to the Beat" (album version)
2. "Jump to the Beat" (extended mix)
3. "Hallucination"
- Australian cassette single
1. "Jump to the Beat"
2. "Jump to the Beat" (LP edit)
- UK vinyl single
1. "Jump to the Beat" (extended mix)
2. "Hallucination"
3. "Success" (Funky Tony mix)
- UK cassette single
1. "Jump to the Beat"
2. "Jump to the Beat" (LP edit)
- European CD single
1. "Jump to the Beat"
2. "Hallucination"
3. "Success" (Funky Tony dub)
- Australian 12-inch vinyl single
1. "Jump to the Beat" (extended mix)
2. "Hallucination"
3. "Success" (Funky Tony mix)
- US vinyl single
1. "Jump to the Beat" (12-inch mix)
2. "Hallucination"
3. "Jump to the Beat" (7-inch mix)
- US CD single
1. "Jump to the Beat" (7-inch version)
2. "Jump to the Beat" (7-inch remix)
3. "Jump to the Beat" (12-inch version)
4. "Hallucination"
- Japanese single
1. "Jump to the Beat" (7-inch mix)
2. "Jump to the Beat" (album version)

=== Personnel ===
- Dannii Minogue – lead vocals
- Colin "Einstein" Case – rap vocals
- Les Adams, Emma Freilich, Andy Whitmore – production
- Phil Bodger – remix, additional production
- Simon Fowler – photography

=== Charts ===
Weekly chart performance for "Jump to the Beat" by Dannii Minogue
Chart (1991)	Peak position
Australia (ARIA)	48
Belgium (Ultratop 50 Flanders)	44
Europe (Eurochart Hot 100)	19
Ireland (IRMA)	5
Israel (Israeli Singles Chart)	12
Luxembourg (Radio Luxembourg)	5
UK Singles (Official Charts)	8
UK Airplay (Music Week)	14
UK Dance (Music Week)	29

=== Release history ===
Release history and formats for "Jump to the Beat" by Dannii Minogue
Region	Date	Format(s)	Label(s)	Ref.
United Kingdom	July 15, 1991	—N/a	MCA	
Japan	September 21, 1991	Mini-CD	Alfa	
Australia	September 30, 1991	CD; cassette	Mushroom	
