= Baby Love (Regina song) =

1986 single by Regina

- Artwork for US 7-inch vinyl single

Single by Regina

from the album Curiosity
- Released: May 13, 1986
- Genre: Pop; R&B; dance
- Length: 4:06 (7-inch); 6:35 (12-inch)
- Label: Atlantic
- Songwriters: Stephen Bray; Regina Richards; Mary Kessler
- Producer: Stephen Bray

Regina singles chronology
"Baby Love" (1986)	"Beat of Love (Remix)" (1986)

"Baby Love" is a song by American singer Regina from the album Curiosity. The single topped the US dance chart for two weeks in mid-1986. The single crossed over to the pop singles chart, where it peaked at number 10 on US Billboard Hot 100 and at number 30 on the Billboard Soul Singles chart. "Baby Love" would be her only single to chart on both the Pop and Soul Singles charts, but several follow up singles charted on the dance chart.

== Background ==
The song was written by Stephen Bray, Regina Richards and Mary Kessler. Bray had written several hits with Madonna, and "Baby Love" was actually intended for her to record. After she declined, Regina recorded the vocal herself in late 1985, though with Bray's production it sounded similar to Madonna's other recordings of the time and was sometimes mistaken for one.

Although recorded the same year, the first released version of the song was by Dutch girl group The Star Sisters, who released it on their 1985 album Danger.

== Music video ==
A music video for "Baby Love" featuring Regina was created on February 12, 1986, by West 78th Street Records in collaboration with Hugmynd and Saga Film to promote the single.

== Charts ==
=== Weekly charts ===
Weekly chart performance for "Baby Love" by Regina
Chart (1986–1987)	Peak position
Canada Top Singles (RPM)	20
France (SNEP)	30
UK Singles (OCC)	50
US Billboard Hot 100	10
US 12-inch Singles Sales (Billboard)	3
US Dance/Disco Club Play (Billboard)	1
US Hot Black Singles (Billboard)	30

=== Year-end charts ===
Year-end chart performance for "Baby Love" by Regina
Chart (1986)	Rank
US Billboard Hot 100	85

== Dannii Minogue version ==
"Baby Love"

Single by Dannii Minogue

from the album Love and Kisses
- Released: October 7, 1991
- Genre: House
- Length: 4:42 (album version); 3:46 (Silky 70's 7-inch edit); 6:33 (12-inch version)
- Label: Mushroom; MCA
- Songwriters: Stephen Bray; Regina Richards; Mary Kessler
- Producers: Les Adams; Emma Freilich; Andy Whitmore

Dannii Minogue Australian singles chronology
"Jump to the Beat" (1991)	"Baby Love" (1991)	"Show You the Way to Go" (1992)

Dannii Minogue European singles chronology
"Jump to the Beat" (1991)	"Baby Love" (1991)	"I Don't Wanna Take This Pain" (1991)

"Baby Love" was covered by Australian singer Dannii Minogue for her debut album, Love and Kisses (1991). Minogue recorded her version for the European release of her album and its original pop mix can be found on the single released by MCA, Universal and Mushroom Records. The song was produced by Les Adams, Emma Freilich and Andy Whitmore. The remix by Steve "Silk" Hurley was released in October 1991 as the fourth single. It reached the top 20 in Ireland and the United Kingdom, becoming Minogue's fourth top 20 single. In Australia, the song charted within the top 30. The remixes of the song done by Hurley were successful in dance clubs and are credited with giving Minogue a new sound and image.

=== Critical reception ===
In a retrospective review, Matthew Hocter from Albumism noted that "with a clearer focus on that New Jack Swing sound" and the addition of some "heavy on house music" covers "Jump to the Beat" and "Baby Love", "the younger Minogue demonstrated that she had a very soulful approach to music." John Lucas from AllMusic named the song "a genuinely credible early-'90s house music number". Upon the release, Mark Frith from Smash Hits commented, "...this is Dannii's foray into the world of soul music. She obviously fancies herself as some sort of soul diva and she manages to pass herself off as one quite efficiently. As a result, 'Baby Love' works quite well."

=== Formats and track listings ===
- CD single (Europe and Australia) (D11077)
1. "Baby Love" (Silky 70's edit)
2. "Baby Love" (Silky 70's 12-inch mix)
3. "Baby Love" (Maurice's House remix)
- Cassette single (C11077)
1. "Baby Love" (Silky 70's edit)
2. "Baby Love" (Maurice's House remix)
- Vinyl single (X14345)
1. "Baby Love" (Silky 70's edit)
2. "Baby Love" (Maurice's House remix)
3. "Baby Love" (Maurice's House Mo Dub 4 Ya mix)

=== Personnel ===
- Dannii Minogue – lead vocals
- Les Adams, Emma Freilich, Andy Whitmore – production
- Steve 'Silk' Hurley – remix, additional production
- Simon Fowler – photography

=== Charts ===
Weekly chart performance for "Baby Love" by Dannii Minogue
Chart (1991)	Peak position
Australia (ARIA)	26
Europe (Eurochart Hot 100)	36
Ireland (IRMA)	18
Luxembourg (Radio Luxembourg)	11
UK Singles (Official Charts)	14
UK Airplay (Music Week)	10
UK Dance (Music Week)	10
UK Club Chart (Record Mirror)	13

=== Release history ===
Release dates and formats for "Baby Love" by Dannii Minogue
Region	Date	Format(s)	Label(s)	Ref.
United Kingdom	October 7, 1991	7-inch vinyl; 12-inch vinyl; cassette	MCA	
Japan	December 21, 1991	CD	Alfa International	
Australia	February 10, 1992	12-inch vinyl; CD; cassette	Mushroom	
