= Love and Kisses (song) =

1990 single by Dannii Minogue

- European cover

Single by Dannii Minogue

from the album Love and Kisses
- B-side: "Work"
- Released: February 1990
- Genre: Dance-pop
- Length: 3:45
- Label: Mushroom; MCA
- Songwriter: Alvin Moody
- Producers: Alvin Moody; Vincent Bell; Dancin' Danny D

Dannii Minogue singles chronology
"Love and Kisses" (1990)	"Success" (1990)

Music video
- "Love and Kisses" on YouTube

"Love and Kisses" is a dance-pop song performed by Australian singer Dannii Minogue. The song was written by Alvin Moody, and produced by Moody, Vincent Bell and Dancin' Danny D for Minogue's debut album Love and Kisses (1991). It was released by Mushroom and MCA Records as Minogue's debut single in February 1990 in Australia and on 18 March 1991 in the United Kingdom. It entered the top 10 in the UK and Australia. The accompanying music video was directed by Paul Goldman and Craig Griffin.

== Background ==
Six months after signing a recording contract with Mushroom Records in Australia, Minogue traveled to New York City to begin recording songs for her debut album. While in the United States, she worked with record producers Alvin Moody and Vincent Bell. The recording studio, located in Brooklyn, had been the site of several shootings. This made it difficult for Minogue to get to it because taxicab drivers would not drive her there. Minogue found the recording experience in New York City both "awesome" and "terrifying". Minogue chose to record "Love and Kisses" because of its American R&B influences. She "didn't want it to sound like all the other pop records in [Australia] at the time".

== Critical reception ==
In a review for AllMusic, John Lucas called the song "an entertaining piece of fluff", but wrote that "it has dated badly, particularly the cringe-worthy rap section". In their review of the Love and Kisses album, Billboard magazine wrote that songs like "Love and Kisses" "surround her chirpy voice with contagious beats and melodies that should sound just dandy on top 40 radio."

== Chart performance ==
"Love and Kisses" was released in Australia in February 1990. The song debuted on the ARIA Singles Chart at number 40 on 11 March 1990. It reached number four six weeks later and remained on the top 100 chart for 20 weeks, being certified gold. The single also reached number 15 in New Zealand, staying on the chart for seven weeks. In the United Kingdom, "Love and Kisses" was released on 18 March 1991. It reached number eight on the UK Singles Chart and number 22 on the Irish Singles Chart. In Belgium, the track reached number 48.

== Music video ==
The music video for "Love and Kisses" was directed by Paul Goldman and Craig Griffin. The video features Minogue dancing in front of a white background with a group of dancers. It begins with close-up images of Minogue, dressed in a leather outfit. She is then shown with a group of dancers dancing in front of a changing backdrop. Black-and-white scenes of Minogue singing by herself are intercut throughout. It was released commercially on The Videos in 1996 and The Hits & Beyond special edition companion DVD in 2006.

== Formats and track listings ==
- Australian cassingle
1. "Love and Kisses"
2. "Work"
- Australian naxi-cassingle
1. "Love and Kisses" (Hectic Mix)
2. "Love and Kisses" (House Mix)
3. "Love and Kisses" (Funky Mix)
4. "Work"
- Australian CD single
1. "Love and Kisses" (Hectic Mix)
2. "Love and Kisses" (House Mix)
3. "Work"
4. "Love and Kisses
- Australian 7-inch vinyl single
1. "Love and Kisses"
2. "Work"
- Australian 12-inch vinyl single
1. "Love and Kisses" (Hectic Mix)
2. "Love and Kisses" (House Mix - Edit)
3. "Work"
- Australian 12-inch vinyl "Remix" single
1. "Love and Kisses" (House Mix)
2. "Love and Kisses" (Funky Mix)
3. "Work"
- UK 7-inch vinyl single
1. "Love and Kisses"
2. "Love and Kisses" (Instrumental)
- Japanese 3-inch CD single
1. "Love and Kisses"
2. "Work"

== Personnel ==
- Dannii Minogue – lead vocals
- Alvin Moody – production
- Vincent Bell – production
- Dancin' Danny D – remix, additional production
- Phil Bodger – engineering
- Paul Cox – photography

== Charts ==
=== Weekly charts ===
Chart (1990–1991)	Peak position
Australia (ARIA)	4
Belgium (Ultratop 50 Flanders)	48
Europe (Eurochart Hot 100)	25
Ireland (IRMA)	22
Israel (Israeli Singles Chart)	12
Luxembourg (Radio Luxembourg)	13
New Zealand (Recorded Music NZ)	15
UK Singles (OCC)	8
UK Airplay (Music Week)	13

=== Year-end charts ===
Chart (1990)	Position
Australia (ARIA)	54

Chart (1991)	Position
UK Singles (OCC)	99

== Certifications ==
Region	Certification	Certified units/sales
Australia (ARIA)	Gold	35,000^{^}
^{^} Shipments figures based on certification alone.
