= I Don't Wanna Take This Pain =

1990 single by Dannii Minogue

- Australian artwork (1990)

Single by Dannii Minogue

from the album Love and Kisses
- Released: 3 December 1990
- Length: 4:53
- Label: Mushroom; MCA
- Songwriters: Dannii Minogue; Alvin Moody; Vincent Bell; Eric Isles
- Producers: Les Adams; Emma Freilich

Dannii Minogue Australian singles chronology
"Success" (1990)	"I Don't Wanna Take This Pain" (1990)	"Jump to the Beat" (1991)

Dannii Minogue European singles chronology
"Baby Love" (1991)	"I Don't Wanna Take This Pain" (1991)	"Show You the Way to Go" (1992)

Alternative covers
- UK artwork (1991)

Music video
- "I Don't Wanna Take This Pain" on YouTube

"I Don't Wanna Take This Pain" is a single by Australian singer Dannii Minogue from her debut album, Love and Kisses (1991). A personal favourite of Minogue's, its original mix was released as the third single in Australia, where it peaked at number 92 on the ARIA Singles Chart December 1990. A re-recorded and remixed version of the song (by L.A. Mix) was released in the United Kingdom as the fifth and final single in December 1991 and received mostly positive reviews from music critics. "I Don't Wanna Take This Pain" reached number 40 in the UK.

== Critical reception ==
In their review of the Love and Kisses album, Billboard magazine wrote that songs like "I Don't Wanna Take This Pain" "surround her chirpy voice with contagious beats and melodies that should sound just dandy on top 40 radio." Rozalla Miller reviewed the song for Smash Hits, adding "...her voice sounds much better on this record than it does on her other ones. It's pretty good, but it's not as catchy as 'Baby Love'."

== Track listings ==
- Australian cassingle (C10129; Released in November 1990)
1. "I Don't Wanna Take This Pain" (7-inch version)
2. "Love Traffic"
- Australian 7-inch vinyl single (K10129; Released in November 1990)
1. "I Don't Wanna Take This Pain" (7-inch version) – 3:23
2. "Love Traffic"
- Australian 12-inch vinyl single (X14933; Released in November 1990)
1. "I Don't Wanna Take This Pain" (extended mix)
2. "I Don't Wanna Take This Pain" (instrumental)
3. "Love Traffic" (album mix)
- UK CD single (MCSTD1600; Released on 2 December 1991)
1. "I Don't Wanna Take This Pain" (L.A. Mix 7-inch version) – 3:23
2. "I Don't Wanna Take This Pain" (12-inch version) – 6:04
3. "Jump to the Beat" (12-inch version) – 6:42
4. "Baby Love" (E Smooves 12-inch mix) – 6:38

== Personnel ==
- Dannii Minogue – lead vocals
- Les Adams – L.A. Mix production
- Emma Freilich – L.A. Mix production
- Simon Fowler – photography

== Charts ==
Chart performance for "I Don't Wanna Take This Pain"
Chart (1990–1991)	Peak position
Australia (ARIA)	92
UK Singles (Official Charts)	40
UK Airplay (Music Week)	50
UK Club Chart (Record Mirror)	66

== Release history ==
Release history and formats for "I Don't Wanna Take This Pain"
Region	Date	Format(s)	Label(s)	Ref.
Australia	3 December 1990	7-inch vinyl; 12-inch vinyl; cassette	Mushroom	
United Kingdom	2 December 1991	7-inch vinyl; 12-inch vinyl; CD; cassette	MCA	
