= Success (Dannii Minogue song) =

- Australian artwork

Single by Dannii Minogue

from the album Love and Kisses
- Released: 3 September 1990
- Genre: Dance-pop
- Length: 3:42
- Label: Mushroom; MCA
- Songwriters: Dannii Minogue; Alvin Moody
- Producers: Alvin Moody; Vincent Bell; Bruce Forest (remix)

Dannii Minogue Australian singles chronology
"Love and Kisses" (1990)	"Success" (1990)	"I Don't Wanna Take This Pain" (1990)

Dannii Minogue European singles chronology
"Love and Kisses" (1991)	"Success" (1991)	"Jump to the Beat" (1991)

Alternative cover
- European artwork

Music video
- "Success" on YouTube

"Success" (also stylised as "$ucce$$") is a song by the Australian singer Dannii Minogue. The song was written by Minogue and Alvin Moody, and produced by Moody and Vincent Bell for Minogue's debut album, Love and Kisses (1991). It was released by Mushroom Records and MCA as Minogue's second single in September 1990 in Australia. In May 1991, it was remixed and released in the United Kingdom. The song's lyrics discuss the highs and lows of being a celebrity. It entered the top 40 in Australia, Ireland, and the UK. Minogue performed the song when she was invited to perform on The Royal Variety Show in front of Queen Elizabeth II. The accompanying music video was directed by Paul Goldman and Craig Griffin.

== Background ==
Six months after signing a recording contract with Mushroom Records in Australia, Minogue traveled to New York City to begin recording songs for her debut album. While in the United States, she worked with record producers Alvin Moody and Vincent Bell. The recording studio, located in Brooklyn, had been the site of several shootings. This made it difficult for Minogue to get to it because taxicab drivers would not drive her there. Minogue found the recording experience in New York City both "awesome" and "terrifying". "Success" was the first song Minogue co-wrote and its lyrics discuss the highs and lows of being a celebrity.

== Critical reception ==
In a review for AllMusic, John Lucas called the song "rather dated" and said "its aspirational lyrics became something of an albatross for Minogue given her struggle to achieve the career momentum of her sister". Larry Flick from Billboard magazine wrote, "Aussie vixen takes another shot at a U.S. club hit with a beat-savvy pop/house confection." He complimented Minogue's "chirpy delivery and the song's contagious nature." Caroline Sullivan from Smash Hits commented, "This is a groovy little piece of bouncebeat, like some superior Janet Jackson number. You know the video is going to have loads of dancing, with Daniel flinging herself hither and yon, and it'll be bee-rilliant."

== Chart performance ==
"Success" was officially released in Australia on 3 September 1990, debuting on the ARIA Singles Chart at number 51 for the week ending 16 September 1990. The song peaked at number 28 in its fifth week on the chart and spent 11 weeks in the top 100.

In the United Kingdom, "Success" was released on 6 May 1991, debuting at number 21 on the UK Singles Chart. Two weeks later, the song reached its peak of number 11 and remained there for three consecutive weeks. In Ireland, the track reached number 15 on the Irish Singles Chart.

== Music video ==
The music video for "Success" was directed by Paul Goldman and Craig Griffin and filmed in Australia. The video features Minogue dancing and having her makeup done. It begins with Minogue dancing in a studio with four male dancers. She is then shown dancing by herself in front of a red background. Scenes of Minogue having her makeup applied, a young boy dressed as a boxer and her dancers practicing are intercut throughout.

Minogue wanted the video to incorporate visual ideas from the Australian nightclub scene. While conducting research for the video, she saw "these brilliant kids dancing" and asked them to be a part of the video. The video was released commercially on The Videos in 1996 and The Hits & Beyond special edition companion DVD in 2006.

== Formats and track listings ==
- Australian 7-inch and cassette single
1. "Success"
2. "Success" (Instrumental)
- Australian maxi-cassette single
1. "Success" (Filthy Lucre mix)
2. "Success" (Rich'n'Real mix)
3. "Success" (Expensive mix)
4. "Success" (instrumental)
- Australian CD single
1. "Success"
2. "Success" (instrumental)
3. "Success" (Filthy Lucre mix)
4. "Success" (Rich'n'Real mix)
5. "Success" (Expensive mix)
- Australian 12-inch single
1. "Success" (Filthy Lucre mix)
2. "Success" (Rich'n'Real mix)
3. "Success" (instrumental)
- UK CD single
1. "Success"
2. "Success" (12-inch version)
3. "Success" (Funky Tony dub)

== Personnel ==
- Dannii Minogue – lead vocals
- Alvin Moody, Vincent Bell – production
- Bruce Forest – remix, additional production
- Paul Cox – photography

== Charts ==
Weekly chart performance for "Success"
Chart (1990–1991)	Peak position
Australia (ARIA)	28
Belgium (Ultratop 50 Flanders)	41
Europe (Eurochart Hot 100)	38
Ireland (IRMA)	15
Israel (Israeli Singles Chart)	14
Luxembourg (Radio Luxembourg)	5
UK Singles (Official Charts)	11
UK Airplay (Music Week)	16

== Release history ==
Release history and formats for "Success"
Region	Date	Format(s)	Label(s)	Ref.
Australia	3 September 1990	7-inch vinyl; cassette	Mushroom	
Australia	24 September 1990	12-inch vinyl; maxi-cassette	Mushroom	
Australia	1 October 1990	CD	Mushroom	
United Kingdom	7 May 1991	7-inch vinyl; 12-inch vinyl; cassette	MCA	
Japan	21 July 1991	Mini-CD	Alfa	
