= The Hits & Beyond =

Greatest hits album by Dannii Minogue
- Released: 19 June 2006
- Recorded: 1989–2006
- Studio: Various
- Genre: Dance-pop; electropop; house; trance; nu-disco
- Length: 74:11
- Label: All Around the World; Universal
- Producer: Lee Monteverde; Soul Seekerz; Flower Power; Neimo & Al Stone; Korpi & Blackcell; Riva; Flexifinger; Metro; Brian Higgins & Matt Gray; Tim Lever; Mike Percy; Steve "Silk" Hurley; Les Adams; Emma Freilich; Andy Whitmore; Alvin Moody; Vincent Bell; Dancin' Danny D

Dannii Minogue chronology
| Neon Nights (2003) | The Hits & Beyond (2006) | Unleashed (2007) |

Singles from The Hits & Beyond
- 1. "So Under Pressure" Released: 12 June 2006

Professional ratings
Review scores
| Source | Rating |
|---|---|
| AllMusic | 4/5 stars |
| BBC | link |

The Hits & Beyond is the second greatest hits album by Australian singer Dannii Minogue. It was released by All Around the World Records on 16 June 2006 in Ireland and the United Kingdom on 19 June 2006. The album was then released by Central Station Records in New Zealand on 4 August 2006 and Australia on 7 August 2006.

The compilation is Minogue's first release with All Around the World Records and second greatest hits album; the first being the 1998 Australian-only budget release, The Singles. The Hits & Beyond consists of fifteen previously released singles making up the 'hits' and five new tracks representing the 'beyond'.

Most of the singles from her second album Get into You from 1993 were omitted. The compilation received moderate success in the UK, where it charted at number 17. The album's release was preceded by its lead single, "So Under Pressure".

== Background and composition ==
Minogue began working on her fifth studio album in 2004, which would be the follow-up to the successful Neon Nights. After a record company reshuffle, Minogue subsequently left her label London Records and signed with All Around the World where she continued to work on new material. This resulted in the track "You Won't Forget About Me", which was released as a single in 2004 and "Perfection", which was released the following year.

In 2006, after the success of the previous singles, All Around the World arranged to release a greatest hits compilation to launch before a studio album. Minogue was asked to come up with a new single to launch the compilation. After a writing session with Terry Ronald and producers LMC, the song "So Under Pressure" was conceived and subsequently released as the lead single from The Hits & Beyond in June 2006.

The fifteen previously released 'hits' are made up of Minogue's highest charting singles (UK Top 25), including four singles from her debut album Love and Kisses, one track from her second album Get into You, three singles from her third album Girl and all four singles from her fourth and most successful album, Neon Nights. The singles "You Won't Forget About Me", "Perfection" and "So Under Pressure" are also included. These would later be included on Minogue's fifth studio album, Club Disco.

The compilation is also supported by five new recordings, which represent the 'beyond'. This includes the single "I Can't Sleep at Night" which was released in January 2007. These tracks, along with the three previously released singles, were recorded as part of Club Disco, which would be released a year later.

== Release and promotion ==
Prior to the release of the compilation, Minogue promoted the album across Europe and Oceania. This included a series of television and radio appearances, club and festival gigs as well as in-store appearances. Throughout 2004 and 2005, Minogue appeared on CD:UK, Top of the Pops and Popworld as well as performing at club such as G-A-Y in London as support for the singles "You Won't Forget About Me" and "Perfection".

Upon the release of the album in 2006, Minogue appeared on BBC's Strictly Come Dancing and Popworld to perform "So Under Pressure". She also performed the track as well as other previously released singles at T4 on the Beach. Minogue also performed another gig at G-A-Y where her sister Kylie joined her on stage, handed her flowers and made a short speech before performing a short impromptu duet of "Jump to the Beat".

Minogue then went on a promotional trip to Australia where she appeared on Rove Live and on the breakfast-show Sunrise performing "So Under Pressure" and a Neon Nights medley. She also appeared on Mornings with Kerri-Anne performing "So Under Pressure" and the Afterlife Lounge Mix of "I Can't Sleep at Night". Minogue also performed at Home Night Club and made in-store appearances in Sydney and Melbourne.

== Critical reception ==
John Lucas of AllMusic stated that Minogue's earlier hits now "sound dated" but praised the Steve "Silk" Hurley-remixed "Baby Love".

He also noted the lack of tracks from the Get into You album and absence of singles such as the house infused "This Is the Way". He also praised her more recent singles, "All I Wanna Do", "Disremembrance", "Who Do You Love Now?", "Put the Needle on It" and "I Begin to Wonder", noting their significance on the compilation.

== Commercial and chart performance ==
The Hits & Beyond was released on 19 July 2006 in the UK and peaked at number 17 on the UK Albums Chart. The compilation was also released in Australia on 7 August 2006 by Central Station Records. It entered the charts on 14 August 2006 and peaked at No. 67 on the ARIA Chart.

== Track listing ==
The Hits & Beyond – Standard edition
| No. | Title | Writer(s) | Producer(s) | Length |
|---|---|---|---|---|
| 1. | "Put the Needle on It" | Dannii Minogue; Mathias Johansson; Henrik Korpi; Karen Poole | Korpi & Blackcell | 3:24 |
| 2. | "I Begin to Wonder" (radio version) | Minogue; Dacia Bridges; Olaf Kramolowsky; Jean-Claude Ades | J.C.A. | 3:28 |
| 3. | "So Under Pressure" | Minogue; Lee Monteverde; Michael Ward; Terry Ronald | Lee Monteverde | 3:51 |
| 4. | "You Won't Forget About Me" (vs. Flower Power) | Minogue; Pete Hammond; Andrea Jeannin; Steph Mazzacani; Bruce Elliott-Smith; Hannah Robinson | Flower Power | 3:43 |
| 5. | "All I Wanna Do" | Stuart McLennan; Tim Powell; Matt Gray; Brian Higgins | Matt Gray; Brian Higgins | 4:28 |
| 6. | "This Is It" | Van McCoy | Mike Percy; Tim Lever | 3:32 |
| 7. | "Don't Wanna Lose This Feeling" (radio version) | Ronald; Minogue; Bruno Alexandre; James Theochari | Al Stone | 3:32 |
| 8. | "Baby Love" (Silky 70's mix edit) | Regina Richards; Mary Kessler; Stephen Bray | Emma Freilich; Les Adams; Andy Whitmore | 4:10 |
| 9. | "Everything I Wanted" (radio edit) | Minogue; Steve Torch; Mark Taylor | Metro | 3:44 |
| 10. | "Disremembrance" (Flexifingers Radio Edit) | David Green; Ian Masterson | Flexifinger | 4:04 |
| 11. | "Jump to the Beat" (L.A. 7" mix) | Lisa Walden; Narada Michael Walden | Adams; Whitmore; Emma Freilich | 3:37 |
| 12. | "Love and Kisses" (Dancin' Danny D 7" mix) | Alvin Moody | Dancin' Danny D; Alvin Moody; Vincent Bell | 3:37 |
| 13. | "Success" (Bruce Forest 7" mix) | Minogue; Moody | Bruce Forest | 3:43 |
| 14. | "Perfection" (radio edit) | Minogue; Rob Davis; Grankvist; Simon Langford; Julian Napolitano | Soul Seekerz | 3:27 |
| 15. | "Who Do You Love Now?" | Jon Riva; Victoria Horn | Jon Riva | 3:53 |
| 16. | "Love Fight" | Minogue; Jake Schultz; Savan Kotecha | Jake Schultz; Carl Falk | 3:03 |
| 17. | "Sunrise" | Minogue; Jewels & Stone; Davis | Jewels & Stone; Rob Davis | 3:30 |
| 18. | "I Can't Sleep at Night" | Minogue; Davis; Jewels & Stone | Jewels & Stone | 3:25 |
| 19. | "Gone" | Minogue | Monteverde | 3:56 |
| 20. | "Good Times" | Minogue; Grankvist; George Nakas; Klas Wahl; Roger Olsson | Forty4s | 4:04 |
| Total length: | | | | 74:11 |

The Hits & Beyond – Special edition (bonus DVD)
| No. | Title | Director(s) | Length |
|---|---|---|---|
| 1. | "Love and Kisses" | Paul Goldman |
| 2. | "Success" | Goldman |
| 3. | "Jump to the Beat" | Goldman |
| 4. | "Baby Love" | Greg Masuak |
| 5. | "This Is It" | Willi Smax |
| 6. | "All I Wanna Do" | Paul Morgans |
| 7. | "Everything I Wanted" | Steve Shaw |
| 8. | "Disremembrance" | Joe Roman, Simon Cooper |
| 9. | "Who Do You Love Now?" | David Chaudoir |
| 10. | "Put The Needle on It" | Mikka Lommi |
| 11. | "I Begin to Wonder" | Phil Griffin |
| 12. | "Don't Wanna Lose This Feeling" | Griffin |
| 13. | "You Won't Forget About Me" (versus Flower Power) | Harvey & Carolyn |
| 14. | "Perfection" | Rob Kaplan |
| 15. | "So Under Pressure" | Griffin |
| 16. | "I Can't Sleep at Night" | Ulf Buddensieck |

Notes

- "Baby Love" is a new edit of the Silky 70's Mix.

== Charts ==
Chart performance for The Hits & Beyond
| Chart (2006) | Peak position |
|---|---|
| Australian Albums (ARIA) | 67 |
| Scottish Albums (OCC) | 21 |
| UK Albums (OCC) | 17 |

== Release history ==
Release history for The Hits & Beyond
| Country | Release date | Format(s) | Catalog# | Label | Ref |
|---|---|---|---|---|---|
| Ireland | 16 June 2006 | CD | N/A | All Around the World; Universal | |
| United Kingdom | 19 June 2006 | CD; DVD | 984 036-2 | All Around the World; Universal | |
| United Kingdom | 19 June 2006 | CD | 984 036-3 | All Around the World; Universal | |
| New Zealand | 4 August 2006 | CD | N/A | Central Station | |
| Australia | 7 August 2006 | CD | CSR CD 5363 | Central Station | |
| Australia | 7 August 2006 | CD; DVD | CSR CD 5364 | Central Station | |
