= Club Disco =

Studio album by Dannii Minogue
- Released: 5 November 2007
- Recorded: 2004–2007
- Genres: Dance-pop; house; disco; electropop
- Length: 73:51 (digital edition); 73:09 (AU physical edition)
- Labels: All Around the World; Central Station
- Producers: Thriller J; Jake Schulze; Rob Davis; Roger Sanchez; Lee Monteverde; Jewels & Stone; Flower Power; Soul Seekerz

Dannii Minogue chronology
Unleashed (2007)	Club Disco (2007)	The Early Years (2008)

Singles from Club Disco
- 1. "You Won't Forget About Me" Released: 25 October 2004; 2. "Perfection" Released: 17 October 2005; 3. "So Under Pressure" Released: 12 June 2006; 4. "I Can't Sleep at Night" Released: 8 January 2007; 5. "He's the Greatest Dancer" Released: 14 April 2007; 6. "Touch Me Like That" Released: 3 December 2007

Club Disco is the fifth studio album by Australian singer Dannii Minogue. It was released by All Around the World digitally on 5 November 2007 worldwide. It was also re-released in Australia on 27 May 2008 physically with the single "Touch Me Like That", and a bonus disc of club remixes. The album is heavily inspired by 1980s disco. Six singles were released from the album—"You Won't Forget About Me", "Perfection", "So Under Pressure", "I Can't Sleep at Night", "He's the Greatest Dancer" and "Touch Me Like That"—five of which reached number one on the UK Dance Chart.

== Album background ==
After the success of her previous album Neon Nights, Minogue was asked by All Around the World Records, a major dance label, if she would write the lyrics to a popular dance instrumental track called "Flower Power", which was a huge hit in clubs in Ibiza. Minogue agreed and wrote the lyrics to the song that would soon become "You Won't Forget About Me". About writing lyrics for the song, Minogue said: "I'd heard it without vocals and I thought, 'Fantastic'. I had already written loads of vocals for myself and knew I had something that would be perfect for it."

By 2005 sessions were well underway with Minogue writing and recording material with longtime collaborators Thriller Jill, J.C.A, who wrote her hit "I Begin to Wonder", and Roger Sanchez on the track "Do You Believe Me Now?" Sessions with The Location, Rob Davis, Jewels & Stone, and The Fourty4s also took place. The album took on the working title of Heavy Disco during this time after the line in the J.C.A.-produced "Feel Like I Do". In early 2005, The Location-produced "Love Fight" was considered for single release, before "I Can't Sleep at Night" was decided upon. The song received a video and remix treatment before being delayed in favour of a new collaboration with the Soul Seekerz on their instrumental track "Turn Me Upside Down". As a result, "Perfection" was released in October 2005 as the album's second single, becoming a dance hit and reaching number one on the UK Dance Chart.

During this time, All Around the World decided to release a hits compilation to support the upcoming album and Minogue's success on the dance music scene. In 2006, Minogue continued writing and recording material with British dance group LMC. During one of their sessions, they penned "So Under Pressure", which was inspired by the cancer diagnoses of her sister Kylie Minogue as well as that of an unnamed friend. Minogue has described the recording of "So Under Pressure" as a "real achievement" as she was "brave enough to put all [her feelings] into words". This song was used to launch the compilation The Hits & Beyond, which included fifteen previously released singles as well as some of the new material as a taster. One of these 'beyond' tracks was "I Can't Sleep at Night", which was released to digital retail outlets as the fourth single in January 2007.

At this time Minogue also recorded a cover of "He's the Greatest Dancer" as the charity single for that year's Children in Need; it was dropped when Minogue pulled out of Strictly Come Dancing to work on rival TV show The X Factor. The single was replaced in favour of a cover of "Downtown" former Spice Girl Emma Bunton had performed. In December 2006, the track was released to dance clubs in the United Kingdom. It was physically released in Australia by Central Station Records on 14 April 2007, with the UK only receiving a digital release. It was ultimately featured on the album along with another cover track, "Xanadu", which was initially recorded for a Departure Lounge compilation series.

The album, retitled Club Disco a reference to Minogue's hypocorism, "Disco", finally saw a release on 5 November 2007. It was initially only released to online music stores. In an interview Minogue stated the decision to release the album digitally, saying, "I'm always on the internet buying music so I always want to make it something good". The following month a collaboration with Jason Nevins, "Touch Me Like That", was released as a single. In 2008, Central Station, Minogue's Australian label, released the album physically featuring "Touch Me Like That", along with a bonus disc of club remixes.

== Critical reception ==
Professional ratings
Review scores
Source	Rating
AllMusic	3.5/5 stars

Jon O'Brien of AllMusic called the album "far more focused and less 'everything but the kitchen sink' than Kylie's recent X" although "unlikely to receive the exposure it deserves", which O'Brien felt was "a shame, as the majority of its 16 tracks suggest that if either she or her AATW record company had got their act together, Club Disco could have built on the momentum of its Top Ten predecessor" Neon Nights (2003). O'Brien commended Minogue's "winning formula of overlaying new vocals on already existing dance tracks" as on "You Won't Forget About Me", utilisation of samples on "Perfection" and "Touch Me Like That", cover of Sister Sledge's "He's the Greatest Dancer", as well as the "ethereal chilled-out" rework of "Xanadu".

== Track listing ==
Club Disco digital edition track listing
No.	Title	Writer(s)	Producer(s)	Length
1.	"Feel Like I Do"	Dannii Minogue; Jean-Claude Ades; Hannah Robinson	Jean-Claude Ades	3:51
2.	"Perfection" (with Soul Seekerz; Extended Mix)	Minogue; Rob Davis; Therese Grankvist; Julian Napolitano; Simon Langford; Peter Jackson; Gerald Jackson	Soul Seekerz	6:25
3.	"You Won't Forget About Me" (vs. Flower Power)	Minogue; Bruce Elliot-Smith; Peter Hammond; Stefano Mazzacani; Andrea Jeannin; Robinson	Flower Power	3:44
4.	"Love Fight"	Minogue; Savan Kotecha; Jake Schulze	The Location	3:05
5.	"I'm Sorry"	Minogue; Kotecha; Schulze; Carl Bjösell; Carl Falk; Sebastian Thott; Didrik Thott	The Location	3:25
6.	"Gone"	Minogue; Terry Ronald; Lee Monteverde; Michael Ward	LMC	3:57
7.	"So Under Pressure"	Minogue; Ronald; Monteverde; Ward	LMC	3:53
8.	"Good Times" (The Fourty4s' 7" Mix)	Minogue; Klas Wahl; Georgios Nakas; Carl Olsson; Grankvist; Per Stappe	The Fourty4s	4:09
9.	"Sunrise"	Julian Gingell; Barry Stone; Minogue; Davis	Jewels & Stone; Rob Davis	3:31
10.	"He's the Greatest Dancer"	Nile Rodgers; Bernard Edwards	LMC	3:05
11.	"I Can't Sleep at Night"	Gingell; Stone; Minogue; Davis	Jewels & Stone; Rob Davis	3:28
12.	"I Will Come to You"	Nina Woodford; Minogue; Davis	Rob Davis	3:54
13.	"I've Been Waiting for You"	Ian Masterson; Ronald; Minogue	Thriller Jill	4:36
14.	"Round the World"	Minogue; Masterson; Ronald	Thriller Jill	3:33
15.	"Do You Believe Me Now?" (with Roger Sanchez)	Roger Sanchez	Roger Sanchez	4:10
16.	"Xanadu"	Jeff Lynne	Thriller Jill	5:44
17.	"You Won't Forget About Me" (Afterlife Lounge Mix Edit)	Minogue; Elliot-Smith; Hammond; Mazzacani; Jeannin; Robinson	Flower Power	3:36
18.	"I Can't Sleep at Night" (Afterlife Lounge Mix)	Gingell; Stone; Minogue; Davis	Jewels & Stone; Rob Davis	5:44

Club Disco 7digital bundle version bonus videos
No.	Title	Director(s)	Length
19.	"So Under Pressure"	Phil Griffin
20.	"I Can't Sleep at Night"	Ulf Buddensieck
21.	"Perfection" (with Soul Seekerz)	Rob Kaplan
22.	"You Won't Forget About Me" (vs. Flower Power)	Harvey & Carolyn

Club Disco physical edition track listing
No.	Title	Writer(s)	Producer(s)	Length
1.	"Touch Me Like That" (vs. Jason Nevins)	Jason Nevins; Lisa Molina; Sylvester James; James Wirrick	Jason Nevins	3:28
2.	"Feel Like I Do"	Minogue; Ades; Robinson	Ades	3:51
3.	"Perfection" (with Soul Seekerz; Extended Mix)	Minogue; Davis; Grankvist; Napolitano; Langford; P. Jackson; G. Jackson	Soul Seekerz	6:25
4.	"You Won't Forget About Me" (vs. Flower Power)	Minogue; Smith; Hammond; Mazzacani; Jeannin; Robinson	Flower Power	3:44
5.	"Love Fight"	Minogue; Kotecha; Schulze	The Location	3:05
6.	"I'm Sorry"	Minogue; Kotecha; Schulze; Bjösell; Falk; S. Thott; D. Thott	The Location	3:25
7.	"Gone"	Minogue; Ronald; Monteverde; Ward	LMC	3:57
8.	"So Under Pressure"	Minogue; Ronald; Monteverde; Ward	LMC	3:53
9.	"Good Times" (The Fourty4s' 7" Mix)	Minogue; Wahl; Nakas; Olsson; Grankvist; Stappe	The Fourty4s	4:09
10.	"Sunrise"	Gingell; Stone; Minogue; Davis	Jewels & Stone; Davis	3:31
11.	"He's the Greatest Dancer"	Rodgers; Edwards	LMC	3:05
12.	"I Can't Sleep at Night"	Gingell; Stone; Minogue; Davis	Jewels & Stone; Davis	3:28
13.	"I Will Come to You"	Woodford; Minogue; Davis	Davis	3:54
14.	"I've Been Waiting for You"	Masterson; Ronald; Minogue	Thriller Jill	4:36
15.	"Round the World"	Minogue; Masterson; Ronald	Thriller Jill	3:33
16.	"Xanadu"	Jeff Lynne	Thriller Jill	5:44
17.	"You Won't Forget About Me" (Afterlife Lounge Mix Edit)	Minogue; Elliot-Smith; Hammond; Mazzacani; Jeannin; Robinson	Flower Power	3:36
18.	"I Can't Sleep at Night" (Afterlife Lounge Mix)	Gingell; Stone; Minogue; Davis	Jewels & Stone; Davis	5:44

=== Australian bonus remix disc ===
1. "Touch Me Like That" with Jason Nevins (Stonebridge Club Mix)
2. "He's the Greatest Dancer" (Shapeshifters Remix)
3. "Perfection" with Soul Seekerz (Seamus Haji & Paul Emmanuel Remix)
4. "So Under Pressure" (Soul Seekerz Extended)
5. "You Won't Forget About Me" with Flower Power (Discode Club Mix)
6. "I Can't Sleep at Night" (Kenny Hayes Sunshine Funk Mix)
7. "Touch Me Like That" with Jason Nevins (Space Cowboy Remix)
8. "He's the Greatest Dancer" (Riffs & Rays Remix)
9. "Perfection" with Soul Seekerz (Koishii & Hush Remix)
10. "So Under Pressure" (Steve Pitron Remix)

Australian iTunes bonus track

11. "Do You Believe Me Now?" with Roger Sanchez

== Personnel ==
- Central Station Records – artwork
- Cody Burridge – photography
- Andrew Hobbs – additional photography
- Lee Monteverde – producer (tracks 7, 8, 11)
- Rob Davis – producer (tracks 10, 12, 13)
- Thriller Jill – producer (tracks 14, 15, 16)

== Charts ==
Chart performance for Club Disco
Chart (2007)	Peak position
UK Album Downloads (Official Charts)	17

== Release history ==
Release history and formats for Club Disco
Country	Release format	Label	Release date
United Kingdom	Digital download	All Around the World	5 November 2007
Australia	Physical edition	Central Station	27 May 2008
