= Moto Blanco =

- Also known as: Bobby Blanco & Miki Moto, Menta
- Origin: South London, England
- Genres: House, deep house, funky house
- Occupation(s): DJs, producers
- Years active: 1989–present
- Members: Danny Harrison; James Hurr (2013–present)
- Past members: Arthur Smith (1989–2013)
- Website: myspace.com/motoblanco

Moto Blanco are an English electronic music duo originally consisting of Danny Harrison (a.k.a. Bobby Blanco) and Arthur Smith (a.k.a. Miki Moto). Since 2013, the duo has consisted of Danny Harrison and sound engineer James Hurr. They are also regularly joined by record producer Jon Cohen and guitarist Shane Hill.

== History ==
Harrison and Smith were both born in South London and began dabbling with music production whilst in school. They have been releasing music under various aliases since 1989 before switching to Moto Blanco in 2003 when they moved to mainstream production. Harrison also gained success as one half of speed garage duo 187 Lockdown in the 1990s.

== Discography ==
=== Releases ===
- Satisfied (2003)
- 3 AM (2004)
- Black Sugar (2005)

=== Selected remixes ===
- Adele - "Set Fire to the Rain" (2011)
- Agnes - "Release Me" (2009)
- Akon - "Dangerous" (2008)
- Alexandra Burke featuring Flo Rida - "Bad Boys" (2009)
- Amanda Morra - "Rebel for Life" (2011)
- Amy Grant - "Every Heartbeat" (2014)
- Anastacia - "Absolutely Positively" (2009)
- Annie Lennox - "Sing" (2007)
- Bananarama - "Move in My Direction" (2005)
- Babs Savage - "LaLa" (2016)
- Bird - "Girl Can't Decide" (2016)
- Booty Luv - "Shine" (2007)
- Brandy - "Right Here" (2008)
- Brit & Alex - "Let It Go" (2008)
- Buzz Junkies featuring Elesha - "Don't Mess with My Man" (2007)
- Buzz Junkies featuring Elesha - "If You Love Me" (2007)
- Cee Lo Green - "Cry Baby" (2011)
- Cheryl Cole - "Fight For This Love" (2009)
- Christian Falk featuring Robyn - "Dream On" (2008)
- Ciara - "Get Up" (2006)
- D.O.N.S featuring Technotronic - "Pump Up The Jam" (2005)
- Dalal - "Taste the Night" (2011)
- Daniel Merriweather - "Red" (2009)
- Dannii Minogue and Soul Seekerz - "Perfection" (2005)
- Eighteen featuring Stephanie Mills - "(You're Putting a) Rush on Me" (2007)
- Enrique Iglesias - "Can You Hear Me" (2008)
- Enrique Iglesias featuring Sean Garrett - "Away" (2009)
- Enrique Iglesias featuring Ciara - "Takin' Back My Love" (2009)
- Erasure - "Be With You" (2011)
- Erika Jayne - "Stars" (2008)
- Erika Jayne - "Roller Coaster" (2010)
- Esmée Denters - "Outta Here" (2009)
- First Ladies Of Disco - "Show Some Love" (2019)
- Flipsyde - "When It Was Good" (2009)
- Fugative - "Crush" (2010)
- Gabriella Cilmi - "Hearts Don't Lie" (2010)
- Geneva - "Karma" (2011)
- Genevieve Mariko Wilson - "Vertigo" (2013)
- George Michael featuring Mutya Buena - "This Is Not Real Love" (2006)
- J Latif - "Anonymous" (2011)
- JLS - "Proud" (2012)
- Janet Jackson - "Make Me" (2009)
- Janet Jackson - "Feedback" (2007)
- Jennifer Hudson - "Spotlight" (2008)
- Jennifer Hudson - "Everybody Needs Love" (2011)
- Jennifer Lopez - "Do It Well" (2007)
- Jennifer Lopez - "Hold It Don't Drop It" (2007)
- Jennifer Lopez - "Louboutins" (2010)
- Jessica Jarrell - "Almost Love" (2010)
- Jessie Malakouti - "Standing Up for the Lonely" (2010)
- Joe Jonas - "Just in Love" (2011)
- Kamaliya - "I'm Alive" (2013)
- Kat Graham - "Put Your Graffiti on Me" (2012)
- Kendra Erica - "Self Control" (2018)
- Keri Hilson featuring Ne-Yo & Kanye West - "Knock You Down" (2009)
- Kristine W - "Out There" (2016)
- Kylie Minogue - "I Was Gonna Cancel" (2014)
- Lady Gaga - "Paparazzi" (2009)
- Lara Fabian - "Je Suis À Toi" (2019)
- Leona Lewis - "Bleeding Love" (2007)
- Leona Lewis - "Forgive Me" (2008)
- Lionel Richie - "I Call It Love" (2006)
- Lisa Stansfield - "Can't Dance" (2013)
- Mariah Carey - "I Want To Know What Love Is" (2009)
- Mark Morrison - "Innocent Man" (2008)
- Mark Morrison featuring Tanya Stephens - "Dance 4 Me" (2008)
- Marlon Roudette - "New Age" (2012)
- Mary J. Blige - "Be Without You" (2005)
- Mary J. Blige - "Just Fine" (2008)
- Mary J. Blige - "I Am" (2010)
- Matt Zarley - "WTF" (2011)
- Matt Zarley - "Trust Me" (2012)
- Matt Zarley - "Somebody 4 Everybody" (2014)
- Maverick Sabre - "I Need" (2011)
- Michelle Williams - "We Break the Dawn" (2008)
- Miley Cyrus - "See You Again" (2008)
- Mika - "Love Today" (2007)
- Mutya Buena - "Real Girl" (2007)
- Natalia Kills - "Mirrors" (2010)
- Natalia Kills featuring will.i.am - "Free" (2011)
- Natasha Bedingfield - "Angel" (2007)
- Nicole Scherzinger - "Run" (2014)
- Nikkole - "Zero" (2014)
- Novena - "When I'm With You" (2009)
- Paloma Faith - "Picking Up the Pieces" (2012)
- Parade - "Perfume" (2011)
- Peppermint Heaven - "Plenty of Time" (2014)
- Pussycat Dolls featuring Snoop Dogg - "Bottle Pop" (2009)
- Pussycat Dolls - "I Hate This Part" (2008)
- Pixie Lott - "Boys And Girls" (2009)
- Priyanka Chopra featuring Pitbull - "Exotic" (2013)
- Rebecca Ferguson - "I Hope" (2012)
- Rihanna - "Push Up on Me" (2008)
- Rihanna - "SOS" (2006)
- Rixton - "We All Want The Same Thing" (2015)
- Rizzle Kicks - "Dreamers" (2012)
- Robin Thicke featuring Kendrick Lamar - "Give It 2 U" (2013)
- Robin Thicke featuring Mary J. Blige - "Magic Touch" (2008)
- Robin Thicke - "Sex Therapy" (2010)
- September - "Resuscitate Me" (2010)
- Sérgio Mendes - "Magalenha" (2010)
- Shakira - "She Wolf" (2009)
- Shayne Ward - "Gotta Be Somebody" (2010)
- Shayne Ward - "If That's OK with You" (2007)
- Solange - "I Decided" (2008)
- Sofia Carson -"Love Is the Name" (2016)
- Sophie Ellis-Bextor - "Catch You" (2007)
- Steve Appleton (musician) - "City Won't Sleep" (2009)
- Stooshe - "Waterfalls" (2012)
- Taio Cruz featuring Pitbull - "There She Goes" (2012)
- T2 - "Butterflies" (2008)
- Timbaland featuring SoShy and Nelly Furtado - "Morning After Dark" (2009)
- Timbaland featuring Ne-Yo - "Hands in the Air" (2012)
- The Saturdays - "If This Is Love" (2008)
- The Wanted - "Gold Forever" (2011)
- Tony Moran featuring Jason Walker - "So Happy" (2016)
- Wideboys featuring Clare Evers - "Bomb the Secret" (2007)
- Will Young - "Jealousy" (2011)
- will.i.am feat. Britney Spears - "Scream and Shout" (2013)
- Wretch 32 featuring Example - "Unorthodox" (2011)
- Xpress 2 featuring David Byrne - "Lazy" (2008)
- Zoe Badwi - "Freefallin'" (2010)
