= Touch Me Like That =

Single by Dannii Minogue vs. Jason Nevins

from the album Club Disco
- Released: 3 December 2007
- Recorded: 2007
- Genre: Hi-NRG; electro-disco
- Length: 3:29
- Label: All Around the World; Central Station
- Songwriters: Jason Nevins; Lisa Molina; Sylvester James; James Wirrick
- Producer: Jason Nevins

Dannii Minogue singles chronology
"He's the Greatest Dancer" (2007)	"Touch Me Like That" (2007)	"Summer of Love" (2015)

"Touch Me Like That" is a dance-pop song performed by Dannii Minogue and Jason Nevins. The song was written by Jason Nevins, Lisa Molina, Sylvester James and James Wirrick. It samples the melody of the disco song "You Make Me Feel (Mighty Real)", originally performed by Sylvester. The song is the sixth and final single from Minogue's fifth album Club Disco (2007).

It was released as a single on 3 December 2007 in the United Kingdom to mixed reviews from music critics. The song was released in Minogue's native Australia on 19 January 2008, but was not eligible to chart in Australia because its CD single contained too many remixes by other artists. It entered the top fifty in the UK and became Minogue's thirteenth Upfront Club Chart number one. The song's music video, directed by Andy Soup, was filmed in London, England, and features Minogue in a multi-coloured studio surrounded by a starry background and four dancers.

== Background and reception ==
"Touch Me Like That" was written by record producer Jason Nevins and singer/songwriter Lisa Molina. It samples the melody of the disco song "You Make Me Feel (Mighty Real)" originally performed and co-written by Sylvester James and James Wirrick. Minogue was offered to provide vocals for the song by Nevins' agent Matt Waterhouse, who was a close friend of Minogue's. Minogue recorded her vocals in London, England, after Nevins had sent her an instrumental version of the song to her e-mail inbox. Nevins produced and programmed the song from his home in New York City.

Minogue has cited "You Make Me Feel (Mighty Real)" as one of her favourite disco songs and compared recording "Touch Me Like That" to the "best chocolate cake you ever ate". Nevins had previously remixed Minogue's song "Put the Needle on It" in 2002, but the two had not previously met. He enjoyed working with Minogue and described working with her as "great". "Touch Me Like That" premiered on The Chris Moyles Show in United Kingdom on 3 October 2007.

In a review for Digital Spy, Nick Levine described the song as a "sticky, sweaty club banger" that will guarantee that "Team Minogue’s winning streak continues". Channel 4 wrote that the song was a "quaintly dated electro disco workout" and rated it five out of ten stars. Alex Needham of The Guardian was not impressed with the track, describing it as "dodgy hi-NRG so low rent it makes Rhydian look like Lou Reed - and not in a good way, either".

== Chart performance ==
"Touch Me Like That" was officially released in the United Kingdom and Ireland as a digital download on 3 December 2007. The song debuted on the UK Singles Chart on 11 December 2007 at number forty-eight. In Ireland, the track reached number two on the Irish Dance Chart. In Scotland the song debuted and peaked at 18 and stayed in the chart for 6 weeks.

In Australia, "Touch Me Like That" was released on 19 January 2008. The CD single, which featured thirteen tracks, was not eligible to chart because it contained too many remixes by other artists.

== Music video ==
The music video featured Minogue dancing on a suspended dance floor accompanied by four dancers.

The music video for "Touch Me Like That" was directed by Andy Soup and filmed in London, England. It features Minogue in a multi-coloured studio surrounded by a starry background and four dancers. The video begins with Jason Nevins spinning the song on his turntable, with a starry background behind him. Minogue, wearing a short white dress and a curly hairdo, is then shown in a room of mirrors and on a suspended dance floor. The final sequence of the video features Minogue in a red dress, surrounded by a spinning cage in a digital room. As the video concludes, all of the scenes are intercut and gradually fade.

Minogue was responsible for finding the song's video director and for its concept. Nevins had only two days to film the video because he was busy working on music for the Grammy Awards. The video shoot marked the first time Minogue and Nevins had met in person, as previous communication had been through record label representatives and e-mail.

== Formats and track listings ==
These are the formats and track listings of major single releases of "Touch Me Like That".

UK CD single

1. "Touch Me Like That" (Radio edit) – 3:31
2. "Touch Me Like That" (Jason Nevins Extended mix) – 6:28
3. "Touch Me Like That" (Jack Rokka mix) – 6:32
4. "Touch Me Like That" (Soul Seekerz Club mix) – 6:36
5. "Touch Me Like That" (StoneBridge Club mix) – 7:58
6. "Touch Me Like That" (LMC mix) – 5:22
7. "Touch Me Like That" (Music video)

UK 12" vinyl picture disc

1. "Touch Me Like That" (Jason Nevins Extended mix) – 6:28
2. "Touch Me Like That" (Space Cowboy mix) – 5:32
3. "Touch Me Like That" (Soul Seekerz Dirty dub) – 7:06
4. "Touch Me Like That" (Jack Rokka dub) – 6:37

Australian CD single

1. "Touch Me Like That" (Radio edit) – 3:31
2. "Touch Me Like That" (Space Cowboy Radio edit)^{*} – 3:31
3. "Touch Me Like That" (Stonebridge Club mix) – 7:58
4. "Touch Me Like That" (Jason Nevins [Extended] mix) – 6:28
5. "Touch Me Like That" (Soul Seekerz Club mix) – 6:36
6. "Touch Me Like That" (Soul Seekerz [Feel Me] Dirty dub) – 7:06
7. "Touch Me Like That" (Jack Rokka remix) – 6:32
8. "Touch Me Like That" (Jack Rokka dub) – 6:37
9. "Touch Me Like That" (LMC mix) – 5:22
10. "Touch Me Like That" (Fugitives Touched Up mix) – 6:24
11. "Touch Me Like That" (Jason Nevins Extended mix) – 6:28 ^{#}
12. "Touch Me Like That" (Space Cowboy dub) – 4:28
13. "Touch Me Like That" (Stonebridge dub) – 6:24

* Mispressing causing track 2 to be a double up of the 'Radio edit', instead of the 'Space Cowboy mix'. As a result, the 'Space Cowboy mix' is not present on the disc.
# Mispressing causing track 11 to be a double up of the 'Jason Nevins Extended mix'.

== Personnel ==
The following people contributed to "Touch Me Like That":

- Dannii Minogue – lead vocals, backing vocals
- Jason Nevins – songwriter, production, drum programming, synths
- Terry Ronald – backing vocals, mixing, vocal production
- Ian Masterson – engineering, mixing, vocal production
- Valerie Etienne and Michaela Breen – backing vocals
- Andrew Hobbs – photography

== Charts ==
Chart (2007)	Peak position
Irish Dance (IRMA)	2
Romania (Romanian Top 100)	66
Scotland Singles (OCC)	18
UK Singles (OCC)	48
UK Dance (OCC)	7
