= You Won't Forget About Me =

2004 single by Dannii Minogue and Flower Power

Single by Dannii Minogue vs. Flower Power

from the album Club Disco and The Hits and Beyond
- B-side: "Flower Power"
- Released: 25 October 2004
- Genre: Dance-pop
- Length: 3:42
- Label: Level Two, Oxyd, Time, Magix (Australia); All Around the World (UK)
- Songwriters: Pete Hammond; Andrea Jeannin; Steph Mazzacani; Hannah Robinson; Dannii Minogue; Bruce Elliott-Smith
- Producer: Flower Power

Dannii Minogue singles chronology
"Don't Wanna Lose This Feeling" (2003)	"You Won't Forget About Me" (2004)	"Perfection" (2005)

Audio sample
- file; help

"You Won't Forget About Me" is a song recorded by Australian singer Dannii Minogue, released on 25 October 2004 from her greatest hits album, The Hits & Beyond (2006). It has since been officially added to the track listing of her fifth studio album, Club Disco (2007).

== Composition and inspiration ==
"You Won't Forget About Me" is a dance-pop song, which features the use of heavy drum beats and synth strings. The song's lyrics, written by Minogue, Pete Hammond and Bruce Elliott-Smith, describe a summer romance that has now ended. The two lovers reassure each other that "you won't forget about me / as long as you live".

After the success of her previous album, Neon Nights, Minogue was asked by All Around the World Records, a major dance label whose main signings were Cascada, Ultrabeat, N-Trance and Flip & Fill, if she would write the lyrics to a popular dance instrumental track called "Flower Power", which was a huge hit in clubs in Ibiza. Minogue agreed and wrote the lyrics to the song that became "You Won't Forget About Me". About writing lyrics for the song Minogue said, "I'd heard it without vocals and I thought, 'Fantastic'. I had already written loads of vocals for myself and knew I had something that would be perfect for it."

== Music video ==
The music video for the song was directed by Harvey & Carolyn. It is more edgy than previous Minogue videos and was inspired by the television show Sex and the City. The music video is filled with rewind and fast-forward sequences. Dannii's date is played by her friend, the male model Benjamin Hart.

The video begins with Dannii returning home from a date. She then takes off her dress, slips into an oversized T-shirt, and then has a girls' night out with her girlfriends at her house, drinking, dancing, and playing around. Dannii's date calls her and she begins to get ready for her next date. She takes off her shirt and lies on her bed, daydreaming about her and her date being intimate. Dannii's girlfriends then help her get dressed, in the same blue dress, and they start dancing and playing around a final time before Dannii notices the doorbell. She puts her barrette back in her hair, answers the door, and starts making out with her date, just like in the beginning of the video.

== Chart performance ==
"You Won't Forget About Me" was a top 10 hit in the United Kingdom, peaking at number seven and remained in the charts for five weeks, selling 30,000 copies. Elsewhere in Europe, the song was also a hit, reaching number 12 in Italy, number 13 in Greece, number 14 in Spain, and number 16 in Portugal. In Minogue's native Australia, the song debuted and peaked at number 20 on 5 December 2004, spending a total of three non-consecutive weeks in the top 50.

== Track listings ==
Australian CD single

1. "You Won't Forget About Me" (vocal radio edit) – 3:46
2. "You Won't Forget About Me" (LMC extended vocal mix) – 6:56
3. "You Won't Forget About Me" (original extended vocal mix) – 6:33
4. "Flower Power" (club mix) – 6:39
5. "You Won't Forget About Me" (Afterlife Lounge remix) – 5:31

UK CD1

1. "You Won't Forget About Me" (radio edit)
2. "You Won't Forget About Me" (LMC remix)
3. "You Won't Forget About Me" (Afterlife remix)
4. "You Won't Forget About Me" (Basscore remix)
5. "Flower Power" (instrumental)
6. "You Won't Forget About Me" (Kenny Hayes remix)
7. "You Won't Forget About Me" (video CD-ROM)

UK CD2

1. "You Won't Forget About Me" (radio edit)
2. "Flower Power" (instrumental)

UK 12-inch single

A1. "You Won't Forget About Me" (LMC remix)
A2. "You Won't Forget About Me" (Afterlife remix)
B1. "Flower Power" (instrumental)
B2. "You Won't Forget About Me" (Mike Di Scala remix)

US 12-inch single

A1. "You Won't Forget About Me" (original extended vocal mix) – 6:33
A2. "You Won't Forget About Me" (LMC extended vocal mix) – 6:56
B1. "Flower Power" (club mix) – 6:39
B2. "Flower Power" (dub mix) – 6:35

== Personnel ==
- Dannii Minogue – lead vocals
- Hannah Robinson – backing vocals
- Ross Cullum – vocal production
- Stefano Mazzacani – mixing, production
- Andrea Jeannin – mixing, production
- Sean McMenomy – photography

== Charts ==
Weekly chart performance for "You Won't Forget About Me"
Chart (2004)	Peak position
Australia (ARIA)	20
Belgium (Ultratop 50 Flanders)	42
Belgium (Ultratop 50 Wallonia)	37
France (SNEP)	55
Greece (IFPI)	13
Ireland (IRMA)	22
Ireland Dance (IRMA)	3
Italy (FIMI)	12
Romania (Romanian Top 100)	53
Russia Airplay (TopHit)	71
Scottish Singles Sales (Official Charts)	2
Spain (Promusicae)	14
UK Singles (Official Charts)	7
UK Dance (Official Charts)	6

== Release history ==
Release history and formats for "You Won't Forget About Me"
Region	Date	Format(s)	Label(s)	Ref.
United Kingdom	25 October 2004	12-inch vinyl; CD	All Around the World	
Australia	22 November 2004	CD	Level Two; Oxyd; Time; Magix	
