= Zarley =

Zarley is a surname. Notable people with the surname include:

- Kermit Zarley (born 1941), American golfer
- Matt Zarley (fl. 1981), American singer-songwriter, musical theatre performer, and LGBTQ+ advocate
