= He's the Greatest Dancer =

1979 single by Sister Sledge

Single by Sister Sledge

from the album We Are Family
- B-side: "Somebody Loves Me"
- Released: January 1979
- Recorded: 1978
- Studio: Power Station, New York City, New York, US
- Genre: Disco; R&B; funk; soul
- Length: 6:16 (album version); 3:31 (single version)
- Label: Cotillion
- Songwriters: Bernard Edwards; Nile Rodgers
- Producers: Bernard Edwards; Nile Rodgers

Sister Sledge singles chronology
"I've Seen Better Days" (1978)	"He's the Greatest Dancer" (1979)	"We Are Family" (1979)

Alternative release(s)
- Italian 7-inch single

Official music video
- "He's the Greatest Dancer" on YouTube

"He's the Greatest Dancer" is a disco song by the American vocal group Sister Sledge. Released on February 3, 1979, the song was written and composed by Bernard Edwards and Nile Rodgers, and recorded for the group's successful 1979 album We Are Family. Billboard named the song No. 66 on its list of "100 Greatest Girl Group Songs of All Time."

== Background ==
The song was released as the lead single from the album at the beginning of 1979, crossing over from the clubs – its 12″ version was shared by the "We Are Family" and "Lost in Music" tracks – to R&B radio, giving Sister Sledge a number one hit on both Billboard's Dance and R&B charts in March 1979. The song reached number nine on the Billboard Hot 100 in May. It might have risen higher except that, in the same month, Atlantic Records, prompted by the overwhelming club response to "We Are Family," sent the last-named track to radio. The song was also a hit in Australia (No. 5), the Netherlands (No. 1) and the UK (No. 6).

"He's the Greatest Dancer" was sampled by Will Smith in his 1997 number one hit single "Gettin' Jiggy wit It," the first selection he released from his album Big Willie Style. In 2000, DJ Tony Touch recorded a version of the song, entitled "I Wonder Why? (He's the Greatest DJ)," whose lyrics were sung by Keisha Spivey and Pam Long of R&B girl group Total.

In 2007, the song was recorded and released by Dannii Minogue and was an international Top 40 hit. It was sampled by a Russian pop group Hi-Fi in their 1999 song "Pro Leto" (Про лето, translated as "About Summer"). Robert Hood released a techno track based on the hook of this song on his label M-Plant. Nick Holder sampled the song on his 1997 album One Night in the Disco.

== Lyrics and music ==
The lyrics were written by Bernard Edwards and Nile Rodgers:

Arrogance, but not conceit
As a man, he's complete
....
He wears the finest clothes, the best designers, heaven knows
oooo from his head down to his toes... Halston, Gucci, Fiorucci...

Nile Rodgers has speculated that this may have been the first occurrence of the later-widespread phenomenon of brands being mentioned in songs. The recording features Rodgers on guitar, Edwards on bass, Tony Thompson on percussion, Andrew Barrett on piano, Raymond Jones on backing keyboards, and orchestration by Gene Orloff's Chic Strings.

== Production ==
Chic members Bernard Edwards and Nile Rodgers, who produced the We Are Family album for Sister Sledge, originally formulated all its songs with the group in mind, envisioning the title selection as the lead single. When Atlantic Records wanted a more overtly disco song Edwards and Rodgers gave Sister Sledge "He's The Greatest Dancer," which they had originally intended for Chic.

Nile Rodgers recalled the Sister Sledge members being "furious" at being asked to sing the lyric "My crème de la crème please take me home" – "to them that [line] made them seem like loose women" – and that they suggested a lyric adjustment to "My crème de la crème, please don't go home." Rodgers says he and Edwards refused to change the lyric "because we knew the world that we were writing about obviously more than [Sister Sledge] did because they had never even been in a disco...He ain't going to go home because [he is] the greatest dancer...he's gonna stay there longer than you."

Rodgers later described his and Edwards's approach with Sister Sledge as one of "sing this," and admitted to "misrepresenting" them because Rodgers and Edwards had not even met Sister Sledge before the sessions. Kathy Sledge performed lead vocals on the single.

== Reception ==
Record World called "He's the Greatest Dancer" "a driving disco tune" with "a timely story" that is "well delivered vocally and instrumentally." Cash Box said it has "a fine rhythm track with firm beat and circling rhythm guitar work" with sweetening by the strings and a "strong and engaging" vocal performance. Billboard said that "A clear upfront vocal paces this rhythmic dance track that also features tight instrumentation and more lyrical content than standard disco fare."

== Charts ==
=== Weekly charts ===
Weekly chart performance for "He's the Greatest Dancer"
Chart (1979)	Peak position
Australia (Kent Music Report)	22
Belgium (Ultratop 50 Flanders)	20
Canada Top Singles (RPM)	6
Canada Dance/Urban (RPM)	1
Ireland (IRMA)	20
Netherlands (Dutch Top 40)	16
Netherlands (Single Top 100)	18
New Zealand (Recorded Music NZ)	17
UK Singles (Official Charts)	6
US Billboard Hot 100	9
US Dance Club Songs (Billboard) with "We Are Family"	1
US Hot R&B/Hip-Hop Songs (Billboard)	1
US Cash Box Top 100 Singles	8
US Top 100 Black Contemporary Singles (Cash Box)	1

=== Year-end charts ===
Year-end chart performance for "He's the Greatest Dancer"
Chart (1979)	Position
Canada Top Singles (RPM)	72
US Billboard Hot 100	45
US Dance Club Songs (Billboard) with "We Are Family"	6
US Hot R&B/Hip-Hop Songs (Billboard)	45
US Cash Box Top 100 Singles	70
US Top 100 Black Contemporary Singles (Cash Box)	21

== Certifications ==
Region	Certification	Certified units/sales
New Zealand (RMNZ)	Gold	15,000^{‡}
United Kingdom (BPI)	Gold	400,000^{‡}
^{‡} Sales+streaming figures based on certification alone.

== Dannii Minogue version ==
"He's the Greatest Dancer"

Single by Dannii Minogue

from the album Club Disco
- Released: December 2006 (UK); April 14, 2007 (Australia)
- Recorded: 2006
- Genre: Electropop
- Length: 3:05
- Label: All Around the World; Central Station
- Songwriters: Bernard Edwards; Nile Rodgers
- Producer: Lee Monteverde

Dannii Minogue singles chronology
"I Can't Sleep at Night" (2007)	"He's the Greatest Dancer" (2006)	"Touch Me Like That" (2007)

"He's the Greatest Dancer" is a cover version of the Sister Sledge song performed by Australian singer Dannii Minogue. In November 2006, Minogue performed the song on BBC One's Children in Need telethon. Later that month a studio version of the song, remixed by Fugitive, appeared on the dance compilation Clubland 10. Though the selection was recorded as the charity single for that year's Children in Need, it was dropped when Minogue pulled out of Strictly Come Dancing to work on rival TV show The X Factor. The single was replaced in favour of a cover of "Downtown" former Spice Girl Emma Bunton had performed. In December 2006, the track was released to dance clubs in the United Kingdom. It was commercially released in Australia by Central Station Records on April 14, 2007.

=== Chart performance ===
"He's the Greatest Dancer" reached number one on the UK Upfront Club Chart in December 2006 and became Minogue's eleventh club number one in the country. The track also reached number one on the Commercial Pop Chart. In Australia, "He's The Greatest Dancer" entered the singles chart on April 29, 2007 at number thirty-seven, and remained on the chart for two weeks. The track was more successful in Spain, where it reached number nine fourteen weeks after its debut.

=== Formats and track listings ===
These are the formats and track listings of major single releases of "He's the Greatest Dancer".

Australian CD single
(CSRCD50532; Released April 14, 2007)

1. "He's the Greatest Dancer" (LMC edit) – 3:05
2. "He's the Greatest Dancer" (LMC extended) – 5:55
3. "He's the Greatest Dancer" (Chris Lake remix) – 6:29
4. "He's the Greatest Dancer" (Shapeshifters remix) – 5:41
5. "He's the Greatest Dancer" (Kenny Hayes Dub Addiction remix) – 5:49
6. "He's the Greatest Dancer" (Riffs & Rays mix) – 8:19
7. "He's the Greatest Dancer" (Sebastien Leger Electro Vocal mix) – 8:51
8. "He's the Greatest Dancer" (Fugitive Club mix) – 5:20

Official remixes

1. "He's the Greatest Dancer" (Sebastien Leger Electro Dub mix)

=== Charts ===
Chart (2007)	Peak position
Australian Singles Chart	37
Spanish Singles Chart	9
UK Upfront Club Chart	1
