= Coconut (Harry Nilsson song) =

1971 novelty song by Harry Nilsson

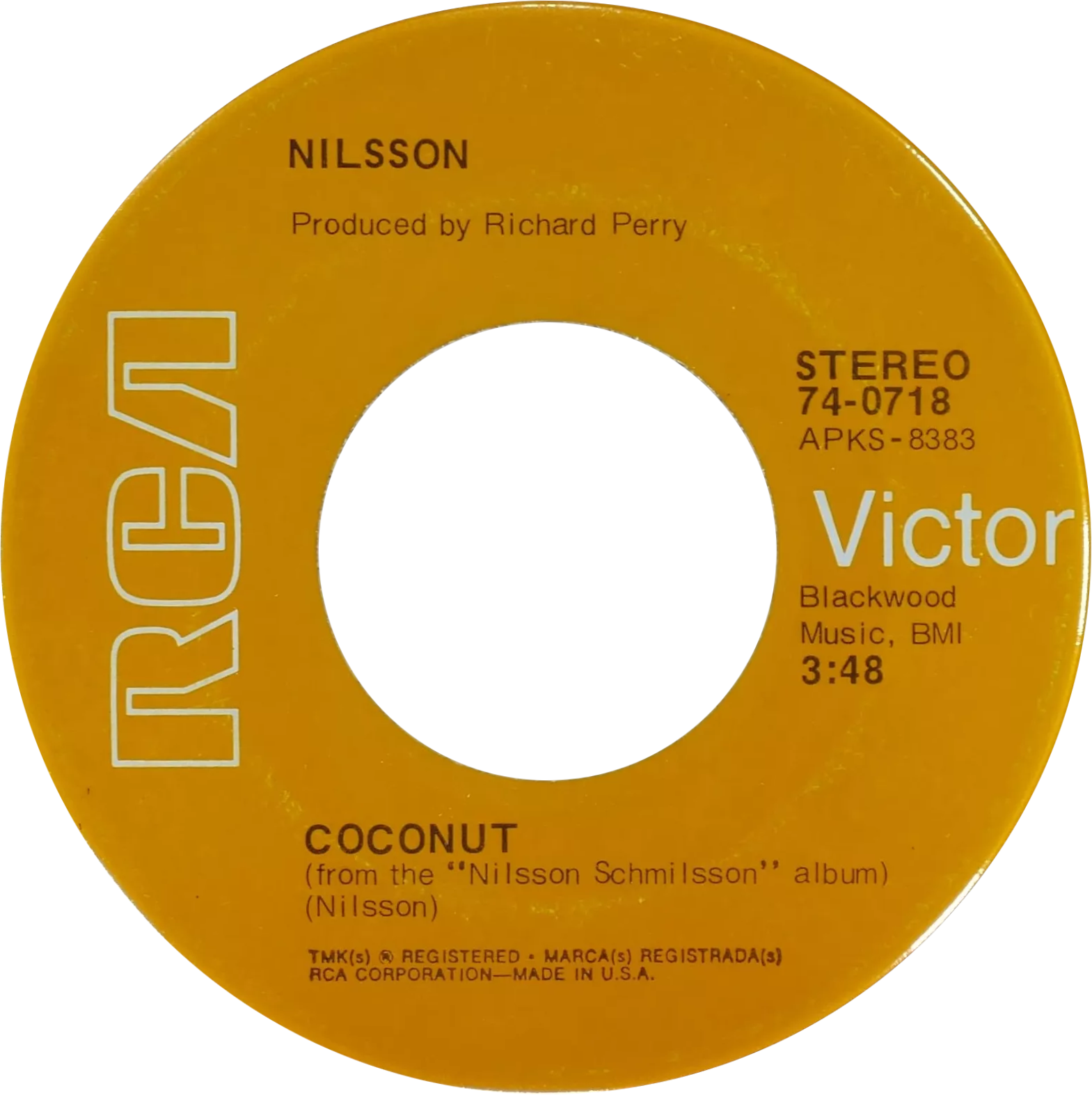
- Side A of the US single

Single by Nilsson

from the album Nilsson Schmilsson
- B-side: "The Moonbeam Song"
- Released: June 1972
- Recorded: 1971
- Genre: Novelty; calypso; exotica
- Length: 3:52
- Label: RCA Victor
- Songwriter: Harry Nilsson
- Producer: Richard Perry

Nilsson singles chronology
"Jump into the Fire" (1972)	"Coconut" (1972)	"You're Breakin' My Heart" (1972)

Official audio
- "Coconut" by Harry Nilsson on YouTube

"Coconut" is a novelty song written and first recorded by American singer-songwriter Harry Nilsson, released as the third single from his 1971 album, Nilsson Schmilsson. It was on the U.S. Billboard charts for 14 weeks, reaching #8, and was ranked by Billboard as the #66 song for 1972. It charted in a minor way in the UK, reaching #42. "Coconut" did best in Canada, where it peaked at #5.

== Lyrics ==
The lyrics feature Nilsson singing two characters (a narrator and a woman), each in a different voice. The woman drinks a mixture of lime juice and coconut milk, becomes sick, and calls the doctor. The doctor, annoyed at being woken up, tells her to drink the same thing again and call in the morning.

== Music ==
An arpeggiated C^{7} chord accompanies the song throughout.

== Personnel ==
According to the 1971 LP credits:

- Harry Nilsson – vocals
- Caleb Quaye – guitar
- Ian Duck – acoustic guitar
- Herbie Flowers – bass
- Jim Gordon – drums, percussion
- Roger Pope – drums

== Chart history ==
=== Weekly charts ===
Chart (1972)	Peak position
Canada RPM Top Singles	5
UK Singles (Official Charts)	42
US Billboard Hot 100	8
US Cash Box Top 100	12

=== Year-end charts ===
Chart (1972)	Rank
Canada (RPM)	52
US Billboard Hot 100	66
US Cash Box	87

== Dannii Minogue version ==
"Coconut"

Single by Dannii Minogue

from the album Girl
- B-side: "Everybody Changes Underwater"; "Heaven Can Wait"; "Someone New"
- Released: 16 November 1998
- Recorded: 1994–1995
- Genre: Dance-pop; techno-pop
- Length: 4:50
- Label: WEA
- Songwriter: Harry Nilsson
- Producers: Flexifinger (Original vocal production: DNA)

Dannii Minogue singles chronology
"Disremembrance" (1998)	"Coconut" (1998)	"Everlasting Night" (1999)

Music video
- "Coconut" by Dannii Minogue on YouTube

Audio
- "Coconut" (from The 1995 Sessions) by Dannii Minogue on YouTube

Dannii Minogue recorded the song in 1994 with UK dance producers DNA. When Minogue parted ways with Mushroom Records in 1995 and signed to Eternal Records in 1996, she had the track remixed by producers Flexifinger.

The track was originally used as a hidden bonus track on her third album Girl. It was subsequently released in Australia on 16 November 1998 as the fourth and final single from that album, peaking at number 62 on the ARIA singles chart upon its debut, on the chart dated week commencing 23 November 1998.

In 2009, the original version of "Coconut" was made available on the compilation The 1995 Sessions.

=== Charts ===
Chart performance for "Coconut" by Dannii Minogue
Chart (1998)	Peak position
Australia (ARIA)	62

== In popular culture ==
In 1979, the song was performed by Kermit the Frog on Season 4 episode 10 of The Muppet Show starring Kenny Rogers. In this version, Kermit was repeatedly injured earlier in the episode and wants relief from a "flipper-ache" rather than a stomachache.

The song is used during the end credits of Quentin Tarantino's 1992 crime film Reservoir Dogs.

The famous "Midnight Margaritas" moment from the cult-classic, 1998 fantasy film, Practical Magic features the song, as well as being featured in the sequel film Practical Magic 2 in 2026.

The Baha Men version of the song was used in the ChalkZone episode, The Smooch.

The song is performed in the episode "Let Them Eat Cake" of TV series House.

The song is featured twice in the diner scenes in 2010 action-adventure game Alan Wake.
