= Trouser Enthusiasts =

Northern Ireland electronic dance music group

- Origin: Belfast, Northern Ireland
- Genres: House, Trance
- Years active: 1990–present
- Members: Ian Masterson
- Past members: David Green

Trouser Enthusiasts are an electronic dance music production group, formed by Belfast-born Ian Masterson and David Green. The group is best known as producers of pop and dance remixes, having worked for, most prominently, Pet Shop Boys, Dannii Minogue, and Saint Etienne. They have produced only one original single, "Sweet Release".

== History ==
Green and Masterson first met in 1990 while still at school and, through a mutual obsession with Pet Shop Boys, decided to form a musical partnership of their own. Over the next few years they worked together on a number of demos under the moniker "Inedible" - Masterson's upbeat disco stylings providing the perfect contrast to Green's dark, brittle lyrics. This period culminated in an EP of six songs entitled "Superstardom" (including a cover of disco classic "Feels Like I'm In Love" and the very first remix by Trouser Enthusiasts). Green provided the vocals for these songs.

Both moved to London in 1995 intent on securing a record deal on the strength of this demo. Through a friend they secured a management deal and began working on dance tracks under the name "Flexifinger". Green, who was a big fan of The X-Files at that time, suggested creating a dance version of its theme. The pair created the track in Masterson's front room over a period of weeks and submitted the demo to their manager. Their manager was not impressed by the idea as there were several dance versions of the theme circulating at this time (unknown to either of them). The story goes that the following week their manager received a call from someone at Warner Bros. Records asking for an X-Files remix. The DAT was sent to Warner Bros. Records, accepted, and the following month was released on the official The X-Files single. Dannii Minogue had just been signed to Warner Bros. Records' subsidiary "Eternal", and it was because of this remix that they were given the chance to work with her on songs for her forthcoming album.

== Discography ==
- "Killing Me" (Orange Records, 1998) - Jox & Trouser Enthusiasts
- "Sweet Release" (Delirious, 1999)

=== Remixes ===
Many Trouser Enthusiasts remixes have unique, non sequitur remix titles. These titles are included within this list.

- A*Teens – "Mamma Mia" (Trouser Enthusiasts' Undying Dub)
- Alabama 3 – "Ain't Going to Goa" (Trouser Enthusiasts Peroxide Evangelist Mix, Trouser Enthusiasts One Armed Stigmatic Dub, Trouser Enthusiasts Transcendental 7" Edit)
- Alexia – "The Music I Like" (Trouser Enthusiasts Dead Glamorous Mix, Trouser Enthusiasts Painkiller Dub)
- Amen – "Save Me" (Trouser Enthusiasts Mix)
- Anggun – "Snow on the Sahara" (Trouser Enthusiasts Kangaroo Juice Remix)
- Armin – "Blue Fear" (Trouser Enthusiasts E.B.E. Mix)
- Blue Pearl – "Naked in the Rain '98" (Trouser Enthusiasts Wet Dream Mix, Trouser Enthusiasts Tlalocan Dub)
- Boyzone – "All That I Need" (Trouser Enthusiasts Darkest Day Dub (Sex Mix), Trouser Enthusiasts Darkest Day Dub (No Sex Mix))
- Bright Light Bright Light Waiting For The Feeling (Trouser Enthusiasts Mix)
- Byron Stingily – "Testify" (Trouser Enthusiasts Passive Resistance Mix)
- Byron Stingily – "That's the Way Love Is" (Trouser Enthusiasts Mix)
- Cue – "Burning" (Trouser Enthusiasts Deep Heat Mix)
- Claire Richards - "Summer Night City" (with Andy Bell) [Trouser Enthusiasts Remix]
- Dannii Minogue – "All I Wanna Do" (Trouser Enthusiasts Toys of Desperation Mix, Trouser Enthusiasts Ultra Sensitive Dub, Trouser Enthusiasts 2020 Mixes)
- Dannii Minogue – "Heaven Can Wait" (Trouser Enthusiasts Cloud Nine Mix, Trouser Enthusiasts Hell Fire Club Dub)
- Dannii Minogue – "Everything I Wanted" (Trouser Enthusiasts Golden Delicious Mix, Trouser Enthusiasts Liquid Silk Dub)
- Dannii Minogue – "Disremembrance" (Trouser Enthusiasts Brittlestar Requiem Mix, Trouser Enthusiasts Diesel Plus Plus Dub)
- Dannii Minogue – "Everlasting Night" (Trouser Enthusiasts Burnt Angel Mix)
- Dannii Minogue – "We Could Be The One" (Trouser Enthusiasts Remix, Trouser Enthusiasts Dub)
- Dive featuring Sarah Washington – "Joy Is Free" (Trouser Enthusiasts Broken Circle Mix, Trouser Enthusiasts Blue Sister Dub)
- The Divine Comedy – "I've Been to a Marvellous Party" (Trouser Enthusiasts Formaldehyde Spritzer Mix)
- Donna Summer – "I Will Go with You (Con Te Partiro)" (Trouser Enthusiasts Twisted Kiss Mix, Trouser Enthusiasts Sudden Death Dub)
- Fierce – "Sweet Love" (Trouser Enthusiasts Mix)
- Geri Halliwell – "Bag It Up" (Trouser Enthusiasts Mix)
- Gina G – "Ti Amo" (Trouser Enthusiasts Schoolboy Crush Mix)
- Gloria Estefan – "Heaven's What I Feel" (Trouser Enthusiasts Neanderthal Thrust Mix)
- Howard Jones – "What Is Love?" (Trouser Enthusiasts Mix)
- Human Nature – "Be There with You" (Trouser Enthusiasts Electric Ecstasy Mix, Trouser Enthusiasts Martian Squid Dub)
- Jon Secada - "Stop" (Trouser Enthusiasts Mix)
- Jox & Trouser Enthusiasts – "Killing Me" (Trouser Enthusiasts vs. Jox Club Mix)
- Joy Division – "Love Will Tear Us Apart" (unreleased)
- Karen Ramirez – "Looking for Love" (Trouser Enthusiasts Joy of Sex Mix, Trouser Enthusiasts White Knuckle Dub)
- Kavana – "Funky Love" (Trouser Enthusiasts Pentagram Deathtrap Mix, Trouser Enthusiasts Freakboy Dub)
- Kylie Minogue – "Did It Again" (Trouser Enthusiasts Goddess of Contortion Mix, Trouser Enthusiasts Dark Honeymoon Dub)
- Le Click – "Heaven's Got to Be Better" (Trouser Enthusiasts Bohemian Nightlife Mix, Trouser Enthusiasts Psychic City Dub, No Joy Mix)
- Love City – "I Found Loving" (Trouser Enthusiasts Celebrity Skin Mix)
- Loveclub – "The Journey" (Trouser Enthusiasts Mix)
- Mansun – "Wide Open Space" (Trouser Enthusiasts Hermaphrodite Circus Mix)
- Mother's Pride – "Learning to Fly"
- Ofra Haza – "Show Me" (Trouser Enthusiasts Kaleidoscope Perversion Mix)
- Peach – "Sorrow Town" (Trouser Enthusiasts Teenage Abattoir Mix, Trouser Enthusiasts Discomedusa Mix)
- Peter André – "All About Us" (Trouser Enthusiasts Sole Survivor Mix)
- Pet Shop Boys – "Discoteca" (Trouser Enthusiasts Adventures Beyond the Stellar Empire Mix)
- Pet Shop Boys – "A Red Letter Day" (Trouser Autoerotic Decapitation Mix, Trouser Enthusiasts Congo Dongo Dubstramental)
- Pet Shop Boys – "Somewhere" (Trouser Enthusiasts Mix)
- Planet Perfecto – "Bullet in the Gun" (Mekka vs. Trouser Enthusiasts Mix)
- Precious - "It's Gonna Be My Way" (Trouser Enthusiasts Vocal)
- Prima featuring Tracey-Anne Lynch – "Into the Sun" (Trouser Enthusiasts Resurrection Remix)
- The Quest Project – "Angel" (Trouser Enthusiasts Heavenly Host Mix)
- Rochelle – "Mouth" (Skynet vs. Trouser Enthusiasts Mix)
- Saint Etienne – "Sylvie" (Trouser Enthusiasts Tintinnabulation Mix)
- Saint Etienne – "Lose That Girl (Trouser Enthusiasts Brides In The Bath Mix)"
- Saint Mark – "New Year's Day" (Trouser Enthusiasts Mix, Trouser Enthusoasts Dubstramental)
- Sarah Brightman – "Who Wants to Live Forever" (Trouser Enthusiasts Cybernetic Odalique Mix)
- Sheena Easton – "Giving up, Giving In" single- (Fabulous) produced by Ian Masterson and Terry Ronald
- Silhouette – "Can't Wait to Find Love" (Trouser Enthusiasts Mix)
- Sunscreem – "Cover Me" (Trouser Enthusiasts Reptillian Cathedral Mix, Trouser Enthusiasts Subhuman Megamix)
- Supreme Beings Of Leisure - "Strange Love Addiction" (Trouser Enthusiasts Mix)
- Technique – "Sun Is Shining" (Mekka vs. Trouser Enthusiasts Mix)
- Tenth Planet – "Ghosts" (Trouser Enthusiasts Mix)
- Tomski – "14 Hours to Save the Earth" (Trouser Enthusiasts Sci-Fi Mix)
- Trilby – "Home" (Trouser Enthusiasts Flaming Heart Mix)
- Trouser Enthusiasts – "Sweet Release" (Trouser Enthusiasts Full On Mix, Trouser Enthusiasts Second Coming)
- United Citizen Federation featuring Sarah Brightman – "Starship Troopers" (Trouser Enthusiasts Iris Unguicularis Mix)
- Wes – "Alane" (Trouser Enthusiasts Orgasmic Apparition Mix, Trouser Enthusiasts Spectrophiliac Dub)
- Ysa Ferrer – "Tu Sais, I Know" (Trouser Enthusiasts Muscle Beach Mix)

Ian also remixed the following (with David Green) under the guise Flexifinger

- Army Of Lovers - "Give My Life (Flexifinger's Five Gates Of Hell Mix)
- Dannii Minogue - "Disremembrance" (Flexifingers Mix)
- Mark Snow - "The X Files" (Flexifinegrs Terrestrial Mix)
- OMC - "How Bizarre" (In My Face Mix)
- Supernova - "Some Might Say" (Secret Orgasm Mix)
