= Good Girl Gone Bad: The Remixes =

Remix album by Rihanna
- Released: January 27, 2009
- Recorded: 2006–2008
- Genre: Dance
- Length: 44:48
- Labels: SRP; Def Jam
- Producer: Various: The Carter Administration (exec.); Carl Sturken (co-exec.); Evan Rogers (co-exec.); Christopher "Tricky" Stewart; Seamus Haji; Paul Emanuel; Brian Kennedy; Jody den Broeder; Wideboys; Stargate; Ne-Yo; Tony Moran; Soul Seekerz; Warren Rigg; K-Klass; Shea Taylor; J. R. Rotem; Moto Blanco; Neo Da Matrix; Lindbergh Palace

Rihanna chronology
Good Girl Gone Bad: Reloaded (2008)	Good Girl Gone Bad: The Remixes (2009)	Rated R (2009)

Good Girl Gone Bad: The Remixes is the first remix album by Barbadian singer Rihanna. It was released on January 27, 2009, through Def Jam Recordings and SRP Records. The album contains club remixes of tracks from her third studio album Good Girl Gone Bad (2007) and its 2008 re-release, Good Girl Gone Bad: Reloaded. The songs were remixed by producers and disc jockeys such as Moto Blanco, Tony Moran, Soul Seekerz and Wideboys. The remixes appear in the form of radio edits instead of full-length versions.

The compilation received generally mixed reviews from music critics; the album was recommended for fans who were awaiting the release of Rihanna's next studio album. Good Girl Gone Bad: The Remixes peaked at number 106 on the Billboard 200 and number four on the Dance/Electronic Albums chart. It was ranked as the 22nd best-selling album of 2009 on the latter chart, and it has sold 49,000 copies in the US as of 2010.

== Background ==
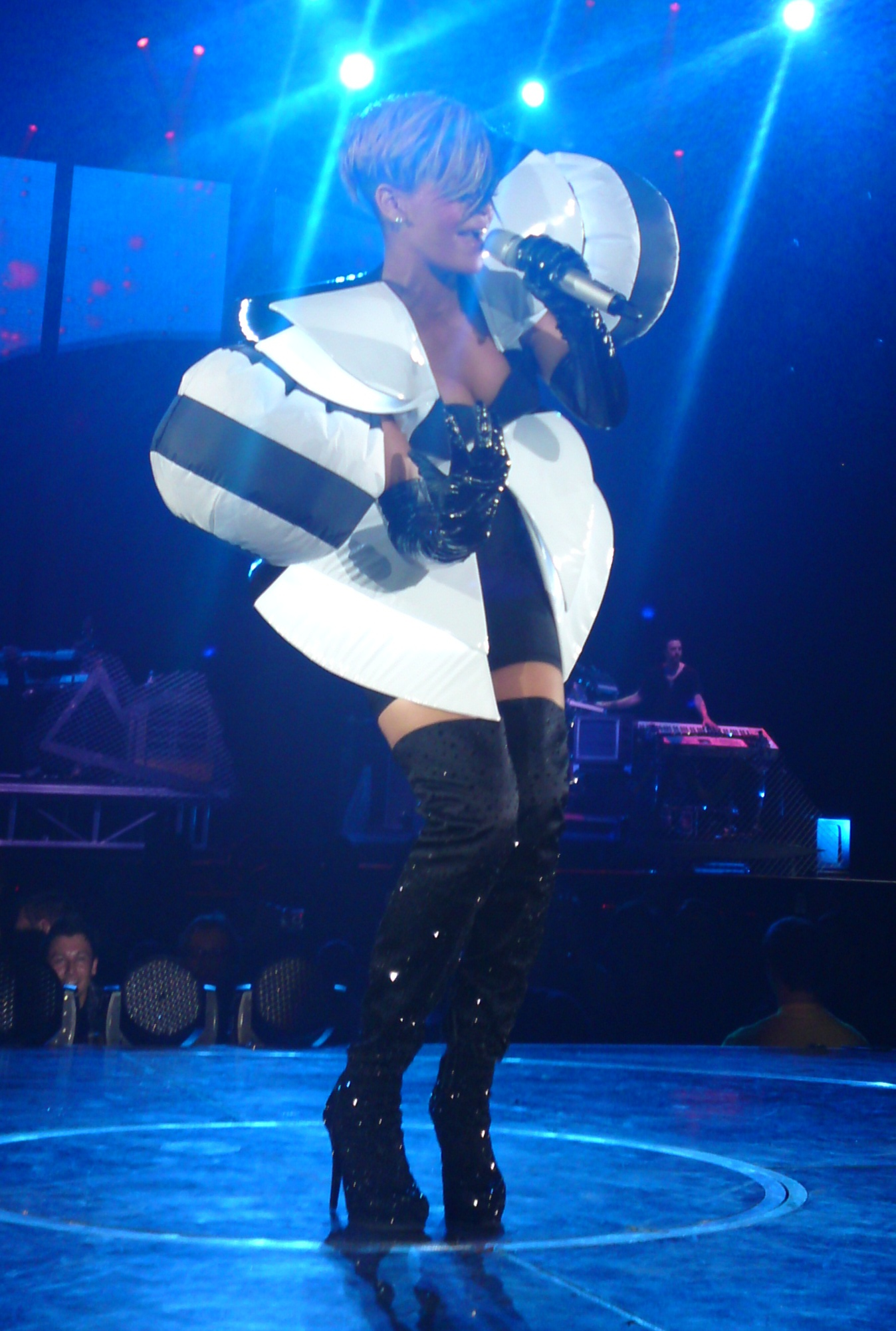
Rihanna performing "Umbrella", which appears in the form of two remixes on the album

American publication Rap-Up announced on December 21, 2008 that Rihanna would release her first remix album, titled Good Girl Gone Bad: The Remixes, in late-January 2009. The cover art, designed by Ciarra Pardo, and the official release date were revealed two days later. Def Jam Recordings released the album in the United States on January 27, 2009, in CD, digital, and vinyl formats. The set was later released in the United Kingdom on February 9, 2009. The compilation is made up of electronic dance remixes of tracks from Rihanna's third studio album Good Girl Gone Bad and two songs from its 2008 re-release, Good Girl Gone Bad: Reloaded. All standard edition tracks from the original album were remixed for the compilation, excluding "Lemme Get That", "Rehab" and "Sell Me Candy".

The remixes were done by producers and disc jockeys Moto Blanco, Jody den Broeder, Paul Emanuel, Seamus Haji, K-Klass, Lindbergh Palace, Tony Moran, Warren Rigg, Soul Seekerz and Wideboys. Soul Seekerz and Wideboys contributed the most remixes, with three tracks each—"Breakin' Dishes", the original album's title song and "Say It" were provided by Soul Seekerz, while Wideboys remixed "Shut Up and Drive", "Question Existing", and "Don't Stop the Music". On the back cover, however, the Wideboys remix of "Don't Stop the Music" is mistakenly credited to Jody den Broeder. A Broeder remix of the track was released, but was not included on the album. The track listing is a reworked version of the bonus disc from the European deluxe edition of Good Girl Gone Bad. However, Good Girl Gone Bad: The Remixes excludes the remixes of the A Girl like Me single "SOS" and the Good Girl Gone Bad bonus tracks "Cry" and "Haunted", in favor of remixes of the new Reloaded tracks "Disturbia" and "Take a Bow". Additionally, a Lindbergh Palace remix of "Umbrella" was added. While the original album's bonus disc includes the full-length remixes, Good Girl Gone Bad: The Remixes includes only radio edits, which cut the original versions by three to four minutes.

== Critical reception ==
Critical reception of Good Girl Gone Bad: The Remixes was generally mixed. Jamie Nicholes of Noize Magazine was positive and observed that "there's actually quite a bit ... to appreciate here". The writer noted that the radio edits were possibly used to "make it more digestible to the masses who don't understand full length mixes". In an editorial review for Rhapsody, Rachel Devitt briefly commented that Rihanna gets "even more mileage out of her phenomenal, hit-generating third album" with the remix compilation. Between the Lines critic Chris Azzopardi was mixed in his review, writing: "Milking her 2007 album, Good Girl Gone Bad, for the third time, the 12-track disc is (insert frown here) all radio edits." The reviewer regarded the content as "mostly tightly produced", naming the two remixes of "Umbrella" and the sped-up "Push Up on Me" as examples. AllMusic's Andy Kellman was also mixed regarding the compilation, calling it "both a cash-in and a wasted opportunity." Kellman liked that the label opted for the radio edits instead of the full-length versions, remarking: "The edits ... were possibly favored to further emphasize the disc's alternate standing to the original set ... it plays out more like a proper album than a standard, disjointed remix compilation." Kellman recommended the album for fans who had "worn out the original album", commenting that "the disc will certainly help pass the time before Rihanna's fourth album".

== Commercial performance ==
In the United States, Good Girl Gone Bad: The Remixes debuted and peaked at number 106 on the Billboard 200, with first-week sales of just under 5,000 copies. It also debuted at number four on the Dance/Electronic Albums chart. Ultimately, the album remained on Dance/Electronic Albums chart for a total of 18 weeks and was ranked at number 22 on the 2009 year-end chart. It also peaked at number 59 on the Top R&B/Hip-Hop Albums chart. By July 2010, Good Girl Gone Bad: The Remixes had sold 49,000 copies in the US, according to Nielsen SoundScan.

== Track listing ==
Good Girl Gone Bad: The Remixes track listing
No.	Title	Writer(s)	Producer(s)	Length
1.	"Umbrella" (featuring Jay-Z; Seamus Haji & Paul Emanuel)	Shawn Carter; Kuk Harrell; Terius Nash; Christopher "Tricky" Stewart	Tricky Stewart; Seamus Haji^{[b]}; Paul Emanuel^{[b]}	3:58
2.	"Disturbia" (Jody den Broeder)	Robert Allen; Andre Merritt; Chris Brown; Brian Kennedy	Brian Kennedy; Jody den Broeder^{[b]}	3:52
3.	"Shut Up and Drive" (Wideboys)	Carl Sturken; Evan Rogers; Bernard Sumner; Peter Hook; Stephen Morris; Gillian Gilbert	Sturken; Rogers; Wideboys^{[b]}	3:39
4.	"Don't Stop the Music" (Wideboys^{[c]})	Mikkel S. Eriksen; Tor Erik Hermansen; Tawanna Dabney; Michael Jackson	Stargate; Wideboys^{[b]}	3:10
5.	"Take a Bow" (Tony Moran & Warren Rigg)	Hermansen; Eriksen; Shaffer Smith	Stargate; Ne-Yo; Tony Moran^{[b]}; Warren Rigg^{[b]}	4:02
6.	"Breakin' Dishes" (Soul Seekerz)	Stewart; Terius Nash	Stewart; Soul Seekerz^{[b]}	3:19
7.	"Hate That I Love You" (featuring Ne-Yo; K-Klassic)	Smith; Eriksen; Hermansen	Stargate; K-Klass^{[b]}	3:58
8.	"Question Existing" (Wideboys)	Smith; Shea Taylor; Carter	Shea Taylor; Ne-Yo^{[a]}; Wideboys^{[b]}	3:40
9.	"Push Up on Me" (Moto Blanco)	J. R. Rotem; Makeba Riddick; Lionel Richie; Cynthia Weil	J. R. Rotem; Moto Blanco^{[b]}	3:28
10.	"Good Girl Gone Bad" (Soul Seekerz)	Smith; Hermansen; Eriksen; Lene Marlin	Stargate; Soul Seekerz^{[b]}	3:29
11.	"Say It" (Soul Seekerz)	Riddick; Quaadir Atkinson; Ewart Brown; Clifton Dillon; Sly Dunbar; Brian Thompson	Neo Da Matrix; Soul Seekerz^{[b]}	4:21
12.	"Umbrella" (featuring Jay-Z; Lindbergh Palace)	Carter; Harrell; Nash; Stewart	Stewart; Lindbergh Palace^{[b]}	3:53
Total length:				44:48

=== Notes ===
- ^{^[a]} signifies a co-producer
- ^{^[b]} signifies a remixer and additional producer
- ^{^[c]} mistakenly credited to Jody den Broeder

== Credits and personnel ==
Credits are adapted from the Good Girl Gone Bad: The Remixes booklet.

- Robert Allen – songwriting
- Joey Arbagey – remix A&R
- Quaadir Atkinson – songwriting
- Chris Brown – background vocals, songwriting
- Ewart Brown – songwriting
- Jay Brown – A&R
- The Carter Administration – executive production
- Shawn Carter – songwriting
- Jon Cohen – keyboards
- Eddie Craig – additional production, remixing
- Kevin "KD" Davis – mixing
- Jody den Broeder – additional production, remixing
- Roberto Deste – photography
- Clifton Dillon – songwriting
- Sly Dunbar – songwriting
- Paul Emanuel – additional production, drums, keyboards, remixing
- Mikkel Storleer Eriksen – recording, songwriting
- Gillian Gilbert – songwriting
- Seamus Haji – drums, keyboards, additional production, remixing
- Kuk Harrell – recording, songwriting, vocal production
- Danny Harrison – additional production, remixing
- Al Hemberger – mixing, recording
- Tor Erik Hermansen – songwriting
- Andy Hickey – keyboards
- Peter Hook – songwriting
- Michael Jackson – songwriting
- Julian Jonah – guitar
- Terese Joseph – A&R administration
- Doug Joswick – package production
- K-Klass – additional production, remixing
- Brian Kennedy – production
- Simon Langford – additional production, keyboards, remixing
- Daniel Laporte – recording
- Fabienne Leys – A&R coordination
- Lindbergh Palace – remixing
- Deborah Mannis-Gardner – sample clearance agent
- Manny Marroquin – mixing
- Andre Merritt – songwriting, background vocals
- Tony Moran – engineering, remixing
- Russ Morgan – additional production, remixing
- Stephen Morris – songwriting
- Moto Blanco – additional production, remixing
- Julian Napolitano – additional production, keyboards, remixing
- Ne-Yo – production, vocal production
- Neo Da Matrix – production
- Greg Ogan – recording
- Ciarra Pardo – art direction, design
- Lionel Richie – songwriting
- Makeba Riddick – songwriting, vocal production
- Warren Rigg – engineering, remixing
- Paul Roberts – production, remixing
- J. Peter Robinson – art direction, design
- Evan Rogers – executive production, production, songwriting
- J. R. Rotem – production, songwriting
- Brian Seals – songwriting
- George Seara – recording
- Arthur Smith – additional production, remixing
- Shaffer Smith – songwriting
- Tyran "Ty Ty" Smith – A&R
- Soul Seekerz – remixing
- Stargate – production
- Christopher Stewart – songwriting, production
- Carl Sturken – executive production, production, songwriting
- Jim Sullivan – additional production, remixing
- Bernard Sumner – songwriting
- Phil Tan – mixing
- Shea Taylor – production, songwriting
- Brian Thompson – songwriting
- Mike Tocci – recording, supervising engineering
- Marcos Tovar – supervising engineering
- Andrew Vastola – recording
- Cynthia Weil – songwriting
- Wideboys – additional production, remixing
- Andrew Wiliams – additional production, engineering, remixing
- Leon Zervos – mastering

== Charts ==
=== Weekly charts ===
Weekly chart performance for Good Girl Gone Bad: The Remixes
Chart (2009)	Peak position
Polish Albums (ZPAV)	32
US Billboard 200	106
US Top Dance Albums (Billboard)	4
US Top R&B/Hip-Hop Albums (Billboard)	59

=== Year-end charts ===
Year-end chart performance for Good Girl Gone Bad: The Remixes
Chart (2009)	Position
US Dance/Electronic Albums (Billboard)	22
