= I Can't Sleep at Night =

Single by Dannii Minogue

from the album Club Disco and The Hits & Beyond
- Released: 8 January 2007
- Recorded: 2005
- Length: 3:25
- Label: All Around the World
- Songwriters: Dannii Minogue; Rob Davis; Jewels & Stone
- Producers: Jewels & Stone

Dannii Minogue singles chronology
"So Under Pressure" (2006)	"I Can't Sleep at Night" (2007)	"He's the Greatest Dancer" (2007)

Music video
- "I Can't Sleep at Night" on YouTube

"I Can't Sleep at Night" is a song by Dannii Minogue. It was written by Minogue, Rob Davis and Jewels & Stone for Minogue's fifth studio album Club Disco and included on her greatest hits compilation, The Hits & Beyond (2006). On 8 January 2007, the song and its remixes were released as a digital download in Australia, the United Kingdom and North America. The radio edit of the song features minor mixing and production differences and is the version featured in the music video.

== Music video ==
A music video was produced for the song. Directed by Ulf Buddensieck, the video features Minogue in a house waiting for someone. It begins with Minogue staring longingly outside of her home, but as the video progresses she becomes tired of waiting and falls asleep as her mobile phone begins to ring. The music video was released commercially on The Hits & Beyond special edition companion DVD, released in June 2006.

== Track listing ==
Digital download
(Released 8 January 2007)

1. "I Can't Sleep at Night" (Radio edit) – 3:31
2. "I Can't Sleep at Night" (KB Project remix) – 6:12
3. "I Can't Sleep at Night" (Kenny Hayes Sunshine Funk dub) – 6:04
4. "I Can't Sleep at Night" (Instrumental) – 3:29
5. "I Can't Sleep at Night" (Kenny Hayes Sunshine Funk mix) – 6:06
6. "I Can't Sleep at Night" (Afterlife remix) – 5:43
7. "I Can't Sleep at Night" (Friday Night Posse remix) – 6:30

== Charts ==
Chart (2007)	Peak position
Turkey Top 20 Chart	12
