= Girl (Dannii Minogue album) =

Studio album by Dannii Minogue
- Released: 8 September 1997
- Recorded: 1997
- Genre: Dance; trance; techno; electronica; pop
- Length: 53:29
- Label: Eternal; Warner; Rhino
- Producer: Brian Higgins; Matt Gray; Stuart McLennan; Tim Powell; Graham Stack; Mark Taylor; Ian Masterson; David Green

Dannii Minogue chronology
Get into You (1993)	Girl (1997)	The Singles / The Remixes (1998)

Singles from Girl
- 1. "All I Wanna Do" Released: 11 August 1997; 2. "Everything I Wanted" Released: 20 October 1997; 3. "Disremembrance" Released: 16 March 1998; 4. "Coconut" Released: 16 November 1998

Girl is the third studio album by Australian singer Dannii Minogue. It was released by Eternal Records on 8 September 1997 in the United Kingdom. Four singles were released to promote the album including the UK Dance Chart number ones "All I Wanna Do", "Everything I Wanted", "Disremembrance" and the Australian-only single, "Coconut". In November 2007, the album was reissued featuring slightly different artwork and a bonus disc of remixes by Rhino Entertainment. In 2022, to celebrate its twenty-fifth anniversary, Minogue announced an LP release on coloured, recycled vinyl through Warner Music Australia.

== Background ==
In 1995, Minogue had initially begun work on the follow-up album to Get into You. However, during recording sessions, Mushroom Records terminated their contract with Minogue. Following a divorce from Julian McMahon and a cover-shoot for Australian Playboy magazine, Minogue was approached by Warner Bros. Records to record a new album.

== Recording ==
Sessions began in early 1997 with Ian Masterson and Brian Higgins.

== Title and artwork ==
The album's name is a direct reference to the refrain "I may not be the innocent girl" in the album's lead single, "All I Wanna Do". The album artwork was shot by Steve Shaw and designed by Gerard Saint. In 2007, the re-issue featured slightly different artwork with Minogue's head tilted to face the camera and additional booklet design featuring lyrics and images from the album's respective music video shoots, also shot by Steve Shaw.

== Composition ==
Girl was distinctively more dance-orientated than Minogue's previous work and stands as a dance, trance, techno and electronica album. The album opens with the lead single "All I Wanna Do", which contained a more emphasised hi-NRG sound in contrast to the pop style. This would be felt on the rest of the album. The other tracks on Girl ranged from mature pop songs ("Heaven Can Wait", "Am I Dreaming?", "Everything I Wanted", "It's Amazing") to more techno-oriented tracks ("Disremembrance", "Movin' Up" and bonus tracks "Someone New", "Keep Up with the Good Times"). The album also included notable styles of dance music ("So in Love with Yourself", "If It Moves – Dub It", "Coconut") as well as ambient-infused sounds ("Everybody Changes Underwater").

== Promotion ==
To promote the album, Minogue appeared on a variety of television shows for interviews and performances, in the United Kingdom and Australia, including Top of the Pops and TFI Friday. In 1998, Minogue also embarked on the Unleashed '98 tour consisting of 23 dates around the United Kingdom. Minogue was also part of the line-up for the Mushroom 25 Live concert held in Melbourne in 1998.

=== Singles ===
"All I Wanna Do" was released as the lead single from the album on 11 August 1997. It peaked at number 4 on the UK Singles Chart and number 1 on the UK Dance Club Chart, in Australia, it peaked at number 11 on the ARIA Singles Chart and was certified gold. It also become a surprise chart-topper in Cyprus.

"Everything I Wanted" was released as the second single on 20 October 1997. It peaked at number 15 on the UK Singles Chart and become her second single number 1 on the UK Dance Club Chart, while in Australia it peaked at number 44 on the ARIA Singles Chart.

"Disremembrance" was released on 16 March 1998 as the third single, was remixed by Flexifinger for release. It peaked at number 21 on the UK Singles Chart and become her third single number 1 on the UK Dance Club Chart. In Australia, it peaked at number 53 on the ARIA Singles Chart.

"Coconut" was released on 16 November 1998 as the fourth single in Australia only. It peaked at number 62 on the ARIA Singles Chart. The single featured the B-side "Someone New".

Other songs
Several remixes were commissioned of "Heaven Can Wait", some of which were on included on promotional releases of "Everything I Wanted" and released on the "Coconut" single. Previously unreleased mixes of "Movin' Up'" were released on the deluxe edition of the album in 2007 as well as a radio edit version of "Someone New".

=== Tour ===
Unleashed '98 - UK Tour
- Tour by Dannii Minogue
- Associated album: Girl
- Start date: September 11, 1998
- End date: October 10, 1998
- Legs: 1
- No. of shows: 20 in England; 1 in Wales; 1 in Scotland; 1 in Northern Ireland; 23 in total

In support of Girl, Minogue embarked on the Unleashed '98 tour, consisting of 23 dates across the United Kingdom.

==== Setlist ====
1. "This Is It" (Hi-NRG version)
2. "Love and Kisses"
3. "Show You the Way to Go"
4. "So In Love with Yourself"
5. "Coconut" (tribal version)
6. "It's Amazing"
7. "Everything I Wanted"
8. "Heaven Can Wait" (acoustic version)
9. "Baby Love"
10. Disco Medley - "Heart of Glass" / "You Make Me Feel (Mighty Real)" / "The Rhythm Of The Night"
11. "Don't Wanna Leave You Now" (unreleased 1995 track)
12. "Jump to the Beat"
13. "Disremembrance"
14. "All I Wanna Do"

==== Tour dates ====
Date	City	Country	Venue
September 11, 1998	Margate	England	Winter Gardens
September 13, 1998	Hastings	England	White Rock Theatre
September 14, 1998	Yeovil	England	Octagon Theatre
September 15, 1998	Truro	England	Hall for Cornwall
September 16, 1998	Reading	England	The Hexagon
September 17, 1998	Tunbridge Wells	England	Assembly Hall
September 19, 1998	Rhyl	Wales	Pavilion Theatre
September 20, 1998	Huddersfield	England	Town Hall
September 21, 1998	Derby	England	Assembly Rooms
September 25, 1998	Canterbury	England	Marlowe Theatre
September 26, 1998	London	England	Lewisham Theatre
September 27, 1998	York	England	Barbican Centre
September 28, 1998	Bradford	England	St. Georges Hall
September 29, 1998	Hemel Hempstead	England	Dacorum Pavilion
October 1, 1998	Lowestoft	England	Marina Theatre
October 2, 1998	Skegness	England	Embassy Centre
October 3, 1998	King's Lynn	England	Corn Exchange
October 4, 1998	Stevenage	England	Arts & Leisure Centre
October 6, 1998	Belfast	Northern Ireland	Waterfront Hall
October 7, 1998	Ayr	Scotland	Gaiety Theatre
October 8, 1998	Warrington	England	Parr Hall
October 9, 1998	Bridlington	England	Spa Theatre
October 10, 1998	Basingstoke	England	The Anvil

== Critical reception ==
Professional ratings
Review scores
Source	Rating
AllMusic	4/5 stars
Music Week	3/5 stars
NME	6/10
Uncut	3/5 stars

Despite commercial disappointment, Girl received a generally positive reception from music critics. John Lucas from AllMusic complimented the album, writing: "The music is no longer so concerned with aping American trends; it was clearly influenced by the British dance club sounds of the mid-'90s. In short, Dannii was finally carving an identity for herself." The AllMusic site gave the album four out of five stars. Writing for Billboard magazine, Larry Flick complimented her vocal development as indicative of "an album that's free of cloying pretensions and unapologetic in its pure-pop approach to dance music".

== Commercial performance ==
Girl charted at number 57 in the United Kingdom on the UK Albums Chart and number 69 in Australia on the ARIA Albums Chart. It sold 15,000 copies in the United Kingdom.

== Track listing ==
Girl track listing
No.	Title	Writer(s)	Producer(s)	Length
1.	"All I Wanna Do"	Brian Higgins; Stuart McLennan; Tim Powell; Matt Gray	Higgins; McLennan; Powell; Gray	4:29
2.	"Heaven Can Wait"	Higgins; McLennan; Powell; Gray	Higgins; McLennan; Powell; Gray	3:41
3.	"So in Love with Yourself"	Paul Barry; Mark Taylor; Steve Torch	Metro	5:06
4.	"Am I Dreaming?"	Graham Stack; Barry; Taylor; Torch	Metro	4:10
5.	"Everybody Changes Underwater"	Dannii Minogue; David Green; Ian Masterson	Flexifinger	6:36
6.	"Everything I Wanted"	Minogue; Taylor; Torch	Metro	4:39
7.	"If It Moves – Dub It"	Minogue; Higgins; McLennan; Powell; Gray	Higgins; McLennan; Powell; Gray	6:31
8.	"Disremembrance"	Green; Masterson	Flexifinger	4:05
9.	"It's Amazing"	Higgins; McLennan; Powell; Gray	Higgins; McLennan; Powell; Gray	5:05
10.	"Movin' Up"	Lars Erlandsson; Fredrik Lenander; Bella Morel; David Kreuger; Per Magnusson	Higgins; McLennan; Powell; Gray	4:15
11.	"Coconut" (hidden track)	Harry Nilsson	DNA; Neil Davidge; Masterson	4:51
Total length:				53:29

Japanese edition bonus tracks
No.	Title	Writer(s)	Producer(s)	Length
11.	"Someone New"	Green; Masterson	Flexifinger	9:23
12.	"Coconut" (hidden track)	Nilsson	DNA; Neil Davidge; Masterson	4:51
Total length:				62:52

Deluxe edition (Disc one)
No.	Title	Writer(s)	Producer(s)	Length
10.	"Movin' Up" (original extended mix)	Erlandsson; Lenander; Morel; Kreuger; Magnusson	Higgins; McLennan; Powell; Gray	5:52
11.	"Keep Up with the Good Times"	Higgins; McLennan; Powell; Gray	Higgins; McLennan; Powell; Gray	4:19
12.	"Someone New" (Flexifinger radio edit)	Green; Masterson	Flexifinger	3:46
13.	"Coconut"	Nilsson	DNA; Neil Davidge; Masterson	4:48
14.	"All I Wanna Do" (Trouser Enthusiasts radio edit)	Higgins; McLennan; Powell; Gray	Higgins; McLennan; Powell; Gray	4:12
15.	"Everything I Wanted" (Xenomania radio edit)	Minogue; Taylor; Torch	Metro	4:47
16.	"Disremembrance" (Trouser Enthusiasts Radio edit)	Green; Masterson	Flexifinger	4:29
Total length:				76:35

Deluxe edition (Disc two)
No.	Title	Writer(s)	Producer(s)	Length
1.	"All I Wanna Do" (12" extended mix)	Higgins; McLennan; Powell; Gray	Higgins; McLennan; Powell; Gray	6:52
2.	"Everything I Wanted" (Xenomania 12" Club mix)	Minogue; Taylor; Torch	Metro	7:07
3.	"Heaven Can Wait" (Trouser Enthusiasts Cloud Nine mix)	Higgins; McLennan; Powell; Gray	Higgins; McLennan; Powell; Gray	12:10
4.	"Disremembrance" (full orchestral 12" mix)	Green; Masterson	Flexifinger	9:29
5.	"All I Wanna Do" (Qattara's Club mix)	Higgins; McLennan; Powell; Gray	Higgins; McLennan; Powell; Gray	10:08
6.	"Everything I Wanted" (Jupiter 6 Soul Surround mix)	Minogue; Taylor; Torch	Torch	6:50
7.	"Disremembrance" (Twyce as Nyce 1:40AM Club mix)	Green; Masterson	Flexifinger	6:06
8.	"Movin' Up" (Getting Harder mix)	Erlandsson; Lenander; Morel; Kreuger; Magnusson	Higgins; McLennan; Powell; Gray	5:51
9.	"Keep Up with the Good Times" (Xenomania 12" mix)	Higgins; McLennan; Powell; Gray	Higgins; McLennan; Powell; Gray	6:47
10.	"All I Wanna Do" (Tiny Tim & The Mekon Dream dub)	Higgins; McLennan; Powell; Gray	Higgins; McLennan; Powell; Gray	7:45
Total length:				79:05

25th anniversary vinyl edition
No.	Title	Writer(s)	Producer(s)	Length
10.	"Movin' Up" (original extended mix)	Erlandsson; Lenander; Morel; Kreuger; Magnusson	Higgins; McLennan; Powell; Gray	5:52
11.	"Coconut"	Nilsson	DNA; Neil Davidge; Masterson	4:48
12.	"Keep Up with the Good Times"	Higgins; McLennan; Powell; Gray	Higgins; McLennan; Powell; Gray	4:19
13.	"Someone New" (Flexifinger radio edit)	Green; Masterson	Flexifinger	3:46
14.	"All I Wanna Do" (Trouser Enthusiasts radio edit)	Higgins; McLennan; Powell; Gray	Higgins; McLennan; Powell; Gray	4:12
15.	"Everything I Wanted" (Xenomania radio edit)	Minogue; Taylor; Torch	Metro	4:47
16.	"Disremembrance" (Trouser Enthusiasts Radio edit)	Green; Masterson	Flexifinger	4:29
Total length:				76:35

== Personnel ==
- Dannii Minogue – lead vocals, backing vocals
- Terry Ronald – backing vocals, vocal arrangement
- Jackie Rawe – backing vocals
- Kylie Minogue – backing vocals (track 3)
- Paul Lewis – backing vocals
- Diane Charlemagne – backing vocals
- Suzanne Rhatigan – backing vocals
- Owen Parker – guitar
- Julian Dunkley – guitar
- Drew Milligan – programming
- Sally Herbert – strings
- Margaret Roseberry – strings
- Jules Singleton – violin
- Anna Hemery – violin
- Anne Wood – violin
- Anne Stephenson – violin
- Jackie Norrie – violin
- Gini Ball – violin
- Jocelyn Pook – viola
- Claire Orsler – viola
- Ellen Blair – viola
- Dinah Beamish – cello
- Nick Cooper – cello
- Billy McGee – double bass
- Gary Williams – fretless bass
- Mark McGuire – engineer
- Stuart McLennan – assistant producer, backing vocals
- Tim Powell – assistant producer
- Graham Stack – producer
- Brian Higgins – producer
- Matt Gray – producer
- David Green – producer
- Ian Masterson – producer
- Mark Taylor – producer

== Charts ==
1997 chart performance for Girl
Chart (1997)	Peak position
Australian Albums (ARIA)	69
UK Albums (OCC)	57

2022–2023 chart performance for Girl
Chart (2022–2023)	Peak position
Australian Vinyl Albums (ARIA)	6
Scottish Albums (OCC)	21
UK Independent Albums (OCC)	10

== Release history ==
Release history and formats for Girl
Country	Date	Format(s)	Label
United Kingdom	8 September 1997	CD; cassette	Eternal
Australia	8 September 1997	CD; cassette	Warner
Germany	8 September 1997	CD; cassette	Warner
Japan	8 September 1997	CD	WEA
United Kingdom	5 November 2007	2CD	Rhino
