= Breakin' Dishes =

Song by Rihanna

from the album Good Girl Gone Bad
- Released: May 31, 2007
- Studio: Triangle Sound, Atlanta; Pacifique Recording Studio, Hollywood; Westlake Recording Studios, Hollywood
- Songwriters: C. "Tricky" Stewart; Terius Nash
- Producers: Tricky Stewart; Kuk Harrell

"Breakin' Dishes" is a song by the Barbadian singer Rihanna, from her third album Good Girl Gone Bad (2007). The song was co-written by Christopher Stewart and The-Dream, with production completed by the former. The song received positive reviews from music critics, who agreed that the song was one of the highlights of the album. "Breakin' Dishes" also charted at number four on the US Hot Dance Club Songs chart in both 2008 and 2009. The song's only live televised performance was at the Pepsi Smash Show Super Bowl game in 2009, and it was also included on three of Rihanna's arena tours; the Good Girl Gone Bad Tour (2007–08), Last Girl on Earth Tour (2009–10) and the Loud Tour (2011). In 2025, following a rise in popularity on TikTok, the song charted in multiple countries.

== Composition ==
"Breakin' Dishes" was written by Christopher "Tricky" Stewart and The-Dream, who also produced the song. The song appears as the fourth track on Good Girl Gone Bad. Lyrically, "Breakin' Dishes" is about "a downtrodden wife who exacts revenge on her cheating husband", according to Nick Levine of Digital Spy. According to the digital music sheet published by EMI Publishing, the song is written in the key of B minor and is set in common time with a moderate techno rock beat, with a metronome of 124 beats per minute. Rihanna's vocal range in the song spans from the low note of G_{3} to the high note of C♯_{5}. Musically, "Breakin' Dishes" is piano and guitar driven, incorporating elements of R&B and dance-pop.

== Critical reception ==
The song received positive reviews from critics. Levine of Digital Spy called the song "one of the album's standout tracks". Upon the release of Good Girl Gone Bad: Reloaded (2008), Levine criticized the choice of "Take a Bow" being released as the lead single to promote the re-release (one of three new songs on the re-release), opining that "Breakin Dishes" was a better choice to follow the up-tempo "Don't Stop the Music" and a "surefire smash". Neil Drumming of Entertainment Weekly described the song as an "appropriately frantic romp", with regard to the lyrics "Is he cheating?/Maybe, I don't know/I'm looking around for something else to throw", whilst Sarah McIntyre of Raidió Teilifís Éireann described the song as "ultra-sassy" and "aggressive", writing that the mood of the album changes once "Breakin' Dishes" plays, compared to the first three songs "Umbrella", "Push Up On Me" and "Don't Stop the Music". Sal Cinquemani of Slant Magazine criticized the name of the song, as well as others from Good Girl Gone Bad, writing "Good Girl might have the most consistently hilarious song titles of the year ('Breakin' Dishes,' 'Shut Up And Drive,' 'Sell Me Candy,' just to name a few), but the songs themselves just don't live up to their campy names."

== Chart performance ==
On February 9, 2008, "Breakin' Dishes" peaked at number four on the US Hot Dance Club Songs chart, where it remained for a further week. The song spent a total of 16 weeks on the chart in 2008. On May 30, 2009, the release of Good Girl Gone Bad: The Remixes caused the song to peak at number four on the US Hot Dance Club Songs chart, and it once again spent two weeks at the same position as it did the year before. "Breakin' Dishes" spent a total of 14 weeks on the chart in 2009, two weeks less than the previous year.

In 2025, following the song's viral resurgence on TikTok, and the twentieth anniversary of Rihanna's debut album, Music of the Sun (2005), "Breakin' Dishes" charted in multiple countries. It debuted at number 40 on the UK Singles Chart dated August 29, 2025, becoming Rihanna's 51st top forty single in the country, and sixth from the standard edition of Good Girl Gone Bad. Additionally, the song entered the top 50 on the ARIA Singles Chart in Australia at number 45 for the week dated September 1, 2025, and has earned a platinum certification in the country. The song also debuted at number 86 on the Billboard Hot 100, peaking at number 82 in October.

== Live performances ==
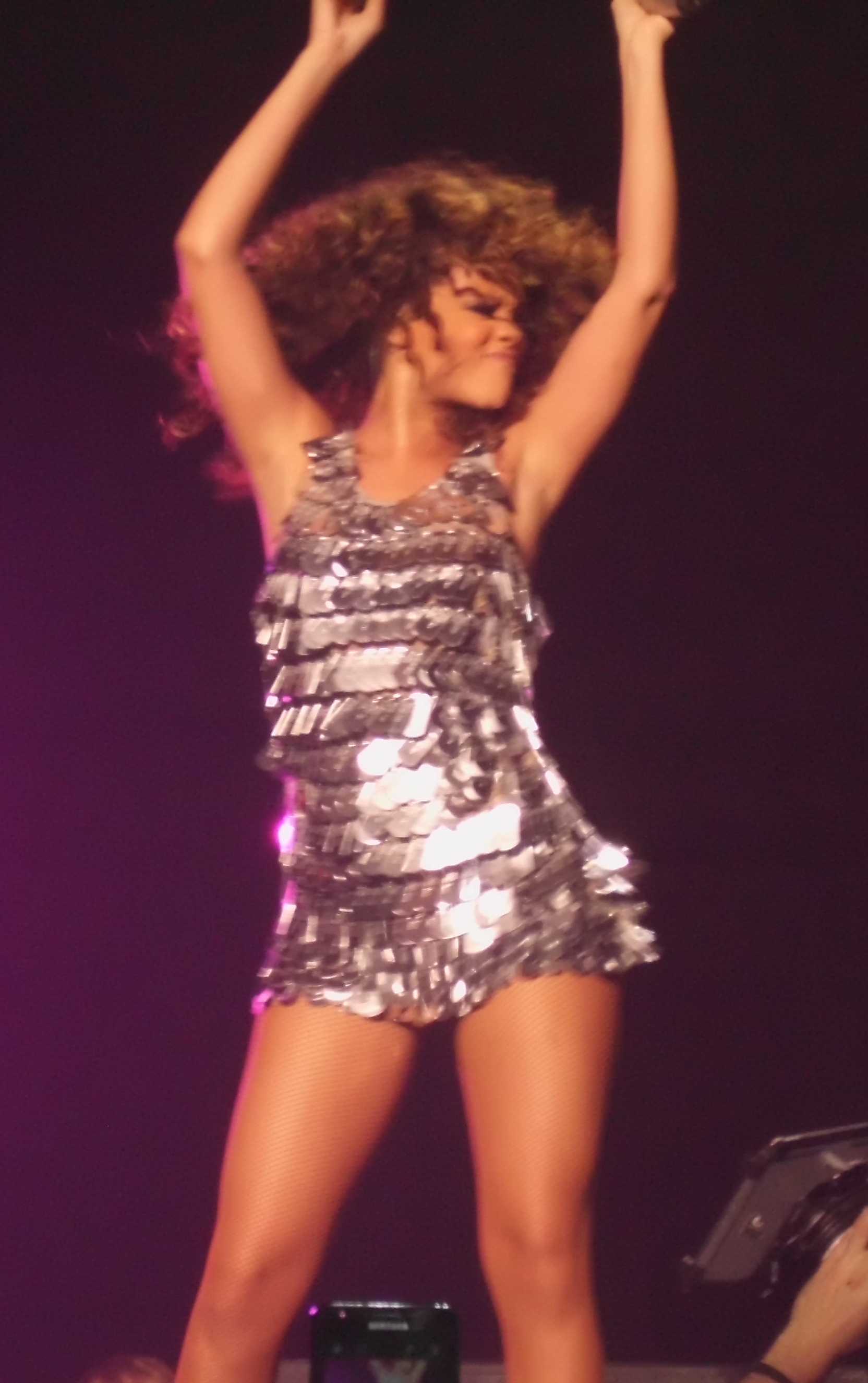
Rihanna performing "Breakin' Dishes" on the Loud Tour (2011)

"Breakin' Dishes" has only been performed twice on live television. The first performance was at BBC Radio 1's Big Weekend in May 2007. The second was at the NFL Pepsi Smash Super Bowl Bash in January 2009. The set included previous singles from Good Girl Gone Bad, "Shut Up and Drive", "Disturbia" and "Rehab"; the set featured Rihanna wearing "an all-black outfit that was a mixture of bondage gear and a space-age hockey uniform [and] thigh-high boots" Rihanna started her performance with "Disturbia" and incorporated elements of The White Stripes' "Seven Nation Army", which led into "Breakin' Dishes". After performing the song with backing dancers, who wore outfits that matched Rihanna's, the singer performed "Rehab" and "Shut Up And Drive". The song was also featured on the set of three of Rihanna's arena tours; the Good Girl Gone Bad Tour (2007–09), Last Girl on Earth Tour (2010–11) and the Loud Tour (2011). "Breakin' Dishes" appeared as the fifth song on Canadian, North American and European legs of the Good Girl Gone Bad Tour, and the second song during the Asian and Oceanic legs. Sean Sennett The Australian described the song as a "highlight" of the concert. For the Last Girl on Earth Tour, the song appeared as the eighteenth song on the set list for the North American and Australian legs, but was performed as the twentieth song for the European and Asian legs. For the Loud Tour, "Breakin' Dishes" appeared as the eleventh song on the set list for all legs of the tour.

== Formats and track listings ==
- Album version (Good Girl Gone Bad)
1. "Breakin' Dishes" – 3:20
- Album version (Good Girl Gone Bad: The Remixes)
1. "Breakin' Dishes" (Soul Seekerz remix) (edit) – 3:19
- Album version (Good Girl Gone Bad: Deluxe Edition)
1. "Breakin' Dishes" (Soul Seekerz remix) (full mix) – 6:04

== Credits and personnel ==
- Robyn Rihanna Fenty – vocals
- Tricky Stewart – songwriting, production
- The-Dream – songwriting
- Phil Tan – mixing at Soapbox Studio, Atlanta, Georgia
- Joshua Houghkirk – assistant mixer
- Judi Acosta-Stewart – production manager
- Rebecca Sweatman – production assistant
- Kuk Harrel – vocal production, Recording at Triangle Sound, Atlanta, Georgia; Pacifique Recording Studio, Hollywood, California and Westlake Recording Studios, Hollywood, California
- Mike Tocci – recording at Westlake Recording Studios, Hollywood, California

Credits adapted from the liner notes of Good Girl Gone Bad.

== Charts ==
2008 weekly chart performance
Chart (2007—09)	Peak position
Canadian Digital Song Sales (Billboard)	53
Global Dance Songs (Billboard)	24
US Hot Dance Club Songs (Billboard)	4

2024–2026 weekly chart performance
Chart (2024–2026)	Peak position
Australia (ARIA)	45
Australia Hip Hop/R&B (ARIA)	5
Austria (Ö3 Austria Top 40)	24
Canada Hot 100 (Billboard)	49
Czech Republic Singles Digital (ČNS IFPI)	33
Germany (GfK)	40
Global 200 (Billboard)	45
Greece International (IFPI)	9
Ireland (IRMA)	25
Latvia Streaming (LaIPA)	17
Lithuania (AGATA)	35
Netherlands (Single Top 100)	69
New Zealand Catalogue Singles (RMNZ)	6
Norway (VG-lista)	60
Poland (Polish Streaming Top 100)	38
Portugal (AFP)	110
Slovakia Singles Digital (ČNS IFPI)	38
Sweden (Sverigetopplistan)	55
Switzerland (Schweizer Hitparade)	46
UK Singles (Official Charts)	19
UK Hip Hop/R&B (Official Charts)	2
US Billboard Hot 100	82
US Hot Dance/Pop Songs (Billboard)	6

== Certifications ==
Certifications
Region	Certification	Certified units/sales
Australia (ARIA)	2× Platinum	140,000^{‡}
Denmark (IFPI Danmark)	Gold	45,000^{‡}
Germany (BVMI)	Gold	300,000^{‡}
New Zealand (RMNZ)	2× Platinum	60,000^{‡}
Spain (Promusicae)	Gold	50,000^{‡}
United Kingdom (BPI)	Platinum	600,000^{‡}
United States (RIAA)	Platinum	1,000,000^{‡}
Streaming
Greece (IFPI Greece)	Platinum	2,000,000^{†}
^{‡} Sales+streaming figures based on certification alone.^{†} Streaming-only figures based on certification alone.
