= Everything I Wanted (Dannii Minogue song) =

1997 single by Dannii Minogue

Single by Dannii Minogue

from the album Girl
- Released: 20 October 1997
- Length: 4:37
- Label: Eternal; Warner Music Group
- Songwriter(s): Dannii Minogue; Mark Taylor; Steve Torch
- Producer(s): Metro

Dannii Minogue singles chronology
"All I Wanna Do" (1997)	"Everything I Wanted" (1997)	"Disremembrance" (1998)

"Everything I Wanted" is a pop–dance song written by Dannii Minogue, Mark Taylor and Steve Torch for Minogue's third studio album, Girl (1997). The song was produced by Metro and received a positive reception from music critics. It was released as the album's second single on 20 October 1997. In Australia, the song only managed to peak at number 44. It was a bigger hit in the United Kingdom, reaching number fifteen and going on to sell 70,000 copies, as well as achieving success on the Upfront Club dance chart, where it reached the top position, becoming Minogue's second single to do so.

== Critical reception ==
British magazine Music Week rated the song four out of five, adding, "Dannii currently finds herself as the most favoured of the Minogue sisters, and this classy drum & bass-style workout satisfies both artistically and melodically."

== Music video ==
"Everything I Wanted" features a music video directed by Steve Shaw and was filmed in Las Vegas, Nevada in 1997. The video, filmed in black and white on a 16mm camera, features Minogue driving through Las Vegas in a convertible, dancing in her hotel room and swimming in a pool. Minogue and her then boyfriend Shaw came up with the idea for the video in mid-1997 and travelled alone in the United States, without a production crew, so they could capture Minogue in spontaneous and real-life moments. Shaw decided to use a 16mm handheld camera to film the video as it gave the music video a texture that the majority of the other pop videos did not have.

A personal favourite of Minogue's, the video for "Everything I Wanted" was included on the Australian video collection The Videos in 1998 and the special edition of her greatest hits CD/DVD release The Hits & Beyond in 2006.

== Track listings ==
- CD maxi-single 1
1. "Everything I Wanted" (radio edit) – 3:44
2. "Everything I Wanted" (Xenomania radio edit) – 4:46
3. "Everything I Wanted" (album version) – 4:37
4. "Everything I Wanted" (Xenomania 12-inch mix) – 7:09
- CD maxi-single 2
1. "Everything I Wanted" (Trouser Enthusiasts' Golden Delicious mix) – 11:14
2. "Everything I Wanted" (Jupiter 6 Soul Surround mix) – 6:54
3. "Everything I Wanted" (Xenomania 12-inch instrumental) – 7:08
4. "Everything I Wanted" (Trouser Enthusiasts Liquid Silk dub) – 11:10
- UK cassette single
1. "Everything I Wanted" (radio edit) – 3:44
2. "Everything I Wanted" (Xenomania radio edit) – 4:46
3. "Everything I Wanted" (album version) – 4:37

== Charts ==
Chart (1997)	Peak position
Australia (ARIA)	44
Europe (Eurochart Hot 100 Singles)	77
Scotland (OCC)	16
UK Singles (OCC)	15
