= Soul Seekerz =

English dance music group

- Origin: London, England
- Genres: House, dance
- Years active: 2005-present
- Labels: Positiva, EMI
- Members: Julian Napolitano; Simon Langford

Soul Seekerz (also known under the names Soulseekerz, Soulseekers and The Soul Seekerz) are an English dance music group and remix/production duo composed of DJ and producers Julian Napolitano and Simon Langford.

== Biography ==
Soul Seekerz are Julian Napolitano and Simon Langford who have each had their own UK Top 20 successes in the past. They formed Soul Seekerz in 2005 as a "collective" of DJs and producers, each with their own unique abilities and insights and contribution to make to the unique sound. Whilst not every member will work on any given production, they feel it is the different influences within the "collective" that give Soul Seekerz their particular sound and allow them to develop over time.

They are best known for their 2005 collaboration "Perfection" with Dannii Minogue which gave them their first success on the UK Singles Chart, reaching number 11. The track also peaked at number 13 on the Australian singles chart and at number 7 on the Official Finnish Charts.

The group also produces remixes, working on songs for artists including Rihanna, The Ting Tings, Hannah Montana, Britney Spears and Estelle.

== Discography ==
=== Singles ===
- "Perfection" (2005) - UK No. 11
- "Party for the Weekend" (2007)
- "Reach for the Love" (2008)
- "You're Not Alone" (2009)
- "Dancing on the Ceiling" (2010)
- "What I Need" (2016)

=== Selected remixes ===
- "1 Thing" - Amerie
- "6 of 1 Thing" - Craig David
- "American Boy" - Estelle (No. 2 Billboard Hot Dance Airplay)
- "Angel in the Night" - Basshunter
- "Are You Ready" - Hannah Montana
- "B Boy Baby" - Mutya Buena feat. Amy Winehouse
- "Be Mine!" - Robyn
- "Beautiful U R" - Deborah Cox (No. 1 Billboard Hot Dance Club Play)
- "Break the Ice" - Britney Spears (No. 5 Billboard Hot Dance Airplay, No. 1 Billboard Hot Dance Club Play)
- "Breakin' Dishes" - Rihanna (No. 4 Billboard Hot Dance Club Play)
- "Dance Like There's No Tomorrow" - Paula Abdul & Randy Jackson
- "Daddy O" - Wideboys feat. Shaznay Lewis
- "Don't Mess with My Man" - Lucy Pearl
- "Don't Upset the Rhythm (Go Baby Go)" - The Noisettes
- "Follow Me Home" - Sugababes
- "Good Friend and a Glass of Wine - LeAnn Rimes
- "Good Girl Gone Bad" - Rihanna
- "Gonna Be Mine" - Addictive feat. T2
- "Handle Me" - Robyn (No. 4 Billboard Hot Dance Airplay)
- "Hush Boy" - Basement Jaxx
- "I Know UR Girlfriend Hates Me" - Annie
- "I Luv U Baby" - The Original
- "Into the Nightlife" - Cyndi Lauper (No. 1 Billboard Hot Dance Club Play)
- "Je Suis Une Dolly" - The Dolly Rockers
- "Jai Ho" - The Pussycat Dolls
- "Just in Love" - Joe Jonas
- "Kiss Me Thru the Phone" - Soulja Boy Tell'Em
- "Kto Tam" - Kamaliya
- "Like A Boy" - Ciara (No. 10 Billboard Hot Dance Airplay)
- "Lovelight" - Robbie Williams
- "Lovin' You"' - Kristine W
- "Look on the Floor" - Bananarama
- "Me" - Tamia
- "Moves Like Jagger" - Maroon 5 feat. Christina Aguilera
- "My Heart Takes Over" - The Saturdays
- "Nothin' Better To Do" - LeAnn Rimes
- "On the Run" - Electro Giant Beatz feat. Michelle Williams
- "Open Your Eyes" - Kamaliya
- "Paranoid" - Jonas Brothers
- "Radar" - Britney Spears
- "Rising Up" - Kamaliya
- "Satellites" - September
- "Say It" - Rihanna
- "So Under Pressure" - Dannii Minogue
- "Some Kinda Rush" - Booty Luv
- "Sometimes Like Butterflies" (with Simon Langford) - Kristine W
- "Stereo Hearts" - Gym Class Heroes feat. Adam Levine
- "Sunshine in the Rain – The Album" - BWO
- "Take a Chance on Me" - JLS
- "That's Not My Name" - The Ting Tings
- "Touch Me Like That" - Dannii Minogue vs Jason Nevins
- "Wannabe" - Spice Girls
- "You've Got Too..." - The Young Punx
