= Perfection (song) =

2005 single by Dannii Minogue and Soul Seekerz

Single by Dannii Minogue and Soul Seekerz

from the album Club Disco and The Hits & Beyond
- B-side: "I've Been Waiting for You"
- Released: 17 October 2005
- Recorded: 2005
- Genre: Disco house
- Length: 3:27
- Label: All Around the World; Universal; Central Station
- Songwriters: Peter Jackson Jr.; Gerald Jackson; Rob Davis; Dannii Minogue; Therese Grankvist; Simon Langford; Julian Napolitano
- Producer: Soul Seekerz

Dannii Minogue singles chronology
"You Won't Forget About Me" (2004)	"Perfection" (2005)	"So Under Pressure" (2006)

"Perfection" is a song performed by Australian singer Dannii Minogue and the Soul Seekerz. It served as the second single from Minogue's fifth album, Club Disco (2007). The song was written by Minogue, Peter Jackson Jr., Gerald Jackson, Rob Davis, Therese Grankvist, Simon Langford, and Julian Napolitano. The song was based on "Turn Me Upside Down" by The Soul Seekerz which sampled "Turn the Beat Around" originally performed by disco singer Vicki Sue Robinson.

It was released as a single on 17 October 2005 in the United Kingdom. It entered the top twenty in the UK and became Minogue's ninth consecutive Upfront Club Chart number one. In Australia, "Perfection" was released on 30 January 2006. The track peaked within the top twenty and became Minogue's eighth top twenty single.

== Background and reception ==
"Perfection" began as an instrumental track by the Soul Seekerz that samples "Turn The Beat Around (Love to Hear Percussions)", which was originally performed by disco singer Vicki Sue Robinson. Simon Langford decided to sample the song after watching the end credits for the film The Specialist. Langford, excited by his song idea, phoned his writing partner Julian Napolitano. Two days later, Napolitano had completed close to seventy percent of the song, much to the surprise of Langford, who had been preoccupied with paper work. After completing the instrumental track, the group were approached by All Around the World Records, who wanted to use the track for a song by Minogue. Minogue, Rob Davis and Therese Grankvist then wrote lyrics to accompany the music composed by the Soul Seekerz.

In a review for AllMusic, John Lucas called the song a "painfully generic attempt at recapturing former glories" and "beneath someone of Minogue's calibre". He also criticized Minogue's vocals, calling them "uninspired".

== Chart performance ==
"Perfection" was officially released in the United Kingdom on 17 October 2005. The song debuted on the UK Singles Chart on 25 October 2005 at number eleven, selling 7,717 copies in its first week of release. The track became Minogue's ninth consecutive Upfront Club Chart number one in the UK. In Ireland, the song reached number thirty-eight, remaining on the singles chart for one week. The song was also successful in Europe. It reached number seven in Finland and number sixteen in the Netherlands.

The track was released in Australia on 30 January 2006. It debuted on 7 February 2006 at number thirteen and became Minogue's seventh top twenty single. The song remained on the singles chart for four weeks, exiting on 7 March 2006. It was the 49th-highest-selling single for 2006 in Australia by an Australian artist and the 26th highest selling dance single.

== Music video ==
Minogue dancing on a cliff top in the music video.

The music video for "Perfection" was directed by Rob Kaplan. The video features Minogue dancing on a yacht and a rocky cliff top. It begins with Minogue dressed in a black outfit and pink umbrella dancing on the bow of the yacht. She is then shown on the cliff top dressed in a red hooded outfit. The scenes featuring Minogue are intercut with scenes of male dancers and waves crashing up against the yacht. It was released commercially on The Hits & Beyond special edition companion DVD, released in June 2006.

== Formats and track listings ==
UK CD single 1
(CDGLOBE483; Released on 17 October 2005)

1. "Perfection" (radio edit) – 3:31
2. "Perfection" (extended mix) – 6:26
3. "Perfection" (Dancing DJs remix) – 6:10
4. "Turn Me Upside Down" (original 12" instrumental) – 6:29
5. "Perfection" (Seamus Haji & Paul Emmanuel remix) – 8:00
6. "Perfection" (Koishii & Hush remix) - 7:54

UK CD single 2
(CXGLOBE483; Released on 17 October 2005)

1. "Perfection" (radio edit) – 3:31
2. "I've Been Waiting for You" (Ian Masterson, Minogue, Terry Ronald) – 4:34

UK 12-inch picture disc
(12GLOBE483; Released on 17 October 2005)

1. "Perfection" (extended mix) – 6:26
2. "Turn Me Upside Down" (original 12" instrumental) – 6:29
3. "Perfection" (Moto Blanco dub) – 7:24
4. "Perfection" (Kenny Hayes remix) – 6:50

Australian CD single 1
(CSRCD50499; Released on 30 January 2006)

1. "Perfection" (radio edit) – 3:31
2. "Perfection" (extended mix) – 6:26
3. "Perfection" (Dancing DJs remix) – 6:10
4. "Turn Me Upside Down" (original 12" instrumental) – 6:29
5. "Perfection" (Seamus Haji & Emmanuel remix) – 8:00
6. "Perfection" (Koishii & Hush remix) – 7:54

Australian CD single 2
(CSRCD50501; Released on 30 January 2006)

1. "Perfection" (radio edit) – 3:31
2. "I've Been Waiting for You" – 4:34
3. "Perfection" (Ruff Diamond remix)
4. "Perfection" (Seamus Haji & Emmanuel instrumental)
5. "Perfection" (video)

== Personnel ==
The following people contributed to "Perfection":

- Dannii Minogue – lead vocals
- Therese Grankvist – backing vocals
- Soul Seekerz – production
- Philip Larsen, Rob Davis – vocal production
- Cody Burridge – photography

== Charts ==
Weekly chart performance for "Perfection"
Chart (2005–2006)	Peak position
Australia (ARIA)	13
Finland (Suomen virallinen lista)	7
Hungary (Dance Top 40)	39
Ireland (IRMA)	38
Netherlands (Dutch Top 40)	16
Scotland Singles (OCC)	13
UK Singles (OCC)	11
UK Dance (OCC)	5
