= So Under Pressure =

2006 single by Dannii Minogue

Single by Dannii Minogue

from the album Club Disco and The Hits & Beyond
- B-side: "Feel Like I Do"
- Released: 12 June 2006
- Recorded: 2005
- Studio: AATW
- Genre: Dance-pop
- Length: 3:52
- Label: All Around the World; Universal; Central Station
- Songwriters: Dannii Minogue; Lee Monteverde; Michael Ward; Terry Ronald
- Producer: Lee Monteverde

Dannii Minogue singles chronology
"Perfection" (2005)	"So Under Pressure" (2006)	"I Can't Sleep at Night" (2007)

Audio sample
- file; help

"So Under Pressure" is a dance-pop song performed by Australian singer Dannii Minogue. The song was written by Minogue, Terry Ronald and LMC, and produced by Lee Monteverde for Minogue's fifth album Club Disco (2007) and was also used as the lead single for her greatest hits compilation The Hits & Beyond (2006). The song's lyrics discuss the cancer diagnoses of Minogue's sister Kylie and an unnamed friend.

The song was released as a single on 12 June 2006 in the United Kingdom. It entered the top 40 in Australia, Ireland and the UK and became Minogue's tenth consecutive Upfront Club Chart number one. The song's music video, directed by Phil Griffin, features Minogue in a variety of high pressure situations. She has described it as "the hardest video I've ever done".

== Background and reception ==
In 2005, Minogue began writing and recording material with longtime collaborator Terry Ronald and British dance group LMC. During one of their sessions, they penned "So Under Pressure", which was inspired by the cancer diagnoses of her sister Kylie as well as that of an unnamed friend. Minogue has described the recording of "So Under Pressure" as a "real achievement" as she was "brave enough to put all [her feelings] into words". Allmusic reviewer John Lucas called the track one of "Minogue's more inventive moments".

== Chart performance ==
"So Under Pressure" was officially released in the United Kingdom and Ireland on 12 June 2006. The song debuted on the UK Singles Chart on 19 June 2006 at number 20. The following week, "So Under Pressure" fell to number sixty and exited the chart in its third week of release. The track became Minogue's tenth consecutive Upfront Club Chart number one in the UK. In Ireland, the song reached number 31, remaining on the singles chart for one week. "So Under Pressure" proved popular in Irish dance clubs where it reached number six on the Dance Singles Chart.

The track was released in Australia on 29 July 2006. It debuted on 8 August 2006 at number 16 and became Minogue's eighth top-20 single. The song remained on the ARIA Singles Chart for five weeks, exiting on 5 September 2006. It was the 30th-highest-selling dance single in Australia for 2006.

== Music video ==
Minogue with a white python in a scene from the music video.

The music video was directed by Phil Griffin in mid-2006. Minogue described the video:

"I tried to put different things in the video that made me feel under pressure and it really did! It was the hardest video I`ve ever done so I kept thinking, why on earth did I come up with this concept? People don’t realise but I definitely have that Australian tomboy side to me. I love snakes and sharks and jumping out of planes and stuff. Growing up it never occurred to me that it wasn’t a girly thing to ride a bike, covered in mud holding frogs and collecting lizards!".

The music video's crew did not believe that Minogue could work with the python, but she said that it did not bother her at all. The music video was released commercially on The Hits & Beyond special edition companion DVD, released in June 2006.

The video opens with a scene of Minogue in a white room dressed in a black swimsuit. She is then shown lying on top of a white platform with a python wrapped around her body. Scenes of Minogue and her three dancers walking a catwalk, posing for photographs and dancing are intercut throughout the music video. The video concludes with Minogue trapped inside a spinning perspex box.

== Formats and track listings ==
UK CD single 1

1. "So Under Pressure" (radio edit) – 3:20
2. "So Under Pressure" (Soulseekerz remix) – 7:48
3. "So Under Pressure" (extended mix) – 6:43
4. "So Under Pressure" (Steve Pitron remix) – 7:13
5. "So Under Pressure" (Riffs & Rays remix) – 8:05
6. "So Under Pressure" (Thriller Jill remix) – 8:19
7. "So Under Pressure" music video

UK CD single 2

1. "So Under Pressure" (radio edit) – 3:20
2. "Feel Like I Do" (Danni Minogue, Jean-Claude Ades, Hannah Robinson) – 3:48

UK 12-inch vinyl single

1. "So Under Pressure" (extended mix) – 6:43
2. "So Under Pressure" (Soulseekerz remix) – 7:48

Australian CD single 1

1. "So Under Pressure" (radio edit) – 3:22
2. "So Under Pressure" (Soul Seekerz remix / Soul Seekerz extended) – 7:47
3. "So Under Pressure" (extended mix / LMC extended mix) – 6:42
4. "So Under Pressure" (Steve Pitron remix) – 7:12
5. "So Under Pressure" (Riffs & Rays remix) – 6:47
6. "So Under Pressure" (Thriller Jill remix) – 8:02

Australian CD single 2

1. "So Under Pressure" (Soul Seekerz extended / Soul Seekerz remix) – 7:48
2. "So Under Pressure" (LMC extended mix / extended mix) – 6:42
3. "So Under Pressure" (Express Theory mix) – 5:52
4. "So Under Pressure" (Soul Seekerz dub) – 7:48
5. "So Under Pressure" (radio edit) – 3:22
6. "Feel Like I Do" – 3:49
7. "So Under Pressure" music video

== Personnel ==
The following people contributed to "So Under Pressure":

- Dannii Minogue – lead vocals
- Justine Riddock – backing vocals
- Lee Monteverde – keyboards
- Chris Martin – guitar
- Terry Ronald – backing vocals, additional vocal production
- Recorded and mixed at AATW Studios

== Charts ==
=== Weekly charts ===
Weekly chart performance for "So Under Pressure"
Chart (2006)	Peak position
Australia (ARIA)	16
Australian Dance (ARIA)	2
CIS Airplay (TopHit)	38
Ireland (IRMA)	31
Ireland Dance (IRMA)	6
Scotland Singles (OCC)	13
UK Singles (OCC)	20
UK Dance (OCC)	11

=== Year-end charts ===
Year-end chart performance for "So Under Pressure"
Chart (2006)	Position
Australian Dance (ARIA)	30
