= Disremembrance =

1998 single by Dannii Minogue

Single by Dannii Minogue

from the album Girl
- Released: 16 March 1998
- Genre: Europop
- Length: 4:05
- Label: Eternal; Warner Music Group
- Songwriters: David Green; Ian Masterson
- Producer: Flexifinger

Dannii Minogue singles chronology
"Everything I Wanted" (1997)	"Disremembrance" (1998)	"Coconut" (1998)

"Disremembrance" is a song written by David Green and Ian Masterson for Australian singer Dannii Minogue's third studio album, Girl (1997). The song was produced by Flexifinger and received a positive reception from music critics. It was released by Eternal and Warner Music Group as the third single on 16 March 1998 and peaked at number 21 in the United Kingdom. In Australia, the song narrowly missed peaking within the top 50, reaching number 53 and spending five weeks in the top 100.

== Critical reception ==
A reviewer from Music Week declared the song as "an equally fast-paced, Europop hit" as Minogue's previous two singles, "worthy of a Eurovision Song Contest entrant. Produced by Flexifinger and with remixes by the same, Twyce As Nice and Trouser Enhusiasts, the hook isn't quite strong enough for it to hang around in the charts, but it will sell."

== Track listings ==
- CD maxi-single 1
1. "Disremembrance" (Flexifinger's Radio Edit) – 4:05
2. "Disremembrance" (Trouser Enthusiasts' Brittlestar Requiem Mix) – 12:16
3. "Disremembrance" (D-Bop's Lost In Space Mix) – 8:06
4. "Disremembrance" (Sharp Rocket Remix) – 8:04
5. "Disremembrance" (Twice As Nyce Dub Mix) – 5:44
- CD maxi-single 2
1. "Disremembrance" (Flexifinger's Radio Edit) – 4:05
2. "Disremembrance" (Flexifinger's Ext. "Orchestral" Mix) – 9:31
3. "Disremembrance" (Xenomania 12" Mix) – 7:42
4. "Disremembrance" (Xenomania "Breakbeat" Mix) – 7:42
5. "Disremembrance" (Flexifinger's 12" Pop Mix) – 6:26
6. "Disremembrance" music video
- Cassette single
1. "Disremembrance" (Flexifinger's Radio Edit) – 4:02
2. "Disremembrance" (Xenomania Edit) – 4:25
3. "Disremembrance" (Trouser Enthusiast's Radio Edit) – 4:27
- Additional remixes

The following remixes were commissioned but not released on the commercial releases of "Disremembrance".

1. "Disremembrance" (Trouser Enthusiasts' Diesel Plus Plus Dub) - 9:59
2. "Disremembrance" (Trouser Enthusiasts' Radio Edit) - 4:43 ( released on the cassette single, and later released on the "Girl" reissue)
3. "Disremembrance" (Sharp Rocket Instrumental)
4. "Disremembrance" (Twice As Nyce 1:40 AM Mix) - 6:06 (later released on the "Girl" reissue)
5. "Disremembrance" (Xenomania Edit) - 4:25

== Charts ==
Chart (1998)	Peak position
Australia (ARIA)	53
Europe (Eurochart Hot 100)	96
Scotland Singles (OCC)	19
UK Singles (OCC)	21
