= Matt Zarley =

American singer-songwriter

- Born: Peoria, Illinois, U.S.
- Genres: Pop, Dance, Musical Theatre
- Occupations: Singer-songwriter, Actor, Producer
- Years active: 1981–present
- Website: www.mattzarley.com

Matt Zarley is an American singer-songwriter, musical theatre performer, and LGBTQ+ advocate. He began his professional career on Broadway before gaining recognition in the pop and dance music scenes. Zarley is known for his expressive tenor voice, LGBTQ-centered storytelling, and award-winning musical works such as Change Begins With Me and the short film hopefulROMANTIC. He was the first openly gay man featured in People magazine’s “Top 50 Bachelor” issue, and continues to use his platform to support queer youth and promote positive representation in media.

== Early life ==
Zarley was born in Peoria, Illinois, and raised in the Midwest of New Jersey, before settling in Southern California at 11 years old. His early interest in dance and musical performance began at the age of 12, leading him to pursue a career in the performing arts. He started working professionally as a teenager and eventually transitioned to Broadway in his early 20s.

== Stage and television career ==
Zarley made his television debut at 17 years old on the TV series, Fame, and his theatrical debut later that same year in the national tour of Cats. At the time, he was the youngest performer ever cast in the musical. He later appeared in the Broadway productions of A Chorus Line, Joseph and the Amazing Technicolor Dreamcoat, The Who’s Tommy, and Chicago. His stage work includes roles on Broadway, off-Broadway, national tours, and regional theatre.

Zarley made his Broadway debut at 19 years old in A Chorus Line, cast in the role of Mark Anthony. Later, Zarley went on to play the role of Mike Costa for both the European tour and Paris premiere of the same show.

He also directed and starred in the 2012 music video “Change Begins With Me”, which featured fellow Broadway performers Hector Van Silva and Chuck Saculla. The video was spotlighted by Playbill in their "Screening Room" feature. In addition to stage roles, Zarley has appeared in TV commercials and special appearances on shows including The Rosie O’Donnell Show and The Drew Carey Show, as well as roles in TV movies including Disney's Cinderella (with Whitney Houston), Geppetto (with Drew Carey), and Annie (with Kathy Bates).

== Theatre ==
=== Performance History ===
Sources: Playbill Vault; Broadway World, IBDb Broadway Database

Year	Production	Venue	Acting Credit (Role)
Jul 1975 - Apr 1990	A Chorus Line	Broadway	Mark Anthony (Replacement)
Jul 1975 - Apr 1990	A Chorus Line	European Tour	Mike Costa (Replacement)
Sep 1986 - Sep 1988	Cats (Third National Tour)	Broadway	Pouncival (Original) Mistoffelees (Understudy) Mungojerrie (Understudy)
Jul 1990 - Aug 1990	The Life	Off-Broadway (Showcase)	Bull (Original)
Feb 1993 - Aug 1993 Nov 1993 - May 1994	Joseph and the Amazing Technicolor Dreamcoat	Broadway Broadway Revival	Joseph (Understudy - Original) Apache Dancer (Replacement) Zebulon (Replacement)
Jan 1995 - Dec 1996	Joseph and the Amazing Technicolor Dreamcoat	Touring	Apache Dancer (Original) Zebulon (Original)
Apr 1993 - Jun 1995	The Who's Tommy	Broadway	1st Pinball Lad (Replacement) Allied Solder #1 (Replacement) Ensemble (Replacement) Local Lad (Replacement) Security Guard (Replacement) Tommy (Understudy - Replacement)
Sept 2003	Chess	Broadway	The CHESS Choir (Original)
Dec 2003	Children of Eden	Off-Broadway (New York Concert)	Ensemble
Mar 2004 - Jun 2004	Chicago	National	Fred Casely Billy Flynn (Understudy)

== Filmography ==
=== Film, Television, and Shorts ===
Sources: IMDBb Database

Year	Title	Notes	Ref
1997	Cinderella	Television movie	Dancer (uncredited)
1999	Annie	Television movie (Disney)	Male Dancer
2000	Geppetto	Television movie	Resident of Idyllia
2000	The Drew Carey Show	TV series – 1 episode: S5.E25 "Drew and Kate Boink"	Dancer #19
2013 - 2015	Where the Bears Are	Web Series: S2.E24 "Thanksgiving Special"; S4.E15–"Wedding Bears, Part 1"; S4.E15–"Wedding Bears, Part 2"	Andrew Simms / Wedding Singer #1 (Himself)
2015	Hopeful Romantic	Short Film: Best Shorts Competition – Award of Excellence (2014); Hollywood Reel Independent Film Festival – Best Short Film (LGBT Short Film Category) (2015); Cinema Diverse: Palm Springs LGBT Film Festival – Festival Favorite (Short Film Category) (2015); Chelsea Film Festival – Best Supporting Actor (George Takei) (2015)	Executive Producer / Writer / Lead (Himself)
2018	Can You Take My Picture	Short Film: Best Drama – LAIFF November Award (2018); Best Drama Shorts – LAIFF November Award (2018)	Producer
2020	Stars in the House	TV series (Talk Show) – 1 episode: S1.E282 "With Love, Now And Forever! CATS4COVIDRELIEF"	Self
2020	Currents	Short Film	Producer
2023	11 o'Clock Number	TV series (Musical) – 12 episodes	Executive Producer / Writer / Lead (Zack Matthews)
2023	Studio One Forever	Documentary	Co-Executive Producer / Feature
2024	Viva Verdi!	Documentary	Executive Producer / Feature
2024	Worst Date, Best Date	Short Film (Comedy)	Executive Producer
2024	Literal Nightmare	Short Film	Sound Designer / Singer
2025	They Kiss	Short Film (Comedy)	Producer / Editor / Actor (Chad)

== Discography ==
=== Albums ===
- 2002: Debut
- 2008: Here I Am
- 2012: Change Begins With Me
- 2015: hopefulROMANTIC
- 2017: The Estrogen Sessions
- 2023: 11 o'Clock Number

=== Singles ===
- 2002: “You Always Want (who u ain’t got)”
- 2008: “Had I Known”
- 2008: “Here I Am”
- 2010: “Where Did You Come From”
- 2012: “WTF”
- 2012: “Perfect”
- 2012: “Trust Me”
- 2012: "One More Christmas With You”
- 2015: “I Look To You”
- 2015: “Miss You Most (At Christmas Time)”
- 2018: “I’ll Never Love Again”
- 2018: “I Don’t Wanna Love Somebody Else”
- 2018: “Your Song”
- 2019: “Dear Future Husband”
- 2019: “Don’t Save It All For Christmas Day”

=== Other Releases ===
- 1994: Joseph and the Amazing Technicolor Dreamcoat (Broadway Revival Cast)
- 1997: Cole Porter: A Musical Toast
- 1999: Annie (Original soundtrack–Disney)
- 2000: Geppetto (TV soundtrack)
- 2002: Being Out Rocks
- 2009: While You See A Chance (feat. Billy Porter)

== Visual albums and music videos ==
In 2015, Zarley wrote, produced, and starred in hopefulROMANTIC, an award-winning musical short film that chronicles the life of a romantic relationship. The nearly dialogue-free narrative is told almost entirely through music, and co-starred Chuck Saculla, Jolie Jenkins, and George Takei. The short film appeared in several film festivals around the globe, including the Cannes Short Film Festival, and won several festival awards.

In 2023, he launched 11 o’Clock Number, a 12-episode web series and visual album. The series, created during the COVID-19 pandemic, features Zarley's reinterpretations of iconic musical theatre songs, which were all originally sung by women. The narrative-driven series was inspired by his mother's death years prior–featuring appearances from Billy Porter, Jason Graae, Kathy Deitch, Marty Thomas, Jolie Jenkins, and Barbara Deutsch. Zarley described the project as a “cathartic quarantine project” that turned into a full-scale production highlighting "personal and collective resilience".

== Recognition and awards ==
Zarley has received multiple awards and recognitions for his music and films:

- 2002 – "You Always Want (who u ain’t got)” named the #5 Top Club Play, under Billboard's Hot Dance Breakouts.
- 2008 – Zarley's single, “Had I Known”, made the Billboard Critics' Top 10 of the Year.
- 2008 – The single “Here I Am” was chosen by the producers of American Idol as a Top 10 finalist in the second ever American Idol Songwriter Contest.
- 2009 – "While You See A Chance (feat. Billy Porter)” made the Billboard Dance: Hot Dance Club Songs.
- 2012:
  - April 2012 – Zarley was the first openly gay man featured in People magazine’s annual "Bachelor" issue in 2012; speaking frequently about the need for increased LGBTQ representation and visibility in media.
  - June 2012 – "Trust Me” made the Billboard Dance: Dance Club Songs.
  - December 2012 – "Change Begins With Me" received the OutMusic Awards Album and Single of the Year.
  - December 2012 – Zarley was named in Billboard Readers’ Favorites Of 2012, #7–"Trust Me (Moto Blonco Radio Edit)" and #39–"W T F”.
- 2014 – "Somebody 4 Everybody" named Best Electronic or Dance Song in the RightOutTV Music And Video Awards.

== Charity and advocacy ==
Zarley has been a committed advocate for LGBTQ+ youth support, anti-bullying and broader social causes through community-centered fundraising, performance and collaboration:

Date	Event	Ref.
2002 (Oct)	Zarley took part with fellow LGBTQ+ artists in creating to the benefit compilation “Being Out Rocks.” Contributing “Say Goodbye” to the 21-track album, produced by and benefiting the Human Rights Campaign (HRC) Foundation and Centaur Entertainment.	
2011 (Feb)	Zarley released a cover of Pat Benatar’s “We Belong” as a charity single to benefit The Trevor Project, with all proceeds directed to the organization’s LGBTQ youth support and crisis intervention services.	
2012 (June)	Paint the Town for Trevor (Washington, D.C.): Zarley performed at the third annual Pride fundraiser in Washington, D.C., hosted at Town, raising funds for The Trevor Project.	
2012 (June)	Broadway Bares Beach Burlesque (Fire Island, NY): Zarley headlined at Fire Island with his single “We Belong” as part of fundraising performances tied to Broadway Bares, whose proceeds typically support Broadway Cares/Equity Fights AIDS and allied LGBTQ+ causes.	
2014 (Jan)	Broadway Bares Winter Burlesque (NYC, NY): As part of the 24th season of the Broadway Bares series, Zarley performed his song “Somebody 4 Everybody” at XL Nightclub, benefiting Broadway Cares/Equity Fights AIDS.	
2015 (Dec)	Zarley joins the star studded cast of SPARKLE, an annual LA Holiday Concert based in Los Angeles benefitting the Actors Fund.	
2017 (May)	S.T.A.G.E. Benefit Concert at Saban Theatre (Beverly Hills, CA): Zarley appeared alongside other stars at a fundraising concert to support the Anaheim Performing Arts Center.	
2017 (May)	Desert's Got Talent Charity Event (Palm Springs, CA): Performed at this special show benefiting Boo2Bullying.org, an anti-bullying organization.	
2017 (May)	Hooray For Anaheim Gala 2017 (Anaheim, CA): Benefit concert where Zarley performed alongside other stars, funds raised went towards the Anaheim Performing Arts Center Foundation.	
2017 (May)	LA LA LAND In Concert Premiere (Hollywood Bowl): Zarley took part in the world-premiere concert event of LA LA LAND at the iconic Hollywood Bowl—a high-profile community and arts event.	
2018 (Dec)	Zarley and Jeb Havens record the holiday single "I'm Your Angel," with all proceeds benefiting the Backpacks For The Street; an organization which offers aid and support for homeless LGBT youth.	
2019 (May)	Zarley recorded a cover of Des’ree’s “You Gotta Be” along with Billy Porter, donating all proceeds to the Los Angeles LGBT Youth Center.	
2020 (Oct)	Stars in the House - Labor Day Special: Zarley joined fellow Cats alumni JoAnn Hunter and Randy Slovacek on ‘‘Stars in the House’’, a live-streamed fundraising series supporting The Actors Fund during the COVID-19 pandemic.	

Zarley Family Foundation – As vice president of the family-founded private foundation, Zarley has helped direct charitable grants to numerous organizations, including The Trevor Project, Starkey Hearing Foundation, Casa Pacifica, Boys Town, Boys & Girls Club, and Broadway Cares.

== Personal life ==
Zarley is openly gay and lives in Los Angeles. His creative projects often reflect his personal experiences, particularly themes of heartbreak, authenticity, and personal growth. He has stated that living openly and truthfully is essential to his artistry.

He has also expressed a desire to write a Broadway musical and develop a television series centered on LGBTQ narratives.
