= LMC (British band) =

British electronic music trio

LMC are an English dance group consisting of producers Lee Monteverde, Matt Cadman and Cris Nuttall. They have performed remixes for Scooter, Erasure, Dannii Minogue, Lasgo, Flip & Fill, Robert Palmer and Shania Twain. LMC is best known for the track "Take Me to the Clouds Above" with vocals from Rachel McFarlane, features an interpolation of Whitney Houston's "How Will I Know" and a sample of U2's "With or Without You" which topped the UK Singles Chart in early 2004, as well as going top 5 in Ireland and top 10 in Australia.

== Chart success ==
A promo-only track "Everything U Need" reached the top ten of the UK club chart in 2002. The song "Take Me to the Clouds Above" featured lyrics from "How Will I Know" from Whitney Houston's self-titled album set to a sample from "With or Without You" from U2's The Joshua Tree album.

The track was sung by Rachel McFarlane, who had previously been a vocalist for UK outfits Loveland and N-Trance. In the late 1990s, McFarlane had a solo record deal and her song "Lover" was a UK hit in 1998. This song was bootlegged as "Found an Angel" by placing "Lover" over Paul van Dyk's "For an Angel", which became a club hit.

All of the members of U2 had to clear the track. Bassist Adam Clayton said: "It's a good beat and you can dance to it. I especially like the bassline".

The track was released in the UK on 26 January 2004 as "Take Me to the Clouds Above" by LMC vs U2. The track became the most played track on UK radio and debuted at number one in February 2004, selling 300,000 copies. Due to the success, it was released in other territories, going top five in Ireland, top ten in Australia and New Zealand, top 20 in Germany, Holland, Poland and Norway. It was released in the U.S. on 6 April 2004, where it went top twenty in the Billboard dance chart.

In 2005, they collaborated with mashup artists Trick Babies (Si Edwards and Shaun Lever) who had previously built up a name making bootlegs for Galaxy FM and MTV to produce a cover version of Annie Lennox's "Little Bird", eventually being issued as a 12" single only.

Retaining the collaboration with Trick Babies, a remake of "You Get What You Give" sampling The New Radicals was issued. eventually charting at number 30 but with a fresh vocal from Rachel McFarlane.

In 2008, LMC covered Marvin Gaye's "I Heard It Through the Grapevine".

== Discography ==
=== Singles ===
List of singles, with selected chart positions
Title	Year	Peak chart positions		Certifications
Title	Year	UK	AUS	Certifications
"Everything U Need" (promo)	2002	—	—	
"Take Me to the Clouds Above" (vs. U2)	2004	1	7	BPI: Platinum; ARIA: Gold
"Little Bird" (AATW promo) (vs. Trick Babies)	2005	—	—	
"Don't Let Go" (vs. New Radicals)	2005	—	—	
"You Get What You Give" (featuring Rachel McFarlane / vs. New Radicals)	2006	30	60	
"GrapeVine" (promo) (vs. Marvin Gaye)	2007	—	—	
"Te Amo"	2019	—	—	

=== Remixes and productions ===
- "You Get What You Give" - New Radicals (2006)
- "Breathe" - Erasure (2005)
- "Party for Two" - Shania Twain (2004)
- "Oh L'amour" - Erasure (2003)
- "Alone" - Lasgo (2002)
- "Relax" - Frankie Goes to Hollywood (2009)
- "I Could Fall in Love with You" - Erasure (2008)
- "Surrender" - Lasgo (2004)
- "Pray" - Lasgo (2003)
- "So Under Pressure" - Dannii Minogue (2006)
- "My Feelings for You" - Avicii & Sebastien Drums (2010)
- "Kill It in the Name" - Jamelia (2011)
- "Still Crying" - NightCrawlers featuring Taio Cruz (2011)
- "Therese" - Put Em High (2009)
- "This Time I Know It's for Real" - Kelly Llorenna (2004)
- "Lover" - Rachel MacFarlane (2005)
- "You Never Know" - Morjac featuring Marly (2005)
- "Be Without You" - Wi-Fi featuring Melanie M (2009)
- "Addicted to Love" - Robert Palmer (2003)
- "Seek Bromance" - XNRG featuring Francesca Swarbrick (2010)
- "Louder (Put Your Hands Up)" - Chris Willis (2011)
- "Don't Let Me Be Misunderstood" - Verde featuring Francesca Swarbrick (2011)
- "If You Were Mine" - Alex K (2009)
- "Last Night" - Wi-Fi featuring Siobhan (2008)
- "You and Me" - Blue Ray featuring Jimmy Somerville (2009)
- "Tracy" - DJ Ironic (2010)
