= Melba (1978 album) =

Studio album by Melba Moore
- Released: September 29, 1978
- Recorded: 1978
- Studio: Sigma Sound, Philadelphia & New York City
- Genre: Soul, disco
- Label: Epic
- Producer: Gene McFadden, John Whitehead Jerry Cohen

Melba Moore chronology
A Portrait of Melba (1977)	Melba (1978)	Burn (1979)

Professional ratings
Review scores
Source	Rating
Allmusic	3.5/5 stars

Melba is the eighth album by singer Melba Moore, released in 1978.

== Overview ==
Between 1975 and 1977, Moore had recorded four albums for Buddah Records, the last three of which had been disco-oriented with the title cut of her 1976 album This Is It providing Moore with her first glimmer of recording success. Moore's fourth album for Buddah, the 1977 release A Portrait of Melba, helmed by the virtuoso Philly soul production/songwriting team of McFadden & Whitehead - i.e. Gene McFadden and John Whitehead - had been a commercial failure which ended Moore's tenure with Buddah. However Moore was expediently signed to Epic Records who assigned McFadden & Whitehead to again oversee Moore's recording sessions, with Moore's Epic debut album: Melba, recorded at Sigma Sound Studios and released in September 1978.

The album's lead single: "You Stepped Into My Life", ranked as high as #5 on the Billboard ranking of top disco songs which success translated into Moore's strongest showing on Billboard's Hot 100 and R&B charts with respective peaks of #47 and #17: Moore would have number of higher ranked R&B chart singles during the 1980s but "You Stepped Into My Life" would remain her final Hot 100 chart single. The Melba album itself would be afforded a Billboard 200 peak of #114: its second single: the McFadden & Whitehead original "Pick Me Up I'll Dance" was a moderate club hit.

Despite the comparative success of the Melba album, Moore's followup album: Burn (1979), helmed by Pete Bellotte, showed a radical and commercially unsuccessful shift toward harder-edged dance music. Moore's musical focus subsequently shifted back to a softer sound, and throughout the 1980's Moore scored a handful of R&B hits without becoming a major star. McFadden & Whitehead would contribute as songwriters and/or producers to Moore's albums: Closer (1980) and What a Woman Needs (1981), and to the singer's 1988 album I'm in Love: also Gene McFadden would produce and co-write Moore's two #1 R&B hits: "Falling" and (with Freddie Jackson) "A Little Bit More" both from Moore's 1986 album A Lot of Love.

== Track listing ==
1. "You Stepped Into My Life" (Barry Gibb, Robin Gibb, Maurice Gibb)
2. "There's No Other Like You" (Gene McFadden, John Whitehead, Victor Carstarphen)
3. "It's Hard Not to Like You" (Frankie Smith, Harold Preston, Gene McFadden, John Whitehead)
4. "Together Forever" (Melba Moore)
5. "Pick Me Up, I'll Dance" (Gene McFadden, John Whitehead, Ronald Rose)
6. "Happy" (Gene McFadden, John Whitehead, Jerry Cohen)
7. "I Promise to Love You" (Gene McFadden, John Whitehead, Jerry Cohen)
8. "Where Did You Ever Go" (Dexter Wansel)

== Charts ==
Chart (1978)	Peak position
Billboard Top LPs & Tape	114
Billboard Top Soul LPs	35

=== Singles ===
Year	Single	Chart positions		
Year	Single	US	US R&B	US Dance
1978	"You Stepped Into My Life"	47 (1979)	17	5
1979	"Pick Me Up, I'll Dance"	—	85	22
