= Melba =

Melba may refer to:

== People ==
- Dame Nellie Melba (1861–1931), Australian soprano opera singer
- Melba Montgomery (1938–2025), American country singer-songwriter
- Melba Moore (born 1945), American R&B singer and actress
- Melba Roy Mouton (1929–1990), American NASA scientist

== Arts and entertainment ==
- Melba (1976 album), by Melba Moore
- Melba (1978 album), by Melba Moore
- Melba (film), a 1953 musical biopic about Nellie Melba
- Melba (miniseries), a 1988 Australian miniseries about Nellie Melba
- Melba (radio serial), 1946–7 musical drama about Nellie Melba
- Melba (TV series), a TV series starring Melba Moore
- Melba, a 2009 album by The Nope (Moka Only and Psy)

== Places ==
- Melba, Australian Capital Territory, a suburb of Canberra, Australia
- Melba, Idaho, a small town in the United States
- Melba Gully State Park, an area of the Otway Ranges, Australia

== Other uses ==
- Melba (apple)
- Melba (beetle), a genus of insects in the family Staphylinidae
- Melba (restaurant), Michelin-recommended French restaurant in Quebec City
- The Melba, Sydney, former name of a theatre in Sydney, a.k.a. Alhambra Music Hall
- Melba, the name of a monster from the show Ultraman Tiga
- Melba Opera Trust, formed after the closure of Melba Memorial Conservatorium of Music, Melbourne, Australia

== See also ==
- Peach Melba, a dessert
- Melba toast, a dry, thin, crisp toast often served with soup
