= Late Night Tales: Midlake =

Compilation album by Midlake
- Released: March 28, 2011
- Genre: Folk rock, indie rock
- Length: 1:11:25
- Label: Night Time Stories
- Compiler: Midlake

Midlake chronology
The Courage of Others (2010)	Late Night Tales: Midlake (2011)	Antiphon (2013)

Late Night Tales chronology
Late Night Tales: The Cinematic Orchestra (2010)	Late Night Tales: Midlake (2011)	Late Night Tales: Trentemøller (2011)

Late Night Tales: Midlake is a mix album compiled by folk rock band Midlake and released through Late Night Stories on March 28, 2011. The album is the 23rd in the Late Night Tales series.

Midlake's Late Night Tales selection '"tracks the fringes where disparate strains of art-rock, folk and folk-rock rub up against each other...an intriguing blend of old and new, with antique obscurities by such as Jimmie Spheeris and Bob Carpenter alongside more recent cuts from the likes of Espers and Björk." Their compilation features tracks from artists such as Fairport Convention, Steeleye Span, Björk, Espers, and Vashti Bunyan. It also features an exclusive in Midlake's cover of the Black Sabbath song "Am I Going Insane" off their 1975 album Sabotage.

== Track listing ==
No.	Title	Artist(s)	Length
1.	"Silent Passage"	Bob Carpenter	2:47
2.	"Time's the Thief"	Bread, Love and Dreams	4:40
3.	"Genesis Hall"	Fairport Convention	3:35
4.	"The Blacksmith"	Steeleye Span	3:39
5.	"Warmth of Your Eyes"	Lazarus	3:03
6.	"Caroline"	Espers	3:23
7.	"Esmaria"	Jimmy Spheeris	5:44
8.	"Copenhagen"	Scott Walker	2:17
9.	"Am I Going Insane (Black Sabbath Cover)"	Midlake	6:04
10.	"Unravel"	Björk	3:17
11.	"Silver Soul"	Beach House	4:48
12.	"Carnival"	Sandy Denny	5:46
13.	"Christine's Tune"	The Flying Burrito Brothers	3:01
14.	"Happiness & Tears"	Jan Duindam	3:38
15.	"Coldest Night of the Year"	Twice as Much and Vashti Bunyan	3:27
16.	"Crucify Your Mind"	Sixto Rodriguez	2:29
17.	"These Days"	Nico	3:30
18.	"Whispering Pines"	The Band	3:55
19.	"The Happy Detective Pt. 4"	Will Self	2:33
