= Angelo Badalamenti discography =

This is the discography of Angelo Badalamenti, an American film score composer. Badalamenti composed scores for dozens of films, television shows, and video games. He won one Grammy Award, a Lifetime Achievement Award at the World Soundtrack Awards, and the American Society of Composers, Authors and Publishers Henry Mancini Award.

== Soundtracks ==
Year	Title	Director	Studio / Publisher	Notes
1973	Gordon's War	Ossie Davis	20th Century Fox	Credited as Andy Badale
1974	Law and Disorder	Ivan Passer	Columbia Pictures	Credited as Andy Badale
1977	Special Treat: "It's a Brand New World"	Al Elias	NBC	Credited as Andy Badale
1986	Blue Velvet	David Lynch	DEG	
1987	A Nightmare on Elm Street 3: Dream Warriors	Chuck Russell	New Line Cinema	
1987	Tough Guys Don't Dance	Norman Mailer	American Zoetrope	
1987	Weeds	John D. Hancock	DEG	
1989	Cousins	Joel Schumacher	Paramount Pictures	
1989	National Lampoon's Christmas Vacation	Jeremiah Chechik	Warner Bros.	No official score or soundtrack was released for purchase.
1989	Wait Until Spring, Bandini	Dominique Deruddere	American Zoetrope	
1990	The Comfort of Strangers	Paul Schrader	Skouras Pictures	
1990	Twin Peaks	Various	Spelling Television	Television series
1990	Wild at Heart	David Lynch	The Samuel Goldwyn Company	
1992	Twin Peaks: Fire Walk with Me	David Lynch	New Line Cinema	
1993	Naked in New York	Daniel Algrant	Fine Line Features	
1994	Inside the Actors Studio		Bravo	Television series
1994	Witch Hunt	Paul Schrader	HBO	
1995	The City of Lost Children	Marc Caro, Jean-Pierre Jeunet	Sony Pictures Classics	
1996	Profiler		NBC	Television series, theme song only
1997	The Blood Oranges	Philip Haas	Trimark Pictures	
1997	The Last Don	Graeme Clifford	CBS	Television miniseries, theme song only
1997	Lost Highway	David Lynch	October Films	
1999	Arlington Road	Mark Pellington	Screen Gems	
1999	Forever Mine	Paul Schrader	J&M Entertainment	
1999	Holy Smoke!	Jane Campion	Miramax Films	
1999	The Straight Story	David Lynch	Walt Disney Pictures	
2000	A Piece of Eden	John D. Hancock	Film	
2000	The Beach	Danny Boyle	20th Century Fox	
2001	Mulholland Drive	David Lynch	Universal Pictures	Also actor
2001	Cet amour-là	Josée Dayan	Arte France Cinéma, Canal+, Studio Images 7	
2002	The Adversary	Nicole Garcia	StudioCanal	
2002	Auto Focus	Paul Schrader	Sony Pictures Classics	
2002	Cabin Fever	Eli Roth	Lions Gate Entertainment	with Nathan Barr
2002	Secretary	Steven Shainberg	Lions Gate Entertainment	
2002	Suspended Animation	John D. Hancock	Film Acres Productions	
2002	Rabbits	David Lynch		Web series
2003	Resistance	Todd Komarnicki	First Floor Features	
2004	Before the Fall	Dennis Gansel	Constantin Film	
2004	Evilenko	David Grieco	Minus Habens Records	
2004	A Very Long Engagement	Jean-Pierre Jeunet	Warner Independent Pictures	
2005	Dark Water	Walter Salles	Buena Vista Pictures	
2005	Dominion: Prequel to the Exorcist	Paul Schrader	Warner Bros.	
2005	Fahrenheit	David Cage	Atari	Video game
2006	The Wicker Man	Neil LaBute	Warner Bros.	
2008	The Edge of Love	John Maybury	Capitol Films	
2009	44 Inch Chest	Malcolm Venville	Momentum Pictures	
2010	A Woman	Giada Colagrande	Bidou Pictures	
2011	A Butterfly Kiss	Karine Silla Pérez	EuropaCorp	
2012	A Late Quartet	Yaron Zilberman	Entertainment One	
2013	Stalingrad	Fedor Bondarchuk	Columbia Pictures	
2015	Gold Coast	Daniel Dencik	Haslund / Dencik Entertainment Aps	
2017	Twin Peaks	David Lynch	Showtime	Television series
2018	Between Worlds	Maria Pulera	Lions Gate Entertainment	Main theme only

== Other works ==
All individual songs listed are first recordings. When first version is unknown, both are. Notable cover versions are listed under notes.
For much of his early work, Badalamenti was credited as "Andy Badale" or "Andy Badalele"

Year	Title	Artist	Notes
1962	Old Spice	Clyde and The Bird Watchers	first known recorded work
1964	I Went By Our House Today	Polly Perkins	
1964	Escapade	Wynton Kelley Trio	from It's All Right!
1965	Today Will Be Yesterday Tomorrow	Karl Denver	B-Side to Cry A Little Sometimes
1966	I Hold No Grudge	Nina Simone	from High Priestess of Soul
1966	He Ain't Comin' Home No More	Nina Simone	from High Priestess of Soul
1966	Sugar Me Sweet	Al Caiola	B-side to Duel At Diablo
1966	Something On My Mind	Bobbi Martin	B-side to Don't Take It Out On Me
1966	She's Got A Heart	Roy Hamilton	B-side to The Impossible Dream
1966	Visa To The Stars	Perrey-Kingsley	from The In Sound From Way Out!
1967	My Love Is Gone From Me	Ed Ames	b-side to Who Will Answer?
1967	I Want To Love You For What You Are	Ronnie Dove	
1967	Dancin' Out of My Heart	Ronnie Dove	
1967	I Had To Know My Way Around	Della Reese	From the album Della On Strings Of Blue
1967	Pioneers of The Stars	Perrey-Kingsley	from Kaleidoscopic Vibrations
1967	But Only Sometimes	Nancy Wilson	
1968	Face It Girl, It's Over	Nancy Wilson	from Easy. Covered by George Benson the same year (as Face it Boy, It's Over) on Shape of Things to Come, and in 1969 by The Delfonics on Sound of Sexy Soul.
1968	Pendant Que Nous Chantons	Enrico Macias	
1968	I Had To Know My Way Around	Della Reese	
1968	Livin' For Your Lovin'	Ronnie Dove	
1968	I've Been Here All The Time	Irene Reid	From the album I've Been Here All The Time...
1969	Fa-Fa-Fa (Live For Today)	Shirley Bassey	
1969	Passport To The Future	Jean-Jacques Perrey	
1969	Mary France	Jean-Jacques Perrey	
1969	We're Living To Give (To Give To Each Other)	Ruby Winters	Covered by Melba Moore in 1970 on I Got Love
1969	That Love That A Woman Should Give To A Man	Spanky Wilson	from the album Doin' It
1969	World of No Return	Patti Drew	
1969	Thank You Love	Dee Dee Warwick	
1969	Artificial Light (Of All The Living Lies)	Bread, Love and Dreams	from the album Bread, Love and Dreams; Originally recorded by Sagittarius in 1968, but unreleased until the 1997 re-issue of Present Tense
1970	Look What You're Doing To The Man	Melba Moore	
1970	I Love Making Love To You	Melba Moore	from I Got Love
1970	Moog Indigo	Jean-Jacques Perrey	five tracks written or co-written by Badalamenti as "Andy Badale"
1970	Sing Away The World	Ed Ames	
1973	Child of Tomorrow	Barbara Mason	also appears on the Gordon's War soundtrack
1973	I Miss You Gordon	Barbara Mason	from the album Lady Love
1973	Come On And Dream Some Paradise	The New Birth	from the album It's Been a Long Time, also appears on the Gordon's War soundtrack
1973	Hot Wheels b/w Harlem Dreams	Badder Than Evil	Badalamenti and frequent collaborator Al Elias working under a pseudonym. Both songs also appear on the Gordon's War soundtrack
1974	Les Trois Pierres Blanches	Jean-Jacques Perrey	from the album Moog Mig Mag Moog
1975	Man Was Made To Love Woman	Bobbi Martin	
1976	How Do You Like Them Apples b/w Ain't No Room In My Bed	The Bagdads	single released by Badalamenti and "Badder Than Evil" collaborator Al Elias under a new band name
1977	Let Me Down Easy	Peggy Sue	from the album I Just Came In Here (To Let A Little Hurt Out)
1978	Another Spring	Margret RoadKnight	from the album Ice.
1979	Nashville Beer Garden	The Andy Badale Orchestra	Polka album, also released under the name Andy Badale and The Beer Garden Band
1981	The Story About Ping	Scholastic Records	musical setting of the children's book by Marjorie Flack, read by Alice Playten.
1984	Bony-Legs	Scholastic Records	musical setting of the story by Joanna Cole, read by Jean Richard
1995	A Secret Life	Marianne Faithfull	Collaboration with Marianne Faithfull
1996	Booth and the Bad Angel	Booth and the Bad Angel	Collaboration with Tim Booth of James
2018	Thought Gang	Thought Gang	Collaboration with David Lynch on Sacred Bones Records

== Awards ==
- 1990 – Grammy Award for Best Pop Instrumental Performance: "Twin Peaks Theme"
- 2008 – World Soundtrack Awards: Lifetime Achievement Award
- 2011 – American Society of Composers, Authors and Publishers: Henry Mancini Award
