= A Portrait of Melba =

Studio album by Melba Moore
- Released: November 6, 1977
- Recorded: 1977
- Label: Buddah
- Producer: Gene McFadden, John Whitehead, Victor Carstarphen

Melba Moore chronology
Melba (1976)	A Portrait of Melba (1977)	Melba (1978)

Professional ratings
Review scores
Source	Rating
Allmusic	3/5 stars

A Portrait of Melba is the seventh album by singer Melba Moore, released in 1977.

== Background ==
Moore's fourth album for Buddah Records, A Portrait of Melba - like Moore's two 1976 Van McCoy-produced albums - primarily aimed the singer at the disco market where Moore had had her first glimmer of success as a recording artist with the 1976 single "This Is It". A Portrait of Melba was produced by the virtuoso Philly soul duo McFadden & Whitehead - their first full album production - and was Moore's first album to be distributed by Arista Records.

== Reception ==
The one single issued from the album: "Standing Right Here" in December 1977, failed to become a significant hit, stalling at #69 on the R&B chart in Billboard and #53 on that magazine's Dance Music/Club Play Singles, and A Portrait of Melba became Moore's first Buddah album release to fall short of both the Billboard 200 and the magazine's ranking of bestselling R&B oriented albums. However Moore would again collaborate with McFadden and Whitehead on her next album: Melba, which would become her most successful recording venture.

== Track listing ==
All tracks composed by Gene McFadden, John Whitehead and Victor Carstarphen; except where indicated

1. "You Are My River" (Carlos Santana, Leon Patillo)
2. "Promised Land" (Leon Huff, Gene McFadden, John Whitehead, Victor Carstarphen)
3. "I Don't Know No One Else to Turn To"
4. "Standing Right Here"
5. "Just Another Link"
6. "Living Free"
7. "Is This the End" (Douglas Brown, Tom Wallington, William Bloom)
8. "Love and I Aren't Strangers Anymore"
