= Boogie-woogie (disambiguation) =

Boogie-woogie is a piano-based music style.

Boogie-woogie may also refer to:

- Boogie-woogie (dance), a swing dance
- "Boogie Woogie" (song), a 1995 song by EuroGroove and Dannii Minogue
- Boogie Woogie (album), a 1941 compilation album released by Columbia Records
- Boogie Woogie (film), a 2009 comedy film
- Boogie Woogie (Indian TV series), a dance-based show broadcast in India
- Boogie Oogie, a Brazilian telenovela produced by Rede Globo in 2014
- Broadway Boogie Woogie, a 1943 painting by Piet Mondrian
- Boogie Woogie Red (1925–1992), American blues musician
- "Boogie Oogie Oogie", a 1978 song by A Taste of Honey
- Boogie Woogie (Japanese TV series), a 2023 morning television drama from Japanese broadcaster NHK

== See also ==
- Oogie Boogie, a character from the animated film The Nightmare Before Christmas
