= BNQT =

Musical group

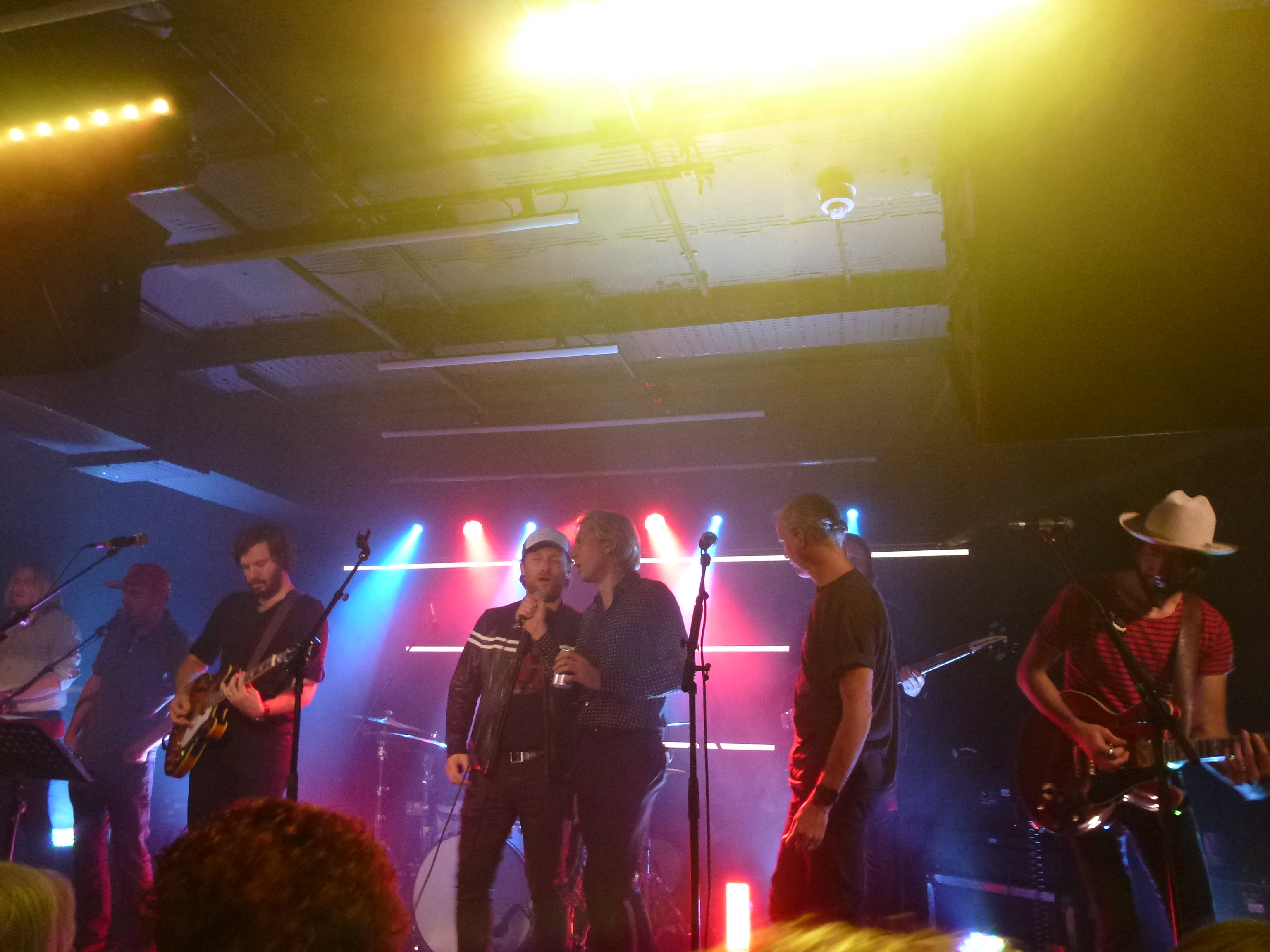
- BNQT joined on stage by Chris Stills at The Borderline, London in 2017

Background information
- Genres: Indie rock
- Years active: 2015–present
- Labels: Dualtone; Bella Union
- Members: Fran Healy; Alex Kapranos; Eric Pulido; Ben Bridwell; Jason Lytle; Jesse Chandler; Joey McClellan; McKenzie Smith
- Website: bnqtlivenow.bandcamp.com

BNQT (/ˈbæŋkwɪt/ "banquet") is an indie super-group featuring Fran Healy (Travis), Alex Kapranos (Franz Ferdinand), Eric Pulido (Midlake), Ben Bridwell (Band of Horses) and Jason Lytle (Grandaddy), backed by other members of Midlake: Jesse Chandler, Joey McClellan and McKenzie Smith.

== Background ==
The concept came to Pulido whilst he was touring Midlake’s 2013 album Antiphon. Pulido wanted to gather a number of contrasting yet complementary artists he had befriended or shared the stage with and establish an environment in which they could collaborate. Pulido said "That’s what art is about for me, creating with other people that you love and appreciate." Due to members being spread around the world, recordings were either done through travel to Denton, Texas or remotely over the internet. Pulido said that he envisioned the project as a "poor man's Traveling Wilburys."

Pulido initially approached John Grant, the lead singer from The Czars about the project. Grant proved unavailable for the recording of the band's debut studio album, Volume 1, but has however expressed interest in involvement in the second BNQT album, to be titled Volume 2.

== Volume 1 (2015–2018) ==
The BNQT debut album Volume 1 was recorded and self-produced by the band members at Redwood Studios in Denton, Texas and released on 28 April 2017. Each of the five vocalists wrote and sang on two songs each for the album. It received a mainly positive reaction from music critics. On Metacritic, it received an average critic score of 78, based on 14 reviews, indicating "generally favourable reviews".

BNQT's tour to promote the debut album commenced in Dallas on 23 October 2017, before visiting the UK, the Netherlands, Ireland and France, where the band played at the Café de la Danse theatre in Paris.

== Discography ==
List of studio albums, with selected chart positions
Title	Album details	Peak chart positions
Title	Album details	US Independent Albums
Volume 1	Released: 28 April 2017; Label: Dualtone, Bella Union; Format: CD, LP, download	42
