= Love's Comin' at Ya =

Single by Melba Moore

from the album The Other Side of the Rainbow
- Released: 1982
- Recorded: 1982
- Genre: Funk • post-disco
- Length: 3:56 (single version); 5:45 (album & 12" version)
- Label: EMI America, Capitol
- Songwriter: Paul Lawrence Jones III
- Producers: Paul Lawrence Jones III, Kashif, Morrie Brown

Melba Moore singles chronology
"Take My Love" (1981)	"Love's Comin' at Ya" (1982)	"Mind Up Tonight" (1983)

"Love's Comin' at Ya" is a song recorded and released by American singer Melba Moore in 1982. Originally released on EMI America, it was also the first single released off her Capitol Records debut album, The Other Side of the Rainbow.

== Chart performance ==
Served as a follow-up to her Kashif-produced hit, "Take My Love", "Love's Comin' At Ya" became an even bigger hit, produced by Kashif and Paul Lawrence Jones III, who also wrote the song, reaching No. 5 on the R&B chart, also reaching No. 2 on the Hot Dance Singles chart, and also became a hit overseas reaching number-fifteen in the United Kingdom, bringing the singer her best charted single in the country since "This Is It" seven years earlier. The song didn't chart on the Billboard Hot 100.

== Samples ==
The song has been sampled in several recordings over the years, most notably by Bok Bok and singer Kelela on the song "Melba's Call", in which the song was heavily sped up and pitched. Other acts that have sampled the song include Tiger & Woods ("Love in Cambodgia"), Soul Avengerz ("Comin' at Ya"), Demarkus Lewis ("In Comes Love") and Hustlers Convention ("Clue You In").

== Personnel ==
- Lead vocals: Melba Moore
- Background vocals: Melba Moore, Alyson Williams, B.J. Nelson, Fonzi Thornton, Lillo Thomas, Freddie Jackson and Phillip Ballou
- Drums: Leslie Ming
- Guitar: Ira Siegel
- Other instrumentation: Paul Lawrence Jones III and Kashif

== Charts ==
Chart (1982)	Peak position
US Hot Black Singles	5
US Hot Dance Club Songs	2
UK Singles Chart	15
