= The Other Side of the Rainbow =

The Other Side of the Rainbow may refer to:

- The Other Side of the Rainbow (book), a 2001 autobiography by Máire Brennan (Moya Brennan)
- The Other Side of the Rainbow (album), a 1992 album by Melba Moore
