= Volume 1 (BNQT album) =

Studio album by BNQT
- Released: 28 April 2017
- Studios: Redwood Studios; (Denton, Texas)
- Genres: Indie rock; soft rock; glam rock
- Length: 42:39
- Labels: Dualtone; Bella Union
- Producer: BNQT

Volume 1 is the debut studio album by indie super-group BNQT, led by Eric Pulido (Midlake) with Ben Bridwell (Band of Horses), Alex Kapranos (Franz Ferdinand), Fran Healy (Travis) and Jason Lytle (Grandaddy), backed by the other members of Midlake. Each member wrote and sang on two tracks each. It was released on 28 April 2017.

== Background ==
The concept came to Pulido whilst he was touring Midlake’s 2013 album Antiphon. Pulido wanted to gather a number of contrasting yet complementary artists he’d befriended or shared the stage with and establish an environment in which they could collaborate. Pulido said “That’s what art is about for me, creating with other people that you love and appreciate.”

Due to members being spread around the world, recordings were either done through travel to Denton or remotely over the internet.

== Critical reception ==
Professional ratings
Aggregate scores
Source	Rating
Metacritic	78/100
Review scores
Source	Rating
AllMusic	4/5 stars
Clash Music	4/5 stars
DIY	3/5 stars
Paste	6.8/10
Pitchfork	5.8/10
The Guardian	5/5 stars
The Independent	4/5 stars
The Skinny	2/5 stars

Volume 1 received positive reviews from critics. On Metacritic, the album received an average critic score of 78, based on 14 reviews, indicating "generally favourable reviews". Tim Sendra of Allmusic described it as a "remarkably coherent and listenable album that goes down very smooth, but not without the occasional moment of real emotion or foot-tapping fun". In a five-star review for the Guardian, Jon Dennis praised each member, writing they "All provide great tunes – they write and sing two each – and they entertain rather than indulge in introspection".

In a less favourable review for Pitchfork, Philip Cosores criticises the album for being like "hapless projects that are more fun for the artists involved than for the listeners". Finbarr Bermingham of The Skinny was also critical, writing "In short, this is the least inventive product you could have expected from a bunch of varyingly inventive songwriters. Which is to say, it’s not much good at all."

== Track listing ==
No.	Title	Writer(s)	Length
1.	"Restart"	Eric Pulido - Jesse Chandler - Joey McClellan - McKenzie Smith	4:26
2.	"Unlikely Force"	Ben Bridwell	4:06
3.	"100 Million Miles"	Jason Lytle	5:33
4.	"Mind of a Man"	Fran Healy	3:55
5.	"Hey Banana"	Alex Kapranos	3:50
6.	"Real Love"	Pulido - Chandler - McClellan - Smith	3:24
7.	"Failing at Feeling"	Lytle	4:28
8.	"L.A on My Mind"	Healy	3:42
9.	"Tara"	Bridwell	4:12
10.	"Fighting the World"	Kapranos	4:58
Total length:			42:39

== Charts ==
Chart (2017)	Peak position
US Independent Albums (Billboard)	42
US Heatseekers Albums (Billboard)	17
