= Peach Melba (album) =

Studio album by Melba Moore
- Released: June 10, 1975
- Recorded: 1975
- Label: Buddah
- Producer: Eugene McDaniels

Melba Moore chronology
Melba Moore Live! (1972)	Peach Melba (1975)	This Is It (1976)

Professional ratings
Review scores
Source	Rating
Allmusic	2/5 stars

Peach Melba is the fourth album by singer Melba Moore, released in 1975: her Buddah Records debut, Peach Melba was Moore's first studio album since 1971 (the singer's third album had been the 1972 concert album Melba Moore Live!). Moore would credit her husband/manager Charles Huggins, whom she married in September 1974, with getting her signed to Buddah.

== Reception ==
What little success Moore's Buddah tenure would afford her would be focused on her 1976 album release This Is It which produced her first two major R&B chart hits: "This Is It" and "Lean On Me", the former also being the first of Moore's two singles to rank in the Billboard Hot 100. However the Peach Melba album is notable among Prince fans as his former guitarist Wendy Melvoin along with her twin sister Susannah provide backing vocals on Moore's rendition of "Sunshine Superman".

== Track listing ==
1. "Must Be Dues" (Dennis Collins Johnson, Eugene McDaniels)
2. "Get Into My Mind" (Eugene McDaniels, Gary King, Hank Cicalo, Morgan Ames)
3. "If You Can Believe" (Ralph MacDonald, William Salter)
4. "Sunshine Superman" (Donovan Leitch)
5. "My Soul is Satisfied" (Mary McCreary)
6. "I Am His Lady" (Morgan Ames)
7. "Green Birds Fly" (Peter Yarrow, Philip Namanworth)
8. "Natural Part of Everything" (Dennis Collins Johnson, Eugene McDaniels)
9. "Love Can Be Good to You" (Rachel Perry)
10. "A Million Years Before this Time" (Eugene McDaniels)
11. "If I Lose" (Eugene McDaniels)
