= The Trials of Van Occupanther =

Studio album by Midlake
- Released: July 25, 2006
- Recorded: 2005–06
- Genre: Soft rock; country rock
- Length: 44:51
- Label: Bella Union
- Producer: Tim Smith; Midlake

Midlake chronology
Balloon Maker (2005)	The Trials of Van Occupanther (2006)	The Courage of Others (2010)

Professional ratings
Aggregate scores
Source	Rating
Metacritic	78/100
Review scores
Source	Rating
AllMusic	4/5 stars
The A.V. Club	A−
Entertainment Weekly	B+
The Guardian	4/5 stars
Mojo	4/5 stars
MSN Music (Consumer Guide)	C
NME	8/10
Pitchfork	6.8/10
Q	3/5 stars
Uncut	4/5 stars

The Trials of Van Occupanther is the second studio album by American rock band Midlake. It was released on July 25, 2006, on Bella Union.

It was reissued on its 10th anniversary in 2016 with new cover art, photographs, and two unreleased songs.

The first track on the album, "Roscoe", was released as a single and is one of the band's signature songs. It was listed as number 90 in Rolling Stone magazine's 100 Greatest Songs of the 2000s.

== Track listings ==
All tracks are written by Tim Smith.

No.	Title	Length
1.	"Roscoe"	4:49
2.	"Bandits"	4:04
3.	"Head Home"	5:45
4.	"Van Occupanther"	3:15
5.	"Young Bride"	4:56
6.	"Branches"	5:02
7.	"In This Camp"	5:46
8.	"We Gathered in Spring"	3:33
9.	"It Covers the Hillsides"	3:14
10.	"Chasing After Deer"	2:42
11.	"You Never Arrived"	1:45

EU edition bonus tracks
No.	Title	Length
12.	"Mornings Will be Kind"
13.	"Marion"
14.	"It Covers The Hillsides" (alt version)
15.	"Paper Gown"

Australasian edition bonus CD
No.	Title	Year	Length
1.	"Mornings Will Be Kind"	2005	2:46
2.	"Paper Gown"	2001	4:30
3.	"It Covers The Hillsides" (alt version)	2006	3:08
4.	"Excited But Not Enough"	2001	4:19
5.	"Golden Hour"	2001	3:41

10th anniversary bonus tracks
No.	Title	Length
12.	"The Fairest Way"	2:59
13.	"Festival"	5:17

== Personnel ==
- Tim Smith – vocals, piano, keyboard, acoustic guitar, electric guitar, flute
- Eric Pulido – electric guitar, acoustic guitar, 12-string acoustic guitar, keyboards, backing vocals
- Eric Nichelson – keyboards, piano, acoustic guitar, 12-string acoustic guitar, electric guitar
- Paul Alexander – bass, double bass, electric guitar, keyboards, piano, bassoon
- McKenzie Smith – drums, percussion

=== Additional musicians ===
- Linda Salisbury – French horn on "Branches" and "Van Occupanther"
- Josh Ello – violin on "Young Bride"

== Production notes ==
- Songs and lyrics by Tim Smith
- Produced by Tim Smith and Midlake
- Engineered and mixed by Paul Alexander and Midlake
- Mastered by Alan Douches at West West Side Music
- Photos by Tim Smith
- Design and layout by Tim Carter and Midlake
- Recorded and mixed in Denton, TX
