= Burn (Melba Moore album) =

Studio album by Melba Moore
- Released: September 21, 1979
- Recorded: 1979
- Studio: Record Plant, New York City
- Genre: Disco
- Label: Epic
- Producer: Pete Bellotte

Melba Moore chronology
Melba (1978)	Burn (1979)	Closer (1980)

Burn is the ninth album by singer Melba Moore, released in 1979.

== Critical reception ==
Professional ratings
Review scores
Source	Rating
Bay State Banner	C

The Bay State Banner wrote that "Moore still doesn't comprehend that in disco, a singer takes a crowd to peak by building up passion rather than changing constantly (as in a conversation) from soft to loud."

== Track listing ==
1. "Burn" (Melba Moore, Pete Bellotte)
2. "Hot and Tasty" (Bruce Hawes, Melba Moore, Mikki Farrow)
3. "If You Believe in Love" (Melba Moore, Pete Bellotte)
4. "Night People" (Bruce Hawes, Melba Moore, Mikki Farrow)
5. "I Don't Wanna Lose Your Love" (Bruce Hawes, Melba Moore, Mikki Farrow)
6. "Can't Give it Up" (Bruce Hawes, Melba Moore, Mikki Farrow)
7. "Miss Thing" (Bruce Hawes, Melba Moore, Mikki Farrow)
8. "Need Love" (Bruce Hawes, Melba Moore, Mikki Farrow)
