= Eurogroove =

Eurodance group of the 1990s

- Years active: 1994–1996
- Members: Tetsuya Komuro; Phil France; Tony King; Bozidar Ristic

Eurogroove was a Eurodance act active in the 1990s, led by Japanese producer Tetsuya Komuro, in collaboration with FKB (Phil France, Tony King and Bozidar Ristic), and fronted by British vocalists Dazz, Steve and Charles Jarman. Dazz and Steve were replaced by Sierra Wilson and Ian Burrell after the first three singles.

They were particularly successful in Japan and the United Kingdom, where they scored three top 40 hits in 1995 with "Move Your Body", "Dive to Paradise" and "It's on You (Scan Me)".

== Discography ==
=== Albums ===
- In the Groove (1996)

=== Singles ===
Japan releases

- "Move Your Body Baby" (1994)
- "Don't Keep Me Hangin' On" (1994)
- "Dive to Paradise" (feat. Silvia) (1994)
- "Rescue Me" (with Dannii Minogue) (1995) – #1 Japanese International Singles Chart
- "Boogie Woogie" (with Dannii Minogue) (1995) – #1 Japanese International Singles Chart
- "Let's Go" (1995)

UK releases

- "Move Your Body" (1995) – #29 UK
- "Dive to Paradise" (1995) – #31 UK
- "It's on You (Scan Me)" (1995) – #25 UK
- "Move Your Body" (Remix) (1996) – #44 UK
- "Rescue Me" – completely different recording than the Japanese release (1996) – #99 UK
