= Roscoe (song) =

Single by Midlake

from the album The Trials of Van Occupanther
- Released: May 2006
- Genre: Psychedelic rock; soft rock
- Length: 4:49
- Label: Bella Union
- Songwriter: Tim Smith

"Roscoe" is the lead single from Midlake's sophomore album The Trials of Van Occupanther.

== Background and recording ==
Songwriter Tim Smith incorporated elements of the M*A*S*H* theme into the tune. The Trials of Van Occupanther, for which Roscoe is the lead single, was recorded at the band's Texas studio.

== Critical reception ==
The Trials of Van Occupanther holds a 79 aggregate score on Metacritic. The A.V. Club described "Roscoe" as "the kind of song worth stopping everything for" in their positive review of the album. Paste labelled it as "forceful" and "assured" in their similarly favorable take on Van Occupanther. The Austin Chronicle praised its "delicate vocals," and Pitchfork complained that "nothing else here comes close [to Roscoe]" on the album. It was featured in Rolling Stone's "100 Best Songs of the 2000s" list and The Atlantic's "Track of the Day" segment.

Tiny Mix Tapes, in contrast, described the album as "a sterile, ineffectual effort that trades in confidence for reticence." Their review, which is the most negative recorded by Metacritic, knocked the loss of synthesizers and aggressive vocals in "Roscoe".

== In popular culture ==
The song is included in the soundtrack for 2009 film The Cry of the Owl.

== Ellie Goulding version ==
British singer-songwriter Ellie Goulding released a cover of "Roscoe" in 2009. It served as bonus material for An Introduction to Ellie Goulding, her first EP.
