= This Is the Way (Dannii Minogue song) =

Single by Dannii Minogue

from the album Get into You
- B-side: "No Secret"
- Released: 20 September 1993
- Genre: Dance-pop
- Length: 4:00
- Label: Mushroom; MCA
- Songwriters: Michael Ward; Cary Baylis; Eliot Kennedy
- Producers: Michael Ward; Eliot Kennedy

Dannii Minogue singles chronology
"This Is It" (1993)	"This Is the Way" (1993)	"Get into You" (1994)

Music video
- "This Is the Way" on YouTube

"This Is the Way" is a dance-pop song written by Eliot Kennedy, Cary Baylis and Michael Ward for Australian singer Dannii Minogue's second album, Get into You (1993). The song, produced by Kennedy and Ward, was released in September 1993 as the album's fourth single. It peaked at number 27 on the UK Singles Chart and number 45 in Australia.

== Critical reception ==
Alan Jones from Music Week wrote, "Strong bass and weedy synth strings underpin a muscular pop/dance confection that draws one of Minogue's meatier vocals." Tom Doyle from Smash Hits gave the song three out of five, describing it as "the sort of perky pop records that made Kylie famous. It's your typical hands-in-the-air house stuff in which Dannii goes "searching for love" before discovering her "true love story". You get the picture."

== Music video ==
The accompanying music video for "This Is the Way" was filmed in New Jersey and serves as a sequel to that of Minogue's previous hit, "This Is It".

=== Synopsis ===
In the video, Minogue is portrayed as a woman with a lucrative career, who is doing very well - until in a coffee shop, she sees a couple being romantic towards one another, which causes her to reminisce about her time with her boyfriend (Julian McMahon). Upon returning to work, she bumps into a similarly high-career man, causing her to drop her papers. He picks them up for her, and is amazed upon seeing her. They go out for a coffee date the next day, but when he goes too far in getting close to her, she snaps and throws coffee over him. She goes to her apartment and breaks down. When she sees a photo of her and McMahon kissing, she drastically changes out of her work outfit and packs for a trip to McMahon's Turnpike farmhouse. However, while she is packing for her trip, her coffee date from earlier knocks on the door, intending to apologise for his mistake. But Minogue is intent on rekindling her relationship with McMahon and sneaks out through the back door and through the fire escape and makes her way into her car, in which she drives off. However, as she drives, she looks to see that the man is driving in the car behind her, but she manages to evade him by driving through a tollbooth and through a highway. At Turnpike, her car breaks down and she is forced to buy a bike to ride the rest of the way to McMahon's farmhouse.

While all this is happening, McMahon is shown doing various things: painting a still life portrait, chopping wood from trees, pouring water over himself and running with his dog, all while secretly thinking about his time with Minogue. Towards the end, he sees Minogue's bike riding along while he is in his backyard. As she knocks on his door, he answers, and both look at each other tense, but he smiles and Minogue gives a relieved look. The video ends just as the couple reunite amicably.

== Track listings ==
- Australian CD and cassette single; UK CD1 (D11584; C11584; MCSTD1935)
1. "This Is the Way" (7-inch edit)
2. "This Is the Way" (12-inch version)
3. "This Is the Way" (The Cool 7-inch)
4. "This Is the Way" (Dub version)
- UK CD2 (MCSXD1935)
1. "This Is the Way" (7-inch edit)
2. "No Secret"
3. "This Is the Way" (5 Boys mix)
4. "This Is the Way" (Funk mix)

== Charts ==
Chart performance for "This Is the Way"
Chart (1993)	Peak position
Australia (ARIA)	45
Europe (Eurochart Hot 100)	96
UK Singles (OCC)	27
UK Airplay (ERA)	78
UK Dance (Music Week)	24
UK Club Chart (Music Week)	95

== Release history ==
Region	Date	Format(s)	Label(s)	Ref.
United Kingdom	20 September 1993	7-inch vinyl; CD; cassette	MCA	
Australia	8 November 1993	CD; cassette	Mushroom	
Australia	15 November 1993	12-inch vinyl	Mushroom	
