= Midlake =

American folk rock band

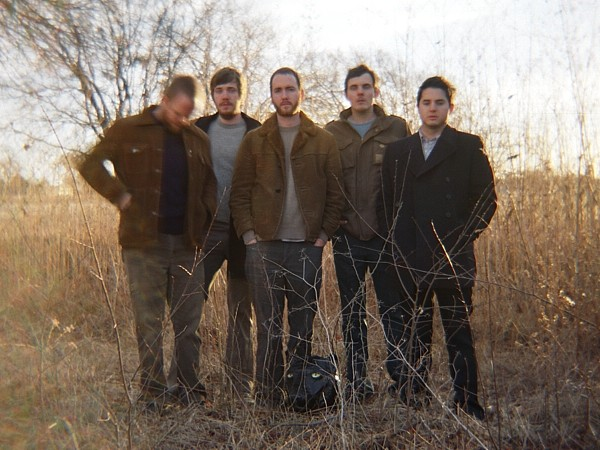

Background information
- Origin: Denton, Texas, United States
- Genres: Alternative rock; folk rock; psychedelic rock; progressive rock
- Years active: 1999–present
- Labels: Bella Union, ATO
- Members: Eric Nichelson; McKenzie Smith; Eric Pulido; Jesse Chandler; Joey McClellan; Scott Lee
- Past members: Tim Smith; Evan Jacobs; Jason Upshaw; Paul Alexander
- Website: midlakeband.com

Midlake is an American folk rock band from Denton, Texas, formed in 1999. The band consists of Eric Pulido (vocals, guitar), McKenzie Smith (drums), Eric Nichelson (keyboards, guitar), Jesse Chandler (keyboards, flute, backing vocals), Joey McClellan (guitar, backing vocals) and Scott Lee (bass).

In 2012, vocalist, guitarist and primary songwriter Tim Smith left the band during the recording of its fourth studio album. Following his departure, guitarist and backing vocalist Eric Pulido filled Smith's vacated role, and the band started afresh with its recordings, releasing Antiphon in 2013.

The band first gained popularity in Europe, signing to Bella Union Records and later playing at festivals such as Les Inrockuptibles, Wintercase, End of the Road and South by Southwest.

== History ==
=== 1999–2003: Formation and early years ===
Midlake was formed in 1999 by a group of jazz students at the University of North Texas College of Music. The original lineup consisted of Tim Smith (vocals, guitars, keyboards), McKenzie Smith (drums), Paul Alexander (bass), Eric Nichelson (guitar), and Evan Jacobs (keyboards). Their initial work – under the name "The Cornbread All-Stars" – consisted of funk/jazz explorations heavily influenced by Herbie Hancock. Later, the band began to lean more toward an indie rock sound. Tim Smith quit playing saxophone and began writing songs that were heavily influenced by bands such as Jethro Tull, Radiohead, Björk, and Grandaddy, artists who experiment, while still remaining accessible.

Speaking about the band's influences, Smith commented:

We don't want to get called a Radiohead rip-off band. I think Radiohead is a lot closer to my natural tendencies as a songwriter than a band like, um, Jethro Tull. I listen to way more Jethro Tull than I do Radiohead these days, but I could write 10 Radiohead songs before I could write one Jethro Tull song. I want to sound more like Jethro Tull, but I just can't. That's a big struggle.

In an interview with Reverb Magazine's Nick Milligan, Smith said of the band's origins:

"We were jazz musicians, but right from the get go we'd never really play jazz music. We'd play some funk stuff and then jump right into playing Led Zeppelin. For jazz musicians, rock is sort of frowned upon for how easy it is. If we had friends that knew we were playing, the best thing we could play was Herbie Hancock or Stevie Wonder. A distortion pedal seemed like a no-no. It took us a while to get away from the jazz.

=== 2004–2009: Bamnan and Slivercork and The Trials of Van Occupanther ===
Jacobs left the band and Eric Nichelson took over on keyboard. Jason Upshaw joined the band as a guitarist. Live recordings from this period, recorded at Denton's Panhandle House studio, were never released as the band felt they had moved beyond the material. Not long before the band recorded their debut EP, Milkmaid Grand Army, Upshaw was replaced on guitars by Eric Pulido, a longtime friend of drummer Smith. Their debut full-length album, 2004's Bamnan and Slivercork, was recorded at home in Denton, Texas and mastered at Abbey Road Studios. It showed a move in the direction of lo-fi psychedelic electronica, embracing influences such as Grandaddy and The Flaming Lips. The album even caught the ear of skateboarder-turned-actor Jason Lee, who produced and directed the music video for the song "Balloon Maker", and who continues to support and promote the band.

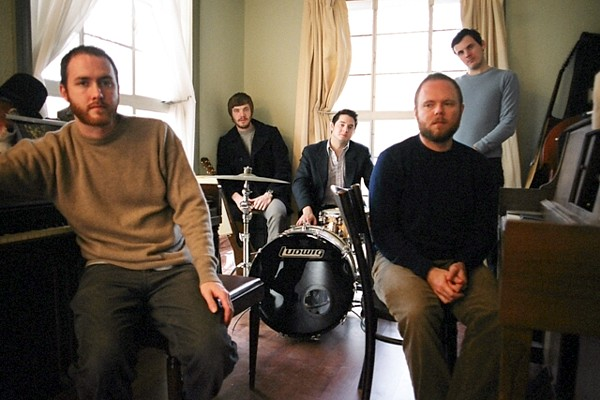
Midlake in rehearsal for the Van Occupanther album, January 2006

In 2006, after nearly a year-and-a-half of recording and re-recording, they completed their second release for Bella Union, The Trials of Van Occupanther. The album was a venture into classic-rock revivalism, with a sound reminiscent of Bob Welch-era Fleetwood Mac. The album was met with generally positive reviews. In January 2009, their song "Bandits" was featured in an episode of the FOX television drama Fringe. It was during this period that Jesse Chandler (keyboards, flute, vocals) and Joey McClellan (lead guitar and vocals) joined the band.

=== 2010–2013: The Courage of Others and the departure of Tim Smith ===
In February 2010, the band released The Courage of Others, which garnered generally good reviews, notably "album of the month" in Mojo. The album, which showcased Tim Smith's brooding baritone vocals, had a slower pace and denser musical arrangements inspired by British prog-folk acts like Pentangle, Fairport Convention, and The Incredible String Band.

In a 2010 interview with Reverb Magazine, Tim Smith told editor Nick Milligan:

I'm never satisfied with what we do, so when Occupanther came out I had changes I wanted to make. But what I disliked about the album is probably totally different than what other people might see as a problem. I might be totally focused on my voice. But I think we get a little better as we get older. We're listening to more music and getting more confident with who we are as musicians and as a band. It's a natural progression to get to The Courage of Others. Although it did take a long time and that's due to my influences and falling in love with a different style of music to what we came from.

Smith also said in the Reverb Magazine interview that his favourite song from The Courage of Others was "Small Mountain":

I think my favourite is 'Small Mountain'. Though it seems that when we've played it live, it's the weakest one – people seem to not connect with it. They'd probably rather talk to their friend than listen to it, but people don't really have the album yet. Maybe in time people will start to like that song more. It was written about when I was in college and my parents lived on the top of this hill. I'd spend time up there and wait tables at my dad's restaurant. It was just a good time for me, so it was nice to have a song that I can relate to it. I like the melody also, so that's probably my favourite.

Of The Courage of Others, Tim Smith also said:

The title track was written as a B-side for Van Occupanther so that was really old, and we never used it. We wanted to hold on to it for the next album. 'Children of the Grounds' we started playing towards the end of our touring for Van Occupanther, because I'd written that around that time and we thought we'd throw it in [the set] to see how it did. But the rest of the material was written while we were recording. There was also a lot of material that was thrown away, because I realised [the ideas] weren't good enough.

Though the group spent much of 2011 and 2012 recording at the farm in Buffalo, Texas where The Courage of Others was tracked, the recording process stalled. "We knew something was missing," guitarist Eric Pulido said. Midlake played a handful of live dates and debuted new material in 2012, including an appearance at Bella Union's 15th Anniversary End Of The Road Festival on August 31, 2012. Just a few months later, lead vocalist and songwriter Tim Smith announced he was leaving Midlake to form a new project called Harp. Rather than divide the recorded material among the two bands, Midlake abandoned the two years' worth of recordings with Smith and began again from scratch, writing and recording a new full-length album in just six months.

=== 2013–present: Antiphon, For the Sake of Bethel Woods and A Bridge to Far ===
In August 2013, Midlake announced the release date for their fourth full-length album, Antiphon, due November 5, 2013 on ATO Records in North America and November 4, 2013 on Bella Union in Europe. Guitarist Eric Pulido stepped into the role of lead vocalist on Antiphon, with backing vocals from Alexander, Chandler and McClellan. "Antiphon is the most honest representation of the band as a whole, as opposed to one person's vision that we were trying to facilitate," Pulido remarked in the album's press release, which characterizes the new music as "free-flowing in feel, concise in structure ... it's very much Midlake, but uncannily rebooted, and relaxed." In addition to the lineup change, Antiphon marks Midlake's first release on Dave Matthews' ATO Records label, also home to My Morning Jacket, Caitlin Rose, and Stars.

Midlake's fifth full-length album, For the Sake of Bethel Woods was released in March 2022 on ATO Records in North America and on Bella Union in Europe.

On August 27, 2025, the band announced their independently-released sixth album, A Bridge to Far, due November 7, 2025, as well as the immediate release of its first single "The Ghouls."

== Collaborations ==
Tim Smith is featured on the 2021 Lost Horizons double album release, "In Quiet Moments", writing lyrics, melodies and performing vocals for the song "Grey Tower" and the 2017 Lost Horizons album "Ojalá", writing lyrics and singing the song "She Led Me Away". He also appears on Chemical Brothers' 2007 album We Are the Night, contributing vocals to the track "The Pills Won't Help You Now".

In 2007 Robert Gomez and Midlake guitarist Eric Pulido recorded a version of Feliz Navidad for a "Merry Christmas from Bella Union" CD.

Midlake also co-produced, engineered and played on an album for their friend John Grant, former singer with label mates The Czars. The album, Queen of Denmark, was released in April 2010. In an interview with the UK music website The Line of Best Fit, Bella Union boss Simon Raymonde said:

I still think the Czars' singer John Grant has one of the greatest voices in music today which is why I am about to release his debut solo record, the Queen Of Denmark. In a weird coincidence, the Midlake guys all fell in love with John's voice too and invited him down to Denton this year to let them work on his record. They play all the instruments and produce. It's genius.

BNQT, led by Eric Pulido, is a collaboration between members of Midlake and Ben Bridwell (Band of Horses), Alex Kapranos (Franz Ferdinand), Fran Healy (Travis), and Jason Lytle (Grandaddy). Their first album, titled Volume 1, was released on 28 April 2017 via Dualtone/Bella Union.

== Discography ==
=== Albums ===
Year	Album	Peak positions							
Year	Album	US	AUS	BEL	FRA	NLD	NOR	SWE	UK
2004	Bamnan and Slivercork	—	—	—	—	—	—	—	—
2006	The Trials of Van Occupanther	—	—	—	81	—	—	—	162
2010	The Courage of Others	94	61	21	27	31	30	15	18
2013	Antiphon	150	—	68	84	46	—	—	39
2022	For the Sake of Bethel Woods	—	—	139	—	—	—	—	71
2025	A Bridge to Far	—	—	—	— (Note: Midlake did not enter the official Top French Albums chart, but peaked at number 81 on the Top French Physical Albums chart.)	—	—	—	—

=== Singles and EPs ===
- 2001: Milkmaid Grand Army (EP)
- 2005: Balloon Maker (EP)
- 2005: "Kingfish Pies"
- 2006: "Roscoe"
- 2006: "Young Bride"
- 2006: "Head Home"
- 2007: Oak & Julian (iTunes-only EP)
- 2009: Acts of Man (12" single)
- 2010: Fortune (EP)
- 2010: "Children of the Grounds"
- 2010: "Fortune"
- 2011: "Am I Going Insane" (12" Single, Ltd)
- 2014: "It's Going Down"
- 2016: "The Old and the Young"
- 2016: "Antiphon"
- 2016: "The Fairest Way"

=== Music videos ===
- "Balloon Maker"
- "The Old and the Young"

=== Compilation albums ===
- 2011: Late Night Tales: Midlake

=== Collaborations ===
- 2017: BNQT – Volume 1, (Dualtone/Bella Union)

=== Solo projects ===
- 2018: Two Medicine (Paul Alexander) – Astropsychosis, Bella Union
- 2019: E.B. The Younger (Eric Pulido) – To Each His Own, Bella Union
- 2021: Pneumatic Tubes (Jesse Chandler) - Sunfrost
- 2022: Pneumatic Tubes (Jesse Chandler) - A Letter from TreeTops
- 2023: Harp (Tim Smith) - Albion
- 2025: Pneumatic Tubes (Jesse Chandler) - Runner’s High
