= This Is It (Melba Moore album) =

Studio album by Melba Moore
- Released: April 13, 1976
- Recorded: 1976
- Studios: Mediasound, New York City
- Label: Buddah
- Producer: Van McCoy

Melba Moore chronology
Peach Melba (1975)	This Is It (1976)	Melba (1976)

Professional ratings
Review scores
Source	Rating
Allmusic	3/5 stars

This Is It is the fifth album by singer Melba Moore, released in 1976.

== Background ==
Melba Moore would give credit to her husband/manager Charles Huggins, whom she married in September 1974, with getting her signed to Buddah Records in 1975 — ending a four-year recording studio absence — and with arranging for veteran soul music songwriter/producer Van McCoy to helm Moore's second Buddah album release, which she began recording in January 1976. The album included Moore's rendition of McCoy's deep soul ballad "Lean on Me", first recorded in 1970 by Vivian Reed but most well known as the B-side to Aretha Franklin's 1972 hit "Spanish Harlem". Moore had herself recorded "Lean on Me" in 1972, her rendition being featured on her concert album Melba Moore Live!. However the recruitment of McCoy to helm Moore's album was essentially due to McCoy's success as a producer of disco records, it being hoped that a disco hit would consolidate the somewhat nebulous success Moore had to that point experienced as a recording artist: (Melba Moore quote:)"I just couldn't ignore the [impact] that disco was having on music".

== Reception ==
The album's disco-oriented title track was released in March 1976 and became a discothèque favorite: while the "This Is It" single did afford Moore her first major R&B hit, reaching #18 on the Billboard ranking of R&B singles the track failed to provide her with the desired Pop music breakout, rising no higher than #91 on the Billboard Hot 100 ("This Is It" did become a Top Ten hit on the singles chart for the United Kingdom). "Lean on Me" was issued as followup single to afford Moore a second Top 20 R&B hit peaking at #17. The This Is It album would have a Billboard 200 peak of #145.

The limited success of the This Is It album was evidently encouraging enough for Moore to reteam with McCoy for a second 1976 album release Melba which despite failing to generate a significant hit single fared roughly as well as its predecessor.

== Track listing ==
1. "This Is It" (Van McCoy)
2. "Free" (Charles Kipps)
3. "One Less Morning" (Charles H. Kipps)
4. "Make Me Believe in You" (Curtis Mayfield)
5. "Lean on Me" (Joe Cobb, Van McCoy)
6. "Stay Awhile" (Joe Cobb, Van McCoy)
7. "Play Boy Scout" (Nino Ferrer)
8. "Blood Red Roses" (John Lewin, Michael Valenti)
9. "Brand New" (Earl Hawley Robinson)
