= Get into You =

Studio album by Dannii Minogue
- Released: 4 October 1993
- Recorded: 1992–1993
- Genre: Pop; dance; R&B
- Length: 66:05
- Label: MCA; Mushroom
- Producer: Bruce Forest; Andy Whitmore; Dancin' Danny D; Tim Lever; Mike Percy; Eliot Kennedy; Michael Ward

Dannii Minogue chronology
U.K. Remixes (1991)	Get into You (1993)	Girl (1997)

Singles from Get into You
- 1. "Show You the Way to Go" Released: 20 July 1992; 2. "Love's on Every Corner" Released: 30 November 1992; 3. "This Is It" Released: 5 July 1993; 4. "This Is the Way" Released: 20 September 1993; 5. "Get into You" Released: 21 January 1994

Professional ratings
Review scores
Source	Rating
Music Week	3/5 stars
Smash Hits	3/5 stars
Select	1/5 medals

Get into You is the second album by Australian pop singer Dannii Minogue. It was released by MCA Records on 4 October 1993 in the United Kingdom and a deluxe edition with bonus tracks and remixes was released in 2009.

== Background and composition ==
The album sessions started in 1992, which Minogue discussed on British television in late 1992, whilst promoting her "Love's On Every Corner" single. At that time, there was no album title, as she relays. This album includes the UK Top 40 hit singles "Show You the Way to Go" (which peaked at No. 30), "This Is It" (peaked at No. 10), "This Is the Way" (peaked at No. 27) and "Get Into You" (peaked at No.39).

In 2009, it saw a two-disc remaster, featuring B-side, "It's Time to Move On" along with unreleased tracks and remixes.

== Track listing ==
=== Standard edition ===
No.	Title	Writer(s)	Length
1.	"This Is It"	Van McCoy	3:42
2.	"Love's on Every Corner"	D. Poku, Cathy Dennis, P. Taylor	4:16
3.	"Until We Meet Again"	Steve Hurley, Chantay Savage	4:25
4.	"Tonight's Temptation"	Dannii Minogue, Alvin Moody, Tom Wilentz	5:59
5.	"Be Careful"	Neil Davidge, Piken	5:09
6.	"I Dream"	Kenni Hairston, D. Minogue	4:38
7.	"Show You the Way to Go"	Kenneth Gamble, Leon A. Huff	4:24
8.	"Lucky Tonight"	Carl Boureally, Roz Davis, D. Jones, D. Minogue	3:49
9.	"This Is the Way"	Gary Baylis, Eliot Kennedy, Michael Ward	4:00
10.	"Get into You"	Tracy Ackerman, Tim Lever, Mike Percy	4:12
11.	"If You Really"	Hurley, Savage, Jamie Principle	4:03
12.	"Wish You'd Stop Wishing"	Eric Foster White	5:11
13.	"Kiss and Make Up"	Boureally, Davis, D. Minogue	4:17
14.	"Show You the Way to Go" (12" version)	Gamble, Huff	8:00
Total length:			66:05

=== Japanese edition ===
No.	Title	Writer(s)	Length
13.	"This Is the Way" (The Cool 7")	Baylis, Kennedy, Ward	3:48
14.	"This Is the Way" (12" version)	Baylis, Kennedy, Ward	6:54
Total length:			76:47

=== Deluxe edition (2009) ===
Remastered edition issued by Palare Records on 7 December 2009, includes the full album plus rare and previously unreleased songs; excluding the b-side, "No Secret" for unknown reasons.

Disc one
No.	Title	Writer(s)	Length
1.	"This Is It"	Van McCoy	3:42
2.	"Love's on Every Corner"	D. Poku, Cathy Dennis, P. Taylor	4:16
3.	"Until We Meet Again"	Steve Hurley, Chantay Savage	4:25
4.	"Tonight's Temptation"	Dannii Minogue, Alvin Moody, Tom Wilentz	5:59
5.	"Be Careful"	Neil Davidge, Piken	5:09
6.	"I Dream"	Kenni Hairston, D. Minogue	4:38
7.	"Show You the Way to Go"	Kenneth Gamble, Leon A. Huff	4:24
8.	"Lucky Tonight"	Carl Boureally, Roz Davis, D. Jones, D. Minogue	3:49
9.	"This Is the Way"	Gary Baylis, Eliot Kennedy, Michael Ward	4:00
10.	"Get into You"	Tracy Ackerman, Tim Lever, Mike Percy	4:12
11.	"If You Really"	Hurley, Savage, Jamie Principle	4:03
12.	"Wish You'd Stop Wishing"	Eric Foster White	5:11
13.	"Kiss and Make Up"	Boureally, Davis, D. Minogue	4:17
14.	"Feels So Good"	Jeremiah McAllister, Eric Miller	3:56
15.	"Hold On"	Boureally, Davis, D. Minogue	4:36
16.	"If You're in Love"	Moody, Jarrod Miles, D.Minogue	5:19
17.	"It's Time to Move On"	Moody, D.Minogue	4:49
Total length:			76:45

Disc two
No.	Title	Writer(s)	Length
1.	"Show You the Way to Go" (12" version)	Kenneth Gamble, Leon A. Huff	8:01
2.	"Love's on Every Corner" (12" Club Mix)	D. Poku, Cathy Dennis, P. Taylor	8:24
3.	"This Is It" (Alternative 12" Mix)	Van McCoy	6:18
4.	"This Is the Way" (12" version)	Gary Baylis, Eliot Kennedy, Michael Ward	6:53
5.	"Get into You" (Hustlers Convention Disco Mix)	Tracy Ackerman, Tim Lever, Mike Percy	7:56
6.	"Be Careful" (Eric Kupper 12" Vocal Mix)	Neil Davidge, Piken	6:30
7.	"Show You the Way to Go" (Eron Irving Remix)	Gamble, Huff	4:43
8.	"This Is It" (Doc Baron Freestyle Remix)	McCoy	4:12
9.	"Love's on Every Corner" (12" Bass in Your Face Dub)	Poku, Dennis, Taylor	6:16
10.	"Get into You" (Arizona Club Mix)	Ackerman, Lever, Percy	6:01
11.	"Show You the Way to Go" (7" Dub)	Gamble, Huff	3:41
12.	"This Is It" (One World Original 7" Mix)	McCoy	3:37
13.	"Be Careful" (Eric Kupper Radio Edit)	Davidge, Piken	3:45
Total length:			76:15

== Charts ==
Chart (1993)	Peak position
Australian Albums (ARIA)	53
UK Albums (OCC)	52

== Formats ==
These are the formats of major album releases of Get into You:

Country	Release format	Cat. no.	Label	Release date
Australia	CD	TVD93392	Mushroom	October 1993
United Kingdom	CD	MCD10909	MCA	October 1993
United Kingdom	CD	MCD10909	MCA	October 1993
United Kingdom	Cassette	MCC10909	MCA	October 1993
Japan	CD	ALCB-9607	Alfa International	6 July 1994
United Kingdom	Deluxe CD	PALARE004CD	Cargo	7 December 2009

The cover artwork of Get into You: Video Collection.

== Get into You: Video Collection ==
A collection of music videos produced to promote the album's singles was released in the UK on 30 May 1994 by Mushroom UK. The VHS reached number 35 on the UK video chart. It also contained an interview with Minogue and behind-the-scenes footage.

=== Track listing ===
1. "Love's on Every Corner"
2. "Show You the Way to Go"
3. "This Is It"
4. "This Is the Way"
5. "Get into You"
6. Interview & Dannii's personal video footage from her travels & live shows
