= Milkmaid Grand Army =

EP by Midlake
- Released: 2001
- Recorded: The Echo Lab and The Valve Studio, October, 2001
- Genre: Rock
- Length: 24:53
- Producer: Midlake

Midlake chronology
Milkmaid Grand Army (2001)	Bamnan and Slivercork (2004)

Professional ratings
Review scores
Source	Rating
AllMusic	3/5 stars
Drowned in Sound	5/10

Milkmaid Grand Army is the debut release by the US band Midlake. The EP was originally released in 2001 by the band in a limited edition of 1,000 before they signed to Bella Union.

== Track listing ==
1. "She Removes Her Spiral Hair" - 3:38
2. "Paper Gown" - 4:30
3. "Excited But Not Enough" - 4:18
4. "I Lost My Bodyweight In The Forest" - 1:18
5. "Simple" - 3:49
6. "Roller Skate (Farewell June)" - 3:34
7. "Golden Hour" - 3:41
