= Bamnan and Slivercork =

Studio album by Midlake
- Released: June 2004
- Genre: Psychedelic pop
- Length: 46:04
- Label: Bella Union
- Producer: Midlake

Midlake chronology
Milkmaid Grand Army (2001)	Bamnan and Slivercork (2004)	Balloon Maker (2005)

Professional ratings
Review scores
Source	Rating
AllMusic	3.5/5 stars
Sputnikmusic	5/5

Bamnan and Slivercork is the debut studio album by American folk rock band Midlake that was released in 2004 with 12 tracks to positive reviews. The songs "Balloon Maker" and "Kingfish Pies" were released as singles.

== Track listing ==
1. "They Cannot Let It Expand" – 2:58
2. "Balloon Maker" – 5:05
3. "Kingfish Pies" – 4:23
4. "I Guess I'll Take Care" – 3:22
5. "Some of Them Were Superstitious" – 5:57
6. "The Reprimand" – 1:21
7. "The Jungler" – 3:44
8. "He Tried to Escape" – 4:32
9. "Mopper's Medley" – 5:02
10. "No One Knew Where We Were" – 5:06
11. "Anabel" – 2:26
12. "Mr. Amateur" – 2:06

== Personnel ==
- Tim Smith — vocals, piano, keyboards, acoustic guitar, electric guitar, flute
- Eric Pulido — electric guitar, acoustic guitar, 12-string acoustic guitar, keyboards, backing vocals
- Eric Nichelson — keyboards, piano, acoustic guitar, 12-string acoustic guitar, electric guitar
- Paul Alexander — bass, double bass, electric guitar, keyboards, piano, bassoon
- McKenzie Smith — drums, percussion

== Production notes ==
- Produced by Midlake
- Recorded and mixed by Midlake
- Art by Tim Smith
- Recorded and mixed in Denton, TX

First LP/vinyl version out on 22 April 2017 for Record Store Day. Yellow vinyl, limited.
