= Love's on Every Corner =

1992 single by Dannii Minogue

Single by Dannii Minogue

from the album Get into You
- Released: 30 November 1992
- Length: 4:16
- Label: MCA
- Songwriters: Danny Poku; Cathy Dennis; Paul Taylor
- Producer: Dancin' Danny D

Dannii Minogue singles chronology
"Show You the Way to Go" (1992)	"Love's on Every Corner" (1992)	"This Is It" (1993)

"Love's on Every Corner" is a song written by Danny Poku, Cathy Dennis, and Paul Taylor for Australian singer Dannii Minogue's second album, Get into You (1993). The song was produced by Dancin' Danny D and was released as the album's second single in November 1992, reaching the top 50 in the United Kingdom. The single was not released in Australia. The song features Dennis and Juliet Roberts on backing vocals, and a demo version of the track with just Dennis's vocals also exists.

== Track listings ==
CD single 1

1. "Love's on Every Corner" (7-inch mix)
2. "Love's on Every Corner" (12-inch mix)
3. "Love's on Every Corner" (Bass in Your Face dub)

CD single 2

1. "Love's on Every Corner" (7-inch mix)
2. "Love and Kisses"
3. "Jump to the Beat" (Unnamed Mix similar to "album version" does not feature rap)
4. "Baby Love"

UK cassette single

1. "Love's on Every Corner" (7-inch mix)
2. "Love and Kisses"

7" Vinyl

1. "Love's on Every Corner" (7-inch mix)
2. "Love's on Every Corner" (Instrumental) Master Mix version

== Personnel ==
- Dannii Minogue – lead vocals
- Dancin' Danny D – production
- Andrew MacPherson – photography

== Charts ==
Chart (1992)	Peak position
UK Singles (OCC)	44
