= You Stepped into My Life =

1976 song by the Bee Gees

Single by Bee Gees

from the album Children of the World
- A-side: "Love So Right"
- Released: September 1976
- Recorded: 3 February 1976, 7 May 1976
- Studio: Criteria, Miami, Florida; Quebec, Canada
- Genre: Disco; soul
- Length: 3:25
- Label: RSO
- Songwriters: Barry, Robin & Maurice Gibb
- Producers: Bee Gees, Albhy Galuten, Karl Richardson

Bee Gees flipsides singles chronology
"Subway" (1976)	"You Stepped into My Life" (1976)	"Lovers" (1976)

"You Stepped into My Life" is a song released by the Bee Gees in September 1976 on the album Children of the World. It was also released as the B-side of "Love So Right". Written by Barry, Robin & Maurice Gibb.

In Canada, this song was chosen as the A-side and its flipside was "Love So Right". In Scandinavia and UK, it released as a double A side single with "Love So Right". AllMusic's Bruce Eder called this funk number as one of the "soul ballads" on the album Children of the World.

== Recording ==
The Bee Gees started to record this song on February 3 at Criteria Studios in Miami. It was finished on May 7 after they recorded and finished "Can't Keep a Good Man Down" and "Boogie Child" the day before in Le Studio in Quebec.

== Musical structure ==
The first parts of the song features a funky electric and bass guitar beat by Alan Kendall and Maurice Gibb, and later joined by Blue Weaver through synthesizers and keyboards.

The song is all about a singer became happy when he met his lover; the singer also tells his painful memory before he met his lover, and described her touch to him as an "ecstasy".

== Personnel ==
- Barry Gibb — lead vocals, acoustic guitar
- Maurice Gibb — bass guitar
- Alan Kendall — electric guitar
- Dennis Bryon — drums
- Blue Weaver — synthesizer, keyboards

== Cover versions ==
"You Stepped into My Life"

Single by Melba Moore

from the album Melba '78
- B-side: "There's No Other Like You"
- Released: September 1978
- Studio: Sigma Sound Studios
- Genre: Disco, post-disco
- Length: 4:00 (single version) 5:04 (album version) 7:48 (John Luongo Remix)
- Label: Epic
- Songwriters: Barry, Robin & Maurice Gibb
- Producers: Gene McFadden, John Whitehead, Jerry Cohen Remixer/Additional Production = John Luongo

Melba Moore singles chronology
"Standing Right Here" (1977)	"You Stepped into My Life" (1978)	"Pick Me Up, I'll Dance" (1978)

- Melba Moore recorded a Philly soul version of the song for her 1978 Epic Records album release Melba, produced by McFadden & Whitehead with Jerry Cohen. The singer and her producers had aimed at scoring Moore a breakout hit with a Bee Gees cover and chose "You Stepped into My Life", the group's own original version being comparatively low-profile. "You Stepped into My Life" did afford Moore a major club hit and became the second and most successful of her two Billboard Hot 100 singles while remaining a top 40 shortfall with a No. 47 peak. The track also reached No. 17 on the Billboard ranking of R&B singles. In 2024, the song was certified platinum for sales of a million copies in the US.
- Wayne Newton released his version as a single in 1979 on Aries Records; it reached No. 90 in the US.
