= Soul Exposed =

Studio album by Melba Moore
- Released: March 26, 1990
- Length: 53:21
- Label: Orpheus; Capitol
- Producer: David "Pic" Conley; Norman Connors; Sir Gant; Howard King; William A. Rhineheart; Rahni Song; Daniel Telefaro; David Townsend; Linda Vitali; Bebe Winans

Melba Moore chronology
I'm in Love (1986)	Soul Exposed (1990)	Happy Together (1996)

Singles from Soul Exposed
- 1. "Do You Really Want My Love" Released: 1990; 2. "Lift Every Voice and Sing" Released: 1990

Soul Exposed is the seventeenth album by American singer Melba Moore. It was released by Orpheus Music and Capitol Records on March 26, 1990. Her final release with Capitol, the album spawned the hits "Do You Really Want My Love" and "Lift Every Voice and Sing," the latter of which went to number nine on Billboard's R&B chart.

== Critical reception ==
Professional ratings
Review scores
Source	Rating
AllMusic	3/5 stars
Entertainment Weekly	B−

AllMusic editor Ed Hogan found that Soul Exposed "seemed to touch on all of [Moore's] musical roots," while showing her "wide stylistic range." Entertainment Weekly's Greg Sandow felt that the album "starts off as danceable R&B, hard to distinguish from anyone else’s. At least it’s agreeable R&B. And Moore does sing it better than most. Even her characteristic squeals fall into place as a particularly energetic form of emphasis."

== Track listing ==
Side one
No.	Title	Writer(s)	Producer(s)	Length
1.	"Do You Really Want My Love"	David "Pic" Conley; David Townsend	Conley; Townsend	4:31
2.	"Hold Me"	Daniel Telefaro; Linda Vitali; Doug Booth	Telefaro; Vitali	4:34
3.	"New Love"	William A. Rhineheart	Rhineheart	3:57
4.	"I Love Being In Love"	Mary Unobsky; Michael O'Hara; Sami McKinney	O'Hara; McKinney	4:52
5.	"Lift Every Voice and Sing"	James Weldon Johnson; John Rosamond Johnson	Bebe Winans	5:49

Side two
No.	Title	Writer(s)	Producer(s)	Length
6.	"Face to Face"	Bruce Purse; Janice Dempsey	Telefaro; Vitali; Dempsey^{[a]}	4:34
7.	"Crying in the Night"	Howard King; Lisa Fischer	King; Rahni Song	4:12
8.	"Don't You Want to Be My Lover"	Charlie Singleton; Dean Gant	Sir Gant	3:53
9.	"Too Many Lovers"	Conley; Townsend; Ian Foster	Conley; Townsend	4:20
10.	"Stormy Weather"	Harold Arlen; Ted Koehler	Norman Connors	5:36

Notes

- ^{^[a]} denotes co-producer

== Charts ==
Chart (1990)	Peak position
US Top R&B/Hip-Hop Albums (Billboard)	52
