= Never Say Never (Melba Moore album) =

Studio album by Melba Moore
- Released: November 14, 1983
- Length: 43:28
- Label: Capitol
- Producer: John "Skip" Anderson; Rahni Harris; Kashif; Paul Laurence; Steve Williams

Melba Moore chronology
The Other Side of the Rainbow (1982)	Never Say Never (1983)	Read My Lips (1985)

Professional ratings
Review scores
Source	Rating
Allmusic	2/5 stars

Never Say Never is the thirteenth album by American singer Melba Moore. It was released by Capitol Records on November 14, 1983. This album featured the hits "Keeping My Lover Satisfied", "Livin' for Your Love" and "Love Me Right" peaking at number 9 on the US Billboard Top R&B/Hip Hop Albums chart and number 147 on the Billboard 200. This album was notable for a remake of her 1976 hit "Lean on Me".

== Track listing ==
Side one
No.	Title	Writer(s)	Producer(s)	Length
1.	"Love Me Right"	Paul Laurence	Laurence	4:09
2.	"Keepin' My Lover Satisfied"	Laurence; Freddie Jackson	Laurence	5:12
3.	"Got to Have Your Love"	Laurence	Laurence	5:09
4.	"Livin' for Your Love"	La La	Kashif	4:50

Side two
No.	Title	Writer(s)	Producer(s)	Length
5.	"It's Really Love"	La La	Kashif	4:36
6.	"Never Say Never"	John "Skip" Anderson; Steve Williams	Anderson; Williams	4:41
7.	"Lovin' Touch"	Anderson; Williams	Anderson; Williams	4:47
8.	"Lean on Me"	Joe Cobb; Van McCoy	Rahni Harris	4:28

== Charts ==
=== Weekly charts ===
Chart (1983–1984)	Peak position
US Billboard 200	147
US Top R&B/Hip-Hop Albums (Billboard)	9

=== Year-end charts ===
Chart (1984)	Position
US Top R&B/Hip-Hop Albums (Billboard)	22
