= Rescue Me (EuroGroove song) =

1995 single by EuroGroove

Single by EuroGroove with Dannii Minogue

from the album Eurogroove No. 03
- Released: February 1, 1995
- Recorded: 1994
- Length: 5:43
- Label: Cutting Edge
- Songwriters: Dannii Minogue; Joey Johnson; Dee Wright
- Producer: Tetsuya Komuro

EuroGroove singles chronology
"Dive to Paradise" (1995)	"Rescue Me" (1995)	"Boogie Woogie" (1995)

Dannii Minogue singles chronology
"Get into You" (1994)	"Rescue Me" (1995)	"Boogie Woogie" (1995)

"Rescue Me" is a song recorded by Australian singer Dannii Minogue, Joey Johnson and Dee Wright for Eurogroove's greatest hits album The Best Of (1995). The song features guest vocals by Minogue and was produced by Tetsuya Komuro. It was released as a single in Europe and Japan, and reached No. 1 on the Japanese International Singles chart and 99 in the UK Singles Charts.

== Formats and track listings ==
=== CD single ===
1. "Rescue Me" (Radio Edit) – 5:43
2. "Rescue Me" (Original Full Length mix) – 6:20
3. "Rescue Me" (Soul Fake remix) – 7:29
