= Late Night Tales: Trentemøller =

Compilation album by Trentemøller
- Released: 30 May 2011
- Genre: Electronic, folk
- Label: Night Time Stories
- Producer: Trentemøller
- Compiler: Trentemøller

Late Night Tales chronology
Late Night Tales: Midlake (2011)	Late Night Tales: Trentemøller (2011)	Late Night Tales: MGMT (2011)

Late Night Tales: Trentemøller is a mix album compiled by Danish electronic music producer Trentemøller, released on 30 May 2011 as part of the Late Night Tales series.

The mix features tracks from artists such as Velvet Underground & Nico, M. Ward, The Black Angels (band), Low and We Fell to Earth. Paul Morley contributes the spoken word piece, "Lost For Words Pt. 1". Trentemøller also produced an exclusive cover version of Chris Isaak's "Blue Hotel".

== Track listing ==
No.	Title	Artist(s)	Length
1.	"Waves Become Wings"	This Mortal Coil
2.	"La Lliarona"	Kid Congo & The Pink Monkey Birds
3.	"Science Killer"	The Black Angels
4.	"The Mole (Trentemøller Remix)" (Trentemøller Remix)	Chimes & Bells
5.	"(That's How You Sing) Amazing Grace"	Low
6.	"Mary of Silence"	Mazzy Star
7.	"Venus in Furs"	Velvet Underground and Nico
8.	"Safe Word"	Vampire Hands
9.	"Walking in the Sand"	The Shangri-Las
10.	"7 Heures Du Matin"	Jacqueline Taïeb
11.	"Poor Boy, Minor Key"	M. Ward
12.	"Noise on the Line"	Darkness Falls
13.	"Unavailable"	Papercuts
14.	"Lights Out"	We Fell to Earth
15.	"Ghost in the Trees"	Thee Oh Sees
16.	"Blue Hotel"	Trentemøller
17.	"The Proposition #1"	Nick Cave and Warren Ellis
18.	"Full Moon"	Eden Ahbez
19.	"Rehearsal"	Ekko
20.	"Lost for Words Pt. 1"	Paul Morley
