= Look What You're Doing to the Man =

Studio album by Melba Moore
- Released: January 29, 1971
- Recorded: 1970
- Label: Mercury
- Producer: Jim Fragale

Melba Moore chronology
I Got Love (1970)	Look What You're Doing to the Man (1971)	Melba Moore Live! (1972)

Look What You're Doing to the Man is the second album by singer Melba Moore, released in 1971. The cover photograph was by Richard Avedon.

== Track listing ==
1. "Look What You're Doing to the Man" (Jim Fragale, Andy Badale, Frank Stanton) - 2:45
2. "Searchin' For a Dream" (Clifton Davis) - 3:00
3. "I Messed Up On a Good Thing" (Clint Ballard Jr., Jim Fragale)
4. Medley: "Walk a Mile in My Shoes" (Joe South)/"Twenty Five Miles" (Edwin Starr, Harvey Fuqua, Johnny Bristol) - 4:05
5. "Patience is Rewarded" (Clifton Davis) - 3:50
6. "You Got the Power (To Make Me Happy)" (Andy Badale, Jim Fragale) - 2:46
7. "If I Had a Million" (from the Off-Broadway musical The Me Nobody Knows) (Will Holt, Gary William Friedman) - 3:16
8. "He Ain't Heavy, He's My Brother" (Bobby Scott, Bob Russell) - 4:08
9. "Heaven Help Us All" (Ron Miller) - 3:15
10. "The Thrill is Gone (From Yesterday's Kiss)" (Arthur Benson, Dale Petite) - 3:22
11. "Loving You Comes So Easy" (Jim Fragale, Andy Badale) - 4:05

== Personnel ==
- Jimmy Wisner, Charles Coleman, Bert DeCoteaux, Charles Calello, Bernie Hoffer, Thom Bell - arrangements

== Charts ==
Chart (1971)	Peak position
US Billboard Top LPs	157
US Billboard Best Selling Soul LP's	43
