= The Other Side of the Rainbow (album) =

Studio album by Melba Moore
- Released: October 10, 1982
- Studio: Park South Studios; Celestial Sound Studios; Mediasound, New York City; Nineteen Recording Studios
- Length: 56:47
- Label: Capitol
- Producer: Kashif; Paul Laurence; Morrie Brown; Rahni Harris

Melba Moore chronology
What a Woman Needs (1981)	The Other Side of the Rainbow (1982)	Never Say Never (1983)

Singles from The Other Side of the Rainbow
- 1. "Love's Comin' at Ya" Released: 1982; 2. "Mind Up Tonight" Released: 1983; 3. "Underlove" Released: 1983

Professional ratings
Review scores
Source	Rating
Allmusic	3.5/5 stars

The Other Side of the Rainbow is the twelfth album by American singer Melba Moore. It was released by Capitol Records on October 10, 1982. The album features her top 10 R&B and dance hit "Love's Comin' At Ya". The Other Side of the Rainbow's title track is best known for its ending note, which Melba holds for 38 seconds.

== Track listing ==
Side A8
No.	Title	Writer(s)	Producer(s)	Length
1.	"Love's Comin' at Ya"	Paul Laurence	Laurence	5:42
2.	"Underlove"	Kashif	Kashif	5:15
3.	"Mind Up Tonight"	Thomas	Laurence	5:30
4.	"Knack for Me"	Laurence	Laurence	4:45

Side B
No.	Title	Writer(s)	Producer(s)	Length
5.	"How's Love Been Treatin' You"	Lotti Golden; Richard Scher	Morrie Brown	4:55
6.	"Don't Go Away"	Scott White; Karen Harris	Rahni Harris	4:13
7.	"I Can't Help Myself (Sugar Pie, Honey Bunch)"	Eddie Holland; Lamont Dozier; Brian Holland	Rahni Harris	4:44
8.	"The Other Side of the Rainbow"	Lorraine Theresa Cole; Vincent Stovall; Melba Moore	Rahni Harris	5:49

== Charts ==
=== Weekly charts ===
Chart (1982–1983)	Peak position
US Billboard 200	152
US Top R&B/Hip-Hop Albums (Billboard)	18

=== Year-end charts ===
Chart (1983)	Position
US Top R&B/Hip-Hop Albums (Billboard)	33
