= I'm in Love (Melba Moore album) =

Studio album by Melba Moore
- Released: June 1, 1988
- Length: 46:42
- Label: Capitol
- Producer: Kashif; Howard King; Morgan & Morgan; Gene McFadden; Ernie Poccia; Kevin "Chad" Robinson; Rahni Song; Vaneese Thomas; Linda Vitali; Wayne Warnecke

Melba Moore chronology
A Lot of Love (1986)	I'm in Love (1988)	Soul Exposed (1990)

I'm in Love is the sixteenth album by American singer Melba Moore. It was by Capitol Records on released on June 1, 1988. The album peaked at number 45 on the US Top R&B/Hip-Hop Albums chart.

== Critical reception ==
Professional ratings
Review scores
Source	Rating
Allmusic	3/5 stars

AllMusic rated I'm in Love three out of five stars.

== Track listing ==
Side one
No.	Title	Writer(s)	Producer(s)	Length
1.	"Love and Kisses"	Rahni Song	Song	4:47
2.	"I'm in Love" (duet with Kashif)	Kashif	Kashif	4:51
3.	"Love Always Finds a Way (To Your Heart)"	Mark Stevens; Brian Morgan; Shelly Morgan	Morgan & Morgan	4:50
4.	"I Can't Complain" (duet with Freddie Jackson)	Gene McFadden; James McKinley; Linda Vitali	McFadden; Vitali^{[a]}	4:09
5.	"I Don't Know No One Else to Turn To"	McFadden; John Whitehead; Victor Carstarphen	McFadden; Vitali^{[a]}	5:00

Side two
No.	Title	Writer(s)	Producer(s)	Length
6.	"I'll Never Find Another You"	Vaneese Thomas	Thomas; Ernie Poccia; Wayne Warnecke	4:16
7.	"Keeps Me Running Back"	Carolyn Mitchell; Poccia	Thomas; Poccia; Warnecke	4:00
8.	"First Love"	Kevin "Chad" Robinson	Chad; Howard King	5:11
9.	"This Time"	McFadden; McKinney; Vitali; Reggie Neal	McFadden; Vitali^{[a]}	4:45
10.	"Test of Time"	André Pessis; Cory Lerios	McFadden; Vitali^{[a]}	4:20

Notes

- ^{^[a]} denotes associate production

== Charts ==
Chart (1988)	Peak position
US Top R&B/Hip-Hop Albums (Billboard)	45
