= Melba (1976 album) =

Studio album by Melba Moore
- Released: December 2, 1976
- Recorded: 1976
- Label: Buddah
- Producers: Van McCoy, Charles Kipps

Melba Moore chronology
This Is It (1976)	Melba (1976)	A Portrait of Melba (1977)

Professional ratings
Review scores
Source	Rating
Allmusic	2/5 stars

Melba is the sixth album by singer Melba Moore, released in late 1976.

== Track listing ==
1. "The Way You Make Me Feel" (Charles Kipps)
2. "Good Love Makes Everything Alright" (Richard Harris, Van McCoy)
3. "The Long and Winding Road" (John Lennon, Paul McCartney)
4. "Ain't No Love Lost" (Curtis Mayfield)
5. "The Greatest Feeling" (Richard Harris, Van McCoy)
6. "Mighty Clouds of Joy" (Buddy Buie, Robert Nix)
7. "(I Need) Someone" (Charles Kipps)
8. "So Many Mountains" (Joe Cobb, Van McCoy)
