= Closer (Melba Moore album) =

Studio album by Melba Moore
- Released: July 20, 1980
- Recorded: 1980
- Label: Epic
- Producer: Bruce Hawes, Victor Carstarphen, Melba Moore

Melba Moore chronology
Burn (1979)	Closer (1980)	What a Woman Needs (1981)

Closer is the tenth album by singer Melba Moore, released in 1980. It was also her final album on Epic Records before moving to EMI in 1981.

== Track listing ==
All tracks composed by Bruce Hawes, Melba Moore and Victor Carstarphen; except where indicated

1. "Everything So Good About You"
2. "You Got Me Loving You" (Gene McFadden, John Whitehead, Jerry Cohen)
3. "Closer"
4. "Something On Your Mind"
5. "Shame"
6. "Never Gonna Let You Get Away" (Clarence Brice, Theodore Robinson)
7. "Rest Inside my Love" (Jesse Butler, Lawrence Hanks, Rodney Massey)
8. "I Could Never Miss You More" (Neil Hamilton)
9. "Next to You" (Janice Gugliuzza, Phillip T. Pugh)
10. "You Don't Know (What You Do to Me)"
