= Get into You (song) =

1994 single by Dannii Minogue

Single by Dannii Minogue

from the album Get into You
- Released: 21 January 1994
- Length: 4:12
- Label: Mushroom
- Songwriters: Mike Percy; Tim Lever; Tracy Ackerman
- Producers: Tim Lever; Mike Percy

Dannii Minogue singles chronology
"This Is the Way" (1993)	"Get into You" (1994)	"Rescue Me" (1995)

"Get into You" is a song written by Mike Percy and Tim Lever for Australian singer and actress Dannii Minogue's second album, Get into You (1993). It was produced by Lever and Percy and received a mixed reception from music critics. The single was released in Japan in January 1994 and in the United Kingdom four months later, when it entered the top 40 of the UK Singles Chart. A music video was made to promote the single.

== Critical reception ==
In his weekly UK chart commentary, James Masterton wrote, "The new single is more of the kind of record she turns out as standard and has little prospect of reaching the heights of earlier releases." Alan Jones from Music Week said, "The title track from Minogue's last MCA album makes a belated appearance. And should radio warm to the Hustler's Convention's housed-up transformations of the track, already big in the clubs, Minogue could net another medium-sized hit." James Hamilton from the RM Dance Update described the remix as a "plaintive remorselessly powerful jiggly throbbing" track.

== Track listings ==
- CD single
1. "Get into You" (Original 7-inch Radio edit)
2. "Get into You" (Hustlers Convention Disco Mix Radio edit)
3. "Get into You" (Hustlers Convention Disco mix)
4. "Get into You" (Arizona Club mix)
5. "Get into You" (Hustlers Convention Disco dub)
- UK vinyl single
1. "Get into You" (Hustlers Convention Disco mix)
2. "Get into You" (Hustlers Convention Disco dub)
3. "Get into You" (Arizona Club mix)
4. "Be Careful" (Eric Kupper dub) Mislabelled as "Get into You" (Eric Kupper dub)
- Cassette single
1. "Get into You" (Original 7-inch Radio edit)
2. "Get into You" (Hustlers Convention Disco Mix Radio edit)

== Charts ==
Weekly chart performance for "Get into You"
Chart (1994)	Peak position
Australia (ARIA)	79
UK Singles (OCC)	39
UK Dance (Music Week)	24
UK Club Chart (Music Week)	17

== Release history ==
Release dates and formats for "Get into You"
Region	Date	Format(s)	Label(s)	Ref.
Japan	21 January 1994	CD	Alfa	
United Kingdom	30 May 1994	7-inch vinyl; 12-inch vinyl; CD; cassette	Mushroom	
Australia	20 June 1994	CD; cassette	Mushroom	
