= What a Woman Needs =

Studio album by Melba Moore
- Released: October 12, 1981
- Length: 46:59
- Label: EMI America
- Producer: Ted Currier; Kashif; Gene McFadden; John Whitehead

Melba Moore chronology
Closer (1980)	What a Woman Needs (1981)	The Other Side of the Rainbow (1982)

What a Woman Needs is the eleventh studio album by American singer Melba Moore. It was released by EMI America Records on October 12, 1981. Her debut project with the label, it reached number 46 US Top R&B/Hip-Hop Albums chart. Moore wrote six of the eight songs.

== Track listing ==
Side A
No.	Title	Writer(s)	Producer(s)	Length
1.	"Let's Stand Together"	Gene McFadden; John Whitehead; Melba Moore	McFadden; Whitehead	5:03
2.	"Your Sweet Lovin'"	Bruce Hawes; Moore	McFadden; Whitehead	3:38
3.	"What a Woman Needs"	Hawes; Jason Smith; Moore	McFadden; Whitehead	4:21
4.	"Take My Love"	Kashif	Kashif	6:30

Side B
No.	Title	Writer(s)	Producer(s)	Length
5.	"Overnight Sensation"	Gloria Sklerov; Pamela Phillips	McFadden; Whitehead	4:22
6.	"Each Second"	Jerry Cohen; McFadden; Whitehead	McFadden; Whitehead	5:12
7.	"Piece of the Rock"	Alvin Fields; Frank Fuchs; Jolyon Skinner	Ted Currier	4:12
8.	"Let's Get Back to Lovin'"	Cohen; McFadden; Whitehead	Harris	3:30

== Charts ==
Chart (1981)	Peak position
US Top R&B/Hip-Hop Albums (Billboard)	46
