= Melba Moore Live! =

Live album by Melba Moore
- Released: July 21, 1972
- Recorded: November 7, 1971
- Venue: Philharmonic Hall, New York City
- Label: Mercury

Melba Moore chronology
Look What You're Doing to the Man (1971)	Melba Moore Live! (1972)	Peach Melba (1975)

Melba Moore Live is the third album by singer Melba Moore, released in 1972. This album was recorded live at the New York Philharmonic Hall on November 7, 1971.

== Track listing ==
1. "New World Coming" (Barry Mann, Cynthia Weil) -3:13
2. "Blue Skies" (Irving Berlin) - 2:30
3. Medley: "Lady Madonna" (Paul McCartney)/"Summertime" (DuBose Heyward, George Gershwin)/"Dat Dere" (Bobby Timmons, Oscar Brown, Jr.)/"God Bless the Child" (Arthur Herzog, Jr., Billie Holiday) - 10:28
4. Medley: "Walk a Mile in My Shoes" (Joe South)/"Twenty Five Miles" (Edwin Starr, Harvey Fuqua, Johnny Bristol)
5. "Never Can Say Goodbye" (Clifton Davis) - 3:20
6. Medley: "Theme from Hair" (Galt MacDermot, Gerome Ragni, James Rado)/"Is it True Blondes Have More Fun" (Walter Marks)/"Purlie" (Gary Geld, Peter Udell) - 6:14
7. "Then We Can Try Again" (Clay McMurray, James Dean) - 2:55
8. "Lean on Me" (Joe Cobb, Van McCoy) - 5:06
