= I Got Love (album) =

Studio album by Melba Moore
- Released: June 9, 1970
- Recorded: 1969–1970
- Genres: R&B; soul
- Label: Mercury
- Producer: Jim Fragale

Melba Moore chronology
| I Got Love (1970) | Look What You're Doing to the Man (1971) |

I Got Love is the 1970 debut album by American singer Melba Moore. Noted as her debut album, Moore was nominated for the New Artist award at the 13th Annual Grammy Awards in 1971. The album was arranged and conducted by Charlie Calello.

== Track listing ==
1. I Got Love" (from the Broadway musical Purlie) (Gary Geld, Peter Udell) - 2:58
2. "Time and Love" (Laura Nyro) - 3:10
3. "I Messed Up On a Good Thing" (Clint Ballard Jr., Jim Fragale) - 2:39
4. "Purlie" (from the Broadway musical Purlie) (Gary Geld, Peter Udell) - 2:38
5. "Captain St. Lucifer" (Laura Nyro) - 3:21
6. "I Love Making Love to You" (Andy Badale, Jim Fragale) - 2:53
7. "We're Living to Give (To Give to Each Other)" (Andy Badale, Jim Fragale) - 3:05
8. "Sunny" (Bobby Hebb) - 4:12
9. "The Flesh Failures (Let The Sunshine In)" (from the Broadway musical Hair) (Galt MacDermot, Gerome Ragni, James Rado) - 3:18
10. "Easy To Be Hard" (from the Broadway musical Hair) (Galt MacDermot, Gerome Ragni, James Rado) - 3:38
11. "He Come Down This Morning" (from the Broadway musical Raisin in the Sun) (Judd Woldin, Robert Brittan) - 3:14
12. "The Facade" (Jim Fragale, Lou Stallman) - 3:26

== Personnel ==
- Charlie Calello - arrangements, conductor
- Thom Bell - arrangement on "Living to Give"
- Jimmy Wisner - arrangement on "Purlie"
