= Boogie Woogie (song) =

"Boogie-Woogie"

Single by EuroGroove with Dannii Minogue

from the album EuroGroove: The Best Of
- Released: June 1995
- Recorded: 1995
- Genre: Dance-pop
- Length: 4:11
- Label: Cutting Edge
- Songwriter(s): Tetsuya Komuro, Dannii Minogue, Dee Wright
- Producer(s): Tetsuya Komuro, Pete Hammond, Steve Hammond

EuroGroove singles chronology
"Rescue Me" (1995)	"Boogie Woogie" (1995)

Dannii Minogue singles chronology
"Rescue Me" (1995)	"Boogie Woogie" (1995)	"All I Wanna Do" (1997)

"Boogie Woogie" is a song written by Australian singer Dannii Minogue and Dee Wright for Eurogroove's greatest hits album The Best Of (1995). The song features guest vocals by Minogue and was produced by Tetsuya Komuro. It was released as a Japanese-only single in June 1995 and reached number one on the Japanese singles chart.

== Formats and track listings ==
These are the formats and track listings of major single releases of "Boogie Woogie". CD single
(CTDR-26002; Released June 1995)

1. "Boogie Woogie" (Original mix) – 4:11
2. "Boogie Woogie" (Extended mix) – 6:21
3. "Boogie Woogie" (Club remix) – 4:49
