= The Courage of Others =

Studio album by Midlake
- Released: February 1, 2010
- Genre: Folk rock Progressive folk
- Length: 41:45
- Label: Bella Union

Midlake chronology
| The Trials of Van Occupanther (2006) | The Courage of Others (2010) | Antiphon (2013) |

The Courage of Others is the third studio album by American folk rock band Midlake. It was released on February 1, 2010, on Bella Union Records. The album sleeve pays homage to Andrei Rublev, a 1966 film by Russian writer and director Andrei Tarkovsky.

== Reception ==
Professional ratings
Review scores
| Source | Rating |
|---|---|
| AllMusic | 3.5/5 stars |
| BBC | (positive) |
| Drowned in Sound | 8/10 stars |
| musicOMH | 9/10 stars |
| NME | 8/10 stars |
| One Thirty BPM | (5.2/10) |
| Rolling Stone | 2.5/5 stars |
| Spin | 3/5 stars |
| Toro | 4.5/5 stars |
| Classic Rock | 8/10 stars |
| Pitchfork | (3.6/10) |

In 2014, drownedinsound.com called the album "a masterclass in crafted repose – repeated listens and time spent in its company yielding considerable reward". While Uncut was less impressed: "Midlake's secret is out: they're highly skilled dilettantes, attempting to master a different genre on each album just to give themselves a challenge. That's no crime in itself, and it beats making the same record over and over again, but it may explain the gaping hole at the heart of this strangely frigid album". And Tinymixtapes called it "the first great record of 2010, though one that admittedly requires a little adjusting... I’m not going to say that opener “Acts of Man” — with songwriter Tim Smith's lyric “When all the newness of gold/ Travels far from where anyone’s been/ More like the earth/ Over years” lilting over plucked acoustic guitars and skittering snare — isn't a little ridiculous; the kind of pompous, overblown rock poetry that punk was supposed to have killed. But I'll argue that it serves as an appropriate disclaimer for the album: If you engage in the alien nomenclature — the way most of us have to when we listen to, say, Lil Wayne or Sun Ra — you're in for an incredible listen."

== Track listing ==
All songs written by Tim Smith.

| No. | Title | Length |
|---|---|---|
| 1. | "Acts of Man" | 2:55 |
| 2. | "Winter Dies" | 5:04 |
| 3. | "Small Mountain" | 3:39 |
| 4. | "Core of Nature" | 4:29 |
| 5. | "Fortune" | 2:05 |
| 6. | "Rulers, Ruling All Things" | 4:22 |
| 7. | "Children of the Grounds" | 3:55 |
| 8. | "Bring Down" | 3:37 |
| 9. | "The Horn" | 4:07 |
| 10. | "The Courage of Others" | 3:17 |
| 11. | "In the Ground" | 4:15 |
| Total length: | | 41:45 |

Japan edition bonus track
| No. | Title | Length |
|---|---|---|
| 12. | "Rose of Dawn" | 3:01 |
| Total length: | | 44:52 |

== Personnel ==
Midlake

- Tim Smith – vocals, acoustic guitar, flute, recorder, piano, keyboards
- Eric Pulido – guitars, dulcimer, autoharp, percussion, backing vocals
- Paul Alexander – bass, electric guitar, bassoon
- McKenzie Smith – drums, percussion
- Eric Nichelson – guitars, autoharp, percussion

Other musicians

- Max Townsley – electric guitar
- Jesse Chandler – harpsichord
- Fiona Brice – violin
- Stephanie Dosen – harmony vocals on "Bring Down"

== Charts ==
Chart performance for The Courage of Others
| Chart (2010) | Peak position |
|---|---|
| Australian Albums (ARIA) | 61 |
| Belgian Albums (Ultratop Flanders) | 21 |
| Belgian Albums (Ultratop Wallonia) | 62 |
| Dutch Albums (Album Top 100) | 31 |
| French Albums (SNEP) | 27 |
| German Albums (Offizielle Top 100) | 96 |
| Norwegian Albums (VG-lista) | 30 |
| Swedish Albums (Sverigetopplistan) | 15 |
| UK Albums (OCC) | 18 |
| US Billboard 200 | 94 |
