= Show You the Way to Go =

1977 single by The Jacksons

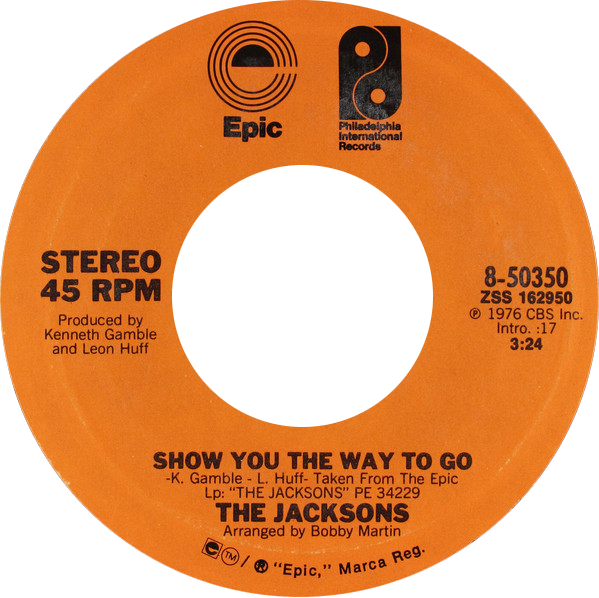
- Side A of US vinyl single

Single by the Jacksons

from the album The Jacksons
- B-side: "Blues Away"
- Released: March 1977
- Recorded: 1976
- Studio: Sigma Sound, Philadelphia, Pennsylvania
- Genre: Philadelphia soul; R&B
- Length: 3:24 Single/5:30 LP Version
- Label: Epic; PIR
- Songwriter: Gamble and Huff
- Producers: Gamble and Huff

The Jacksons singles chronology
| "Enjoy Yourself" (1976) | "Show You the Way to Go" (1977) | "Goin' Places" (1977) |

"Show You the Way to Go" is a song written by Gamble and Huff and recorded by the Jacksons for their 1976 CBS debut album, The Jacksons. Released as a single in early 1977, it was the only number-one song for the group in the UK. It was later covered by Dannii Minogue in 1992.

== Background ==
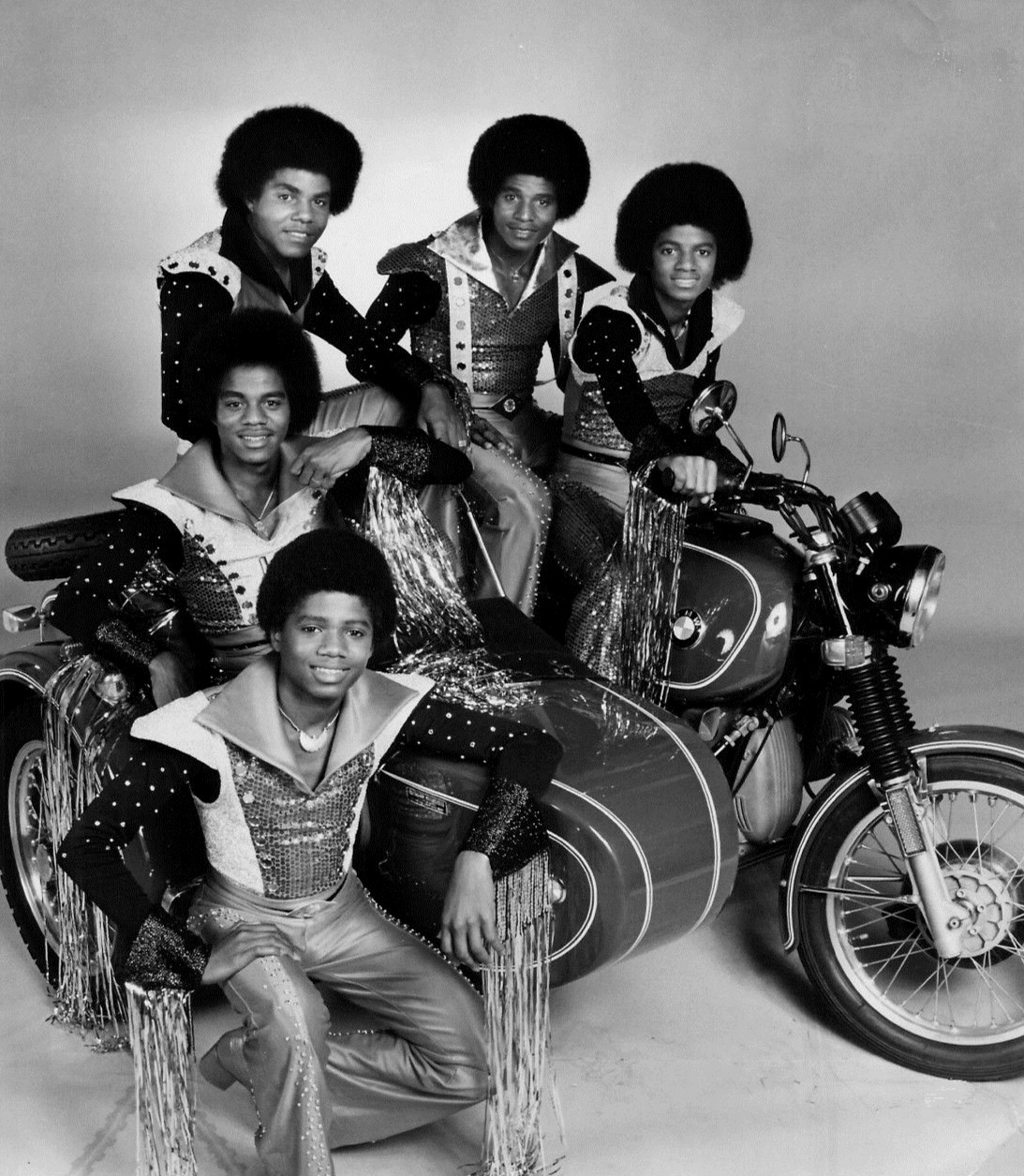
The Jacksons in 1977

"Show You the Way to Go" became a hit for the Jacksons, (formerly known as "The Jackson 5") after their departure from Motown nearly two years prior. The move made it easy for the brothers to write and produce their own material. They spent a couple of years under the production and direction of Gamble and Huff and were signed to Philadelphia International Records. This was one of the songs that the producers wrote for the brothers.

This song was released after "Enjoy Yourself," released less than 5 months earlier in October 1976. Michael sang lead and background vocals. Marlon Jackson, and the rest of the brothers (Randy having replaced Jermaine) had backup parts. The song reached No. 6 US Billboard R&B chart, No. 28 US Billboard Hot 100 and No. 1 on the UK Singles Chart. After recording the album Goin' Places in 1977, the Jacksons left Philadelphia International for Epic.

Record World called it "a smooth ballad" and said "There's only one way for this one to go, and that's up the chart."

The single's B-side was "Blues Away", which was the first song Michael Jackson wrote entirely himself.

== Charts ==
=== Weekly charts ===
| Chart (1977) | Peak position |
|---|---|
| Canada Top Singles (RPM) | 52 |
| Ireland (IRMA) | 5 |
| UK Singles (OCC) | 1 |
| US Billboard Hot 100 | 28 |
| US R&B (Billboard) | 6 |
| US Cash Box Top 100 | 45 |

=== Year-end charts ===
| Chart (1977) | Position |
|---|---|
| UK Singles (OCC) | 28 |
| US Billboard Hot 100 | 171 |

=== Personnel ===
- Lead vocals by Michael Jackson
- Background vocals by Michael Jackson, Tito Jackson, Marlon Jackson, Jackie Jackson and Randy Jackson
- Instruments by Tito Jackson, Randy Jackson, MFSB

== Certifications ==
| Region | Certification | Certified units/sales |
|---|---|---|
| United Kingdom (BPI) | Silver | 250,000^{^} |
^{^} Shipments figures based on certification alone.

== Dannii Minogue version ==
"Show You the Way to Go"

Single by Dannii Minogue

from the album Get into You
- Released: July 20, 1992
- Genre: R&B; dance-pop
- Length: 4:21
- Label: Mushroom; MCA
- Songwriters: Kenny Gamble; Leon Huff
- Producers: Bruce Forest; Andy Whitmore

Dannii Minogue singles chronology
| "I Don't Wanna Take This Pain" (1991) | "Show You the Way to Go" (1992) | "Love's on Every Corner" (1992) |

Australian singer Dannii Minogue's version of "Show You the Way to Go" was produced by Bruce Forest and Andy Whitmore and was the first single released from her second album, Get into You (1993). In 1992, it appeared on the NME charity album Ruby Trax, before being remixed and released as a single, reaching No. 30 on the UK Singles Chart in August of that year.

=== Critical reception ===
Larry Flick from Billboard magazine named "Show You the Way to Go" "her strongest single to date", noting that it "sports a rich, soul-splashed house groove and a nicely matured vocal by Dannii." Alan Jones from Music Week described the song as "bright, breezy and inconsequential". Andrew Perry from Select said it was "an especially lifeless cover".

=== Track listings ===
- UK CD single
1. "Show You the Way to Go" (7-inch version)
2. "Success" (E-Smoove Groovy 12-inch)
3. "Show You the Way to Go" (extended version)
4. "Success" (Maurice's dub)
- Australian cassette single (C16040)
1. "Show You the Way to Go" (7-inch version)
2. "Success" (E-Smoove Groovy 12-inch)
- Australian CD single (D16040)
1. "Show You the Way to Go" (7-inch version)
2. "Success" (E-Smoove Groovy 12-inch)
3. "Show You the Way to Go" (extended version)
- UK cassette single
1. "Show You the Way to Go" (7-inch version)
2. "Show You the Way to Go" (dub)
- Ruby Trax (Disc one, track 9)
1. "Show You the Way to Go" (Eron Irving Remix)

=== Charts ===
| Chart (1992) | Peak position |
|---|---|
| Australia (ARIA) | 104 |
| UK Singles (Official Charts) | 30 |
| UK Airplay (Music Week) | 39 |
| UK Dance (Music Week) | 38 |

=== Release history ===
| Region | Date | Format(s) | Label(s) | Ref. |
|---|---|---|---|---|
| United Kingdom | July 20, 1992 | 7-inch vinyl; 12-inch vinyl; CD; cassette | MCA | |
| Australia | September 7, 1992 | 12-inch vinyl; CD; cassette | Mushroom | |
| Japan | October 21, 1992 | CD | Alfa International | |

== Other sources ==
- "Dannii.com". Comprehensive listing of all Dannii Minogue releases and song information. Archived from the original on May 14, 2006.
- "DanniiMusic.com". Comprehensive listing of all Dannii Minogue releases, including commercial and promo items.
