= Bread, Love and Dreams (band) =

British folk group

Bread, Love and Dreams was a British folk group who released three albums between 1969 and 1971.

Bread, Love and Dreams comprised two females and one male, all of whom sang. Their second album featured guest appearances from Danny Thompson and Terry Cox, of Pentangle.

David McNiven also contributed clarinet and lyrics to the Prog rock group The Human Beast. He died on 18 December 2015.

== Members ==
- David McNiven
- Angie Rew
- Carolyn Davis

== Discography ==
- Bread, Love and Dreams (London Records, 1969)
- The Strange Tale of Captain Shannon and the Hunchback from Gigha (Decca Records, 1970)
- Amaryllis (Decca Records, 1971)
