= This Is It (Melba Moore song) =

1976 single by Melba Moore

Single by Melba Moore

from the album This Is It
- Released: 1976
- Recorded: Early 1976
- Genre: Disco
- Length: 3:31 (album/single version); 4:43 (12-inch version)
- Label: Buddah
- Songwriter: Van McCoy
- Producer: Van McCoy

Melba Moore singles chronology
"Must Be Dues" (1975)	"This Is It" (1976)	"Lean On Me" (1976)

"This Is It" is a 1976 disco song written by Van McCoy, and performed by American singer and actress Melba Moore for her fifth album, This Is It (1976).

== Background ==
Melba Moore would give credit to her husband/manager Charles Huggins, whom she married in September 1974, with getting her signed to Buddah Records in 1975 — ending a four-year recording studio absence — and with arranging for veteran soul music songwriter/producer Van McCoy to helm Moore's second Buddah album release, which she began recording in January 1976. The recruitment of McCoy to helm Moore's album was essentially due to McCoy's success as a producer of disco records, it being hoped that a disco hit would consolidate the somewhat nebulous success Moore had to that point experienced as a recording artist: (Melba Moore quote:)"I just couldn't ignore the [impact] that disco was having on music".

The album's disco-oriented title track was released in March 1976 and became a discothèque favorite: while the "This Is It" single did afford Moore her first major R&B hit, reaching No. 18 on the US Billboard ranking of R&B singles the track failed to provide her with the desired Pop music breakout. According to the Disco Reviews article by Tom Lewis and Keith Mann in RMR Weekly, issue no. March 26, 1979, the song's instant success on the dance floor and low success on the Hot 100 was to do with the success of the disco phenomenon. Disco exposure can result in good sales even without airplay. It didn't get any higher than No. 91 on the Billboard Hot 100 ("This Is It" did become a Top Ten hit on the singles chart for the United Kingdom).

== Charts ==
Chart (1976)	Peak position
Sweden (Topplistan)	19
UK Singles (OCC)	9
US Billboard Hot 100	91
US Disco Action (Billboard)	10
US Hot Soul Singles (Billboard)	18

== Dannii Minogue version ==
"This Is It"

Single by Dannii Minogue

from the album Get into You
- Released: July 5, 1993
- Genre: Dance-pop; house
- Length: 3:40
- Label: Mushroom; MCA; Radikal
- Songwriter: Van McCoy
- Producers: Tim Lever; Mike Percy

Dannii Minogue singles chronology
"Love's on Every Corner" (1992)	"This Is It" (1993)	"This Is the Way" (1993)

Music video
- "This Is It" on YouTube

"This Is It" was covered in 1993 by Australian singer Dannii Minogue on her second album, Get into You (1993). The single was produced by Tim Lever and Mike Percy and was released in July 1993. It received a generally positive reception from music critics. The accompanying music video was directed by Willy Smax and filmed in Los Angeles.

=== Release ===
"This Is It" was released as the album's third single on July 5, 1993, in the United Kingdom. The song reached the top 10 on the UK Singles Chart, becoming Minogue's third top-10 single. In Australia, it reached the top 20 and became an airplay hit earning a gold certification. Despite missing the top 10, the single spent twenty weeks in the ARIA top 50 and was the forty-third highest selling single of the year, the third-highest for an Australian artist. Along with the single "Get into You", the song was chosen to be released in Canada and the USA. The single was also featured in the second volume of the Dance Mix USA series, which used the "Dannii Got Murked" remix. This version of the song was used by Network Ten in their idents.

=== Critical reception ===
Larry Flick from Billboard magazine wrote, "Vivacious and charming Minogue takes another stab at transferring her European success to the States with an earnest reading of a disco nugget made famous by Melba Moore. She skips and spins atop a throbbing beat foundation, swerving around a flurry of chirping background vocals, grand piano lines, and fluttering strings." Caroline Sullivan from The Guardian said in her review of the Get into You album, "Two seventies covers, Melba Moore's 'This Is It' and an authoritative take on the Jacksons' 'Show You the Way to Go', are the big moments, all clattering drum machines and Barry White-ish swooning strings."

In his weekly UK chart commentary, James Masterton noted that Dannii's last UK Top 10 hit was her cover of "Jump to the Beat", adding that it "may bode well for this cover". A reviewer from Music & Media commented, "Little sister is wearing big sister's clothes, and they are tight fit for the first time with this cheerful pop/dance song". Alan Jones from Music Week gave the song three out of five, describing it as a "house-inflicted but otherwise faithful remake" and a "typically breezy Minogue single". He felt that "the chart is overloaded with disco-era remakes, so it's hard to see it matching Moore's number nine peak."

=== Music video ===
The music video for "This Is It" was filmed in Los Angeles and was directed by Willy Smax. It features Minogue and her then-boyfriend actor Julian McMahon on a beach. The video was a Box Top on British music television channel The Box in January 1994. The dance routine was choreographed by Minogue. It also features an appearance from American actress Elise Neal, who later starred in the horror movie Scream 2 alongside Neve Campbell and the Lifetime made-for-television movie Aaliyah: The Princess of R&B in the role of Gladys Knight. It was listed in NME's "50 Worst Music Videos". The Australian sketch comedy series The Late Show parodied the music video in episode 14 of the show's second season; titled "Holy Shit," the parody featured Jane Kennedy as Minogue and Jason Stephens as McMahon.

=== Track listings and formats ===
- Australian CD single (D11390)
1. "This Is It" (7-inch version)
2. "This Is It" (12-inch extended version)
3. "This Is It" (alternative 12-inch mix)
4. "This Is It" (Dannii Got Murked mix)
5. "This Is It" (Miami Heat mix)
6. "This Is It" (One World 12-inch mix)
7. "This Is It" (a capella version)
- Australian cassette single (C11390)
1. "This Is It"
2. "It's Time to Move On"
- CD single
1. "This Is It" (7-inch version)
2. "This Is It" (12-inch extended version)
3. "This Is It" (alternative 12-inch mix)
4. "This Is It" (Dannii Got Murked mix)
5. "This Is It" (Miami Heat mix)
6. "This Is It (One World 12-inch mix)
7. "This Is It" (a capella version)
- UK vinyl single
1. "This Is It" (Dannii Got Murked mix)
2. "This Is It" (12-inch extended version)
3. "This Is It" (Miami Heat mix)This Is It (Vapour Rub dub)
4. "This Is It" (a cappella version)
- North American CD single
1. "This Is It" (Dannii Got Murked mix)
2. "This Is It" (Extended version)
3. "This Is It" (Doc & Freestyle remix)
4. "This Is It" (Vapour Rub dub)
5. "This Is It" (alternative mix)
6. "This Is It" (Miami Heat mix)
- Cassette single and 7-inch vinyl
1. "This Is It" (7-inch version)
2. "It's Time to Move On"

Notes: "It's Time to Move On", was a B-side released for the Get into You album and is only found on the cassette single and 7-inch vinyl. For the North American CD, the tracks received a remaster.

=== Charts ===
==== Weekly charts ====
Chart (1993)	Peak position
Australia (ARIA)	13
Europe (Eurochart Hot 100)	36
Iceland (Íslenski Listinn Topp 40)	32
Ireland (IRMA)	17
Israel (Israeli Singles Chart)	3
UK Singles (Official Charts)	10
UK Airplay (ERA)	41
UK Dance (Music Week)	10
UK Club Chart (Music Week)	87

==== Year-end charts ====
Chart (1993)	Position
Australia (ARIA)	43
UK Singles (OCC)	78

=== Release history ===
Region	Date	Format(s)	Label(s)	Ref.
United Kingdom	July 5, 1993	7-inch vinyl; 12-inch vinyl; CD; cassette	MCA	
Japan	October 21, 1993	CD	Alfa	

== Other covers ==
- In 1990 British singer Ruth Campbell released a cover which was also released in Australia one year prior to Dannii Minogue's version
- A Dutch-language rendering entitled "Jij En Ik" was recorded by Petra for her 1997 album Petra.
