= Melba Moore =

American singer and actress (born 1945)

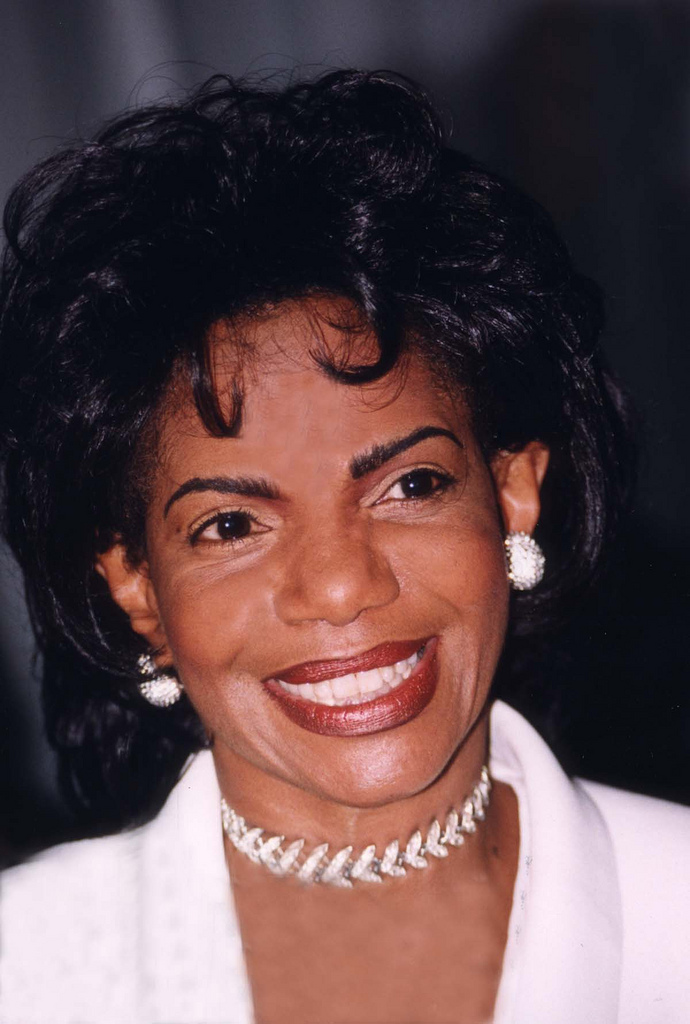
- Moore in 1999
- Born: Beatrice Melba Smith; October 29, 1945 (age 81); New York City, U.S.
- Occupations: Actress; singer
- Years active: 1966–present
- Spouse: Charles Huggins (m. 1974; div. 1991)
- Children: 1
- Musical career
- Genres: R&B; soul; disco; gospel
- Instrument: Vocals
- Labels: Mercury; Buddah; Epic; Capitol
- Website: Official website

Beatrice Melba Smith (born October 29, 1945), known by her stage name Melba Moore, is an American singer and actress.

== Biography ==
=== Early life and education ===
Moore was born Beatrice Melba Smith on October 29, 1945, in New York City to Gertrude Melba Smith (1920–1976), who was a singer professionally known as Bonnie Davis, and Teddy Hill (1909–1978), a big band leader. Moore grew up in the Harlem section of New York until age nine, when her mother remarried, to jazz pianist Clement Leroy Moorman and the family relocated to Newark, New Jersey. For high school, Moore attended Newark Arts High School, graduating in 1958. In 1970, she graduated from Montclair State College with a BA in music.

=== Early career ===
Moore began her recording career in 1967, cutting the track "Magic Touch", written by Ted Daryll, which was left unreleased until 1986. In later years, it became a popular track on the Northern soul scene, eventually leading to Moore’s performing it live in 2009 at the Baltic Soul Weekender 3 in Germany, north of Hamburg. In 1967, she began her performing career as Dionne in the original cast of the musical Hair, along with Ronnie Dyson, Paul Jabara, and Diane Keaton. Moore replaced Keaton in the role of Sheila.

In 1970, Moore won a Tony Award for Best Performance by a Featured Actress in a Musical for her portrayal of Lutiebelle in Purlie, a role she would later reprise in the 1981 television adaptation for Showtime.

Moore did not return to Broadway until 1978, when she appeared (as Marsinah) with Eartha Kitt in Timbuktu! but left the show after a few weeks and was replaced by Vanessa Shaw.

Following the success of Purlie, Moore landed two big-screen film roles, released two successful albums, 1970's I Got Love and Look What You're Doing to the Man, and co-starred with actor Clifton Davis in the then-couple's own successful variety television series in 1972. Both Moore and Davis revealed that the show was canceled after its brief run when their relationship ended. When Moore's managers and accountants left her in 1973, she returned to Newark and began singing at benefit concerts. Her career picked up after she met record manager and business promoter Charles Huggins after a performance at the Apollo Theater in 1974.

=== Music career ===
In 1975, Moore signed with Buddah Records and released the critically successful R&B album Peach Melba, which included the minor hit "I Am His Lady". The following year, she scored her first significant hit with the Van McCoy-penned "This Is It", which reached the Billboard Hot 100, the top-20 position on the R&B chart, and top-10 in the UK Singles Chart, and became her biggest success in that country. "This is It" also became the number 1 disco track in the UK for that year. Eighteen years later Australian singer Dannii Minogue covered this song, which this time made it to number 10 on the ARIA chart.

In 1976, she scored her third Grammy nomination with the R&B ballad "Lean on Me", which had been originally recorded by Vivian Reed and later by Aretha Franklin, who recorded the song as a B-side of her 1971 hit "Spanish Harlem". The song is notable for Moore's extended long note at the end. In 1983, she re-recorded the song as a tribute to McCoy, who had penned the song and had died four years earlier. Throughout the rest of the 1970s, Moore struggled to match the success of "This Is It" with minor R&B/dance hits. However, her hit 'Pick Me Up, I'll Dance' released in May 1979, produced by McFadden & Whitehead and released on Epic Records, did have considerable UK disco success, reaching UK chart position 48. She had another hit that same year, also produced by McFadden & Whitehead: a cover version of the Bee Gees' hit "You Stepped into My Life", which reached the top 20 on the R&B charts and 47 on the Billboard Hot 100.

In 1982, Moore signed with Capitol Records and reached the top 5 on the R&B charts with the dance-pop/funk single "Love's Comin' at Ya", which also hit the top 20 in the UK (on EMI America EA 146) and became a sizable hit in some European countries for its post-disco sound, followed by "Mind Up Tonight", which was another top 40 hit in the UK, reaching position number 22. A string of R&B hits followed, including 1983's "Keepin' My Lover Satisfied" and "Love Me Right", 1984's "Livin' For Your Love", 1985's "Read My Lips"—which later earned Moore a third Grammy nomination (for Best Female Rock Vocal Performance), making her just the fourth black artist after Donna Summer, Michael Jackson and Tina Turner to be nominated in the rock category—and 1985's "When You Love Me Like This".

In 1986, she scored two number 1 R&B hits, including the duet "A Little Bit More" with Freddie Jackson and "Falling". She scored other popular R&B hits including "Love the One I'm With (A Lot of Love)" and "It's Been So Long". That same year, Moore also headlined the CBS television sitcom Melba; its debut aired the same night as the Challenger explosion, and the show was abruptly cancelled, though five episodes aired that summer. Her success began to wane as the decade closed, although she managed two further Top 10 R&B hits, "Do You Really (Want My Love)" and "Lift Every Voice and Sing". Moore had a starring role in the 1990 horror film Def by Temptation.

=== Later career ===
Moore returned to Broadway in 1995, landing a part in Les Misérables. A year later, she started her long-running one-woman show, Sweet Songs of the Soul, later renamed I'm Still Standing. In 2003, Moore was featured in the film The Fighting Temptations, which starred Cuba Gooding Jr. and Beyoncé Knowles. In 2007, she landed a role in a production of Ain't Misbehavin'. In 2009, independent label Breaking Records released the EP Book of Dreams, in which Moore was featured. That same year, Moore told her life story on TV-One's Unsung, and later that year, she released her first R&B album in nearly 20 years, a duet with Phil Perry called The Gift of Love. Her song "Love Is" debuted on the R&B charts in 2011 at number 87.

In 2016, Moore released the album Forever Moore. Moore has continued to tour and perform since then, releasing her album The Day I Turned To You on December 13, 2019 – an album of R&B-inflected gospel music.

In 2021, Moore collaborated with Stone Foundation on the song "Now That You Want Me Back".

In 2022, Moore performed in Washington, D.C., in Roll On, a gospel musical that originally opened with her in 2006.

== Personal life ==
Moore has been married once and has a daughter. Moore was engaged in a four-year relationship with television star Clifton Davis during the early 1970s. Davis later admitted that the relationship failed due to his drug abuse and mistreatment of Moore. In September 1974, Moore married record manager and business promoter Charles Huggins. Moore and Huggins divorced after 17 years of marriage in 1991. In 1999, Huggins filed suit against Moore, claiming that she had publicly defamed him by stating that he abused her economically.

Moore has described herself as a "born-again Catholic".

== Accolades ==
In addition to her 1970 Tony Award for Best Performance by a Featured Actress in a Musical for her portrayal of Lutiebelle in Purlie, Moore's music career brought additional accolades. She was nominated for a Grammy Award in 1971 for Best New Artist. In 1976, she earned another Grammy nomination for Best Rhythm & Blues Vocal Performance - Female for the song "Lean on Me". Moore was nominated again for Best Female Rock Vocal Performance in 1986 for "Read My Lips".

Moore was the 2012 Recipient of the Atlanta Black Theatre Festival Theatre Legend Award. She was inducted into the National Rhythm & Blues Hall of Fame on October 4, 2015, in Detroit.

On August 10, 2023, Moore received a star on the Hollywood Walk of Fame within the Live Theatre/Live Performance category.

On April 27, 2026, Moore was inducted into the Atlantic City Walk of Fame presented by, The National R&B Music Society. Former WBLS radio personality Debi B. inducted her. Tavares, Sister Sledge, Billy Paul, Black Ivory and Roy Ayers were also inducted as part of the 2026 Class.

== Stage work ==
- History of the Negro People (mini series) (1965)
- Hair (1967)
- Purlie (1970)
- Timbuktu! (1978)
- Inacent Black (1981)
- Broadway at the Bowl (1988)
- From the Mississippi Delta (1993, est)
- Les Misérables (1995)
- Brooklyn (2006)
- Roll On (2006, 2022)
- Straight 2the Head (2013)
- Great God A'Mighty (2013)
- Lady Day at Emerson's Bar and Grill (2018)
- After Midnight (2018)

== Filmography ==
- Cotton Comes to Harlem (1970) – Singer at the Apollo Theater (uncredited)
- The Sidelong Glances of a Pigeon Kicker (1970) – Model at Party
- Lost in the Stars (1974) – Irina
- The Doctors (1978) as herself on the March 20th episode performing "I got Love" & "Stranger in Paradise"
- The Love Boat (1979) as Claudette Plummer on the 14th episode of the 3rd season, The Stimulation of Stephanie/The Next Step/ Life Begins at 40
- Charlotte Forten’s Mission (1985) – Charlotte Forten
- Christmas with Flicka (1987) – Herself
- All Dogs Go to Heaven (1989) – Whippet Angel (named Annabelle in later installments) (voice)
- Yakety Yak, Take It Back (1991) – Herself and Tibi the Take it Back Butterfly (voice)
- The Fighting Temptations (2003) – Bessie Cooley

== Discography ==
=== Albums ===
Year	Album	Chart positions	
Year	Album	US	US R&B
1970	I Got Love: Released: June 9, 1970; Label: Mercury	—	—
1971	Look What You're Doing to the Man: Released: January 29, 1971; Label: Mercury	157	43
1972	Melba Moore Live!: Released: July 21, 1972; Label: Mercury	—	—
1975	Peach Melba: Released: June 10, 1975; Label: Buddah	176	49
1976	This Is It: Released: April 13, 1976; Label: Buddah	145	32
1976	Melba '76: Released: December 2, 1976; Label: Buddah	177	30
1977	A Portrait of Melba: Released: November 6, 1977; Label: Buddah	—	—
1978	Melba '78: Released: September 29, 1978; Label: Epic	114	35
1979	Burn: Released: September 21, 1979; Label: Epic	—	71
1980	Closer: Released: July 20, 1980; Label: Epic	—	—
1981	What a Woman Needs: Released: October 12, 1981; Label: EMI America	201	46
1982	The Other Side of the Rainbow: Released: October 10, 1982; Label: Capitol	152	18
1983	Never Say Never: Released: November 14, 1983; Label: Capitol	147	9
1985	Read My Lips: Released: March 22, 1985; Label: Capitol	130	30
1986	A Lot of Love: Released: July 18, 1986; Label: Capitol	91	7
1988	I'm in Love: Released: June 1, 1988; Label: Capitol	—	45
1990	Soul Exposed: Released: March 26, 1990; Label: Orpheus / Capitol	—	52
1996	Happy Together (with The Lafayette Harris, Jr. Trio): Released: June 18, 1996; Label: Muse	—	—
1999	Solitary Journey: Released: February 23, 1999; Label: Encore Music Group	—	—
2001	A Very Special Christmas Gift: Released: October 23, 2001; Label: Believe Music Works / Lightyear	—	—
2002	A Night in St. Lucia: Released: June 25, 2002; Label: Image	—	—
2003	I'm Still Here: Released: February 25, 2003; Label: Shout Glory	—	—
2004	Nobody but Jesus: Released: August 31, 2004; Label: Believe Music Works / Lightyear	—	—
2007	Live in Concert: Released: August 7, 2007; Label: Soul Concerts	—	—
2009	The Gift of Love (with Phil Perry): Released: September 29, 2009; Label: Shanachie	—	—
2016	Forever Moore: Released: April 10, 2016; Label: Muzikk Matrixx	—	—
2019	The Day I Turned to You: Released: December 13, 2019; Label: Hitman Records	—	—
2022	Imagine: Released: April 29, 2022; Label: The Gallery Entertainment / Orpheus Enterprises	—	—
"—" denotes releases that did not chart or were not released in that territory.

=== Compilations ===
Year	Album
1979	Dancin' with Melba: Released: 1979; Label: Buddah
1995	This Is It: The Best of Melba Moore: Released: March 21, 1995; Label: CEMA / Razor & Tie
1997	The Magic of Melba Moore (A Little Bit Moore): Released: January 28, 1997; Label: EMI

=== Singles ===
Year	Single (A-side, B-side) Both sides from same album except where indicated	Chart positions				Album
Year	Single (A-side, B-side) Both sides from same album except where indicated	US	US R&B	US Dance	UK	Album
1966	"Don't Cry Sing Along with the Music" b/w "Does Love Believe in Me"	—	—	—	—	Non-album tracks
1969	"I Messed Up a Good Thing" b/w "I'll Do It All Over Again" (Non-album track)	—	—	—	—	Living to Give
1969	"We're Living to Give (To Give to Each Other)" b/w "The Flesh Failures (Let the Sun Shine In)"	—	—	—	—	Living to Give
1970	"Black Enough" b/w "My Salvation"	—	—	—	—	Cotton Comes to Harlem various artists soundtrack
1970	"Time and Love" b/w "Facade"	—	—	—	—	Living to Give
1970	"I Got Love" b/w "I Love Making Love to You" (from Living to Give)	111	—	—	—	I Got Love
1970	"We're Living to Give (To Give to Each Other)" b/w "Purlie" (from I Got Love)	—	—	—	—	Living to Give
1970	"Look What You're Doing to the Man" b/w "Patience Is Rewarded"	—	—	—	—	Look What You're Doing to the Man
1971	"Loving You Comes So Easy" b/w "If I Had a Million"	—	—	—	—	Look What You're Doing to the Man
1971	"Take Up a Course in Happiness" b/w "He Ain't Heavy, He's My Brother" (from Look What You're Doing to the Man)	—	—	—	—	Non-album tracks
1972	"I Ain't Got to Love Nobody Else" b/w "Love Letters"	—	—	—	—	Non-album tracks
1975	"I Am His Lady" b/w "If I Lose"	—	82	—	—	Peach Melba
1975	"Must Be Dues" b/w "Natural Part of Everything"	—	—	—	—	Peach Melba
1976	"This Is It" b/w "Stay Awhile"	91	18	10	9	This Is It
1976	"Lean on Me" b/w "One Less Morning"	—	17	—	—	This Is It
1976	"Free"	—	—	14	—	Dancin' with Melba
1976	"Make Me Believe in You"	—	—	6	—	Dancin' with Melba
1976	"Play Boy Scout"	—	—	14	—	Dancin' with Melba
1977	"Good Love Makes Everything Alright"	—	—	36	—	Melba (Buddah)
1977	"The Long and Winding Road" b/w "Ain't No Love Lost"	—	94	—	—	Melba (Buddah)
1977	"The Way You Make Me Feel" b/w "So Many Mountains"	108	62	—	—	Melba (Buddah)
1977	"The Greatest Feeling" b/w "The Long and Winding Road"; UK release only	—	—	—	—	Melba (Buddah)
1978	"Standing Right Here" b/w "Living Free"	—	69	53	—	A Portrait of Melba
1978	"I Don't Know No One Else to Turn To" b/w "Just Another Link"	—	—	—	—	A Portrait of Melba
1978	"You Stepped into My Life" b/w "There's No Other Like You"	47	17	5	—	Melba (Epic)
1979	"Pick Me Up, I'll Dance" b/w "Where Did You Ever Go"	103	85	22	48	Melba (Epic)
1979	"Miss Thing" b/w "Need Love"	—	90	41	—	Burn
1979	"Night People" b/w "Hot and Tasty"	—	—	—	—	Burn
1980	"Everything So Good About You" b/w "Next to You"	—	47	—	—	Closer
1981	"Take My Love" ^{1} b/w "Just You, Just Me" (Non-album track)	—	15	12	—	What a Woman Needs
1981	"Let's Stand Together" ^{1} b/w "What a Woman Needs"	—	44	12	—	What a Woman Needs
1982	"Love's Comin' at Ya" b/w Instrumental version of A-side (Non-album track)	104	5	2	15	The Other Side of the Rainbow
1983	"Mind Up Tonight" b/w The other side of the rainbow	—	25	17	22	The Other Side of the Rainbow
1983	"Underlove" b/w "Underlove" (M&M mix, non-album track)	—	35	42	60	The Other Side of the Rainbow
1983	"Keepin' My Lover Satisfied" b/w Instrumental version of A-side (Non-album track)	—	14	57	—	Never Say Never
1984	"Livin' for Your Love" b/w "Got to Have Your Love" (Instrumental version, non-album track)	108	6	—	—	Never Say Never
1984	"Love Me Right" b/w "Never Say Never"	—	15	—	—	Never Say Never
1985	"I Can't Believe (It's Over)" b/w "King of My Heart"	—	29	—	—	Read My Lips
1985	"Read My Lips" b/w "Got to Have Your Love" (from Never Say Never)	104	12	—	—	Read My Lips
1985	"When You Love Me Like This" b/w "Winner" (Edited instrumental, non-album track)	106	14	—	—	Read My Lips
1986	"Love the One I'm With (A Lot of Love)" (with Kashif) b/w "Don't Go Away"	—	5	—	—	A Lot of Love
1986	"A Little Bit More" (with Freddie Jackson) b/w "When We Touch (It's Like Fire)"	—	1	—	96	A Lot of Love
1986	"Falling" b/w "Got to Have Your Love" (from Never Say Never)	—	1	—	—	A Lot of Love
1987	"I'm Not Gonna Let You Go" b/w "Dreams"	—	26	—	—	A Lot of Love
1987	"It's Been So Long" b/w "Don't Go Away"	—	6	—	—	A Lot of Love
1988	"I Can't Complain" (with Freddie Jackson) b/w "There I Go Falling In Love Again" (from A Lot of Love)	—	12	—	—	I'm in Love
1988	"I'm in Love" (with Kashif) b/w "Stay" (from A Lot of Love)	—	13	—	—	I'm in Love
1988	"Love & Kisses" b/w "I'm in Love" (Summertime Shorts version, with Kashif—non-album track)	—	68	—	—	I'm in Love
1990	"Do You Really (Want My Love?)"; 12" single with four different mixes Only the original version appears on the album	—	10	39	93	Soul Exposed
1990	"Lift Ev'ry Voice and Sing" b/w Same song with narration by Rev. Jesse Jackson (Non-album track)	—	9	—	—	Soul Exposed
1998	"Everybody"; CD single with five different mixes	—	—	—	—	Solitary Journey (Featuring three of the five mixes)
2005	"My Heart Belongs to You"; 12" single with three different mixes	—	—	—	—	Non-album track
2010	"Love Is"	—	87	—	—	Non-album track
2015	"Fallen From Grace"	—	—	—	—	Non-album track
2016	"How Sweet It Is"	—	—	—	—	Forever Moore
2016	"What Can I Do To Survive"	—	—	—	—	Non-album track
2017	"Searching" (w / Antonio McLendon)	—	—	—	—	Non-album track
2023	"It Seems To Hang On"	—	—	—	—	Imagine
2025	"No Filter" (with Terry Hunter)	—	—	—	—	Non-album track
2026	"Love Wins Every Time"	—	—	—	1	Non-album track
"—" denotes releases that did not chart or were not released in that territory.

- ^1 "Let's Stand Together" and "Take My Love" charted together on the US Billboard Dance chart, but charted separately elsewhere.

== See also ==
- List of disco artists (L-R)
- List of post-disco artists and songs
- Guests on Soul Train
- List of performers on Top of the Pops
- List of Broadway musicals stars
- List of artists who reached number one on the Billboard R&B chart
