= Antiphon (album) =

Studio album by Midlake
- Released: November 4, 2013
- Genre: Psychedelic folk, indie rock
- Length: 43:35
- Label: ATO (US); Bella Union (EU)

Midlake chronology
The Courage of Others (2010)	Antiphon (2013)	For the Sake of Bethel Woods (2022)

Professional ratings
Review scores
Source	Rating
AllMusic	4/5 stars
Clash	9/10 stars
The Guardian	4/5 stars
Mojo	4/5 stars

Antiphon is the fourth studio album by American folk rock band Midlake, released on November 5, 2013, on Bella Union Records, in Europe, and ATO Records in North America. Recorded following the departure of vocalist, guitarist and primary songwriter Tim Smith, Antiphon is the first album to feature guitarist Eric Pulido on lead vocals, alongside new members Jesse Chandler (keyboards, flute) and Joey McClellan (guitar).

Released to critical acclaim, the album reached number 39 on the UK Albums Chart.

== Background and recording ==
In November 2012, vocalist, guitarist and primary songwriter Tim Smith departed from Midlake, in the midst of recording a fourth studio album. Following his departure, guitarist and backing vocalist Eric Pulido occupied his vacated role, noting, "We understood this band couldn’t offer Tim what he wanted... that he needed to do his own thing." Upon his departure, Smith offered to split the recorded material with both the band and himself, however, Pulido noted, "Of what we’d recorded, Tim had said, 'You can have this,' but what we couldn’t take with us turned out to be seventy-five per cent of the recording."

The remaining members opted to start anew, recording Antiphon in six months. Pulido noted, "There were some growing pains, I won't lie. Obviously, when your singer-songwriter leaves, there's some transition that takes place. But we bonded together in a way that we had never done before." The subsequent writing and recording sessions found the band working in a more democratic and spontaneous method than in the past, with songs stemming from improvised jam sessions.

== Writing and composition ==
Vocalist and guitarist Eric Pulido notes that the album's title refers to Tim Smith's departure: "This album is a response to what’s gone on with Tim. The original Antiphon was an orator in Ancient Greece who was part of an oligarchy that fought democracy. But we didn’t overthrow Tim! He’s not Antiphon." Pulido elaborated, "In a bigger way, it's kind of the plight of man. It's not about what happens to you, it's how you respond to it that you're defined."

== Track listing ==
No.	Title	Length
1.	"Antiphon"	3:16
2.	"Provider"	3:48
3.	"The Old and the Young"	5:36
4.	"It's Going Down"	3:17
5.	"Vale"	4:31
6.	"Aurora Gone"	4:37
7.	"Ages"	4:39
8.	"This Weight"	3:33
9.	"Corruption"	5:17
10.	"Provider (Reprise)"	5:01
