= Hold On =

Hold On may refer to:

== Film ==
- Hold On! (film) (1966), an American musical featuring Herman's Hermits
- Hold On (2019 film), an American drama
- Hold On, a 2002 short film featuring Melissa Joan Hart
- Hold On, a 2008 short film featuring Dominic West

== Music ==
=== Albums ===
- Hold On (High Inergy album), 1980
- Hold On (Name Taken album), 2004
- Hold On (Nitty Gritty Dirt Band album), 1987
- Hold On (Trapeze album) or the title song, 1979
- Hold On! (album), by Herman's Hermits, or the title song, 1966
- Hold On, by Alan Frew, 1994
- Hold On, by Bombadil, 2015
- Hold On, by Carolyne Mas, 1980
- Hold On, by Chord Overstreet, or the title song, 2020
- Hold On, by Dan Hill, or the title song, 1976
- Hold On, by Jaki Graham, 1995
- Hold On, by Lisa Hartman, 1979
- Hold On, by Mordechai Ben David, 1984
- Hold On, by Noel Pointer, 1978
- Hold On! It's Joe Tex, by Joe Tex, 1965

=== EPs ===
- Hold On (Rapture Ruckus EP) or the title song, 2010
- Hold On (Spencer Tracy EP) or the title song, 2003

=== Songs ===
- "Hold On" (folk song), or "Gospel Plow", a traditional African American spiritual
- "Hold On" (50 Cent song), 2014
- "Hold On" (Alabama Shakes song), 2012
- "Hold On" (Alexia song), 1997
- "Hold On" (All That Remains song), 2010
- "Hold On" (Badfinger song), 1981
- "Hold On" (Brand Nubian song), 1994
- "Hold On" (Colbie Caillat song), 2013
- "Hold On" (En Vogue song), 1990
- "Hold On" (Ian Thomas song), 1981; covered by Santana, 1982
- "Hold On" (John Lennon song), 1970
- "Hold On" (Jonas Brothers song), 2007
- "Hold On" (Justin Bieber song), 2021
- "Hold On" (Kansas song), 1980
- "Hold On" (Korn song), 2007
- "Hold On" (KT Tunstall song), 2007
- "Hold On" (Lil Tjay song), 2019
- "Hold On" (Loft song), 1993
- "Hold On" (Måns Zelmerlöw song), 2009
- "Hold On" (Michael Bublé song), 2009
- "Hold On" (Nano song), 2017
- "Hold On" (Nervo song), 2013
- "Hold On" (Rosanne Cash song), 1986
- "Hold On" (Sarah McLachlan song), 1993
- "Hold On" (Sbtrkt song), 2012
- "Hold On" (Sean Paul song), 2012
- "Hold On" (Skepta song), 2012
- "Hold On" (Stellar Kart song), 2006
- "Hold On" (Tanya Blount song), 1994
- "Hold On" (Triumph song), 1979
- "Hold On" (Wilson Phillips song), 1990
- "Hold On" (Yes song), 1983
- "Hold On (A Little Longer)", by Steve Wariner, 1988
- "Hold On (If You Believe in Love)", by CB Milton, 1994
- "Hold On (Shut Up)", by Machine Gun Kelly, 2012
- "Hold On (To My Love)", by Jimmy Ruffin, 1980
- "Bottle Living" / "Hold On", a single by Dave Gahan, 2003
- "Hold On", by 22-20s from 22-20s, 2004
- "Hold On", by 33Miles from 33Miles, 2007
- "Hold On", by 911 from Moving On, 1998
- "Hold On", by Abandon from Searchlights, 2009
- "Hold On", by Adele from 30, 2021
- "Hold On", by Aiden Grimshaw from Misty Eye, 2012
- "Hold On", by Air Supply from Mumbo Jumbo, 2010
- "Hold On", by the Almost from Southern Weather, 2007
- "Hold On", by the Angels from Red Back Fever, 1991
- "Hold On", by Angus & Julia Stone from Down the Way, 2010
- "Hold On", by Annie from The A&R EP, 2013
- "Hold On", by April Wine from Walking Through Fire, 1985
- "Hold On", by Armin van Buuren and Davina Michelle, 2021
- "Hold On", by Artist vs. Poet from Favorite Fix, 2010
- "Hold On", by Atlantic Starr from Love Crazy, 1991
- "Hold On", by Avec Sans, 2013
- "Hold On", by B*Witched from The Princess Diaries soundtrack, 2001
- "Hold On", by Barbara Dickson from You Know It's Me, 1981
- "Hold On", by Bassnectar from Noise vs. Beauty, 2014
- "Hold On", by Be Good from Seven Star Hotel, 2009
- "Hold On", by the Beekeepers, 1996
- "Hold On", by Ben Kweller and Selena Gomez from the Rudderless film soundtrack, 2014
- "Hold On", by Benjamin Orr from The Lace, 1986
- "Hold On", by Bernie Worrell from All the Woo in the World, 1978
- "Hold On", by Beth Croft from Rule in My Heart, 2014
- "Hold On", by Bif Naked from Purge, 2001
- "Hold On", by Billy Branigan from the Jumpin' Jack Flash film soundtrack, 1986
- "Hold On", by Black Box from Dreamland, 1990
- "Hold On", by Blink-182, the intended title for "MH 4.18.2011" from Neighborhoods, 2011
- "Hold On", by Bonham from Mad Hatter, 1992
- "Hold On", by Bread of Stone from The Real Life, 2013
- "Hold On", by Britny Fox from Britny Fox, 1988
- "Hold On", by CAB from CAB 4, 2003
- "Hold On", by Cappadonna from The Pilgrimage, 2011
- "Hold On", by Carole King from Simple Things, 1977
- "Hold On", by Cascada from Evacuate the Dancefloor, 2009
- "Hold On", by Cast from the single "Live the Dream", 1997
- "Hold On", by the Chain Gang of 1974
- "Hold On", by Charlie Simpson from Young Pilgrim, 2011
- "Hold On", by Cherri Bomb from This Is the End of Control, 2012
- "Hold On", by Chicago from Chicago XIV, 1980
- "Hold On", by Chris Cayzer from the Bituing Walang Ningning TV series soundtrack, 2006
- "Hold On", by Chris de Burgh from Far Beyond These Castle Walls, 1974
- "Hold On", by Chris Smither from Small Revelations, 1997
- "Hold On", by Christy McNichol from The Pirate Movie film soundtrack, 1982
- "Hold On", by Cliff Richard from Silver, 1983
- "Hold On", by the Commodores from Movin' On, 1975
- "Hold On", by Conception from Flow, 1997
- "Hold On", by Corey Hart from the Beverly Hills Cop II film soundtrack, 1987
- "Hold On", by Crack the Sky from Crack the Sky, 1975
- "Hold On", by the Crusaders from Royal Jam, 1982
- "Hold On", by Crystal Bowersox from Farmer's Daughter, 2010
- "Hold On", by Crystal Kay, B-side of the single "Journey (Kimi to Futari de)", 2010
- "Hold On", by Curren$y from Pilot Talk II, 2010
- "Hold On", by Dannii Minogue from Get Into You, 1993
- "Hold On", by Darius Rucker from Back to Then, 2002
- "Hold On", by Dashboard Confessional from The Swiss Army Romance, 2000
- "Hold On", by David Archuleta from Forevermore, 2012
- "Hold On", by David Banner from The Greatest Story Ever Told, 2008
- "Hold On", by David Gray from Lost Songs 95–98, 2000
- "Hold On", by Dead by April from Let the World Know, 2014
- "Hold On", by Dee C. Lee, 1986
- "Hold On", by Deep Purple from Stormbringer, 1974
- "Hold On", by Delta Goodrem from Wings of the Wild, 2016
- "Hold On", by the Desert Rose Band from Life Goes On, 1993
- "Hold On", by the Devin Townsend Project from Epicloud, 2012
- "Hold On", by Dina Carroll from So Close, 1993
- "Hold On", by Donavon Frankenreiter from Glow, 2010
- "Hold On", by Donna Hughes with Mary Chapin Carpenter, 2007
- "Hold On", by Donny Osmond from Donny Osmond, 1989
- "Hold On", by Dope from Blood Money Part 1, 2016
- "Hold On", by Duke Dumont, 2013
- "Hold On", by Dwele from Subject, 2003
- "Hold On", by El Da Sensei from The Unusual, 2006
- "Hold On", by El Presidente from El Presidente, 2005
- "Hold On", by Elemeno P from Love & Disrespect, 2003
- "Hold On", by Emmylou Harris from All I Intended to Be, 2008
- "Hold On", by Enchantment from Enchantment, 1977
- "Hold On", by Enemy You from the various artists compilation album Four on the Floor, 1999
- "Hold On", by Eric Clapton from August, 1986
- "Hold On", by E.S.G. from Shinin' n' Grindin', 1999
- "Hold On", by Euroboys from Soft Focus, 2004
- "Hold On", by the Exponents from Something Beginning with C, 1992
- "Hold On", by Flame from Our World: Redeemed, 2008
- "Hold On", by Flor, 2017
- "Hold On", by Foreign Beggars from Asylum Speakers, 2003
- "Hold On", by Former Ghosts from Fleurs, 2009
- "Hold On", by Freddie Mercury and Jo Dare, 1987
- "Hold On", by Friendly Fires from Pala, 2011
- "Hold On", by Gail Davies, 1982
- "Hold On", by Galneryus from Union Gives Strength, 2021
- "Hold On", by Gary Clark, Jr. from The Story of Sonny Boy Slim, 2015
- "Hold On", by George Alice, 2022
- "Hold On", by Gladys Knight & The Pips from the Claudine film soundtrack, 1974
- "Hold On", by Go Radio from Lucky Street, 2011
- "Hold On", by Good Charlotte from The Young and the Hopeless, 2002
- "Hold On", by Great White from Great White, 1984
- "Hold On", by Green Day from Warning, 2000
- "Hold On", by Half Japanese from Perfect, 2016
- "Hold On", by H.E.R. from Back of My Mind, 2021
- "Hold On", by the Hippos from The Hippos, 2003
- "Hold On", by the Hollies from Distant Light, 1971
- "Hold On", by Holly Cole from Dark Dear Heart, 1997
- "Hold On", by Holly Woods from Live It Up!, 2007
- "Hold On", by Holy Ghost!, 2010
- "Hold On", by Hootie & the Blowfish from Imperfect Circle, 2019
- "Hold On", by Hostyle Gospel from Desperation, 2013
- "Hold On", by Hot Chip from Made in the Dark, 2008
- "Hold On", by Ian Gomm, 1978
- "Hold On", by Ian McLagan from Troublemaker, 1979
- "Hold On", by Ian McNabb and various artists, 2012
- "Hold On", by Icon from More Perfect Union, 1987
- "Hold On", by Icona Pop from This Is... Icona Pop, 2013
- "Hold On", by Illenium from Ascend, 2019
- "Hold On", by I.O.I from Miss Me?, 2016
- "Hold On", by Jack Ingram and Sheryl Crow from This Is It, 2007
- "Hold On", by James Grehan from the Packed to the Rafters TV series soundtrack, 2009
- "Hold On", by Jamie Walters from Jamie Walters, 1994
- "Hold On", by Jammin from the compilation album Heartless Crew Presents Crisp Biscuit Vol 1, 2002
- "Hold On", by Jem from Beachwood Canyon, 2016
- "Hold On", by Jes, Shant and Clint Maximus, 2015
- "Hold On", by Jet, B-side of the single "Put Your Money Where Your Mouth Is", 2006
- "Hold On", by Jimmy Barnes from Two Fires, 1990
- "Hold On", by JJ Cale from Troubadour, 1976
- "Hold On", by John Conlee from Rose Colored Glasses, 1978
- "Hold On", by John Miles from Miles High, 1981
- "Hold On", by Johnny Mathis from Right from the Heart, 1985
- "Hold On", by Jon Spencer Blues Explosion from Plastic Fang, 2002
- "Hold On", by José Nunez featuring Octahvia, 1999
- "Hold On", by Jude Johnstone from On a Good Day, 2005
- "Hold On", by Julian Lennon from Everything Changes, 2011
- "Hold On", by Juliette Schoppmann from Unique, 2004
- "Hold On", by Jung Joon Young from Teenager, 2014
- "Hold On", by Just Jack from Overtones, 2007
- "Hold On", by Kard from Way with Words, 2020
- "Hold On", by Kareem Salama, 2006
- "Hold On", by Karen Clark Sheard from All in One, 2010
- "Hold On", by Kobra and the Lotus from High Priestess, 2014
- "Hold On", by the Korgis from This World's for Everyone, 1992
- "Hold On", by Kossoff, Kirke, Tetsu and Rabbit from Kossoff, Kirke, Tetsu and Rabbit, 1972
- "Hold On", by Kristinia DeBarge from Young & Restless, 2013
- "Hold On", by Kygo from Kygo, 2024
- "Hold On", by Lady Kash, 2011
- "Hold On", by Lazee, 2009
- "Hold On", by Leon Bolier, 2008
- "Hold On", by Lil' Kim featuring Mary J. Blige from The Notorious K.I.M., 2000
- "Hold On", by Limp Bizkit from Chocolate Starfish and the Hot Dog Flavored Water, 2000
- "Hold On", by Lion from Trouble in Angel City, 1989
- "Hold On", by Lion Babe from Begin, 2016
- "Hold On", by Lisa Miller from Version Originale, 2003
- "Hold On", by Los Lobos from The Town and the City, 2006
- "Hold On", by Lou Reed from New York, 1989
- "Hold On", by Love Transistor, remixed by Gigi D'Agostino, from D'Agostino's album Some Experiments, 2006
- "Hold On", by Mandy Musgrave from the soundtrack album The N Soundtrack, 2006
- "Hold On", by Mary Mary from Incredible, 2002
- "Hold On", by Melanie Brown from L.A. State of Mind, 2005
- "Hold On", by Mental As Anything from Fundamental, 1985
- "Hold On", by MercyMe from The Hurt & the Healer, 2012
- "Hold On", by Michelle Tumes from the various artists compilation album Streams, 1999
- "Hold On", by Minus Story from No Rest for Ghosts, 2005
- "Hold On", by Mob Rules from Temple of Two Suns, 2000
- "Hold On", by Models from Models' Media, 1986
- "Hold On", by Moguai, 2015
- "Hold On", by Møme, 2016
- "Hold On", by Mr. Scruff from Ninja Tuna, 2008
- "Hold On", by Mýa from Smoove Jones, 2016
- "Hold On", by Natalie Cole from Don't Look Back, 1980
- "Hold On", by Nemesea from Uprise, 2016
- "Hold On", by Neocolours
- "Hold On", by Netsky from Second Nature, 2020
- "Hold On", by New Kids on the Block, B-side of the single "Tonight", 1990
- "Hold On", by Nichole Nordeman from Brave, 2005
- "Hold On", by Nitzer Ebb from Showtime, 1990
- "Hold On", by the Noel Redding Band from Blowin', 1976
- "Hold On", by Northern Pikes from Neptune, 1992
- "Hold On", by Olly Murs from Olly Murs, 2010
- "Hold On", by Onehundredhours from As Sure as the Stars, 2007
- "Hold On", by the Orchids from Lyceum, 1989
- "Hold On", by Osibisa from Monsore, 1997
- "Hold On", by Pearl Jam from Lost Dogs, 2003
- "Hold On", by Pet Shop Boys from Elysium, 2012
- "Hold On", by Peter Furler from On Fire, 2011
- "Hold On", by Pharoahe Monch from Desire, 2007
- "Hold On", by Phil Wickham from Heaven & Earth, 2009
- "Hold On", by Phillip Phillips from The World from the Side of the Moon, 2012
- "Hold On", by Phrase from Talk with Force, 2005
- "Hold On", by Phyllis Hyman from You Know How to Love Me, 1979
- "Hold On", by the Pinker Tones from Wild Animals, 2008
- "Hold On", by Plain White T's from Every Second Counts, 2006
- "Hold On", by Popcaan from Where We Come From, 2014
- "Hold On", by the Potbelleez from The Potbelleez, 2008
- "Hold On", by Purple Ribbon All-Stars from Got Purp? Vol. 2, 2005
- "Hold On", by Pusha T from My Name Is My Name, 2013
- "Hold On", by Quazedelic, 2010
- "Hold On", by the Rascals from See, 1969
- "Hold On", by Razorlight from Razorlight, 2006
- "Hold On", by Reba McEntire from Reba Nell McEntire, 1986
- "Hold On", by Red Rockers from Condition Red, 1981
- "Hold On", by Reef from Getaway, 2000
- "Hold On", by Remedy Drive from Resuscitate, 2012
- "Hold On", by Roger Shah and Judge Jules, 2010
- "Hold On", by Rollins Band from Get Some Go Again Sessions, 2005
- "Hold On", by Royal Blood from Typhoons, 2021
- "Hold On", by Rusko from OMG, 2010
- "Hold On", by Rynx, 2019
- "Hold On", by Salt-n-Pepa from Brand New, 1997
- "Hold On", by Sarkodie featuring Raquel from Sarkology, 2014
- "Hold On", by Sawyer Brown from Outskirts of Town, 1993
- "Hold On", by Saxon from Dogs of War, 1995
- "Hold On", by the Scott Brothers, 2015
- "Hold On", by Senses Fail from The Fire, 2010
- "Hold On", by Sepalcure from Sepalcure, 2011
- "Hold On", by Shae Jones from Talk Show, 1999
- "Hold On", by Sharon Tandy, 1967
- "Hold On", by Shawn McDonald from Simply Nothing, 2004
- "Hold On", by Shawn Mendes from Illuminate, 2016
- "Hold On", by Silverline from Lights Out, 2013
- "Hold On", by Simon Collins from Time for Truth, 2005
- "Hold On", by Sister Hazel from Lift, 2004
- "Hold On", by Slaughter from The Wild Life, 1992
- "Hold On", by Slushii from Out of Light, 2017
- "Hold On", by the Special Goodness from Natural, 2012
- "Hold On", by Spiritualized from Amazing Grace, 2003
- "Hold On", by Spitalfield from Better than Knowing Where You Are, 2006
- "Hold On", by Spoken from Breathe Again, 2015
- "Hold On", by Stacy Clark from Connect the Dots, 2010
- "Hold On", by Starsailor from Good Souls: The Greatest Hits, 2015
- "Hold On", by Steve Jones from Fire and Gasoline, 1989
- "Hold On", by Steve Winwood from Steve Winwood, 1977
- "Hold On", by Stevie Salas, 1997
- "Hold On", by Subseven, 2005
- "Hold On", by Sun 60 from The Baby-Sitters Club film soundtrack, 1995
- "Hold On", by Tajja Isen from the Atomic Betty TV series soundtrack, 2005
- "Hold On", by Take That from Beautiful World, 2006
- "Hold On", by Tall Tales and True, 1989
- "Hold On", by Tamta from Awake, 2020
- "Hold On", by Taxiride from Axiomatic, 2005
- "Hold On", by Teri DeSario from Moonlight Madness, 1979
- "Hold On", by Thelma Houston, 1990
- "Hold On", by Three Man Army, 1973
- "Hold On", by Tim Armstrong from A Poet's Life, 2007
- "Hold On", by Timbaland & Magoo from Under Construction, Part II, 2003
- "Hold On", by Toad the Wet Sprocket from Starting Now, 2021
- "Hold On", by TobyMac from Tonight, 2010
- "Hold On", by Tom Waits from Mule Variations, 1999
- "Hold On", by Trae from The Beginning, 2008
- "Hold On", by Trick Daddy from www.thug.com, 1998
- "Hold On", by Trick-Trick from The Villain, 2008
- "Hold On", by Twin Atlantic from Great Divide, 2014
- "Hold On", by the Verlaines from Ready to Fly, 1991
- "Hold On", by Warren G from The G Files, 2009
- "Hold On", by White Heart from White Heart, 1982
- "Hold On", by Whitford/St. Holmes from Whitford/St. Holmes, 1981
- "Hold On", by Wild Cherry from Wild Cherry, 1976
- "Hold On", by Wishbone Ash from Twin Barrels Burning, 1982
- "Hold On", by Xscape from Traces of My Lipstick, 1998
- "Hold On", by Yngwie Malmsteen from Odyssey, 1988
- "Hold On", by Yolanda Adams from What a Wonderful Time, 2007
- "Hold On", by Young Buck from Buck the World, 2007
- "Hold On", by ZZ Ward from The Storm, 2017
- "Hold On", from the musical Lysistrata Jones, 2011
- "Hold On (To What You Got)", by Gary U.S. Bonds from On the Line, 1982

== See also ==
- Just Hold On (disambiguation)
- Holding On (disambiguation)
