= The North Star (Remedy Drive album) =

Studio album by Remedy Drive
- Released: January 12, 2018
- Length: 56:15
- Label: Independent
- Producer: Philip Zach

Remedy Drive chronology
Hope's Not Giving Up (2016)	The North Star (2018)	Living Room Anthology, Vol. 1 (2020)

The North Star is the thirteenth studio album by American Christian rock band Remedy Drive. It is the second in a trilogy of counter-trafficking albums, the first of which being 2014's Commodity and the third being 2021's Imago Amor. The album was released independently on January 12, 2018. The album was produced by the band's co-founder Philip Zach, who also produced Commodity and Imago Amor.

== Commercial performance ==
The album featured one charting song, "Warlike", which reached No. 7 on the BDS Christian Rock National Airplay chart and was featured on the Christian Rock Most Added chart. Although the song "Polaris" did not enter any charts, it was featured on BDS's Christian Rock Most Added chart.

== Critical reception ==
Professional ratings
Review scores
Source	Rating
Jesus Freak Hideout	4.5/5 stars
CCM Magazine	4.5/5 stars

The North Star received generally favorable reviews from critics. In a 4.5 star review for Jesus Freak Hideout, Alex Caldwell praised the album, calling the album an "Epic, challenging and heart-breaking record", and saying that "The combination of a powerhouse message against the backdrop of gorgeous and urgent songwriting makes The North Star a contender for best album of the year." CCM Magazine gave the album 4.5 stars as well, saying, "Remedy Drive‘s The North Star will be one of 2018’s releases-to-remember."

== Track listing ==
No.	Title	Writer(s)	Length
1.	"You've Got Fire" (featuring Rachael Lampa)	David Zach	4:16
2.	"Warlike"	D. Zach, Philip Zach	4:41
3.	"Brighter Than Apathy"	D. Zach	7:09
4.	"Sunlight on Her Face"	D. Zach	5:19
5.	"Redemption Song" (Bob Marley and the Wailers cover)	Bob Marley, Edwin Hawkins	4:32
6.	"I Don't Belong to You" (featuring Propoganda)	D. Zach	3:38
7.	"Polaris"	D. Zach	4:29
8.	"Sanctuary"	D. Zach, P. Zach, Jason Petty	5:42
9.	"Kingdom"	D. Zach	0:59
10.	"Endless"	D. Zach	5:29
11.	"Disappear" (originally on Light Makes a Way EP)	D. Zach, Jason Ingram	4:50
12.	"Sunlight on Her Face" (cello)	D. Zach	5:07
Total length:			56:15

== Personnel ==
=== Remedy Drive ===
- David Zach – lead vocals, guitars, keys
- Corey Horn – additional guitars, ukulele, background vocals
- Timmy Jones – drums

=== Additional musicians ===
- Philip Zach – synths, programming, bass, background vocals
- Rachael Lampa – additional vocals on "You've Got Fire"
- Jason Petty – additional vocals on "Sanctuary"
- Justin Lepard – cello
- Masunzi John, Frebour Angel, Console U Nyirantegerwa, Esperana Nyirunseruka, Nziza R. Mirama Peter, Unurihand Espoir, Chantal Ukiase, Bienfat Umusaza, Nadine Utumansema, Dan Mugisha, William Peter, Asser Stephern, Elias Tuyishime, Timmy Jones, Jesi Jones, Coery Horn, Anna Zach – background vocals on "Brighter Than Apathy"

=== Production ===
- Philip Zach – producer, cover artwork, graphic design and layout, mixing, engineering
- James Dickerson – additional engineering
- Nick Johnson – additional engineering
- Corey Horn – additional engineering
- Jason Germain – mastering
- Jeremy Cowart – photography
- Kate Zach – studio photography
