= Commodity (disambiguation) =

A commodity is a fungible type of economic good.

Commodity may also refer to:

- Commodity (Marxism), the subject of a trade or other exchange
- Commodity, part of firmness, commodity, and delight
- Commodity (album), 2014 album by the Christian rock band Remedy Drive

== See also ==
- Commodity money
- Commodity market
- Commodity fetishism
