= Holding On =

Holding On may refer to:

== Film and television ==
- Holding On (1977 TV series), a 1977 British television drama
- Holding On (TV series), a 1997 British television drama
- "Holding On" (House), the 21st episode of the eighth season of medical drama House, M.D.
- "Holding On" (Press Gang), a 1991 television episode

== Literature ==
- Holding On, a book by Mervyn Jones

== Songs ==
- "Holding On" (Beverley Craven song)
- "Holding On" (Dannii Minogue song)
- "Holding On" (Disclosure song)
- "Holding On" (Steve Winwood song)
- "Holding On (When Love Is Gone)", by L.T.D.
- "Holdin On" (Flume song)
- "Holdin' On" (Tane Cain song)
- "Holdin' On (To the Love I Got)", a song by Tammy Wynette, later recorded by Barbara Mandrell
- "Holding On", by DragonForce from The Power Within
- "Holding On", by FireHouse from Prime Time
- "Holding On", by Iann Dior
- "Holding On", by Infernal
- "Holding On", by Jay Sean from Me Against Myself
- "Holding On", by Simple Plan from Simple Plan
- "Holding On", by The War on Drugs from A Deeper Understanding
- "Holdin' On", by Jessi Colter from Ridin' Shotgun

== See also ==
- Hold On (disambiguation)
