= Vladimir Gustov =

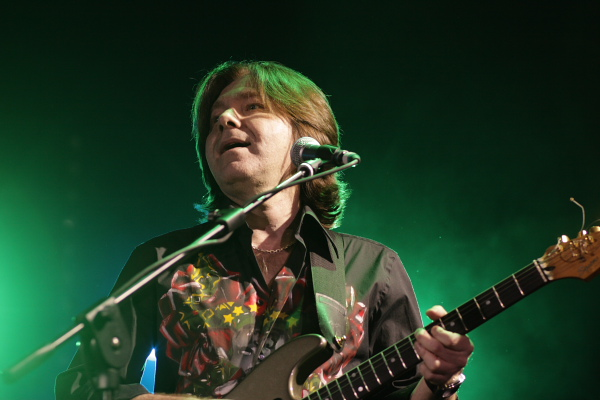
- Gustov in 2009

Background information
- Born: June 26, 1961 (age 64); Saint Petersburg, Russia
- Genres: Instrumental rock, hard rock, rock, pop rock, folk rock
- Occupation(s): Musician, songwriter, producer, arranger
- Instrument(s): Guitar, bass, keyboards, vocals
- Years active: 1975–present

Vladimir Gustov (Russian: Влади́мир Константинович Гу́стов; born 26 June 1961 in Leningrad, now Saint Petersburg) is a Russian guitarist, arranger, composer, and sound producer. Currently he is the Maxim Leonidov and Hippoband leader.

== Career ==
Started to play music when he was 5 years old. In 1972, after he came across the album "McCartney 1", Vladimir put together his first musical group. At that time, he started to experiment with music while trying to mix sound with two antiquated tape recorders "Sonata". In 1975, after the release of the Queen's "A Night at the Opera", Vladimir was so impressed with the album that he decided to dedicate himself to music as a professional.

=== Cascade Studio ===
Gustov's musical career began in the mid-1970s in an amateur group "Cascade Studio". Two Vladimir Gustov's school friends, Alexander Shilnikov (bass) and Boris Kornilov (keyboards), played with V.G. in this group initially. Later, in 1977, they were joined by a singer, Alexander Scheglov (who played later in groups such as "Maraphon" and "Russkie") and a drummer, Pavel Razhivin (trio "Secret"). The musicians played the music of Humble Pie, Deep Purple, and Santana; they also performed their own Art-rock compositions with psychedelic elements, written mostly by Vladimir. The band won several awards at St. Petersburg's musical festivals organized by the local Komsomol leaders. In 1979, Boris Kornilov was drafted in the military and the band was dismantled. There are several amateur recordings of the "Studio Cascade." Unfortunately, they cannot be re-mastered. At different times, the group was joined by Valeri Brysilovsky (drums; he also played for "Rossiyane," "Zemlyane," "Arsenal," and "Kvadro"), Vladimir Belousov (drums), and Nelly Cherkasova (violin). In 1978, when he was 17, he successfully substituted for an ailing guitar player from a touring English band "Tony Monopoly". This performance made him noticed by many in the show business. In 1980, Gustov graduated from the Leningrad Musical College (a.k.a. Musorgsky School) with a major in Jazz Guitar. Later he taught guitar classes in this school as an adjunct for five years. Among his students was Alexander Liapin ("Aquarium"), with whom Vladimir Gustov formed a legendary group "Tele U".

=== Tele-U ===
Tele-U, the first solo project of the guitarist Alexander Liapin, was put together in the winter of 1983, when he was joined by the guitarist Vladimir Gustov and several musicians played in other St. Petersburg's rock-club bands. Having been thought out as a duo of the two blues-guitar virtuosos, the project became a great success. Tele-U took part in the second and third rock music festivals. The group won a major award in the category "Musical Performance" at the second festival; both Liapin and Troshchenkov (drums) won awards as best musicians; the song "No to a War" was named among the best of the festival. In 1986, the group ceased to exist due to Gustov's departure. There are no known recordings of the group except one composition named "Autumn Tale". The main tracks of it (acoustic guitars and percussion) were recorded in the studio of Sovetskaya hotel and then reworked at the studio of the Leningrad Radio House. Gustov's album Mystery life contains this version of the composition. Gustov combined his teaching with working at a sound studio, occasional appearances on jazz festivals together with a quartet of a saxophonist, Mikhail Kostyushkin ("Pop Mekhanika," D.Goloshekin Band, and "Tea For Two" (Chay Vdvoyom), and playing music with several other groups.

An acquaintance with the composer Viktor Reznikov had a huge impact on Gustov's professional skills and career. Several recording studio projects with Alla Pugacheva, Larisa Dolina, Mikhail Boyarski, Tynis Miagi, and Jaak Jola have made Gustov's musical work to stand out. Quite a few musical publications placed Vladimir among the best musicians of the Soviet Union. At that time, Alla Pugacheva has made Vladimir an offer to work in her musical group called "Recital." That plan did not get through because of a number of bureaucratic obstacles: to get the job, Gustov must have obtained a Moscow residence permit, which could have resulted in his two-year compulsory military service. Several years later, Alla and Gustov performed a song together ("A Flame in a Hand") during the Christmas television show "Rozhdestenskie Vstrechi". In 1986, Alexandr Revzin, now a well-known show business director and producer, founded a group named "Rendezvous" and asked Gustov to join it.

=== Rendezvous ===
This group was founded by Alexander Revzin, now a famous musical and theater director. The group was made up of a group of best musicians and a ballet group headed by Gennady Senkov. After a brief rehearsal period, the first concert program was released. The group played so-called "cover" music of "Yes", "Foreigner", and "Dire Straits" as well as original compositions written by Vladimir Gustov, Alexei Petrov, and Konstantin Balakirev. "Rendezvous" gave more than 500 performances and toured in Estonia and Latvia. The group's compositions gained popularity all across the country. Among the friends of "Rendezvous" who visited its shows were Alla Pugacheva, Vladimir Kuzmin, Larisa Dolina, members of the theatrical groups "Booff" and "Litzedei", and many others. "Rendezvous" was dissolved in December 1988. In 1988, Vladimir and several other musicians from this group started their own rehearsals that ended up in a creation of a new band, "Radio Rock".

=== Radio Rock ===
This group was a project of the famous Leningrad guitarist, recording artist, and songwriter, Vladimir Gustov. In the summer of 1988, Gustov, working in the recording studio with Vladimir Kharitonov, helped this young singer to record a new song called A New Day. The song became a success and the two decided to continue their cooperation. By the end of the fall, they determined who would play for a new group called Radio Rock, and by December of the same year, they started to rehearse. Besides Gustov (guitar, vocals) and Kharitonov (vocals), the group was joined by Valeri Sudakov (bass) Evgeny Oleshev (keyboards), Vladimir Kushnir (keyboards), and Sergei Doikov (drums). In the summer of 1989, Radio Rock took part in an annual TV musical festival Jurmala-89 and Vladimir Kharitonov won a prestigious award. The album "Religion" was released in the same year. The group then completed a successful tour around Russia and Ukraine, and gave great performances in Leningrad together with English groups Passion and Gipsy Queen. An Irish Television company recorded the concerts. V. Kushnir left the group in October 1989 to join Secret. In January of the next year, Vadim Ryabov (who played previously for St. Petersburg) has replaced the departed S. Sudakov. In 1990, after a music festival in Paris, Vladimir Kharitonov decided to leave the group. He was replaced by Viacheslav Shkutov. By the end of this year, Radio Rock takes place in Alla Pugacheva's program, Rozhdestvenskie Vstrechi [Christmas Encounters]. In August 1991, the group opens a concert, Rock Against Tanks on the Palace Square in Leningrad. The second album, "The Russian Eagle" was recorded in the summer of 1991. The last album of the group, "The Crime and the Punishment" was recorded in 1995. The group has retained a new drummer, Tigran Panteleev, and S. Shkutov was replaced by a new and talented singer and composer, Igor Balakirev. In 1996, the group was dissolved. Balakirev and Gustov created their new group, Be Good. E. Oleshev works in a recording studio and also plays, as well as Gustov, in the Max Leonidov Group. Vadim Riabov is a singer in the vocal group Digest. Tigran Panteleev moved to the U.S. During all these years, the group's manager was Vadim Baikin.

The changes that occurred in Russia in the beginning of the 1990s have broken down the Iron Curtain. As a result, Gustov was invited and he accepted an invitation of Viktor Reznikov to play in a new group SUS (Soviet Union-United States).

=== SUS ===
SUS was a Russian-American project and a creation of the composer Victor Reznikov and American singer Dan Merrill. The members of the band got together in 1990: Victor Reznilov (vocals, keyboards), Dan Merrill (vocals, guitar), Steven Boutet (keyboards), Vladimir Gustov (guitar), Dmitry Evdomakha (drums). All the songs were written by Victor and Dan. In the recording studio, Kirill Shirokov and Victor Smirnov assisted with the orchestrations. The tragic death of Victor Reznikov in the beginning of 1992 has interrupted this great and promising project. There are recordings and video clips made by the studio "Record." Dan Merrill today is a successful performer in the USA. He is assisted in the recording studio by Kirill Shirokov, who moved to Canada a few years ago.

After recording with Radio Rock his third album, "The Crime and the Punishment", Vladimir gave several instrumental concerts together with guitarists Alexandr Liapin and Igor Romanov.

=== Cool Fire ===
"Cool Fire" is a group of friends-musicians who were gathered together by V.Gustov in 1996. The group does not have a permanent set of musicians. Its style is instrumental guitar music that varies from Fusion to Flash Rock. The group live performances are not frequent. The most memorable concerts were performed together with Igor Romanov's and Alexander Liapin's groups. In 1997, Vladimir Gustov creates his own recording studio, in which he puts together his own music and songs as well as music of other composers and performers.

=== Maxim Leonidov Group ===
In March 1996, Maxim Leonidov decided to draw together his own musical group to renew his performing career in Russia. His offer was accepted by Vladimir Gustov (guitar, vocals), Evgeny Oleshev (keyboards, vocals), Juri Guriev (bass, vocals), and Evgeny Lependin (drums, vocals). After two months of practicing, the first concert took place in May 1996 in the "Conti" casino. It was a success that indicated that a new group was born. During that year, at first at the studio "Lenfilm" and then at the new recording studio of Vladimir Gustov, the work on a new album, "Proplyvaya nad Gorodom" ["Soaring above the City"] began. This album was released in September 1997 and became popular. The hits such as "Videnie" [Vision], "V ee Glazakh Hali-gali" [Hali-Gali in her Eyes] and "Svingovyi Pereulok" [The Swing Street] were played by virtually all radio stations in Russia. At this time, E.Lependin moves to Moscow to work with V.Presniakov. The group started to look for a new drummer and have auditioned several candidates before selecting Juri Sonin who played in several alternative bands. The hard work of the group started. While touring around the country, the musicians did not forget about the recording job. A new album was released in 1999 and was called "Ne dai emu uiti" [Don't let him go]. The next three albums of Maxim Leonidov have been also recorded at the "Favourite" recording studio. They are: "The Best" (2000),"Chetverg" [Thursday] and recently released "Hippopotasm". Very often, in concerts and during the studio work, tremendous help is offered by an excellent St. Petersburg's saxophonist, Mikhail Zhidkikh, Larisa Dolina (vocals) and Nelly Zakrzhevskaya (violin) have also participated in the recordings. Six songs from Max albums were written by Vladimir Gustov: "Dozhd" [Rain], "Marshruty Zhuravlei" [Routs of the Cranes], "Igra" [The Play], "1979" . "Kto ja Takoy" (Who's I am )and "Barbie & Ken". V.Gustov is Hippoband musical director and sound producer. He was also a soundproducer The Secret Band ("Nichego ne Ischezaet" single (2003) and "Vsio eto i est Lubov" album (2015).

=== Be Good ===
"Be Good" was founded after the break-up of the group "Radio Rock" in 1996. Still, this is a recording group, which consists of two musicians: Vladimir Gustov and Igor Balakirev. All the songs written for the two albums were created by these two people. All their songs are in English. V.G. speaks the language since he was 7 and I.B. lived in the United States for several years and also speaks the language. Orchestrations are done by Vladimir and vocal-related work is performed by Igor. In a near future, the group is going to start to perform live.

As a guitar player, a multi-instrumentalist, and an orchestrator, Vladimir has managed more than 2,000 studio recording sessions. Eight times (1983, 1984, 1985, 1987, 1996, 1997, 2000 and 2007) Vladimir was named one of the best Russian musicians by various printed and online musical magazines. In 1990, Gustov's song, "New Day" performed by Larisa Dolina, has climbed to a second place in French musical charts.

== Discography ==
=== Radio Rock ===
- Religion (1989)
- The Russian Eagle (1991)
- The Crime & The Punishment (1995)
- The Anthology - 3 box set (2015)

=== Be Good ===
- All About You (2000)
- Careless Child (2004)
- See U Tonite (2006)
- Seven Star Hotel (2009)
- Welcome To My Party (2015)
- Tribute Queen - Live at Coliseum (2015)
- Not Bad - The Best! (2018)

=== Solo ===
- A Miracle of Miracles (1983)
- A Window to the Fall (1984)
- The Snow Queen (1987)
- Open Door (1987)
- Mystery Life (1988)
- Rock Tears (1991)
- Cool Fire (1995)
- Rabbits on the Moon (2015)
- Time is an Illusion (2020)
- The Space of Variation (2022)

== Rewards ==
Vladimir Gustov was named as the best Russian musician for nine times:

1983 — multi-instrumentalist, arranger;
1984, 1985, 2000 — guitar player;
1987, 1996 — songwriter;
1996 — overall musician;
2007 — audio engineer (twice).
