= Daylight Is Coming =

Studio album by Remedy Drive
- Released: August 26, 2008 (Original Edition); March 30, 2010 (Extended Edition & Daylight EP)
- Recorded: 2008
- Genre: Christian rock, pop rock, indie rock
- Length: 34:37 (Original Edition); 44:44 (Extended Edition); 16:17 (The Daylight EP)
- Label: Word
- Producer: Ian Eskelin

Remedy Drive chronology
Rip Open the Skies (2006)	Daylight Is Coming (2008)	Light Makes a Way (2011)

Singles from Daylight Is Coming
- 1. "Daylight" Released: 2008; 2. "All Along" Released: Late July 2009; 3. "Heartbeat" Released: November 2009

Professional ratings
Review scores
Source	Rating
allmusic	4/5 stars
Jesus Freak Hideout	4.5/5 stars

Daylight Is Coming is the first non-independent album from Christian rock band Remedy Drive. The album was released on August 26, 2008, on Word Records. It peaked at No. 119 on the Billboard 200, and No. 5 on the Hot Christian Albums. On March 30, 2010, an "Expanded Edition" of the album was released, with new artwork and three new tracks. The three new tracks were also organized into part of a Digital Download-only "The Daylight EP," with two additional, non-album tracks.

== Track listing ==
Album release
No.	Title	Writer(s)	Length
1.	"Stand Up"	David Zach	3:24
2.	"Daylight"	David Zach	3:53
3.	"All Along"	David Zach, Jason Ingram	3:05
4.	"Hope"	David Zach, Ian Eskelin	2:48
5.	"What Happens (At the End)"	Paul Zach, David Zach, Doug McKelvey	3:17
6.	"Something Made to Last"	Remedy Drive, Eskelin	2:34
7.	"Belong With You"	Philip Zach, Paul Zach, Jason Walker	3:22
8.	"Heartbeat"	David Zach, Eskelin	3:01
9.	"Get to Know You"	Paul Zach	3:00
10.	"Sunshine Above the Weather"	David Zach, Eskelin	3:03
11.	"Valuable"	David Zach	3:12
Total length:			34:37

The Daylight EP
No.	Title	Writer(s)	Length
1.	"Guide You Home"	David Zach, Paul Zach, Walker	3:13
2.	"Speak to Me"	Philip Zach, Walker	3:19
3.	"Rescue"	Paul Zach, David Zach, Dan Haseltine, Stephen Mason	3:35
4.	"Daylight (Soul Glow Activator Remix)"	David Zach, Solomon Olds	2:46
5.	"Guide You Home" (Acoustic)	David Zach, Paul Zach, Walker	3:24
Total length:			16:17

Daylight is Coming: Expanded Edition
No.	Title	Writer(s)	Length
1.	"Guide You Home"	David Zach, Paul Zach, Jason Walker	3:13
2.	"Speak to Me"	Philip Zach, Jason Walker	3:19
3.	"Rescue"	Paul Zach, David Zach, Dan Haseltine, Stephen Mason	3:35

== Radio singles ==
- "Daylight Is Coming"
- "All Along"
  - Billboard Hot Christian Songs peak: No. 10
  - R&R's Christian contemporary hit radio peak: No. 1
- "Heartbeat"
  - Billboard Hot Christian Songs peak: No. 34
- "Speak to Me"

== Awards ==
The album was nominated for a Dove Award for Rock/Contemporary Album of the Year at the 40th GMA Dove Awards.

== Album credits ==
- David Zach – lead vocals, keyboard, rhythm guitar
- Paul Zach – lead guitar, backing vocals
- Philip Zach – bass, backing vocals
- Daniel Zach – drums
- Produced by Ian Eskelin
- A&R - Otto Price, Jamie Kiner, & Jason Jenkins
- Recorded and Programmed by Aaron Shannon
- Drums recorded by Ben Phillips @ Bletchley Park (Nashville, Tennessee)
- Vocal Engineering and additional vocal production by Barry Weeks
- Mixed by JR McNeely @ Elm South Studio (Franklin, Tennessee), assisted by Steve Blackmon
- Mastered by Dan Shike @ Tone and Volume Mastering (Nashville, Tennessee)
- Photography by Jeremy Cowart
- Wardrobe & Grooming: Samantha Roe

=== Extended Edition additional track credits ===
- Produced by Ian Eskelin
- Recorded and Programmed by Aaron Shannon @ The Holiday Ian (Franklin, Tennessee)
- Vocal Engineering and additional vocal production by Barry Weeks
- Drums Recorded by Ben Phillips @ Superphonic (Nashville, Tennessee)
- Additional guitars by Mike Payne
- Mixed by Ainslie Grosser (Franklin, Tennessee)
