= Just Hold On (disambiguation) =

"Just Hold On" is a 2016 song by Steve Aoki and Louis Tomlinson.

Just Hold On may also refer to:

- "Just Hold On", a 2000 song by Toploader
- "Just Hold On", a 2020 song by Sub Focus featuring Wilkinson

== See also ==
- Hold On (disambiguation)
