= Remedy Drive =

American christian contemporary band

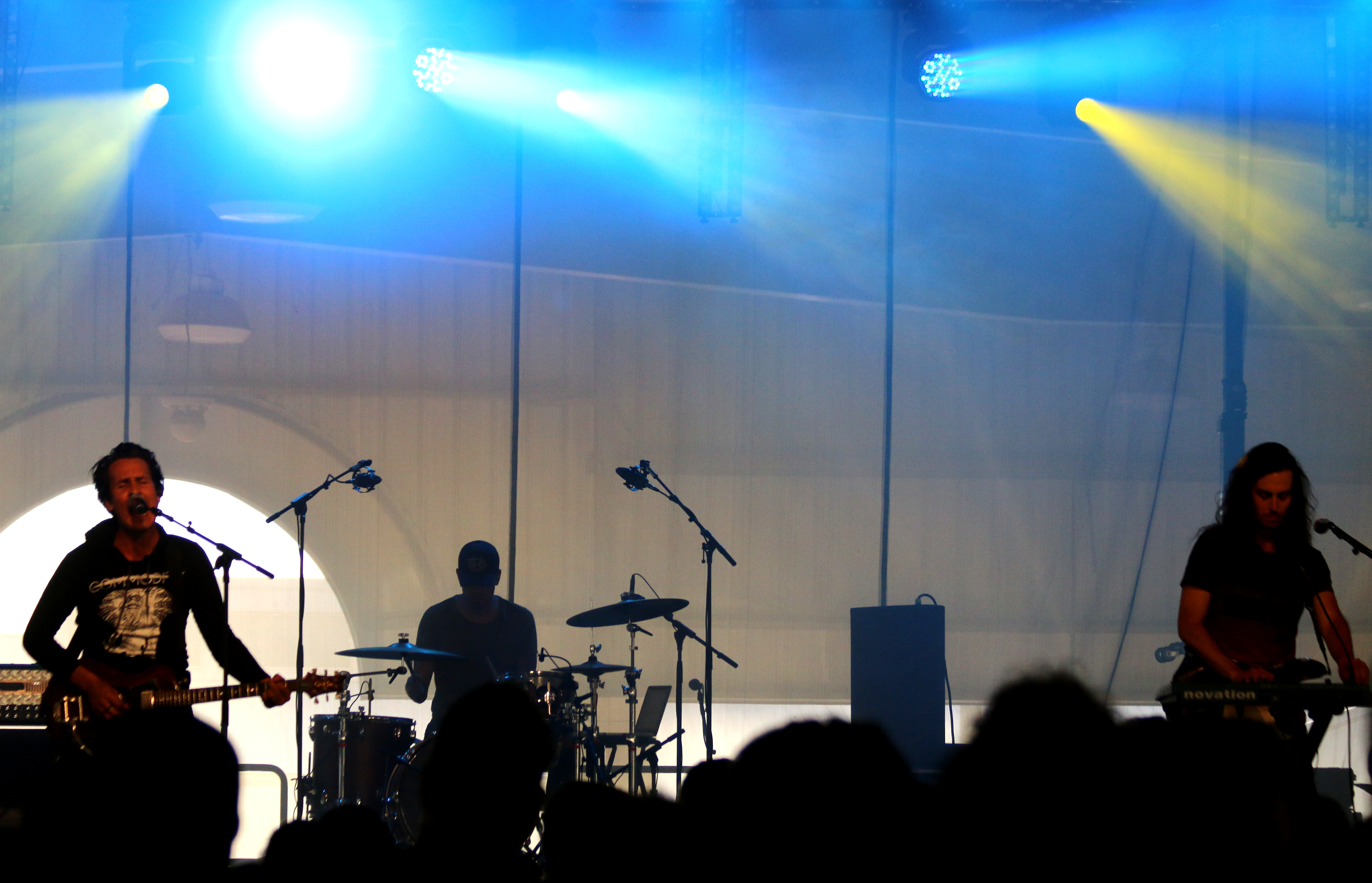
- Remedy Drive performing in 2017

Background information
- Also known as: Remedy
- Origin: Lincoln, Nebraska, U.S.
- Genres: Christian rock, pop rock, indie rock
- Years active: 1995–present
- Labels: Word, Centricity
- Members: David Zach; Dave Mohr; Chris Sooter; Timmy Jones; Philip Zach
- Past members: Daniel Zach; Corey Horn; Paul Zach; Tim Buell; Michael Sturd
- Website: remedydrive.com

Remedy Drive is an American alternative rock band founded in 1998 in Lincoln, Nebraska. They are now based in Nashville. The band consists of lead vocalist and guitarist David Zach, alternating bassists Philip Zach, Dave Mohr and Corey Horn, and alternating drummers Timmy Jones, Tim Buell and Zach Hunter (and occasional appearances by other drummers including Michael Sturd, Chris Sooter and Tzion Doxzon). They have recorded seven studio albums (five of them independent), one independent live album, and two EPs. The band was founded as a quartet consisting of the four Zach brothers. Three of the four brothers left the band in late 2010. Remedy Drive combats human trafficking through their organization Daylight United.

== History ==
Remedy Drive were formed as The Aslan Band in 1995 as a three-piece all-brother group, before a fourth brother, Paul, joined in 1998. They released their first album, Remedy, in 1998 under their original name. After changing their name to Remedy, they released four more independent albums: Remedy (The Blue One) (1999), Remedy (The Red One) (2001), Remedy: A Live Album (2003), and Magnify (2004). They changed their name again in 2004, this time to "Remedy Drive". They released Rip Open the Skies, which was released on April 25, 2006 and which has sold over 20,000 copies to date. The band toured primarily in the Midwest and West Coast of the United States playing over 200 concerts per year.

In 2008, the band was signed with Word Records and on August 28, 2008, they released Daylight Is Coming which was produced by Ian Eskelin followed by an Expanded Edition and an EP released on March 30, 2010.

On April 6, 2011, the band's website announced that all of the Zach brothers except David (Daniel, Philip and Paul Zach) would be leaving the band, to be replaced by Dave Mohr, Timmy Jones, and Corey Horn. The departure of the three brothers was heavily driven by feuding between the brothers, primarily between Philip and David, as well as Philip's declining singing ability following vocal surgery and scarring. The departure also marked the band's relocation to Nashville. Philip started his own recording studio in Lincoln named The Grid Studio, and started his own solo act (Arrows and Sound). Philip collaborated with Paul Zach and local Lincoln musicians (The Silver Pages), and started a two-man project with musician Coury Palermo (A Thousand Fires). The departure of the three brothers marked the beginning of a three-year, self-imposed silence between brothers, specifically between Philip and David.

On May 2, 2011, they independently released Light Makes a Way EP.

In 2012, they signed with Centricity Music and on August 18, 2012, they released Resuscitate. Drummer Timmy Jones left in 2013 to join For King and Country, and Nashville-based drummer Tim Buell stepped in. Buell left the band in 2015, which prompted appearances by Michael Sturd and Zach Hunter. Jones rejoined Remedy Drive in 2016.

Since 2014, the band's albums have been produced by former band member Philip Zach at The Grid Studio in Lincoln. On August 23, 2014, they released Commodity. On September 2, 2016, they released Hope's Not Giving Up. The North Star was released on January 12, 2018. Philip Zach is listed in the liner notes as being part of the band, along with Timmy Jones on drums.

=== Early independent releases (1995–2007) ===
The band was formed in 1995 under the name The Aslan Band, and independently released their first album in 1998, titled Remedy. They changed their band name to Remedy, and released their second independent album in 1999, titled Remedy (The Blue One), which was followed by a third independent album, released in 2001, titled Remedy (The Red One). In 2003, the band released an independent album titled Remedy: A Live Album, which featured live versions of 13 of the band's previously released songs. In 2004, they released an independent album titled Magnify. The band changed their name to Remedy Drive, and released their fifth independent album, titled Rip Open the Skies.

=== Daylight is Coming (2008–2010) ===
The band signed on with Word Records in early 2008 after being an independent band for nearly ten years. Their first non-independent studio album, Daylight is Coming, was released on August 26, 2008, on Word Records. The album was produced by Ian Eskelin. Remedy Drive's first official single "Daylight" was released to Christian CHR radio stations on May 23, 2008. Lead singer David Zach said about the song: "In Lord of the Rings, Gandalf said, ‘At dawn, look to the East’, and that's the message we're offering here: even in the most desperate times, each new day provides a glimmer of hope." On March 30, 2010, an Expanded Edition with three additional songs, and an EP with those three songs along with two remixes were released.

The Remedy Drive song "Hope" was used for the Vancouver Olympic Games commercial in 2009–2010. In early 2010, Remedy Drive's official website said that the band was creating new songs for an upcoming project, possibly a second album for Word Records. In 2010, Remedy Drive toured with the Rock and Worship Roadshow with artists such as David Crowder Band, MercyMe, Family Force 5, Fee, and Sidewalk Prophets.

=== Light Makes A Way EP (2011) ===
On May 2, 2011, a five-song EP was released entitled Light Makes A Way.

=== Resuscitate (2012–2013) ===
Remedy Drive signed with Centricity Music, and began working on their seventh studio album, entitled Resuscitate, which was released on September 18, 2012. On June 19, 2012, the band released their first single off the album, "Better Than Life," along with a lyric music video. The title song "Resuscitate" spent significant time at the top of Christian rock charts. In 2013, Remedy Drive released a follow-up album through Centricity Music, titled Resuscitate: Acoustic Sessions, which featured acoustic versions of the original album's 10 songs.

=== Commodity (2014–2015) ===
In 2014, David Zach stated that Commodity would be a counter-trafficking album to fight for freedom. The album was inspired by David Zach's undercover work in Southeast Asia to deliver impoverished youth from child slavery. The album also marked the first time David Zach had spoken to his brother Philip Zach in almost three years, who would also act as the producer and collaborator for the new album. This new album saw the band moving towards an independent path. Kickstarter was utilized to raise funding for the new album to reach listeners. Donations were accepted beginning on May 1 and the end of the donation period was May 31. The Commodity Kickstarter page was seeking $20,000 and the goal was surpassed and concluded having made $27,710. The first single was Commodity released on April 9 and it spent 16 weeks at number 1 on Christian rock radio. The album was released on September 23, 2014. In 2014, Dave Mohr left the band and was followed by Tim Buell in 2015.

=== Hope's Not Giving Up (2016) ===
Hope's Not Giving Up was released independently on September 2, 2016, and has new recordings of alternate versions 10 of their songs.

=== The North Star (2017–2018) ===
In 2017, the band started another Kickstarter campaign to raise $20,000 to produce a second counter-trafficking album. It was successful having raised $37,361. It was released on January 12, 2018.

=== Imago Amor and Living Room Anthology, Vol. 1 (2019–2021) ===
On May 19, 2020, Remedy Drive released an album in digital-only format, titled Living Room Anthology, Vol. 1, which featured piano and vocal-only versions of 9 other songs of theirs, as well as 2 additional unreleased songs. On January 29, 2021, the band released their third counter-trafficking album titled Imago Amor. On February 17, 2021, an acoustic edition of the song "Lovely" from Imago Amor was released via YouTube.

=== Scars to Prove It (2022–present) ===
On November 18, 2022, Remedy Drive released a single titled "Empress in Exile". On August 18, 2023, a second single, "Begin Again" was released. In 2024, Remedy Drive released four more singles, "Real Life" on April 12, "Steady" on May 31, "Lights Up" on July 12, and "Scars" on August 9.

In July, 2024, Remedy Drive announced via their website that Scars to Prove It comes out in August. On August 30, 2024, Scars to Prove It was released, featuring the last four singles, as well as alternate versions of "Empress in Exile" and "Begin Again".

For the 10th anniversary of Commodity, a limited-edition vinyl copy of the album was released.

== Members ==
=== Current members ===
- David Zach – lead vocals, keyboard, rhythm guitar (1995–Present)
- Timmy Jones – Drums (2011–2013, 2016–Present)
- Dave Mohr – Lead Guitar, Backing Vocals (2011–2014, 2022–Present)
- Philip Zach – Bass, Backing Vocals (1995–2010, 2014–2018, 2021–Present)
- Corey Horn – Bass, Backing Vocals (2011–present)
- Chris Sooter — Drums (2024-present)

=== Former members ===
- Paul Zach – Lead Guitar, Backing Vocals (1998–2010)
- Daniel Zach – Drums, Backing Vocals (1995–2010)
- Corey Horn – Bass, Backing Vocals (2011–2018)
- Tim Buell – Drums, Backing Vocals (2013–2015)
- Michael Sturd – Drums, (2015–2016)
- Zach Hunter – Drums, (2016–2017)

== Discography ==
=== Studio albums ===
List of studio albums, with selected chart positions and certifications
Title	Details	Peak chart positions		
Title	Details	US	US Christ	US Heat
Remedy	Released: 1998; Label: Independent; Formats: CD; Band Name: The Aslan Band	—	—	—
Remedy (the Blue One)	Released: 1999; Label: Independent; Formats: CD, digital download; Band name: Remedy	—	—	—
Remedy (the Red One)	Released: 2001; Label: Independent; Formats: CD, digital download; Band Name: Remedy	—	—	—
Remedy: A Live Album	Released: 2003; Label: Independent; Formats: CD, digital download; Band Name: Remedy	—	—	—
Magnify	Released: 2004; Label: Independent; Formats: CD, digital download; Band Name: Remedy	—	—	—
Rip Open the Skies	Released: April 25, 2006; Label: Independent; Formats: CD, digital download, streaming; Band Name: Remedy Drive	—	—	—
Daylight Is Coming	Released: August 36, 2008; Label: Word Records; Formats: CD, digital download, streaming; Band Name: Remedy Drive	119	5	—
Resuscitate	Released: September 28, 2012; Label: Centricity Music; Formats: CD, digital download, streaming; Band Name: Remedy Drive	—	23	20
Commodity	Released: September 23, 2014; Label: Independent; Formats: CD, LP, digital download, streaming; Band Name: Remedy Drive	—	34	—
The North Star	Released: January 12, 2018; Label: Independent; Formats: CD, digital download, streaming; Band Name: Remedy Drive	—	—	—
Imago Amor	Released: January 29, 2021; Label: Independent; Formats: CD, digital download, streaming; Band Name: Remedy Drive	—	—	—
Scars to Prove It	Released: August 30, 2024; Label: Independent; Formats: CD, LP, digital download, streaming; Band Name: Remedy Drive	—	—	—

=== Remix albums ===
- May 13, 2013: Resuscitate: The Acoustic Sessions - Centricity Music
- September 2, 2016: Hope's Not Giving Up - Independent
- 2020: The Living Room Anthology, Vol. 1 - Independent

=== EPs ===
- 2010: The Daylight EP - Word Records
- 2011: Light Makes a Way EP - independent
- 2026: Daylight United Studio Sessions - independent

== Singles ==
List of singles, with selected chart positions and certifications
Title	Year	Peak chart positions				Album
Title	Year	US Christ.	US Christ. AC	US Christ. CHR	US Christ. Rock	Album
"Daylight"	2008	—	—	19	—	Daylight is Coming
"Stand Up"	2008	—	—	8	6	Daylight is Coming
"All Along"	2008	10	6	1	—	Daylight is Coming
"Hearbeat"	2008	20	28	3	—	Daylight is Coming
"Speak to Me"	2010	32	28	22	—	Daylight is Coming: Expanded Edition
"Guide You Home"	2010	—	— (Note: "Guide You Home" did not enter the Billboard Christian Adult Contemporary, but peaked at No. 28 on the Christian AC Indie)	16	—	Daylight is Coming: Expanded Edition
"Better than Life"	2012	46	—	13	—	Resuscitate
"Resuscitate Me"	2012	—	—	—	1	Resuscitate
"Commodity"	2014	—	—	—	1	Commodity
"Dragons"	2021	—	—	—	—	Imago Amor
"Empress in Exile"	2022	—	—	—	—	Scars to Prove It
"Begin Again"	2023	—	—	—	—	Scars to Prove It
"Real Life"	2024	—	—	—	—	Scars to Prove It
"Steady"	2024	—	—	—	—	Scars to Prove It
"Lights Up"	2024	—	—	—	—	Scars to Prove It
"Scars"	2024	—	—	—	—	Scars to Prove It
"I Don't Belong to You"	2025	—	—	—	—	The North Star
"Brighter Than Apathy"	2025	—	—	—	—	The North Star

== Other charted songs ==
List of other charted songs, with selected chart positions and certifications
Title	Year	Peak chart positions	Album
Title	Year	US Christ Rock	Album
"Something Made to Last"	2008	10	Daylight is Coming
"Light Makes a Way"	2011	23	Light Makes a Way
"Make It Bright"	2012	— (Note: "Make It Bright" did not enter the R&R Christian Rock, but peaked at No. 1 on the BDS Christian Rock Recurrent.)	Resuscitate
"Dear Life"	2014	— (Note: "Dear Life" did not enter the R&R Christian Rock, but peaked at No. 6 on the BDS Christian Rock Recurrent.)	Commodity
"Warlike"	2018	— (Note: "Dear Life" did not enter the R&R Christian Rock, but peaked at No. 7 on the BDS Christian Rock National Airplay.)	The North Star
