= Ad Astra per Aspera (band) =

American indie rock band

Ad Astra Per Aspera
- Origin: Lawrence, Kansas, U.S.
- Genres: Indie rock, noise rock, punk rock
- Years active: 2001–present
- Labels: Big Brown Shark, Sonic Unyon, Love Garden Records
- Members: Julie Lane; Brooke Hunt; Kurt Lane; Mike Tuley; Scott Edwards
- Website: Adastraperaspera.com

Ad Astra Per Aspera is an American, Lawrence, Kansas-based indie rock and punk and tropical band, formed in 2001 and currently releasing records through Sonic Unyon Records and Love Garden Records. Their experimental and eclectic noise rock sound has drawn comparisons to bands such as Sonic Youth and the Pixies.

== Background ==
Ad Astra Per Aspera was born in Lawrence, Kansas in the fall of 2001. Their name comes from the State of Kansas motto which when translated from Latin means "To the Stars through Difficulties." The band consists of Mike Tuley (vocals/guitar), Kurt Lane (drums/percussion), Brooke Tuley (guitar/percussion), Julie Noyce (keyboards) and Scott Edwards (bass). Vocalist/guitarist Mike Tuley and guitarist Brooke Tuley were married in June 2010.

Ad Astra began playing live in the fall of 2002 quickly becoming part of the Lawrence music scene. They released their debut EP "An Introduction To" in April 2003. The follow-up EP "Cubic Zirconia" was released on Big Brown Shark Records in May 2004. After extensive touring the band signed to Sonic Unyon and was the subject of a two-part documentary on The Turnpike as they toured in support of their October 2006 full-length album "Catapult Calypso."

In October 2008 the band relocated to Brooklyn.

Ad Astra has previously played with such bands as The Thermals, Pretty Girls Make Graves, Minus Story, and Ghosty. After playing the 2007 South by Southwest festival they went on a national tour. They have recently released a new 7" single on the Love Garden label and are preparing for another American tour.

== Discography ==
Album	Release date
An Introduction To	2003
Cubic Zirconia EP	2004
Catapult Calypso	2006

== Reviews ==
- AllMusic Guide (3.5/5)
- IGN (9.2/10)
- Pitchfork Track Review – Voodoo Economics (3.5/5)
- Pitchfork Album Review – Catapult Calypso
- Music Emissions (4.5/5)
