= Imago Amor =

Studio album by Remedy Drive
- Released: January 9, 2021
- Genre: Christian rock, Christian pop, contemporary Christian, indie rock
- Length: 36:57
- Label: Independent
- Producer: Philip Zach

Remedy Drive chronology
Living Room Anthology, Vol. 1 (2020)	Imago Amor (2021)	Scars to Prove It (2024)

Imago Amor is the fourteenth studio album by American Christian rock band Remedy Drive. It was the third in a trilogy of counter-trafficking album, preceded by 2014's Commodity and 2018's The North Star. It was released on January 9, 2021. The album was produced and mixed by the band's co-founder, Philip Zach. According to the band's website, "The album celebrates the modern-day abolition movement and directs light towards the heroines and heroes on the front line of justice and freedom work." The album's name is Latin for "Image of Love."

== Critical reception ==
At 365 Days of Inspiring Media, Joshua Andre gave the album 4 out 5 stars, reviewing, "Even if you don’t believe in Jesus like these guys do… there’s still no reason why you can’t be encouraged and inspired by such a talented and gifted band."

Professional ratings
Review scores
Source	Rating
365 Days of Inspiring Media	4/5 stars

== Track listing ==
All tracks are written by David Zach, except where noted.

No.	Title	Writer(s)	Length
1.	"Dragons"		3:26
2.	"Imago Amor"		3:47
3.	"Lovely"		3:18
4.	"Caravan Princess"		5:46
5.	"Burn Bright"	D. Zach, Philip Zach	3:11
6.	"Time"		3:57
7.	"Pax Melodiam"	D. Zach, P. Zach	3:59
8.	"Using My Name"		3:14
9.	"Candle"		3:14
10.	"Blue"		3:21
Total length:			36:57

== Personnel ==
=== Remedy Drive ===
- David Zach – lead vocals, guitars, keys
- Philip Zach – bass, guitars, keys, percussion, background vocals
- Timmy Jones – drums on "Dragons", "Lovely", "Imago Amor", "Time", and "Pax Melodiam"

=== Additional musicians ===
- Corey Horn – Background vocals on "Imago Amor"
- Tim Buell – drums on "Burn Bright", "Candle", and "Blue"
- Ava Elizabeth – vocals on "Blue", "Candle", and "Imago Amor"

=== Production ===
- Philip Zach – producer, mixing
- Jason Germain – mastering
