= Minus Story =

American indie rock band

- Origin: Lawrence, Kansas, United States
- Genres: Indie rock, lo fi, neo-psychedelia
- Years active: 2000–present
- Labels: Jagjaguwar, Sensory Projects
- Members: Jordan Geiger; Nick Christus; Andy Byers; Brian Phillips; Mark Sanders; Lucas Oswald; Tyler French

Minus Story is an indie rock band based in Lawrence, Kansas. The core members of the band met growing up in Boonville, Missouri and are known for their off-kilter, sunny melodies and quirky instrumentation that forms the "wall of crap" sound. They are signed to the Jagjaguwar/Secretly Canadian label.

== Background ==
Minus Story roots begin in Boonville, Missouri with the meeting of guitarist, keyboardist, and vocalist Jordan Geiger and bassist Brian Phillips in kindergarten and a shared passion for dinosaurs. Later drummer Nick Christus was added in thanks to his Nintendo. Lastly guitarist Andy Byers was picked up from Geiger's Little League baseball team. After the four friends grew older and moved to nearby music scene Lawrence, Kansas they met guitarist Mark Sanders who joined the close-knit group. The band also uses drummer Tyler French in conjunction with Christus and keyboardist/guitarist Lucas Oswald. Minus Story has played with bands such as Deerhoof, Okkervil River, Ladyhawk, Ghosty, Ad Astra Per Aspera and The Appleseed Cast.

The band's unique "wall of crap" technique was created at a time when the band lacked the knowledge and equipment for a traditional sound. Instead they would layer unusual sounds on top of each other creating something more distinct.

== Hiatus ==
After touring in support of "My Ion Truss" (recorded at Electrical Audio in Chicago with John Congleton), the band entered a period of inactivity. During this time Geiger formed The Hospital Ships while other members pursued their own musical (and non-musical) interests. The band played an April 6, 2012 show as part of the Middle of the Map Fest in Kansas City, MO featuring the lineup of Jordan Geiger (vocals/guitar/keyboards), Nick Christus (drums), Andy Byers (guitar/keyboards/vocals), Brian Phillips (bass) and Taylor Holenbeck (guitar/vocals).

== Discography ==
Album	Release date
Belle Ame	(2001)
Moebius Syndrome	(2001)
The Captain Is Dead, Let the Drum Corpse Dance	(2004)
Heaven and Hell EP	(2005)
No Rest for Ghosts	(2005)
Make the Dead Come EP	(2007)
My Ion Truss	(2007)

== Reviews ==
- Six-Eyes
- Tiny Mix Tapes
- Pop Matters
