= Sekret (band) =

Russian rock band

Sekret Секрет
- Secret in 1985

Background information
- Origin: Russia
- Genres: Beat, rock and roll, psychedelic rock, protopunk, soft rock
- Years active: 1983–1991, 1991–1996, 1997, 1999, 2003, 2007, 2009–present

Sekret (Russian: Секрет, lit.: Secret) was a Soviet Russian rock and roll band founded in 1982 in Leningrad. The band's musical style and image were inspired from 1950s and 1960s western music, in particular by the Beatles. The band's name was inspired by the Beatles song 'Do You Want to Know a Secret?'. Over their career, they released 9 albums, 1 single, and 1 EP. The last album they released was Все это и есть любовь, which was in 2014.

The original lineup lasted until 1990, when frontman Maxim Leonidov emigrated to Israel. The band continued with different lineups without great success, but nevertheless continued actively making music until 2014.

Their 1980s hits continue to receive airplay on Russian FM stations.

== Original members ==
- Maxim Leonidov – vocals, rhythm-guitar, keyboards (1983–1990, 1997, 1999, 2003, 2007, 2012, 2013–present)
- Nikolai Fomenko – vocals, bass-guitar (1983–1996, 1997, 1999, 2003, 2007, 2010–present)
- Andrey Zabludovskiy – vocals, lead-guitar, viola (1983–present)
- Aleksey Murashov – vocals, drums, percussion (1983–1998, 1999, 2003, 2007, 2010–present)

== Discography ==
Transliterated title	Original title	Translation	Year of release
Ty i ya	Ты и я	You and Me	1984
Secret	Секрет	Secret	1987
Leningradskoe vremya	Ленинградское время	Leningrad Time	1989
Orkestr v puti	Оркестр в пути	Orchestra En Route	1991
Ne perezhivay	Не переживай	Don't worry	1994
Blues de Moscou		Moscow Blues	1996
Pyat'	Пять	Five	1997
Secret 30 (Singl)	Секрет 30 (Сингл)	Secret 30 (EP)	2013
Vsyo eto i jest' lyubov'	Всё это и есть любовь	All This is Love	2014
