= Maxim Leonidov =

Soviet-Russian musician (born 1962)

- Максим Леонидов
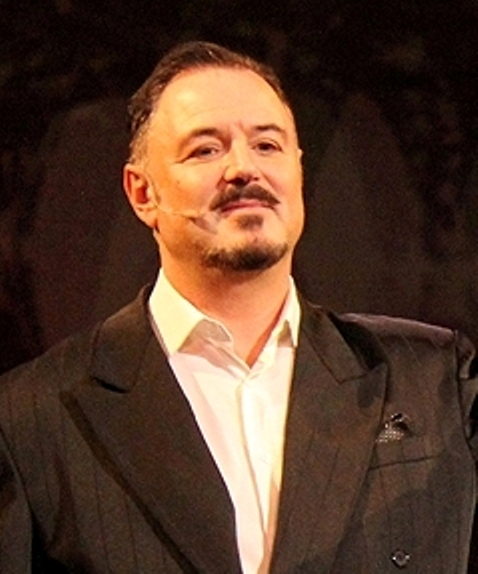
- Born: Maxim Leonidovich Leonidov; February 13, 1962 (age 64); Leningrad, Soviet Union
- Occupations: Singer, musician, actor, TV host
- Years active: 1983–present
- Musical career
- Genres: Rock
- Website: Official website

Maxim Leonidovich Leonidov (Russian: Максим Леонидович Леонидов; born February 13, 1962) is a Soviet and Russian musician, singer, actor, songwriter and TV presenter. He is known as one of the founders and members of the beat-quartet Sekret, and subsequently as a solo artist. In 1997, he won the Golden Gramophone Award.

== Biography ==
Maxim Leonidovich Leonidov was born into a family of actors of the Leningrad Academic Comedy Theater. He was the son of Lyudmila Lyulko (July 10, 1923 - October 25, 1967) and one of the pioneers in theater Leonid Yefimovich Leonidov, whose real name was Shapiro (March 27, 1927 - April 30, 1996).

In 1979, Leonidov finished the Glinka Choral School attached to the Leningrad State Academic Chapel. In 1983, he graduated from the Russian State Institute of Performing Arts, under the tutelage of Arkady Katsman and Lev Dodin. He served in the army, being a member of the Song and Dance Ensemble of the Leningrad Military District, along with Nikolai Fomenko and Yevgeny Oleshev. Later that year, he became one of the founders of the popular Sekret beat-quartet (Maxim Leonidov, Nikolai Fomenko, Andrei Zabludovsky, Alexei Murashov). After six successful years, he left the group in 1989 and began a solo career.

In late 1990, along with his first wife, Irina Selezneva, he immigrated to Israel. Until 1996 he lived and worked in Tel Aviv, after which he returned to St. Petersburg. Periodically Leonidov collaborated with Sekret (mainly during the group's jubilees). In 2012, the musicians began to record new songs, and in 2013, they released their first album,16 years after Sekret 30.

On February 13, 2015, at the Mongolian embassy in Russia, Leonidov received the "For the Motherland" award of the First Degree on his birthday. It was bestowed after a May 2014 tour in Mongolia to celebrating the 75th anniversary of the victory at Khalkhin-Gol against the Japanese. On the same day, he received the Chart Dozen prize as part of the Sekret beat-quartet.

In 2022, he opposed the Russian invasion of Ukraine, Then he moved back to Israel.

== Personal life ==
His first wife was Irina Selezneva. In September 1999, he married his second wife, actress Anne Banshchikova. They divorced in 2003. He is currently married to Alexandra Kamchatova, an actress in the Lensovet Theatre. He has two children - a daughter named Maria born in 2004 and a son named Leonid born in 2008.

== Hippoband ==
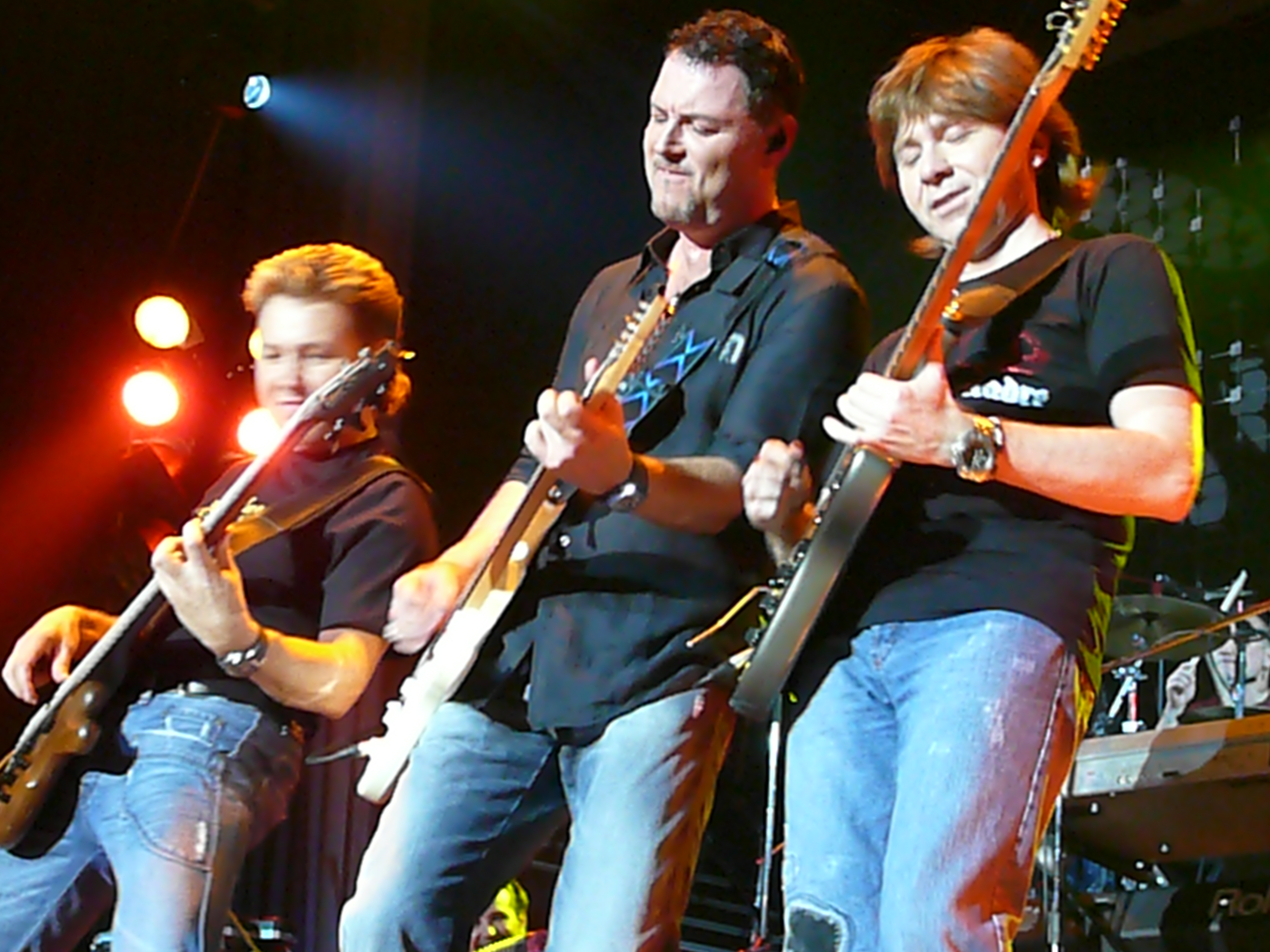
HippoBand — Yuri Guriev, Maxim Leonidov, Vladimir Gustov

=== History of the group ===
Leonidov's group Hippoband was founded in March 1996, after he returned from Israel. They held their first concert in May the same year.The group's current name was devised in 2003 with the release of their album Hippopotazm. The album was named after Hippopotam, a song included in it. According to the musicians, Gustov had accidentally made a typo of the letter "Z" while typing the name of the song in the computer, after which the musicians decided to call themselves Hippoband. The group's logo was decorated with a hippopotamus, their totemic animal. The band's membership has remained stable since 1997, except when their first drummer Evgeny Lependin moved to Moscow to work with Vladimir Presnyakov Jr., and his place was taken by a young musician named Yuri Sonin.

==== Permanent group formation ====
- Maxim Leonidov - vocals, songwriter, guitar.
- Vladimir Gustov - guitar, vocals, arrangement. composer, guitarist harmonica and arranger. Most of the Hippoband albums have been recorded at his studio, 'Favourite'
- Evgeny Oleshev - keyboard, vocals, arrangement. He was Leonidov's choral school classmate.
- Yuri Guryev - bass guitar, vocals, group director.
- Yuri Sonin - drums
- Evgeny Guriev - guitar

==== Sessional musicians ====
- Valery Shurygin - button accordion
- Mikhail Zhidkikh - saxophone
- Yoel Gonzalez - percussion
- Pavel Ivanov - percussion
- Vitaly Pogosyan - duduk

=== Group discography ===
- 1996 - "Commander"
- 1997 - "Sailing Over the City"
- 1999 - "Do not let him go"
- 2000 - "The best songs of 1985-2000"
- 2001 - "Let's light up!" (An album of military songs)
- 2001 - Thursday
- 2003 - Hippopotazm
- 2004 - "146 minutes in Russia" (live album)
- 2006 - "Fundamentals of Feng Shui"
- 2008 - "The World for Mary"
- 2009 - "The Wild Thing"
- 2009 - "House on the Mountain" (live album)
- 2011 - "The Daddies of the Song"
- 2017 - "Above"

=== Solo discography ===
==== Released albums ====
- 1987 - "Recognition", "Melody". Mini-record, including four songs by composer Yakov Dubravin, performed by Leonidov.
- 1992 - מקסים (Maxim). The first of two albums released in Israel, Leonidov's only album in Hebrew.
- 1994 - "Highway of Memories". Leonidov's second album released in Israel, this time in Russian.
- 1996 - "Commander". Album marking Leonidov's return to Russia. Recorded with session musicians, the album was produced by Alexander Kutikov, who worked in his time with "The Secret" on the recording of the band's first album.
- 2009 - The Wild Thing. Leonidov recorded a new album with ex-compatriot, and now Canadian citizen Kirill Shirokov
- 2016 - The Best. Leonidov recorded a new album, which included new songs and old hits. The album included 30 songs.

==== Unreleased albums ====
In 1990, after leaving Sekret, Leonidov's solo album was recorded with the group "Collected Works". It had six songs in English, but there is no information that it was ever released on a record or CD.

==== Albums with other artists ====
- 2000 - "Terrarium - Pentagonal sin", recorded together with Boris Grebenshchikov, Chizh & Co, Vyacheslav Butusov, Alexander Vasilyev and musicians of Aquarium
- 2003 - "A thin scar on my beloved pope", recorded together with Andrey Makarevich, Evgeny Margulis, Alyona Sviridova, Tatyana Lazareva and "Creole Tango Orchestra"

==== Sales ====
According to Pittsburgh Post-Gazette, his first two albums sold 5.5 million in the Soviet Union.

== Awards ==
- 1997 - "Song of the Year", for the song "Vision"
- 1997 - Golden Gramophone Award, for the song "Vision"
- 2009 - National Award "Musical Heart of the Theater" in the nomination "Best Performer of the Main Role" for the role of Max Bialostok in the musical "Producers".
- 2010 - "Chart Dozen", for the song "Letter" in the nomination "Poetry"

== Selected filmography ==
- 2003 — Deadly Force as Belov
- 2011 — Vysotsky. Thank You For Being Alive as Pavel Leonidov
- 2012 — The White Guard as officer
