= Vysotsky. Thank You For Being Alive =

Vysotsky. Thank You for Being Alive
- Directed by: Pyotr Buslov
- Screenplay by: Nikita Vysotsky
- Produced by: Konstantin Ernst; Anatoly Maksimov; Michael Schlicht; Nikita Vysotsky
- Starring: Sergey Bezrukov; Oksana Akinshina; Andrey Smolyakov; Ivan Urgant; Maksim Leonidov; Andrey Panin
- Cinematography: Igor Grinyakin
- Production companies: Columbia Pictures; Monumental Pictures
- Distributed by: Walt Disney Studios Sony Pictures Releasing
- Release date: December 1, 2011
- Running time: 1 hour 12 minutes
- Country: Russia
- Language: Russian
- Budget: $12,000,000 (estimated)
- Box office: $27,400,000

Vysotsky. Thank You for Being Alive (Russian: Высоцкий. Спасибо, что живой) is a 2011 Russian drama film about Vladimir Vysotsky based on a screenplay by his son Nikita and directed by Pyotr Buslov. The primary actor, who played the role of Vysotsky, went uncredited and remained unknown to public. Later, it was revealed that CGI and heavy makeup disguised Sergey Bezrukov. The film premiered on December 1, 2011.

== Plot summary ==
Film is based on a true story about a Vysotsky concert tour to Uzbekistan and subsequent clinical death in 1979.

== Cast ==
- Sergey Bezrukov as Vladimir Vysotsky (uncredited), also appearing as Yura, colleague of Vysotsky.
  Nikita Vysotsky as Vladimir Vysotsky's voice
- Oksana Akinshina as Tatiana Ivleva, girlfriend of Vysotsky
- Andrey Smolyakov as Viktor Bekhteev, KGB Colonel in Uzbekistan
- Ivan Urgant as Seva Kulagin, friend of Vysotsky
- Maxim Leonidov as Pavel Leonidov, manager and friend of Vysotsky
- Vladimir Ilyin as KGB Colonel from Moscow
- Andrei Panin as Anatoly Nefedov, personal doctor of Vysotsky
- Dmitry Astrakhan as Leonid Fridman, concert manager in Uzbekistan, who invited Vysotsky
- Anna Ardova as Isabella Yurievna, Director of the House of Culture of Uzbekistan
- Vladimir Menshov as Taganka Theater stage director (portrayed Yury Lyubimov)
- Alla Pokrovskaya as Nina Maksimovna, mother of Vladimir Vysotsky
- Sergey Shakurov as Semyon Vladimirovich, father of Vladimir Vysotsky

== Production ==
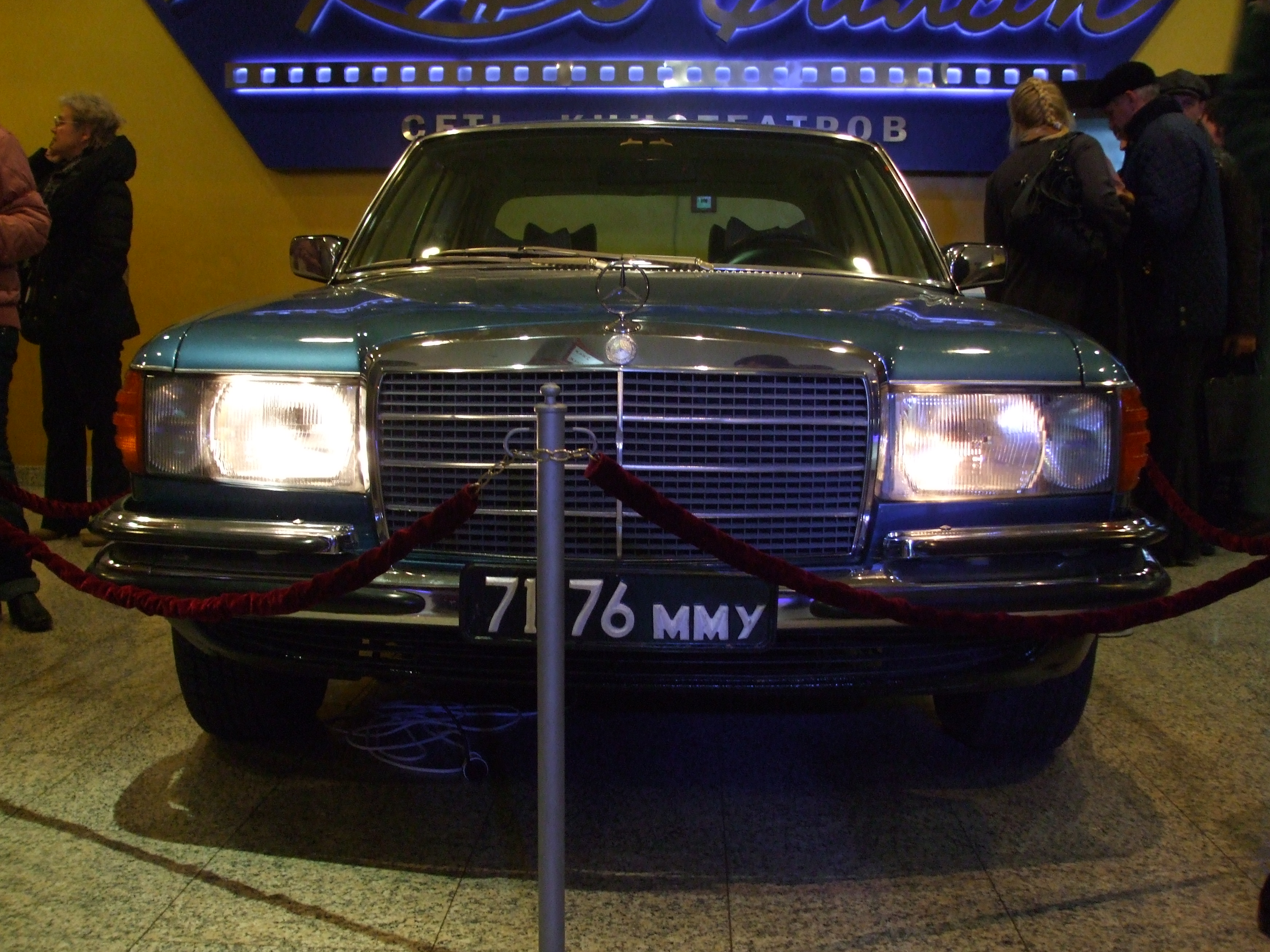
A copy of famous Vysotsky automobile Mercedes-Benz W116 in Moscow cinema theater (original car was sold after his death)

- The actor who played Vysotsky spent 4 – 6 hours every day for make-up and about 1 - 1.5 hours to undo the make-up. In some sets Vysotsky was "reconstructed" for the film with the use of CGI.
- In spring 2012 Sergey Bezrukov admitted in a TV talk show that he in fact was the actor who played the role of Vladimir Vysotsky. Also, for the extended TV version released in January 2013, Bezrukov was credited for the role of Vysotsky.

== Reception ==
The film received mixed reviews, with many criticizing the decision to have the actor portraying Vysotsky to wear a mask. Also Vysotsky's last wife Marina Vlady has commented negatively on the film, saying that the film is "An insult to Vysotsky, his art, his memory and our life together".
