= Galaxy (Dannii Minogue song) =

Single by Dannii Minogue
- Released: 10 November 2017
- Recorded: 2017
- Genre: Dance-pop; nu-disco
- Length: 3:58
- Label: Shiny Disco Productions
- Songwriters: Sia Furler; Rene Arenault; Bill Mohler
- Producer: Ian Masterson

Dannii Minogue singles chronology
"Holding On" (2017)	"Galaxy" (2017)	"All I Wanna Do 2020" (2020)

Music video
- "Galaxy" on YouTube

"Galaxy" is a song performed by Australian singer-songwriter Dannii Minogue. It was released worldwide on 10 November 2017.

== Background ==
In June 2017, after the release of "Holding On", Minogue said she would be releasing more music before the end of the year, in order to coincide with her appearance as a special guest on Take That's Australian tour.

"Galaxy" was written by Australian singer-songwriter Sia but was not included on any of her albums. It was later presented to Minogue by Sia's manager while she was looking for recording studios in Los Angeles.

Dannii said the song was "classic Sia" with "huge vocal with beautiful melodies" and that she was "feeling the joy and happiness" of it and "could see why this wouldn't go with what Sia was doing" as her album features "really moody" lyrics. Minogue also said that the experience of sending her version to Sia was "nerve-wrecking" [sic] but the songwriter "really liked it".

The single announcement was made on Minogue's Instagram profile on 3 November along with the artwork. On the same day, pre-order links for the songs were made available on all major digital music services.

== Music video ==
On 9 November a music video for the song was made available on Minogue's official YouTube channel. The video was produced by Melbourne-based company Robot Army Productions and was directed by Nick W Lord.

== Track listing ==
These are the formats and track listings of major single releases of "Galaxy".

Single

1. "Galaxy" – 3:58

Chris Young Remix

1. "Galaxy" (Chris Young Remix) – 5:01

Gawler Remix

1. "Galaxy" (Gawler Remix) – 5:45
2. "Galaxy" (Gawler Remix Radio Edit) – 3:44

== Personnel ==
Credits adapted from YouTube.

- Dannii Minogue – lead vocals
- Sia Furler – songwriter
- Rene Arenault – songwriter
- Bill Mohler – songwriter
- Ian Masterson for Thriller Jill – producer and mixer
- James Hurr – additional programming
- Joe Holweger – guitar and bass
- Robot Army Productions – video
- Nick W Lord – creative director
- Celeste Ben Jackson – hair and make-up
