= Seven Star Hotel =

Studio album by Be Good
- Released: April 30, 2009
- Recorded: Favourite Studio; 2008 - 2009
- Genre: Pop-rock
- Length: 42:15

Be Good chronology
See U Tonite (2006)	Seven Star Hotel (2009)

«Seven Star Hotel» is the fourth studio album by the Russian pop rock band Be Good.

== Track listing ==
No.	Title	Authors	Length
1.	"Teachers' Pet"	Vladimir Gustov, Igor Balakirev	3:12
2.	"Maria"	Vladimir Gustov, Igor Balakirev	3:50
3.	"Seven Star Hotel"	Vladimir Gustov, Igor Balakirev	3:39
4.	"Keep on Playing your Guitar"	Vladimir Gustov, Igor Balakirev	3:07
5.	"Only the Good Die Young"	Vladimir Gustov, Igor Balakirev	4:04
6.	"I Swear"	Vladimir Gustov, Igor Balakirev	3:04
7.	"Still The Best"	Vladimir Gustov, Igor Balakirev	3:05
8.	"Crying for the Moon"	Vladimir Gustov, Igor Balakirev	4:23
9.	"Hey Girl"	Vladimir Gustov, Igor Balakirev	3:46
10.	"Selfishness"	Vladimir Gustov, Igor Balakirev, Eric Shirjaev	2:33
11.	"What About You"	Vladimir Gustov, Igor Balakirev	3:05
12.	"Gone"	Vladimir Gustov, Igor Balakirev	4:27

=== Bonus tracks ===
No.	Title	Authors	Length
13.	"Hold On"	Vladimir Gustov, Igor Balakirev	2:58
14.	"Natalie"	Vladimir Gustov, Igor Balakirev	3:52

== Personnel ==
- Vladimir Gustov - guitars, keyboards, bass, vocals, percussion, production, programming
- Igor Balakirev - vocals
- Boris Majorov - bass (12)
- Peter Miheev - drums (12)
