= No Rest for Ghosts =

No Rest For Ghosts

Studio album by Minus Story
- Released: 2005
- Length: 47:07

No Rest For Ghosts is an album by Minus Story, released in 2005.

== Track listing ==
1. "I Was Hit" – 5:53
2. "Knocking on Your Head" – 3:09
3. "Ringing in the Dark" – 5:04
4. "Hold On" – 4:36
5. "Little Wet Head" – 4:22
6. "Waking Up" – 5:58
7. "Will I Be Fighting?" – 5:02
8. "There Is a Light" – 4:09
9. "To the Ones You Haunted" – 4:27
10. "In Our Hands" – 4:27
