= Scars to Prove It =

Studio album by Remedy Drive
- Released: August 30, 2024
- Genre: Contemporary Christian, Christian Rock, Christian Pop, Alternative Rock, Indie Rock
- Length: 33:55
- Label: Independent
- Producer: David Zach

Remedy Drive chronology
| Imago Amor (2021) | Scars to Prove It (2024) | Daylight United Studio Sessions (2026) |

Professional ratings
Review scores
| Source | Rating |
|---|---|
| Jesus Freak Hideout | 4.5/5 stars |

Scars to Prove It is the fifteenth studio album by American Christian rock band Remedy Drive. It was released independently on August 30, 2024. It is in digital download, LP, and CD formats. The album includes one instrumental track, "GilEstel", which means 'Star of High Hope', and is possibly a reference to the works of J.R.R. Tolkien. The album was produced by the band's co-founder David Zach.

== Background ==
The song "Don't Wait" was previously released in 2011 on the Light Makes a Way EP, under the name "Don't Wait Too Long". It was redone as the album's seventh track. On November 18, 2022, the song "Empress in Exile" was released as a non-album single. An alternate version of the song was used as the album's ninth track. On August 18, 2023, 'Begin Again" was released as a non-album single. The song was redone and used as the tenth track of the album. In 2024, three non-album singles were released, "Real Life" on April 12, "Steady" on May 31, "Lights Up" on July 12, and "Scars" on August 9, which were released as tracks in the album. The opening track, "Cover Me", was a variation of the song "You Cover Me", released on Living Room Anthology, Vol. 1 in 2020.

== Critical reception ==
With a four and a half star review, Alex Caldwell of Jesus Freak Hideout stated, "Scars to Prove It is an epic listen from start to finish, and clearly a labor of love from the band to its long-time fans. And it is also the best album that you will likely hear this year."

== Track listing ==
All tracks are written by David Zach, except where noted.

| No. | Title | Writer(s) | Length |
|---|---|---|---|
| 1. | "Cover Me" | David Zach; David Wyatt; Paul Zach; Toby McKeehan | 3:41 |
| 2. | "Scars" | | 3:33 |
| 3. | "Real Life" | | 2:35 |
| 4. | "GilEstel" (instrumental) | | 2:25 |
| 5. | "Steady" | | 3:16 |
| 6. | "Lights Up" | | 3:42 |
| 7. | "Don't Wait" | | 3:58 |
| 8. | "Empty Spaces" | | 4:33 |
| 9. | "Empress in Exile" | | 3:20 |
| 10. | "Begin Again" | | 2:47 |
| Total length: | | | 33:55 |

== Personnel ==
=== Remedy Drive ===
- David Zach – lead vocals, keyboards, guitars
- Dave Mohr – guitars
- Timmy Jones – drums, backing vocals
- Philip Zach – bass guitar, backing vocals

=== Production ===
- David Zach – producer, mixing
- Jason Germain – mastering
