= Moguai discography =

The following is a discography of Moguai, a German electronic dance music musician.

== Albums ==
Release	Title	Album details	Label
2010	We Ar Lyve	Released: May 10, 2010; Label: Mau5trap; Formats: Digital download, CD	Mau5trap
2012	Mpire	Released: February 28, 2012; Label: Mau5trap; Formats: Digital download, CD	Mau5trap
2021	Colors	Released: October 1, 2021; Label: Punx Records; Formats: Digital download, CD	Punx

== Singles ==
Release	Title	Artist	Label
1994	Best Before End EP	Moguai	Important Records
1995	Torque Flight	Moguai	Important Records
1997	Suicide Commando	Echopark	Fuel/Eastwest
1998	Beatbox/Higher	Dial M for Moguai	Superfly/Kosmo
1998	Bang the Drum	Dial M for Moguai	Superfly/Kosmo
1998	The Final	Phil Fuldner	Superfly/Kosmo
1999	Go high/Are you different	Dial M for Moguai	Punx/Kosmo
1999	King of Rock	Dial M for Moguai	Kosmo
1999	S Express	Phil Fuldner	Punx/Kosmo
2000	Into Another	Talla 2XLC calls Moguai	Tetsuo
2000	Miami Pop	Phil Fuldner	Kosmo
2001	Supernatural	Nature One Inc.	Fuel/Eastwest
2001	The Rock	Moguai pres. Punx	PUNX/Eastwest
2001	U Know Y	Moguai	PUNX/BMG/ Ministry of Sound Australia
2002	Get:On	Moguai	PUNX/Superstar/ Ministry of Sound Australia
2003	Gipsy	Gipsy	Polo/Silly Spider
2003	Freaks	Moguai	PUNX/Superstar/ Ministry of Sound Australia
2004	In the Middle	Sugababes	Universal/World
2004	Old N New/ Go ahead	Moguai	PUNX/Superstar
2005	Y.E.A.H.	PUNX	PUNX
2005	Live at the Kink Australia	Romeo Engine	PUNX
2005	Sasha (Sex Secret)	Moguai and 2Raumwohnung	Punx/It Sounds/Sony BMG
2006	I want, I need, I love	Moguai for Sensation White	PUNX/ID and T/ Kontor
2006	Tonight	Moguai	PUNX
2006	Ataque	Moguai	PUNX
2007	Freaks 2007	Moguai and Tocadisco	Superstar
2007	Robot Soul	Moguai	Superstar
2007	Something Kinda Ooh	Girls Aloud	Universal
2007	Fling	Girls Aloud	Universal
2007	The Beat Goes On	Guiamo	Hope
2008	Diamond Back/Ray	Moguai and Zenker	BluFin
2008	Kick Out The Jam	Moguai	PUNX/IO Music
2008	Sittin on Chrome	Moguai	miKontor
2008	Still Sittin on Chrome	Moguai vs. Sebastian Ingrosso	Refune
2008	Wild Thing	Moguai vs. Tone Loc	Delicious Vinyl
2008	Beat Box	Dial M for Moguai	PUNX
2009	The Trip	Moguai	Toca 45
2009	ZYVOX	Moguai	Mau5trap
2009	Lyve/Impereal	Moguai	Mau5trap
2009	I.D.Y. (I Dance You)	Moguai	PUNX
2009	Oyster	Moguai	Mau5trap
2010	Nyce/Blau	Moguai	Mau5trap
2010	8001/Stay Planetary EP	Moguai	Mau5trap
2010	Get Fresh	Moguai	Skint Records
2010	We Want Your Soul	Moguai	Size Records
2011	Original Hardcore	Moguai and WestBam	Skint Records
2011	Optinuum	Moguai	Mau5trap
2011	Beat of the Drum featuring SOFI	Moguai	Mau5trap
2011	Ya Mama (Push The Tempo)	Fatboy Slim vs. Moguai	Skint Records
2011	Oxygen featuring Fiora	Moguai	Mau5trap
2012	Mpire	Moguai	Mau5trap
2012	Lyme (Moguai's Crushed Lyme Mix)	Moguai	Mau5trap
2012	In n'Out (Tommy Trash Club Mix)	Moguai and Tommy Trash	Mau5trap
2012	Brunette	AN21 and Max Vangeli and Moguai	SIZE Records
2013	Mammoth	Dimitri Vegas & Like Mike and Moguai	Spinnin' Records
2013	Champs	Moguai	SIZE Records
2013	PunkOmat	Moguai	Punx Records
2013	When I Rock	Moguai	Punx Records
2013	Can't Stop featuring Niles Mason	Moguai	Spinnin' Records
2014	ACIIID	Moguai	Spinnin' Records
2014	The Future	Moguai	Punx Records
2014	Real Life	TST and Moguai and Amba Shepherd	Musical Freedom
2014	K I X S	Moguai	Spinnin' Records
2015	The Zound (Energy Flash)	Moguai, Joey Beltram and Cobra Effect	Fly Eye Records
2015	Portland	Watermät and Moguai	Spinnin' Records
2015	Hold On	Moguai featuring Cheat Codes	Spinnin' Deep
2016	Save Tonight	Robin Schulz and Moguai featuring Solamay	Tonspiel / Warner
2016	You'll See Me	Moguai featuring Tom Cane	Tonspiel / Warner
2016	One Day Hero (Moguai Edit)	One Day Hero featuring Lions Head	Spinnin' Deep
2016	Pray for Rain	Moguai	Tonspiel/Warner
2017	Tinhauser	Moguai	Spinnin' Deep
2017	Satisfied	Moguai and AKA AKA	Enormous Tunes
2017	Say A Little Prayer	Moguai and Polina	Spinnin' Deep
2017	Bright Light	Moguai and Tinlicker	Mau5trap
2018	Lee	Moguai and Zonderling	Heldeep Records
2018	Home	Moguai and AKA AKA	Axtone Records
2018	Sometimes	Moguai and Raumakustik	Spinnin' Deep
2018	I Like It	Moguai and Macon	Heldeep Records
2018	Arcade Mammoth	Dimtri Vegas and Like Mike vs. Moguai and W&W	Smash The House
2018	The Greatest Speech	Moguai and Raumakustik featuring The Great Dictator	Spinnin' Deep
2018	Tetra	Moguai	Spinnin' Deep
2019	Faith	Moguai and Luciana	Heldeep Records / Spinnin' Records
2019	Cucumba	Oliver Heldens and Moguai	Heldeep Records
2019	Don't Stop	Moguai and Moe Mitchell	Spinnin' Records
2019	Everybody's Got to Learn Sometime	Moguai	Heldeep
2019	Green Sally Up	Moguai	Big Beat Records
2019	Commander	Moguai	Spinnin' Deep
2020	DT64	Moguai and Kai Tracid	Heldeep
2020	Commander For The Night	Moguai	Spinnin' Records
2020	Spring	Moguai	Self-released
2020	Sad Boy, Happy Girl / Lyfe Lyne	Moguai and Rebecca & Fiona	720Mau5
2020	Happiness	Moguai, Ilira and Tomcraft	Spinnin' Records
2021	Nitro	Moguai, Selva and Bright Sparks	Controversia
2021	Next To You	Moguai featuring Jasmine Pace	Punx Records
2021	Adventures of Babylon	Moguai featuring Dissolut	Dim Mak Records

== Remixes ==
Release	Title	Artist	Label
1999	Sketches in the Spring	Cosmic Baby	Intercord
1999	To the Rhythm	Yves Deruyter	Bonzai Records
1999	Too Much Rain	United DJs for Central America	CDL
1999	Overdrive	DJ Sandy vs. Housetrap	Kosmo
2000	Feel it	Inaya Day	Positiva UK
2000	The Baguio Track	Luzon	Yoshitoshi Records
2000	Light Speed	Oliver Lieb	DATA
2001	7Colours	Lost Witness	EMI
2001	Island	Orinoko	Dance Division
2001	I'm Not Homesick	Santos	ZYX Music
2002	Emerge	Fischerspooner	Ministry of Sound USA
2002	Ich Und Elaine	2Raumwohnung	It Sounds/Sony BMG
2002	Lazy	Xpress 2 vs. David Byrn	Skint Records
2003	Who Said (Stuck in the UK)	Planet Funk	Illustrious/Sony UK
2005	Die Nacht	Schiller and Thomas D	Universal Music
2005	Geht's Noch	Roman Flügel	Cocoon Recordings
2006	Casino	NU NRG	Vandit Records
2006	Nichts Von Alledem (Tut Mir Leid)	Rosenstolz	Universal Music
2006	Sweet Child of Mine	Flat Pack	We Play
2007	Freak in the Morning	Tocadisco	
2008	1, 2, 3...	Alexander Marcus	Kontor
2008	Cracks	Meat Katie	Lot49
2008	Tabasco	Kohlbecker and Eilmes	We Play
2009	This Must Be It	Röyksopp	Wall of sound
2009	Hell Yeah	UAF Anthem	Sony Music AU
2009	Release Me	Agnes	Warner Music
2009	Leave Me Amor	Ryskee	We Play
2009	Float My Boat	Lazy Jay	BigandDirty/We Play/News
2009	Supply And Demand	Fischerspooner	DIM MAK USA
2009	Slide	Funkerman	Flamingo Records
2009	Quadrillion	Big World featuring Markus Binapfl	PUNX
2009	Let's Get Bleeped Tonight	Dada Life	Big and Dirty
2009	One Time We Lived	Moby	Little Idiot
2010	Dynamik	Michael Woods	Mau5trap
2010	Song for a Girl	Moonbeam	Blackhole Recordings
2010	Black Magic	The Green Children	Knightingale
2011	Get on You	Xpress 2	Skint Records
2011	Zaman	Felix Da Housecat	Doorn Records
2011	Bangduck	Afrojack	Wall Recordings
2011	Diamond Jigsaw	Underworld	OM Recordings
2011	I Wanna Go	Britney Spears	JIVE
2011	Never Will Be Mine	Rye Rye and Robyn	Interscope USA
2011	Best Thing I've Never Had	Beyoncé	JIVE
2012	I'm Not Leaving	The Crystal Method featuring Martha Reeves and The Funk Bros	Tiny E Music
2012	Keep Running The Melody	Wally Lopez featuring Kreesha Turner	EMI Spain
2012	Dark Side	Kelly Clarkson	RCA Records
2012	Steve Jobs	Steve Aoki featuring Angger Dimas	Ultra Records
2012	Extreme Ways (Bourne's Legacy)	Moby	Little Idiot
2013	You Need the Drugs	WestBam	Vertigo Records
2015	White Clouds	DVBBS	Spinnin' Remixes
2015	Show Me Love	Robin Schulz and J.U.D.G.E.	Tonspiel
2015	Save Tonight	Robin Schulz featuring Solamay	Tonspiel
2016	Blind	Feder featuring Emmi	Feder
2017	Momentuum	One Day Hero	AFTR:HRS
2017	Donderdag	Tinlicker	Mau5trap
2018	This Mountain	Faouzia	Warner Canada
2019	Summer Lover	Oliver Heldens featuring Devin and Nile Rodgers	Kangarooli Tracks
2019	Break My Broken Heart	Winona Oak	Atlantic Recording
2020	Hold On	Moguai featuring Cheat Codes	Spinnin' Records

== Compilations ==
Release	Title	Artist	Label
1996	The Club Tribune	Moguai	SPV
1999	Cosmonauts by Moguai	Moguai	BMG
1999	Dorian Grey Techno Club	Moguai	Sony Music
2002	Headliners	Moguai	Ministry of Sound
2002	Live at the K	Ministry of Sound Australia	
2005	Worldleague Vol. I	Moguai	Silly spider
2007	Sea of Love Vol. I	Moguai	Big City Beats
2008	I Am X	Moguai	PUNX/Kontor
2009	Punx Up The Volume	Moguai	Ministry of Sound
2011	Lyve From Beta Denver	Moguai	Mau5trap

== Sample packs ==
Release	Title	Artist	Label
2009	The Sample Boutique	Moguai pres. Loopmasters	Loopmasters
2011	Lyve Elements	Moguai	Mau5trap/Sample to Sample
