= Holding On (Dannii Minogue song) =

Single by Dannii Minogue featuring Jason Heerah
- Released: 11 August 2017
- Recorded: 2016
- Genre: Dance-pop
- Length: 3:28
- Label: Shiny Disco Productions
- Songwriters: Anthony Maniscalco; Dannii Minogue; Lionel Towers
- Producer: Hook n Sling

Dannii Minogue singles chronology
"100 Degrees" (2015)	"Holding On" (2017)	"Galaxy" (2017)

Music video
- "Holding On" (Lyric video) on YouTube

"Holding On" is a song performed by Australian singer-songwriter Dannii Minogue. It was released worldwide on 11 August 2017 and features vocals by The X Factor finalist Jason Heerah.

== Background ==
In April 2016, it was announced that Dannii Minogue would be a special guest act on Culture Club's Australian tour that would happen later that year. In June, during a warm-up gig at a Melbourne nightclub called GH Hotel, Minogue performed "Holding On" as a duet with Heerah. Later that month, during her opening act for the Culture Club concert at Rod Laver Arena, Minogue and Heerah performed the song again.

The song did not see an official release until the following year. In August 2017, it was announced that Dannii Minogue would be supporting Take That during their Australian tour. Before the tour, however, Minogue decided to release a "crisp version" of the song on the same day she performed it live at the Central Station Records 40th anniversary party.

== Track listing ==
These are the formats and track listings of major single releases of "Holding On".

Single

1. "Holding On" (featuring Jason Heerah) – 3:27

Extended mix

1. "Holding On" (featuring Jason Heerah) [Extended Mix] – 6:16
