= Resuscitate (album) =

Studio album by Remedy Drive
- Released: September 18, 2012
- Recorded: 2012
- Studio: The Bomb Shelter (Brentwood, TN)
- Genre: Contemporary Christian music, Christian rock, indie rock
- Length: 36:29
- Label: Centricity Music
- Producer: Peter Kipley

Remedy Drive chronology
| Light Makes a Way EP (2011) | Resuscitate (2012) | Commodity (2014) |

Singles from Resuscitate
- 1. "Better Than Life" Released: July 24, 2012; 2. "Resuscitate Me" Released: 2012

Alternative cover
- Resuscitate: The Acoustic Sessions

Resuscitate is the third studio album by contemporary Christian music band Remedy Drive. It was released on September 18, 2012, through Centricity Music. The album was produced by Peter Kipley at The Bomb Shelter in Brentwood, Tennessee. (Note: According to the inner liner notes of the album.)

The first radio single was "Better Than Life" that charted at No. 46 on the Billboard Christian Songs chart. "Resuscitate Me" was the No. 1 Billboard Christian Rock song. The album debut on the Billboard Christian and Heatseekers Albums charts at Nos. 23 and 20 respectively.

In 2013, a follow-up album was released, titled Resuscitate: The Acoustic Sessions, and it included acoustic remixes of the album's original ten songs.

== Background ==
David Zach said to Grace S. Aspinwall of CCM Magazine that "'the album, Resuscitate was really born out of a time of grieving...the thrill of being on the radio was so exciting when we started out, and getting to tour with bands that we had looked up to was so much fun. But at the same time, we missed our families so much, and it really wore us out. My brothers decided that it was time to move on to something else.'"

The album was recorded at The Bomb Shelter in Brentwood, Tennessee, in 2012. The album was produced by Peter Kipley.

== Singles ==
The first radio single was "Better Than Life". This song has attained No. 46 on the Billboard Christian Songs chart, which happed on August 19, 2012. The second single was "Resuscitate Me". The song has charted at No. 1 on the Billboard Christian Rock chart, for the week of October 13, 2012.

== Critical reception ==
Professional ratings
Review scores
| Source | Rating |
|---|---|
| CCM Magazine | 4/5 stars |
| Cross Rhythms | 7/10 squares |
| Jesus Freak Hideout | 3.5/5 stars 4/5 stars |
| New Release Tuesday | 4/5 stars 4.5/5 stars |
| Worship Leader | 5/5 stars |

CCM Magazine's Andy Argyrakis said that "Remedy Drive continues to be one of the most muscular and meaningful acts in today's modern rock world. Whether singing of their daily reliance on the Lord throughout 'Better Than Life' or offering stadium-shaking praise throughout 'Glory,' there's plenty of meat in the message."

Cross Rhythms' Matthew Griggs said that "'Resuscitate' is a great re-introduction to a band that bring to the table a varied take on a rock-worship album. The combination of anthems, honest ballads and heavier rock epics make this a refreshing listen." Griggs compared the band to the likes Switchfoot and Coldplay.

Jesus Freak Hideout's Nathaniel Schexnayder said that "musically, I've spent a bit of time here comparing Resuscitate to Daylight Is Coming. Even after the first spin, it's obvious that the debut is superior in most respects and Resuscitate qualifies perfectly for the supposed 'sophomore slump,' which is unfortunate since it took Remedy Drive four years to get here. However, albums must stand on their own, and, although it isn't quite the breath of fresh air Daylight Is Coming was, Resuscitate qualifies as a solid pop rock project with enough highlights to get by."

Jesus Freak Hideout's John DiBiase said that the album "with everything new in place except for vocalist David Zach, one might expect Remedy Drive to sound entirely different, but Resuscitate retains the heart and soul of the band through Zach's hopeful lyrics and unique vocals. However, a quick listen to the album may disappoint some fans who enjoyed the somewhat more raw sound the jam band had brought to the piano pop rock table with Daylight Is Coming (Which, honestly, I thought could have even used a little less polish then). But further listens to Resuscitate's more shiny packaging reveal the gems within." Additionally, DiBiase wrote that "as a pop rock record, Resuscitate is among some of the best of the year, while those maybe hoping to find a little more of the raw energy of their live show captured on this record might be a little disappointed. Regardless, Resuscitate remains a strong batch of songs from a band that I can expect only bigger things from in the near future as they continue to rediscover their proverbial footing as this new foursome."

New Release Tuesday's Kelly Sheads said that "despite the many changes and adjustments David Zach has had to make over the past year and a half to keep his vision for Remedy Drive alive, Resuscitate is evidence that the new foursome is on track to continue what was originally started over 10 years ago. While each new bandmate brings their own unique musicianship to the table, the familiar piano-driven melodies and hopeful lyrics that set Remedy Drive apart from their peers, remains front and center. After listening to Resuscitate, loyal and longtime fans can rest easy knowing the sound they've grown to love is still in good hands."

New Release Tuesday's Jay Wright wrote: "Remedy Drive has been together for many years, but now as a new-old band, their future is very bright. Their Resuscitate album is definitely their greatest release to date, and I see many accolades and awards in store for this band and this new album, which gets better with every listen."

Worship Leader's Amanda Furbeck felt that "it is not often that Rock 'n' Roll occupies the same space as such heavyweight Church fathers as C.S. Lewis, but Remedy Drive takes the heart of his theology and makes it live renewed in rock music. This must be their specialty, as aptly-titled Resuscitate is a glorious debut of an old band made new again. Remedy Drive is high-energy and highly driven. Resuscitate also reveals beautiful moments of purposeful clarity juxtaposed to plaintive unison cries of feeling lost, sparkling piano, cleverly spun lyrics, hard-hitting drums, and well-crafted vocal lines that come together to spread a light in the darkness of this world."

== Track listing ==
| No. | Title | Writer(s) | Length |
|---|---|---|---|
| 1. | "Better Than Life" | David Zach | 3:40 |
| 2. | "Lost Cause" | Matt Bronleewe, D. Zach & Paul Zach | 3:33 |
| 3. | "Resuscitate Me" | D. Zach | 3:45 |
| 4. | "God I Hope So" | Jason Walker & D. Zach | 4:09 |
| 5. | "What Are We Waiting For" | Seth Mosley & D. Zach | 3:27 |
| 6. | "Don't Forget" | Mosley & D. Zach | 2:50 |
| 7. | "Make It Bright" | Allen Salmon & D. Zach | 3:13 |
| 8. | "Crystal Sea" | Salmon & D. Zach | 4:57 |
| 9. | "Glory" | Peter Kipley, Mosley & D. Zach | 3:33 |
| 10. | "Hold On" | John Howard & D. Zach | 3:22 |
| 11. | "Target On Your Heart" (iTunes Bonus Track) | | 3:30 |
| Total length: | | | 36:29 |

== Charts ==
Chart performance for Resuscitate
| Chart (2012) | Peak position |
|---|---|
| US Christian Albums (Billboard) | 23 |
| US Heatseekers Albums (Billboard) | 20 |
