= Commodity (album) =

Studio album by Remedy Drive
- Released: September 23, 2014
- Genre: Contemporary Christian music, Christian alternative rock, Christian rock, indie rock
- Length: 44:03
- Label: Independent
- Producer: Philip Zach, Remedy Drive

Remedy Drive chronology
Resuscitate (2012)	Commodity (2014)	Hope's Not Giving Up (2016)

Commodity is the fifth studio album from American Christian rock band Remedy Drive. The project was funded via a Kickstarter funding campaign that enabled the band to self-release the album on September 23, 2014. Remedy Drive worked with former band member Philip Zach on production. The album cover is a photograph taken by NASA after debris created a small hole in their Solar Max Satellite in 1984. The image was made public in 2006.

In 2024, a limited-edition 10th anniversary vinyl copy of the album was released, and packaged as a set with the Scars to Prove It LP.

== Reception ==
Professional ratings
Review scores
Source	Rating
CCM Magazine	4/5 stars
HM Magazine	4/5 stars
Jesus Freak Hideout	4/5 stars 4.5/5 stars
Jesus Wired	9.5/10 stars
New Release Tuesday	4.5/5 stars
Worship Leader	4/5 stars

Signaling in a four star review by CCM Magazine, Andy Argyrakis mentions, "Not only does Remedy Drive make its strongest musical statement since its 1998 beginnings, but the lyrical thread that runs throughout Commodity is also the group's most vital." Bobby Gilles, in a four star review from Worship Leader, explaining, "Now, with the concept album Commodity, Remedy Drive is providing a soundtrack to the resistance, declaring 'the Kingdom of God is at hand.'" In agreement with the four star ratings is Sarah Dos Santos of HM Magazine, recognizing, "There are a number of innovative songwriting skills used on this album, which helps to put the band’s unique synth-rock ambiance in a league of its own instead of as a Coldplay clone." Hamilton Barber, writes a four star review for Jesus Freak Hideout, declaring, "Commodity is a good record." Specifying in a four and a half star review at New Release Tuesday, Mary Nikkel observes, "Commodity is a concept album, and should be heard as such." Jessica Morris, awarding the album a nine and a half star rating for Jesus Wired, writes, "this album is breathtaking."

== Tracks ==
No.	Title	Length
1.	"Commodity"	5:21
2.	"Dear Life"	3:39
3.	"Under the Starlight"	3:51
4.	"June [Instrumental]"	0:32
5.	"Take Cover"	3:06
6.	"The Wings of the Dawn"	5:09
7.	"The Cool of the Day"	3:26
8.	"The Sides of the North"	4:15
9.	"Throne"	3:33
10.	"Love Is Our Weapon"	2:59
11.	"King of Kings" (featuring All Sons & Daughters)	4:26
12.	"When a Soul Is Set Free"	3:52
13.	"Commodity (Radio Edit)" (Digital Bonus Track)	3:41
Total length:		44:03

== Charts ==
Chart (2014)	Peak position
US Christian Albums (Billboard)	34
