= Billboard Year-End Hot Black Singles of 1987 =

American music chart

This is a list of Billboard magazine's Top Hot Black Singles of 1987.

No.	Title	Artist(s)
1	"Stop to Love"	Luther Vandross
2	"Always"	Atlantic Starr
3	"As We Lay"	Shirley Murdock
4	"Victory"	Kool & the Gang
5	"Control"	Janet Jackson
6	"Casanova"	LeVert
7	"Love You Down"	Ready for the World
8	"Looking for a New Love"	Jody Watley
9	"Just to See Her"	Smokey Robinson
10	"Love Is a House"	Force MDs
11	"Girlfriend"	Bobby Brown
12	"I Feel Good All Over"	Stephanie Mills
13	"Have You Ever Loved Somebody"	Freddie Jackson
14	"Falling"	Melba Moore
15	"Don't Disturb This Groove"	The System
16	"Candy"	Cameo
17	"Happy"	Surface
18	"There's Nothing Better Than Love"	Luther Vandross
19	"Jimmy Lee"	Aretha Franklin
20	"Diamonds"	Herb Alpert featuring Janet Jackson
21	"Fake"	Alexander O'Neal
22	"Show Me the Way"	Regina Belle
23	"Rock Steady"	The Whispers
24	"I Wanna Dance with Somebody (Who Loves Me)"	Whitney Houston
25	"Slow Down"	Loose Ends
26	"Come Share My Love"	Miki Howard
27	"One Heartbeat"	Smokey Robinson
28	"Smooth Sailin' Tonight"	The Isley Brothers
29	"You Got It All"	The Jets
30	"(You're Puttin') A Rush on Me"	Stephanie Mills
31	"Head to Toe"	Lisa Lisa and Cult Jam
32	"Goin' to the Bank"	Commodores
33	"Jump Start"	Natalie Cole
34	"The Pleasure Principle"	Janet Jackson
35	"Sign o' the Times"	Prince
36	"We've Only Just Begun (The Romance Is Not Over)"	Glenn Jones
37	"Tasty Love"	Freddie Jackson
38	"Didn't We Almost Have It All"	Whitney Houston
39	"Lean on Me"	Club Nouveau
40	"Why You Treat Me So Bad"	Club Nouveau
41	"Caught Up in the Rapture"	Anita Baker
42	"Let's Wait Awhile"	Janet Jackson
43	"I Don't Want to Lose Your Love"	Freddie Jackson
44	"Lovin' You"	The O'Jays
45	"Lost in Emotion"	Lisa Lisa and Cult Jam
46	"Bad"	Michael Jackson
47	"I Just Can't Stop Loving You"	Michael Jackson featuring Siedah Garrett
48	"Still a Thrill"	Jody Watley
49	"Serious"	Donna Allen
50	"Back and Forth"	Cameo

== See also ==
- 1987 in music
- Billboard Year-End Hot 100 singles of 1987
- List of Hot Black Singles number ones of 1987
