= Jam Tonight =

Single by Freddie Jackson

from the album Just Like the First Time
- B-side: "Have You Ever Loved Somebody"
- Released: August 1, 1987
- Recorded: 1986
- Genre: R&B; soul
- Length: 4:34
- Label: Capitol
- Songwriters: Paul Laurence Jones; Freddie Jackson
- Producer: Paul Laurence

Freddie Jackson singles chronology
"I Don't Want to Lose Your Love" (1987)	"Jam Tonight" (1987)	"Look Around" (1987)

"Jam Tonight" is a 1987 song written by Freddie Jackson and Paul Laurence Jones, and was originally recorded by Howard Johnson under the title "Jam Song".

In 1986, Jackson recorded the song and included it on his second album, Just Like the First Time. The track was produced by Paul Laurence.

== Chart performance ==
The uptempo hit single was Jackson's final of four singles from Just Like the First Time and his sixth release to make the number one position on the Billboard Hot Black Singles chart.

"Jam Tonight" also peaked at number 32 on the Billboard Hot 100, and gave the artist the last of four Top 40 pop crossover singles (only "Rock Me Tonight (For Old Times Sake)", "You Are My Lady", and "He'll Never Love You (Like I Do)" charted higher in the Top 30).

== Track listings and formats ==
- US 7" vinyl single

A. "Jam Tonight" (Serious Edit) – 4:11
B. "Have You Ever Loved Somebody" (International Mix) – 4:59

- US 12" vinyl single

A1. "Jam Tonight" (Serious Jam Remix) – 4:59
B1. "Jam Tonight" (Serious Edit) – 4:10
B2. "Have You Ever Loved Somebody" (International Mix) – 4:59

- US 12" vinyl single promo

A "Jam Tonight" (Serious Jam Remix) – 4:58
B "Jam Tonight" (Serious Edit) – 4:11

- Canada 7" vinyl single

A1. "Jam Tonight" (Serious Jam Mix) – 4:59
B1. "Have You Ever Loved Somebody" (International Mix) – 4:57

- UK 7" vinyl single

A. "Jam Tonight" (Serious Edit) – 3:30
B. "I Don't Want to Lose Your Love" (Edit) – 3:59

- UK 12" vinyl single

A1 "Jam Tonight" (Serious Jam Remix) – 4:58
B1 "Mr. Magician" (with Mystic Merlin) – 5:15
B2 "I Don't Want to Lose Your Love" (Extended) – 4:28

"Mr. Magician" – Produced by Alan Abrahams and written by Jerry Anderson

== Personnel ==
- Executive-Producer – Beau Huggins, Wayne Edwards
- Keyboards – Paul Laurence, Eric Rehl
- Drums – Leslie Ming
- Engineer – Steve Goldman
- Producer – Paul Laurence
- Vocals – Freddie Jackson
- Writer – Paul Laurence, Freddie Jackson
- Background Vocals – Cindy Mizelle, Yolanda Lee, Audrey Wheeler
- Engineer – Joe Marno
- Rhythm and Vocal Arrangements – Paul Laurence
- Remix, Producer – Rahni Song, Zack Vaz

== Charts ==
=== Weekly charts ===
Chart (1987)	Peak position
UK Singles Chart	81
US Billboard Hot 100	32
US Hot R&B/Hip-Hop Songs (Billboard)	1

== See also ==
- R&B number-one hits of 1987 (USA)
