= Here It Is (Freddie Jackson album) =

Studio album by Freddie Jackson
- Released: January 18, 1994
- Studios: The Hit Factory, Unique Recording Studios and 111 Sound/Stage (New York City, New York); Sigma Sound Studios (Philadelphia, Pennsylvania); The Pit (Reseda, California); Record Plant (Hollywood, California); The Disc Ltd. (East Point, Michigan)
- Genres: Funk; soul
- Length: 52:28
- Label: RCA
- Producers: Lathun Grady; Paul Laurence; Charles Norris; Christian Warren; Kyle West; Maurice Wilcher

Freddie Jackson chronology
Time for Love (1992)	Here It Is (1994)	At Christmas (1994)

Singles from Here It Is
- 1. "Make Love Easy" Released: 1993; 2. "Was It Something" Released: 1994; 3. "Come Home II U" Released: 1994

Here It Is is the sixth studio album by American singer Freddie Jackson. It was released by RCA Records on January 18, 1994. His debut with the label after several years with Capitol Records, it reached number 11 on the US Top R&B/Hip-Hop Albums. Here It Is produced the singles "Come Home II U", "I Love" and "My Family".

== Critical reception ==
Professional ratings
Review scores
Source	Rating
AllMusic	3/5 stars
Billboard	(favorable)
Music Week	2/5 stars

AllMusic editor Ron Wynn found that Jackson's debut with RCA "has several excellent performances, but unfortunately, there's no single standout cut. There are brilliantly sung numbers, ('Come Home II U', 'I Love', 'My Family') but there's no track that can stand alongside 'Rock Me Tonight', 'Nice And Slow' or any of a half-dozen other past Jackson hits. Jackson merits pop attention more than many others with a much larger profile." Billboard magazine wrote, "Signed to a new label, the crooner hopes to regain the same excitement that once positioned him on the brink of R&B superstardom. Jackson remains within his vocal envelope on most tracks, performing to the level of material provided. The set's catchy first single, 'Make Love Easy', was produced by longtime collaborator Paul Laurence. 'I Love' and 'My Family', both paced by encouraging production, offer inspiring glimpses into Jackson's untapped vocal potential."

== Track listing ==
No.	Title	Writer(s)	Producer(s)	Length
1.	"Was It Something" (Duet with Shanice)	Christian Warren; Donnell Spencer	Warren	5:14
2.	"Come Home II U"	Maurice Wilcher; Sherman Byers	Wilcher	5:48
3.	"Here It Is"	Paul Laurence	Laurence	4:51
4.	"How Does It Feel"	Charles "Charva" Norris; Lathun Grady	Grady	4:36
5.	"Giving My Love to You"	Laurence	Laurence	4:48
6.	"Paradise"	Laurence	Laurence	4:50
7.	"Make Love Easy"	Laurence	Laurence	5:33
8.	"Addictive 2 Touch"	Christian Warren; Y.T. Style	Warren	5:49
9.	"I Love"	Dominique Trenier; Kyle West	West	5:13
10.	"My Family"	Charles "Charva" Norris; Lathun Grady	Grady	5:57

== Personnel and credits ==
Musicians

- Freddie Jackson – lead vocals, backing vocals (1–3, 5, 8, 9)
- Christian Warren – all instruments (1, 8), backing vocals (1, 8)
- Maurice Wilcher – all instruments (2), backing vocals (2), arrangements (2)
- Paul Laurence – music performance (3, 5–7), backing vocals (3, 5–7)
- Lathun Grady – keyboard programming (4, 10), drum programming (4, 10), backing vocals (4, 10)
- Charles "Charva" Norris – additional keyboards (4, 10), drum programming (4, 10)
- Kyle West – music performance (9)
- Antoine Foote – backing vocals (1, 8)
- Lillo Thomas – backing vocals (3)
- Audrey Wheeler – backing vocals (6, 7)

Production

- Beau Huggins – executive producer
- Skip Miller – executive producer
- Alison Ball-Gabriel – A&R direction
- Paul Biagas – A&R administration, project coordinator
- Laurie Gonzalez – project coordinator
- Anne Thomas – album coordinator
- Joel Sylvain – album coordinating assistant
- Tracey Richards – album coordinating assistant
- Ria Lewerke – art direction
- Norman Moore – design
- Timothy White – photography
- Jackie Reinhart – photo coordinator
- Pat Collins – imaging
- Bernard G. Jacobs – stylist
- Dennis Mitchell – hair stylist
- Charles Huggins for Hush Productions, Inc. – management

Technical credits

- Tony Dawsey – mastering at Masterdisk (New York, NY)
- Louis Alfred III – recording (1, 8), assistant engineer (3–7), mix assistant (4, 9, 10), recording assistant (9, 10)
- Hilary Bercovici – recording (1, 8)
- Christian Warren – recording (1, 8)
- Darkroom Productions – mixing (1, 8)
- Steve Wachman – recording (2)
- Michael Tarisa – mixing (2)
- Ron Banks – recording (3–7, 9, 10), mixing (3–7, 9, 10)
- Greg Kutcher – recording (4)
- Paul Logus – recording (9)
- Jim Michewicz – recording (10)
- Brandon Harris – mix assistant (1)
- Doug Wilson – assistant engineer (2)
- Joe Davi – assistant engineer (3, 5–7)
- Ed Miller – recording assistant (9)
- Kyle West – mix assistant (9)

== Charts ==
Chart (1994)	Peak position
US Billboard 200	66
US Top R&B/Hip-Hop Albums (Billboard)	11
