= Love Me Down =

Single by Freddie Jackson

from the album Do Me Again
- B-side: "All Over You"
- Released: 1991
- Genre: Contemporary R&B; soul
- Length: 5:20
- Label: Capitol
- Songwriters: Barry J. Eastmond; Jolyon Skinner
- Producer: Barry J. Eastmond

Freddie Jackson singles chronology
"Hey Lover" (1990)	"Love Me Down" (1991)	"Do Me Again" (1991)

"Love Me Down" is a song by American singer Freddie Jackson, released as the first single from his 1990 album, Do Me Again.
The song was written by Barry J. Eastmond and Jolyon Skinner, and produced by Eastmond. The song spent two weeks at number one on the Billboard Top R&B Songs chart in 1991.

== Track listings and formats ==
- US 12" vinyl single

A1. "Love Me Down" (Radio Edit) – 4:25
A2. "Love Me Down" (LP Version) – 5:17
B1. "Love Me Down" (Instrumental) – 5:35
B2. "All Over You" (LP Version) – 4:28

- UK CD single
1. "Love Me Down" (Radio Edit) – 4:25
2. "All Over You" – 4:28
3. "Love Me Down" (LP Version) – 5:17
- "All Over You" Produced and arrange by Michael Day and Joel Kipnis. The song appears on the 1990 film soundtrack album Def by Temptation.

== Credits ==
- Executive-Producer – Beau Huggins
- Producer, Arranger – Barry J. Eastmond
- Vocals, Lead Vocals – Freddie Jackson
- Guitars – Mike Campbell
- Bass – Anthony Jackson
- Synthesizer – Eric Rehl
- Keyboards, Drum programming – Barry Eastmond
- Writer – Barry Eastmond, Jolson Skinner
- Backing Vocals – Yolanda Lee, Nikki Richardson, Steve Abrams, Freddie Jackson
- Saxophone Solo – Najee
- Remixed, Additional Production, Engineering – Goh Hotoda

== Charts ==
Chart (1991)	Peak position
UK Singles Chart	95
US Hot R&B/Hip-Hop Songs (Billboard)	1

== See also ==
- List of number-one R&B singles of 1991 (U.S.)
