= Second Time for Love =

Single by Freddie Jackson

from the album Do Me Again
- B-side: "All Over You"
- Released: 1991
- Length: 5:18
- Label: Capitol Records 44731
- Composers: Sims; Eastmond; Spencer
- Producer: Barry J. Eastmond

Freddie Jackson singles chronology
"Main Course" (1991)	"Second Time for Love" (1991)	"I Could Use a Little Love (Right Now)" (1992)

"Second Time for Love" is a song by singer Freddie Jackson and released in 1991 as the final single from his hit album Do Me Again. It reached both the Billboard Hot R&B Singles and Cash Box Top 100 R&B Singles charts in the United States.

The song was written by Barry J. Eastmond, Donnell Spencer and Sam Sims. The record earned the composers a gold record.

== Airplay ==
The Gavin Report recorded 20 reports and 5 adds for "Second Time for Love" in the Up & Coming section of their September 13 issue. In their September 27 issue, Radio & Records reported significant action for it with medium 8/0, Light 13/4, and total adds of 4 at KPRS, WGZB, WDZZ, and WMVP. The stations for mediums included WDAS, WKYS, K97, Z16 and WALT.

In the October 4 issue, Radio & Records reported significant action for it with medium 11/0 and light 8/0. The stations for mediums included WDAS, WKYS, K97, WJIZ, and Z16. For the week ending October 5, Billboard reported that the song had moved from 26 to 18 on the playlist of WDAS in Philadelphia. The following week it was at its second week on the no. 37 spot at K97 in Memphis.

== Chart performance ==
For the week of September 28, Billboard recorded the single at no. 90 on the R&B Singles A-Z list. It made its debut on the Cash Box Top 100 R&B Singles chart at no. 81 for the week of October 5. It peaked at no. 81 on October 5 on the Billboard Hot R&B Singles chart. It peaked at no. 78 for the week of October 12, spending a total of three weeks on the Cash Box Top 100 R&B Singles chart.

== Track listings and formats ==
- US CD single
1. "Second Time for Love" – 5:16
2. "All Over You" – 4:29
- US Cassette single

A1. "Second Time for Love" – 5:16
A2. "All Over You" – 4:29
B1. "Second Time for Love" – 5:16
B2. "All Over You" – 4:29

Track "All Over You" produced by Michael Day and written by Michael Day, David Maffit, Thom Bishop

== Credits ==
- Producer, Arranger – Barry J. Eastmond
- Vocals, Background vocals – Freddie Jackson
- Alto Saxophone – Danny Willensky
- Guitar – Ira Siegel
- Synthesizer – Eric Rehl
- Executive Producer – Beau Huggins, Scott Folks
- Writer – Barry Eastmond, Sam Sims, Donnell Spencer

== Charts ==
Chart (1991)	Peak position
US Hot R&B/Hip-Hop Songs (Billboard)	81

== Publishing info ==
- Basamp, ASCAP /Night Rainbow, ASCAP /Zomba, ASCAP /Barry Eastmond, ASCAP /Honey Look, ASCAP
