= Read My Lips (Melba Moore album) =

Studio album by Melba Moore
- Released: March 22, 1985
- Studio: Unique, New York City
- Length: 40:58
- Label: Capitol
- Producer: Richard James Burgess; Keith Diamond; Paul Laurence

Melba Moore chronology
Never Say Never (1983)	Read My Lips (1985)	A Lot of Love (1986)

Read My Lips is the fourteenth album by American singer Melba Moore. It was released by Capitol Records on March 22, 1985. This album featured the hit title track and "When You Love Me Like This". The title track garnered Moore a third Grammy Award nomination for Best Female Rock Vocal Performance, making her just the fourth black artist after Donna Summer, Joan Armatrading, and Tina Turner to be nominated in the category.

== Critical reception ==
Professional ratings
Review scores
Source	Rating
AllMusic	4.5/5 stars

AllMusic editor Justin Kantor awarded the album four and a half stars out of five and called it "the most versatile and underrated item in Moore's often overlooked catalog." He found that "with arrangements that are always on the dot, solid songs, and stellar vocals, Read My Lips is a must for every Moore fan's collection."

== Track listing ==
Side one
No.	Title	Writer(s)	Producer(s)	Length
1.	"Love of a Lifetime"	Keith Diamond; Craig Peyton; Jolyon Skinner	Diamond	5:39
2.	"I Can't Believe It's Over"	Diamond; Lew Kirton	Diamond	5:30
3.	"Read My Lips"	Madeline Stone; Sam Lorber	Diamond	4:07
4.	"Dreams"	Stevie Nicks	Diamond	4:55

Side two
No.	Title	Writer(s)	Producer(s)	Length
5.	"When You Love Me Like This (duet with Lillo Thomas)"	Diamond	Diamond	4:24
6.	"Winner"	Freddie Jackson; Paul Laurence	Laurence	4:14
7.	"King of My Heart"	Diamond	Diamond	3:57
8.	"To Those Who Wait"	Barry Eastmond; Diamond	Diamond	4:28
9.	"Mind Over Matter"	Jay Levy; Terry Shaddick	Richard James Burgess	3:44

== Charts ==
Chart (1985)	Peak position
US Billboard 200	130
US Top R&B/Hip-Hop Albums (Billboard)	24
