= Time for Love (Freddie Jackson album) =

Studio album by Freddie Jackson
- Released: August 3, 1992
- Studios: East Bay Studios (Tarrytown, New York); Soundtrack Studios, The Hit Factory, D&D Studios, Black Shades Recording and Soundworks (New York City, New York); The Sandbox Studios (Easton, Connecticut); Capitol Studios and Elumba Studios (Hollywood, California)
- Genres: Funk; Soul; Hip-hop
- Length: 54:23
- Label: Capitol
- Producers: Barry J. Eastmond; Kiyamma Griffin; Kenni Hairston; Vincent Herbert; Gene Lennon; Arif Mardin; Richard Marx; Joshua Thompson

Freddie Jackson chronology
Do Me Again (1990)	Time for Love (1992)	Here It Is (1994)

Singles from Time for Love
- 1. "I Could Use a Little Love (Right Now)" Released: June 1992; 2. "Can I Touch You" Released: August 1992; 3. "Me and Mrs. Jones" Released: November 1992

Time for Love is the fifth studio album by American singer Freddie Jackson. It was released by Capitol Records on August 3, 1992, in the United States. The album includes the singles "Me and Mrs. Jones", "Can We Try" and the album's opener "I Could Use a Little Love Right Now". Time for Love by Jackson served as his last album with the label.

== Critical reception ==
Professional ratings
Review scores
Source	Rating
AllMusic	3/5 stars

AllMusic editor Alex Henderson called Time for Love "a satisfying effort that isn't much different from his previous Capitol releases. The New Yorker obviously knew what his strengths were – smooth soul/urban contemporary music and romantic ballads – and once again, the singer succeeds by zeroing in on them [..] Though it falls short of the excellence of Rock Me Tonight and Just Like the First Time, this CD was a welcome addition to his catalog."

== Track listing ==
No.	Title	Writer(s)	Producer(s)	Length
1.	"I Could Use a Little Love (Right Now)"	Barry J. Eastmond; Jolyon Skinner	Eastmond	5:30
2.	"Time for Love Tonight"	Eastmond; Skinner	Eastmond	5:03
3.	"Chivalry"	Gene Lennon; Joshua Thompson	Lennon	4:32
4.	"Trouble"	Lennon; Thompson	Lennon; Kenni Hairston	5:01
5.	"Can I Touch You"	Kiyamma Griffin; Vincent Herbert	Griffin; Herbert	4:19
6.	"All I'll Ever Ask"	Joshua Kadison	Arif Mardin	4:44
7.	"Will You Be There"	Eastmond; Skinner	Eastmond	5:27
8.	"Come with Me Tonight"	Eastmond; Skinner	Eastmond	4:41
9.	"Can We Try"	Eastmond; Skinner	Eastmond	4:56
10.	"Me and Mrs. Jones"	Cary Gilbert; Kenny Gamble; Leon Huff	Hairston	5:25
11.	"Live My Life Without You"	Kathy Wakefield; Richard Marx	Marx	4:51

== Personnel and credits ==
Musicians

- Freddie Jackson – lead vocals, backing vocals (1–3, 5–10)
- Barry J. Eastmond – keyboards (1, 2, 7, 8), bass (1), drum programming (1, 2, 8), acoustic piano (9)
- Eric Rehl – synthesizer programming (1, 2, 8), keyboards (7), drum programming ( 7), Rhodes electric piano (9), synthesizers (9)
- Gene Lennon – keyboards (3, 4), programming (3, 4), drum programming (3), drums (4)
- Joshua Paul Thompson – keyboards (3, 4), programming (3, 4), drum programming (3), drums (4)
- Gary Henry – additional keyboards (3, 4)
- Kenni Hairston – keyboards (4, 10), programming (4, 10), drums (4)
- Tony Prendatt – programming (4)
- Alan Gerber – additional keyboards (4)
- Kiyamma Griffin – keyboards (5), drums (5)
- Ike Lee III – additional programming (5)
- Steve Skinner – keyboards (6), programming (6)
- Joey Moskowitz – programming (10)
- Jamey Jaz – keyboards (11), programming (11)
- Mike "Dino" Campbell – guitars (1)
- Ira Siegel – guitars (2), guitar solo (2)
- Paul Pesco – guitars (6)
- Georg Wadenius – guitars (9)
- Bruce Gaitsch – guitars (11)
- Anthony Jackson – electric bass (3, 4), bass (9)
- Tinker Barfield – bass (7)
- Leland Sklar – bass (11)
- Goh Hotoda – additional drum programming (3)
- Omar Hakim – hi-hat (6), drums (9)
- Bashiri Johnson – percussion (9)
- Najee – soprano saxophone (6), lead vocals (6)
- Danny Wilensky – tenor saxophone (9)
- Vincent Henry – saxophone (10)
- Andre Ward – saxophone (10)
- Yolanda Lee – backing vocals (1–4, 7, 8, 10)
- Audrey Wheeler – backing vocals (2–4, 7)
- Derrick Culler – backing vocals (3)
- Hunter Hayes – backing vocals (3)
- Cash Ellington – rap (3)
- Forty Thieves – rap (3)
- Janice Dempsey – backing vocals (5)
- Russell Patterson – backing vocals (5)
- Jerry Barnes – backing vocals (6)
- Katreese Barnes – backing vocals (6)
- Rachele Cappelli – backing vocals (6)
- Reggie Griffin – backing vocals (6)
- Antoinette Thomas – backing vocals (8)
- Will Downing – backing vocals (9)
- James D-Train Williams – backing vocals (9)
- D'Atra Hicks – lead vocals (11)

Music arrangements

- Barry J. Eastmond – arrangements (1, 2, 7–9), string arrangements (9)
- Freddie Jackson – vocal arrangements (5)
- Arif Mardin – arrangements (6)
- Steve Skinner – arrangements (6)
- Eric Rehl – arrangements (7)
- Kenni Hairston – arrangements (10)
- Jamey Jaz – arrangements (11)
- Richard Marx – arrangements (11)

=== Production ===
- Scott Folks – executive producer
- Beau Huggins – executive producer
- Goh Hotoda – additional production (3)
- Anne Thomas – chief administrator
- Paul Biagas – production administrator, production coordinator
- Lisa Maldonado – production coordinator (6)
- Susanne Marie Edgren – production coordinator (11)
- Jackie Rhinehart – concept direction
- Tommy Steele – art direction
- DZN, The Design Group – design
- Joe Grant – photography
- Bernard G. Jacobs – fashion stylist
- Sylva Green – personal appearance

Technical credits

- Greg Calbi – mastering at Sterling Sound (New York, NY)
- Earl Cohen – recording (1–4, 7–9), mixing (9)
- Goh Hotoda – mixing (1, 2, 7, 8, 10), recording (3), remixing (3)
- Phil Castellano – recording (3–5)
- Tony Prendatt – recording (3–5)
- Michael Fossenkemper – mixing (3), recording (10)
- Gene Lennon – recording (4)
- Ben Garrison – mixing (5)
- Michael O'Reilly – recording (6), mixing (6)
- Darroll Gustamachio – recording (9)
- Kieran Walsh – recording (10)
- Craig Williams – recording (10)
- Bill Drescher – recording (11), mixing (11)
- Jim Viviano – assistant engineer (1, 8, 9)
- Jonathan Bibesheimer – assistant engineer (2, 7, 9)
- Todd Childress – assistant engineer (2, 8, 9)
- Marc Goodman – assistant engineer (5)
- Rich July – assistant engineer (6)
- Armen Mazlumien – assistant engineer (7, 9)
- Charlie Paakkari – additional engineer (11)
- Ray Silva – additional engineer (11)

== Charts ==
=== Weekly charts ===
Chart (1992)	Peak position
US Billboard 200	83
US Top R&B/Hip-Hop Albums (Billboard)	7

=== Year-end charts ===
Chart (1992)	Position
US Top R&B/Hip-Hop Albums (Billboard)	60
