= Do Me Again (album) =

Studio album by Freddie Jackson
- Released: October 29, 1990
- Studios: East Bay Studios (Tarrytown, New York); Soundtrack Studios, Broad Bread Recording and RPM Studios (New York City, New York); Hill Studios (Palisades Park, New Jersey)
- Genres: Funk; Soul
- Length: 55:21
- Label: Capitol
- Producers: Barry J. Eastmond; Paul Laurence; Daniel Telefaro; Michael Day; Joel Kipnis

Freddie Jackson chronology
Don't Let Love Slip Away (1988)	Do Me Again (1990)	Time For Love (1992)

Professional ratings
Review scores
Source	Rating
AllMusic	3/5 stars
Chicago Tribune	3/4 stars
The Encyclopedia of Popular Music	3/5 stars
The Rolling Stone Album Guide	3/5 stars

Do Me Again is the fourth studio album by American singer Freddie Jackson, released by Capitol Records in 1990. The album became Jackson's fourth consecutive effort to top the Billboard Top R&B Albums chart, and went gold in the US.

== Critical reception ==
The Boston Globe wrote that "once again, Freddie Jackson gently massages our earlobes with several highly suggestive ditties that would make Barry White blush." Ebony deemed the album "steamy" and "a musical feast." The Baltimore Sun wrote that "where [Luther] Vandross likes to power through his love songs, Jackson invariably takes a lighter touch, and that's what makes his Do Me Again worth replaying." The Rolling Stone Album Guide called Do Me Again Jackson's best album since his debut, giving much of the credit to the return of mentor Paul Laurence.

NME said, "Singer of saccharine soul ballads makes another album. Lovely bloke, lovely voice, utterly bland package."

== Track listing ==
Do Me Again track listing
No.	Title	Writer(s)	Producer(s)	Length
1.	"Don't It Feel Good"	Barry J. Eastmond; Jolyon Skinner; Freddie Jackson	Eastmond	5:08
2.	"Love Me Down"	Eastmond; Skinner	Eastmond	5:22
3.	"Main Course"	Paul Laurence	Laurence	4:55
4.	"It Takes Two"	Daniel Telefaro; James McKinney; Linda Vitali	Telefaro	5:34
5.	"I'll Be Waiting for You"	Eastmond; Skinner	Eastmond	4:48
6.	"Don't Say You Love Me"	McKinney; Janice Dempsey	Laurence	5:09
7.	"Do Me Again"	Paul Laurence; Lou Humphries; Darryl Dash	Laurence	5:10
8.	"Live for the Moment"	Eastmond; Skinner	Eastmond	4:52
9.	"Second Time for Love"	Eastmond; Donnell Spencer; Sam Sims	Eastmond	5:18
10.	"I Can't Take It"	Tyrone Holmes	Laurence	4:29
11.	"All Over You"	Michael Day; Rocky Maffit; Thom Bishop	Day	4:29

== Personnel and credits ==
Musicians

- Freddie Jackson – lead vocals, backing vocals
- Barry J. Eastmond – keyboards (1, 2, 5, 8, 9), drum programming (1, 2, 5, 8, 9)
- Eric Rehl – synthesizers (1, 2, 5, 8, 9)
- Paul Laurence – keyboards (3, 7, 10), programming (3, 7, 10), additional programming (6), backing vocals (7)
- James McKinney – keyboards (4, 6), programming (4, 6)
- Darryl Shepherd – keyboards (4), programming (4)
- DLA – keyboards (7), programming (7)
- Tyrone Holmes – keyboards (10), programming (10), backing vocals (10)
- Michael Day – keyboards (11), backing vocals (11)
- Billy "Spaceman" Patterson – guitars (1)
- Mike "Dino" Campbell – guitars (2, 4, 8)
- Rohn Lawrence – guitars (5)
- Ira Siegel – guitars (9)
- Joel Kipnis – guitars (11), guitar synthesizer (11), drum and percussion programming (11)
- Anthony Jackson – bass (2)
- Najee – saxophone solo (2)
- Danny Wilensky – alto saxophone (9)
- Yolanda Lee – backing vocals (1–3, 5–8)
- Nikki Richards – backing vocals (1, 2, 5, 8)
- Steve Abram – backing vocals (2, 5)
- Audrey Wheeler – backing vocals (3)
- Janice Dempsey – backing vocals (4)
- Clifford Jameson – backing vocals (6)
- Maria Liuzzo – backing vocals (7)
- Lillo Thomas – backing vocals (7)
- Jenny Peters – backing vocals (10)
- Rocky Maffit – backing vocals (11)

Music arrangements

- Barry J. Eastmond – arrangements (1, 2, 5, 8, 9)
- Paul Laurence – arrangements (3, 7, 10)
- James McKinney – arrangements (6)
- Michael Day – arrangements (11)
- Joel Kipnis – arrangements (11)
- Rocky Maffit – arrangements (11)

=== Production ===
- Beau Huggins – executive producer
- Goh Hotoda – additional production (1–4, 6, 7, 10)
- Linda Vitali – co-producer (4)
- Anne Thomas – chief administrator
- Paul Biagas – production administrator
- Weldon Cochren – production coordinator
- Lynda Simmons – project coordinator
- Tommy Steele – art direction
- DZN, The Design Group – design
- Adrian Buckmaster – photography
- Alfonso Grundy – grooming
- Alexander White – fashion stylist
- Freddie Jackson – sleeve notes
- Hush Productions, Inc. – management

Technical credits

- Jack Skinner – mastering at Sterling Sound (New York, NY)
- Goh Hotoda – engineer (1–4, 6, 7, 10), remixing (1–4, 6, 7, 10)
- Earl Cohen – recording (1, 2, 5, 8, 9), mixing (1, 2, 5, 8, 9)
- Ron Banks – recording (3, 6, 7, 10), mixing (3, 6, 7, 10)
- Steve Goldman – recording (3, 4, 6, 7, 10), mixing (3, 10)
- Ed Douglas – recording (4)
- Mike Groke – recording (4)
- Peter Rincon – recording (4)
- Joel Kipnis – recording (11), mixing (11)
- Dave Lebowitz – assistant engineer (1, 2, 5, 8, 9), recording (4)
- Chris Trevett – assistant engineer (1, 2, 5, 8, 9), recording (4)
- Chris Butler – assistant engineer (4)
- Scott Canto – assistant engineer (4)

== Charts ==
=== Weekly charts ===
Chart (1990)	Peak position
UK Albums (Official Charts)	48
US Billboard 200	59
US Top R&B/Hip-Hop Albums (Billboard)	1

=== Year-end charts ===
Chart (1991)	Position
US Top R&B/Hip-Hop Albums (Billboard)	2

== Certifications ==
Region	Certification	Certified units/sales
United States (RIAA)	Gold	500,000^{^}
^{^} Shipments figures based on certification alone.
