= List of Hot Black Singles number ones of 1987 =

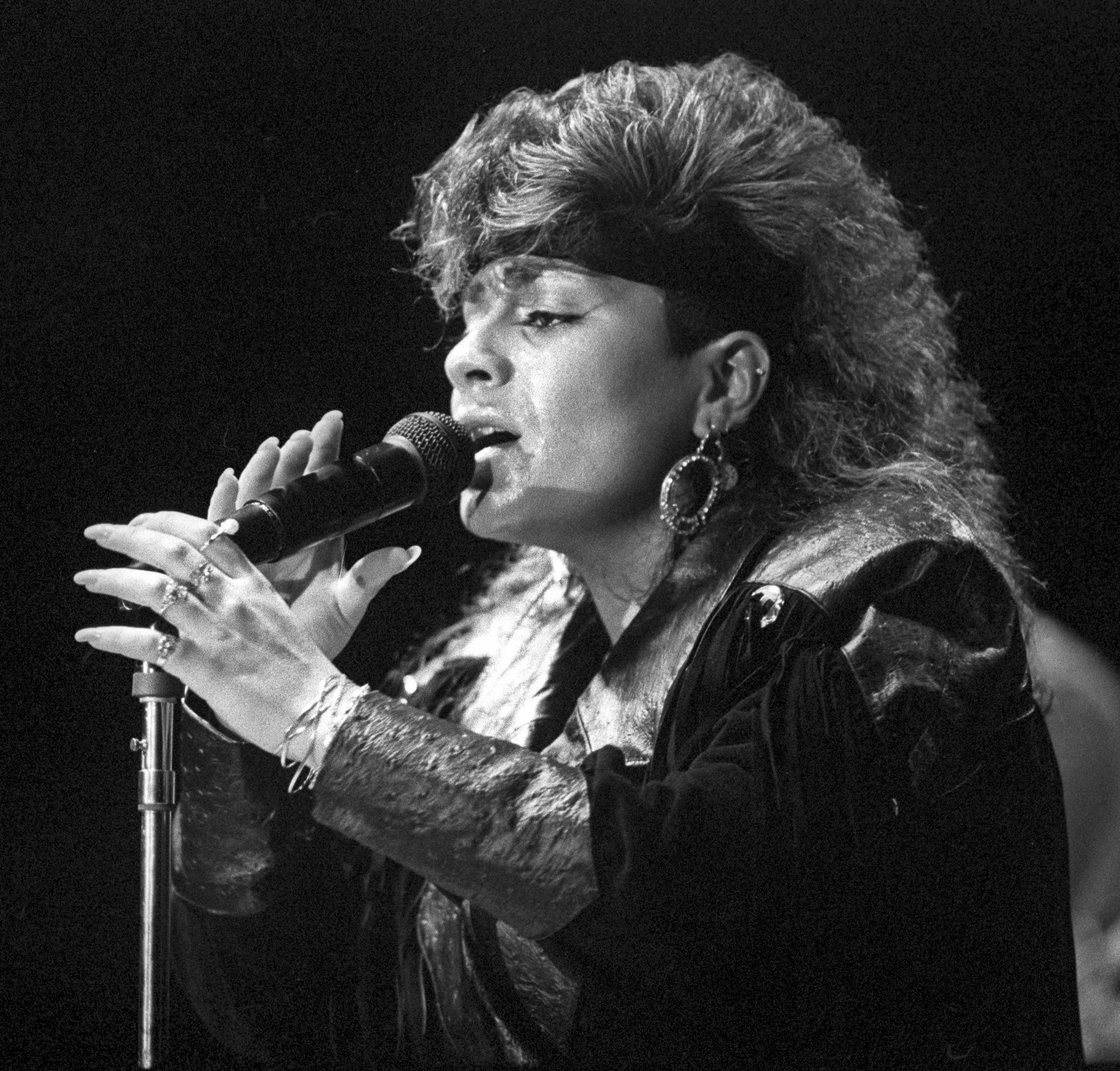
Lisa Lisa (pictured in 1987) gained her first number one, along with Cult Jam, with "Head to Toe".

Billboard published a weekly chart in 1987 ranking the top-performing singles in the United States in African American-oriented genres; the chart has undergone various name changes over the decades to reflect the evolution of black music and has been published as Hot R&B/Hip-Hop Songs since 2005. In 1987, it was published under the title Hot Black Singles, and 33 different singles reached number one.

In the issue of Billboard dated January 3, Bobby Brown's track "Girlfriend" was at number one, retaining its position from the previous week. The following week, it was replaced by "Control", the first of four number ones in 1987 for Janet Jackson, who also took "Let's Wait Awhile", and "The Pleasure Principle" to the peak position and provided featured vocals on "Diamonds" by trumpeter Herb Alpert. Her brother Michael achieved three number ones during the year, topping the listing with "I Just Can't Stop Loving You", which also featured Siedah Garrett, as well as "Bad" and "The Way You Make Me Feel". Freddie Jackson (no relation to Janet and Michael), Luther Vandross, Lisa Lisa and Cult Jam, and Stephanie Mills all had two chart-toppers in 1987. Michael and Janet Jackson each achieved a total of five weeks at number one, the most by any artist. Michael's song "Bad" was one of four singles to spend three consecutive weeks in the top spot, tying with singles by Jody Watley, Prince, and Stephanie Mills for the year's longest run atop the chart.

A number of acts achieved their first number-one singles on the chart in 1987, including Alpert, Garrett, the System, Gregory Hines, Atlantic Starr, Lisa Lisa and Cult Jam, Alexander O'Neal, the Force M.D.'s, and LL Cool J. Although Alpert had experienced little success to date on the black singles listing, he had placed nearly 40 songs on Billboard's pop chart, the Hot 100, beginning in 1962, several years before teenaged 1987 chart-toppers Brown and LL Cool J were even born. Angela Winbush topped the Hot Black Singles chart for the first time as a solo artist, having previously reached number one as half of the duo René & Angela, and Watley gained her first solo chart-topper, having previously reached the peak position as a member of the group Shalamar. The O'Jays returned to number one after a nine-year absence with their single "Lovin' You". Five of 1987's Hot Black Singles number ones also topped the Hot 100: Michael Jackson's "I Just Can't Stop Loving You" and "Bad" as well as "Always" by Atlantic Starr, and both "Head to Toe" and "Lost in Emotion" by Lisa Lisa and Cult Jam.

== Chart history ==
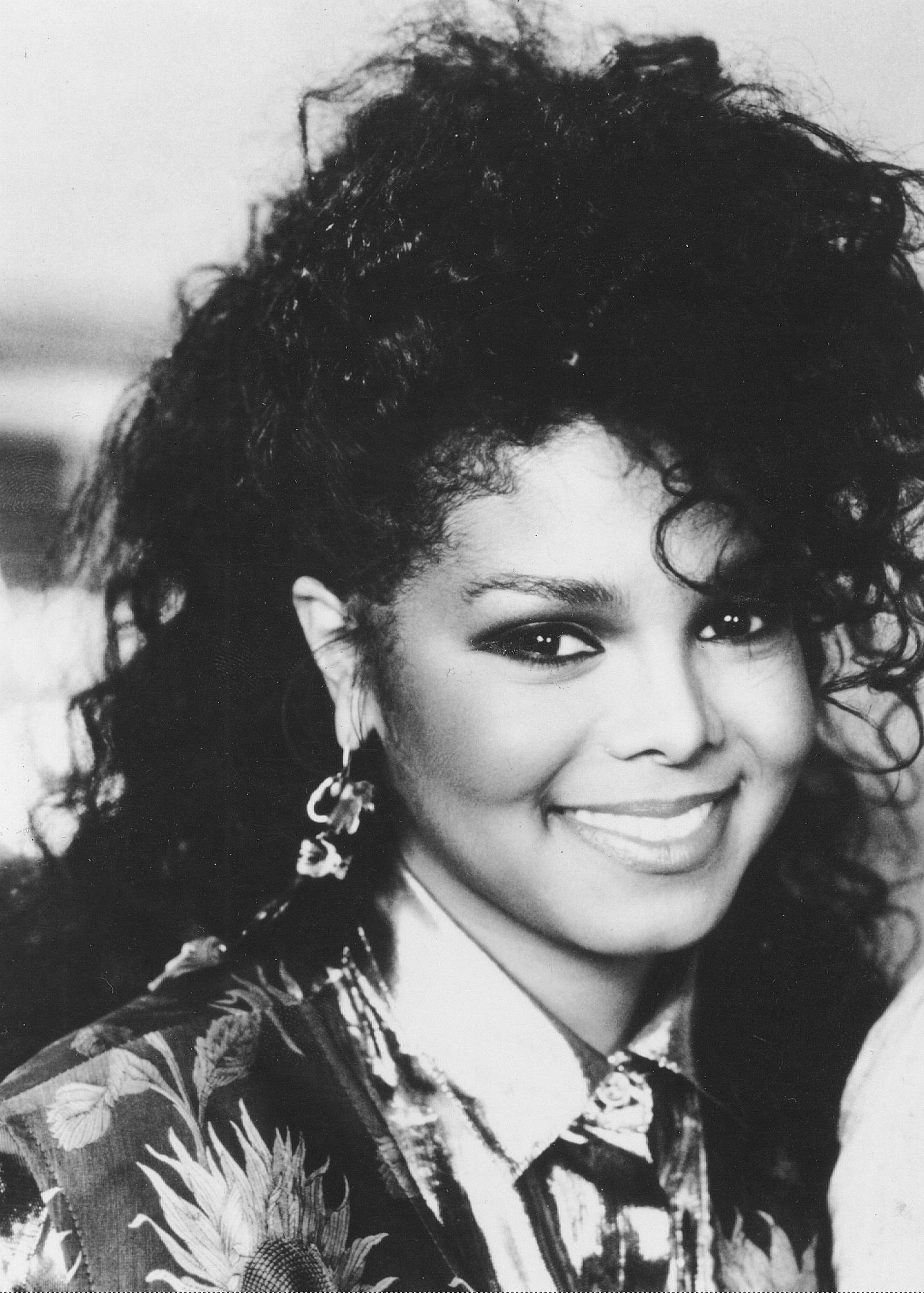
Janet Jackson (pictured in 1986) had four number-ones during 1987: "Control", "Let's Wait Awhile", "Diamonds" (with Herb Alpert), and "The Pleasure Principle".

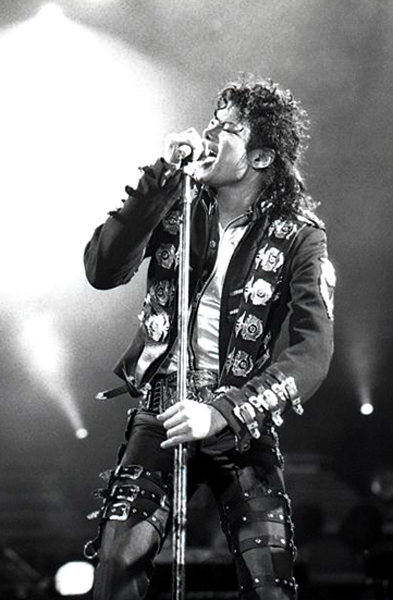
Michael Jackson (pictured in 1988) had three chart toppers during the year: "I Just Can't Stop Loving You", "Bad", and "The Way You Make Me Feel".

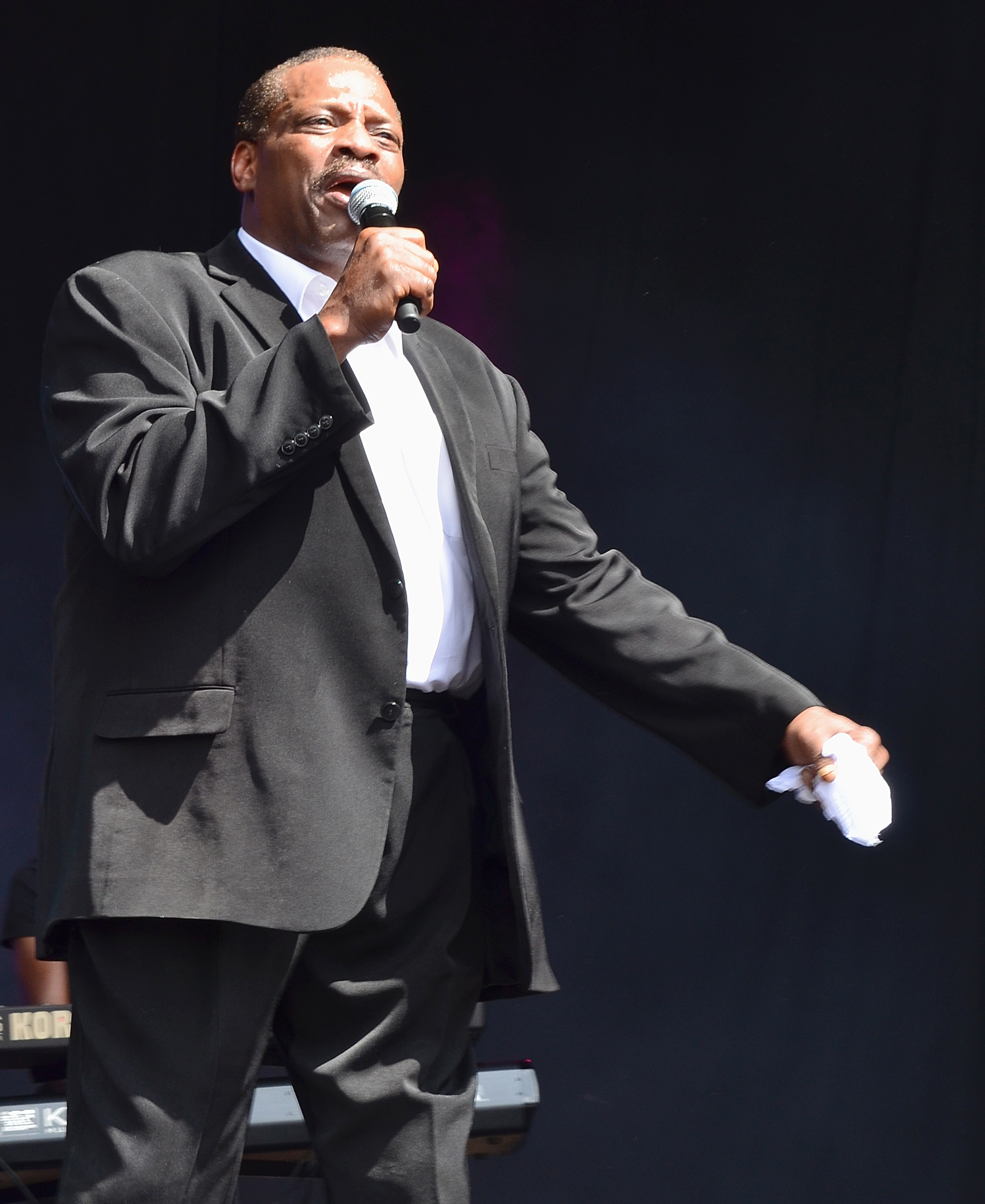
"Fake" was a chart-topper for Alexander O'Neal (pictured in 2014).

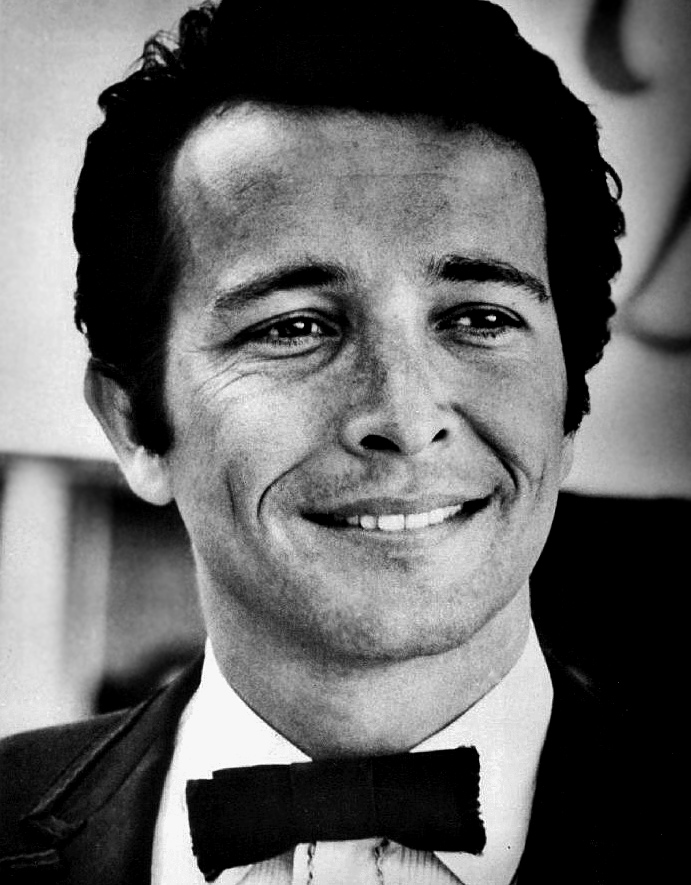
Herb Alpert (pictured in 1966) had his first Hot Black Singles number one, 25 years after his first pop chart entry.

Key
†	Indicates number 1 on Billboard's year-end black singles chart

Chart history
Issue date	Title	Artist(s)	Ref.
January 3	"Girlfriend"	Bobby Brown	
January 10	"Control"	Janet Jackson	
January 17	"Stop to Love" †	Luther Vandross	
January 24	"Stop to Love" †	Luther Vandross	
January 31	"Candy"	Cameo	
February 7	"Candy"	Cameo	
February 14	"Falling"	Melba Moore	
February 21	"Have You Ever Loved Somebody"	Freddie Jackson	
February 28	"Have You Ever Loved Somebody"	Freddie Jackson	
March 7	"Slow Down"	Loose Ends	
March 14	"Let's Wait Awhile"	Janet Jackson	
March 21	"Looking for a New Love"	Jody Watley	
March 28	"Looking for a New Love"	Jody Watley	
April 4	"Looking for a New Love"	Jody Watley	
April 11	"Sign 'O' the Times"	Prince	
April 18	"Sign 'O' the Times"	Prince	
April 25	"Sign 'O' the Times"	Prince	
May 2	"Don't Disturb This Groove"	The System	
May 9	"There's Nothing Better Than Love"	Luther Vandross with Gregory Hines	
May 16	"Always"	Atlantic Starr	
May 23	"Always"	Atlantic Starr	
May 30	"Head to Toe"	Lisa Lisa and Cult Jam	
June 6	"Head to Toe"	Lisa Lisa and Cult Jam	
June 13	"Rock Steady"	The Whispers	
June 20	"Diamonds"	Herb Alpert featuring Janet Jackson	
June 27	"Diamonds"	Herb Alpert featuring Janet Jackson	
July 4	"I Feel Good All Over"	Stephanie Mills	
July 11	"I Feel Good All Over"	Stephanie Mills	
July 18	"I Feel Good All Over"	Stephanie Mills	
July 25	"Fake"	Alexander O'Neal	
August 1	"Fake"	Alexander O'Neal	
August 8	"The Pleasure Principle"	Janet Jackson	
August 15	"Jam Tonight"	Freddie Jackson	
August 22	"Casanova"	LeVert	
August 29	"Casanova"	LeVert	
September 5	"Love is a House"	The Force M.D.s	
September 12	"Love is a House"	The Force M.D.s	
September 19	"I Just Can't Stop Loving You"	Michael Jackson with Siedah Garrett	
September 26	"I Need Love"	LL Cool J	
October 3	"Lost in Emotion"	Lisa Lisa and Cult Jam	
October 10	"(You're Puttin') A Rush on Me"	Stephanie Mills	
October 17	"Bad"	Michael Jackson	
October 24	"Bad"	Michael Jackson	
October 31	"Bad"	Michael Jackson	
November 7	"Lovin' You"	The O'Jays	
November 14	"Angel"	Angela Winbush	
November 21	"Angel"	Angela Winbush	
November 28	"Skeletons"	Stevie Wonder	
December 5	"Skeletons"	Stevie Wonder	
December 12	"System of Survival"	Earth, Wind & Fire	
December 19	"I Want to Be Your Man"	Roger	
December 26	"The Way You Make Me Feel"	Michael Jackson	

== See also ==
- Billboard Year-End Hot Black Singles of 1987
- List of Billboard Hot 100 number ones of 1987
