= Vaneese Thomas =

American R&B, jazz and soul blues singer

- Born: Vaneese Yseult Thomas; August 24, 1952 (age 73); Memphis, Tennessee, United States
- Genres: R&B; jazz; soul blues
- Occupation(s): Singer, songwriter, record producer
- Instrument: Vocals
- Years active: 1985–present
- Labels: Geffen; Peaceful Waters Music; Unleashthe80's; Segue

Vaneese Yseult Thomas (born August 24, 1952) is an American R&B, jazz and soul blues singer, best known for her 1987 US Billboard R&B chart hit single, "Let's Talk It Over". In addition, in more recent times, she has supplied backing vocals on a long list of other musicians' work. Thomas has appeared at the Montreux Jazz Festival, and at the 2006 Pleasantville Music Festival. At the 36th Blues Music Awards, she was nominated in two categories; firstly for the 'Soul Blues Album' award for her 2013 album, Blues for My Father, and also as the 'Soul Blues Female Artist'.

== Life and career ==
Born in Memphis, Tennessee, United States, she is the youngest child of Rufus Thomas; her brother Marvell and sister Carla are also musicians. Vaneese Thomas enjoyed some success in the late 1980s, with her solo releases being made on the Geffen Records label. Her self-titled debut album spawned a couple of top 20 US R&B hit singles in "Let's Talk It Over", which featured a saxophone solo by Najee, and "(I Wanna Get) Close To You" in 1987. Follow up releases did not sustain her earlier success levels, but she switched to working as mainly a backing vocalist appearing on many recordings made by other musicians. Her session duties included working alongside Lenny White, Bob James, Carl Anderson, Freddie Jackson, Beau Williams, Melba Moore, Joe Cocker, Sarah Dash, Luciano Pavarotti, Sting, Stevie Wonder, Michael Jackson, Celine Dion, Eric Clapton, Carly Simon, and Dr. John.

On November 15, 1998, she released her second album When My Back's Against the Wall. Billboard described the album as "a small label masterpiece that begs for attention from savvy majors".

In addition to her concerts and numerous recordings, Thomas has worked in both film and television. She provided the singing voice of Grace the Bass on the PBS children's television series, Shining Time Station, and of Clio the Muse in the Disney film, Hercules. Thomas has also sung backing vocals in the film soundtracks including Anastasia (1997), Mighty Aphrodite and The First Wives Club. On television, Thomas has made appearances on Late Show with David Letterman, Late Night with Conan O'Brien, and the NBC show Today.

Her work has included record producing, supervising vocal arrangements and song writing duties. Her material has been recorded by Patti Austin ("A Candle", "Rain Rain Rain"), Freddie Jackson (Just Like the First Time), Bob James ("Gone Hollywood"), Larry Coryell ("This Love of Ours"), and Melba Moore (A Lot of Love). Diana Ross had a top 10 UK hit single with the Thomas penned "One Shining Moment". Her production credits include Patti Austin's Street of Dreams (1999), Sarah Dash's Your All I Need (1988), and Freddie Jackson's, Just Like the First Time (1986).

Thomas helped in the foundation of the Swarthmore College Gospel Choir, where she was formerly a pupil.

In 2008, Thomas and James D-Train Williams won the Odyssey Award as joint narrators of Walter Dean Myers' audiobook, Jazz.

Her most recent release was Blues for My Father (2013), for which Thomas wrote most of the material. The tracks include a 'duet' with her late father, and another with her sister, Carla Thomas, on the song "Wrong Turn".

== Personal life ==
Thomas lives in Westchester County, New York, with her husband and fellow songwriter and producer, Wayne Warnecke. She once taught in a school in France when she resided in that country for a time and, more recently, taught at the City College of New York.

== Discography ==
=== Albums ===
Year	Title	Record label	US R&B
1987	Vaneese Thomas	Geffen Records	45
1998	When My Back's Against the Wall	Peaceful Waters Music	—
2001	Talk Me Down	Unleashthe80's	—
2003	A Woman's Love	Segue Records	—
2009	Soul Sister, Vol. 1: A Tribute to the Women of Soul	Segue Records	—
2013	Blues for My Father	Segue Records	—
"—" denotes releases that did not chart.

=== Chart singles ===
Year	Title	Record label	US R&B
1987	"Let's Talk It Over"	Geffen Records	10
1987	"(I Wanna Get) Close to You"	Geffen Records	12
1988	"Heading in the Right Direction"	Geffen Records	76
