= A Lot of Love =

Studio album by Melba Moore
- Released: July 18, 1986
- Length: 43:35
- Label: Capitol
- Producer: Chad; Paul Gurvitz; Rahni Harris; Kashif; Howard King; Paul Laurence; Gene McFadden; Brian Morgan; Ernie Poccia; Shelly Scruggs; Vaneese Thomas; Wayne Warnecke

Melba Moore chronology
Read My Lips (1985)	A Lot of Love (1986)	I'm in Love (1988)

A Lot of Love is the fifteenth album by American singer Melba Moore. It was released by Capitol Records on July 18, 1986. This album featured two number-one R&B hits, including the duet, "A Little Bit More", with Freddie Jackson and "Falling". She scored other popular R&B hits including "Love the One I'm With (A Lot of Love)" and "It's Been So Long".

== Reception ==
The Allmusic review by Bil Carpenter awarded the album 4.5 stars stating "Warm soul duets with Freddie Jackson and Kashif."

Professional ratings
Review scores
Source	Rating
Allmusic	4.5/5 stars

== Track listing ==
Side one
No.	Title	Writer(s)	Producer(s)	Length
1.	"There I Go Falling in Love Again"	Paul Laurence	Laurence	3:32
2.	"It's Been So Long" (introducing Dennis Collins)	Howard King	King; Kevin "Chad" Robinson	4:57
3.	"I'm Not Gonna Let You Go"	Ondrea Dawkins; Laurence	Laurence	4:06
4.	"Love the One I'm With (A Lot of Love)" (with Kashif)	Kashif; Paul Gurvitz	Kashif; Gurvitz	4:11
5.	"You Trip Me Out"	Kashif; Brian Morgan; Shelly Scruggs	Kashif; Morgan; Scruggs	4:35

Side two
No.	Title	Writer(s)	Producer(s)	Length
6.	"A Little Bit More" (duet with Freddie Jackson)	Gene McFadden; James McKinley; Linda Vitali	McFadden	5:06
7.	"Falling"	Frannie Golde; McFadden	McFadden	4:44
8.	"Stay"	Vaneese Thomas	Thomas; Ernie Poccia; Wayne Warnecke	4:28
9.	"When We Touch (It's Like Fire)"	Poccia; Thomas	Thomas; Poccia; Warnecke	4:24
10.	"Don't Go Away"	Rahni Harris; Zachary Harris	R. Harris	3:43

== Personnel ==
- Ron Banks – engineer
- Beau Huggins – producer
- Melba Moore – vocals

== Charts ==
Chart (1986)	Peak position
US Billboard 200	91
US Top R&B/Hip-Hop Albums (Billboard)	7
