= Just Like the First Time =

Just Like The First Time

Studio album by Freddie Jackson
- Released: November 6, 1986
- Recorded: November 1985 – April 1986
- Studios: Digital By Dickinson (Bloomfield, New Jersey); Unique Recording Studios, Quadrasonic Studios, Electric Lady Studios, 39th Street Music Studio, Celestial Sound Studios and The Hit Factory (New York City, New York); Minot Sound (White Plains, New York)
- Genres: R&B; soul
- Length: 47:19
- Label: Capitol
- Producers: Chad; Paul Laurence; Vaneese Thomas; Barry Eastmond; Garry Glenn; Howard King; Gene McFadden; Wayne Warnecke; Ernie Poccia

Freddie Jackson chronology
Rock Me Tonight (1985)	Just Like The First Time (1986)	Don't Let Love Slip Away (1988)

Singles from Just Like the First Time
- 1. "Tasty Love" Released: October 28, 1986; 2. "Have You Ever Loved Somebody" Released: December 20, 1986; 3. "I Don't Want To Lose Your Love" Released: February 2, 1987; 4. "Jam Tonight" Released: August 1, 1987; 5. "Look Around" Released: October 14, 1987

Professional ratings
Review scores
Source	Rating
AllMusic	3.5/5 stars

Just Like the First Time is the second studio album by American R&B/Soul singer Freddie Jackson. Released in November 1986, the album had one of the longest record runs at number one on the U.S. R&B Albums chart, as it spent 26 weeks at the top of that chart. (This longevity gave the album the highest charting position on the Billboard Year-End chart as an R&B Album in 1987.) It also peaked at number 23 on the Billboard 200. It was certified platinum by the RIAA on January 20, 1987. The album yielded three number-one singles on the R&B singles chart with "Have You Ever Loved Somebody", "Tasty Love" and "Jam Tonight". A fourth single, "I Don't Want to Lose Your Love", just missed the top spot, peaking at number two. The fifth single, "Look Around", peaked at number 69. A fourth number one single, "A Little Bit More," a duet with Melba Moore was also featured as an eleventh track on some editions of the album.

== Track listing ==
No.	Title	Writer(s)	Producer(s)	Length
1.	"Tasty Love"	Freddie Jackson; Paul Laurence	Laurence	4:28
2.	"Have You Ever Loved Somebody"	Barry Eastmond; Jolyon Skinner	Eastmond	4:37
3.	"Look Around."	Mike Campbell; Janice Dempsey; Laurence	Laurence	5:04
4.	"Jam Tonight"	Jackson; Laurence	Laurence	4:32
5.	"Just Like the First Time"	Howard King	King; Kevin "Chad" Robinson	3:58
6.	"I Can't Let You Go"	Garry Glenn; Dianne Quander	Glenn	4:50
7.	"I Don't Want to Lose Your Love"	Gene McFadden; James McKinney; Linda Vitali; J. Whitehead	McFadden	4:38
8.	"Janay"	McFadden; McKinney; Vitali	McFadden	4:58
9.	"Still Waiting"	Vaneese Thomas; Wayne Warnecke	Warnecke; Thomas	5:00
10.	"You Are My Love"	Laurence; Sonny Moore	Laurence	5:25
11.	"A Little Bit More" (Duet with Melba Moore)	McFadden; McKinney; Vitali	McFadden	4:54

== Personnel and credits ==
Musicians

- Freddie Jackson – vocals
- Paul Laurence – keyboards (1, 4), all instruments (3), all other instruments (10)
- Barry Eastmond – keyboards (2), synthesizers (2), drum programming (2)
- Eric Rehl – synthesizers (2), keyboards (4)
- Clive Smith – Fairlight programming (5)
- Garry Glenn – all other instruments (6)
- James McKinney – keyboards (7, 8), drum programming (7)
- Philip Field – acoustic piano (7)
- Robert Aries – keyboards (9)
- Wayne Warnecke – keyboards (9), drum programming (9)
- Mike "Dino" Campbell – guitars (1, 7, 8)
- Donald Griffin – guitars (6), bass (6)
- Andy Bloch – guitars (9)
- Timmy Allen – bass (1, 8, 10)
- Larry McCray – bass (5)
- Paul Adamy – bass (9)
- Leslie Ming – drums (4, 10)
- Curtis King – backing vocals (2)
- Vaneese Thomas – backing vocals (2, 9)
- Janice Dempsey – backing vocals (3)
- Yolanda Lee – backing vocals (3, 4)
- Cindy Mizelle – backing vocals (3, 4)
- Audrey Wheeler – backing vocals (3, 4)
- Jenny Peters – backing vocals (7, 8)
- Betsy Bircher – backing vocals (9)
- Francis Johnson – backing vocals (9)
- Carolyn Mitchell – backing vocals (9)
- Melba Moore – vocals (11)

Music arrangements

- Mike "Dino" Campbell – rhythm arrangements (3)
- Janice Dempsey – vocal arrangements (3)
- Paul Laurence – rhythm arrangements (3, 4, 10), vocal arrangements (4), orchestral arrangements (10)
- Sinclair Acey – horn and string arrangements (5)

Production

- Wayne Edwards – executive producer
- Beau Huggins – executive producer
- James McKinney – associate producer (7)
- Zack Vaz – production coordinator
- Anne Thomas – administrator
- Roy Korhara – art direction
- John O'Brien – design
- Carol Weinberg – photography
- Alfonso Grundy – make-up
- Mary Alice Orito – stylist
- Freddie Jackson – sleeve notes
- Hush Productions – management

Technical credits

- Sterling Sound (New York, NY) – mastering location
- Steve Goldman – engineer (1, 4)
- Ron Banks – engineer (2, 5–9)
- Bob Rosa – engineer (2)
- Rowe Shamir – engineer (2, 6–8)
- Richard Kaye – engineer (5)
- Wayne Warnecke – engineer (9)
- Joe Marno – second engineer (1), engineer (4)
- John Paul Cavanaugh – assistant engineer (5)
- Dennis Wall – assistant engineer (5)
- Arthur Zarate – assistant engineer (5)

== Charts ==
=== Weekly charts ===
Chart (1986–1987)	Peak position
UK Albums (Official Charts)	30
US Billboard 200	23
US Top R&B/Hip-Hop Albums (Billboard)	1

=== Year-end charts ===
Chart (1987)	Position
US Billboard 200	20
US Top R&B/Hip-Hop Albums (Billboard)	1

=== Singles ===
Year	Single	Chart positions	
Year	Single	U.S. Billboard Hot 100	US R&B
1986	"Tasty Love"	41	1
1986	"Have You Ever Loved Somebody"	69	1
1987	"Jam Tonight"	32	1
1987	"I Don't Want to Lose Your Love"	-	1
1987	"Look Around"	-	69

== Certifications ==
Region	Certification	Certified units/sales
United States (RIAA)	Platinum	1,000,000^{^}
^{^} Shipments figures based on certification alone.

== See also ==
- List of number-one R&B albums of 1986 (U.S.)
- List of number-one R&B albums of 1987 (U.S.)
- Billboard Year-End
