= List of Billboard number-one R&B albums of 1987 =

These are the Billboard magazine R&B albums that have reached number one on the chart in 1987.

== Chart history ==
Issue date	Album	Artist
January 3	Just Like the First Time	Freddie Jackson
January 10	Just Like the First Time	Freddie Jackson
January 17	Just Like the First Time	Freddie Jackson
January 24	Just Like the First Time	Freddie Jackson
January 31	Just Like the First Time	Freddie Jackson
February 7	Just Like the First Time	Freddie Jackson
February 14	Just Like the First Time	Freddie Jackson
February 21	Just Like the First Time	Freddie Jackson
February 28	Just Like the First Time	Freddie Jackson
March 7	Just Like the First Time	Freddie Jackson
March 14	Just Like the First Time	Freddie Jackson
March 21	Just Like the First Time	Freddie Jackson
March 28	Just Like the First Time	Freddie Jackson
April 4	Just Like the First Time	Freddie Jackson
April 11	Just Like the First Time	Freddie Jackson
April 18	Just Like the First Time	Freddie Jackson
April 25	Just Like the First Time	Freddie Jackson
May 2	Just Like the First Time	Freddie Jackson
May 9	Just Like the First Time	Freddie Jackson
May 16	Give Me the Reason	Luther Vandross
May 23	Just Like the First Time	Freddie Jackson
May 30	Just Like the First Time	Freddie Jackson
June 6	Jody Watley	Jody Watley
June 13	Just Like the First Time	Freddie Jackson
June 20	Jody Watley	Jody Watley
June 27	Jody Watley	Jody Watley
July 4	One Heartbeat	Smokey Robinson
July 11	Bigger and Deffer	LL Cool J
July 18	Bigger and Deffer	LL Cool J
July 25	Bigger and Deffer	LL Cool J
August 1	Bigger and Deffer	LL Cool J
August 8	Bigger and Deffer	LL Cool J
August 15	Bigger and Deffer	LL Cool J
August 22	Bigger and Deffer	LL Cool J
August 29	Bigger and Deffer	LL Cool J
September 5	If I Were Your Woman	Stephanie Mills
September 12	Bigger and Deffer	LL Cool J
September 19	Bigger and Deffer	LL Cool J
September 26	Bigger and Deffer	LL Cool J
October 3	Bad	Michael Jackson
October 10	Bad	Michael Jackson
October 17	Bad	Michael Jackson
October 24	Bad	Michael Jackson
October 31	Bad	Michael Jackson
November 7	Bad	Michael Jackson
November 14	Bad	Michael Jackson
November 21	Bad	Michael Jackson
November 28	Bad	Michael Jackson
December 5	Bad	Michael Jackson
December 12	Bad	Michael Jackson
December 19	Characters	Stevie Wonder
December 26	Bad	Michael Jackson

== See also ==
- 1987 in music
- R&B number-one hits of 1987 (USA)
