= Have You Ever Loved Somebody =

Single by Freddie Jackson

from the album Just Like the First Time
- B-side: "Tasty Love"
- Released: December 20, 1986
- Genre: R&B; soul
- Length: 4:37
- Label: Capitol
- Songwriters: Barry Eastmond; Jolyon Skinner
- Producer: Barry Eastmond

Freddie Jackson singles chronology
"Tasty Love" (1986)	"Have You Ever Loved Somebody" (1986)	"I Don't Want to Lose Your Love" (1987)

"Have You Ever Loved Somebody" is a song by American R&B singer Freddie Jackson, and third single released from his fourth studio album, Just Like the First Time. The song was written by Barry Eastmond and Jolyon Skinner.

== Chart performance ==
The single was his second release from the album Just Like the First Time issued on Capitol Records. Jackson scored his fifth number-one on the US Hot Black Singles chart, staying at the top spot for two weeks. The song was his third consecutive No. 1 R&B single after "Tasty Love" and "A Little Bit More" from the album.

"Have You Ever Loved Somebody" peaked at number 69 on the US Hot 100 Singles chart, Outside the US, "Have You Ever Loved Somebody" went to number 33 on the UK Singles Chart.

The music video for "Have You Ever Loved Somebody" was directed by Michael Oblowitz in Miami and New York, in 1986.

== Track listings and formats ==
- US 7" vinyl single

A. "Have You Ever Loved Somebody" – 4:16
B. "Tasty Love" (Instrumental) – 4:45

- US 12" vinyl single

A1. "Have You Ever Loved Somebody" – 4:36
B1. "Have You Ever Loved Somebody" (7" Edit) – 4:16
B2. "Tasty Love" (Instrumental) – 4:45

- Australia 7" vinyl single

A. "Have You Ever Loved Somebody" – 4:36
B. "Tasty Love" – 4:19

- Europe 7" vinyl single

A. "Have You Ever Loved Somebody" – 4:16
B. "Tasty Love" (Instrumental) – 4:45

- UK 2x 7" vinyl single

A. "Have You Ever Loved Somebody" – 4:18
B. "Tasty Love" (Instrumental) – 4:45
C. "Rock Me Tonight" (Live) – 6:42
D. "Have You Ever Loved Somebody" (Instrumental) – 5:15

- UK 2x 12" vinyl single (Limited Edition)

A1. "Have You Ever Loved Somebody" (Extended Remix) – 4:50
A2. "Tasty Love" (Instrumental) – 3:15
B. "Have You Ever Loved Somebody" (Extended Instrumental Remix) – 4:45
A. "Rock Me Tonight" (Extended Version) – 7:06
B. "I Wanna Say I Love You" – 4:33

- Remix and additional production by Zack Vaz

== Personnel ==
- Keyboards, Drum Programming – Barry Eastmond
- Background Vocals – Freddie Jackson, Curtis King, Vanessa Thomas
- Producer – Barry Eastmond
- Assistant Engineer – Rowe Shamir
- Synthesizer – Eric Rehl, Barry Eastmond
- Lead Vocals – Freddie Jackson
- Writer – Barry Eastmond, Jolyon Skinner
- Engineer – Ron Banks, Bob Rosa

== Charts ==
=== Weekly charts ===
Chart (1987)	Peak position
UK Singles Chart	33
US Billboard Hot 100	69
US Hot R&B/Hip-Hop Songs (Billboard)	1

== Samples ==
- This song was sampled for the Glasses Malone record "Sun Comes Up". Smooth jazz musician Najee covered the song featuring Jackson on his 1998 greatest hits album, The Best of Najee.
- Producer Dame Grease also sampled this for the track 'Have You Eva' by DMX (rapper) on his 2012 album Undisputed.

== In popular culture ==
- The song appears on the fictional in-game radio station The Vibe 98.8 in the 2008 video game Grand Theft Auto IV .

== See also ==
- R&B number-one hits of 1987 (USA)
