= Do Me Again =

Single by Freddie Jackson

from the album Do Me Again
- Released: 1991
- Length: 5:10
- Label: Capitol
- Songwriters: Paul Laurence; Lou Humphries; Darryl Dash
- Producer: Paul Laurence

Freddie Jackson singles chronology
"Love Me Down" (1990)	"Do Me Again" (1991)	"Main Course" (1991)

"Do Me Again" is a song by American singer Freddie Jackson and the second single from the self-title album of the same name. It was released in January 1991, the song spent one week at number one on the US Top R&B Singles chart, and was the last of ten singles by Jackson to reach the top spot.

== Track listings and formats ==
- US 12" vinyl single

A1. "Do Me Again" (Remix Version) – 5:07
A2. "Do Me Again" (Instrumental) – 4:17
B1. "Do Me Again" (Radio Edit) – 4:16
B2. "Do Me Again" (Let Freddie Do You Mix) – 6:43

- US CD single
1. "Do Me Again" (Radio Edit) – 4:16
2. "Do Me Again" (Remix Version) – 5:07
3. "Do Me Again" (Instrumental) – 4:17
4. "Do Me Again" (Let Freddie Do You Mix) – 6:43
5. "Do Me Again" (Let Freddie Do You Edit) – 5:01
6. "Do Me Again" (Let Freddie Groove You) – 5:08
7. "Do Me Again" (LP Version) – 5:10
- US Cassette single
1. "Do Me Again" (Remix Version) – 5:07
2. "Do Me Again" (Instrumental) – 4:17
3. "Do Me Again" (Let Freddie Do You Mix) – 6:43

Remix Versions and additional production by Goh Hotoda

== Credits ==
- Vocals, Backing vocals – Freddie Jackson
- Backing Vocals – Lillo Thomas, Maria Liuzzo, Paul Laurence, Yogi Lee
- Keyboards, Programming – Paul Laurence, DLA
- Writer – Louis Humphries, Darryl Dash, Paul Laurence
- Writer [Uncredited] – Alan Jones
- Executive-Producer – Beau Huggins, Scott Folks
- Producer, Arranger – Paul Laurence
- Mixed – Ron Banks
- Remixed, Engineer – Goh Hotada
- Programming [Additional] – Alan Friedman, Fred McFarlane

== Charts ==
Chart (1991)	Peak position
US Hot R&B/Hip-Hop Songs (Billboard)	1

== See also ==
- List of number-one R&B singles of 1991 (U.S.)
