= List of Billboard number-one R&B albums of 1986 =

These are the Billboard magazine R&B albums that have reached number one in 1986.

== Chart history ==
Issue date	Album	Artist
January 4	In Square Circle	Stevie Wonder
January 11	In Square Circle	Stevie Wonder
January 18	In Square Circle	Stevie Wonder
January 25	In Square Circle	Stevie Wonder
February 1	Promise	Sade
February 8	Promise	Sade
February 15	Promise	Sade
February 22	Promise	Sade
March 1	Promise	Sade
March 8	Promise	Sade
March 15	Promise	Sade
March 22	Promise	Sade
March 29	Promise	Sade
April 5	Promise	Sade
April 12	Promise	Sade
April 19	Control	Janet Jackson
April 26	Control	Janet Jackson
May 3	Control	Janet Jackson
May 10	Control	Janet Jackson
May 17	Control	Janet Jackson
May 24	Control	Janet Jackson
May 31	Control	Janet Jackson
June 7	Control	Janet Jackson
June 14	Winner in You	Patti LaBelle
June 21	Winner in You	Patti LaBelle
June 28	Winner in You	Patti LaBelle
July 5	Winner in You	Patti LaBelle
July 12	Winner in You	Patti LaBelle
July 19	Winner in You	Patti LaBelle
July 26	Winner in You	Patti LaBelle
August 2	Winner in You	Patti LaBelle
August 9	Love Zone	Billy Ocean
August 16	Raising Hell	Run–D.M.C.
August 23	Raising Hell	Run–D.M.C.
August 30	Raising Hell	Run–D.M.C.
September 6	Raising Hell	Run–D.M.C.
September 13	Raising Hell	Run–D.M.C.
September 20	Rapture	Anita Baker
September 27	Raising Hell	Run–D.M.C.
October 4	Rapture	Anita Baker
October 11	Raising Hell	Run–D.M.C.
October 18	Rapture	Anita Baker
October 25	Word Up!	Cameo
November 1	Word Up!	Cameo
November 8	Word Up!	Cameo
November 15	Word Up!	Cameo
November 22	Word Up!	Cameo
November 29	Give Me the Reason	Luther Vandross
December 6	Just Like the First Time	Freddie Jackson
December 13	Just Like the First Time	Freddie Jackson
December 20	Just Like the First Time	Freddie Jackson
December 27	Just Like the First Time	Freddie Jackson

== See also ==
- 1986 in music
- R&B number-one hits of 1986 (USA)
