= Falling (Melba Moore song) =

Single by Melba Moore

from the album A Lot of Love
- B-side: "Got To Have Your Love"
- Released: June 10, 1986
- Recorded: 1985
- Studio: Celestial Sound Studios, New York City
- Genre: R&B; soul
- Length: 4:44
- Label: Capitol
- Songwriters: Frannie Golde; Gene McFadden
- Producer: Gene McFadden

Melba Moore singles chronology
"A Little Bit More" (1986)	"Falling" (1986)	"I'm Not Gonna Let You Go" (1987)

"Falling" is a 1986 song by American singer Melba Moore. The track was released as the third single following "A Little Bit More," her number one R&B song with Freddie Jackson. The song is noteworthy for Moore's vocal dynamics, including a high note that she holds for nearly 20 seconds, ranking among the longest sustained notes in recorded pop music. Just like Moore's previous single, "Falling" peaked at number one on Billboard's Hot R&B Singles chart, for one week.

== Track listings and formats ==
- US, 7-inch single

A. "Falling" (Radio edit) – 4:20
B. "Got To Have Your Love" – 5:09

- US 12-inch Maxi-single

A. "Falling" (LP version) – 4:33
B. "Falling" (Edit) – 4:20

"Got To Have Your Love" (Written, Produced by Paul Laurence)

== Personnel ==
- Executive Producer – Beau Huggins
- Producer – Gene McFadden
