= A Little Bit More (Melba Moore song) =

Single by Melba Moore featuring Freddie Jackson

from the album A Lot of Love and Just Like the First Time
- B-side: "When We Touch (It's Like Fire)"
- Released: April 12, 1986
- Recorded: 1985
- Studio: Celestial Sound Studios, New York City
- Genre: R&B; soul
- Length: 4:15 (Radio edit)
- Label: Capitol
- Songwriters: Gene McFadden; James McKinney; Linda Vitali
- Producer: Gene McFadden

Melba Moore singles chronology
"Love the One I'm With (A Lot of Love)" (1986)	"A Little Bit More" (1986)	"Falling" (1986)

Freddie Jackson singles chronology
"Love Is Just a Touch Away" (1986)	"A Little Bit More" (1986)	"Tasty Love" (1986)

"A Little Bit More" is a R&B song by singer Melba Moore. It was the second single released from her album A Lot of Love and featuring vocals by R&B singer Freddie Jackson, also featured on his second album Just Like the First Time. The song was co-written and produced by Gene McFadden.

It was Moore’s most successful single on the US R&B Songs chart, where it spent one week at number one. The single failed to make the Hot 100.

== Track listings and formats ==
- US, 7-inch single

A. "A Little Bit More" (Radio edit) – 4:15
B. "When We Touch (It's Like Fire)" – 4:25

- UK, 12-inch single

A. "A Little Bit More" (LP version) – 4:54
B. "Calling" (performed by Freddie Jackson) – 5:30
B1. "It's Been So Long" (Remix) – 6:06

Notes
"When We Touch (It's Like Fire" (written and produced by Ernie Poccia, Vaneese Thomas, Wayne Warnacke)
"Calling" (written by Keith Diamond, Barry Eastmond, produced by Barry Eastmond)
"It's Been So Long" (written by Chad, Howard King, produced by Howard King)

== Credits ==
- Executive-Producer – Beau Huggins
- Vocals – Melba Moore
- Engineer, Mixed – Ron Banks
- Producer – Gene McFadden
- Vocals [Duet With] – Freddie Jackson
- Writer – G. McFadden, James McKinney, Linda Vitali
- Mixed – Gene McFadden, Zack Vaz
- Mastered – Jack Skinner

== Charts ==
Chart (1986)	Peak position
UK Singles Chart	96
US Hot R&B/Hip-Hop Songs (Billboard)	1

== See also ==
- List of number-one R&B singles of 1986 (U.S.)
