= You Are My Lady =

1985 single by Freddie Jackson

""You Are My Lady""

Single by Freddie Jackson

from the album Rock Me Tonight
- B-side: "I Wanna Say I Love You"
- Released: August 1985
- Recorded: 1985
- Genre: R&B, soul
- Length: 4:44
- Label: Capitol
- Songwriter: Barry J. Eastmond
- Producer: Barry J. Eastmond

Freddie Jackson singles chronology
"Rock Me Tonight (For Old Times Sake)" (1985)	""You Are My Lady"" (1985)	"She's Not A Sleaze" (1985)

"You Are My Lady" is a song by American singer Freddie Jackson following his debut single, "Rock Me Tonight (For Old Times Sake)." It was the second single from his debut album, Rock Me Tonight.

Like his debut single, "You Are My Lady" hit number one on the R&B chart, peaking the week of October 5, 1985, and was Jackson's most successful crossover single of his career, reaching number 12 on the Hot 100. It also peaked at number 3 on the US Adult Contemporary chart.

== Track listings and formats ==
- US 7" vinyl single

A. "You Are My Lady" (Single Version) – 4:07
B. "I Wanna Say I Love You" (Special Theme Version) – 2:45

- Netherlands 7" vinyl single

A. "You Are My Lady" (LP Version) – 4:42
B. "I Wanna Say I Love You" (Special Theme Version) – 4:35

- UK 7" 2x vinyl single (Limited Edition)

A. "You Are My Lady" – 4:07
B. "I Wanna Say I Love You" (Special Theme Version) – 2:45
A. "Rock Me Tonight (For Old Times Sake)" – 3:59
B. "Rock Me Tonight (For Old Times Sake)" (Groove Version) – 5:00

- Australia 7" vinyl single

A. "You Are My Lady" – 4:07
B. "I Wanna Say I Love You" – 4:38

== Credits and personnel ==
- Executive-Producer – Beau Huggins, Varnell Johnson
- Producer, writer keyboards, synthesizer, drum Programming – Barry Eastmond
- Vocals, writer – Freddie Jackson
- Producer, writer, keyboards, synthesizer, drum programming – Paul Laurence
- Mixed – Steve Goldman
- Engineer – Joe Marno
- Backing Vocals – Reggie King, Paul Laurence
- Mastered – Eddy Schreyer
- Engineer Assistant – Eddy Schreyer

== Charts ==
=== Weekly charts ===
Chart (1985-86)	Peak position
UK Singles Chart	49
US Adult Contemporary (Billboard)	3
US Billboard Hot 100	12
US Hot R&B/Hip-Hop Songs (Billboard)	1

== See also ==
- List of number-one R&B singles of 1985 (U.S.)
