= Love the One I'm With =

"Love the One I'm With (A Lot of Love)" is a 1987 single by Melba Moore on the Capitol label. It peaked at No. 5 on the Billboard Hot Black Singles chart and features Kashif, released from her hit album, A Lot of Love. Unlike the other singles from the album, it did not peak at number one.

== Vinyl ==
12" version

1. Love the One I'm With (A Lot of Love)
2. Love the One I'm With Club Mix
3. Love the One I'm With Club Edit

7" version

1. Love the One I'm With (Melba & Kashif)
2. Don't Go Away
