= Paul Laurence =

American songwriter, producer and keyboardist

- Born: Paul Lawrence Jones III; November 29, 1958 (age 67)
- Origin: Harlem, New York City, United States
- Genres: R&B, soul
- Occupations: Singer, songwriter, record producer
- Instruments: Vocals, piano, keyboards
- Years active: 1980–present
- Labels: Capitol, RCA, Orpheus

Paul Laurence (a.k.a. Paul Lawrence Jones III; born 1958) is an American songwriter, producer and keyboardist. He had several number one R&B hits Freddie Jackson's "Rock Me Tonight (For Old Times Sake)," "Jam Tonight," "Tasty Love," "Hey Lover," "Do Me Again"; Stephanie Mills' "(You're Puttin') A Rush on Me"; and Meli'sa Morgan's "Do Me Baby." His other credits include Evelyn King's number one R&B hits "I'm in Love" and "Love Come Down," as well as Lillo Thomas' "(You're A) Good Girl," "Your Love's Got a Hold on Me," "Settle Down," "Sexy Girl," and "Wanna Make Love (All Night Long)".

== Career ==
Laurence and Jackson attended school and church together at Harlem's White Rock Baptist Church, which is where the duo met in the 1970s. Laurence had been taught piano by a fellow church member Valerie Simpson of the hit songwriting team Ashford & Simpson. Laurence started a group, Laurence Jones Ensemble, which included Jackson, and they performed in New York-area clubs. By the 1980s, both Laurence and Jackson were working for manager Beau Higgins' Hush Productions. Laurence had written Hush signee Melba Moore's "Love's Comin' at Ya" (number five R&B, summer 1982), "Keepin' My Lover Satisfied," and "Love Me Right" and would go on to co-write with Ondrea Dawkins-Duverney the enchanting ballad "I'm Not Gonna Let You Go." Jackson was one of Moore's background singers. He also sang on demos of Laurence's songs.

In 1985, Jackson had signed as a Hush artist and began recording his debut album. Laurence wrote a swaying ballad, "Rock Me Tonight (For Old Times Sake)," especially for Jackson and played keyboards and programmed drums on the track. Also on the date was bassist Timmy Allen, guitarist Mike "Dino" Campbell, and background vocalist Reggie King. Huggins got Jackson a record deal with Capitol Records, the same label Melba Moore was signed to. He produced and wrote Jackson's "Rock Me Tonight (For Old Times Sake)" which earned gold record status, staying at number one R&B for six weeks on Billboard's charts during summer 1985. The album, Rock Me Tonight, went platinum, hitting number one R&B, number ten pop in summer 1985.

Laurence produced a cover of Prince's "Do Me Baby" for fellow Hush signee and Capitol recording artist Meli'sa Morgan. The ballad parked at number one R&B for three weeks in early 1986. Laurence co-wrote "Tasty Love" with Freddie Jackson, which held the number one R&B position for four weeks in late 1986. A week earlier Jackson was in the number one R&B spot on a duet with Melba Moore, "A Little Bit More." "Tasty Love" was Jackson's fourth number one R&B single included on his platinum LP, Just Like the First Time, number one R&B. Another single from the album, "Jam Tonight" was another Laurence/Jackson song and years earlier was one of the songs that got the attention of Melba Moore during one of Jackson's club appearances. She then hired Jackson as a background vocalist. "Jam Tonight" jumped to number one R&B in summer 1987 and became a steppers classic. In late 1988, Laurence produced Jackson's eighth number one R&B hit "Hey Lover" written by singer Keith Washington and Sonny Moore. The smooth number was on Jackson's gold number one R&B LP Don't Let Love Slip Away. Other Laurence/Jackson hits were "Do Me Again" (Laurence/Humphrey/Jones/Dash), a number one R&B hit in early 1991, and "Main Course," a number two R&B hit from spring 1991 from the LP Do Me Again.

For former Broadway star and hit recording artist Stephanie Mills, Laurence produced and co-wrote with Timmy Allen the chugging "(You're Puttin') A Rush on Me," giving the singer her third number one R&B hit in fall 1987. The single with the instrumental version on the flip made it to number 85 pop and was included on her gold album If I Were Your Woman.

Laurence had several hits with Brooklyn singer/Capitol recording artist Lillo Thomas: "(You're A) Good Girl," "Your Love's Got a Hold on Me," "(Can't Take Half) All of You" (a duet with Melba Moore), "Settle Down," "Sexy Girl" (Laurence/Timmy Allen), "I'm in Love" that went to number two R&B in spring 1987, and "Wanna Make Love (All Night Long)."

With all of this success, Laurence was afforded the opportunity to become a recording artist. Signing with Capitol, Laurence's debut LP, the critically acclaimed Haven't You Heard, was released in late 1985. The first single, "She's Not a Sleaze," featured Freddie Jackson and Lillo Thomas and charted number 50 R&B in late 1985. Other singles for Laurence were "Strung Out," "You Hooked Me," "There Ain't Nothin' (Like Your Lovin')", another solo effort – 1989's Underexposed – featured three singles: “Cut The Crap” (featuring Janice Dempsey), “Make My Baby Happy” and “I Ain’t Wit It”. Laurence also contributed to the soundtrack of the 1990 horror film Def by Temptation starring Kadeem Hardison of NBC-TV's The Cosby Show spin-off, A Different World.

Paul Laurence-related releases are the movie soundtrack to Spike Lee's Do the Right Thing, Keith Washington's Make Time for Love, Tanya Blount's Natural Thing, Styrenes' All the Wrong People Are Dying, and 1999's Silent Night, Soulful Night.

== Discography ==
=== Studio albums ===
| Year | Album | Label |
|---|---|---|
| 1985 | Haven't You Heard | Capitol Records |
| 1989 | Underexposed | Capitol Records |

=== Singles ===
| Year | Single | Chart positions | |
| Year | Single | US R&B | UK |
|---|---|---|---|
| 1985 | "She's Not a Sleaze" (with Lillo Thomas & Freddie Jackson) | 50 | 121 |
| 1986 | "Strung Out" | 48 | 87 |
| 1986 | "You Hooked Me" | 55 | — |
| 1989 | "I Ain't wit It" | 83 | — |
| 1989 | "Make My Baby Happy" | 77 | — |
| 1989 | "Cut the Crap" | — | — |
"—" denotes the single failed to chart
