= Rock Me Tonight =

1985 debut album by Freddie Jackson

Studio album by Freddie Jackson
- Released: April 28, 1985
- Recorded: January–March 1985
- Studios: Digital By Dickinson (Bloomfield, New Jersey); Celestial Sound Studios, Unique Recording Studios and Right Track Recording (New York City, New York)
- Genres: R&B; soul
- Length: 41:26
- Label: Capitol
- Producers: Paul Laurence; Robert Aries; Barry Eastmond

Freddie Jackson chronology
Rock Me Tonight (1985)	Just Like the First Time (1986)

Singles from Rock Me Tonight
- 1. "Rock Me Tonight (For Old Times Sake)" Released: April 2, 1985; 2. "You Are My Lady" Released: August 13, 1985; 3. "He'll Never Love You (Like I Do)" Released: 1985; 4. "Love Is Just a Touch Away" Released: 1986

Professional ratings
Review scores
Source	Rating
AllMusic	4.5/5 stars

Rock Me Tonight is the platinum-selling 1985 debut album from American R&B/Soul singer Freddie Jackson. Released on April 28, 1985, the album yielded four top-10 singles on the U.S. R&B chart, with the first two, "You Are My Lady" and "Rock Me Tonight (For Old Times Sake)", reaching number one. The latter two, "Love Is Just a Touch Away" and "He'll Never Love You", peaked at Nos. 9 and 8, respectively. The album contains a cover of the Billie Holiday classic "Good Morning Heartache". The success of Rock Me Tonight garnered Jackson a Grammy Award nomination in 1986 for Best New Artist, losing out to Sade. Rock Me Tonight went on to top the R&B Albums chart for 14 nonconsecutive weeks, and peaked inside the Top 10 on the Billboard 200.

== Track listing ==
No.	Title	Writer(s)	Producer(s)	Length
1.	"He'll Never Love You (Like I Do)"	Keith Diamond; Barry Eastmond	Eastmond	4:43
2.	"Love Is Just a Touch Away"	Freddie Jackson; Eastmond	Eastmond	5:19
3.	"I Wanna Say I Love You"	Jackson; Eastmond	Eastmond	4:40
4.	"You Are My Lady"	Eastmond	Eastmond	4:44
5.	"Rock Me Tonight (For Old Times Sake)"	Paul Laurence	Laurence	7:12
6.	"Sing a Song of Love"	Eastmond	Eastmond	5:02
7.	"Calling"	Diamond; Eastmond	Eastmond	5:30
8.	"Good Morning Heartache"	Ervin Drake; Dan Fisher; Irene Higginbotham	Robert Aries	4:28

== Personnel ==
- Freddie Jackson – lead vocals, backing vocals
- Barry Eastmond – keyboards, synthesizers, TR-808 drum programming
- Eric Rehl – synthesizers
- Paul Laurence – Yamaha DX7 (4, 5), Oberheim DMX drum programming (4, 5), keyboards (5), Kurzweil synthesizer (5), backing vocals (5)
- Robert Aries – keyboards (8), Kurzweil synthesizer (8), drum programming (8)
- Ira Siegel – acoustic guitar, guitars
- Fareed Abdul-Haqq – guitars
- Clarence "Binky" Brice – guitars
- Mike "Dino" Campbell – guitars
- Thomas J. Flammia – guitars
- Wayne Brathwaite – bass
- Timmy Allen – bass (5)
- Bernard Davis – drums
- Richard Rodriguez – drums
- Joel Rosenblatt – drums
- Terry Silverlight – drums
- Buddy Williams – drums
- Bashiri Johnson – percussion
- Steve Kroon – percussion
- V. Jeffrey Smith – saxophone
- Stanley Turrentine – sax solo (8)
- Janice Dempsey – backing vocals
- Dolly Eastmond – backing vocals
- Danny Madden – backing vocals
- Cindy Mizelle – backing vocals
- Melba Moore – backing vocals
- B.J. Nelson – backing vocals
- Lillo Thomas – backing vocals
- Audrey Wheeler – backing vocals
- Reggie King – backing vocals (5)

== Production ==
- Beau Huggins – executive producer
- Varnell Johnson – executive producer
- Anne Thomas – administrator
- Zack Vaz – production coordinator
- Roy Kohara – art direction
- Roland Young – design
- Chris Callis – photography
- Freddie Jackson – sleeve notes
- Hush Productions, Inc. – management

Technical credits

- Jack Skinner – mastering at Sterling Sound (New York, NY)
- Ron Banks – engineer (1–4, 6, 7)
- Carl Beatty – engineer (5)
- Steve Goldman – engineer (5), mixing (5)
- Peter Robbins – engineer (8), mixing (8)
- Bob Rose – engineer (8)
- Dean Cochren – assistant engineer (1–4, 6, 7)
- Larry DeCarmine – assistant engineer (1–4, 6, 7)
- Cathy Goode – assistant engineer (1–4, 6, 7)
- Frank Heller – assistant engineer (1–4, 6, 7), engineer (8)
- Kurt Upper – assistant engineer (1–4, 6, 7)
- Joe Marno – second engineer (5)
- Mike Nicolette – assistant engineer (8)

== Charts ==
=== Weekly charts ===
Chart (1985)	Peak position
US Billboard 200	10
US Top R&B/Hip-Hop Albums (Billboard)	1
Chart (1986)	Peak position
Australian Albums (Kent Music Report)|	99

=== Year-end charts ===
Chart (1985)	Position
US Billboard 200	74
US Top R&B/Hip-Hop Albums (Billboard)	6

=== Singles ===
Year	Single	Chart positions	
Year	Single	U.S. Billboard Hot 100	US R&B
1985	"Rock Me Tonight (For Old Times Sake)"	18	1
1985	"You Are My Lady"	12	1
1985	"He'll Never Love You (Like I Do)"	25	8
1986	"Love Is Just A Touch Away"	-	9

== See also ==
- List of number-one R&B albums of 1985 (U.S.)
