= Unique Recording Studios =

Former recording studio in New York City

Coordinates: 40.7592°N 73.9843°W

- Type: Recording Studio
- Industry: Audio
- Founded: 1978
- Defunct: 2004
- Headquarters: New York City, U.S.
- Key people: Bobby Nathan; Joanne Georgio-Nathan
- Products: URS plugins
- Website: uniquerecording.com

Unique Recording Studios was a five-room recording studio operating near Times Square in New York City from 1978 until 2004. Founders and co-owners Bobby Nathan and Joanne Georgio-Nathan installed the first Otari 24-track tape deck in New York. The studio was known for its extensive collection of synthesizers, which attracted Steve Winwood, who jammed for many hours in the process of creating his multi-Grammy winning album Back in the High Life (1986) at Unique.

== Founders ==
Bobby Nathan was born in New York, and learned to play guitar at age 11. In 1965 in his late teens, he played clubs on the Jersey Shore with his band the Pipers. In September 1973, Bobby met Joanne Georgio and they formed a band called Uptown, playing the Tri-State area, shifting to steady gigs in New York City. Georgio and Nathan married. In 1976 Uptown broke up and the Nathans formed another band called Strawberry, playing disco clubs, and backing disco singers such as Gloria Gaynor. In 1977 Strawberry became a trio with a drummer supporting Joanne and Bobby both on keyboards. In 1978 while playing at Disco Sally's on 55th and Seventh Ave, the Nathans asked former Gaynor guitarist John Fetter to join the band, and Strawberry was renamed Unique "The Disco Experience". It was during these touring years that the Nathans began hauling around a larger-than-usual number of synthesizers for both to play, which would become a signature attraction of Unique Recording Studios.

== Studio history ==
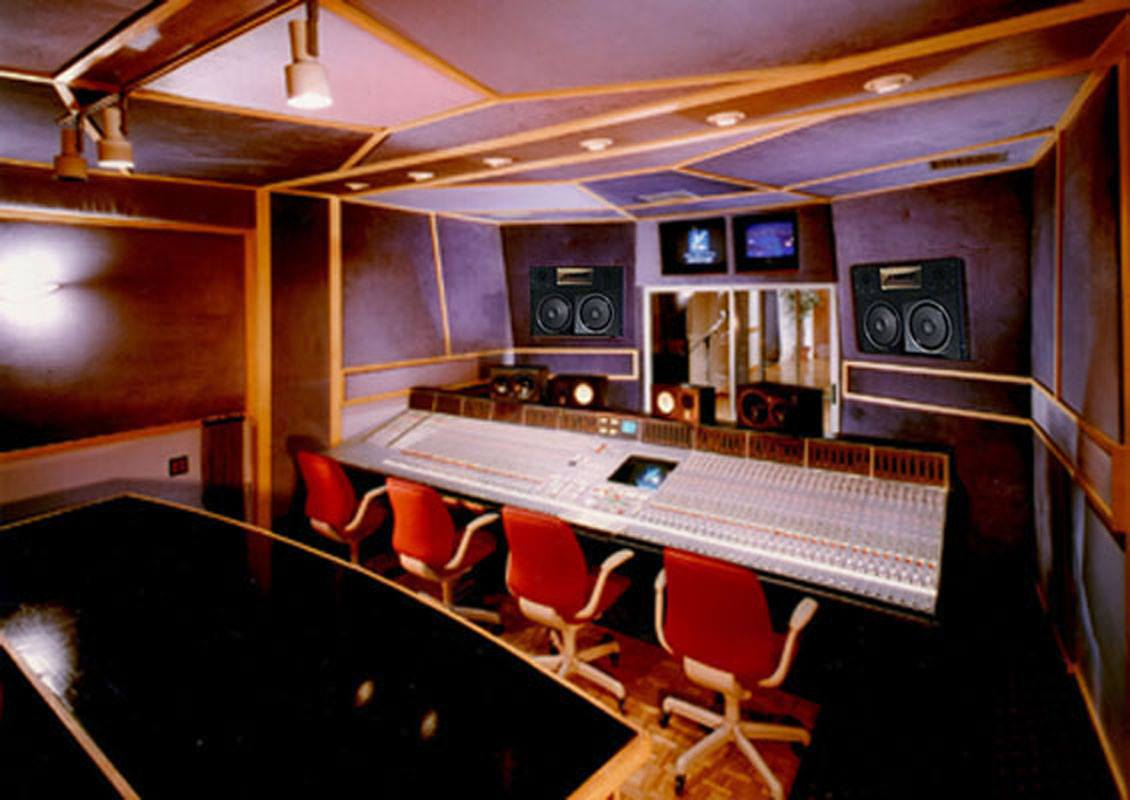
Studio C in 1998 showing the Solid State Logic 9064J series console with 64 inputs

Unique Recording Studios started as a one-room rehearsal studio with a Tascam 8-track recorder in 1978, catering to new wave and hip hop artists. Early customers included Polyrock and Bill Laswell. In May 1980, the facility quickly expanded to 16 tracks and a 28 Input Sound Workshop series 30 console. In September 1980, Ian McDonald co-founder of Foreigner came to Unique to record a 16 track solo project. By November 1980, McDonald ran out of tracks and became the catalyst for the studios jump to 24 tracks with the first Otari MTR-90 tape recorder. In 1981 the facility upgraded with a 36 input MCI JH-600 series mixer with automation and Tommy Boy Records began asking for lengthy bookings to accommodate their artists, especially Planet Patrol. Planet Patrol's Arthur Baker also started to produce other artists, and his bookings eventually required a second room. Into this larger space Baker brought New Edition, which recorded Candy Girl at Unique during 1982, with Baker and Maurice Starr co-producing. Candy Girl reached number 90 on the Billboard 200, staying on the chart for 33 weeks.

The studio complex was located in Manhattan just off of Times Square in the top three floors of the Cecil B. DeMille Building, adjacent to music-store row. The business was owned and operated by husband and wife team Joanne and Bobby Nathan. The Nathans described themselves as "the pioneers in drum machines, samplers and digital recording on personal computers.

Unique Recording Studios is credited for opening the first MIDI recording room in 1983 called "Midi City" which was later named Studio C, located upstairs from Studio A. The studio could hold 30 synthesizers, with room left over for sequencers and interfaces. Wall jacks made wiring easier and neater. The innovative concept gained Unique a nomination for the 1985 TEC Awards in the recording studio category.

The studio was well known for its large collection of synthesizers and drum machines. Unique was one of the first studios to own a Polymoog synth, as well as the Minimoog, the ARP 2600, the Oberheim OB-X and Oberheim Eight Voice, and a Prophet 5. When Steve Winwood showed up in 1985 to get further inspiration for his project Back in the High Life, he booked all-nighters at Unique and played every synth, jamming with any other studio clients who were willing to join. Back in the High Life was recorded largely at Unique by Tom Lord-Alge with assistance from his brother Chris; Tom remembers taking an impromptu drum break played between songs by drummer John Robinson, and moving it to the beginning of "Higher Love", which satisfied producer Russ Titelman as the album opener. Titelman recalls that Winwood had been recording the album for a year at other studios but had reached a point where he needed more inspiration. Titelman brought the project to Unique for the variety of MIDI-connected synthesizers and for the familiar mixer – a Solid State Logic SL 4000E identical to the one at Winwood's home studio. Titelman obtained a huge drum sound by recording Robinson's drum kit in the center of Unique's main studio, surrounded by eight extra ambient microphones. The song "Higher Love" won a Grammy Award for the best single record of 1987, and the album won a Grammy for the best engineered album, honoring Tom's mix: his first time as head engineer. Chris recalled that the Lord-Alge brothers' status at Unique was raised after the success of the album: "Even though I'd had hits [before Unique], Bobby and Joanne Nathan insisted that I start out as an assistant, and they worked me really hard. But once Back in the High Life hit, it made it a lot easier for Tommy and me to do no wrong at Unique."

In early 1986 before Back in the High Life was released, Unique reported to Billboard that they had renovated their main studio with a larger control room so that more outboard processing gear and MIDI synthesizer modules could be placed next to the SSL 4000E 48-channel mixer with Total Recall automation. Recording units included two linked Otari MTR-90 Mk II decks each with 24 tracks, and one Studer A-80 half-inch 2-track for stereo mastering. Video decks were installed to feed a video projector so that audio-for-television projects could be accommodated. The studio also owned a 32-channel Neve 8068 mixer that had been in Electric Lady Studios. Unique was nominated a second time for a TEC Award in 1987.

Unique kept pace with technology developments by adding Pro Tools digital audio workstation (DAW) rigs to their studios, connected to 24-channel interfaces made by Digidesign and Focusrite. A total of five DAWs were installed by 1998.

After the September 11 attacks hit New York, the city’s music industry was in a slowdown. The vintage Neve console was removed from Studio D in 2002 for sale to Glenwood Place, a new studio fitting out in Burbank, California. Nathan said that a vintage Neve in the tracking room was more of a trend in California. Studio D continued as a Pro Tools rig with Neve and API preamps. In 2003, Unique introduced a suite of plugins for Pro Tools, called Unique Recording Software (URS). The plugins offered emulation of classic analog equalizers. Through the URS plugin package, Unique picked up a third nomination for a TEC Award in the Software and Signal Processing category in 2004. However, this industry honor was not enough to keep the business afloat, and Unique was shuttered in June 2004. Major clients were no longer renting time on a Pro Tools rig, they were instead buying one for the artist's home studio.

The URS plugin products continued to be developed and sold after Unique closed. In 2008, a plugin named Classic Console Strip Pro was nominated for a TEC Award.

== Notable recording and mixing projects ==
Artist	Album	Year released	Billboard 200	Top R&B/Hip-Hop	Certification
Material	Discourse - Single	1980			
Material	Temporary Music	1981			
Peter Tork & the New Monks	(I'm Not Your) Steppin' Stone	1981			
Johnny Copeland	Make My Home Where I Hang My Hat	1982			
Man Parrish	Hip Hop Be Bop (Don't Stop)	1982			
Afrika Bambaataa & Soulsonic Force	Renegades of Funk	1983			
Freeez	I.O.U.	1983			
Hashim	"Al-Naafiysh (The Soul)"	1983			
Johnny Copeland	Texas Twister	1983			
Jonzun Crew	Lost In Space	1983			
Malcolm X	No Sell Out	1983			
MC G.L.O.B.E. & Whiz Kid	"Play That Beat Mr. DJ"	1983			
New Edition	Candy Girl	1983	90	1	
Planet Patrol	Planet Patrol	1983		64	
Shannon	Let The Music Play	1983	32	11	Gold
Cameo	She's Strange	1983	27	1	Gold
Afrika Bambaataa & James Brown	Unity	1983		87	
Billy Ocean	Suddenly	1984	9	9	2× Platinum
Force MDs	"Love Letters"	1984	185	28	
La Toya Jackson	Heart Don't Lie	1984	149	65	
Melba Moore	Read My Lips	1984	130	24	
Pet Shop Boys	West End Girls	1984			
Cheap Trick	Standing on the Edge	1985	35		
Force MDs	Chillin'	1985	69	14	
Freddie Jackson	Rock Me Tonight	1985	10	1	Platinum
James Brown	Rocky IV (soundtrack)Living In America	1985	10	10	Platinum
Michael Bolton	The Hunger	1985	46		2× Platinum
Afrika Bambaataa & Soulsonic Force	Planet Rock: The Album	1986			
Bob James & David Sanborn	Double Vision	1986	50	16	Platinum
Carly Simon	Coming Around Again	1986	25		Platinum
Chaka Khan	Destiny	1986	67	24	
Don Johnson	Heartbeat	1986	17		Gold
Pointer Sisters	Hot Together	1986	48	39	
Pretty In Pink Soundtrack	Orchestral Manoeuvres in the Dark If You Leave (song)	1986	5		Gold
Steve Winwood	Back in the High Life	1986	3		3× Platinum
Ice-T	Rhyme Pays	1987	93	23	Gold
Stephanie Mills	If I Were Your Woman	1987	30	1	Gold
The Fat Boys	Crushin'	1987	8	4	Platinum
Al B Sure	In Effect Mode	1987	20	1	2× Platinum
Ramones	Halfway to Sanity	1987	172		
Information Society	Information Society (album)	1988	25	78	Gold
Run DMC	Tougher Than Leather	1988	9	2	Platinum
Tommy Page	Tommy Page	1988	166		
Heavy D & The Boys	Big Tyme	1989	19	1	Platinum
Public Enemy	Do the Right Thing Fight the Power	1989	68	11	Gold Single
Keith Sweat	Keep It Comin'	1991	20	1	Platinum
Kool Moe Dee	Knowledge Is King	1989	25	2	Gold
Nine Inch Nails	Pretty Hate Machine	1989	75		3× Platinum
Al B. Sure!	Private Times...and the Whole 9!	1990	20	4	Gold
Madonna	The Immaculate Collection Justify My Love	1990	2	42	Diamond
Celine Dion	Unison	1990	74		Platinum
Teenage Mutant Ninja Turtles	Coming Out of There Shells	1990			Platinum
Color Me Badd	C.M.B. I Wanna Sex You Up	1991	3	1	3× Platinum
Kool Moe Dee	Funke, Funke Wisdom	1991	72	19	Gold
Heavy D & The Boys	Peaceful Journey	1991	21	5	Platinum
Naughty By Nature	Juice (soundtrack) Uptown Anthem	1991	17	3	Gold
Naughty By Nature	Naughty By Nature (album) O.P.P.	1991	16	10	Platinum
Miles Davis	Doo-Bop	1992	1 Jazz	25	
Naughty By Nature	19 Naughty III	1992	3	1	Platinum
SWV	It's About Time	1992	8	2	3× Platinum
LL Cool J	14 Shots to the Dome	1993	5	1	Gold
Queen Latifah	Black Reign	1992	60	15	Gold
2Pac	Strictly 4 My N.I.G.G.A.Z...	1993	24	4	Platinum
Aaron Hall	The Truth	1993	47	7	Platinum
Poetic Justice Usher	Call Me a Mack	1993	23	19	Gold
Run-DMC	Down with the King	1993	7	1	Gold
2Pac	Me Against The World	1994	1	1	2× Platinum
Anita Baker	Rhythm of Love	1994	3	1	2× Platinum
Nas	Illmatic	1994	12	2	2× Platinum
Junior M.A.F.I.A.	Conspiracy	1995	8	2	Gold
Mobb Deep	The Infamous	1995	18	10	Gold
Madeleine Peyroux	Dreamland	1996			
Lil Kim	Hard Core	1996	11	3	2× Platinum
Capone-N-Noreaga	The War Report	1997	21	4	Gold
KRS-One	I Got Next	1997	3	2	Gold
Big Pun	Capital Punishment	1998	5	1	Platinum
Mos Def & Talib Kweli Are Black Star	Black Star	1998	58	13	
Lord Tariq & Peter Gunz	Make It Reign Deja Vu	1998	38	8	Platinum single
Mary J. Blige	Mary "Give Me You"	1999	2	1	2× Platinum
Ruff Ryders	Ryde or Die Vol. 1	1999	1	1	Platinum
Nelly	Country Grammar	2000	1	1	Diamond
Adonis Mitzelos	Beyond the Light	2000			
Pink	Can't Take Me Home	2000	26	23	2× Platinum
Alicia Keys	Songs in A Minor	2001	1	1	6× Platinum
Brian McKnight	Superhero Groovin' Tonight (featuring St. Lunatics)	2000	7	4	Gold
St Lunatics	Free City	2001	3	1	Platinum
DMX	Cradle 2 the Grave Soundtrack "X Gon' Give it to Ya"	2003	6	3	Gold
Joe Bonamassa	Blues Deluxe	2003	8 Blues		
Joe Bonamassa	Had to Cry Today	2004	5 Blues		

== Grammy, AMA, MTV Awards ==
Grammy Awards earned by artists for projects that passed through Unique.

Year	Artist	Album	Award	Category	Status
1985	Billy Ocean	Suddenly Caribbean Queen (No More Love on the Run)	Grammy	Best Male R&B Vocal Performance	Won
1985	Shannon (American singer)	Let The Music Play	Grammy	Best Female R&B Vocal Performance	Nominated
1985	Melba Moore	Read My Lips	Grammy	Best Female R&B Vocal Performance	Won
1986	Freddie Jackson	Rock Me Tonight	Grammy	Best New Artist	Won
1986	Jimmy Cliff	Cliff Hanger	Grammy	Best Reggae Album	Won
1986	Steve Winwood	Back in the High Life	Grammy	Album of The Year	Nominated
1986	Steve Winwood	Back in the High Life Higher Love	Grammy	Song of The Year	Nominated
1986	Steve Winwood	Steve Winwood & Russ Titelman	Grammy	Non- Classicical Producer of The Year	Nominated
1986	Steve Winwood	Back in the High Life	Grammy	Record of The Year	Won
1986	Steve Winwood	Back in the High Life Higher Love	Grammy	Best Pop Performance – Male	Won
1986	Steve Winwood	Back in the High Life	Grammy	Best Engineered Non- Classical Album	Won
1987	Bob James and David Sanborn	Double Vision Since I Fell For You	Grammy	Best R&B Vocal Performance, Male	Won
1987	Bob James and David Sanborn	Double Vision (Bob James and David Sanborn album)	Grammy	Best Jazz Fusion Performance, Vocal or Instrumental	Won
1987	James Brown	Rocky IV (soundtrack) Living in America	Grammy	Best R&B Vocal Performance, Male	Won
1988	Joe Cocker	Unchain My Heart	Grammy	Best Solo Rock Vocal Performance, Male	Nominated
1988	Joe Cocker	Unchain My Heart	Grammy	Best Solo Rock Vocal Performance	Nominated
1987	Anita Baker	Compositions	Grammy	Best Female R&B Vocal Performance	Won
1990	Public Enemy	Fight the Power	Grammy	Best Rap Performance	Nominated
1991	Naughty By Nature	Naughty by Nature (album) O.P.P.	Grammy	Best Rap Performance by a Duo or Group	Nominated
1992	Color Me Badd	C.M.B. I Wanna Sex You Up	Grammy	Best New Artist	Nominated
1992	Color Me Badd	C.M.B. I Wanna Sex You Up	Grammy	Best R&B Performance by a Duo or Group with Vocal	Nominated
1992	Naughty By Nature	Naughty by Nature (album) O.P.P.	AMA	Favorite New Artist – Rap / Hip-Hop	Won
1993	Inner Circle (band)	Bad Boys	Grammy	Best Reggae Album by a Duo or Group	Won
1993	Miles Davis	Doo-Bop	Grammy	Best R&B Instrumental Performance	Won
1993	Naughty By Nature	19 Naughty III Hip Hop Hooray	Grammy	Best Rap Performance by a Duo or Group	Nominated
1994	Toni Braxton	Toni Braxton (album)	Grammy	Best New Artist	Won
1994	Toni Braxton	Toni Braxton (album)	Grammy	Best Female R&B Vocal Performance	Won
1994	Toni Braxton	Toni Braxton (album)	AMA	Favorite Soul/R&B New Artist	Won
1994	Toni Braxton	Toni Braxton (album)	AMA	Favorite New Adult Contemporary Artist	Won
1994	Toni Braxton	Toni Braxton (album)	AMA	Favorite Soul/R&B Album	Won
1995	Anita Baker	I Apologize	Grammy	Best Female R&B Vocal Performance	Won
1996	Naughty By Nature	Poverty's Paradise	Grammy	Best Rap Album	Won
1996	Naughty By Nature	Feel Me Flow	Grammy	Best Rap Performance by a Duo or Group	Nominated
1996	SWV	It's About Time	Grammy	Best New Artist	Nominated
1997	Get Shorty	Soundtrack	Grammy	Best Instrumental Composition Written for a Motion Picture or for Television	Nominated
1999	Big Pun	Capital Punishment	Grammy	Best Rap Album	Nominated
1999	Ruff Ryders	Ryde or Die Vol.1 Ruff Ryders' Anthem	MTV VA	Best Rap Video	Nominated
2001	Nelly	Country Grammar	Grammy	Best Rap Album	Nominated
2001	Nelly	Country Grammar	Grammy	Best Rap Solo Performance	Nominated
2001	Pink	Can't Take Me Home	AMA	Favorite Soul/R&B New Artist	Nominated
2002	Alicia Keys	Songs in A Minor Fallin' (Alicia Keys song)	Grammy	Song of the Year	Won
2002	Alicia Keys	Songs in A Minor Fallin' (Alicia Keys song)	Grammy	Best R&B Song	Won
2002	Alicia Keys	Songs in A Minor Fallin' (Alicia Keys song)	Grammy	Best Female R&B Vocal Performance	Won
2002	Alicia Keys	Songs in A Minor	Grammy	Best New Artist	Won
2002	Alicia Keys	Songs in A Minor	Grammy	Best R&B Album	Won
2002	Nelly	Country Grammar Ride wit Me	Grammy	Best Rap Solo Performance	Won
