= Rock Me Tonight (For Old Times Sake) =

1985 single by Freddie Jackson

Single by Freddie Jackson

from the album Rock Me Tonight
- B-side: "Rock Me Tonight (Groove Version)"
- Released: April 2, 1985
- Recorded: 1985
- Genre: R&B, soul
- Length: 3:59
- Label: Capitol/EMI
- Songwriter: Paul Laurence
- Producer: Paul Laurence

Freddie Jackson singles chronology
"Rock Me Tonight (For Old Times Sake)" (1985)	"You Are My Lady" (1985)

"Rock Me Tonight (For Old Times Sake)" is a song by American R&B singer Freddie Jackson. It was released as Jackson’s debut single from the namesake debut title album, Rock Me Tonight issued on Capitol Records. The popular ballad was written and produced by Paul Laurence. It was the top-selling R&B single for 1985 and was Jackson's first of ten entries to hit the number-one spot on the US R&B Songs chart.

"Rock Me Tonight (For Old Times Sake)" was number one for six weeks on the Billboard Hot Black Singles chart and reached number 18 on the Hot 100 singles chart. It also reached number 18 in the UK Singles Chart in March 1986.

== Track listings and formats ==
- US 7" vinyl single

A. "Rock Me Tonight (For Old Times Sake)" (Single Edit) – 3:59
B. "Rock Me Tonight (For Old Times Sake)" (Groove Mix) – 5:00

- UK 12" vinyl single

A. "Rock Me Tonight (For Old Times Sake)" (LP Version) – 7:06
B1 "Rock Me Tonight (For Old Times Sake)" – 3:59
B2 "Rock Me Tonight (For Old Times Sake)" (Groove Version) – 5:00

- New Zealand 7" vinyl single

A. "Rock Me Tonight (For Old Times Sake)" – 3:59
B. "Rock Me Tonight (For Old Times Sake)" (Groove Version) – 5:00

- Spain 12" vinyl single

A. "Rock Me Tonight (For Old Times Sake)" – 7:04
B1 "Rock Me Tonight (For Old Times Sake)" – 3:59
B2 "Rock Me Tonight (For Old Times Sake)" (Groove) – 5:00

== Credits and personnel ==
- Mixed – Steve Goldman
- Executive-Producer – Beau Huggins, Varnell Johnson
- Vocals, vocal arrangement – Freddie Jackson
- Backing Vocals – Paul Laurence, Reggie King
- Bass – Timmy Allen
- Producer, writer, keyboards, drum programming, synthesizer – Paul Laurence
- Engineer – Joe Marno

== Charts ==
=== Weekly charts ===
Chart (1985)	Peak position
UK Singles Chart	18
US Billboard Hot 100	18
US Hot R&B/Hip-Hop Songs (Billboard)	1

== See also ==
- List of number-one R&B singles of 1985 (U.S.)
- Billboard Year-End
