= Tasty Love =

Single by Freddie Jackson

from the album Just Like the First Time
- B-side: "I Wanna Say I Love You"
- Released: October 28, 1986
- Genre: R&B; soul
- Length: 4:28
- Label: Capitol
- Songwriters: Paul Laurence Jones; Freddie Jackson
- Producer: Paul Laurence

Freddie Jackson singles chronology
"A Little Bit More" (1986)	"Tasty Love" (1986)	"Have You Ever Loved Somebody" (1986)

"Tasty Love" is a song by American singer Freddie Jackson. It was written by Paul Laurence and Jackson, and produced by Laurence. It was released as the lead single from his second album, Just Like the First Time, it was Jackson's fourth number–one single on the US Hot R&B chart, where it held the top spot for four weeks. The single also made the US Hot 100, where it peaked at forty-one.

== Track listings and formats ==
- US 7" vinyl single

A. "Tasty Love" – 4:10
B. "I Wanna Say I Love You" – 4:38

- US 12" vinyl single

A1. "Tasty Love" – 7:08
B1. "Tasty Love" (Single Version) – 4:10
B2. "I Wanna Say I Love You" – 4:45

- Europe 12" vinyl single

A1. "Tasty Love" – 7:08
B1. "Tasty Love" (Single Version) – 4:10
B2. "I Wanna Say I Love You" – 4:38

- France 7" vinyl single

A1. "Tasty Love" – 4:10
B1. "I Wanna Say I Love You" – 4:38

== Personnel ==
- Guitar – Mike Campbell
- Keyboards – Paul Laurence
- Bass – Timmy Allen
- Assistant Engineer – Joe Marino
- Producer – Paul Laurence
- Vocals, Backing Vocals – Freddie Jackson
- Writer – Paul Laurence, Freddie Jackson
- Engineer – Steve Goldman
- Executive-Producer – Beau Huggins, Wayne Edwards

== Charts ==
=== Weekly charts ===
Chart (1986)	Peak position
UK Singles Chart	73
US Billboard Hot 100	41
US Hot R&B/Hip-Hop Songs (Billboard)	1

=== Year-end charts ===
Chart (1987)	Position
US Hot R&B/Hip-Hop Songs (Billboard)	37

== See also ==
- List of number-one R&B singles of 1986 (U.S.)
