= Lillo Thomas =

American soul musician (born 1961)

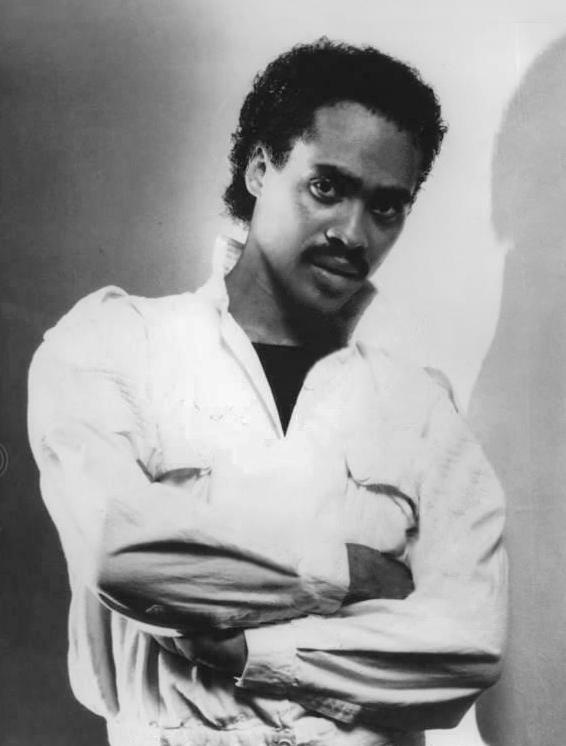
- Thomas in 1984

Background information
- Born: 1961 (age 64–65); Brooklyn, New York, U.S.
- Genres: Soul
- Occupation: Singer
- Instrument: Vocals
- Years active: 1977–present
- Label: Capitol

Lillo Thomas (born 1961) is an American sprint runner and soul musician. He reached the peak of his success as a recording artist in the 1980s. His most famous songs include "Sexy Girl" and "I'm in Love."

== Career ==
Early in his life, Thomas was a competitive sprint runner. He retired from athletics in 1984 after a car accident in Brazil.

Thomas then quickly established his musical career. His first album, released in 1983 on Capitol Records, charted at #23 on the R&B Albums record charts. Let Me Be Yours also launched his first solo hit, "(You're A) Good Girl", which peaked at #22 on the Hot R&B/Hip-Hop Singles & Tracks. Also a successful session vocalist, he worked with Evelyn "Champagne" King, Kashif, James Ingram, and George Benson, but developed a special relationship with Melba Moore. He wrote the song "Mind Up Tonight" for her and joined her on tour in 1984 as her protégé. That same year, he released his second solo album, "All of You", which climbed to #9 on the R&B Albums chart and also reached #186 on the Billboard 200.

In 1985, Thomas toured with comedian Eddie Murphy, but 1987 was the pinnacle of success for his music career when his album Lillo released to become #10 on the R&B Albums chart and launched his most successful single, "I'm in Love." The song reached #2 on the Hot R&B/Hip-Hop Singles & Tracks chart. Two other singles charted, with "Downtown" reaching #11 and "Sexy Girl" at #9 on the same chart.

Thomas returned to recording with a brand new single in 1993. "Out There Doing Wrong", was written, arranged and produced by Thomas and released on THG Music.

In 2010, he released his fourth album, Come and Get It. In 2012, Thomas released his "Greatest Hits" album on the Fitingo Music Label. In 2024, Thomas provided vocals on the title track of Stetsasonic's album Here We Go Again.

Thomas lives in Westchester with his wife Kim, a VP in the Beauty industry. He is also an accomplished painter.

== Discography ==
=== Albums ===
Year	Album	Label	Peak chart positions		
Year	Album	Label	US R&B	US 200	UK
1983	Let Me Be Yours	Capitol Records	23	—	—
1984	All of You	Capitol Records	9	186	—
1987	Lillo	Capitol Records	10	—	43
2001	The Very Best of Lillo Thomas	The Finest Records	—	—	—
2010	Come and Get It	Fitingo Music	—	—	—
2012	Greatest Hits	Fitingo Music	—	—	—
"—" denotes releases that did not chart or were not released in that territory

=== Singles ===
Year	Single	Label	Peak chart positions			
Year	Single	Label	US R&B	US Hot 100	US Dance	UK
1983	"You're A (Good Girl)"	Capitol Records	22	—	—	106
1983	"Who Do You Think You Are?"	Capitol Records	68	—	—	—
1983	"I Love It"	Capitol Records	—	—	—	168
1983	"Hot Love"	Capitol Records	—	—	—	—
1983	"Just My Imagination (Running Away with Me)"	Capitol Records	79	—	—	—
1984	"Your Love's Got a Hold on Me"	Capitol Records	11	102	—	—
1984	"(Can't Take Half) All of You" (with Melba Moore)	Capitol Records	28	—	—	—
1984	"My Girl"	Capitol Records	—	—	—	—
1984	"Settle Down"	Capitol Records	60	—	47	66
1987	"Sexy Girl"	Capitol Records	9	—	—	23
1987	"I'm in Love"	Capitol Records	2	—	—	54
1987	"Downtown"	Capitol Records	11	—	43	77
1987	"Wanna Make Love (All Night Long)"	Capitol Records	7	—	—	—
1993	"Out There Doing Wrong"	THG Music	—	—	—	—
2010	"Rubbing Your Body"	Fitingo Music	—	—	—	—
"—" denotes releases that did not chart or were not released in that territory
