= Barry Eastmond =

American musician, composer, songwriter, and record producer (born 1959)

- Born: Barry James Eastmond; January 11, 1959 (age 67)
- Occupations: Musician; songwriter; record producer
- Years active: 1985–present
- Website: barryeastmond.com

Barry James Eastmond (born January 11, 1959) is an American musician, composer, songwriter, and record producer. Eastmond is an adjunct professor of songwriting at the Steinhardt Performing Arts Department of New York University and has participated in the New York University Summer Songwriting Workshop.

== Biography ==
Eastmond was born in Brooklyn, New York on January 11, 1959. He is the youngest of three children of Wilfred and Eileen Eastmond. He is married to songwriter Maria Eastmond and they have two children, Melodie and Barry Jr.

Eastmond started his musical career as pianist at the age of four. Between the ages of seven and ten, he received classical music training at the Juilliard School of Music's preparatory school. While in high school, Eastmond began playing in local top 40 and wedding bands in Brooklyn. Soon, he became a touring pianist and keyboardist for female R&B singers such as Melba Moore, Phyllis Hyman, Angela Bofill, and Chaka Khan, eventually becoming Moore, Hyman, and Bofill's musical director. At the same time, he worked as a session musician for production duo Gamble & Huff and established himself as a songwriter and arranger.

In 1985, Eastmond wrote and produced singer Freddie Jackson's "You Are My Lady," his first professional producer credit. The second single from Jackson's debut album Rock Me Tonight (1985), it peaked at number one on the US Billboard Hot R&B/Hip-Hop Songs, prompting Capitol Records to hire Eastmond as the album's main producer. Eastmond's success with Jackson led him to work with Billy Ocean, Britney Spears, Kenny Lattimore, Aretha Franklin, Whitney Houston, Al Jarreau, George Benson, Vanessa Williams, Steve Perry, Michael Bolton, Jeffrey Osborne, Phil Perry, Jonathan Butler, Regina Belle, and Barry White, as well as many others. In 1994, he and Gordon Chambers co-wrote with Anita Baker "I Apologize," which earned Baker a Grammy Award for Best R&B Vocal. In 1996, he was hand-picked by Sylvia Rhone to write and produce "Missing You", Brandy, Gladys Knight, Tamia, and Khan's song for the Set It Off soundtrack.

As of 2013, Eastmond was an adjunct professor of songwriting at the Steinhardt Performing Arts Department of New York University and was on the faculty for the New York University Summer Songwriting Workshop.
