= Freddie Jackson =

American rhythm and blues singer (1957-2026)

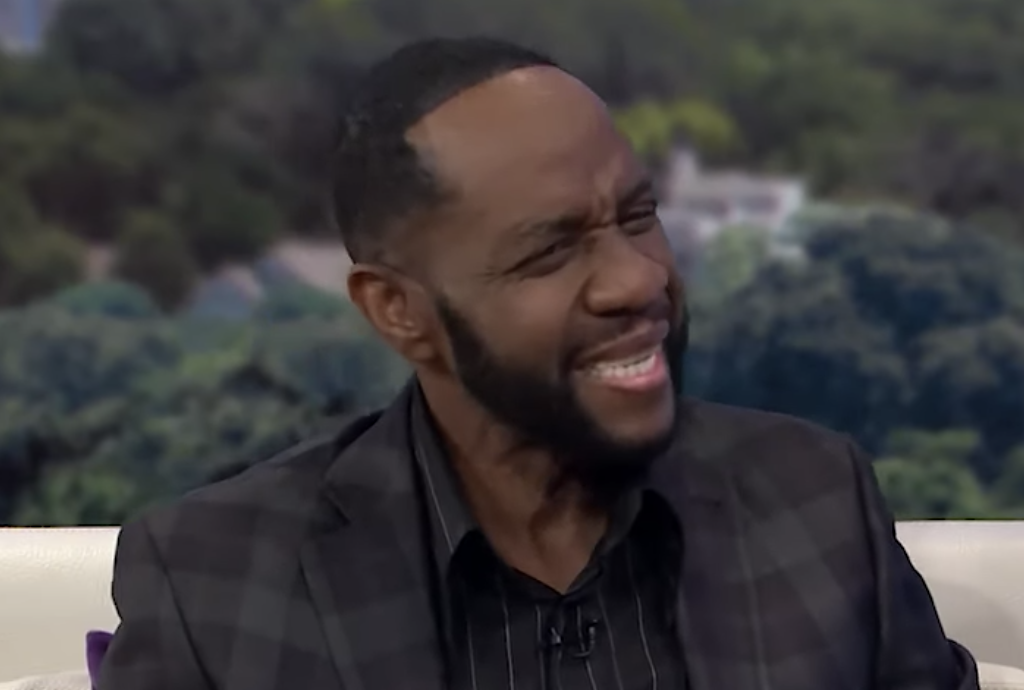
- Jackson interviewed by Sister Circle TV in 2019

Background information
- Born: October 2, 1957; New York City, U.S.
- Died: October 5, 2026 (aged 69)
- Genres: R&B; soul; funk
- Occupation: Singer
- Instruments: Vocals; piano
- Years active: 1979–2026
- Labels: Capitol/EMI; RCA; Orpheus; Climax Entertainment; BMG
- Website: freddiejackson.net

Frederick Anthony Jackson (October 2, 1957 – October 5, 2026) was an American R&B singer and songwriter. Originally from New York City, Jackson began his professional music career in the late 1970s with the California funk band Mystic Merlin. Among his well-known R&B/soul hits are "Rock Me Tonight (For Old Times Sake)" (1985), "Have You Ever Loved Somebody" (1986), "Jam Tonight" (1986), "Do Me Again" (1990), and "You Are My Lady" (1985). He contributed to the soundtrack for the 1989 film All Dogs Go to Heaven, with the Michael Lloyd–produced duet "Love Survives" alongside Irene Cara. He also appeared on Family Matters as himself, and in the film King of New York.

== Early life and education ==
Jackson was born in the Harlem section of New York City, on October 2, 1957. He was trained as a gospel singer from an early age, singing at the White Rock Baptist Church of Harlem. There he met Paul Laurence, who would later become his record producer and songwriting partner. After completing school, Jackson joined Laurence's group LJE (Laurence Jones Ensemble) and played the New York nightclub scene. During the late 1970s, Jackson moved to the West Coast and sang lead with the band Mystic Merlin (with which he released three studio albums, 1980–1982), but soon returned to New York to work with Laurence at Hush Productions.

== Career ==
=== 1981–2013: Solo artist ===
Jackson sang on demo recordings of Laurence's compositions, and also served as a backing singer for Melba Moore after she saw his nightclub act in 1981. In 1984, Jackson landed a recording contract with Capitol Records, and released his debut album, Rock Me Tonight in 1985. The Laurence-penned title track stormed the R&B chart, spending six weeks at number one, and made Jackson an instant hit on urban contemporary radio. "You Are My Lady" gave him a second straight R&B chart-topper, and also proved to be his highest-charting single on the Billboard Hot 100, peaking at No. 12. With "He'll Never Love You (Like I Do)" and "Love Is Just a Touch Away" also hitting the R&B Top Ten, Rock Me Tonight topped the R&B album chart and went platinum. Jackson issued the follow-up Just Like the First Time 1986, on the heels of a number one R&B duet with Melba Moore, "A Little Bit More" (from her album A Lot of Love). Another platinum seller, Just Like the First Time, continued Jackson's dominance of the R&B singles charts: "Tasty Love", "Have You Ever Loved Somebody", and "Jam Tonight" all hit No. 1, while "I Don't Want to Lose Your Love" went to No. 2.

The pace of Jackson's success slowed with the 1988 release of Don't Let Love Slip Away, which nonetheless featured another two R&B chart-toppers in "Hey Lover" and "Nice 'N' Slow." The title track of 1990's Do Me Again and "Love Me Down" duplicated that feat, and "Main Course" just missed, topping out at No. 2. Even so, Jackson's earlier placings in the lower reaches of the Billboard Hot 100 had long since disappeared, and some critics charged that his albums were growing too similar to one another. Jackson appeared as a lounge singer on the 1989 The Golden Girls episode "Two Rode Together" and sang the Disney song "It's a Small World" to Sophia. Also in 1989, Jackson sang the duet "Love Survives" with Irene Cara for the soundtrack to the film All Dogs Go to Heaven.

Seeking a new beginning, Jackson parted ways with Capitol/EMI in late 1993, and signed with RCA/BMG Records. His label debut, Here It Is, appeared the following year, with diminished commercial returns. Following a Christmas album, Jackson split with RCA and recorded Private Party for the smaller Street Life imprint of Scotti Brothers Records in 1995. Several years of silence ensued, until Orpheus issued Life After 30 in late 1999; the equally low-key release Live in Concert followed in 2000. After returning to the charts with It's Your Move in February 2004 (Martland Entertainment), Jackson released his tenth studio album, Transitions, in September 2006 on the record label Orpheus Music. At the end of 2010, Jackson released a new album on the Entertainment One Music label, entitled For You, and produced by hit songwriter Barry Eastmond. The album featured the single "I Don't Wanna Go".

=== 2014–2026: Later years ===
On August 26, 2014, Jackson released the single "Love & Satisfaction", written by Dustin "Dab" Bowie, Gregory Bowman, Kameron Corvet, Bertram Ford Jr., and Selasi "The African Kid", and released by the entertainment company Climax Entertainment. The single received some positive reviews and airplay, and allowed Jackson to reintroduce himself as he toured internationally in support of the release, as well as appear with artists Jeffrey Osborne, Peabo Bryson, Melba Moore, and Stephanie Mills at various performances and festivals. In late 2016, Jackson announced that he was recording a new album and that a new single would be released early the following year to mark his true return to recording studio and on May 1, 2017, the lead single "One Night" from his forthcoming album Love Signals was released via Climax and reached No. 1 on the internet radio Indie Soul chart associated with the Internet Broadcasters Alliance on June 12, 2017, while reaching in the top 50 of independent R&B, smooth jazz, and soul charts around the U.S. and Europe. In January 2018, Jackson appeared on the cover of STS Entertainment and Fashion Magazine. He performed in Albany, Georgia on April 21, 2018, at a Soul Music festival along with the 69 boys and various other performers. In August 2019, it was announced that Jackson would perform later that month as the headlining act of the 37th annual African World Festival, hosted by the Charles H. Wright Museum of African American History. In 2019, Jackson released the single "A Million Ways".

A fiction piece in the November 25, 2019, issue of The New Yorker, by John Edgar Wideman, titled "Arizona", was written as a letter to Jackson.

== Death ==
Jackson died on the evening of October 5, 2026, three days after his 69th birthday. His PR team announced his death on social media the following day.

His funeral took place on October 19, 2026, at Mount Neboh Baptist Church in Harlem, New York, and was attended by notable friends, including Melba Moore and Valerie Simpson. He was laid to rest at Kensico Cemetery in Valhalla, New York.

== Discography ==
- Rock Me Tonight (1985)
- Just Like the First Time (1986)
- Don't Let Love Slip Away (1988)
- Do Me Again (1990)
- Time for Love (1992)
- Here It Is (1994)
- At Christmas (1994)
- Private Party (1995)
- Life After 30 (1999)
- It's Your Move (2004)
- Personal Reflections (2005)
- Transitions (2006)
- For You (2010)
- Love Signals (2018)

== Tours ==
- Tasty Love Tour (1986–87)
- Hey Lover Tour (1988–89)
- Do Me Again Tour (1991)
- Finer with Time Tour (Summer 2014)
- One Night Tour (Spring/Summer 2017)

== Awards ==
- 1985 – nominated for Grammy Award: Best New Artist
- 1985 – nominated for Grammy Award: Best Rhythm & Blues Vocal Performance – Male ("You Are My Lady")
- 1986 – nominated for American Music Award for Favorite Male Artist – Soul / Rhythm & Blues
- 1987 – nominated for Soul Train Music Award for Favorite Soul/R&B Album – Male (Rock Me Tonight)
- 1987 – nominated for Soul Train Music Award for Favorite Soul/R&B Song – Male ("Tasty Love")
- 1988 – won American Music Award: Favorite Soul / Rhythm & Blues Single ("Nice 'N' Slow")

== See also ==
- List of people from Harlem
