= Hot R&B/Hip-Hop Songs =

US record chart published by Billboard

The Hot R&B/Hip-Hop Songs chart ranks the most popular R&B and hip hop songs in the United States and is published weekly by Billboard. Rankings are based on a measure of radio airplay, sales data, and streaming activity. The chart had 30 positions at its inception in 1958, growing to 60 by 1973, when it was expanded to 100. In October 2012, it was shortened to 50 positions.

The chart is used to track the success of popular music songs in urban, or primarily African-American, venues. Dominated over the years at various times by jazz, blues, R&B, doo-wop, rock and roll, soul, and funk, it is today dominated by contemporary R&B and hip hop. Since its inception, the chart has changed its name many times in order to accurately reflect the industry at the time.

== History ==
Beginning in 1942, Billboard published a chart of bestselling African-American music, first as the Harlem Hit Parade, then as Race Records. Then in 1949, Billboard began publishing a Rhythm and Blues chart, which entered "R&B" into mainstream lexicon. These three charts were consolidated into a single Hot R&B Singles chart in October 1958.

From November 30, 1963, to January 23, 1965, there were no Billboard R&B singles charts. The "Hot R&B Singles" chart was discontinued when Billboard determined it unnecessary due to so much crossover of titles between the R&B and pop charts in light of the rise of Motown. The chart was reinstated as Hot Rhythm & Blues Singles on January 30, 1965.

Beginning August 23, 1969, the chart was renamed to Best Selling Soul Singles. The move was made by a Billboard editorial decision that the term "soul" more accurately accounted for the "broad range of song and instrumental material which derives from the musical genius of the black American". Beginning on July 14, 1973, the chart title was modified slightly to Hot Soul Singles. In late June 1982, the chart was renamed again, this time to Hot Black Singles because the music that African-Americans were buying and listening to had a "greater stylistic variety than the soul sound" of the early 1970s. Black Singles was deemed an acceptable term to encompass pop, funk, and early rap music popular in urban communities.

Beginning October 27, 1990, the Hot Black Singles chart was returned to the Hot R&B Singles name first used in 1958. In the December 5, 1992, issue of Billboard, a new Bubbling Under Hot R&B Singles chart was introduced, modeled on the Bubbling Under Hot 100. Hip hop was introduced to the chart beginning with the December 11, 1999 issue, when Billboard changed the name to Hot R&B/Hip-Hop Singles & Tracks to recognize the influence and relationship of hip hop to the genre. Within a few years, the crossover of R&B titles onto the pop chart was so significant that all Top Ten songs on the Billboard Hot 100 chart on October 11, 2003, were by black artists. The lengthy title was shortened to Hot R&B/Hip-Hop Songs on April 30, 2005.

The chart's methodology was changed starting with the October 20, 2012 issue, to match the Billboard Hot 100's---incorporating digital downloads and video streaming data (R&B/Hip-Hop Digital Songs) and combining it with airplay of R&B and hip-hop songs across all radio formats, to determine song position. Also at this time, the chart was shortened to 50 positions.

Date range	Title
October 1942 – February 1945	The Harlem Hit Parade
February 1945 – June 1949	Race Records
June 1949 – October 1958	Rhythm & Blues Records (two or three separate charts—see above)
October 1958 – October 1962	Hot R&B Sides
November 1962 – November 1963	Hot R&B Singles
November 1963 – January 1965	No chart published (see above)
January 1965 – August 1969	Hot Rhythm & Blues Singles
August 1969 - July 1973	Best Selling Soul Singles
July 1973 - June 1982	Hot Soul Singles
June 1982 – October 1990	Hot Black Singles
October 1990 – January 1999	Hot R&B Singles
January – December 1999	Hot R&B Singles & Tracks
December 1999 – April 2005	Hot R&B/Hip-Hop Singles & Tracks
April 2005 – present	Hot R&B/Hip-Hop Songs

== Significant song achievements ==
=== Most weeks at number one ===
36 weeks

- "I Just Might" (2026) – Bruno Mars

31 weeks

- "Luther" (2024–25) – Kendrick Lamar and SZA

22 weeks

- "Not Like Us" (2024–25) – Kendrick Lamar

21 weeks

- "Kill Bill" (2022–23) – SZA

20 weeks

- "Old Town Road" (2019) – Lil Nas X featuring Billy Ray Cyrus

18 weeks

- "The Honeydripper (Parts 1 & 2)" (1945–46) – Joe Liggins and His Honeydrippers (number one on the "Juke Box Race Records" chart)
- "Choo Choo Ch'Boogie" (1946) – Louis Jordan and His Tympany Five (number one on the "Juke Box Race Records" chart)
- "One Dance" (2016) – Drake featuring Wizkid and Kyla
- "Industry Baby" (2021–22) – Lil Nas X and Jack Harlow

17 weeks

- "Ain't Nobody Here but Us Chickens" (1947) – Louis Jordan and His Tympany Five (number one on the "Juke Box Race Records" chart)

16 weeks

- "Hey! Ba-Ba-Re-Bop" (1946) – Lionel Hampton and His Orchestra (number one on the "Juke Box Race Records" chart)
- "Blurred Lines" (2013) – Robin Thicke featuring T.I. and Pharrell
- "Mutt" (2025) – Leon Thomas

15 weeks

- "Trouble Blues" (1949) – Charles Brown Trio (number one on the "Best Sellers Race Records" chart)
- "Be Without You" (2006) – Mary J. Blige
- "Lovin on Me" (2023–24) – Jack Harlow

=== Songs with most weeks on the chart ===
- 89 weeks – "Sure Thing" – Miguel (2011)
- 75 weeks – "Be Without You" – Mary J. Blige (2005)
- 74 weeks – "God In Me" – Mary Mary (2009)
- 73 weeks – "On the Ocean" – K'Jon (2009)
- 71 weeks

"You Make Me Wanna..." – Usher (1997)
"There Goes My Baby" – Usher (2010)

- 70 weeks – "Step in the Name of Love" – R. Kelly (2003)
- 68 weeks – "Can't Let Go" – Anthony Hamilton (2005)
- 66 weeks – "Blinding Lights" - The Weeknd (2020)
- 63 weeks – "In My Bed" – Dru Hill (1997)
- 61 weeks – "Cool" – Anthony Hamilton, David Banner (2008)
- 60 weeks – "Too Close" – Next (1998)
- 59 weeks –

"Pretty Wings" – Maxwell (2009)
"Un-Thinkable (I'm Ready)" – Alicia Keys (2010)

- 58 weeks –

"When I See U" – Fantasia (2007)
"Teachme" – Musiq Soulchild (2007)
"Love on Top" – Beyoncé (2011)

- 56 weeks –

"If I Ain't Got You" – Alicia Keys (2004)
"Lost Without U" – Robin Thicke (2007)
"Until the End of Time" – Justin Timberlake & Beyoncé (2008)

- 55 weeks –

"Heaven Sent" – Keyshia Cole (2008)
"Spotlight" – Jennifer Hudson (2008)
"Drank in My Cup" – Kirko Bangz (2011)
"Adorn" – Miguel (2012)
"Snooze" – SZA (2023)

- 54 weeks –

"Ain't I" – Yung L.A., Young Dro, T.I.
"Stay" – Tyrese (2011)
"Thrift Shop" – Macklemore & Ryan Lewis feat. Wanz (2012)

- 52 weeks –

"We Belong Together" – Mariah Carey (2005)
"Up!" – LoveRance feat. Iamsu & Skipper or 50 Cent (2011)
"Thinkin Bout You" – Frank Ocean (2013)
"Can't Hold Us" – Macklemore & Ryan Lewis feat. Ray Dalton (2013)
"All of Me" – John Legend (2014)
“Luther” – Kendrick Lamar & SZA (2025)

=== Longest climbs to number one ===
- 43rd week – "Step in the Name of Love" by R. Kelly
- 35th week – "All of Me" by John Legend
- 32nd week – "Needed Me" by Rihanna

== Significant artist achievements ==
=== Most number-one singles ===
The artists with the most No. 1 hits on the Hot R&B/Hip-Hop Songs chart since October 1958.

Number of singles	Artist	Source
33	Drake	
20	Aretha Franklin	
20	Stevie Wonder	
17	James Brown	
16	Janet Jackson	
15	The Temptations	
13	Marvin Gaye	
13	Michael Jackson	
13	Usher	
12	Lil Wayne	

=== Artists with most weeks at number one on the chart ===
Weeks	Artist	Source
113†	Louis Jordan	

† Pre-October 1958 charts.

=== Most top 10 singles ===
Number of Singles	Artist	Source
157	Drake	
57	James Brown	
53	Lil Wayne	
50	Future	
47	Nicki Minaj	
44	The Temptations	
44	Chris Brown	
44	Kanye West	
40	Kendrick Lamar	
38	Jay-Z	
38	Lil Baby	

=== Most chart entries ===
Most entries on chart since October 1958.

Entries	Artist	Source
417	Drake	
317	Future	
235	Lil Wayne	
194	Kanye West	
190	Lil Baby	
158	Chris Brown	
152	Jay-Z	
152	Travis Scott	
146	Nicki Minaj	
121	Eminem	

=== Self-replacement at number one ===
- Dinah Washington, July 25, 1960: "A Rockin' Good Way (to Mess Around and Fall in Love)" with Brook Benton replaced by "This Bitter Earth"
- Freddie Jackson, November 15, 1986: "A Little Bit More" with Melba Moore replaced by "Tasty Love"
- Nelly, August 24, 2002: "Hot in Herre" replaced by "Dilemma" featuring Kelly Rowland
- Jay-Z, August 16, 2003: "Crazy in Love" (Beyoncé featuring Jay-Z) replaced by "Frontin'" (Pharrell featuring Jay-Z)
- 50 Cent, April 16, 2005: "Candy Shop" featuring Olivia replaced by "Hate It or Love It" (The Game featuring 50 Cent)
- Alicia Keys, January 5, 2008: "No One" replaced by "Never See Me Again" (Kanye West)
- Drake, February 26, 2011: "Fall for Your Type" (Jamie Foxx featuring Drake) replaced by "Moment 4 Life" (Nicki Minaj featuring Drake)
- Lil Wayne, July 26, 2011: "Motivation" (Kelly Rowland featuring Lil Wayne) replaced by "I'm on One" (DJ Khaled featuring Drake, Rick Ross, and Lil Wayne)
- Drake, February 25, 2012: "Make Me Proud" featuring Nicki Minaj replaced by "The Motto" featuring Lil Wayne
- 2 Chainz, August 18, 2012: "Mercy" with Kanye West, Big Sean, and Pusha T replaced by "No Lie" featuring Drake
- Macklemore & Ryan Lewis, May 4, 2013: "Thrift Shop" featuring Wanz replaced by "Can't Hold Us" featuring Ray Dalton
- The Weeknd, October 3, 2015: "Can't Feel My Face" replaced by "The Hills"
- Drake, Feb. 20, 2016: "Work" (Rihanna featuring Drake) replaced by "Summer Sixteen"
- DJ Khaled, July 29, 2017: "I'm the One" featuring Justin Bieber, Quavo, Chance the Rapper, and Lil Wayne replaced by "Wild Thoughts" featuring Rihanna and Bryson Tiller
- Drake, April 21, 2018: "God's Plan" replaced by "Nice for What"
- Drake, July 21, 2018: "Nice for What" replaced by "In My Feelings"
- Travis Scott, November 3, 2018: "Zeze" (Kodak Black featuring Travis Scott and Offset) replaced by "Sicko Mode"
- Post Malone, April 6, 2019: "Sunflower (Spider-Man: Into the Spider Verse)", with Swae Lee replaced by "Wow"
- Lizzo, November 23, 2019: "Truth Hurts" replaced by "Good as Hell"
- Tyler, the Creator, November 16, 2024: "St. Chroma" featuring Daniel Caesar replaced by "Sticky" featuring GloRilla, Sexyy Red and Lil Wayne
- Kendrick Lamar, December 14, 2024: "Squabble Up" replaced by "TV Off" featuring Lefty Gunplay
- Kendrick Lamar, December 21, 2024: "TV Off" featuring Lefty Gunplay replaced by "Luther", with SZA
- Kendrick Lamar, February 22, 2025: "Luther", with SZA replaced by "Not Like Us"
- Kendrick Lamar, March 1, 2025: "Not Like Us" replaced by "Luther", with SZA

== Bubbling Under R&B/Hip-Hop Songs ==
Bubbling Under R&B/Hip-Hop Songs was a chart composed of 25 positions that represented songs making progress to chart on the main R&B/Hip-Hop Songs chart. Many times, songs halted their progress at this chart and never debuted on the Hot R&B/Hip-Hop Songs chart. The Bubbling Under R&B/Hip-Hop Songs chart could have also been seen as a 25 position quasi-addendum to the chart, since the chart represented the 25 songs below position number 50 that had not previously appeared on the main chart.

== See also ==
- List of number-one rhythm and blues hits (United States)
- Rhythm and blues
- Hip-hop music
- Hot R&B/Hip-Hop Airplay
