= List of Unsung episodes =

The following is an episode list for Unsung, a TV One biography and documentary television series about R&B, soul, jazz, gospel, blues, rap and reggae recording artists from the 1960s to the early 2000s. As of January 2022, 170 episodes have aired across 15 seasons.

== List of episodes ==
=== Season 1 ===
Title	Original airdate	Short summary	Notable guest appearances	Notes
Episode 1 – "The Story of Phyllis Hyman"	November 30, 2008	Documenting the rise and tribulation of R&B/Jazz recording artist Phyllis Hyman.	Interviews with Onaje Allan Gumbs, Hiram Bullock, The Whispers, Regina Belle, Dyana Williams, Clifford Carter (as Cliff Carter), Richard Clay, Norman Connors, David Nathan, Patty Jackson, Mercedes Ellington, Kenny Gamble, Cassandra McShepard, Glenda Gracia, and Cynthia Biggs.	One of four episodes narrated by recording artist Al B. Sure!.
Episode 2 – "The Gospel Truth with The Clark Sisters"	December 1, 2008	Documenting the trials and careers of the Gospel group The Clark Sisters.	Interviews with Karen Clark Sheard, Twinkie Clark, Jacky Clark Chisholm, Dorinda Clark-Cole, Regina Belle, Marvin Winans, Andrae Russell, and Charles Blake.	One of four episodes narrated by recording artist Al B. Sure!.
Episode 3 – "The Story of Donny Hathaway"	December 2, 2008	Documenting the rise and tribulation of influential Soul songwriter, composer, and recording artist Donny Hathaway.	Interviews with Eric Mercury, Barabara Harris, The Whispers, Quincy Jones, Lalah Hathaway, Musiq, Harold Wheeler, Ric Powell, Glenn Watts, Mario Medious, Dyana Williams, David Nathan, Nadine McKinnor, and Jesse Jackson.	One of four episodes narrated by recording artist Al B. Sure!.
Episode 4 – "The DeBarge Family"	December 3, 2008	Documenting the careers tribulations of the family R&B group The DeBarge Family.	Interviews with Bunny DeBarge, Randy DeBarge, James DeBarge (of DeBarge), Kristinia DeBarge, Etterlene DeBarge, Iris Gordy, Jermaine Jackson, Babyface, Greg Williams (of Switch), Steve Barri, Eddie Lambert, David Nathan, and Dyana Williams.	One of four episodes narrated by recording artist Al B. Sure!.

=== Season 2 ===
Title	Original airdate	Short summary	Notable guest appearances	Notes
Episode 5 – "The Story of Minnie Riperton"	June 7, 2009	Documenting the rise and finite career of R&B recording artist Minnie Riperton.	Interviews with Dick Rudolph, Sidney Barnes (of Rotary Connection), Joe Sample, Maya Rudolph, Ramsey Lewis, Q-Tip (of A Tribe Called Quest), Dyana Williams, and A. Scott Galloway.	The first episode of series regular narrator Gary Anthony Williams.
Episode 6 – "The Story of Melba Moore"	June 14, 2009	Documenting the rise and career of recording artist and actress Melba Moore.	Interviews with Melba Moore, Nick Ashford, Valerie Simpson, Ben Vereen, Clifton Davis, Paul Laurence, Meli'sa Morgan, Alan Palanker, Dyana Williams, and Bill Cosby.	
Episode 7 – "The Story of Shalamar"	June 21, 2009	Documenting the rise and turbulent career of R&B group Shalamar.	Interviews with Micki Free, Jody Watley, Howard Hewett, Jeffrey Daniel, D'lisa Davis, Sydney Justin (of Shalamar), Dick Griffey, Karolyn Ali, and Leon Sylvers III.	Group member Jody Watley has been negatively critical of the portrayal of the group's tensions in this episode.
Episode 8 – "The Story of Florence Ballard"	June 28, 2009	Documenting the rise and tribulation of R&B recording artist Florence Ballard.	Interviews with Nelson George, Otis Williams (of The Temptations), Mary Wilson (of The Supremes), Dyana Williams, Peter Benjaminson, and Janie Bradford.	Florence Ballard was an original member of the Motown group The Supremes. The character Effie White from the musical Dreamgirls is loosely based on Ballard. Florence Ballard was previously featured on an episode of Mysteries and Scandals in 1999.
Episode 9 – "The Story of Teena Marie"	November 1, 2009	Documenting the rise and career of recording artist Teena Marie.	Interviews with Teena Marie, Smokey Robinson, Nelson George, Berry Gordy, George Duke, Faith Evans, Yvette Barlowe (of The Mary Jane Girls), Iris Gordy, Benny Medina and Kerry Gordy (of Apollo), Dick Rudolph, Allen McGrier, Daniel Lemelle, Larkin Arnold, Dyana Williams, and Maxine Waters.	One of the last interviews Teena Marie made. She died December 26, 2010.
Episode 10 – "The Story of Bootsy Collins"	November 8, 2009	Documenting the rise and career of Funk superstar Bootsy Collins.	Interviews with Bootsy Collins, George Clinton, Bernie Worrell, Mallia Franklin (of Parliament-Funkadelic), Frank "Kash" Waddy (of The Pacemakers), Lady Miss Kier (of Deee-Lite), Snoop Dogg, Larry Nager, and Mark Mallory.	
Episode 11 – "The Story of Klymaxx"	November 15, 2009	Documenting the rise and careers of all-female R&B/Pop band Klymaxx.	Interviews with Bernadette Cooper, Cheryle Cooley, Robin Gridder, Lynn Malsby, Joyce Irby, Lorena Stewart, Jimmy Jam and Terry Lewis, and Dyana Williams.	
Episode 12 – "The Story of Zapp & Roger"	November 22, 2009	Documenting the rise and tribulation of influential Funk band Zapp and leading recording artist Roger Troutman.	Interviews with Terry Troutman, Lester Troutman, Gregory Jackson, Ricardo Brey, Dale DeGroat (of Zapp & Roger), Big Robb, Mark "Drac" Hicks (of Slave), Nelson George, Barry Benson, Shirley Murdock, Tech N9ne, DJ Quik, and Snoop Dogg.	

=== Season 3 ===
Title	Original airdate	Short summary	Notable guest appearances	Notes
Episode 13 – "The Story of Rose Royce"	March 22, 2010	Documenting the rise and career of the R&B group Rose Royce.	Interviews with Kenny Copeland, Gwen Dickey, Lequeint "Duke" Jobe, and Joe Harris (of The Undisputed Truth).	
Episode 14 – "The Story of Sylvester"	March 29, 2010	Documenting the rise and short-lived career of Disco recording artist Sylvester.	Interviews with Joshua Gamson, Anita Pointer (of The Pointer Sisters), Walter Hawkins, Martha Wash, Jeanie Tracy, Dyana Williams, and Narada Michael Walden.	
Episode 15 – "Unsung Uncut"	April 5, 2010	Features full-length performances from the artists featured on the series.	Performances of Teena Marie w/ Rick James ("Sucka For Your Love"), Bootsy Collins ("Ain't It Funky Now"), Klymaxx ("Meeting In the Ladies Room"), Rose Royce ("Car Wash"), Debarge ("I Like It"), Minnie Riperton ("Lovin' You"), and Sylvester ("Dance").	
Episode 16 – "The Story of Stacy Lattisaw"	April 12, 2010	Documenting the rise and career of R&B vocalist Stacy Lattisaw.	Interviews with Stacy Lattisaw, Johnny Gill (of New Edition), and Narada Michael Walden.	
Episode 17 – "The Story of The Bar-Kays"	April 19, 2010	Documenting the rise and tribulation of Funk band The Bar-Kays.	Interviews with Ben Cauley, David Porter, James Alexander, Al Bell, Jazze Pha, and Steven Ivory.	This episode shows news footage from the plane crash that took the lives of singer Otis Redding and many of the original members, as well as footage of the Bar-Kays performing at Wattstax.
Episode 18 – "The Story of Teddy Pendergrass"	September 13, 2010	Documenting the rise and turbulent career of R&B vocalist Teddy Pendergrass.	Interviews with Tyrese Gibson, Dyana Williams, Kenny Gamble, and Leon Huff.	Teddy Pendergrass was previously featured on an episode of VH1's Behind the Music in 1997.
Episode 19 – "The Story of Tammi Terrell"	September 20, 2010	Documenting the rise and short-lived career of Motown vocalist Tammi Terrell.	Interviews with Nick Ashford, Valerie Simpson, Otis Williams (of The Temptations), Mary Wilson, Gene Chandler, Vance Wilson, Weldon Arthur McDougal III, Jerry Blavat, Elaine Jesmer, Harry Weinger, and Dyana Williams.	
Episode 20 – "The Story of Heatwave"	September 27, 2010	Documenting the rise and turbulent careers of R&B group Heatwave.	Interviews with Keith Wilder, Ernest "Bilbo" Berger, Mario Mantese, Billy Jones, Keith Harrison, Byron Byrd, Roy Carter, Derek Bramble (of Heatwave), Dyana Williams, and Dr. Scot Brown.	
Episode 21 – "The Story of Musical Youth"	October 4, 2010	Documenting the rise and turbulent careers of Reggae band Musical Youth.	Interviews with Dennis Seaton, Michael Grant, Kelvin Grant (of Musical Youth), Dave Morgan, Pete Price, and Don Letts.	
Episode 22 – "The Story of George Clinton"	October 11, 2010	Documenting the rise and career of Funk superstar George Clinton.	Interviews with George Clinton, Grady Thomas, Rickey Vincent, Bootsy Collins, Michael Hampton, Maceo Parker, Hank Shocklee, Robert 'Peanut' Johnson, Amuka/ Sheila Brody, and DeWayne McKnight (as Blackbyrd McNight).	George Clinton was previously featured on an episode of VH1's Legends in 1999.
Episode 23 – "The Story of The Fat Boys"	October 18, 2010	Documenting the rise and careers of pioneering rap group The Fat Boys.	Interviews with Prince Markie Dee, Damon Wimbley (of The Fat Boys), Papa Keith, Chuck Creekmur, Rayzor, Kurtis Blow, Charles Stettler, Biz Markie, Hank Shocklee, J. Cole, and Cory Rooney.	This was the first Unsung about a Hip Hop artist or group.
Episode 24 – "The Story of Angela Winbush"	October 25, 2010	Documenting the rise and turbulent career of R&B vocalist Angela Winbush.	Interviews with Angela Winbush, Lalah Hathaway, Avant, Tom Joyner, and A. Scott Galloway.	
Episode 25 – "The Story of Miki Howard"	November 1, 2010	Documenting the rise and turbulent career of R&B/ Jazz vocalist Miki Howard.	Interviews with Miki Howard, Augie Johnson (of Side Effect), John Nettlesbey, LeMel Humes, Robi Reed, and Val Young.	
Episode 26 – "The Story of The O'Jays"	November 8, 2010	Documenting the rise and turbulent careers of legendary R&B group The O'Jays.	Interviews with Eddie Levert, Bobby Massey, Sammy Strain (also of Little Anthony and the Imperials) (of The O'Jays), Marc Gordon (of LeVert), and Tom Joyner.	

=== Season 4 ===
Title	Original airdate	Short summary	Notable guest appearances	Notes
Episode 27 – "The Story of Deniece Williams"	June 6, 2011	Documenting the rise and career of recording artist Deniece Williams.	Interviews with Deniece Williams, Stevie Wonder, Johnny Mathis, George Duke, Verdine White & Philip Bailey (of Earth, Wind, & Fire), Ray Parker Jr., and Tatyana Ali.	This was the first episode to feature Pop-Up Video style information boxes and trivia during the show.
Episode 28 – "The Story of The Spinners"	June 13, 2011	Documenting the rise and career of R&B group The Spinners.	Interviews with Henry Fambrough, Bobby Smith, G. C. Cameron, John Edwards, Charlton Washington, and Jessie Peck (of The Spinners), Thom Bell, Dyana Williams, and Jerry L. Greenberg.	The episode features footage from the film Soul Power (2008), which documented the concert in Zaire, Africa which complemented the Muhammad Ali/ George Foreman fight dubbed "Rumble in the Jungle". The Spinners performed with James Brown, Celia Cruz and the Fania All-Stars, B.B. King, Miriam Makeba, Bill Withers, and Manu Dibango.
Episode 29 – "The Story of Alexander O'Neal and Cherrelle"	June 20, 2011	Documenting the rise and careers of R&B vocalists Alexander O'Neal and Cherrelle.	Interviews with Alexander O'Neal, Cherrelle, Miki Howard, Jimmy Jam and Terry Lewis, and Pebbles.	
Episode 30 – "The Story of Big Daddy Kane"	June 27, 2011	Documenting the rise and career of rapper and actor Big Daddy Kane.	Interviews with Big Daddy Kane, Nelson George, MC Lyte, Biz Markie, Scoob Lover, Tyrone "Fly Ty" Williams, Mister Cee, Matthew McDaniel, Freddie Foxxx, Kool Moe Dee, Eric B. (of Eric B. & Rakim), Ralph McDaniels, and Roxanne Shanté.	
Episode 31 – "The Story of The Ohio Players"	July 4, 2011	Documenting the rise and career of R&B group The Ohio Players.	Interviews with Leroy "Sugarfoot" Bonner, Marshall "Rock" Jones, Greg Webster, James "Diamond" Williams, and Walter Morrison, Billy Beck and Trae Pierce (of the Ohio Players), Bootsy Collins, Lester Troutman (of Zapp), Scot Brown, Pat "Runningbear" Evans, and Robin McBride.	The Ohio Players previously discussed the urban legends surrounding the track "Love Rollercoaster" and the cover art to Honey, in an episode of the series VH1 Confidential.
Episode 32 – "The Story of Evelyn Champagne King"	July 11, 2011	Documenting the rise and career of Disco and R&B vocalist Evelyn Champagne King.	Interviews with Evelyn Champagne King, Leon Sylvers III (of The Sylvers), Kenny Copeland (of Rose Royce), Kashif, Flo Jenkins, Dyana Williams.	
Episode 33 – "The Story of Billy Preston"	July 25, 2011	Documenting the rise and career of recording artist Billy Preston.	Interviews with Merry Clayton, Bruce Fisher, and George Johnson (of The Brothers Johnson).	
Episode 34 – "The Story of The Sylvers"	August 1, 2011	Documenting the rise and turbulent careers of the family R&B group The Sylvers.	Interviews with Nelson George, Leon Sylvers III, other members of the Sylvers family, and Dyana Williams.	
Episode 35 – "The Story of Mary Wells"	August 15, 2011	Documenting the rise and turbulent career of Motown R&B vocalist Mary Wells.	Interviews with Brenda Holloway, Brian Holland and Eddie Holland, Mary Wilson (of The Supremes), Claudette Rogers Robinson, Meech Wells, Mizell Brothers, Peter Benjaminson, Mickey Gentile, Nelson George, and Janie Bradford.	
Episode 36 – "The Story of Vesta Williams"	January 2, 2012	Documenting the rise and turbulent career of R&B recording artist and actress Vesta Williams.	Interviews with Vesta Williams, Howard Hewett (of Shalamar), "Bow-Legged Lou" (of Full Force), TC Campbell (of Cameo), Will Downing, and Vivica A. Fox.	The last interview Vesta Williams conducted. She died September 22, 2011. This was the first episode to feature a newly designed opening sequence.
Episode 37 – "The Story of Bobby Womack"	January 9, 2012	Documenting the rise and turbulent career of R&B, Soul singer & songwriter Bobby Womack.	Interviews with Bobby Womack, Bill Withers, David T. Walker, Harold Payne, Steven Ivory, and Michael Thompson.	
Episode 38 – "The Story of Atlantic Starr"	January 16, 2012	Documenting the rise and careers of the R&B music group Atlantic Starr.	Interviews with David Lewis, Sharon Bryant, Barbara Weathers, Steven Ivory, Cliff Winston, and Adrienne-Joi Johnson.	
Episode 39 – "The Story of Freddie Jackson"	January 23, 2012	Documenting the rise and career of R&B vocalist Freddie Jackson.	Interviews with Freddie Jackson, Melba Moore, Meli'sa Morgan, Howard Hewett (of Shalamar), Steven Ivory, and Chuck Jackson.	
Episode 40 – "The Story of Full Force"	January 30, 2012	Documenting the rise and careers of R&B group Full Force.	Interviews with Lisa Lisa (of Lisa Lisa and Cult Jam), Cheryl Pepsii Riley, Howie Dorough (of The Backstreet Boys), Christopher Reid (of Kid 'n Play), Don Cornelius, "Grouchy" Greg Watkins (of AllHipHop.com), and Blair Underwood.	This was the last TV appearance of Don Cornelius. He committed suicide two days after this episode aired.
Episode 41 – "The Story of Millie Jackson"	February 6, 2012	Documenting the rise and career of R&B vocalist and comedian Millie Jackson.	Interviews with Millie Jackson, Keisha Jackson, Roxanne Shante, Da Brat, Latimore, A. Scott Galloway, and Nelson George.	
Episode 42 – "The Story of Ray Parker Jr."	February 13, 2012	Documenting the rise and career of R&B singer/ songwriter Ray Parker Jr.	Interviews with Ray Parker Jr., David Foster, Chaka Khan, Clive Davis, Arnell Carmichael (of Raydio), Vincent Bonham (of Raydio), Deniece Williams, Cheryl Lynn, Eddie Holland, Steve Jordan, Chazzy Green, and David Paich.	

=== Season 5 ===
Title	Original airdate	Short summary	Notable guest appearances	Notes
Episode 43 – ""The Story of Sheila E. (and the Family)"	February 27, 2012	Documenting the rise and career of drummer and percussionist Sheila E.	Interviews with Sheila E., Pete Escovedo, Juan Escovedo, Peter Michael Escovedo, Zina Escovedo, M.C. Hammer, Karl Perazzo, George Duke, Al Jarreau, Michael Cooper (of Con Funk Shun), Cliff Winston, Ray Obiedo, and D'wayne Wiggins.	Postponed from an earlier date (February 20, 2012)
Episode 44 – "The Story of David Ruffin"	March 5, 2012	Documenting the rise and turbulent career of R&B performer David Ruffin.	Interviews with Otis Williams, Dennis Edwards (of The Temptations), Cornelius Grant, Clay McMurray, Robert Penn, Shelly Berger, and Larry Buford.	Postponed from an earlier date (February 27, 2012). David Ruffin was a pivotal member of the Motown group "The Temptations. This was the highest rated episode of the season.
Episode 45 – "The Story of Whodini"	March 12, 2012	Documenting the rise and career of pioneering rap group Whodini.	Interviews with Hassan Pore, Jalil Hutchins, Ralph McDaniels, John Fletcher, Grandmaster Dee, Kangol Kid, Roy Comier, Stretch, Michael Bivins, Chuck D, Dana Dane, Doctor Ice, and Nelson George.	Postponed from an earlier date (March 5, 2012)
Episode 46 – "The Story of Sly and the Family Stone	June 25, 2012	Documenting the rise and turbulent careers of music group Sly and the Family Stone.	Interviews with Sly Stone, Cynthia Robinson, Greg Errico, Jerry Martini (of Sly and the Family Stone), Stephen Paley, Novena Carmel, Clive Davis, Hamp "Bubba" Banks, and Jeff Kaliss.	Original bassist Larry Graham did not appear in the documentary.
Episode 47 – "The Story of Angela Bofill"	July 2, 2012	Documenting the career and troubles of Jazz/R&B singer-songwriter Angela Bofill.	Interviews with Angela Bofill, Buddy Williams, Dave Valentin, Frank Martin, Narada Michael Walden, Maysa Leak, Jeanie Tracy, Francisco Coteno, Melba Moore, and Rich Engel.	
Episode 48 – "The Story of Con Funk Shun"	July 9, 2012	Documenting the rise and careers of the R&B/funk music group Con Funk Shun.	Interviews with Dennis Johnson, Danny "Sweetman" Thomas, Felton Pilate, Larry Dodson (of The Bar Kays), Michael Cooper, Zebulun Pauelle Harrell, Karl Fuller, Paul Mack, Peter Michael Escovedo, Cedric Martin, Rickey Vincent, Linda Lou McCall, Jay King, Melvin Carter, and MC Hammer.	
Episode 49 – "The Story of Kool Moe Dee"	July 16, 2012	Documenting the rise and career of pioneer rap vocalist Kool Moe Dee.	Interviews with Kool Moe Dee, LA Sunshine, Special K (of the Treacherous Three), Busy Bee Starski, Melle Mel, Doug E. Fresh, Teddy Riley, Quincy Jones, and Lavaba Mallison.	
Episode 50 – "The Story of The Marvelettes"	July 23, 2012	Documenting the rise and turbulent decline of Motown group the Marvelettes.	Interviews with Katherine Anderson Shaffner, Wanda Young Rogers, Ann Bogan, Wyanetta "Juanita" Cowart (of the Marvelettes), Otis Williams (of The Temptations), Georgia Dobbins, Robert Bateman, Mary Wilson (of The Supremes), Joe Billingslea (of The Contours), Eddie Holland, Dyana Williams, Janie Bradford, and David Washington.	
Episode 51 – "The Story of Arrested Development"	August 13, 2012	Documenting the careers of alternative hip hop group Arrested Development.	Interviews with Speech, Rasa Don, Aerle Taree, One Love, Eshe Mothsho, Dionne Farris, JJ Boogie, Tasha LaRae (of Arrested Development), Michael Mauldin, Steven Ivory, Jason Orr, Gil Robertson IV, and Kelley L. Carter.	

=== Season 6 ===
Title	Original airdate	Short summary	Notable guest appearances	Notes
Episode 52 – "The Story of Gerald Levert"	August 20, 2012	Documenting the rise and career of R&B vocalist Gerald Levert.	Interviews with Eric Nolan Grant, Eddie Levert, Walter Williams (of The O'Jays), Marc Gordon (of LeVert), Johnny Gill (of LSG), Reggie Calloway, Vincent Calloway (of Calloway and Midnight Star), Miki Howard, Michael Ferguson, Sylvia Rhone, Edwin "Tony" Nicholas, Steven Ivory, Steve Harvey, and Dyana Williams.	Postponed from an earlier date: (July 30, 2012).
Episode 53 – "The Story of Isaac Hayes"	January 23, 2013	Documenting the rise and career of R&B vocalist and actor Isaac Hayes.	Interviews with David Porter, Rickey Vincent, James Alexander (of The Bar Kays), Al Bell, Willie Hall, Pat Lewis, and Mack Rice.	Footage from the documentary concert film Wattstax (1973) was incorporated into this episode.
Episode 54 – "The Story of Midnight Star"	January 30, 2013	Documenting the rise and career of the R&B and electro-funk group Midnight Star	Interviews with Vincent Calloway, Reggie Calloway (also of Calloway) Kenneth Gant, Bill Simmons, Jeffrey Cooper, Melvin Gentry, Bo Watson, Belinda Lipscomb (of Midnight Star), Scot Brown, Steve Ivory, Bobby Lovelace, Karolyn Ali, Walter Scott and Wallace Scott (of The Whispers), Virgil Roberts, Ecstacy (of Whodini), Tyrone DuBose, and Phyllis Larrymore-Kelly.	
Episode 55- "The Story of EPMD"	February 6, 2013	Documenting the rise and turbulent career of hip-hop group EPMD	Interviews with Erick Sermon, Parrish Smith, DJ Scratch (of EPMD) Charlie Marotta, DMC aka Darryl McDaniels (of Run DMC), Redman, Keith Murray, Skoob (of Das EFX), Hurricane GKim Sermon (rapper), Tomara Rukwira, Belinda Sermon, Bernard Alexander, Richard and Raymond Grant (DJ Twinz), Nelson George, and Chuck Creekmur (of AllHipHop.com).	
Episode 56 – "The Story of Lou Rawls"	February 13, 2013	Documenting the rise and career of R&B vocalist and philanthropist Lou Rawls	Interviews with H.B. Barnum, Louanna Rawls, Billy Vera, Les McCann, Della Reese, Reg Johnson, Rickey Minor, Steve Ivory, Leon Huff, and Kenny Gamble.	Postponed from an earlier date (August 20, 2012).
Episode 57 – "The Story of Disco"	February 20, 2013	A two-hour special documenting the rise and fall of the American phenomenon that took the world by storm in the 1970s.	Interviews with Phil Hurtt, Patrick Adams, Ernie Singleton, Kenton Nix, Nicky Siano, Candi Staton, Gloria Gaynor, Nile Rodgers (of Chic), Harry Wayne Casey (of KC & The Sunshine Band), Anita Ward, Thelma Houston, Victor Willis, David Hodo (of The Village People), Vince Aletti, Frankie Knuckles, Earl Young (of The Trammps), Janice-Marie Johnson (of A Taste of Honey), Fred Buggs, Cecil Holmes, Billy Amato, Taana Gardner, Wonder Mike (of The Sugarhill Gang), Michael Eric Dyson, and Nelson George	This episode was the first to focus on an entire genre of music rather than a particular artist, group, or band.
Episode 58 – "The Story of Eddie Kendricks"	February 27, 2013	Documenting the rise and career of R&B performer Eddie Kendricks	Interviews with Otis Williams, Dennis Edwards (of The Temptations), Mary Wilson, Prentiss Anderson, David Washington, Shelly Berger, Martha Reeves, Rickey Vincent, Darleen Woods, Merald "Bubba" Knight (of Gladys Knight & the Pips), and David Sea.	Eddie Kendricks was a co-founder of the Motown group The Temptations.
Episode 59 – "The Story of The Whispers"	March 6, 2013	Documenting the rise and career of R&B group The Whispers	Interviews with Walter Scott, Wallace Scott, Nicholas Caldwell, Leveil Degree (of The Whispers), George Aubrey, Willette Ballard, Leon Sylvers III, Kenneth "Babyface" Edmonds, Howard Hewett, Mo'Nique, Gary Taylor, Steve Ivory, Calvin Lincoln	The Whispers performed the opening theme for Soul Train during the 1980–1982 season.
Episode 60 – "The Story of Mint Condition"	March 13, 2013	Documenting the rise and career of R&B band Mint Condition	Interviews with Stokley Williams, Ricky Kinchen, Homer O'Dell, Larry Waddell, Jeffrey Allen, Keri Lewis (of Mint Condition), Mahmoud El Kati, Jimmy Jam and Terry Lewis, Brother Ali, Kelly Price, James "Popeye" Greer, Jellybean Johnson, Larkin Arnold, Peter Rhodes, and Michael Eric Dyson.	This was the highest rated episode of the season.
Episode 61 – "The Story of Johnny Gill"	March 20, 2013	Documenting the rise and career of the R&B singer-songwriter Johnny Gill	Interviews with Johnny Gill, Stacy Lattisaw, Hank Caldwell, Keith Sweat (also of LSG), Randy Gill, Babyface, Michael Bivins, Ralph Tresvant, Bobby Brown (also of New Edition), Tray Taylor, Cathy Hughes, Barry Bonds, Sugar Ray Leonard, Arsenio Hall, Michael Baisden, and Monica Palmer.	This was the second highest rated episode of the season, behind Mint Condition.
Episode 62 – "The Story of Heavy D & The Boyz"	October 30, 2013	Documenting the careers and tribulations of new jack swing pioneers Heavy D & The Boyz and rapper Heavy D.	Interviews with Glen Parrish (G-Whiz), Eddie F (of Heavy D & The Boyz), Andre Harrell, DJ Red Alert, Teddy Riley, Reginald Hudlin, Pete Rock (of Pete Rock & CL Smooth), Leslie "Big Lez" Segar, Sandra Denton (of Salt-n-Pepa), Jeff Christie, and Monifah Carter	Heavy D provided the opening lyrics for Fox's In Living Color.
Episode 63 – "The Story of Lisa Lisa & Cult Jam"	November 6, 2013	Documenting the careers of R&B pop group Lisa Lisa & Cult Jam.	Interviews with Lisa Lisa, Mike Hughes, Alex Mosley (of Lisa Lisa & Cult Jam), Brian "B-Fine" George, Paul Anthony, "Bow-Legged Lou" (of Full Force), Angie Martinez, Kangol Kid, Downtown Julie Brown, Mimi Valdez, Kimberly Osorio, Michael Bivins (of New Edition), Toni Menage, Stephanie Saraco, Cindi Gomes, and Christina Vidal.	
Episode 64 – "The Story of The Geto Boys"	November 13, 2013	Documenting the careers and tribulations of the pioneering Southern hip hop group The Geto Boys.	Interviews with Bun B, Prince Johnny C, Bushwick Bill, Scarface, Willie D, DJ Ready Red (of The Geto Boys), Soren Baker, Big Boy, The Poetess, Greg Mack, Gangsta Boo, and T.I.	
Episode 65 – "The Story of The Delfonics"	November 20, 2013	Documenting the career of 1960s & 1970s R&B group The Delfonics.	Interviews with Wilson Hart, William Hart, Wilbert Hart, Sonny Hopson, Kenny Gamble, Thom Bell, Tony Brown, Jerry Blavat, Nelson George, Dyana Williams, Adrian Younge, Earl Young, and Linda Lou McCall.	
Episode 66 – "The Story of Too $hort"	January 29, 2014	Documenting the career and tribulations of rapper Too $hort.	Interviews with Too $hort, Kenny Red, Too Clean, Freddy B, Money-B (of Digital Underground), Richie Rich, Davey D, Carla Green (of The Conscious Daughters), Jerry Hodges, Dean Hodges, Snoop Lion, The Poetess, Lionel Bea, Lil Jon, Mark Curry, Yo-Yo, Monica Payne (of Terri & Monica), Allen Gordon, and Yukmouth (of The Luniz)	Postponed to January 1, 2014.
Episode 67 – "The Story of CeCe Peniston"	November 27, 2013	Documenting the career of R&B vocalist CeCe Peniston.	Interviews with CeCe Peniston, Barbara Peniston, Greg Peniston, Felipe Delgado, Tonya Davis (as Tonya "Peach" Davis), Rodney K. Jackson (as R.K. Jackson), Manny Lehman, Iris Perkins, Steve "Silk" Hurley, Tyrone Dubose, Malaika LeRae Sallard (as Malaika LeRae), Damon Jones, Adina Howard, Lois Walden (of Sisters of Glory), Mark Edward Nero	

=== Season 7 ===
Title	Original airdate	Short summary	Notable guest appearances	Notes
Episode 68 – "The Story of The Manhattans"	February 5, 2014	Documenting the careers of R&B group The Manhattans.	Interviews with Philip Terrell Flood, Gerald Alston, Kenneth Kelly, Winfred Lovett, Gregory Gaskins (of The Manhattans), Fred Huneley, Tyrone Dubose, Eddie Levert, Steven Ivory, Regina Belle, Paris Eley, Rodgers Redding, and David Tyson	
Episode 69 – "The Story of Gil Scott Heron"	February 12, 2014	Documenting the career of recording artist and Spoken Word poet Gil Scott Heron.	Interviews with Eddie "Ade" Knowles, Brian Jackson, Danny Bowens, Tony Green, Charles Saunders, DJ Kemit, V Dixon, Snoop Dogg, Charlotte Fox, Larry MacDonald, Tony Duncanson, Rickey Vincent, W Shabazz, Malcolm Cecil, Robert Gordon, Clive Davis, Kim Jordan, Talib Kweli, M-1, and Mimi	
Episode 70 – "The Story of Nile Rodgers and Chic"	February 19, 2014	Documenting the careers of Funk & Disco pioneers Nile Rodgers and Chic.	Interviews with Nile Rodgers, Norma Jean Wright, Alfa Anderson, Sylver Logan Sharp (of Chic), Focus... (as Bernard Edwards Jr.), Bob Clearmountain, Fonzi Thornton, Robert Drake, Steve Ivory, Jerry Greenberg, Bunchy Goodman, Kathy Sledge (of Sister Sledge), Nelson George, Sammy Figueroa, and Budd Taneck.	
Episode 71 – "The Story of Montell Jordan"	July 30, 2014	Documenting the rise and tribulation of R&B recording artist Montell Jordan.	Interviews with Montell Jordan, Steve Ivory, Paul Stewart, Thomas Cunningham, Tina Davis, Gerrick Kennedy, Kevin Liles, Anthony Crawford (as Anthony "Shep" Crawford), LaRonda Sutton.	
Episode 72 – "The Story of Hi-Five"	August 6, 2014	Documenting the trials and tribulations of R&B group Hi-Five.	Interviews with Toriano Easley, Russell Neal, Marcus Sanders, Treston Irby, Terrence Murphy, Shannon Gill (of Hi-Five), Vincent E. Bell, Steve Russell, and Tyrone Dubose, Flex Alexander, Jonathan Kinloch, Lionel Martin, Kimmy Mason, Gerrick Kennedy	Ex-group member Russell Neal murdered his wife a month before the airing of this episode.
Episode 73 – "The Story of The Emotions"	August 13, 2014	Documenting the trials and tribulations of female R&B group The Emotions.	Interviews with Sheila Hutchinson, Pam Hutchinson, Wanda Hutchinson, Theresa Davis (of The Emotions), Clarence McDonald, Steve Ivory, Marshall Thompson (of the Chi-lites), Ron Ellison, Shanice Wilson, Keith Henderson, Al McKay (as Al McCay), Ricky Lawson, Deneice Williams, Allee Willis, and Larry Heimgarter.	
Episode 74 – "The Story of Martha Wash"	August 20, 2014	Documenting the career of R&B recording artist Martha Wash.	Interviews with Martha Wash, Charlene Moore, Jeanie Tracy, RuPaul, Eric Beall, Kenny Ortiz, Tyrone Dubose, Paul Shaffer, Robert Clivilles, Freedom Williams (of C+C Music Factory), Brian Alexander Morgan, James Washington, Zach Adam	
Episode 75 – "The Story of Troop"	August 27, 2014	Documenting the rise and career of R&B group Troop.	Interviews with Steven Russell Harts, Rodney Benford, Reginald Warren, Allen McNeil, John Harreld (of Troop), Bobby Brown, Marc Gordon (of LeVert), Steve Ivory, Chuckii Booker, Jai Jackson, Arsenio Hall, Doc Clark, Flex Alexander, Joyce Irby (of Klymaxx), Louis Burrell, Zac Harmon, Bobby Robinson, Demetrius 'Meech' Shipp, Stone Paxton	
Episode 76 – "The Story of Bone Thugs-n-Harmony"	September 3, 2014	Documenting the rise and tribulations of Hip Hop group Bone Thugs-n-Harmony.	Interviews with Flesh-N-Bone, Wish Bone, Bizzy Bone, Layzie Bone, Krayzie Bone (of Bone Thugs-n-Harmony), Big Boy, Steve Lobel, Kenny McCloud, DJ Yella, DJ Quik, DJ U-Neek, Cipha Sounds, Tomica Woods-Wright, Craig Henry, Soren Baker, Machine Gun Kelly, Violet Brown, Jamie Adler	
Episode 77 – "The Story of Wilson Pickett"	September 10, 2014	Documenting the career of R&B recording artist Wilson Pickett.	Interviews with Willie Schofeld (of The Falcons), Rickey Vincent, Dave Washington, Curtis Pope, Wayne Cochran, Dennis Coffey, Chris Tuthill, Bobby Womack, Mario Medious, Jerry Jemmott, Wayne Cobham.	Featured footage from the documentary concert film Soul to Soul.
Episode 78 – "The Story of The Chi-Lites"	September 17, 2014	Documenting the rise and tribulations of R&B group The Chi-Lites.	Interviews with Marshall Thompson, Frank Reed (of The Chi-Lites), Gregg Parker, Dave Washington, Bruce Swedien, Tyrone Dubose, Tom Tom Washington, Gus Redmond, and Herb Kent.	
Episode 79 – "The Story of Rick James"	January 14, 2015	Documenting the rise, career, and turbulent life of funk pioneer Rick James.	Interviews with Nate & Lanise Hughes, Levi Ruffin, Daniel LeMelle, Oscar Alston, Tom McDermott (of the Stone City Band), Kerry Gordy, Jeff Jampol, Smokey Robinson, Narada Michael Walden, Val Young, Charlie Murphy, Jazze Pha, Roxanne Shante.	Postponed from an earlier date (October 1, 2014). Rick James was previously featured on an episode of VH1's Behind the Music in 1998.
Episode 80 – "The Story of Peaches and Herb"	January 21, 2015	Documenting the rise and tribulations of R&B group Peaches and Herb.	Interviews with Herb Fame, Dewey Hughes, Steve Ivory, Paul Cohn, Linda Tavani, Peter Manning Robinson, Stephen Tavani.	Postponed from an earlier date (September 24, 2014).
Episode 81 – "The Story of Angie Stone"	January 28, 2015	Documenting the rise and tribulations of R&B and Soul vocalist Angie Stone.	Interviews with Angie Stone, Gwendolyn Chisolm (of The Sequence), Nautica De La Cruz, Rodney C. Stone (of Funky Four Plus One), Willie Bruno, Jocelyn Cooper, Kedar Massenburg, Syleena Johnson, Peter Edge, Clive Davis, and Jazze Pha.	
Episode 82 – "The Story of Meli'sa Morgan"	February 4, 2015	Documenting the rise and tribulations of R&B vocalist Meli'sa Morgan.	Interviews with Meli'sa Morgan, Paul Laurence, Patrick Adams, Kashif, Don Grierson, Miki Howard, Melba Moore, Bow-legged Lou (of Full Force), Alyson Williams, Fred "Bugsy" Buggs, Kevin Harewood, Lesette Wilson, Lenny Green, Ruben Rodriguez, Tyrone Dubose.	

=== Season 8 ===
Title	Original airdate	Short summary	Notable guest appearances	Notes
Episode 83 – "The Story of Ike Turner"	June 3, 2015	Documenting the trials and tribulations of rock and roll pioneer Ike Turner.	Interviews with Claudia Lennear, Linda Williams, Alesia Butler (of The Ikettes), Margena Christian, John Hornyak, Leon Blue, Sidney Miller, Holle Thee Maxwell (as Holle Maxwell), Dennis Rubenstein, Paul Smith, Bill Ray, and Kevin Cooper (of Kings of Rhythm).	
Episode 84 – "The Story of Otis Redding"	June 10, 2015	Documenting the trials and tribulations of Soul/R&B recording artist Otis Redding.	Interviews with Hamp Swain, Rob Bowman, David Porter, Steve Cropper (of Booker T. & the M.G.'s), James Alexander (of The Bar-Kays), Deanie Parker, Newt Collier, Alan Walden, Wayne Jackson, Floyd Newman (of The Memphis Horns), Earl "Speedo" Sims, and Anthony Hamilton.	
Episode 85 – "The Story of DJ Quik"	June 17, 2015	Documenting the rise and career of Hip Hop artist & record producer DJ Quik.	Interviews with DJ Quik, Hi-C, "Playa Hamm" & Tweed Cadillac (of Penthouse Players Clique), "Peter Gunz" (of Lord Tariq and Peter Gunz), Doctah B. Sirius, Cory Robbins, Billy Johnson Jr., Big Boy, Nautica de la Cruz, Fabian "Fade" Duvernay, Robert Bacon, Erick Sermon, Dr. Scot Brown, Mack 10, El DeBarge (of DeBarge), Donna Torrence, Suga Free, and Dom Kennedy.	
Episode 86 -"Chuck Brown and the Story of Go-Go"	June 24, 2015	Documenting the career, trials, and tribulations of funk pioneer Chuck Brown and the subgenre Go-Go he helped craft.	Interviews with John "J.B." Buchanan, Lloyd Pinchback, Donald Tillery (of The Soul Searchers), Marion Barry, Charles Stephenson, Nekos Brown, Wiley Brown, Chucky Thompson, Kip Lornell, Kevin Kato Hammond (as Kevin "Kato" Hammond), Vincent C. Gray, Konan (DJ), Big Tony Fisher (of Trouble Funk), Darryl Brooks, William "JuJu" House, Gregory "Sugar Bear" Elliot (of Experience Unlimited aka E.U.), Andre "Whiteboy" Johnson (of Rare Essence), Anwan Glover, Bo Sampson, Raheem DeVaughn, and Jill Scott.	This show features one of the last interviews with former DC Mayor Marion Barry.
Unsung Revisited"	July 1, 2015	In this unique episode, Unsung revisits four artists – Full Force, Miki Howard, Zapp and Roger, and Sylvester – to uncover how their lives have been affected by the award-winning series.	Interviews with Ricardo Rey, Snoop Dogg, Shirley Murdock, Lester Troutman, Dale DeGroat, Big Robb, B-Fine, Bow-legged Lou, Paul Anthony, Dyana Williams, Narada Michael Walden, Jeanie Tracy, Anthony Wayne, Kendrell Bowman, Sheryl Lee Ralph, Val Young, John Nettlesby, Miki Howard, and Brandon Howard.	
Episode 87 – "The Story of Xscape"	July 8, 2015	Documenting the careers of R&B girl group Xscape.	Interviews with LaTocha Scott, Tamika Scott, Kandi Burruss, Tamera Coggins-Wynn, Tameka Cottle (as "Tiny" Cottle-Harris) (of Xscape), Ian Burke, Jermaine Dupri, Kenyatta McDonald, Michael Mauldin, Rocky Bivens, Sonia Murray, Daryl Simmons, Manuel Seal, and T.I.	This was the highest rated episode of Unsung over the entire series and the highest rated show on TV One through July 2015. Group member Tameka Cottle has been negatively critical of the portrayal of the group's tensions in this episode.
Episode 88 – "The Story of Kid 'n Play"	July 15, 2015	Documenting the careers of Hip Hop duo and actors Kid 'n Play.	Interviews with Christopher Reid, Christopher Martin, Mark "DJ Wiz" Eastmond, Lenny Brown, Rich Ahee, Kwamé, Full Force, Martin Lawrence, Tisha Campbell, Havelock Nelson, Reginald Hudlin, Adrienne-Joi Johnson (as AJ Johnson), Fred Munao, and Bill Maher.	TV One previously aired episodes of Life After on Christopher Reid in 2009, and Christopher Martin in 2011.
Episode 89 – "The Story of Al B. Sure!"	August 26, 2015	Documenting the career of R&B recording artist and record producer Al B. Sure!.	Interviews with Al B. Sure!, Andre Harrell, Benny Medina, Kelly Price, Dyana Williams, Jojo Brim, Faith Evans, Brennan Williams, Rolanda Watts, Mike Tyson, Kim Porter, and DJ Eddie F.	Sure narrated the four episodes of pilots in Season 1.
Episode 90 – "The Story of Yarbrough & Peoples"	September 2, 2015	Documenting the career and trials of the R&B and Funk duo Yarbrough & Peoples.	Interviews with Alisa Peoples, Cavin Yarbrough, Robert "Goodie" Whitfield, Malvin Dino Vice, Raymond Calhoun, Oliver A. Scott (of The Gap Band), Tyrone DuBose, and Steve Ivory.	
Episode 91 – "The Story of Force MD's"	September 9, 2015	Documenting the trials and tribulations of Doowop/R&B group The Force MD's.	Interviews with Khalil Lundy, Steven Lundy, Trisco Pearson, Jessie Daniels (of the Force MD's), Tom Silverman, Monica Lynch, DJ Kev-Ski, Guy Route, Kevin Harewood, DJ Dr. Shock, and Bow-legged Lou (of Full Force).	
Episode 92 – "The Story of Yo-Yo"	September 16, 2015	Documenting the career of rapper & activist Yo-Yo.	Interviews with Yo-Yo, Sir Jinx, Candyman, Ice Cube, Billy Johnson, MC Lyte, Felicia "The Poetess" Morris, Big Boy, DJ Chilly Chill, Wesley Cullars, Maxine Waters, Claudio "Pockets" Robles, Adrian "AD" Scott, and Belinda Wilson.	
Episode 93 – "The Story of KC and The Sunshine Band"	October 7, 2015	Documenting the careers of 70's Funk & Disco band KC and the Sunshine Band.	Interviews with Harry Wayne Casey, Oliver C. Brown, Beverly Champion-Foster, Mike Lewis, Jeanette Wright, Fermin Goytisolo, Kenetha Morris (as Koko Morris) (of KC & the Sunshine Band), George McCrae, Steve Alaimo, Steve Ivory, and Nelson George.	
Episode 94 – "The Story of Kashif"	October 14, 2015	Documenting the career of R&B producer, singer, and songwriter Kashif.	Interviews with Kashif, Jamal Risbrook (of BT Express), Howard Johnson, Clive Davis, Bashiri Johnson, Tyrone DuBose, Meli'sa Morgan, Melba Moore, Tracey Ross, Howard Hewett (of Shalamar), Carl E. Douglas, and Myracle Holloway.	
Episode 95 – "The Story of Chanté Moore"	October 28, 2015	Documenting the issues and controversies of R&B/Jazz singer Chante Moore.	Interviews with Chante Moore, Fred Moultrie, Kevin Ross, Felipe Darrell, Laney Stewart, Keith Washington, Terry Ellis (of En Vogue), Simon Law, Ernie Singleton, Vassal Benford, Donnie Simpson, Kurupt, Von McAlpin, Kiki Shepard, Cheryl Cobb-DeBrosse, Jeff Sharp, Michael Mauldin, and Jamie Foster Brown.	Postponed from an earlier date (October 21, 2015).
Episode 96 – "The Story of Lakeside"	October 28, 2015	Documenting the rise, and turbulent careers of R&B/Funk band Lakeside.	Interviews with Thomas Shelby, Mark Wood, William Shelby, Stephen Shockley, Tiemeyer McCain, Rickey Abernathy, Otis Stokes, Fred Lewis, Fred Alexander, Norman Beavers, Johnny Rogers, Marvin Craig (of Lakeside), Carolyn Griffey, Marcus Chapman, Dr. Scot Brown, Leon Sylvers III (as Leon Sylvers), and Leanard Jackson.	
Episode 97 – "The Story of H-Town"	November 4, 2015	Documenting the trials and tribulations of R&B group H-Town.	Interviews with Solomon Conner (as Shazam), Daryl Jackson (as G.I.) (of H-Town), Bishop Burrell, Madd Hatta, Tammi Mac, Luther Campbell, Rob G, Alan Grunblatt, Baby Blue (of Pretty Ricky), and Divinci Rochon.	
Episode 98 – "The Story of Jennifer Holliday"	November 11, 2015	Documenting the rise and turbulent career of R&B/Gospel vocalist and actress Jennifer Holliday.	Interviews with Jennifer Holliday, V. Michael McKay, Yolanda Adams, Cleavant Derricks, Sheryl Lee Ralph, David E. Kelley, Allee Willis, Billy Meadows, David Mitchell, Edwin Hawkins, and Barry Eastmond.	
Episode 99 – "The Story of Nate Dogg"	November 18, 2015	Documenting the career of R&B singer Nate Dogg.	Interviews with Butch Cassidy, Snoop Dogg, Warren G, Fredwreck, Xzibit, Poetess, Spoon, Rod McGrew, Pharoahe Monch, Julio G, DJ Battlecat, Kurupt, and Jacob Lusk.	
Episode 100 – "The Top Ten That Changed the Game"	December 1, 2015	Hosted by Donnie Simpson. The episode featured a countdown of the top 10 most exceptional "Unsung" episodes – impacting profiles that were selected for their representation of the breadth and depth of the series through fan feedback, social engagement and their influence on pop culture.	Interviews with Unsung narrator Gary Anthony Williams, Finesse Mitchell, and Donnie Simpson.	
Episode 101 – "The Story of The Sugarhill Gang"	February 10, 2016	Documenting the trials and tribulations of Hip-Hop pioneers The Sugarhill Gang.	Interviews with Master Gee, Wonder Mike, Grandmaster Caz, Lil' Rodney Cee (of Funky 4 + 1), Gwendolyn "Blondie" Chisolm (of The Sequence, and Nile Rodgers (of Chic).	
Episode 102 – "The Story of Patrice Rushen"	February 17, 2016	Documenting the career of American jazz pianist and R&B singer Patrice Rushen.	Interviews with Patrice Rushen, Smokey Robinson, Terri Lyne Carrington, and Steven Ivory.	
Episode 103 – "The Story of Donell Jones"	February 24, 2016	Documenting the trials and tribulations of R&B artist Donell Jones.	Interviews with Donell Jones, Bryan-Michael Cox, Case, Quinnes Parker and Michael Keith (of 112), Shanti Das, Darren Lighty, and Jojo Brim.	
Episode 104 – "The Story of Johnnie Taylor"	March 2, 2016	Documenting the trials and tribulations of versatile recording artist Johnnie Taylor.	Interviews with Al Bell, Dave Washington, Gregg Smith, Alan Walden, Rodgers Redding, Laura Lee, Millie Jackson, Marcus Chapman, Harvey Scales, Candi Staton, Bettye Crutcher, Bernard Jenkins, T.J. Hooker-Taylor (as T.J. Hooker) and L.C. Cooke.	

=== Season 9 ===
Title	Original airdate	Short summary	Notable guest appearances	Notes
Episode 105 – "The Story of Kelly Price"	June 1, 2016	Documenting the trials and tribulations of R&B/Gospel recording artist Kelly Price.	Interviews with Kelly Price, Shep Crawford, Warryn Campbell, Faith Evans, Shirley Murdock, Donald Lawrence, Kenny Lattimore, Jeffery Rolle Jr., Stokley Williams (of Mint Condition), and Steven Ivory.	
Episode 106 – "The Story of Next"	June 8, 2016	Documenting the rise and ultimate breakup of R&B group Next.	Interviews with Terry "T-Low" Brown (as T-Low), Raphael "Tweet" Brown (as Tweet), RL, James Grear, Marlon "Shilo" Benjamin (of Strate4ward), Ann Nesby, Tony "Prof-T" Tolbert and Lance Alexander (of Lo-Key?), DJ Kay Gee (of Naughty by Nature), Nautica De La Cruz, DJ Kid Fresh, Maverick and J. Dante (of Ideal (group)).	
Episode 107 – "The Story of Kwamé"	June 15, 2016	Documenting the career of Hip-Hop recording artist/producer Kwamé.	Interviews with Kwamé, Chubb Rock, Dana Dane, DJ Tat Money, Derek Blanks, Vivian Green, Monie Love, Ed Lover, Christopher Reid (entertainer) and Christopher Martin (of Kid 'n Play), Taboo (of The Black Eyed Peas), Tasha Lambert-Mabry, and Tammi Mac.	
Episode 108 – "The Story of E-40"	June 22, 2016	Documenting the trials and tribulations of Hip-Hop recording artist E-40.	Interviews with E-40, B-Legit, D-Shot, Mugzi (of The Mossie), Suga-T, Too Short, Keak da Sneak, Mike Mosely, Barry Weiss, Russell Simmons, Droop-E, Davey D, Allen Gordon Jr., and Chuck Creekmur.	
Episode 109 – "The Story of Monifah"	August 17, 2016	Documenting the trials and tribulations of recording artist Monifah.	Interviews with Monifah, Free Marie (as Marie 'Free' Wright), Damian Blyden, Ulysses Carter, Duvonne Robinson, Anthony Giles, Tony Dofat, and Syleena Johnson.	
Episode 110 – "The Story of Howard Hewett"	August 24, 2016	Documenting the career, issues, & controversies of R&B recording artist Howard Hewett.	Interviews with Howard Hewett, Marvin Burke, Byron Williams (of Lyfe), April Sutton, Jeffrey Daniel, Micki Free, D'Lisa Davis (of Shalamar), Dick Griffey, Monty Seward, Leon Sylvers III, Steve Ivory, Doug Daniel, Robert Townsend, Dawnn Lewis, Steven Russel Harts (of Troop (group)), Tyrone Dubose, and Nia Peeples.	
Episode 111 – "The Story of Kurupt"	November 23, 2016	Documenting the trials and tribulations of Hip-Hop recording artist Kurupt.	Interviews with Kurupt, Kevin Battlecat (producer) Gilliam, Snoop Dogg, Diamond Icegirl, Lady of Rage, Kendrick Lamar, Fredwreck, Daz Dillinger, Melloe Won, and Julio G.	
Episode 112 – "The Story of Frankie Knuckles and the Roots of House music"	November 30, 2016	Documenting the career, trials, and tribulations of DJ Frankie Knuckles and the subgenre House he helped craft.	Interviews with Frankie Knuckles, Jesse Saunders, Wayne Williams, Inaya Day, Steve 'Silk' Hurley, Rachael Cain (of Trax Records), Farley Keith (as Farley 'Junkmaster' Funk), Fredrick Dunson, Jamie Principle, Robert Williams, Marcus Chapman, Marshall Jefferson, Byron Stingily (of Ten City), Curtis McClain, Lehia Franklin-Acox, Alan King, Crystal Waters, Teddy Douglas, Terry Hunter, and Mr. Bootsauce.	
Episode 113 – "The Story of Bobby Bland"	December 7, 2016	Documenting the trials and tribulations of Blues/R&B recording artist Bobby "Blue" Bland.	Interviews with John "Jabo" Starks, Bobby Rush (musician), Lawrence "Boo" Mitchell, Marcus Chapman, Al Bell, Regi Richards, Boz Scaggs, David Ritz, Guitar Shorty, Steve Barri, Joseph Hardin, Julius Lewis, Tony Coleman, and Pat Worley.	

=== Season 10 ===
Title	Original airdate	Short summary	Notable guest appearances	Notes
Episode 113- "The Story of SWV"	January 4, 2017	Documenting the careers of R&B/ Gospel group SWV.	Interviews with Leanne "Lelee" Lyons (as Lelee), Coko, Tamara Johnson-George (as Taj) (of SWV), Clyde "Lady Tibba" Gamble (as Tibba Gamble), Marcus Chapman, Kenny Ortiz, Brian Alexander Morgan, Kelly Rowland, Bell Biv DeVoe, Eddie George, Michael "Blue" Williams, Cory Taylor, and Allen "Allstar" Gordon.	
Episode 114 – "The Story of Fat Joe"	January 11, 2017	Documenting the trials and tribulations of Hip-Hop recording artist Fat Joe.	Interviews with Fat Joe, Diamond D, Jessy Terrero, Ralph McDaniels, Elliot Wilson, Steve Lobel, Ulysses Terrero, Rich Playa, Swizz Beatz, 50 Cent, Remy Ma, DJ Khaled, and Rob Markman.	
Episode 115 – "The Story of Jon B."	January 18, 2017	Documenting the career of R&B recording artist Jon B.	Interviews with Jon B, Steve Russell (of Troop (band)), Brian Laskey, Darryl Phillips, Tracey Edmonds, Kenny Babyface (musician) Edmonds, Jon-John Robinson (as Jonathan Robinson), Tammi Mac, Tim Kelley, and Nautica De La Cruz	
Episode 116 – "The Story of Lenny Williams"	January 25, 2017	Documenting the trials and tribulations of R&B recording artist Lenny Williams.	Interviews with Lenny Williams, Larry Graham, Emilio Castillo and David Garibaldi (of Tower of Power), Minor Ellis Williams, MC Hammer, Marcus Chapman, Luenell, David E. Talbert, Paul Mack Jr., and Jay King (of Club Nouveau).	Featured footage from the stand-up comedy film The Original Kings of Comedy.
Episode 117 – "The Story of Case"	February 1, 2017	Documenting the career of R&B vocalist Case.	Interviews with Case, James Maynes, Jojo Brim, Big Bub, Eddie F, Tina Davis, Marcus Chapman, Amadeus (record producer), Rea Davis, Ginuwine, Tim Kelley (of Tim & Bob), Nokio (of Dru Hill), Steve Ivory, and Michael Williams.	
Episode 118 – "The Story of Dave Hollister"	February 8, 2017	Documenting the career of R&B/Gospel recording artist Dave Hollister.	Interviews with Dave Hollister, Glenn Jones, Chopmaster J and Money-B (of Digital Underground), Teddy Riley, Rahman Hartzol, Erick Sermon (of EPMD), Bernard Alexander, Aundrae Russell, Mike City, Tank (American singer), Tim Kelley, Jesse Wright, and Bishop Keith Clark.	
Episode 119 – "The Story of After 7"	February 15, 2017	Documenting the trials and tribulations of R&B group After 7.	Interviews with Kenny "Babyface" Edmonds, Kevon Edmonds, Keith Mitchell, Jason Edmonds, Daryl Simmons, Allen McNeil and Steve Russell (of Troop (band)), Marcus Chapman, Gemma Corfield, Phil Quartararo, Sheila Coates, and Steven Ivory.	
Episode 120 – "A Tribute to James Brown"	February 22, 2017	Band members, friends, and stars of R&B and Hip-Hop celebrate the legacy of James Brown, the Godfather of Soul.	Interviews with Tyrone DuBose, Marcus Chapman, Steven Ivory, Martha High Harvin, Larry Graham, Mary Wilson, Bootsy Collins, Brenda Lee Eager, Frankie "Kash" Waddy, Chadwick Boseman, Paul Anthony, Brian "B-Fine" George, Lucien "Bowlegged Lou" George Jr. (of Full Force), John "Jabo" Starks, Clyde Stubblefield, Fred Wesley, Rickey Vincent, Kwamé, Money-B, and Jeff Foxx.	

=== Season 11 ===
Title	Original airdate	Short summary	Notable guest appearances	Notes
Episode 121 – "The Story of Wyclef Jean"	July 9, 2017	Documenting the issues and controversies of Hip-hop/Reggae recording artist Wyclef Jean.	Interviews with Wyclef Jean, Melky Jean (of Melky Sedeck), Jerry "Wonda" Duplessis, Chris Schwartz, Kurtis Blow, Tyesh Harris, DJ Red Alert, DJ Kay Slay, and Claudette Ortiz (of City High).	
Episode 122 – "The Story of Jagged Edge"	July 9, 2017	Documenting the rise and careers of R&B group Jagged Edge.	Interviews with Richard Wingo, Brian Casey, Brandon Casey (of Jagged Edge), Tameka Cottle (as "Tiny" Harris) and Kandi Burruss (of Xscape (group)), Tatu Hill, LaTavia Roberson (of Destiny's Child), Courtney Sills, Mia Redd, Kevin Wales, Jermaine Dupri, Marcus Chapman, Michael Mauldin, Julian Wright, Bryan-Michael Cox, Quinnes Parker (as Q Parker) and Bart Philips.	
Episode 123 – "The Story of Marvin Sapp"	July 16, 2017	Documenting the trials and tribulations of Gospel vocalist Marvin Sapp.	Interviews with Marvin Sapp, Karl Reid, Fred Hammond (of Commissioned (gospel group)), Kirk Franklin, Byron Cage, Dorinda Clark-Cole, Percy Bady, Marvin Winans Jr., Rev. DeForest Soaries, and Donald Lawrence.	
Episode 124 – "The Story of Switch"	July 23, 2017	Documenting the trials and tribulations of R&B band Switch.	Interviews with Akili Nickson, Michael McGlory, Phillip Ingram, Jody Sims, Greg Williams, Eddie Fluellen (of Switch), Marcus Chapman, El Debarge, Bunny Debarge (of DeBarge), Margena Christian, Miller London, and Cynthia Horner.	
Episode 125 – "The Story of The Dramatics"	July 30, 2017	Documenting the trials and tribulations of 1960s & 1970s R&B/Soul group The Dramatics.	Interviews with LJ Reynolds, Willie Ford, Larry "Squirrel" Demps (of The Dramatics), Snoop Dogg, Al Bell, Marcus Chapman, Cedric the Entertainer, Tony Green, Gerald McBride, David Washington, Foody, Sarah McMahan, Nana Osun Dara, Jon Mason, Tony Banks, Russell Thompkins Jr., Patricia Grant-Alston, Michael Henderson, and Marshall Thompson.	
Episode 126 - "The Story of Shanice"	August 6, 2017	Documenting the career of singer Shanice Wilson		
Episode 127 – "The Story of Ice-T"	August 13, 2017	Documenting the rise and career of pioneering Rapper/Actor Ice-T.	Interviews with Ice-T, Evil E, Ernie C, Sean E. Mac, Sean E. Sean, (of Body Count) Jorge Hinojosa, Mickey Bentson, Ice Cube, Busy Bee Starski (as Busy Bee), Ife Kiara, Al Patrome, Bob Merlis, Richard Oliver, Perry Farrell, Eric Greenspan, Chris Taylor (music producer) (as Chris "The Glove" Taylor), and Marcus Chapman.	Ice-T was previously featured in an episode of VH1's Behind the Music in 2000.
Episode 128 – "The Story of Silk"	February 18, 2018	Documenting the issues and controversies of R&B group Silk.	Interviews with Jimmy Gates, Tim "Timzo" Cameron, Tyga Graham, Johnathen "John-John" Rasboro, Gary "Big G" Glenn, Gary Jenkins (as Gary "Lil G" Jenkins) (of Silk), Chris Tucker, Keith Sweat, Joyce Littel, Rea Davis, 112 (band), and Darrell "Delite" Allamby.	
Episode 129 – "The Story of The Boys"	February 25, 2018	Documenting the trials & tribulations of the R&B group The Boys.	Interviews with Khiry Abdulsamad, Bilal Abdulsamad, Tajh Abdulsamad, Hakeem Abdulsamad (of The Boys), Craig T. Cooper, Cheryl Dickerson, Reuben Cannon, Mark Keene, Shanice Wilson, Daryl Simmons, Tracey Jordan, Rosie Perez, Jahmal Harris, Cynthia Horner, Hakim Bell, Kipper Jones, and Baba G.	
Episode 130 – "The Story of Trick Daddy"	March 4, 2018	Documenting the trials & tribulations of rapper Trick Daddy.	Interviews with Trick Daddy, Swole, Trina, Ted Lucas, Luther Campbell, Santana Melvin, Milk, DJ Khaled, and Charisse Lambert.	
Episode 131 – "The Story of Blue Magic"	March 11, 2018	Documenting the trials & tribulations of R&B group Blue Magic.	Interviews with Vernon Sawyer, Keith Beaton, Wendell J. Sawyer, Richard Pratt, Ted "Wizard" Mills, (of Blue Magic) Alan Rubens, Marcus Chapman, Bobby Eli, Dyana Williams, Joseph "Hot Dog" Williams Jr., Dirk Devlin, Ronnie DeVoe as Ronald DeVoe (of Bell Biv DeVoe), Debra Robinson, Anthony Abney, Freddie Holliday, Barry Galliard, Vinnie Barrett, James Gallagher, and Earl Young (drummer).	
Episode 132 – "The Story of Deborah Cox"	March 18, 2018	Documenting the rise & career of R&B vocalist Deborah Cox.	Interviews with Deborah Cox, Lascelles Stephens, Clive Davis, Shep Crawford, Delores Thompson, Tyrone DuBose, Warryn Campbell, Montell Jordan, Darren Grant, Hosh Gureli, RL (singer) (as R.L. Huggar) (of Next (American band)), Gwendolyn Quinn, Hex Hector, Rob Mounsey, Diana Fabreg, Angela Bassett, Nick Scandalios, and Judson Mills.	
Episode 133 – "The Story of Shirley Caesar"	March 25, 2018	Documenting the rise and career of pioneering Gospel vocalist Shirley Caesar.	Interviews with Shirley Caesar, Lisa Butts Powell (of The Caesar Singers), Tonex aka B. Slade, Dorothy Norwood (of The Caravans), Cece Winans, Tammy Caesar, Dottie Peoples, Karen Clark Sheard (of The Clark Sisters), Dr. Toy Lisa, Hezekiah Walker, Michael Mathis, Ken Harding, Sanchez Harley, Dr. Bobby Jones, Bubba Smith, Mildred Summerville, Phil Thornton, Aaron Meadows, and Aaron McNair.	
Episode 134 – "The Story of Avant"	April 8, 2018	Documenting the rise and career of singer Avant.	Interviews with Avant, Tony Respress, Nina Jones Respress, Battle, Bruce Al Smith, Kym Sellers, Steve Huff, Marilyn Batchelor, Keke Wyatt, Elroy Smith, and Jerry 'Big Jay' Woodard.	
Episode 135 – "The Story of Brand Nubian"	April 15, 2018	Documenting the rise and careers of Alternative hip hop group Brand Nubian.	Interviews with Lord Jamar, Grand Puba, Sadat X, DJ Alamo, DJ Sincere (of Brand Nubian), Ralph McDaniels, Reality, Dante Ross, Will Tell, Sway, Craig "Doodlebug" Irving (of Digable Planets, Fahim Nassar, Tonya Pendleton, Diamond D, stic.man (of Dead Prez, John Scott, Drew Dixon, .	
Episode 136 – "The Story of The Lost Boyz"	April 22, 2018	Chronicling the rise and careers of Hip Hop group The Lost Boyz.	Interviews with Mr. Cheeks, Pretty Lou (of The Lost Boyz) Shawn McDonald, Charles Suitt, Tim Patterson, Dramills, Jay Ball & Shawn Rogers, Sparkle, .	

=== Season 12 ===
Title	Original airdate	Short summary	Notable guest appearances	Notes
Episode 137 – "The Story of Mtume"	May 20, 2018	Chronicling the rise and careers of R&B Funk group Mtume.	Interviews with James Mtume, Basil Fearrington, Tawatha Agee, Hubert Eaves III, Ed "Tree" Moore, Philip Field, Dyana Williams, Nelson George, Dr. Scot Brown, Wallace Roney, Wade Dean, Vincent Henry, Fatiyn Muhammad, Daddy-O (musician) (of Stetsasonic), Robert Pickett (of 107.5 WBLS Open Line), Kenny Gamble, Andre Harrell, and Lyah Leflore.	
Episode 138 – "The Story of Special Ed"	May 27, 2018	Documenting the rise and career of hip hop artist Special Ed.	Interviews with Special Ed, Rampage (rapper), Cory Robbins, Felicia 'The Poetess' Morris, Chubb Rock, Tami Mac, Shawn 'Shillz' Lloyd, Dana Dane, Monie Love, Terry Gittens, Howie Tee, Ralph McDaniels, and DJ AK Shun.	
Episode 139 – "The Story of Digable Planets"	June 3, 2018	Documenting the rise and careers of Alternative hip hop group Digable Planets.	Interviews with Ishmael Butler (as Ishmael "Butterfly" Butler), Craig "Doodlebug" Irving, Mariana "Ladybug" Vieira, (of Digable Planets), Ruben Rodriguez, Tonya Pendleton, Wade Dean, King Britt, Dave Darlington, Lord Jamar (of Brand Nubian), Cheo Hodari Coker, Power Malu, Bahamadia, Ron Minor, Tasha Smith, and Dania Thomas-Butler.	
Episode 140 – "The Story of Regina Belle"	June 10, 2018	Documenting the trials and tribulations of R&B and Gospel vocalist Regina Belle.	Interviews with Regina Belle, Joel McEwen, Ruben Rodriguez, Paul Hannah, Ledesi, Yvette Roland Becker, Don B. Welch, Jamie Jones & Jack Kugell, Ray Briggs, John Battle (basketball), Peabo Bryson, and Adam Lamar.	Regina Belle was previously featured on an episode of TVOne's Life After in 2012.
Episode 141 – "The Story of 702"	June 17, 2018	Documenting the issues & controversies of R&B girl group 702.	Interviews with Irish Grinstead, LeMisha Grinstead (as Misha), Kameelah Williams (as Meelah), Amelia Cruz, Tiffany Villarreal (of 702), Donnell Jones, Corey Taylor, Missy Elliott, Laurie Ann Gibson, Tye-V, Rea Davis, Chad Elliott, Andrea Corsey, Sinbad, Lovell Randolph, Michael Bivins (of New Edition & Bell Biv DeVoe), Todd Russaw, Musiq Soulchild, Keith Thomas (of Subway (group)), Andre Harrell, Troy Taylor, and Dedra N. Tate.	
Episode 142 – "The Story of B.B. King"	June 24, 2018	Chronicling the rise and career of legendary Blues guitarist and singer B.B. King.	Interviews with Joe Louis Walker, Buddy Guy, Bobby Rush, Myron Johnson, Charles Sawyer, Stewart Levine, Denise LaSalle, Tony "TC" Coleman, Anne the Raven, Floyd Newman, James Bolden, Bill Szymczyk, Rodd Bland, and Walter Riley King.	
Episode 143 – "The Story of Cheryl "Pepsii" Riley"	July 1, 2018	Documenting the rise and career of R&B vocalist and actress Cheryl "Pepsii" Riley.	Interviews with Cheryl "Pepsii" Riley, Tyler Perry, Tony Terry, "Paul Anthony", "Bowlegged Lou", and "B-Fine", (of Full Force), Shemar Moore, Ruben Rodriguez, Lenny Greene, and Alyson Williams.	
Episode 144 – "The Story of Will Downing"	July 8, 2018	Documenting the trials and tribulations of R&B and Jazz vocalist Will Downing.	Interviews with Will Downing, Regina Belle, Danny Madden, William Holloway, Barry Eastmond, Bob Baldwin, James D-Train Williams, Delores Thompson, Dyana Williams, Kyle Newport, Zane Mark, Kenny Lattimore, Rex Rideout, and Hubert Eaves IV.	
Episode 145 – "The Story of Michel'le"	July 15, 2018	Documenting the rise and career of R&B vocalist Michel'le.	Interviews with Michel'le, Dania Birks & Juana Sperling, Steven Russell Harts (of Troop (band)), Donald Bruner, Daren Jeter, Alonzo Williams (of World Class Wreckin' Cru), Leslie "Big Lez" Segar, Nautica De La Cruz, Mona Lisa (of World Class Wreckin' Cru), Reggie Lamb, and Rhyon Nicole Brown.	

=== Season 13 ===
Title	Original airdate	Short summary	Notable guest appearances	Notes
Episode 146 – "The Story of Lloyd"	March 3, 2019	Chronicling the rise and turbulent career of R&B vocalist & Rapper Lloyd.	Interviews with Lloyd, Jazze Pha, Jazmyne Summers, Jasper "Big Love" Cameron, Ashanti (singer), Cristal Bubblin, Christopher "Tricky" Stewart, Chuckie D. (of N-Toon), Joyce Irby (of Klymaxx), Irv Gotti, Big Reese.	
Episode 147 – "The Story of Adina Howard"	March 10, 2019	Documenting the rise and career of R&B vocalist and Hip Hop artist Adina Howard.	Interviews with Adina Howard, Roget Romain, Livio Harris, Nautica De La Cruz (radio KJLH)), Cece Peniston, Keith Murphy, Billy Moss, Dion Fearon, and Joe Torry.	Adina Howard was previously featured on an episode of TVOne's Life After in 2013.
Episode 148 – "The Story of The Jets"	March 17, 2019	Documenting the rise and careers of Polynesian R&B/Pop group The Jets.	Interviews with Leroy Wolfgramm, Elizabeth Wolfgramm, Haini Wolfgramm, Eugene Wolfgramm, Kathi Wolfgramm, (of The Jets), Ernie Singleton, A. Scott Galloway, Delores Thompson, David Z (music producer) (as David Z. Rivkin), Aaron Zigman, Linda Mallah, Rick Kelly	
Episode 149 – "The Story of Shirley Murdock"	March 24, 2019	Chronicling the trials & tribulations of Gospel and R&B singer-songwriter Shirley Murdock.	Interviews with Shirley Murdock, Terry Troutman, Lester Troutman, Dale DeGroat, Ricardo Bray, Bigg Robb, (of Zapp) Shanice, Kelly Price, Eddie Levert (of The O'Jays), Howard Hewett (of Shalamar), Ben Tankard, Billy Beck (of Ohio Players), David Mitchell, and Wade Dean.	
Episode 150 – "The Story of Crystal Waters"	March 31, 2019	Documenting the rise and career of House vocalist & songwriter Crystal Waters.	Interviews with Crystal Waters, Thommy Davis, Teddy Douglas, Jay Steinhour (of Basement Boys), Duane Harden, Bert Collins, Flex Alexander, George Correia, Lamont Reese, Bruce Carbone, Kid Capri, Junior Sanchez, Vito Bruno, Robert Irvine, Lady Bunny, Duane Gazi-White, Michael K. Williams, and Sted-E & Hybrid Heights.	
Episode 151 – "The Story of Glenn Jones"	April 7, 2019	Documenting the rise and career of Gospel & R&B singer-songwriter Glenn Jones.	Interviews with Glenn Jones, Genobia Jeter (as Genobia Jones), Dave Hollister, Tony Terry, Norman Connors, Bone Crusher (rapper), Y'Anna Crawley, Bowlegged Lou (of Full Force), Meli'sa Morgan, Harvey Watkins Jr. (of The Canton Spirituals), Jazmyn Summers, Porsche Foxx, Cristal Bubblin, Tonya Hawley, and Prince Levy.	
Episode 152 – "The Story of Kenny Lattimore"	April 14, 2019	Documenting the issues and controversies of R&B/Soul and Gospel vocalist Kenny Lattimore.	Interviews with Kenny Lattimore, Baary Eastman, Kipper Jones, Jawn Murray, Nautica De La Cruz, Aaron Lindsey, Kym Whitley, Vern Goff, Jaye Dibbs, Matt Jones, Tyrone DuBose, Carvin Haggins, DJ Malski, Michael Mauldin, Don B. Welch, and Pete Farmer.	
Episode 153 – "The Story of Tasha Cobbs"	April 21, 2019	Documenting the rise and career of Gospel singer Tasha Cobbs-Leonard.	Interviews with Tasha Cobbs-Leonard, Erica Campbell, Kirk Franklin, Darlene McCoy, Willie "Pdub" Moore Jr., VaShawn Mitchell, Ken Pennell, and EG Gaines.	

=== Season 14 ===
Title	Original airdate	Short summary	Notable guest appearances	Notes
Episode 154 – "The Story of Dru Hill"	February 23, 2020	Documenting the rise and turbulent careers of R&B group Dru Hill.	Interviews with Sisqo, Nokio, Woody, Jazz, Scola Dinero, Tao, Black, Smoke, Stanley Brown, Richele Ellison, Keith Sweat, Jazmyn Summers, Kevin Peck, Daryl Simmons, A. Haqq Islam, Hiram Hicks, and Jaha Johnson.	
Episode 155 – "The Story of Roxanne Shante"	March 1, 2020	Documenting the rise and career of legendary battle-emcee Roxanne Shante.	Interviews with Roxanne Shante, Biz Markie, Big Daddy Kane, Yo-Yo (rapper), Tyrone Williams, Alonzo Brown (of Dr. Jeckyll & Mr. Hyde (group)), Sparky D, DJ Cool V, Craig G (of Juice Crew), Spyder-D, and Nautica De la Cruz.	
Episode 156 – "The Story of Christopher Williams"	March 3, 2020	Documenting the rise and turbulent career of R&B/Soul performer Christopher Williams.	Interviews with Christopher Williams, Big Lez, Al B. Sure!, Faith Evans, Andre Harrell (of Dr. Jeckyll & Mr. Hyde), Cassandra Mills, Vivian Scott-Chew, and Tammi Mac.	
Episode 157 – "The Story of Skyy (band)"	March 15, 2020	Documenting the rise and career of the genre-crossing band Skyy.	Interviews with Randy Muller, Denise Wilkinson, Bonnie Williams, Delores Milligan, Larry Greenberg, Solomon Roberts Jr., (of Skyy), Ken Cayre (of Salsoul Records), Inaya Day, Michael Grudge, Nelson George, and Marcus Chapman.	
Episode 158 – "The Story of Shannon (singer)"	March 22, 2020	Documenting the rise and career of R&B/Freestyle music singer Shannon.	Interviews with Shannon, Chris Barbosa (of Emergency Records), Lisa Lisa, John Benitez, Jazmyn Summers, Christal Bubblin, Jerry Greenberg (of Mirage Records), Curtis Urbina, Sal Abbatiello (of Fever Records)	
Episode 158 – "The Story of Billy Paul"	March 29, 2020	Documenting the trials and tribulations of R&B/Soul singer Billy Paul.	Interviews with Schoolly D, Dexter Wansel, Marcus Chapman.	
Episode 159 – "The Story of Betty Wright"	April 5, 2020	Chronicling the trials & tribulations of R&B/Soul singer Betty Wright.	Interviews with Betty Wright, Lil Wayne, Angie Stone, James Thomas Jr., Lovette McGill, Regina Belle, Harry Casey (KC & the Sunshine Band), DJ Khaled, Timmy Thomas, Trick Daddy, Steve Alaimo, Asher Makeba, Margaret Reynolds (of KC & the Sunshine Band).	The last interview Betty Wright conducted before her untimely death, on May 10, 2020.
Episode 160 – "The Story of Al Jarreau"	April 12, 2020	Documenting the rise and career of Jazz, R&B/Soul vocalist Al Jarreau.	Interviews with Larry Williams (jazz musician), Nathan East, Richard Dworsky, Marcus Miller, Joe Turano, Patrick Rains, Chris Walker (musician), Julio Martinez, Bill Straw (Blix Street Records), Freda Payne, Greg Mathieson, Al Schmitt, Jay Graydon, Jerry Levin, Paul Brown, Jerry Hey, Roger Murrah, Steve Ivory, Jazmyn Summers (radio KBLX), Pat Prescott (radio KTWV).	
Episode 161 – "The Story of Goodie Mob"	April 19, 2020	Documenting the rise and careers of R&B/Hip Hop group Goodie Mob.	Interviews with T-Mo, Big Gipp, Khujo, Killer Mike, Ceelo Green (of Goodie Mob), Andre 3000 Big Boi (of Outkast), Sleepy Brown, Rico Wade, Ray Murphy (of Noi ), T.I., Bone Crusher, and Dallas Austin.	

=== Season 15 ===
Title	Original airdate	Short summary	Notable guest appearances	Notes
Episode 162 – "The Story of Morris Day"	March 21, 2021	Chronicling the life & career of R&B/Pop artist Morris Day.	Interviews with Morris Day, Jerome Benton, Jellybean Johnson, Terry Lewis & Jimmy Jam, Pepe Willie, Rickey Smith, Cedric the Entertainer, and Snoop Dogg.	
Episode 163 – "The Story of Leela James"	March 28, 2021	Documenting the	Interviews with Leela James,	
Episode 164 – "The Story of Hezekiah Walker"	April 4, 2021	Documenting the	Interviews with Hezekiah Walker,	
Episode 165 – "The Story of Keith Washington"	April 11, 2021	Chronicling the	Interviews with Keith Washington,	
Episode 166 – "The Story of Mystikal"	April 18, 2021	Documenting the	Interviews with Mystikal,	
Episode 167 – "The Story of Syleena Johnson"	April 25, 2021	Documenting the	Interviews with Syleena Johnson,	
Episode 168 – "The Story of Bobby V."	May 2, 2021	Documenting the	Interviews with Bobby V.,	
Episode 169 – "The Story of Lyfe Jennings"	May 9, 2021	Documenting the	Interviews with Lyfe Jennings,	
Episode 170 – "The Story of The Jones Girls"	May 23, 2021	Documenting the	Interviews with, Shirley Jones (Original Member of The Jones Girls)	
