= Still in Love with You =

Still in Love with You may refer to:

- Still in Love with You (album), a 1992 album from Meli'sa Morgan
- "Still in Love with You" (Anna Vissi song), 2001
- "Still in Love with You" (Dragon song), 1978
- "Still in Love with You" (Electro Velvet song), 2015
- "Still in Love with You" (No Angels song), 2002
- "Still in Love with You" (Thin Lizzy song), 1974
- "Still in Love with You" (Travis Tritt song), 1997
- "Still in Love With You", a 1991 song by Brooks & Dunn from the album Brand New Man
- "Still in Love with You", a 2007 song by Jonas Brothers from the album Jonas Brothers
- "Still in Love with You", a song by Karen Carpenter released on the 1996 posthumous solo album Karen Carpenter

== See also ==
- I'm Still in Love with You (disambiguation)
- Still in Love (disambiguation)
