= Love Demands =

Studio album by Meli'sa Morgan
- Released: July 13, 2018
- Genre: Soul; funk
- Length: 43:19
- Label: Goldenlane
- Producer: Brady Gasser, Justin Slattery; Jürgen Engler

Meli'sa Morgan chronology
I Remember (2005)	Love Demands (2018)

Love Demands is the sixth studio album by American recording artist Meli'sa Morgan, released in 2018 and issued by Goldenlane Records. The album features Morgan's interpretation on a selection of songs originally recorded by Tom Jones, The Supremes, the Bee Gees, Aretha Franklin and Sam Cooke.

Also included are new tracks co-written Morgan and two bonus tracks of newly recorded versions of her 1980s hit "Fool's Paradise" and "Do Me, Baby", original recorded by Prince.

== Track listing ==
No.	Title	Writer(s)	Length
1.	"How Can You Mend a Broken Heart"	Barry Gibb; Robin Gibb	5:10
2.	"Never Loved a Man (The Way I Love You)"	Ronnie Shannon	3:01
3.	"Love Is Here and Now You're Gone"	Lamont Dozier; Brian Holland; Eddie Holland	3:35
4.	"I've Been Loving You Too Long"	Otis Redding; Jerry Butler	2:57
5.	"It's Not Unusual"	Les Reed; Gordon Mills	2:52
6.	"Nothing Can Change This Love"	Sam Cooke	2:48
7.	"Love Demands"	Brady Gasser; J. Meli'sa Morgan	3:47
8.	"Can't Explain"	B. Gasser; J. M. Morgan	3:42
9.	"Holla"	B. Gasser; J. M. Morgan	4:07
10.	"Decisions" (featuring Sabastin Commas)	B. Gasser; J. M. Morgan	3:30
11.	"The Only One"	B. Gasser; J. M. Morgan; Sabastin Commas	3:57
12.	"No More"	B. Gasser; J. M. Morgan	3:56

Bonus tracks
No.	Title	Writer(s)	Length
13.	"Do Me, Baby" (Love Demands Sessions)	Prince	5:19
14.	"Fool's Paradise" (Love Demands Sessions)	Lesette Wilson; J.M. Morgan	5:16

== Credits ==
Credits taken from album liner notes.

- Co-producer – Meli'sa Morgan, G-Easy
- Instruments [Music By] – Jurgen Engler (tracks: 13, 14)
- Lead Vocals, Backing Vocals, Arranged By [Vocal] – Meli'sa Morgan
- Backing Vocals [Rap Vocals] – Sabastin Commas (track: 10)
- Recorded By [Vocals] – Pete Mills
- Management – Asilem Productions
- Producer – Gozza (tracks: 7 to 12), Jurgen Engler (tracks: 1 to 6, 13, 14), Slattery (tracks: 7 to 9)

Copyright (c) – Goldenlane Records, Phonographic Copyright (p) – Goldenlane Records Produced For – EarthMovers Productions – Produced For – Asilem Productions, Inc.
