= I'm Still in Love with You =

I'm Still in Love with You may refer to:

== Albums ==
- I'm Still in Love with You (Al Green album), or its title song (see below)
- I'm Still in Love with You (Roy Orbison album)

== Songs ==
- "I'm Still in Love with You", a song by Alton Ellis, 1967
- "I'm Still in Love with You" (Al Green song), 1972
- "I'm Still in Love with You" (New Edition song), 1996
- "I'm Still in Love with You" (Sean Paul song), 2003
- "I'm Still in Love with You Boy", a cover of the Alton Ellis song by Marcia Aitken
- "I'm Still in Love with You", a song by Steve Earle from his 1999 album The Mountain

== See also ==
- Still in Love with You (disambiguation)
- Still in Love (disambiguation)
