= African-American Music Appreciation Month =

Annual celebration of African-American music in the US

Black Music Appreciation Month is an annual celebration of African-American music in the United States. It was initiated as Black Music Month by President Jimmy Carter, who, on June 7, 1979, decreed that June would be the month of Black music. After the announcement by Carter, the bill finally passed in 2000 when activist Dyana Williams' 10 years of effort persuaded Congress. Williams played an essential role in the creation and solidification of Black Music Month, along with Kenneth Gamble and Ed Wright.

Since the beginning of colonization, music and song formation has been a preservation technique for African culture. Slavery is a significant part of Black music's origin and historical evolution. While colonization tried to dilute and erase African culture, Africans maintained their stories of culture through the language of songs. Black Music Month recognizes their development into genres such as rap, jazz, soul music, funk, hip hop, and more.

== History ==
During the transportation of Africans to the West in the 1600s and 1700s, they maintained their culture through tribal chants, language, religious beliefs, and emotional expression. However, plantation owners were apprehensive about African culture because of its potential to cause an uprising. As a result, Africans utilized variations of storytelling through music to maintain their traditions and culture. The development of Black music occurred during and after slavery, which formed genres such as gospel music or the blues.

Black Music Month became African American Music Appreciation Month in 2009 by a proclamation from President Barack Obama. In his 2016 proclamation, Obama noted that African-American music and musicians have helped the country "to dance, to express our faith through song, to march against injustice, and to defend our country's enduring promise of freedom and opportunity for all." In 2023, President Joe Biden returned it to its original name of Black Music Month.

== Important figures ==
Music producer Kenneth Gamble and entertainment industry executive Ed Wright both helped initiate Black Music Month's establishment. Gamble has been recognized for his many contributions to the music industry, including his partnership with Leon Huff. Huff and Gamble became popular for their music label Philadelphia International Records and their expansion of soul music in Philadelphia.

Ed Wright, who worked in the entertainment industry, also contributed to establishing the month. Since the age of 13, Wright was a part of the entertainment industry, starting as an announcer for WCIN radio in Cincinnati. Wright died in September 2023 from natural causes. Wright and Gamble met at the National Association of Television & Radio Announcers convention, and eventually co-founded the Black Music Association in 1978.

Dyana Williams has worked in radio for 52 years, and continues her work through company Influence Entertainment. Williams was the founder of International Association of African American Music in the 1990s which helped advocate for Black Music Month. In addition to this organization, she contributed directly to Black Music Month by co-authoring House Concurrent Bill 509. Although the month was recognized by Jimmy Carter hosting a reception and concert for Black music in 1979, it was officially established through Congress in 2000 because of Williams' advocacy.

== See also ==
- RnB
