= The Lady in Me =

Studio album by Meli'sa Morgan
- Released: May 10, 1990
- Studios: Institute of Groove, Malibu, FL; Ultimo, Westwood, CA; The Lighthouse, North Hollywood, CA
- Genres: R&B, soul
- Length: 53:57
- Label: Capitol
- Producers: Attala Zane Giles, Meli'sa Morgan

Meli'sa Morgan chronology
| Good Love (1987) | The Lady in Me (1990) | Still in Love with You (1992) |

Singles from The Lady in Me
- 1. "Can You Give Me What I Want" Released: May 7, 1990; 2. "Don't You Know" Released: July 11, 1990

The Lady in Me is the third studio album by the American recording artist Meli'sa Morgan, released in 1990 on Capitol Records. The lead single, "Can You Give Me What I Want", became a top 30 hit on Billboards Top R&B Songs chart. The album was not as successful as Morgan's previous releases.

== Critical reception ==
Professional ratings
Review scores
| Source | Rating |
|---|---|
| AllMusic | 3/5 stars |

Ebony called the album "a delightful mixture of driving dance grooves and meaningful, romantic ballads." Alex Henderson of AllMusic wrote, "Unfortunately, the results are often unimpressive and disappointing." Henderson noted that the album does contain a few memorable songs, including "I'm Better Now" and "Don't You Know".

== Track listing ==
| No. | Title | Writer(s) | Length |
|---|---|---|---|
| 1. | "Can You Give Me What I Want" | Attala Zane Giles; Meli'sa Morgan | 5:34 |
| 2. | "Stop, Love and Listen" | Giles; Chuckii Booker; Cornelius Mims; Morgan | 4:04 |
| 3. | "You Belong to Me" | Morgan; Scott Brown | 5:09 |
| 4. | "Situations" | Morgan; Brown | 4:59 |
| 5. | "Dancing into Love" | Morgan; Brown | 4:25 |
| 6. | "Don’t You Know" | Gene Lake; Morgan; Brown | 5:17 |
| 7. | "Wrong Lane" | Morgan; Brown | 5:20 |
| 8. | "The Lady in Me" | Giles; Morgan | 4:49 |
| 9. | "I’m Better Now" | Giles; Morgan | 5:09 |
| 10. | "So Long, Goodbye" | LeMel Humes; Morgan | 5:00 |

== Credits ==
Credits taken from album liner notes.

- Composed By [All Interludes] – Attala Zane Giles, Meli'sa Morgan
- Vocals Arranged By – Meli'sa Morgan, Additional Vocals, Arranged By – Attala Zane Giles
- Drum Programming – Attala Zane Giles (tracks: 1, 3, 4, 6 to 10), Cornelius Mims (tracks: 2, 5)
- Backing Vocals – Attala Zane Giles (tracks: 1, 10), Kevin Dorsey (tracks: 1, 10), Meli'sa Morgan (tracks: 1 to 3, 5 to 10)
- Bass – Cornelius Mims (tracks: 6)
- Guitar – Attala Zane Giles (tracks: 1, 3, 6 to 8)
- Horns – Cornelius Mims (tracks: 2, 5)
- Keyboards – Attala Zane Giles (tracks: 1, 3, 4, 6 to 10), Cornelius Mims (tracks: 2, 5)
- Saxophone – Gerald Albright (tracks: 6)
- Percussion – Attala Zane Giles (tracks: 1, 3), Paulinho Da Costa (tracks: 5, 6, 8)
- Piano – Eddie Fluellen (tracks: 8), Wayne Vaughn (tracks: 7)
- Percussion – Paulinho Da Costa (tracks: 5, 6, 8)
- Keyboards [Additional] – Eddie Fluellen (tracks: 6)
- Engineer [Mix] – Barney Perkins
- Engineer [Recording] – Robert Macias
- Co-producer – Meli'sa Morgan
- Executive-Producer – Scott Folks
- Producer – Attala Zane Giles

Recorded at: Institute of Groove Research, Malibu; Ultimo, Westwood; and the Lighthouse, North Hollywood, California

== Singles ==
| Year | Title | US R&B |
|---|---|---|
| 1990 | "Can You Give Me What I Want" | 33 |
