= I Remember (Meli'sa Morgan album) =

Studio album by Meli'sa Morgan
- Released: November 8, 2005
- Genre: R&B; soul
- Length: 55:34
- Label: Orpheus Music, Lu Ann Records
- Producer: Nickolas Ashford, Valerie Simpson, Yasha, YZ; Cato Jones, Shawn V. Lucas; Lesette Wilson, Meli'sa Morgan

Meli'sa Morgan chronology
Do You Still Love Me?: The Best of Meli'sa Morgan (1996)	I Remember (2005)	Love Demands (2018)

I Remember is a studio album by American recording artist Meli'sa Morgan, released in 2005 and issued by Lu Ann/Orpheus Records. The album consist of three covers produced by Valerie Simpson and Nickolas Ashford, as well as new songs produced by Morgan and longtime collaborator Lesette Wilson. The album's lead single "Back Together Again" is a ballad duet with R&B singer Freddie Jackson.

== Track listing ==
No.	Title	Writer(s)	Length
1.	"Intro Vocal"	Joyce M. Morgan	0:26
2.	"Ain't Nothing Like the Real Thing (Interlude)"	Nickolas Ashford; Valerie Simpson	1:03
3.	"Back Together Again" (featuring Freddie Jackson)	James Mtume; Reggie Lucas	5:00
4.	"I Remember..."	Joyce M. Morgan; Lesette Wilson	4:00
5.	"Will You"	Joyce M. Morgan * LaDette	3:24
6.	"Feel You"	Joyce M. Morgan; Lesette Wilson	3:50
7.	"High Maintenance"	Balewa Muhammad; Royal Bayyan	3:52
8.	"Ain't No Way (Interlude)"	Carolyn Franklin	2:34
9.	"Alright, Alright"	Joyce M. Morgan * LaDette	3:10
10.	"Let You Go"	Joyce M. Morgan; Lesette Wilson	4:04
11.	"There'll Never Be"	Joyce M. Morgan; Lesette Wilson	4:16
12.	"Pack'd My Bags (My Idol/Interlude)"	Tony Maiden; Yvette M. Stevens	2:49
13.	"I'm Your Sistah"	Joyce M. Morgan; Lesette Wilson	4:09
14.	"Same Ole, Same Old"	Joyce M. Morgan; Lesette Wilson	3:32
15.	"Do You, Do You Want It?"	Meli'sa Morgan; Shawn V. Lucas	4:02
16.	"Touch It"/"I'm So Into You (Interlude)"	Robert L. Bryson	1:52
17.	"He's The One"	Nickolas Ashford; Valerie Simpson	3:32

== Credits ==
Credits taken from album liner notes.

- Executive-Producer – Beau Huggins, Charli Huggins*
- Mastered By – Jim Brick
- Mixed By – Ari Raskin (tracks: 9, 15), Denis Feres (tracks: 4, 6, 8, 10 to 14, 16, 17), Kevin Crouse (tracks: 5), Royal *Bayyan (tracks: 7), Yasha* (tracks: 3)
- Recorded By – Denis Feres (tracks: 2, 8, 12, 16, 17), John Bender (2) (tracks: 3), Josh McDonnell* (tracks: 4, 6, 10, 11, 13, 14), Royal Bayyan (tracks: 7), Shawn Lucas (tracks: 15), Tarik Bayyan (tracks: 7), YZ (3) (tracks: 5, 9)
- Recorded By [Additional] – Mike Rogers (tracks: 3)
- Piano - Shawn V. Lucas (track 1), Valerie Simpson (tracks: 2, 8, 12, 16)
- Background vocals - Vaughn Harper, Balewa Muhammond, Meli'sa Morgan
- Producer - Yasha (track 3)
- Producers [Instruments], Arranged by - Royal Bayyan, Lesette Wilson, Meli'sa Morgan
- Phonographic Copyright (p) – Orpheus Music,

Copyright (c) – Orpheus Music, Phonographic Copyright (p) – Lu Ann Entertainment, Copyright (c) – Lu Ann Entertainment
Distributed, Manufactured By – Orpheus Music

== Singles ==
Year	Title	US Pop	US R&B
2005	"Back Together Again" (feat. Freddie Jackson)	—	46
