= Do Me Baby (album) =

Studio album by Meli'sa Morgan
- Released: January 17, 1986
- Recorded: 1985
- Genre: R&B
- Length: 40:06
- Label: Capitol
- Producer: Lesette Wilson; Meli'sa Morgan; Paul Laurence; Bryan Loren

Meli'sa Morgan chronology
Do Me Baby (1986)	Good Love (1987)

Singles from Do Me Baby
- 1. "Do Me Baby" Released: November 21, 1985; 2. "Do You Still Love Me?" Released: March 19, 1986; 3. "Fool's Paradise" Released: July 9, 1986

Professional ratings
Review scores
Source	Rating
Allmusic	4.5/5 stars

Do Me Baby is the debut studio album by American recording artist Meli'sa Morgan. Released on January 17, 1986, it reached number 41 on the US Billboard Pop Albums and number 4 on the US R&B Albums chart and was certified gold by the RIAA in May of 2024. The album features the number-one R&B hit "Do Me, Baby", a cover of the Prince song. 38 years into its release, the album was certified gold by the Recording Industry Association of America for sales equivalent units of 500,000 copies alone in the United States.

== Track listing ==
Credits adapted from original liner notes.

No.	Title	Writer(s)	Producer(s)	Length
1.	"Fool's Paradise"	Lesette Wilson; Meli'sa Morgan	Lesette Wilson; Meli'sa Morgan	4:56
2.	"Heart Breaking Decision"	Freddie Jackson; Meli'sa Morgan; Robert Aries	Paul Laurence	4:36
3.	"Do You Still Love Me?"	Lesette Wilson; Meli'sa Morgan	Lesette Wilson; Meli'sa Morgan	5:41
4.	"I'll Give It When I Want It"	Lesette Wilson; Meli'sa Morgan	Lesette Wilson; Meli'sa Morgan	4:33
5.	"Do Me, Baby"	André Cymone (Uncredited), Prince	Paul Laurence	5:17
6.	"Getting to Know You Better"	Doug Grigsby; Meli'sa Morgan; Terri Jeffries	Bryan Loren	5:38
7.	"Now or Never"	Lesette Wilson; Meli'sa Morgan	Lesette Wilson; Meli'sa Morgan	4:33
8.	"Lies"	Meli'sa Morgan; Paul Laurence; Royal Bayyan	Paul Laurence	4:52

== Personnel ==
Credits adapted from original liner notes.

- Alto Saxophone – Najee
- Arranged By – Robert Aries
- Art Direction – Roy Kohara
- Backing Vocals – Clifford Jamerson, Freddie Jackson, Genobia Jeter, Joseph Coleman*, Meli'sa Morgan
- Bass – Douglas Grigsby I I I*, Russell Blake, Timmy Allen
- Design – John O'Brien (4)
- Drum Programming – Royal Bayyan
- Executive-Producer – Beau Huggins, Don Grierson
- Guitar – Douglas Grigsby I I I*, Edward "Speedy" Walker*, Fareed Abdul Haqq, Michael Campbell*
- Handclaps – Ronnie Jones (2), Wayne Edwards (2)
- Keyboards – Lesette Wilson
- Keyboards [Kurzweil] – Paul Laurence
- Percussion – Douglas Grigsby I I I*
- Percussion [Additional] – Ronnie Jones (2), Wayne Edwards (2)
- Programmed By – Rick Stevenson (3)
- Synthesizer – Lesette Wilson, Meli'sa Morgan, Royal Bayyan

== Charts ==
=== Weekly charts ===
Chart (1986)	Peak position
US Billboard 200	41
US Top R&B/Hip-Hop Albums (Billboard)	4

=== Year-end charts ===
Chart (1986)	Position
US Billboard 200	86
US Top R&B/Hip-Hop Albums (Billboard)	9

== Singles ==
Year	Title	US Pop	US R&B	US Dan	UK
1985	"Do Me Baby"	46	1	—	—
1986	"Do You Still Love Me?"	—	5	—	—
1986	"Fool's Paradise"	—	24	—	41

== Certifications ==
Region	Certification	Certified units/sales
United States (RIAA)	Gold	500,000^{‡}
^{‡} Sales+streaming figures based on certification alone.
