= Still in Love =

Still in Love may refer to:

- Still in Love (horse), a Japanese Thoroughbred racehorse and broodmare
- Still in Love (album), a 1982 album by Carrie Lucas, or its title track
- "Still in Love", a song by 112 from Part III
- "Still in Love", a song by Brian McKnight from I Remember You
- "Still in Love", a song by Brooke Fraser from What to Do with Daylight
- "Still in Love", a song by Corey Hart from Young Man Running
- "Still in Love", a song by Nick Cave and the Bad Seeds from Nocturama
- "Still in Love", a song by David Gates, from the album Take Me Now
- "Still in Love", a song by Lionel Richie from Louder Than Words
- "Still in Love", a song by Diana Ross from Silk Electric
- "Still in Love", a song by Supertramp from Brother Where You Bound
- "Still in Love", a song by Tyra B
- "Still in Love (Kissing You)", a Beyoncé Knowles cover version of the song "Kissing You" by Des'ree

== See also ==
- Still in Love with You (disambiguation)
- I'm Still in Love with You (disambiguation)
