= Good Love (Meli'sa Morgan album) =

Studio album by Meli'sa Morgan
- Released: 1987
- Genre: R&B; soul
- Length: 43:02
- Label: Capitol
- Producer: Paul Laurence; Kashif; Lesette Wilson; Meli'sa Morgan; Carl Sturken; Evan Rogers

Meli'sa Morgan chronology
| Do Me Baby (1986) | Good Love (1987) | The Lady in Me (1990) |

Singles from Good Love
- 1. "If You Can Do It: I Can Too!" Released: October 4, 1987; 2. "Love Changes" Released: November 11, 1987; 3. "Here Comes the Night" Released: February 12, 1988; 4. "Good Love" Released: April 6, 1988

Good Love is the second studio album by American recording artist Meli'sa Morgan, released in 1987 under Capitol Records. The album reached number 11 on the US Billboard R&B Albums Chart, and two singles released both peaking at number-two on the R&B Singles Chart, "If You Can Do It: I Can Too!", and the duet "Love Changes" with singer Kashif.

== Track listing ==
Credits taken from original album liner notes.

| No. | Title | Writer(s) | Producer(s) | Length |
|---|---|---|---|---|
| 1. | "If You Can Do It: I Can Too!" | Paul Laurence | Laurence | 4:56 |
| 2. | "Here Comes the Night" | Carl Sturken; Evan Rogers | Kashif; Sturken; Rogers | 4:24 |
| 3. | "Just for Your Touch" | Lesette Wilson; Meli'sa Morgan | L. Wilson; M. Morgan | 4:20 |
| 4. | "Good Love" | L. Wilson; M. Morgan | L. Wilson; M. Morgan | 4:56 |
| 5. | "Love Changes" (featuring Kashif) | Skip Scarborough | Kashif | 4:45 |
| 6. | "Think It Over" | Alex Brown; Brian Morgan; M. Morgan | B. Morgan; Shelly Morgan | 4:11 |
| 7. | "I'll Love No More" | L. Wilson; M. Morgan | L. Wilson; M. Morgan | 6:03 |
| 8. | "I Still Think About You" | L. Wilson; M. Morgan | M. Morgan; L. Wilson | 4:49 |
| 9. | "You're All I Got" | L. Wilson; M. Morgan | L. Wilson; M. Morgan | 6:24 |

== Personnel ==
- Executive producer – Beau Huggins
- Producer – Kashif (tracks: 2, 5, 6), Lesette Wilson (tracks: 3, 4, 7 to 9), Meli'sa Morgan (tracks: 3, 4, 7 to 9), Carl Sturken (tracks: 2), Evan Rogers (tracks:2)

== Charts ==
| Chart (1987) | Peak position |
|---|---|
| US Billboard 200 | 108 |
| US Top R&B/Hip-Hop Albums (Billboard) | 11 |

== Singles ==
| Year | Title | US Pop | US R&B | US Dan | UK |
|---|---|---|---|---|---|
| 1987 | "If You Can Do It: I Can Too!" | — | 2 | 27 | 86 |
| 1987 | "Love Changes" (with Kashif) | — | 2 | — | — |
| 1988 | "Here Comes the Night" | — | 17 | — | — |
| 1988 | "Good Love" | — | — | — | 59 |
