= Tyrone DuBose =

American radio personality

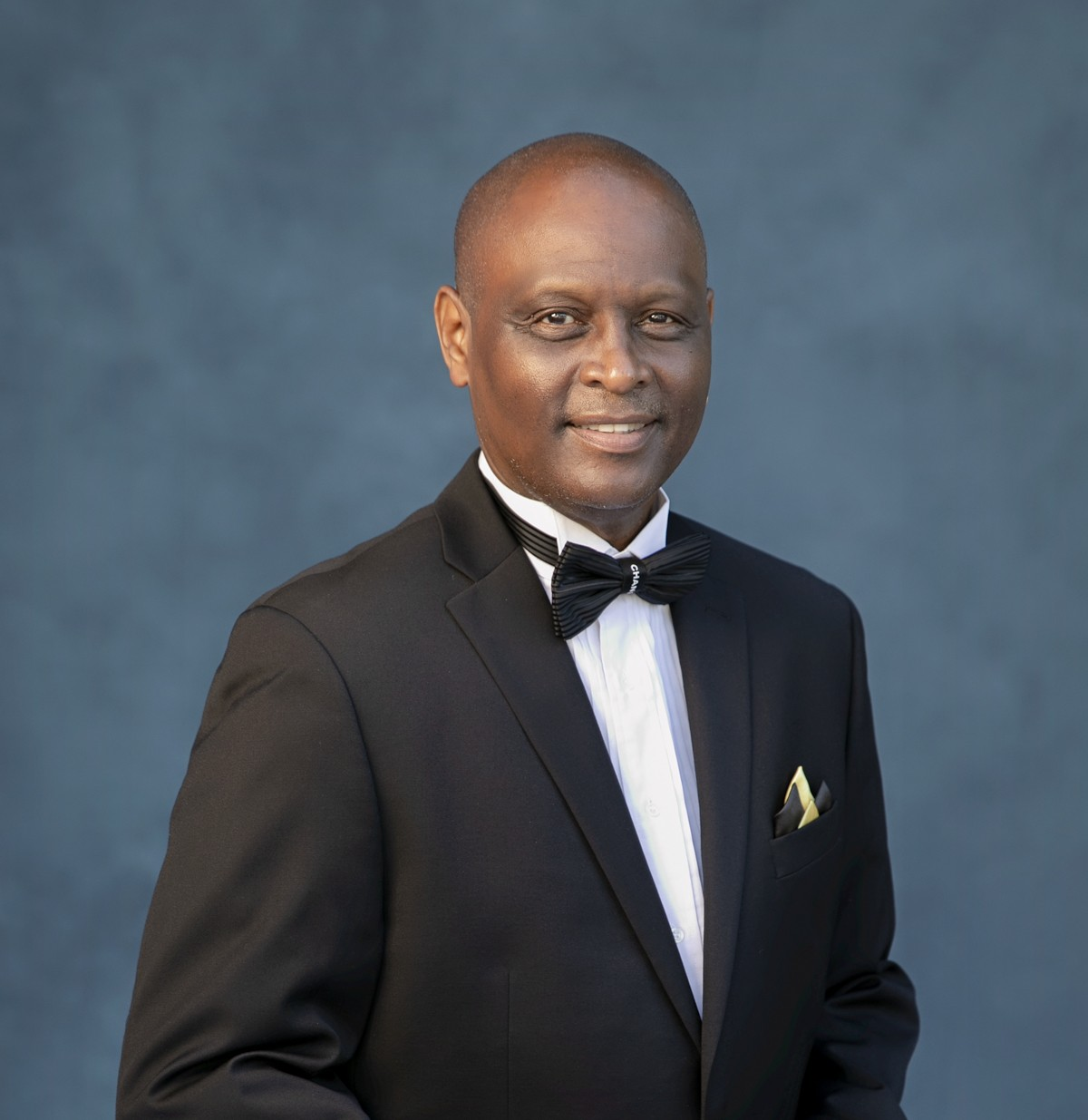
- Born: May 4, 1960 (age 65); Cincinnati, Ohio
- Occupation(s): Radio personality, actor, voice artist, and television contributor

Tyrone DuBose (born May 4, 1960 in Cincinnati, Ohio) is an American radio personality, actor, voice artist, and television contributor.

He is a daily contributor on The Sheryl Underwood Radio Show, and show contributor on the hour-long music documentary program, Unsung, that airs on TV One.

DuBose is a five-time R&B Historian Winner including The Black Music Awards, and received a lifetime achievement award from UVIEW Media Group in Los Angeles California.

== Career ==
DuBose' radio career began in 2003 at KHWY in Barstow, California.

He is a regular contributor to The Sheryl Underwood Radio Show and has provided historical commentary for the Unsung television series on TV One.

In addition to broadcasting, DuBose authored The Four Seasons of R&B, a book chronicling the evolution of rhythm and blues music across decades.

== Recognition ==
In 2024, DuBose was inducted into the California Music Hall of Fame in Temecula, California.He is also a four-time recipient of the Hollywood African Prestigious Award and has been recognized for his contributions to preserving R&B heritage through radio and television.
