= Do Me, Baby =

1982 single by Prince

- US promotional 7" single

Single by Prince

from the album Controversy
- B-side: "Private Joy"
- Released: July 16, 1982
- Recorded: April 1979 (Note: Original version, recorded for inclusion on Prince.); June 1981
- Studio: Alpha (Burbank, California); Hollywood Sound Recorders (Hollywood, California); Sunset Sound Recorders (Hollywood, California)
- Genre: R&B; quiet storm; soul
- Length: 3:57 (7" edit); 4:47 (demo version); 7:47 (album version)
- Label: Warner Bros.
- Songwriter: Prince
- Producer: Prince

Prince singles chronology
"Let's Work" (1982)	"Do Me, Baby" (1982)	"1999" (1982)

"Do Me, Baby" is a 1981 ballad performed by the American singer-songwriter and musician Prince, from his fourth album, Controversy. Although Prince is credited as the sole writer for the song, his former bassist and childhood friend André Cymone claimed to have written it. It was released as the third and final US single from the album. It was later included on his 1993 compilation The Hits/The B-Sides. In 1986, the song was notably covered by R&B singer Meli'sa Morgan. It was featured in one of the opening scenes of the 2007 film Rush Hour 3, with Chris Tucker's character singing along while listening to it on his headphones and simultaneously directing traffic with the dance sequences of Michael Jackson.

In 2021, Prince's estate issued the original version of "Do Me, Baby", initially recorded in April 1979 during sessions for Prince's eponymous second studio album, in celebration of the 40th anniversary of the release of Controversy.

== Track listing ==
1. "Do Me, Baby" (edit) – 3:57
2. "Private Joy" – 4:25

== Personnel ==
Sourced from Benoît Clerc and Guitarcloud.

- Prince – lead and backing vocals, Yamaha CP-70 electric grand piano, ARP Omni, Oberheim OB-X, bass guitar, drums

== Meli'sa Morgan version ==
"Do Me Baby"

Single by Meli'sa Morgan

from the album Do Me Baby
- Released: 1985
- Genre: R&B, soul
- Length: 5:27
- Label: Capitol
- Songwriters: Prince, Andre Cymone
- Producer: Paul Laurence

Meli'sa Morgan singles chronology
"Keep in Touch (Body to Body)" (1982)	"Do Me Baby" (1985)	"Do You Still Love Me?" (1986)

Music video
- "Do Me, Baby" on YouTube

American singer Meli'sa Morgan released a cover of "Do Me, Baby" in November 1985. Her version was a number one hit on the US Hot Black Singles chart, where it spent a total of 24 weeks in 1986. It was also her only entry on the US Hot 100, where it charted for a total of 14 weeks and peaked at number 46.

=== Track listing ===
Vinyl, 12", 45 RPM, Single

Side one
No.	Title	Lyrics	Producer	Length
1.	"Do Me, Baby"	Prince	Paul Laurence	5:27

Side two
No.	Title	Lyrics	Producer	Length
1.	"Do Me, Baby"	Prince	Paul Laurence	4:59

Vinyl, 7", 45 RPM, Single

Side one
No.	Title	Lyrics	Producer	Length
1.	"Do Me, Baby"	Prince	Paul Laurence	3:59

Side two
No.	Title	Lyrics	Producer	Length
1.	"Do Me, Baby"	Prince	Paul Laurence	4:03

=== Credits and personnel ===
- Meli'sa Morgan – vocals
- Production – Paul Laurence
- Recording, mixing – Steve Goldman

=== Charts ===
==== Weekly charts ====
Weekly chart performance for "Do Me Baby" by Meli'sa Morgan
Chart (1986)	Peak position
US Billboard Hot 100	46
US Hot R&B/Hip-Hop Songs (Billboard)	1

==== Year-end charts ====
Year-end chart performance for "Do Me Baby" by Meli'sa Morgan
Chart (1986)	Position
US Hot R&B/Hip-Hop Songs (Billboard)	2

==== Certifications ====
Region	Certification	Certified units/sales
United States (RIAA)	Gold	500,000^{‡}
^{‡} Sales+streaming figures based on certification alone.

== See also ==
- List of number-one R&B singles of 1986 (U.S.)
