= Dyana Williams =

American radio broadcaster

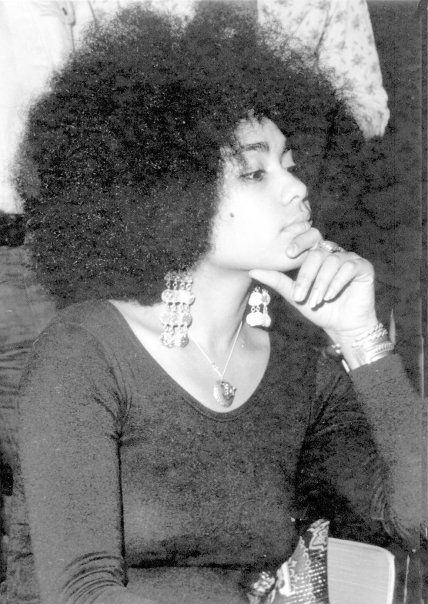
- Williams in the 1970s
- Born: November 9, 1953 (age 72); New York City, U.S.
- Education: Temple University
- Occupations: Radio personality; celebrity media coach; journalist
- Years active: 1970–present

Dyana Williams (born November 9, 1953) is an American radio and music industry professional, journalist, community activist, artist development and media coach, and documentarian, as well as the founder of Influence Entertainment and co-founder of the Pennsylvania-based non-profit advocacy organization, the International Association of African American Music Foundation (IAAAM Foundation).

Williams’ five decades in radio and television include hosting a weekly broadcast, Afternoon Delight, on Radio One's Classix 107.9 and co-hosting Soulful Sunday with Derrick Sampson on Philadelphia’s WRNB. Williams was an entertainment correspondent for Chasing News with Bill Spadea on Fox 5 in New York and My9NJ. Williams appears as a frequent featured commentator in TV One's NAACP Image Award-winning docu-series Unsung.

== Career ==
=== Early years ===
Williams’ professional broadcasting career began in 1973 when radio boss Bob “Nighthawk” Terry invited her to join the staff of Washington, D.C.’s 96.3 WHUR-FM. She honed her on-air style as Ebony Moonbeams, building a following of devoted listeners thanks to her sensuous vocal delivery and stellar musical selections. Two years later, legendary radio icon Frankie Crocker hired Williams at Inner City Broadcasting's 107.5 WBLS-FM in her hometown, New York City. In 1978, she became the first Afro-Latina rock DJ at the ABC FM affiliate, WRQX-FM. Williams made the move to television when she became an arts and culture contributing reporter for P.M. Magazine on CBS affiliate WDVM. After moving to Philadelphia in 1980, Williams established a show called "Love on the Menu" for 105.3 WDAS. Williams also worked as a freelance entertainment reporter for Black Entertainment Television and served as a music consultant for The Soul of VH1, where she interviewed prominent recording artists. Closely associated with "TSOP" (The Sound Of Philadelphia) and Philadelphia's jazz and soul artists, in 1990 she produced and narrated The Philadelphia Music Makers which aired on the Philadelphia PBS outlet WHYY. As a writer, Williams has contributed to The Philadelphia Tribune, Billboard Magazine and The Philadelphia New Observer.

With a lifetime of significant accomplishments to her name, perhaps one of Williams’ most important contributions to American popular culture is her role as co-founder of Black Music Month. In 1979, alongside fellow radio personality Ed Wright and her former husband, legendary songwriter and producer Kenny Gamble, Williams helped create what would become an annual celebration of Black music. The inaugural Black Music Month celebration took place at The White House on June 7, 1979, hosted by then-president and first lady, Jimmy and Rosalind Carter. She took her advocacy for Black music even further, working to designate June as the official Black Music Month and by co-authoring House Concurrent Bill 509, which recognized African American music as a cornerstone of American culture and formally established African American Music Appreciation Month (formerly Black Music Month). Williams is affectionately known as “The Mother of Black Music Month.”

=== Later years ===
In 1990, Williams and Sheila Eldridge launched the Association of African American Music Foundation (IAAAM Foundation) to promote and preserve Black music. Williams co-wrote House Concurrent Bill 509, which recognized African American accomplishments in music and helped established African-American Music Appreciation Month originally started as "Black Music Month". In 1997, Williams earned her B.A. degree in television, radio and film from Temple University, graduating cum laude.

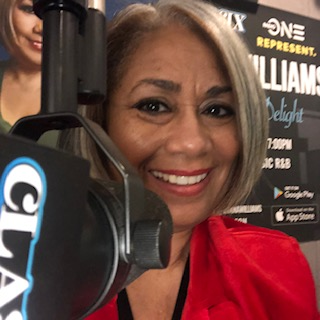
Williams on-air at Classix 107.9

Williams frequently lectures about African-American music and popular culture to universities, colleges, and music conferences throughout the United States and around the world, and has been interviewed by CNN's Anderson Cooper, Tavis Smiley, and Tom Joyner among others. The recipient of numerous awards and recognition, Williams has received citations from: the Commonwealth of Pennsylvania's House of Representative State Senator David P. Richardson, December 9, 1987; a proclamation from Congressman Chaka Fattah, February 11, 2000; a Liberty Bell from Mayor John F. Street, March 18, 2000; City Council City of Philadelphia Citation from Councilman-At-Large, W.Wilson Goode, Jr., November 8, 2003; City of Philadelphia Citation from Mayor John F. Street, May 28, 2003; and was honored with Dyana Williams Day in the City of Philadelphia by Councilwoman Donna Reed Miller and all members of the City Council, November 6, 2008. The Southeastern Pennsylvania March of Dimes presented Williams with the 2006 Achievement in Radio A.I.R Award for the Best Weekend Show in Philadelphia, November 1, 2006. Dyana has been a frequent on-air commentator on the award-winning and highly acclaimed music documentary series, Unsung, on the TV One network, and served as co-executive producer of the Unsung episode featuring R&B superstar Teddy Pendergrass. In 2011, News One listed Williams as #7 on the "Top 20 Black Radio Jockeys of All Time" and RadioFacts.com recognized her as #8 on the "Top 30 Black Women in Media." In 2014, Philadelphia Mayor Michael Nutter presented a proclamation to Williams for her dedication and effort to augment the Philadelphia slogan: The City of Brotherly Love, adding Sisterly Affection, acknowledging the inclusion of women.

Williams is a founding board member of the National Museum of African American Music in Nashville, TN, where she co-leads the museum’s Music Industry Relations Collective. She is a past president of the Philadelphia chapter of the Recording Academy (GRAMMYs) and sits on the board of her alma mater, Temple University’s Klein College of Media and Communication, and is a member of SAG-AFTRA.

== Personal life ==
Williams is a native New Yorker. She is the mother to Caliph Gamble, Isa Salahdeen Gamble, and Princess Idia Gamble from her former union with GRAMMY Award-winning songwriter/producer and Rock and Roll Hall of Fame inductee Kenny Gamble.
