= Meli'sa Morgan =

American singer-songwriter

- Born: Joyce Melissa Morgan; December 6, 1964 (age 61); Queens, New York, U.S.
- Origin: New York City, New York, U.S.
- Genres: R&B; soul; pop
- Occupation: Singer–songwriter
- Instrument: Vocals
- Years active: 1982–present
- Labels: Capitol; Pendulum; Orpheus

Joyce Melissa Morgan (usually spelled Meli'sa; born December 6, 1964) is an American R&B/Soul singer–songwriter. Morgan had a string of urban contemporary hits from the mid–1980s to the mid–1990s. Most notable include her cover version of Prince's "Do Me, Baby", which the single reached RIAA gold certification on July 8, 2025. (1985),"Do You Still Love Me" (1986) and "Still in Love with You" (1992).

== Early life ==
Born in Queens, New York, Morgan got her start in the music industry while singing with a church gospel choir called the Starlets of Corona. Morgan cites Chaka Khan as a major influence.

== Career ==
=== 1982–1992 ===
Her initial chart entry was as the lead singer of the dance group, Shades of Love. They had a single entry at #26 on Billboard magazine's Hot Dance Club Play chart in 1982 with "Body to Body (Keep in Touch)." This was re-popularized in 1994 by new remixes and reached number 1 on the same chart. That same year, music entrepreneur Jacques Fred Petrus asked her to join his newly created studio group, High Fashion, that featured Morgan and two other New York vocalists, Eric McClinton and Alyson Williams. High Fashion's sole hit, "Feelin' Lucky Lately," reached #32 on the US Black Singles chart. In 1983, Morgan left, and was replaced in the group by the jazz vocalist, Marcella Allen. Morgan worked as a backing singer with Chaka Khan, Whitney Houston, and Melba Moore.

As a solo artist, she topped the R&B chart with her cover version of Prince's "Do Me, Baby" for 3 weeks, (the title track from her debut album) which also became her only Billboard Hot 100 entry, peaking at number 46 in 1986., The album was certified gold by the RIAA in May of 2024.. She also had a top 5 R&B single with "Do You Still Love Me" from her debut album. She had several solo hits on the US dance chart as well, including "Still in Love with You," which hit #3 in 1992.

A verse from Morgan's 1986 single "Fool's Paradise" was re-vamped, with modified lyrics, by Mary J. Blige as the chorus to the 1996 Jay-Z single "Can't Knock the Hustle."

=== 2005–present ===
After a lengthy hiatus, Morgan released her fifth solo album, I Remember. The first single, "Back Together Again", a song originally recorded by Roberta Flack and Donny Hathaway, received moderate airplay on urban contemporary radio stations during early 2006 and peaked at number 46 on Billboard's R&B chart. The follow-up singles included "I Remember," "Will You?," and "High Maintenance" which were released in September 2006. New material by Meli'sa Morgan can be heard on a German release by Cool Million, which features Meli'sa Morgan on lead vocals on the opening track "Sweet Baby."

In 2014, Morgan was honored with an Unsung Heroine Award by the National R&B Music Society at Resorts Casino in Atlantic City, NJ.

Morgan was featured on an episode of TVOne's Unsung which aired in 2015.

On May 28, 2024, Morgan scored her first gold album, for the 1986 debut album entitled, "Do Me Baby." It was certified gold by the RIAA for sales reaching over 500,000 units.

On July 8, 2025, Morgan received a RIAA gold certification for her debut single, "Do Me Baby".

== Personal life ==
Morgan was married to playwright, writer, and director Shelly Garrett from 1993 until 1994.

== Discography ==
=== Studio albums ===
List of albums, with selected chart positions
Title	Album details	Peak chart positions		Certifications
Title	Album details	US	US R&B /HH	Certifications
Do Me Baby	Released: 1986; Label: Capitol; Format: LP, CD, cassette	41	4	RIAA: Gold
Good Love	Released: 1987; Label: Capitol; Format: LP, CD, cassette	108	11	
The Lady in Me	Released: 1990; Label: Capitol; Format: LP, CD, cassette	—	—	
Still in Love with You	Released: 1992; Label: Pendulum; Format: LP, CD, cassette	—	38	
I Remember	Released: November 8, 2005; Label: Lu Ann/Orpheus Music; Format: CD, digital download	—	96	
Love Demands	Released: July 13, 2018; Label: Goldenlane; Format: CD, digital download	—	—	
"—" denotes releases that did not chart or were not released in that territory.

=== Compilation albums ===
List of albums, with selected details
Title	Album details
Do You Still Love Me?: The Best of Meli'sa Morgan	Released: June 18, 1996; Label: Razor & Tie; Format: CD

=== Singles ===
List of singles as a group member, with selected chart positions, showing year released
Title	Year	Chart positions		Artist	Album
Title	Year	US R&B /HH	US Dance	Artist	Album
"I'm in the Prime of Love"	1978	—	—	Business Before Pleasure (stylised as B.B.P.)	—N/a
"Feelin' Lucky Lately"	1982	32	—	High Fashion	Feelin' Lucky
"Keep in Touch (Body to Body)"	1982	—	1	Shades of Love	—N/a
"—" denotes releases that did not chart or were not released in that territory.

List of singles as a lead artist, with selected chart positions, sales figures and certifications
Title	Year	Chart positions				Certifications	Album
Title	Year	US	US R&B /HH	US Dance	UK	Certifications	Album
"Do Me Baby"	1985	46	1	—	121	RIAA: Gold	Do Me Baby
"Do You Still Love Me?"	1986	—	5	—	—		Do Me Baby
"Fool's Paradise"	1986	—	24	—	41		Do Me Baby
"Now or Never"	1986	—	—	—	—		Do Me Baby
"Deeper Love"	1987	—	74	—	—		The Golden Child
"If You Can Do It: I Can Too"	1987	—	2	27	86		Good Love
"Love Changes" (with Kashif)	1987	—	2	—	—		Good Love
"Here Comes the Night"	1988	—	17	—	—		Good Love
"Good Love"	1988	—	—	—	59		Good Love
"Can You Give Me What I Want"	1990	—	33	—	—		The Lady in Me
"Don't You Know"	1990	—	—	—	—		The Lady in Me
"Still in Love with You"	1992	—	9	3	—		Still in Love with You
"Through the Tears"	1992	—	18	—	—		Still in Love with You
"I'm Gonna Be Your Lover (Tonight)"	1992	—	68	—	—		Still in Love with You
"Tell Me (How It Feels)" (with Mike Stevens)	1995	—	—	—	— (Note: "Tell Me (How It Feels)" did not enter the UK Singles Chart, but peaked at number 39 on the UK R&B Singles Chart.)		Joy
"Searchin'" (with Mike Stevens)	1996	—	—	—	—		Joy
"Believe In Yourself" (with Soul Switch)	1999	—	—	—	—		—N/a
"How" (with JT Taylor)	2000	—	82	—	—		A Brand New Me
"Don't Say Love" (with Soul Switch)	2003	—	—	—	—		—N/a
"Back Together Again" (with Freddie Jackson)	2005	—	46	—	—		I Remember
"I Remember..."	2006	—	86	—	—		I Remember
"Sweet Baby" (with Cool Million)	2015	—	—	—	—		—N/a
"So Good"	2015	—	—	—	—		—N/a
"Footprints of an Angel"	2022	—	—	—	—		TBA
"—" denotes releases that did not chart or were not released in that territory.

== See also ==
- List of number-one dance hits (United States)
- List of artists who reached number one on the US Dance chart
