= James Grear =

American gospel musician (born 1962)

- Born: James Thomas Grear; June 5, 1962 (age 64); Gary, Indiana
- Origin: Minneapolis, Minnesota
- Genres: Gospel, traditional black gospel, urban contemporary gospel
- Occupations: Singer, songwriter
- Instruments: Vocals, singer-songwriter
- Years active: 1998–present
- Labels: Born Again, Diamante, Liquid 8, Alliant, Habakkuk, Echo Park
- Website: facebook.com/JamesGrear

James Thomas Grear (born June 5, 1962) is an American gospel musician. He started his music career, in 1998, with Company that are based out of Minneapolis, Minnesota. He has released eight albums, with three of them charting on the Billboard magazine Gospel Albums chart. He has released albums with a few labels, such as the following: Born Again Records, Diamante Records, Liquid 8 Records, Alliant Music Group, Habakkuk Music, Echo Park Records.

== Early life ==
Grear was born James Thomas Grear, in Gary, Indiana on June 5, 1962, and was raised as a member of The Church of God in Christ by his parents.

== Music career ==
His music recording career began in 1998, and he has released eight albums with a myriad of labels, which are the following: Born Again Records, Diamante Records, Liquid 8 Records, Alliant Music Group, Habakkuk Music, Echo Park Records. He had three albums place on the Billboard magazine Gospel Albums chart, with one placing on the R&B Albums chart. The three that charted on the Gospel Albums chart were 1998's Don't Give Up at No. 8, 2001's What Will Your Life Say at No. 14, and A Special Place in 2004 at No. 18. The album Don't Give Up, also charted on the R&B Albums chart at No. 34. He released It's My Season on May 5, 2015, by Universal Records alongside EchoPark JDI Records.

== Discography ==
List of selected studio albums, with selected chart positions
Title	Album details	Peak chart positions
Title	Album details	US Gos
Don't Give Up	Released: March 24, 1998; Label: Born Again; CD, digital download	8
What Will Your Life Say	Released: July 31, 2001; Label: Diamante; CD, digital download	14
A Special Place	Released: June 22, 2004; Label: Liquid 8; CD, digital download	18
