= Still in Love with You (album) =

Studio album by Meli'sa Morgan
- Released: April 14, 1992
- Genre: R&B; soul
- Length: 46:47
- Label: Pendulum; Elektra
- Producer: Attala Zane Giles; Michael O'Hara; Ray Watkins; Bernard Belle; Timmy Allen; Meli'sa Morgan

Meli'sa Morgan chronology
The Lady in Me (1990)	Still in Love with You (1992)	Do You Still Love Me?: The Best of Meli'sa Morgan (1996)

Singles from Still in Love with You
- 1. "Still in Love with You" Released: February 16, 1992; 2. "Through the Tears" Released: June 21, 1992

Still in Love with You is a 1992 album by American recording artist Meli'sa Morgan, released under Pendulum Records. The album features her cover of Al Green's "I'm Still in Love with You", which peaked at #9, followed by the second single "Through the Tears", a top 20 hit on the Billboard R&B Singles chart. Following its release, the album was a modest hit and reached the top 40 on the Billboard Top R&B Albums chart.

== Track listing ==
No.	Title	Writer(s)	Length
1.	"Still in Love with You"	Al Green; Al Jackson Jr.; Willie Mitchell	6:04
2.	"Bring You Joy"	Attala Zane Giles; Meli'sa Morgan	4:39
3.	"Never Had a Love Like This"	Morgan; Timmy Allen	4:42
4.	"Can't Wait"	Denise Rich; Morgan; Michael O'Hara	3:42
5.	"Through the Tears"	Giles; Morgan	4:55
6.	"I'm Gonna Be Your Lover (Tonight)"	Roz Davis; Allen	5:09
7.	"Let's Be Real"	Rich; Morgan; O'Hara	4:30
8.	"Release Me"	Rich; Morgan; O'Hara	4:10
9.	"Now I Have Someone"	Dale DeGroat; Shirley Murdock	4:22
10.	"What Change Have You Made Lately?"	Rich; Morgan; O'Hara	4:34

== Credits ==
- Co-producer [Additional Production], Mixed By [Additional] – Masters At Work (track 1)
- Co-producer – Meli'sa Morgan (tracks: 2 to 10)
- Producer – Attala Zane Giles (tracks: 2, 5, 9), Michael O'Hara (tracks: 4, 7, 8, 10)
- Backing vocals - Genobia Jeter-Jones (track: 1, 7), Karen Anderson (tracks: 3, 4, 6, 8), Don Hamilton (tracks: 4, 10), Bernard Belle (track 1)
  Sandra Williams (track 7), Kevin Dorsey (track 5), Anthony Evans (track 10), Michael O'Hara (tracks: 4, 7, 10), Meli'sa Morgan (tracks: 2, 5, 7, 8, 10)

Credits taken from original album liner notes.

== Charts ==
Chart (1992)	Peak position
US Billboard Top R&B/Hip-Hop Albums	38

== Singles ==
Year	Title	US Pop	US R&B	US Dan
1992	"Still in Love with You"	—	9	3
1992	"Through the Tears"	—	18	—
