= Hosh Gureli =

Hosh Gureli (born September 11, 1961) is a music executive and management partner at Primary Wave Music, overseeing their Electronic Music Department.

== Career ==
Hosh Gureli grew up in Middletown, New York. At age 16, he began his career in music as a record clerk for Record World. After a year at Syracuse University, Gureli transferred to Emerson College in Boston. In 1982, Hosh created and hosted WERS’s Boston Mastermix program.

After college, Gureli remained in Boston throughout the mid-1980s. During this time, he worked as a DJ in Boston at several of city's clubs. His work eventually led to an internship at popular music station, Kiss 108, in 1987 under the leadership of program director, Sunny Joe White, and music director, Jerry McKenna. It was during this time that he met up with the program director of KMEL, Keith Naftaly, at a radio conference. Several months later in 1988, Naftaly appointed Gureli as the music director of the San Francisco radio station. Together, Naftaly and Gureli spread a newly engineered rhythm-crossover format, with a heavy blend of urban, hip hop, pop and dance records. Additionally, Gureli created and hosted KMEL Underground, a mixshow featuring a myriad of EDM acts.

In 1993, Gureli was recruited by Clive Davis as a senior director of A&R at Arista Records. Later, he became the Vice President of A&R at J Records / RCA Music Group. Coinciding with his time working with Clive, Gureli continued work in underground mix shows spinning for New York’s Hot 97 in 1993.

In the 90's, Gureli also produced a number of remixes for larger acts like Toni Braxton's "Un-Break My Heart" and Whitney Houston’s “It’s Not Right…But It’s Ok". He continued his work into the next decade.

== A&R Discography ==
Artist	Album	Year	Label
Various Artists	The D&D Project	1995	Arista Street
Deborah Cox	Things Just Ain't The Same - The Dance Mixes	1997	Arista
Deborah Cox	Nobody's Supposed To Be Here (The Dance Mixes)	1998	Arista
Lisa Stansfield	The #1 Remixes (EP)	1998	Arista
Gigi D'Agostino	I'll Fly With You (L'Amour Toujours) (Mixshow Mixes)	2000	Arista
Whitney Houston	The Unreleased Mixes	2000	Arista
Alicia Keys	Diary (Hani Remixes)	2004	J Records
Kelly Clarkson	Since U Been Gone (Remixes)	2005	RCA
Christina Aguilera	Ain't No Other Man (Remixes)	2006	RCA
Swedish House Mafia	Leave The World Behind	2009	Ultra
