= Freddie Jackson discography =

This is the discography documenting albums and singles released by American R&B/soul singer Freddie Jackson.

== Albums ==
=== Studio albums ===
List of studio albums, with selected chart positions, sales figures and certifications
| Title | Details | Peak chart positions | | | Certifications |
| Title | Details | US | US R&B | UK | Certifications |
|---|---|---|---|---|---|
| Rock Me Tonight | Released: April 28, 1985; Label: Capitol; Formats: CD, LP, cassette | 10 | 1 | 27 | RIAA: Platinum; BPI: Silver |
| Just Like the First Time | Released: November 6, 1986; Label: Capitol; Formats: CD, LP, cassette | 23 | 1 | 30 | RIAA: Platinum |
| Don't Let Love Slip Away | Released: July 29, 1988; Label: Capitol; Formats: CD, LP, cassette | 48 | 1 | 24 | RIAA: Gold |
| Do Me Again | Released: October 29, 1990; Label: Capitol; Formats: CD, LP, cassette | 59 | 1 | 48 | RIAA: Gold |
| Time for Love | Released: August 3, 1992; Label: Capitol; Formats: CD, LP, cassette | 83 | 7 | — | |
| Here It Is | Released: January 18, 1994; Label: RCA; Formats: CD, LP, cassette | 66 | 11 | — | |
| At Christmas | Released: October 25, 1994; Label: RCA; Formats: CD, LP, cassette | — | 65 | — | |
| Private Party | Released: February 28, 1995; Label: Street Life / Scotti Bros.; Formats: CD, LP, cassette | 187 | 28 | — | |
| Life After 30 | Released: September 14, 1999; Label: Orpheus; Formats: CD, LP, cassette | — | 81 | — | |
| It's Your Move | Released: February 24, 2004; Label: Orpheus; Formats: CD, LP, digital download | — | 45 | — | |
| Personal Reflections | Released: November 1, 2005; Label: Artemis Records; Formats: CD, LP, digital download | — | — | — | |
| Transitions | Released: September 26, 2006; Label: Orpheus Records; Formats: CD, LP, digital download | — | 26 | — | |
| For You | Released: November 16, 2010; Label: eOne; Formats: CD, LP, digital download | — | 48 | — | |
| Love Signals | Released: June 4, 2018; Label: Climax Entertainment; Formats: CD, LP, digital download | — | — | — | |
| My First Love | Released: December 5, 2023; Label: Climax Entertainment; Formats: CD, digital download | — | — | — | |
"—" denotes the album failed to chart or was not certified

=== Compilation albums ===
List of studio albums, with selected chart positions, sales figures and certifications
| Title | Details | Peak chart positions |
| Title | Details | US R&B |
|---|---|---|
| The Greatest Hits of Freddie Jackson | Released: October 5, 1993; Label: Capitol; Formats: CD, LP, cassette | 45 |
| Anthology | Released: June 2, 1998; Label: Capitol; Formats: CD, LP, cassette | — |
| Greatest Hits | Released: February 6, 2007; Label: Capitol; Formats: CD, LP, digital download | 86 |
| Diamond Collection | Released: October 22, 2008; Label: Orpheus; Formats: CD, LP, digital download | 40 |
"—" denotes the album failed to chart

=== Live albums ===
List of studio albums, with selected chart positions, sales figures and certifications
| Title | Details | Peak chart positions |
| Title | Details | US R&B |
|---|---|---|
| Live in Concert | Released: October 10, 2000; Label: Orpheus; Formats: CD, LP, cassette | — |
"—" denotes the album failed to chart

== Singles ==
| Year | Single | Chart positions | | | | Album |
| Year | Single | US | US R&B | US A/C | UK | Album |
|---|---|---|---|---|---|---|
| 1982 | "Mr. Magician" (with Mystic Merlin) | — | — | — | — | Full Moon |
| 1985 | "Rock Me Tonight (For Old Times Sake)" | 18 | 1 | — | 18 | Rock Me Tonight |
| 1985 | "You Are My Lady" | 12 | 1 | 3 | 49 | Rock Me Tonight |
| 1985 | "She's Not a Sleaze" (with Paul Laurence and Lillo Thomas) | — | 50 | — | 121 | Haven't You Heard |
| 1985 | "He'll Never Love You (Like I Do)" | 25 | 8 | 28 | 81 | Rock Me Tonight |
| 1986 | "Love Is Just a Touch Away" | — | 9 | — | — | Rock Me Tonight |
| 1986 | "A Little Bit More" (with Melba Moore) | — | 1 | — | 96 | Just Like the First Time |
| 1986 | "Tasty Love" | 41 | 1 | — | 73 | Just Like the First Time |
| 1986 | "Have You Ever Loved Somebody" | 69 | 1 | — | 33 | Just Like the First Time |
| 1987 | "I Don't Want to Lose Your Love" | — | 2 | — | — | Just Like the First Time |
| 1987 | "Jam Tonight" | 32 | 1 | — | 81 | Just Like the First Time |
| 1987 | "Look Around" | — | 69 | — | — | Just Like the First Time |
| 1988 | "Nice 'N' Slow" | 61 | 1 | — | 56 | Don't Let Love Slip Away |
| 1988 | "Hey Lover" | — | 1 | — | — | Don't Let Love Slip Away |
| 1989 | "You and I Got a Thang" | — | 5 | — | — | Don't Let Love Slip Away |
| 1989 | "Crazy (For Me)" | — | 17 | — | 41 | Don't Let Love Slip Away |
| 1989 | "I Do" (with Natalie Cole) | — | 7 | 15 | — | Good to Be Back |
| 1990 | "All Over You" | — | 4 | — | — | Do Me Again |
| 1990 | "Love Me Down" | — | 1 | — | 95 | Do Me Again |
| 1991 | "Do Me Again" | — | 1 | — | — | Do Me Again |
| 1991 | "Main Course" | — | 2 | — | — | Do Me Again |
| 1991 | "Second Time for Love" | — | 81 | — | — | Do Me Again |
| 1992 | "I Could Use a Little Love (Right Now)" | — | 2 | — | — | Time for Love |
| 1992 | "Can I Touch You" | — | 30 | — | — | Time for Love |
| 1992 | "Me and Mrs. Jones" | — | 32 | — | 32 | Time for Love |
| 1993 | "Make Love Easy" | — | 22 | — | 70 | Here It Is |
| 1994 | "Was It Something" (featuring Shanice Wilson) | — | 60 | — | — | Here It Is |
| 1994 | "Come Home II U" (featuring Gerald Levert) | — | 94 | — | — | Here It Is |
| 1995 | "Rub Up Against You" | — | 25 | — | — | Private Party |
| 1995 | "(I Want To) Thank You" | — | 63 | — | — | Private Party |
| 1999 | "Do You Wanna" (featuring Shawn Waters) | — | 77 | — | — | Life After 30 |
| 2004 | "Let Me Know" | — | — | — | — | It's Your Move |
| 2005 | "Back Together Again" (with Meli'sa Morgan) | — | 46 | — | — | Personal Reflections |
| 2006 | "Until the End of Time" | — | 44 | — | — | Transitions |
| 2007 | "More Than Friends" | — | 65 | — | — | Transitions |
| 2010 | "I Don't Wanna Go" | — | 69 | 17 | — | For You |
| 2014 | "Love & Satisfaction" | — | — | — | — | non-album release |
| 2017 | "One Night" | — | — | — | — | Love Signals |
| 2018 | "Without You" | — | — | — | — | Love Signals |
| 2019 | "A Million Ways" | — | — | — | — | non-album release |
| 2020 | "Why" | — | — | — | — | My First Love |
"—" denotes the single failed to chart
