= One Wish: The Holiday Album =

Studio album by Whitney Houston
- Released: November 18, 2003
- Recorded: 1996; 2003
- Studios: Tree Sound Studios (Atlanta); Doppler Studios (Atlanta); Leapyear Studio (Los Angeles); Tonysound (Van Nuys); Signet Sound Studios (Hollywood); East Bay Music (Westchester); Avatar Studios (New York); PatchWerk Recording Studios (Atlanta); Silent Sound Studios (Atlanta); Westlake Recording Studios (Los Angeles); Capitol Studios (Los Angeles); Crossway Studios (Mendham); Greater Rising Star Church (Atlanta)
- Genres: Christmas; soul; R&B
- Length: 43:15
- Label: Arista
- Producers: Whitney Houston; Gordon Chambers; Barry Eastmond; Troy Taylor; Mervyn Warren

Whitney Houston chronology
Just Whitney (2002)	One Wish: The Holiday Album (2003)	The Ultimate Collection (2007)

One Wish: The Holiday Album is the only Christmas album and sixth studio album by American singer Whitney Houston. It was released by Arista Records on November 18, 2003. Chiefly produced by Mervyn Warren, along with additional production from Troy Taylor, Gordon Chambers and Barry Eastmond, One Wish combined traditional and contemporary holiday favorites with several new compositions, also featuring a duet with Houston's daughter Bobbi Kristina Brown. The album also includes "Joy to the World" and "Who Would Imagine a King", both of which first appeared on The Preacher's Wife soundtrack (1996).

The album earned a mixed reception by music critics, many of whom praised the production but were divided upon Houston's vocal performance. Upon its release, One Wish debuted at number 49 on the US Billboard 200, and at number 14 on Billboard's Top R&B/Hip-Hop Albums chart. Its first and only single, a rendition of Freddie Jackson's "One Wish (for Christmas)", reached the top twenty on Billboard's US Adult Contemporary chart. In January 2018, the album achieved a gold certification by the Recording Industry Association of America (RIAA) for shipping half a million copies, making Houston one of a few artists to have all of their albums in their lifetime get certified in the United States. The album sold over 2 million copies worldwide.

== Background ==
In 2002, Houston released Just Whitney, her fifth studio album and first under a new $100 million Arista Records contract. Released on November 27, the album marked her first studio project without longtime mentor Clive Davis and reflected a more personal, R&B-oriented direction, with themes of resilience, independence, relationships, and media scrutiny. Yet, despite debuting at number nine on the US Billboard 200 with 205,000 first-week sales, a record for Houston during the SoundScan era, Just Whitney fell far short of the extraordinary commercial success of Houston’s previous albums and singles. Its first two singles, "Whatchulookinat" and "One of Those Days," failed to make a significant impact on the mainstream charts, with "Whatchulookinat" receiving limited US promotion following a lukewarm radio response. Although the album’s singles found greater success on the R&B and dance charts, Just Whitney sold approximately 2.5 million copies worldwide.

In July 2003, Houston was reported to be recording her first-ever Christmas album, her second studio release under her renewed Arista contract, with Mervyn Warren, the main producer of The Preacher's Wife soundtrack, at the helm. By October, the album was officially announced as One Wish: The Holiday Album, with a November 18, 2003 release date, featuring additional contribution from songwriters and producers Troy Taylor, Gordon Chambers and Barry J. Eastmond. Houston also took a more active role in the project, contributing vocal arrangements and co-producing several tracks. Notably, the album featured her daughter, Bobbi Kristina Brown, who joined her on a rendition of "Little Drummer Boy." Explaining her motivation for the project, Houston said she had "wanted to do an album of holiday songs for some time," adding that she considered the songs among the most beautiful ever written and hoped they would appeal to everyone.

== Promotion ==
In support of the album, Arista Records released Houston's rendition of Freddie Jackson's song "One Wish (for Christmas)" as a promotional single. Produced by Gordon Chambers and Barry Eastmond, both of whom had also overseen production on Jackson's 1994 original, it reached the top twenty on Billboard's US Adult Contemporary chart in 2004. Houston also recorded a performance video for a shortened version of her cover of "Cantique de Noël (O Holy Night)," which served as an album commercial. A lyric video for "One Wish (for Christmas)," created by filmmaker Katia Temkin showcasing performance footage as well as the song’s lyrics, was released by the catalog division of Sony Music Entertainment on December 11, 2020. On December 17, 2022, a lyric video for "The First Noël" was released.

The album's songs gained renewed visibility years later as Houston’s holiday catalog experienced a resurgence. "One Wish (for Christmas)" made the Billboard gospel charts in January 2021, peaking at number 13 on its Gospel Digital Song Sales chart. “Cantique de Noël (O Holy Night)” first entered the Gospel Streaming Songs chart in January 2014, peaking at number five, while “The First Noël” reached number 99 on the Billboard Holiday 100 in December 2017 and later climbed to number 12 on the Gospel Digital Song Sales chart and number one on the Gospel Streaming Songs chart, where it spent five weeks at the top. “Little Drummer Boy” reached number 12 on the latter chart in January 2018.

== Critical reception ==
Professional ratings
Review scores
Source	Rating
AllMusic	3/5 stars
Atlanta Journal-Constitution	B–
Los Angeles Times	1.5/5 stars
Slant	3/5 stars
Vancouver Sun	2/5 stars

New York Daily News editor David Hinckley felt that One Wish "reminds us why we liked her so much in the first place: her voice, for which holiday songs are a splendid vehicle." He noted "there's some elaborate production behind songs like "Joy to the World" and "O Come, O Come Emanuel," but also a stocking-full of lovely singing." AllMusic editor Stephen Thomas Erlewine remarked that "holiday records are the last place anybody would want to take a risk, since they're designed to be nice, pleasant mood music and, apart from a rather horrid version of "Little Drummer Boy" [..] this suits the bill nicely. The clean, pristine production, heavy on synths, sounds as if it was cut in the late '80s, yet it's also strangely spare, often being no more than a synth and a drum machine. Still, it's a sound that's well suited for Whitney and her thoroughly predictable set of material." Moscow-Pullman Daily News wrote that Houston's "voice [...] dazzles on [the album] [...] as she soulfully interprets holiday classics. Her voice – though at times a bit raspy – captivates on every track." New York Times critic Jones Pareles noted the "lavish swoops, the sultry whispers, the gospelly asides and the meteoric crescendos" from Houston.

Richard Harrington from The Washington Post found that the "album feels like a contractual obligation-slash-holding action" and was "not particularly memorable." Caroline Sullivan, writing for The Guardian, noted that "stuff like this is so piddling for her that [Houston] seems to have zoned out halfway through. Why put any elbow grease into the "project" when all she need do is set her larynx to "reverent," then doze off? Saying that, she gives "Have Yourself a Merry Little Christmas" some a cappella welly, and the cocktail doo-wop of "O Come, O Come, Emmanuel" is quite irresistible. Still, this is the Voice at its numbest." Slant critic Sal Cinquemani found that "one can't help but think that One Wish: The Holiday Album is nothing more than damage control [...] Houston's voice just isn’t what it used to be – she warbles her way through an otherwise understated version of the contemporary classic [...] and sings 'Tiny little tots with their eyes all aglow/Will find it hard to sleep tonight' on Mel Tormé's "The Christmas Song" like she wants to eat them." Rolling Stone described the album as a "lamentable Christmas collection." In 2014, Los Angeles Times critic Randy Lewis included One Wish on his listing of the "12 of the worst holiday albums of the last 20 years." He noted that "for this set, Houston seemed intent on shoehorning more notes into each syllable than Mariah Carey, resulting in an orgy of melismatics that often obliterates the spirit of these holiday tunes." In 2023, the website Black America Web ranked the album the 18th best black Christmas album of all time.

== Commercial performance ==
One Wish: The Holiday Album initially failed to soar commercially, continuing the downward trajectory of Houston's previous album Just Whitney (2002), but despite its slow start, it experienced a resurgence in the years that followed and gradually established itself as a lasting holiday title in Houston's catalog. In 2002, it debuted and peaked at number 49 on the US Billboard 200, the lowest chart position of her albums during her lifetime and her only album to miss the top 40 of the Billboard 200. On Billboard's component charts, it reached number 14 on Billboard's Top R&B/Hip-Hop Albums, becoming the first and only album in her career to miss the top ten there. It was more successful on the Top Holiday Albums chart, where it peaked at number five and would spend 30 cumulative weeks on the chart; on the two former charts, it spent 13 and 6 weeks respectively on those charts.

In December 2012, the album returned to the Billboard 200 during the Christmas season following Houston's death early that February. In January 2018, One Wish achieved a gold certification by the Recording Industry Association of America (RIAA) for domestic shipments figures in excess of 500,000 units, making Houston one of a very few artists to have all of their lifetime albums receive an RIAA certification in the United States. In 2021, the album was re-released as a deluxe-edition vinyl LP and featured her posthumous Billboard AC hit duet with Pentatonix, on a remade version of Houston's 1987 Christmas hit, "Do You Hear What I Hear?", which later was certified gold by the RIAA in January 2023.. According to Spotify, the album has accumulated more than 107 million streams.

== Track listing ==
One Wish: The Holiday Album track listing
No.	Title	Writer(s)	Length
1.	"The First Noël"	Traditional	3:14
2.	"The Christmas Song (Chestnuts Roasting on an Open Fire)"	Mel Tormé; Robert Wells	3:12
3.	"Little Drummer Boy" (featuring Bobbi Kristina Brown)	Katherine Davis; Henry Onorati; Harry Simeone	4:29
4.	"One Wish (For Christmas)"	Gordon Chambers; Barry Eastmond; Freddie Jackson	4:12
5.	"Cantique de Noël (O Holy Night)"	Traditional	3:48
6.	"I'll Be Home for Christmas"	Kim Gannon; Walter Kent; Buck Ram	3:45
7.	"Deck the Halls"/"Silent Night"	Traditional	4:29
8.	"Have Yourself a Merry Little Christmas"	Ralph Blane; Hugh Martin	4:49
9.	"O come, O come, Emmanuel"	Traditional	3:06
10.	"Who Would Imagine a King" (featuring The Nativity Choir)	Mervyn Warren; Hallerin Hilton Hill	3:30
11.	"Joy to the World" (with The Georgia Mass Choir)	Traditional	4:41
Total length:			43:15

2021 vinyl and digital deluxe edition bonus track
No.	Title	Writer(s)	Producer(s)	Length
12.	"Do You Hear What I Hear?" (with Pentatonix)	Gloria Shayne; Noël Regney	Ben Bram; PTX	3:14

== Personnel ==
Credits adapted from AllMusic.

- Joey Arbagey – A&R
- Julien Barber – viola
- Ray Bardani – mixing
- Sandra Billingslea – violin
- Ralph Blane –
- Edie Lehmann Boddicker – background vocals
- Joseph Bongiorno – upright bass
- Alfred Brown – viola
- Ray Brown Trio – primary artist
- Carmen Carter – background vocals
- Gordon Chambers – producer, vocal arrangement, background vocals
- Bernard Davis – drums
- John Dexter – viola
- Sante d'Orazio – photography
- Earl Dumler – oboe
- Barry J. Eastmond – conductor, engineer, keyboards, producer, string arrangements
- Max Ellen – violin
- Steve Fisher – assistant
- Roxanna Floy – make-Up
- Scott Frankfurt – drum programming, percussion programming
- Ian Freebairn-Smith – background vocals
- Roger Freeland – background vocals
- Michelle George – A&R
- Georgia Mass Choir – primary artist
- Sharlotte Gibson – background vocals
- Sandi Hall – background vocals
- Phil Hamilton – acoustic guitar, electric guitar
- Reggie Hamilton – bass
- John Holmes – assistant
- Ashley Horne – violin
- Gary Houston – background vocals
- Whitney Houston – lead vocals, producer, vocal arrangement
- Regis Iandiorio – violin
- Paul Jackson Jr. – guitar
- Ronald Jenkins – bass
- Richard Thomas Jennings – art direction, design
- Bashiri Johnson – percussion
- Thom "TK" Kidd – engineer
- Olivia Koppell – viola
- Gail Kruvand – bass
- David Kutch – mastering
- Ellin La Var – hair stylist
- Leonid Levin – violin
- Jesse Levy – cello
- Ezekiel Lewis – vocal arrangement, background vocals
- Jason Locklin – assistant
- Stephen Mackey – background vocals
- Joseph Magee – engineer
- Margaret Magill – violin
- Phil Magnotti – string engineer
- Nick Marshall – assistant
- Myrna Matthews – background vocals
- Roger Moody – assistant
- Kermit Moore – cello
- Michael Morton – flute
- Jeff Moses – assistant
- Eugene J. Moye – cello
- Jack Odom – assistant
- Zack Odom – assistant
- Dean Parks – guitar
- Carol Pool – violin
- Dave Reitzas – mixing
- Alex Reverberi – assistant
- Marnie Riley – assistant
- Maxine Roach – viola
- Anthony Ruotolo – assistant
- Matthew Schwartz – a&r
- Tony Shepperd – engineer, mixing
- Rob Skipworth – assistant
- Ivy Skoff – production coordination
- Matt Snedecor – assistant
- Timothy Snell – stylist
- Andy Stein – violin
- Katherine LiVolsi Stern – violin
- Sally Stevens – vocal contractor, background vocals
- Marti Sweet – violin
- Gerald Tarack – concert master, violin
- Craig "Niteman" Taylor – assistant
- Troy Taylor – arranger, bass, drums, keyboards, producer, programming, vocal arrangement, background vocals
- Shelene Thomas – background vocals
- Carmen Twillie – background vocals
- Mervyn Warren – arranger, choir arrangement, conductor, drum programming, keyboards, percussion, percussion programming, piano, producer, string arrangements, vocals, background vocals
- Oren Waters – background vocals
- John West – background vocals
- Gerald White – background vocals
- Michael White – engineer
- Belinda Whitney – violin
- Frank Wolf – engineer
- Harry Zaratzian – viola

== Charts ==
2003 chart performance for One Wish: The Holiday Album
Chart (2003)	Peak position
Canadian R&B Albums (Nielsen SoundScan)	29
US Billboard 200	49
US Top R&B/Hip-Hop Albums (Billboard)	14
US Top Holiday Albums (Billboard)	5

2012 chart performance for One Wish: The Holiday Album
Chart (2012)	Peak position
US Billboard 200	90

2021 chart performance for One Wish: The Holiday Album
Chart (2021)	Peak position
Spanish Vinyl Albums (PROMUSICAE)	58

== Certifications ==
Certifications for One Wish: The Holiday Album
Region	Certification	Certified units/sales
United States (RIAA)	Gold	500,000^{^}
^{^} Shipments figures based on certification alone.

== Release history ==
Release dates and formats for One Wish: The Holiday Album
Region	Date	Format(s)	Label	Ref.
United States	November 18, 2003	CD; digital download	Arista	
Various	October 13, 2021	Vinyl	Arista	
