= Try It on My Own =

Single by Whitney Houston

from the album Just Whitney
- Released: February 11, 2003
- Studio: Brandon's Way Recording Studios (Los Angeles, CA)
- Length: 4:39
- Label: Arista
- Songwriters: Babyface; Jason Edmonds; Carole Bayer Sager; Aleese Simmons; Nathan Walton
- Producer: Babyface

Whitney Houston singles chronology
"One of Those Days" (2002)	"Try It on My Own" (2003)	"Love That Man" (2003)

Audio sample
- "Try It on My Own": file; help

Music video
- "Try It On My Own" on YouTube

"Try It on My Own" (titled "On My Own" for its single release) is a song by American recording artist Whitney Houston. It was written by Babyface, Jason Edmonds, Carole Bayer Sager, Aleese Simmons, and Nathan Walton for her fifth studio album Just Whitney (2002), with production handled by the former. A pop ballad that was inspired partly by reports surrounding Houston's personal struggles at the time and conceived as an empowering statement of self-reliance, the song is about overcoming doubts or fears so a person can reach the point in their life where they can "try it on [their] own".

The song became the project's third single and was released on February 11, 2003 by Arista Records. It received acclaim from critics as well as fans; most of them who named it as the album's highlight. Like "Whatchulookinat" and "One of Those Days" before it, "On My Own" was a modest success, topping the Billboard Hot Dance Music/Club Play chart and reaching the top ten on the US Adult Contemporary charts. A music video, directed by David LaChapelle, was released to promote the single. Houston performed "Try It on My Own" on an episode of the television series Boston Public ("Chapter 66"), which first aired in May 2003, and on the 2003 VH1 Divas Duets: An Honors Concert for the VH1 Save the Music Foundation.

== Background ==
"Try It on My Own" was written by Kenneth "Babyface" Edmonds, his nephew Jason Edmonds, Carole Bayer Sager, Aleese Simmons and Nathan Walton and produced by the former for Houston fifth studio album Just Whitney (2002). Having previously worked with Houston, Babyface was approached by L.A. Reid to contribute to the album and subsequently invited Bayer Sager to write a song for Houston. Inspired by the reports surrounding Houston's health and behavior, as well as her temporary separation from Bobby Brown and efforts toward sobriety, Bayer Sager conceived the song as an empowering statement of independence, envisioning it as something Houston might want to sing about herself. She provided Babyface with the title "Try It on My Own," after which he developed the melody and she wrote the lyrics. Babyface subsequently produced the recording, with Bayer Sager later recalling that Houston sounded strong during the session.

== Critical reception ==
Critical reception to "Try It on My Own" was generally positive, with several critics praising Houston's vocal performance and the song's classic ballad style. Billboard called it "the best song on the disc" and described it as "a classic Whitney ballad" featuring "huge celestial notes" and a "creamy orchestral arrangement." Keysha Davis from BBC called it "the most welcomed return" on parent album Just Whitney, describing the melancholic song as "one of the album's highlights." Sean Daly of The Washington Post described "Try It on My Own" as a "slow-building ballad," comparing it favorably to her earlier hits "Didn't We Almost Have It All" and "Where Do Broken Hearts Go." Ernest Hardy of LA Weekly found that the showcased Houston's enduring vocal power. Though dismissing its self-affirming sentiment as "I'mmon luv myself treacle" and "saccharine bullshit," he acknowledged that Houston “"can still belt as powerfully" as any contemporary vocalist.

More mixed assessments focused on the song's conventionality. Entertainment Weekly's Tom Sinclair of Entertainment Weekly characterized it as a "treacly keyboards-and-strings big ballad," while Sal Cinquemani of Slant Magazine described it as "the kind of syrupy ballad responsible for cookie-cutter star-makers like American Idol." David Sinclair of The Times characterized "On My Own" as an "old-school torch song," but considered it "dull and schmaltzy." In his Sunday Times review, Dan Cairns was particularly critical of the song, calling it "the nadir" of Just Whitney. He argued that Houston sounded strained as she attempted notes that had once come effortlessly to her, presenting the song as an example of the vocal decline he perceived across the record. Music Week dismissed "On My Own" as an "uninspired ballad." '

== Chart performance ==
"Try It on My Own" achieved moderate commercial success in the United States, performing strongest on the Adult Contemporary and Dance Club Songs charts. It debuted at number 99 on the Billboard Hot 100 in April 2003 and peaked at number 84, spending 12 weeks on the chart. On the Hot R&B/Hip-Hop Songs chart, it peaked at number 80 in its eighth week dated July 5, 2003 and spent 14 weeks. In its eighth week dated July 5, 2003, it reached its peak of number 80. The song performed better on Billboard'ss Adult Contemporary chart, where it reached number 10, marking Houston's 24th top-ten entry on the chart, and on the Dance Club Songs chart, where it reached number one in the week dated April 12, 2003, staying for a week atop the charts and spending 14 cumulative weeks on the chart. Internationally, the song achieved its highest chart position in Canada, where it peaked at number 24 on the Canadian Singles Chart.

== Music video ==
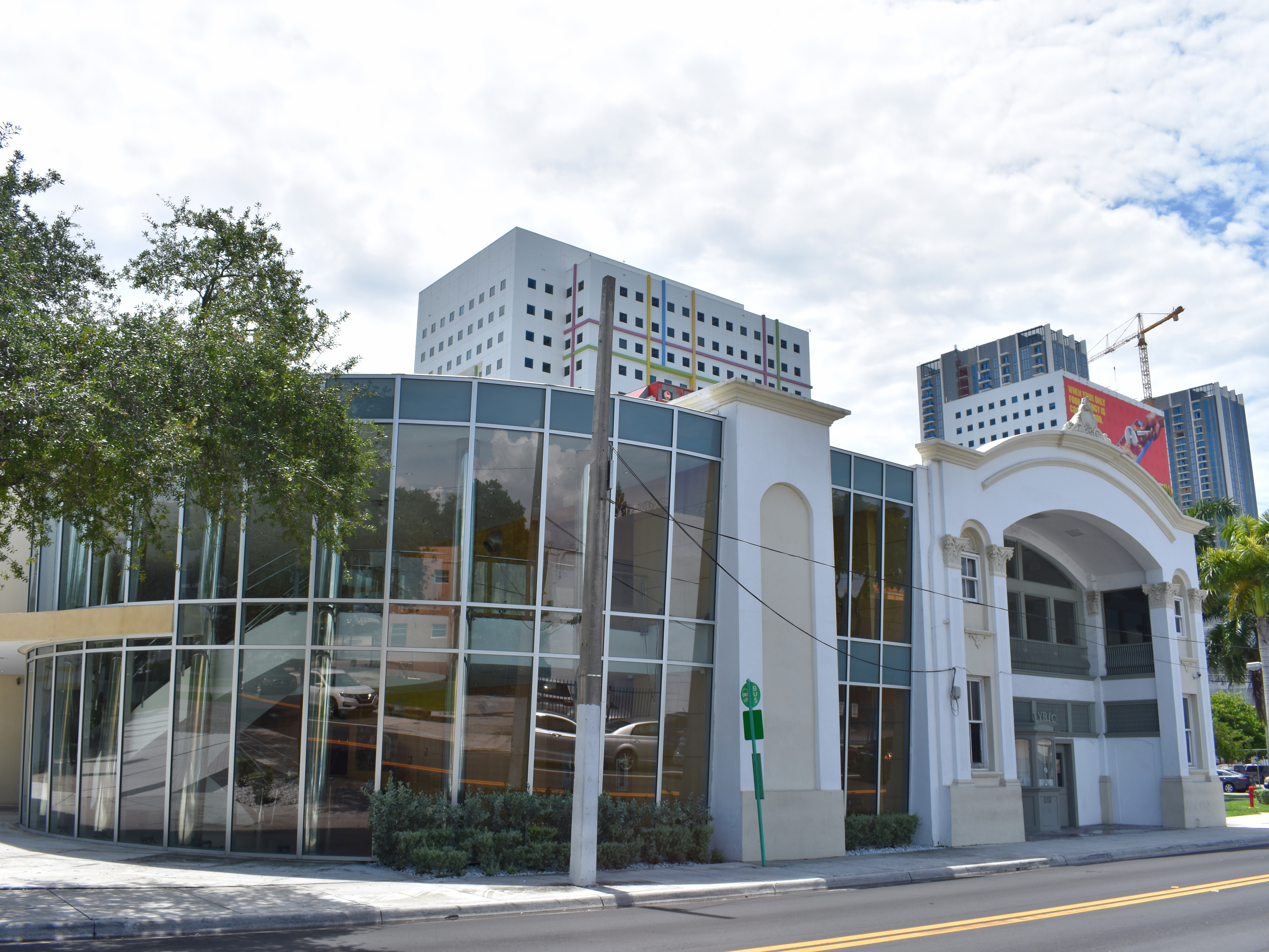
A video for "Try It on My Own" was shot at the Lyric Theater in Miami.

The music video for "Try It on My Own" was directed by David LaChapelle and shot at Overtown's historic Lyric Theater, one of the oldest African American owned theaters in Miami, Florida, in early March 2003. It premiered on BET's countdown format 106 & Park on April 11, 2003. Later released as a DVD single by Arista, also featuring the "One of Those Days" video, it was certified gold for shipments of 25,000 units by the Recording Industry Association of America (RIAA) on September 22, 2003. Bobby Brown makes a cameo at the beginning of the video.

The music video can be interpreted as part of Houston's self-actualization during the late 1990s and early 2000s, when she repudiated the pop queen persona built under Clive Davis during the 1980s. Houston also uses the video, along with the song itself, to respond to criticism from the media and music industry at the time. It opens with music industry insiders waiting for Houston to appear, staring at their watches. As Houston starts singing, the panel is bewildered, holding up lyrics from "Over the Rainbow." This scene parodies her high-profile firing by Burt Bacharach from the 2000 Academy Awards ceremony for not singing "Rainbow" during rehearsals for the show. But she continues to sing "On My Own" as the insiders leave there in frustration due to Houston not following their prescribed formula. The video then cuts to Houston performing with a gospel choir in front of her adoring fans, giving their cheers through.

== Cover versions ==
"Try It on My Own" was performed by Mau Marcelo, winner of Philippine Idol in 2006, as her winning song and debut single. She performed it during both the final performance and results nights, the latter following her victory. The song was also recorded by Sheryn Regis for What I Do Best (2005) and by Canadian Idol contestant Toya Alexis for the show's 2003 compilation album.

== Track listings and formats ==
European CD maxi (82876 510082 3)

1. "On My Own" (radio edit) – 4:28
2. "On My Own" (MaUVe Remix) – 7:53
3. "On My Own" (Maurice's Nu Soul Radio Mix) – 4:23
4. "On My Own" (Pound Boys Radio Mix) – 4:42
5. "On My Own" (Thunderpuss Radio Mix) – 4:41

US remixes vinyl (82876 51973 1)

1. "On My Own" (Club Anthem Mix) – 10:09
2. "On My Own" (MaUVe Club Vocal) – 7:48
3. "On My Own" (Maurice's Nu Soul Mix) – 8:21
4. "On My Own" (Pound Boys Dub) – 7:35
5. "On My Own" (MaUVe Dub) – 6:20

US promo CD (82876 50138 2)

1. "Try It on My Own" (radio edit) – 4:28
2. "Try It on My Own" (Thunderpuss Radio Mix) – 4:40
3. "Try It on My Own" (Thunderpuss Radio Mix Instrumental) – 4:38

UK promo CD (82876 50666 2)

1. "On My Own" (radio edit) – 4:28

US Thunderpuss remixes vinyl/promo (82876 50140 1)

1. "Try It on My Own" (Club Anthem Mix) – 10:09
2. "Try It on My Own" (Tribe-A-Pella) – 7:58

US Mike Rizzo Remix vinyl/Promo (82876 52507 1)

1. "Try It on My Own" (Global Soul Club Mix) – 9:26
2. "Try It on My Own" (Global Soul Club Mix) – 9:26

US Thunderpuss Remixes 12" (82876 50538 1)

1. "Try It on My Own" (Club Anthem Mix) – 10:09
2. "Try It on My Own" (Tribe-A-Pella) – 7:58
3. "Try It on My Own" (Private Invite Mix) – 8:20
4. "Try It on My Own" (ThunderDUB) – 7:48

DVD single (EAN: 0828765115698)

1. "Try It on My Own" (video)
2. "One of Those Days" (video)

Other remixes and versions

- Dave-O Transformer Remix – 4:44
- J.D.'s Polarbabies Radio Edit – 4:35
- Maurice's Nu Soul Mix – 8:21
- Maurice's Nu Soul Radio Mix – 4:23
- Mike Rizzo Global Club Mix – 9:28
- Mike Rizzo Global Radio Mix – 3:58
- Mike Rizzo Global Acappella – 6:43
- MaUVe Club Vocal – 7:43
- MaUVe Dub – 6:18
- Seismic Crew's Vocal Radio Mix – 4:17
- Pound Boys Main Club Mix – 9:05
- Pound Boys Radio Mix – 4:42
- Pound Boys Dub – 7:35
- Thunderpuss Club Anthem Mix – 10:09
- Thunderpuss Private Invite Mix – 8:23
- Thunderpuss Radio Mix – 4:40
- Thunderpuss Radio Instrumental – 4:38
- Thunderpuss Tribe-A-Pella – 7:58
- ThunderDUB – 7:48

== Personnel and credits ==
Credits adapted from album liner notes.

- Whitney Houston: lead vocals
- Kenneth "Babyface" Edmonds: writer, producer, keyboards, drum programming, guitar and background vocals
- Carole Bayer Sager, Jason Edmonds, Aleese Simmons and Nathan Walton: writers
- Kenya Ivey: background vocals
- Ricky Lawson: drums
- Michael Thompson: guitar
- Reggie Hamilton: bass
- Greg Phillinganes: piano
- Wayne Linsey: Rhodes
- Bill Meyers: strings arranger and conductor
- Paul Boutin: recording
- Edward Quesada et Jimmy Hoyson: assistant engineers
- Tommy Vicari: recording (strings)
- Jon Gass: mixing
- Josean Posey: assistant engineer (mixing)
- Ivy Skoff: production coordinator

== Charts ==
=== Weekly charts ===
Chart (2003)	Peak position
Canada (Nielsen SoundScan)	24
Switzerland (Schweizer Hitparade)	79
US Billboard Hot 100	84
US Hot R&B/Hip-Hop Songs (Billboard)	80
US Adult Contemporary (Billboard)	10
US Dance Club Songs (Billboard)	1

=== Year-end charts ===
Chart (2003)	Position
US Dance/Club-Play Singles (Billboard)	37

== Certifications ==
Region	Certification	Certified units/sales
United States (RIAA) Video single	Gold	25,000^{^}
^{^} Shipments figures based on certification alone.

== See also ==
- List of number-one dance singles of 2003 (U.S.)
