= Private Party =

Private Party may refer to:

- Party

== Music ==
- Private Party (album), by Freddie Jackson 1995
- Private Party Collectors Edition, a compilation album of Canadian DJ group, Baby Blue Soundcrew
- Private Party, album by Bobby Nunn (R&B musician)
- Private Party, album by Private (band)
- Private Party EP, by Leona Lewis
- Private Party, compilation album by Johan Gielen
- Private Party November 21, 1948, an archive recording by Lead Belly 2000

=== Songs ===
- Private Party (Klymaxx song), 1990
- "Private Party", song by Freddie Jackson from the album Private Party (album) 1995
- "Private Party", song by Bobby Nunn (R&B musician) 1982
- "Private Party", song by Britt Ekland, Nissenson, Grody & Delia, B-side of Do It To Me 1979
- "Private Party", song by The Comsat Angels from Fiction (The Comsat Angels album) 1982
- "Private Party", song by Leona Lewis
- "Private Party", song by Michelle Williams from Unexpected (Michelle Williams album)
- "Private Party", song by Juicy (band) 1987
- "Private Party", song by Unlimited Touch 1981
- "Private Party", song by Sean Paul from album Imperial Blaze
- "Private Party", song by Dungeonesse
- "Private Party", song by Wally Jump Junior and The Criminal Element Arthur Baker (musician) 1988
- "Private Party", song by Olivia with Soul Diggaz from Barbershop 2: Back in Business (soundtrack)
- "Private Party", song by India Arie from Testimony: Vol. 1, Life & Relationship
- "Private Party", song by Cuban Link from Chain Reaction (Cuban Link album)
- "Private Party", song by Sinjin Hawke
- "Private Party", song by Keo Nozari from Love Boutique
- "Ohhh (Private Party)", song by German pop singer Sarah Connor from Naughty but Nice (album)
- "Private Party (Tu Para Mi)", song by Sheila E from Sex Cymbal (album)

== Other uses ==
- Private Party (professional wrestling), a professional wrestling team consisting of Isiah Kassidy and Marq Quen
