= At Christmas =

At Christmas may refer to:

- At Christmas (Sara Evans album), 2014
- At Christmas (Freddie Jackson album), 1994
- "At Christmas" (song), a 2016 song by Kylie Minogue
- James Taylor at Christmas, a 2006 album by James Taylor
