= For You (Freddie Jackson album) =

Studio album by Freddie Jackson
- Released: November 16, 2010
- Length: 48:06
- Label: eOne
- Producer: Barry Eastmond

Freddie Jackson chronology
Transitions (2006)	For You (2010)	Love Signals (2018)

Singles from For You
- 1. "I Don't Wanna Go" Released: 2010

For You is the thirteenth studio album by American singer Freddie Jackson. It was released by eOne Music on November 16, 2010. His debut with the label, it reached number 48 on the US Top R&B/Hip-Hop Albums chart.

== Critical reception ==
Professional ratings
Review scores
Source	Rating
Allmusic	2/5 stars

In his review for AllMusic, editor Andy Kellman felt that "at times, there is too much of an evidently conscious effort – both sonically and lyrically – to make Jackson sound current. The best moments come during the slower, more sensitive songs, when Jackson is not attempting to keep up with the times. Complemental and background vocalists are so prominent that the album, at times, does not sound like a Freddie Jackson release at all. There just might be enough of him here to satisfy longtime fans who have been waiting six years for new material." Melody Charles from SoulTracks found that "Jackson's latest is a worthy collection of grown-folks' soul that will resonate with his back-in-the-day followers and might even pick up some new ones."

== Track listing ==
All tracks produced by Barry Eastmond.

No.	Title	Writer(s)	Length
1.	"I Don't Wanna Go"	Barry Eastmond; Gary Brown	3:41
2.	"After All This Time"	Eastmond; Billy Cliff; Freddie Jackson	4:10
3.	"A Dozen Roses"	Eastmond; Brown; Mike Clark	3:56
4.	"Incognito"	Eastmond; Jolyon Skinner	3:50
5.	"A Little Taste"	Eastmond; Jackson	3:57
6.	"Say Yeah"	Eastmond; Jackson; Brown	4:30
7.	"For You I Will (Dollie's Song)"	Eastmond	4:00
8.	"Rumors"	Eastmond; Skinner	4:12
9.	"Any Way You Want It"	Eastmond; Brown	3:53
10.	"Definition of Love" (featuring Sara Devine)	Eastmond; Gordon Chambers	3:41
11.	"Slow Dance"	Eastmond; Chambers	4:00
12.	"What's On Your Mind"	Eastmond; Chambers; Brown	4:17

== Charts ==
Chart (2010)	Peak position
US Top R&B/Hip-Hop Albums (Billboard)	48
