= One of Those Days =

2002 single by Whitney Houston

Single by Whitney Houston

from the album Just Whitney
- B-side: "My Love" (featuring Bobby Brown)
- Released: October 29, 2002
- Recorded: February 2002
- Studio: Atlanta Premier Recordings (Atlanta)
- Genre: R&B
- Length: 3:56
- Label: Arista
- Songwriters: Whitney Houston; Kevin Briggs; Dwight Renolds; Patrice Stewart; Ernest Isley; Marvin Isley; Christopher Jasper; Kelly Isley; Ronald Isley; Rudolph Isley
- Producer: Kevin Briggs

Whitney Houston singles chronology
"Whatchulookinat" (2002)	"One of Those Days" (2002)	"Try It on My Own" (2003)

Music video
- "One of Those Days" on YouTube

"One of Those Days" is a song by American singer Whitney Houston, from her fifth studio album Just Whitney (2002). Written by Whitney Houston herself, Kevin Briggs, Dwight Renolds, Patrice Stewart, Ernest Isley, Marvin Isley, Christopher Jasper, Kelly Isley, Ronald Isley, and Rudolph Isley, and produced by Briggs, the song was released as the second single from the album, following the lead single "Whatchulookinat", on October 29, 2002 through Arista Records. A mid-tempo R&B track, "One of Those Days" interpolates The Isley Brothers' song "Between the Sheets" (1983), and its lyrics speak about getting away from the stress of daily life.

The song received generally positive feedback from music critics, who commended Houston's vocals and the song's production and music; the Isley Brothers interpolation received favorable comments from most critics. It peaked at number 72 on the US Billboard Hot 100 and number 29 on the Hot R&B/Hip-Hop Songs chart. It peaked at number six in Hungary, and also made the singles charts at in Australia, the Netherlands, Belgium, and Switzerland. The single's accompanying music video, directed by Kevin Bray, portrays Houston and her girlfriends taking some time out and spending time at a spa and a club. Houston performed "One of Those Days" live on a concert organized at Lincoln Center Plaza, in December 2002. The concert was featured on an episode of Good Morning America.

== Background ==
"One of Those Days" was written by Kevin Briggs, Dwight Reynolds and Patrice Stewart for Whitney Houston's fifth studio album Just Whitney (2002). The Isley Brothers are also credited as writers as the song features an interpolation of their song "Between the Sheets" (1983). In an interview with TMHEntertainment, Reynolds said that the song was not intentionally written for Houston. One day, while Reynolds was at Shek'speare's studio, The Music House, Houston and her husband Bobby Brown visited them. At that time, Shek'speare had a few instrumental tracks put up, and according to Reynolds, "the vibe was set" immediately. Shek'speare and Reynolds started discussing the ideas for the songs; Houston also contributed her views and ideas, and rejected the ones that she felt did not suit her. Shek'speare and Reynolds penned three songs that day, two of which are featured on the album, "One of Those Days" and "Dear John Letter". The song was produced by Briggs and was recorded at Atlanta Premier Recordings, Atlanta, by Ben Briggs III, and was mixed by Kevin "KD" Davis.

== Release ==
The song was released as the second single from the album in many countries, except the United Kingdom, following the under-performance and lackluster response to the lead single "Whatchulookinat". In the US, it was sent to urban, rhythmic and mainstream radios on October 28, 2002. A CD single was released the next day. In Australia, a double A-side CD single containing "One of Those Days" and "Whatchulookinat" was released on November 25, 2002. Arista released CD and CD maxi singles in Belgium on December 11, 2002. The remix featuring Nelly and its instrumental were issued as a CD single in the US. Another remix by Almighty Records, titled "One of Those Days (Almighty Remix)", was made available through the compilation Almighty Downunder, Volume 2.

== Composition ==
"One of Those Days" (2002)
A 25-second sample of "One of Those Days" illustrating the "Between the Sheets" melody sampling. Many critics appreciated the sample's incorporation in the song.

"One of Those Days" is a mid-tempo R&B song with a "slight retro feel" to it. Chuck Taylor of Billboard classified the song as a "groovy, hip-swaying composition". The song's hook samples the melody from The Isley Brothers' 1983 song "Between the Sheets". As Houston begins the first verse, she declares her stress: "This is just for me [...] Got to take time out [...] You don't know what I'm going through." She then sings about getting away from it, by indulging in activities like a manicure, pedicure and by having a "late-night snack, a bubble bathe and a massage". Throughout the song, she sings over a "warm bed of beats and horns". Writing for Entertainment Tonight, Tim Jaramillo commented that the song is a "smoky track with a feel-good, chilled-out vibe". Dan LeRoy of NJ Star Ledger observed that the song sounded like an outtake from Brandy Norwood's debut album, while New York Daily News compared it to Houston's 1999 song "It's Not Right but It's Okay". An official remix of the song features rapped verses from Nelly, which according to MTV News staffs has a reggae feel.

== Critical reception ==
"One of Those Days" received generally positive reviews from music critics. Sean Daly of The Washington Post commented that the song was "likably [sic] bouncy". Craig Seymour of The Atlanta Journal-Constitution called the song a "breezy girls'-night-out" cut. Writer for Blues & Soul wrote that the song "is an excellent slice of soulful mid-beat head nod R&B". They also commended the sampling of "Between the Sheets", noting that it is "effective". Ernest Hardy of LA Weekly had different opinions of the song. Although he deemed it an "underrated single" at first and wrote that it "leaps beyond its work-sucks-the-rent's-late-I-need-a-date griping into the realm of existential letting", he later commented that the song is "grounded in retort". Chuck Taylor of Billboard remarked that the song marks a "triumphant return of one of the great singers, who delivers the goods in glorious voice." He further commented that the production of the song would be able to convince her "pop fans", and also praised the Isley Brothers sampling. Sal Cinquemani of Slant Magazine commented that the song could have been titled "How Whitney Got Her Groove Back". He noted that the "smooth" track allows Houston to offer a restrained delivery of her vocals.

Keysha Davis of BBC Music called the sampling of "Between the Sheets" as "clever". Nakesa Mumbi Moody, of the Associated Press, wrote it was "sexy" and "dreamy". Writing for The Boston Globe, Joan Anderman called it a "breezy" track with a "disturbingly trite" theme. The German newspaper Der Tagesspiegel, in their review for "One of Those Days" called the song "schmaltzy" and wrote that it could have been done in the 1980s. Jimmy Draper of San Francisco Bay Guardian noted that "the song seems so anticlimactic in comparison to the real-life pot". Jon Caramanica of Rolling Stone called the track "creaky and unconvincing". Entertainment Weekly gave the remix single a D rating and commented negatively that "this chaotic mess isn't likely to find an enthusiastic audience" as the producer "laid a random Nelly verse and some whistle beats on top of Houston's vocals. It's as if someone opened the door between two rooms and cranked warring stereos". Following Houston's death in 2012, Entertainment Weekly published a list of Houston's 25 best songs and ranked "One of Those Days" at number 19; they noted that it was "an underrated single off an underrated album". They further commented that "Whitney gave women of the world an instruction manual for pampering themselves in the Sex and the City era".

== Chart performance ==
In the United States, "One of Those Days" debuted at number 96 on the Billboard Hot 100, the issue dated November 16, 2002. In its twelfth week on the chart, it peaked at number 72. The song stayed on the charts for a total of 19 weeks. On the Hot R&B/Hip-Hop Songs chart, the song debuted at number 74, the issue dated November 9, 2002 and peaked at number 29. The song finished at number 99 on the Billboard R&B/Hip-Hop Singles year-end chart. However, the song topped the US Adult R&B Airplay chart. In the Netherlands, the song entered the Mega Single Top 100 chart at number 87, the week dated January 4, 2003. Two weeks later, the song reached number 80, its peak position. The song stayed on the charts for a total of five weeks. In Australia, the double A-side single charted and peaked at number 48, and stayed on the chart for eight weeks. Elsewhere, "One of Those Days" peaked at number 94 in Switzerland, number 11 on the Belgian Flanders Ultratip chart, number seven on the Wallonia Tip chart and number six on the Hungarian Single Top 10.

== Music video and live performances ==
The music video for "One of Those Days" was directed by Kevin Bray and was shot on October 18 and 19, 2002. The video was shot in Midtown, Atlanta and the club featured in the video is the Nomenclature Museum in Atlanta. According to Arista, "The music video is about Whitney rescuing her girlfriends who are having a bad day." The video shows Houston enjoying a day out and hanging out with her friends at the club, and having a massage at a sauna. The girls end their day out at the club, where Ronald Isley himself makes a cameo appearance.

Houston performed "One of Those Days" in a mini-concert at Lincoln Center Plaza, along with "Tell Me No" and "Do You Hear What I Hear?" on December 9, 2002. Donning a "jeans, a cream-colored turtleneck, full-length shearling coat and sunglasses", Houston performed the song as the opening number of the concert to a crowd of about 4,000 people. Fox News commented that "Houston still [sings] like an angel", but noted that she was "very loose" on stage. The performance aired on Good Morning America the next day.

== Track listings and formats ==
- Australian CD maxi single
1. "One of Those Days" (Radio edit) – 3:56
2. "Whatchulookinat" (Radio edit) – 3:34
3. "Whatchulookinat" (Thunderpuss club mix) – 7:42
- European enhanced CD single
1. "One of Those Days" (Radio edit) – 3:56
2. "One of Those Days" (Extended mix) – 5:42
3. "Love That Man" (Pound Boys R 'n' B remix) – 3:47
4. "One of Those Days" (music video)
- US CD single
1. "One of Those Days" (Radio edit) – 3:56
2. "One of Those Days" (Instrumental) – 4:19
- US CD single 2
1. "One of Those Days" (Radio edit) – 3:56
2. "One of Those Days" (Extended mix) – 5:42
- US 12" vinyl
1. "One of Those Days" (Radio edit) – 3:56
2. "One of Those Days" (Instrumental) – 4:19
3. "One of Those Days" (Album version) – 4:17
4. "One of Those Days" (a cappella) – 4:03
- US 7" vinyl
1. "One of Those Days" (Radio edit) – 3:56
2. "My Love" (featuring Bobby Brown) – 3:28
- US remix CD single
1. "One of Those Days (Remix)" (featuring Nelly) – 3:47
2. "One of Those Days (Remix)" (Instrumental) – 4:37
- Poland CD single
1. "One of Those Days" (Radio edit) – 3:56

== Credits and personnel ==
Credits for "One of Those Days" are adapted from Just Whitney liner notes.

- Whitney Houston – lead vocals, backing vocals, vocal arrangement
- Sharlotte Gibson – backing vocals
- Kevin "She'kspere" Briggs – songwriter, producer, arrangement, MIDI
- Dwight "Lil' Skapp" Reynolds – songwriter
- Ernest Isley – songwriter
- Marvin Isley – songwriter
- Christopher Jasper – songwriter
- Kelly Isley – songwriter
- Patrice "Buttaphly" Stewart – songwriter, vocal production
- Ronald Isley – songwriter
- Rudolph Isley – songwriter
- Ben Briggs III – audio recording
- Kevin "KD" Davis – audio mixing (at Circle House Recording Studios, Miami, Florida)

== Charts ==
=== Weekly charts ===
Chart (2002–2003)	Peak position
Australia (ARIA)	48
Australian Urban (ARIA) with "Whatchulookinat"	22
Belgium (Ultratip Bubbling Under Flanders)	11
Belgium (Ultratip Bubbling Under Wallonia)	7
Hungary (Single Top 40)	6
Netherlands (Dutch Top 40 Tipparade)	6
Poland (Polish Airplay Charts)	7
Netherlands (Single Top 100)	80
Switzerland (Schweizer Hitparade)	94
US Billboard Hot 100	72
US Adult R&B Songs (Billboard)	1
US Hot R&B/Hip-Hop Songs (Billboard)	29

=== Year-end charts ===
Chart (2003)	Position
US Hot R&B/Hip-Hop Songs (Billboard)	99
