= Eritza Laues =

American singer-songwriter

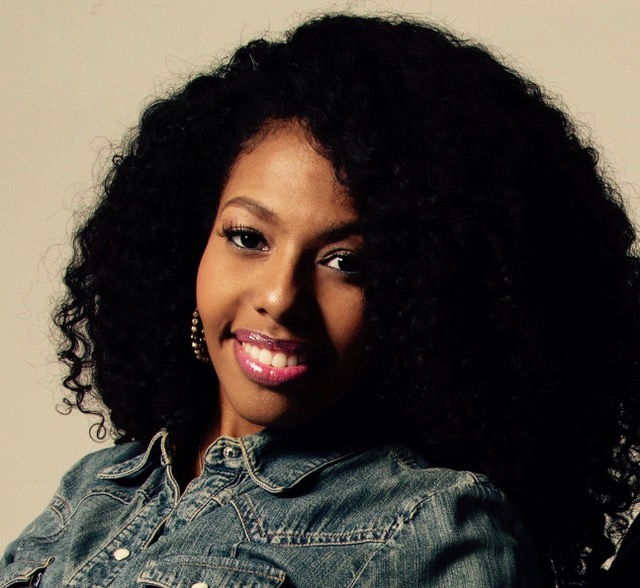
- Eritza Laues, 2017

Background information
- Born: Eritza Laues; 1 May 1983 (age 43)
- Origin: Panama City, Panama
- Genres: R&B; Pop; soul; latin-pop
- Occupations: Singer-songwriter; record producer; Vocal arranger; Television personality; music publisher; A&R executive
- Years active: 1997–present
- Labels: Sony ATV; EMI

Eritza Laues (born 1 May 1983) is a Panamanian-American singer-songwriter, record producer, music publisher, A&R executive, composer and television personality.

== Music career ==
Eritza is an ASCAP Award winner and Grammy nominated writer. Eritza's songs have been featured in major motion pictures, television shows, film soundtracks, and radio spots, as well as national and international commercial campaigns. Eritza has written songs and vocal produced for many artists in the music industry. Some of Eritza's hitmakers include, Whitney Houston's Love That Man which peeked on the Dance Club Songs Billboard Charts at No. 1. Michael Jackson's Heaven Can Wait which certified gold; and both singles were multi-platinum selling albums worldwide. Being Latina Eritza has also worked with Latin Pop and Latin Urban artists such as Nicky Jam, Sofía Reyes, Prince Royce and Juanes.

== Television ==
In 2016 Eritza served as a vocal coach and mentor on the second season of Univision, La Banda, a Latin American teenage singing competition created by Simon Cowell and produced by Ricky Martin.

== Accolades ==
Eritza is an ASCAP Award winner and a 3x Grammy nominated writer. Many of her songs have made top the top 100 and top 10 of the Billboard charts.

== Discography ==
=== 1997 ===
Kenny Lattimore – Weekend

- For You

=== 1999 ===
Case – Open Letter

- Already Have

=== 2001 ===
Kenny Lattimore – Weekend

Michael Jackson – Invincible

- Heaven Can Wait

=== 2002 ===
Gloria Gaynor – I Wish You Love

- I Wish You Love

=== 2003 ===
Blu Cantrell – Bittersweet

- Happily Ever After
- Holding on to Love

Whitney Houston – Just Whitney

- Love That Man

=== 2005 ===
Charlie Wilson – Charlie, Last Name Wilson

- My Guarantee

=== 2006 ===
Jaheim – Ghetto Classics

- Like a DJ

Monrose – Temptation

- Push Up on Me

=== 2007 ===
Thara Prashad – Thara

- Push Up on Me
- Break My Heart

=== 2008 ===
Paula Abdul – Randy Jackson's Music Club, Vol. 1

- Dance Like There's No Tomorrow

Monrose – I Am

- Certified
- Step Aside

=== 2009 ===
Jaheim – Another Round

- Ain't Leavin Without You

=== 2010 ===
Prince Royce – Prince Royce

- Rock The Pants

=== 2011 ===
Naughty by Nature – Anthem Inc.

- God Is Us
- Doozit

=== 2013 ===
Jaheim – Appreciation Day

- Age Ain't a Factor
- He Don't Exist
- What She Really Means
- First Time
- Chase Forever

=== 2016 ===
Jaheim – Struggle Love

- Struggle Love

=== 2017 ===
- Aston Merrygold – One Night in Paris

Nicky Jam – Fénix

- I Can't Forget You
