= One Wish (for Christmas) =

1994 song by Freddie Jackson

Song by Freddie Jackson

from the album At Christmas
- Released: 1994
- Genre: R&B; Christmas
- Length: 4:39
- Label: RCA
- Songwriters: Freddie Jackson; Gordon Chambers; Barry Eastmond
- Producers: Barry Eastmond; Gordon Chambers

"One Wish" is a 1994 Christmas song by American R&B singer Freddie Jackson, from his album At Christmas.

== Whitney Houston version ==
"One Wish (for Christmas)"

Promotional single by Whitney Houston

from the album One Wish: The Holiday Album
- Released: 2003
- Studio: East Bay Music (Westchester, New York); Avatar Studios (New York, New York)
- Genre: Christmas; R&B; soul; pop
- Length: 4:12
- Label: Arista
- Songwriters: Freddie Jackson; Gordon Chambers; Barry Eastmond
- Producers: Gordon Chambers; Barry Eastmond

Whitney Houston singles chronology
"Love That Man" (2003)	"One Wish (for Christmas)" (2003)	"I Look to You" (2009)

American R&B singer Whitney Houston covered the song for her 2003 Christmas album, One Wish: The Holiday Album. Her cover, titled "One Wish (for Christmas)", was the only single released from the album and reached number 20 on the US Billboard Adult Contemporary chart.

=== Promotion ===
A lyric video for "One Wish (for Christmas)" was released on December 11, 2020.

=== Polls and rankings ===
About.com ranked the Houston version the 5th great R&B Christmas song ever in 2019.

=== Personnel ===
Credits adapted from Spotify metadata.

Performers and musicians

- Julien Barber – viola
- Sandra Billingslea – violin
- Joseph Bongiorno – double bass
- Alfred Brown – viola
- Bernard Davis – drums
- John Dexter – viola
- Max Ellen – violin
- Sharlotte Gibson – backing vocalist
- Phil Hamilton – guitar
- Ashley Horne – violin
- Regis Iandiorio – violin
- Bashiri Johnson – percussion
- Olivia Koppell – viola
- Gail Kruvand – double bass
- Leonid Levin – violin
- Jesse Levy – cello
- Margaret Magill – violin
- Kermit Moore – cello
- Eugene Moye – cello
- Belinda Carol Pool – violin
- Maxine Roach – viola
- Andy Stein – violin
- Marti Sweet – violin
- Shelene Thomas – backing vocalist
- Harry Zaratzian – viola

Technical

- Ray Bardani – mixing engineer
- Gordon Chambers – arranger, producer, writer
- Barry J. Eastmond – arranger, conductor, producer, writer
- Phil Magnotti – recording engineer
- Anthony Ruotolo – recording assistance
- Matt Snedecor – mixing assistance
- Freddie Jackson – writer

=== Charts ===
Chart performance for "One Wish (for Christmas)"
Chart (2003)	Peak position
US Adult Contemporary (Billboard)	20
