= Just Whitney =

Studio album by Whitney Houston
- Released: November 27, 2002
- Recorded: 2001–2002
- Studios: Daddy's House Recording Studios (New York, NY); Brandon's Way Recording Studios (Los Angeles, CA); Atlanta Premier Recordings (Atlanta, GA); Westlake Recording Studios (Hollywood, CA); Groove Factor Studios (Atlanta, GA); Crossway Studios (Mendham, NJ); Silent Sound Studios (Atlanta, GA); The Hit Factory Criteria (Miami, FL); Capitol Studios (Los Angeles, CA)
- Genres: Hip-hop soul; dance; R&B
- Length: 39:08
- Labels: Arista; BMG
- Producers: Whitney Houston; Babyface; Bobby Brown; Charlie "CSUN" Bereal; Gordon Chambers; Kenyn Bereal; Kevin Briggs; Missy Elliott; Muhammad2G; Ricky Minor; Rob Fusari; Ted Bishop; Troy Taylor

Whitney Houston chronology
Love, Whitney (2001)	Just Whitney (2002)	One Wish: The Holiday Album (2003)

Singles from Just Whitney
- 1. "Whatchulookinat" Released: September 17, 2002; 2. "One of Those Days" Released: October 29, 2002; 3. "Try It on My Own" Released: February 11, 2003; 4. "Love That Man" Released: May 20, 2003

Just Whitney is the fifth studio album by American singer and actress Whitney Houston, released on November 27, 2002, by Arista Records. It followed My Love is Your Love (1998) and her 2000 compilation, Whitney: The Greatest Hits (2000), and was her first studio album under a new $100 million Arista contract. Her first project without the involvement of her longtime mentor Clive Davis, Houston adopted a looser recording process and a more R&B-oriented sound, working with a broader range of collaborators while exploring themes of resilience, independence, relationships, and media scrutiny.

Upon its release, Just Whitney received mixed reviews, with critics generally praising Houston's powerful and expressive vocals while offering more divided assessments of the album's material, production, and focus on her personal life. Commercially, it debuted at number nine on the Billboard 200, selling 205,000 copies in its first week, a record for Houston during the Nielsen SoundScan era at the time. Internationally, it achieved moderate success, reaching the top 40 in several European markets and earning certifications in Switzerland, France, Brazil, and Japan, while selling approximately 2.5 million copies worldwide.

The album spawned four singles, none of which matched the commercial success of Houston's earlier hits. Lead single "Whatchulookinat" received limited US promotion after a lukewarm radio response, while "One of Those Days" was promoted to urban, rhythmic, and pop radio; "Whatchulookinat", "Try It on My Own", and "Love That Man" each peaked at number one on Billboard's Dance Club Songs chart, while "One of Those Days" topped the Adult R&B Songs chart. In 2003, the album was nominated at the Soul Train Lady of Soul Awards in the category for Best R&B/Soul Album of the Year.

== Background ==
Following the release of her fourth studio album My Love Is Your Love (1998), Houston entered a period in which her activities increasingly extended beyond music. She continued to work in film and television production through her company, BrownHouse Productions, including as an executive producer of The Princess Diaries (2001), and released her first compilation album Whitney: The Greatest Hits, which featured four previously unreleased recordings, including the Deborah Cox-duet "Same Script, Different Cast," "Could I Have This Kiss Forever" with Enrique Iglesias and "If I Told You That," a duet with George Michael, all of which were released as singles to varying levels of success. During this period, Houston's professional activities were accompanied by increasing media attention surrounding her personal life, particularly her marriage to Bobby Brown and reports concerning her health and substance use.

The development of Just Whitney, her next studio album, began following her new recording agreement with Arista Records. In August 2001, she signed a new exclusive multi-album contract with the label reportedly valued at more than $100 million, described by Arista as the largest deal in its history at the time. Houston, who had been signed to Arista since 1983, expressed enthusiasm about continuing her relationship with the label and working with its newly appointed president and CEO Antonio "L.A." Reid. However, the agreement followed the departure of Arista founder and Houston's longtime mentor Clive Davis, who had left the company in 2000 to establish his own label, J Records. Davis's departure marked a significant change for Houston, who had worked closely with him throughout her career and had relied on his guidance in selecting material and shaping her recordings. By then, Houston had sold more than 140 million records worldwide and remained Arista's best-selling artist.

== Recording ==
Under Reid's direction, the album represented a change in Houston's recording process and musical priorities. Rather than following the comparatively structured approach she had used under Davis, Reid encouraged her to work with a wider range of producers and songwriters and to select material more spontaneously. She described the sessions as a "very loose process," in which she would enter the studio, listen to tracks, and determine which songs suited her. Houston sought to make a "positive, feel-good, very soul-oriented album" featuring strong melodies and material that listeners could sing along to. Houston further explained that she was seeking a more "soul oriented" sound, which she felt was lacking from contemporary radio at the time. She also expressed a desire to emphasize R&B, which she felt was increasingly absent from contemporary radio.

The resulting material adopted a more consistently R&B-oriented approach than My Love Is Your Love (1998), which incorporated prominent hip-hop and reggae influences. Reid described the direction as an attempt to re-establish Houston's connection with her core urban audience, while avoiding a deliberate attempt to recreate the crossover pop success of her earlier career. Houston worked with a broader group of collaborators than on her previous albums, including Missy Elliott, Kevin "She'kspere" Briggs, Teddy Bishop, Gordon Chambers, Rob Fusari, Troy Taylor, and longtime collaborator Babyface. Houston also reunited with her husband Bobby Brown on "My Love," their first recorded duet since "Something in Common" (1992), while Tweet contributed background vocals to "Things You Say." Reid and his team also reportedly approached IMx, Rodney Jerkins, Dallas Austin, and duo Jimmy Jam & Terry Lewis to contribute to the album. However, several planned collaborations either failed to materialize, remained unfinished, or were ultimately omitted from the final track listing. These included a proposed duet with Mary J. Blige on a cover of Rufus's "Please Pardon Me (You Remind Me of a Friend)", which Reid suggested but ultimately did not materialize because of scheduling conflicts.

Although Houston described the album as personal, its subject matter was influenced in part by the intense media scrutiny surrounding her private life at the time, particularly coverage of her marriage to Brown and speculation surrounding several of her public appearances. This was most evident on "Whatchulookinat," which Houston co-wrote with Brown and which criticized the press for its coverage of her personal struggles. Other songs, including "Unashamed", "Tell Me No", "Try It on My Own", and "My Love", addressed themes of resilience, independence, relationships, and defiance. Houston described the album as reflecting her experiences with "surviving, raising a family, being a wife or girlfriend and all the challenges that go along with those things," while emphasizing that the songs were intended primarily to create a mood rather than provide a literal account of her life. As the album was recorded amid continued public scrutiny of Houston’s personal life, some industry observers regarded a successful release as important to restoring the commercial momentum of her earlier career. Houston, however, told Launch.com that she did not feel pressured to surpass her previous work, stating that she focused on producing quality work rather than attempting to "outdo" each preceding project.

== Promotion ==
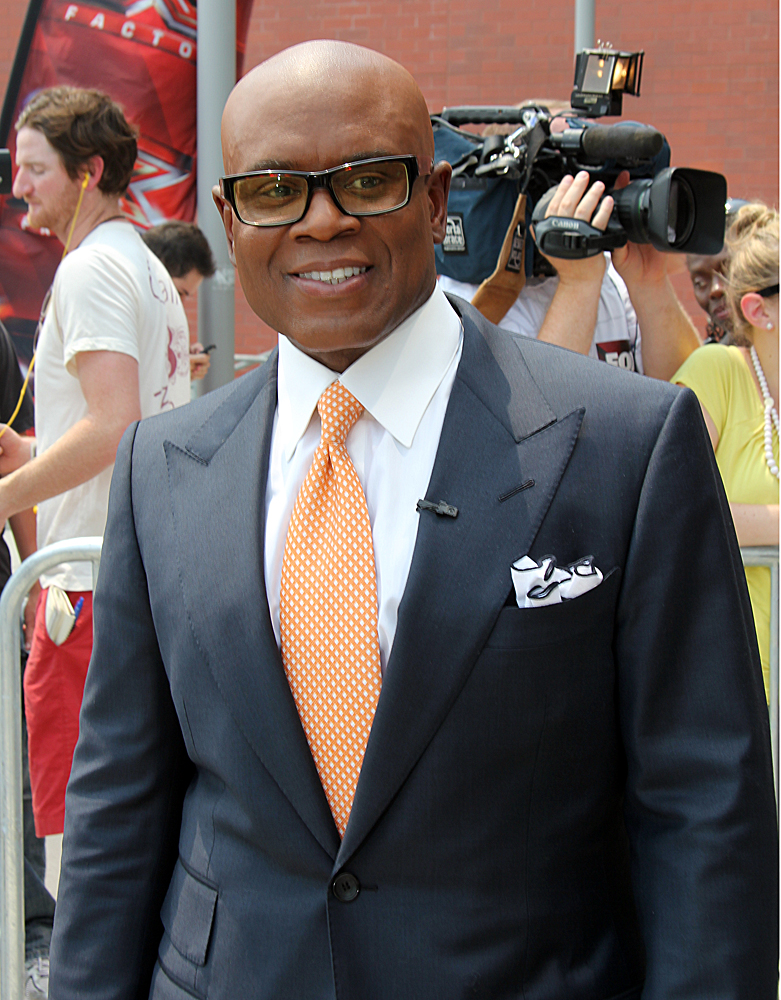
Arista head L.A. Reid sought to re-establish Houston's core R&B audience with Just Whitney.

Arista Records mounted an extensive promotional campaign for Just Whitney, seeking both to re-establish Houston's presence among R&B audiences and to manage the public image surrounding her return after several years of intense media scrutiny. Under Reid, the label sought to "re-establish a core urban base" for Houston, positioning the album as a long-term project rather than an attempt to immediately reproduce the crossover success of her earlier releases. The campaign also emphasized Houston's personal and professional rehabilitation, using television appearances and other media exposure to present a more controlled and candid image of the singer while redirecting attention toward her music. The album's musical direction, however, reportedly caused disagreement within Houston's camp, with some viewing Reid's approach as a departure from the ballad-driven style associated with Davis; one source claimed he was "trying to ghettoize her."

On December 4, 2002, Houston appeared on ABC's Primetime in an interview with Diane Sawyer, during which she addressed the intense media attention surrounding her personal life. Arista executives viewed the appearance as an important opportunity to reconnect Houston with her audience and generate interest in the album. On December 8, Houston performed a free outdoor concert at Lincoln Center in New York, with the performance subsequently broadcast on Good Morning America. The label also arranged appearances on MTV's Total Request Live and BET's 106 & Park, along with online chats and other promotional appearances extending into 2003, and organized listening and viewing parties across the United States in conjunction with the Primetime broadcast, with events held at locations including salons and restaurants. The label also partnered with trade organizations to distribute album samplers and arranged charity auctions featuring clothing from Houston's My Love Is Your Love World Tour.

International promotion began with Houston's performance of "Whatchulookinat" at the MTV Europe Music Awards, held at Palau Sant Jordi, Barcelona on November 14, 2002. The campaign took place amid several obstacles, including repeated delays to the album's release and an internet leak before its official release. Reid nevertheless chose to proceed with the planned campaign, arguing that the leak would not significantly affect sales. In May 2003, Houston appeared at VH1 Divas Duets: An Honors Concert for the VH1 Save the Music Foundation, performing several of her signature hits as well as two songs from the album, "My Love" and "Try It on My Own." The same month, she made a guest appearance in the season finale of the Fox television series Boston Public, portraying herself attending prom with a student and performing "Try It on My Own." Despite these promotional appearances, Houston did not embark on a concert tour in support of the album, making Just Whitney the only non-Christmas studio album of her career without a dedicated tour, although she later performed songs from the album during the Soul Divas Tour, a co-headlining tour with Dionne Warwick and Natalie Cole, which began in July 2004.

=== Singles ===
The album was supported by five singles, comprising four official singles and one promotional release. "Whatchulookinat," co-written by Houston and Bobby Brown and produced by Brown and Muhammad 2G, was released on September 17, 2002, as the album's lead single. Addressing the media's scrutiny of Houston's private life, the song received largely negative reviews and a lukewarm radio response, losing momentum after its initial airplay. The track had also leaked to radio while the album was still being recorded, which contributed to Arista's decision to scale back its promotional campaign and abandon plans for a full US radio push and domestic music video release. It subsequently peaked at number 96 on the US Billboard Hot 100 and number 75 on the Hot R&B/Hip-Hop Songs chart, although it performed more strongly internationally, reaching the top 20 in the United Kingdom, Italy, Greece, Portugal, and Spain. "Whatchulookinat" also reached number one on the US Dance Club Songs chart, becoming Houston's tenth chart-topper on the listing. Houston defended the track as a "sassy and elegant" expression of her frustration with the press.

"One of Those Days", released on October 29, 2002 to urban, rhythmic, and pop radio, subsequently served as the album's lead commercial single in the United States. Produced by Kevin "She'kspere" Briggs, co-written by Houston and built around the melody from the Isley Brothers's 1983 R&B hit "Between the Sheets," the song was accompanied by a music video directed by Kevin Bray, which received significant exposure on BET. The single received a more favorable critical response than its predecessor, with critics generally viewing it as smoother, more accessible, and vocally stronger than "Whatchulookinat." Despite a strong start on radio however, "One of Those Days" achieved only modest chart success in the United States and performed less strongly than "Whatchulookinat" in other markets, peaking at number 29 on the US Hot R&B/Hip-Hop Songs chart, number 72 on the Billboard Hot 100, and number six on the Hungarian Singles Chart.

Third single "Try It on My Own," written and produced by Babyface, was released on February 11, 2003. The ballad received a positive response from fans and critics, many of whom viewed it as a return to the R&B-oriented sound associated with Houston's earlier work. It reached the top 30 in Canada and became the album's second number-one single on the US Dance Club Songs, while also reaching the top ten on the US Adult Contemporary chart. "My Love," Houston's duet with Brown, was issued to urban adult contemporary radio as the album's sole promotional single on March 10, 2003, reaching number 39 on the Adult R&B Songs chart. The final official single, "Love That Man," another Babyface production, was released on May 20, 2003, and topped the Dance Club Songs chart, but failed to enter the Billboard Hot 100 or chart internationally; it was also the only single from the album to be released without an accompanying music video.

== Critical reception ==
Professional ratings
Aggregate scores
Source	Rating
Metacritic	53/100
Review scores
Source	Rating
AllMusic	3/5 stars
Entertainment Weekly	B−
Dotmusic	7/10
The Guardian	2/5 stars
Los Angeles Times	1.5/4 stars
Q	2/5 stars
Rolling Stone	2/5 stars
Slant Magazine	2.5/5 stars
The Times	3/5 stars
USA Today	2.5/4 stars

Upon its release, Just Whitney received mixed reviews from music critics, with an aggregated score of 53 out of 100 on Metacritic, indicating "mixed or average reviews". Critics generally praised Houston's powerful and expressive vocals, while opinions were more divided over the album's material, production, and lyrical focus on her personal controversies. Craig Seymour of the Atlanta Journal-Constitution gave the album a favorable review, describing Houston as "warm, lucid, open, and sharp". BBC critic Keysha Davis praised Houston's return to balladry and R&B, writing that the album marked a return to her "former glory" and highlighted her "exceptional" voice. Mike Bell of Jam! Showbiz similarly praised Houston's ability to bring "real feeling, real life" to the songs, concluding that her vocal power and soul distinguished her from contemporary singers such as Mariah Carey and Celine Dion. Kitty Empire of The Observer favored Just Whitney's candid response to Houston's public struggles, stylish production, and tougher R&B material, particularly "Whatchulookinat" and "Unashamed."

Angus Batey of Dotmusic described Just Whitney as a "cogent, compact and really quite good record", praising its mixture of upbeat R&B and ballads, although he felt it did not equal My Love Is Your Love. Tom Sinclair of Entertainment Weekly gave the album a B− and praised its "old-school vibe", writing that Houston sounded "plucky and on top of her game" despite her personal problems. Sean Daly of The Washington Post likewise viewed the album as a convincing comeback, praising its return to Houston's R&B roots and her vocal performances. Jon Pareles of The New York Times praised Houston's vocal versatility, writing that her voice "sails and spirals" through the album's ballads and anthems and describing her performances as both strategic and improvisatory. Martin Johnson of The Wall Street Journal also praised Houston's powerful vocals and traditional R&B artistry, although he found the album's material and production less compelling. Stephen Thomas Erlewine of AllMusic viewed the album as "an assertion that she's returning to her basics", but criticized Houston's defensive responses to rumors surrounding her personal life.

Dan Aquilante of The New York Post gave the album a mixed review, praising Houston's vocal control and tracks such as "My Love", while criticizing the reliance on outside songwriters and the inclusion of "You Light Up My Life". Billboard similarly found that Just Whitney "appears and sounds more like a work-in-progress than a finished disk". Steve Jones of USA Today praised Houston's sass, attitude, and vocal ability but questioned whether the "thrill" had disappeared amid the album's focus on her personal problems. Jon Caramanica of Rolling Stone was more critical, arguing that the album "lacks any fire whatsoever" and describing its dance tracks as "creaky and unconvincing". Alexis Petridis of The Guardian similarly characterized the album as "a musical step backwards". The most negative assessments focused on the album's lack of emotional conviction and uninspired material. Dan Cairns of The Sunday Times was highly critical, describing Just Whitney as largely unsuccessful, with "Tell Me No" as the lone standout among otherwise weak material and criticizing Houston's strained vocals on several tracks. The Chicago Tribune characterized Just Whitney as a major disappointment, arguing that Houston's exceptional voice was undermined by weak material and production. Robert Hilburn of Los Angeles Times called the album a "timid outing" that failed to match the impact of Houston's earlier work, attributing its shortcomings to a sense of "career desperation" and a loss of the human qualities that had previously defined her music.

== Commercial performance ==
In the United States, Just Whitney debuted and peaked at number nine on the Billboard 200 and number three on the Top R&B/Hip-Hop Albums chart for the week ending December 28, 2002, selling 205,147 copies in its first week. This surpassed the previous first-week sales record of 177,284 copies set by the Waiting to Exhale soundtrack and marked Houston's highest first-week sales for an album during the Nielsen SoundScan era at the time. The album spent 26 weeks on the Billboard 200 and was certified platinum by the Recording Industry Association of America (RIAA) on January 10, 2003, for shipments exceeding one million copies. On the 2003 year-end charts, Just Whitney ranked at number 101 on the Billboard 200 chart and number 30 on the Top R&B/Hip-Hop Albums chart. By 2009, it had sold 737,000 copies in the United States according to Nielsen SoundScan. Following Houston's sudden passing in 2012, Just Whitney re-entered the Billboard 200.

Internationally, Just Whitney achieved moderate commercial success, although its performance varied across markets and generally fell short of the levels reached by Houston's previous albums, making it by far her lowest-charting album in most markets at the time. Its strongest showing came in Switzerland, where it peaked at number 10, followed by Germany at number 16, Italy at number 20, France at number 25, number 32 in Poland, and Austria at number 33. It also reached number 41 in Japan, number 70 in the Netherlands, number 76 in the United Kingdom, and number 85 in Canada. In Australia, Just Whitney failed to enter the main chart, but reached number 22 on the ARIA Urban Albums Chart, The album was certified platinum in Switzerland for shipments of 40,000 copies and gold in France for shipments of 100,000 copies, Brazil for 50,000 copies, and Japan for 100,000 copies. It also sold 42,114 copies in the United Kingdom and 30,973 in South Korea. Despite its comparatively modest performance in several major markets, Just Whitney has sold approximately 2.5 million copies worldwide.

== Track listing ==
Credits taken from liner notes.

North American edition
No.	Title	Writer(s)	Producer(s)	Length
1.	"One of Those Days"	Kevin Briggs; O'Kelly Isley, Jr.; Rudolph Isley; Ronald Isley; Ernie Isley; Marvin Isley; Chris Jasper; Dwight Reynolds; Patrice Stewart	She'kspere	4:15
2.	"Tell Me No"	Kenneth Edmonds; Kandi Burruss; Holly Lamar; Annie Roboff	Babyface	3:44
3.	"Things You Say"	Charlie Bereal; Kenny Bereal; Melissa Elliott; Charlene Keys	CKB; Missy Elliott	4:13
4.	"My Love" (featuring Bobby Brown)	Ted Bishop; Gordon Chambers; Greg Charley	Chambers; Bishop	3:28
5.	"Love That Man"	Edmonds; Rob Fusari; Calvin Gaines; Eritza Laues; Bill Lee; Balewa Muhammad	Babyface; Fusari	3:27
6.	"Try It on My Own"	Edmonds; Jason Edmonds; Carole Bayer Sager; Aleese Simmons; Nathan Walton	Babyface	4:40
7.	"Dear John Letter"	Briggs; Reynolds; Stewart	She'kspere	4:34
8.	"Unashamed"	Darius Good; Luke Paterna; Stephanie Salzman; Troy Taylor	Taylor; The Formula^{[b]}	3:38
9.	"You Light Up My Life"	Joe Brooks	Babyface; Rickey Minor	3:42
10.	"Whatchulookinat"	Whitney Houston; Tammie Harris; Andre Lewis; Jerry Muhammad	Bobby Brown; Muhammad	3:33
Total length:				39:08

International edition
No.	Title	Writer(s)	Producer(s)	Length
1.	"Whatchulookinat"			3:33
2.	"Tell Me No"			3:44
3.	"One of Those Days"			4:10
4.	"Things You Say"			4:13
5.	"My Love" (featuring Bobby Brown)			3:28
6.	"Love That Man"			3:28
7.	"On My Own^{[a]}"			4:39
8.	"Dear John Letter"			4:34
9.	"Unashamed"			3:38
10.	"You Light Up My Life"			3:42
11.	"Whatchulookinat" (P. Diddy Remix)	Houston; Lewis; Muhammad; Harris; Harry Palmer; Christopher Stein; Deborah Harry; Jesse West; Lawrence Parker	Brown; Muhammad; Mario Winans^{[b]}; P. Diddy^{[b]}; Yogi^{[b]}	4:08
Total length:				43:17

Limited edition bonus DVD
No.	Title	Length
1.	"Whatchulookinat" (music video)	4:11
2.	"Love to Infinity Megamix" (Video)	5:15
3.	"Whatchulookinat" (Behind the Scenes)	4:52
Total length:		14:18

Notes

- ^{^[a]} on international editions, "Try It on My Own" is labeled as "On My Own".
- ^{^[b]} denotes co-producer
- ^{^[c]} denotes additional producer

Sample credits

- "Whatchulookinat (P. Diddy Remix)" contains excerpts from "The Champ," as written by Harry Palmer and performed by The Mohawks.

== Personnel ==
Adapted from AllMusic.

- Joey Arbagey – A&R
- Babyface – drum programming, guest artist, acoustic guitar, keyboards, producer, background vocals
- Tom Bender – assistant
- Charile "CSUN" Bereal – producer
- Kenny Bereal – producer
- Ted Bishop – arranger, drum programming, engineer, keyboards, producer, vocal arrangement
- Paul Boutin – engineer
- Kevin "She'kspere" Briggs – arranger, engineer, midi, producer
- Bobby Brown – featured artist, guest artist, primary artist, producer
- Matt Brown – assistant
- Melanie Byrd – production coordination
- Terrence Cash – engineer
- Gordon Chambers – producer, vocal arrangement, vocal producer, background vocals
- Greg Charley – guitar
- Corrado Sgandurra – guitar
- Nathan East – bass
- Kevin KD Davis – mixing
- Missy Elliott – producer
- Cortez Farris – engineer
- Steve Fisher – assistant
- Roxanna Floy – make-up
- Sherree Ford-payne – background vocals
- Rob Fusari – producer
- Jon Gass – mixing
- Steve Genewick – assistant
- Sharlotte Gibson – background vocals
- Kevin Guarnieri – engineer
- Mick Guzauski – mixing
- Gary Houston – background vocals
- Whitney Houston – primary artist, producer, vocal arrangement, vocals, background vocals, songwriter
- Jimmy Hoyson – assistant
- Kenya Ivey – background vocals
- Scott Kieklak – engineer
- Latrelle – background vocals
- Ellin La Var – hair stylist
- Ricky Lawson – drums
- Marc Stephen Lee – assistant
- Wayne Linsey – fender rhodes
- Manny Marroquin – mixing
- Bill Meyers – string arrangements, string conductor
- Ricky Minor – producer
- Muhammad2G – producer
- Sheryl Nields – photography
- Joe Mama-Nitzberg – creative director
- Greg Phillinganes – piano
- Josean Posey – assistant
- Herb Powers – mastering
- L.A. Reid – executive producer
- Dennis Rivadeneira – assistant
- Jeffrey Schulz – art direction, design
- Ivy Skoff – production coordination
- Antonique Smith – background vocals
- Patrice "ButtaPhly" Stewart – vocal producer
- Craig "Niteman" Taylor – assistant
- Shawndella Taylor – A&R
- Troy Taylor – producer, programming, rhythm arrangements, vocal producer
- Michael Hart Thompson – guitar
- Tweet – vocal producer, background vocals
- Tommy Vicari – string engineer
- Randy Waldman – string arrangements, string conductor
- Mike White – engineer
- Patti Wilson – stylist
- Theresa Wilson – A&R
- Jeffrey "Woody" Woodruff – string engineer

== Charts ==
=== Weekly charts ===
2002–2003 weekly chart performance for Just Whitney
Chart (2002–2003)	Peak position
Austrian Albums (Ö3 Austria)	33
Canadian Albums (Nielsen SoundScan)	85
Canadian R&B Albums (Nielsen SoundScan)	34
Dutch Albums (Album Top 100)	70
European Top 100 Albums (Music & Media)	34
French Albums (SNEP)	25
German Albums (Offizielle Top 100)	16
Italian Albums (FIMI)	20
Japanese Albums (Oricon)	41
Polish Albums (ZPAV)	32
Swiss Albums (Schweizer Hitparade)	10
UK Albums (Official Charts)	76
UK R&B Albums (Official Charts)	21
US Billboard 200	9
US Top R&B/Hip-Hop Albums (Billboard)	2

2012 weekly chart performance for Just Whitney
Chart (2012)	Peak position
Croatian Albums (HDU)	26
US Billboard 200	50

=== Monthly charts ===
2002 monthly chart performance for Just Whitney
Chart (2002)	Peak position
South Korean International Albums (RIAK)	3

=== Year-end charts ===
2002 year-end chart performance for Just Whitney
Chart (2002)	Peak position
Canadian R&B Albums (Nielsen SoundScan)	141
South Korean International Albums (RIAK)	42

2003 year-end chart performance for Just Whitney
Chart (2003)	Peak position
US (Billboard 200)	101
US Top R&B/Hip-Hop Albums (Billboard)	30

== Certifications and sales ==
Certifications for Just Whitney
Region	Certification	Certified units/sales
Brazil (Pro-Música Brasil)	Gold	50,000^{*}
France (SNEP)	Gold	100,000^{*}
Japan (RIAJ)	Gold	100,000^{^}
South Korea	—	30,973
Switzerland (IFPI Switzerland)	Platinum	40,000^{^}
United Kingdom	—	42,114
United States (RIAA)	Platinum	1,000,000^{^}
Summaries
Worldwide	—	2,500,000
^{*} Sales figures based on certification alone.^{^} Shipments figures based on certification alone.
