= Transitions (Freddie Jackson album) =

Studio album by Freddie Jackson
- Released: September 26, 2006
- Length: 50:51
- Label: Orpheus
- Producer: Sean Bryant; Jason Farmer; LaDette; Paul Laurence; Marc Nelson; Yasha

Freddie Jackson chronology
Personal Reflections (2005)	Transitions (2006)	For You (2010)

Singles from Transitions
- 1. "Until the End of Time" Released: 2006; 2. "More Than Friends" Released: 2007

Transitions is the twelfth studio album by American singer Freddie Jackson. It was released by Orpheus Music on September 26, 2006.

== Critical reception ==
Professional ratings
Review scores
Source	Rating
Allmusic	3.5/5 stars

Allmusic editor Thom Jurek found that on Transitions "Jackson's sound is not significantly different, but then, when you have a voice like his, it doesn't have to be [...] Jackson reveals on this album the depth of yearning in the grain of his voice. It's full of dreams and possibilities, heartbreak and desire [...] This is a nice touch for an indie, and gives Jackson fans and newcomers plenty to sink their teeth into."

== Track listing ==
No.	Title	Writer(s)	Producer(s)	Length
1.	"Until the End of Time"	Marc Nelson; Wirlie Morris	Nelson; Yasha	4:21
2.	"Transitions"	Anthony Davis	Jason Farmer	4:06
3.	"Hold On Me"	Brandon Nuby; Catherine Powlett; Farmer; Maureen Singleton; Roderick Chambers	Farmer	4:13
4.	"How Can I"	Davis	Farmer	5:33
5.	"Can't Get My Flow"	Paul Laurence; Tyrone Holmes	Laurence	4:40
6.	"Stay and Talk to Me"	Christian Salyer; Nelson	Nelson; Yasha	3:21
7.	"More Than Friends"	Nelson; Morris	Nelson; Yasha	4:29
8.	"Superman"	LaDette	LaDette	4:06
9.	"Tell Me About It"	Davis	Farmer	4:36
10.	"Heaven"	Asaph Womack; Gil Small; Gus Lloyd	Yasha	3:53
11.	"What Cha'll Waiting for"	Eugene Wood; Sean Bryant; Whitney Adams	Bryant	3:23
12.	"Superstar"/"Wind Beneath My Wings"	Bonnie Bramlett; Leon Russell; Jeff Silbar; Larry Henley	Freddie Jackson; Yasha	4:10

== Charts ==
Chart (2006)	Peak position
US Independent Albums (Billboard)	17
US Top R&B/Hip-Hop Albums (Billboard)	26
