= Personal Reflections =

Studio album by Freddie Jackson
- Released: November 1, 2005
- Length: 42:32
- Label: Artemis
- Producer: Kevin Evans

Freddie Jackson chronology
It's Your Move (2004)	Personal Reflections (2005)	Transitions (2006)

Singles from Personal Reflections
- 1. "Back Together Again" Released: 2005

Personal Reflections is the eleventh studio album by Freddie Jackson. It was released by Artemis Records on November 1, 2005 in the United States. A covers project, it comprises renditions of original songs by Paul Davis, Captain & Tennille, and others.

== Critical reception ==
Professional ratings
Review scores
Source	Rating
Allmusic	3.5/5 stars

Allmusic editor Rob Theakston found that with Personal Reflections "Jackson reminds everyone why he was such a potent force in the great quiet storm invasion of the '80s, and why his name belongs up there with some of the style's most well-known artists [...]Jackson never strays too far from the course, thankfully doesn't attempt to demonstrate vocal acrobatics whenever there's a free space of music, and somehow manages to make one of AM pop's most treasured songs sound like it was custom written for him, all within a reasonable and unbloated running time of 40 minutes. It's a solid statement that's filler-free, and one of his best works in over a decade."

== Track listing ==
No.	Title	Writer(s)	Length
1.	"I Go Crazy"	Paul Davis	3:42
2.	"Don't Know Why"	Jesse Harris	4:41
3.	"Love Ballad"	Skip Scarborough	4:32
4.	"Back Together Again" (Duet with Meli'sa Morgan)	Reggie Lucas; James Mtume	5:00
5.	"I Wanna Get Next to You"	Norman Whitfield	4:18
6.	"Save the Best for Last"	Phil Galdston; Wendy Waldman; Jon Lind	3:33
7.	"I'll Be Around"	Phil Hurtt; Thom Bell	3:27
8.	"I Wanna Know Your Name"	Kenneth Gamble; Leon Huff	5:04
9.	"Do That to Me One More Time"	Toni Tennille	4:03
10.	"One in a Million"	Sam Dees	4:13
