= Life After 30 =

Studio album by Freddie Jackson
- Released: September 14, 1999
- Length: 54:29
- Label: Orpheus
- Producer: Royal Bayyan; Tarik Bayyan; Paul Laurence; Mizza; Ramsey "Nate" Shearin; Shawn Waters

Freddie Jackson chronology
Private Party (1995)	Life After 30 (1999)	It's Your Move (2004)

Singles from Lifr After 30
- 1. "Do You Wanna" Released: 1999

Professional ratings
Review scores
Source	Rating
AllMusic	2.5/5 stars

Life After 30 is the ninth studio album by the American singer Freddie Jackson. It was released by Orpheus Music on September 14, 1999. Jackson's only album with the label, it peaked at number 81 on the US Top R&B/Hip-Hop Albums.

== Track listing ==
No.	Title	Writer(s)	Producer(s)	Length
1.	"Do You Wanna"	Shawn Waters; Ramsey "Nate" Shearin	Waters; Shearin	4:45
2.	"All She Really Wanted (One Night Stand)"	Belewa "Bilal" Muhammad; Royal Bayyan	R. Bayyan; Tarik Bayyan	4:37
3.	"Tell Me What You Like"	Waters; Shearin	Waters; Shearin	4:11
4.	"Only Man in Heaven"	Muhammad; R. Bayyan	R. Bayyan; Tarik Bayyan	5:59
5.	"Tiptoe (My Bedroom)"	Muhammad; Bayyan	R. Bayyan; Tarik Bayyan	4:49
6.	"Something You Got (I Always Come Back)"	Muhammad; Bayyan	R. Bayyan; Tarik Bayyan	4:39
7.	"Somebody Said"	Nathaniel "Nate" Clemmons; Freddie Jackson; Janice Dempsey; Paul Laurence	Laurence	4:22
8.	"I Wanna Be Your Man"	Paul Laurence	Laurence	4:47
9.	"So Long Ago"	Clemmons; Jackson; Dempsey; Laurence	Laurence	5:49
10.	"What Is It Good For?"	James McKinney; Dempsey; Laurence	Laurence	6:15
11.	"Do You Wanna" (Remix)	Waters; Quincy "Mizza" Fickling	Waters; Mizza	4:33

== Charts ==
Chart (1999)	Peak position
US Top R&B/Hip-Hop Albums (Billboard)	81
