= Love That Man =

- The Remixes Cover

Single by Whitney Houston

from the album Just Whitney
- Released: May 20, 2003
- Studio: Brandon's Way Recording Studios (Los Angeles, CA); Silent Sound Studios (Atlanta, GA)
- Length: 3:28
- Label: Arista
- Songwriters: Babyface; Rob Fusari; Calvin Gaines; Eritza Laues; Bill Lee; Balewa Muhammad
- Producers: Babyface; Rob Fusari

Whitney Houston singles chronology
"Try It on My Own" (2003)	"Love That Man" (2003)	"One Wish (for Christmas)" (2003)

Audio sample
- "Love That Man": file; help

"Love That Man" is a song by American singer Whitney Houston. It was written by Kenneth "Babyface" Edmonds, Rob Fusari, Calvin Gaines, Eritza Laues, Bill Lee, and Balewa Muhammad for her fifth studio album Just Whitney (2002), with production helmed by Edmonds and Fusari. The song was released as the album's fourth and final single on May 20, 2003 by Arista Records. Commissioned as a remix single in the United States, Peter Rauhofer and The Pound Boys produced remixes of the song. "Love That Man" became Houston's 12th number-one hit on the US Billboard Hot Dance Club Play chart.

== Background ==
"Love That Man" was written by Babyface, Rob Fusari, Calvin Gaines, Eritza Laues, Bill Lee, Balewa Muhammad, while production was helmed by Babyface and Fusari. Having previously worked with Houston, Babyface was approached by L.A. Reid to contribute to the album, while Fusari, who was then primarily known for his contribution on Destiny's Child's Survivor (2001), became involved became involved after a demo of "Love That Man" reached executives at Houston's label, Arista Records. Commenting on his involvement with Just Whitney, Fusari said: "Arista liked my song "Love That Man," and they wanted me to produce it on Whitney's new album [...] They flew me down to Miami to work with Whitney on this song. I ended up co-producing this song with Babyface."

== Critical reception ==
Critics offered mixed assessments of "Love That Man," with several praising its retro-inspired R&B sound and Houston's vocal performance. Dom Phillips of Heat named it the album's best track, describing it as a "bass-snappin' 80s-style groover," while Blues & Soul called it a "sublimely soulful" R&B track and praised Houston's vocals and the song's production. Ernest Hardy of LA Weekly described the song as a "giddily disposable" track that recalled Houston's earlier pop hits "How Will I Know" and "So Emotional," while Dan Aquilante of the New York Post characterized it as an "up-tempo devotional."

Keysha Davids of BBC Music viewed the song as an apparent ode to Bobby Brown, praising Houston as "soulful and sincere" and noting its mid-tempo arrangement, simple bass line and restrained production. Alexis Petridis of The Guardian similarly regarded it as a throwback to the crossover pop-soul of Houston's earlier work, particularly "I Wanna Dance with Somebody." Less favorable, Dallas Morning News likened the song to "second-rate" Michael Jackson and describing its subject as Houston's devotion to her husband. Joan Anderman of The Boston Globe reduced the song to Houston "stand[ing] by her bad boy," while Music Week characterized it as "dull pop-funk."

== Commercial performance ==
Released as a single in North America only, "Love That Man" became Houston's 12th number-one hit on the US Billboard Hot Dance Club Play chart.

== Track listings ==
All tracks written by Kenneth "Babyface" Edmonds, Rob Fusari, Calvin Gaines, Eritza Laues, Bill Lee, and Balewa Muhammad.

Remix single
No.	Title	Producer(s)	Length
1.	"Love That Man" (Peter Rauhofer New NYC Mix)	Babyface; Rob Fusari; Peter Rauhofer^{[a]}	10:11
2.	"Love That Man" (Peter Rauhofer Retro Mix)	Babyface; Fusari; Rauhofer^{[a]}	8:20
3.	"Love That Man" (Pound Boys Love That Mix)	Babyface; Fusari; Pound Boys^{[a]}	7:45
4.	"Love That Man" (Pound Boys Love That Dub)	Babyface; Fusari; Pound Boys^{[a]}	7:16

Notes

- ^{^[a]} denotes additional producer

== Credits and personnel ==
Credits lifted from the liner notes of Just Whitney.

- Babyface – producer, writer
- Rob Fusari – producer, writer
- Calvin Gaines – writer
- Eric Kupper – keyboards
- Eritza Laues – writer
- Bill Lee – writer
- George O. Luksch – keyboards
- Balewa Muhammad – writer

== Charts ==
=== Weekly charts ===
Chart (2003)	Peak position
US Dance Club Songs (Billboard) Dance Mixes	1

=== Year-end charts ===
Chart (2003)	Position
US Dance Club Songs (Billboard)	43

== Release history ==
"Love That Man" release history
Region	Date	Format(s)	Label	Ref.
United States	May 20, 2003	Digital download	Arista	
United States	June 3, 2003	Digital download – Remix single	Arista	

== See also ==
- List of number-one dance singles of 2003 (U.S.)
