= It's Your Move (album) =

Studio album by Freddie Jackson
- Released: February 24, 2004
- Length: 63:54
- Label: Martland
- Producer: Bob Baldwin; G-Luv; Mark Henry; Dennis Johnson; Etienne Lytle; Plat'num House; Taz

Freddie Jackson chronology
Life After 30 (1999)	It's Your Move (2004)	Personal Reflections (2005)

It's Your Move is the tenth studio album by American singer Freddie Jackson. It was released through Martland Entertainment Group on February 24, 2004. His first album in five years, it peaked at number 45 on the US Top R&B/Hip-Hop Albums.

== Critical reception ==
Professional ratings
Review scores
Source	Rating
Allmusic	2.5/5 stars

Allmusic editor Rob Theakston found that with "the landscape and climate of urban radio" having changed and Jackson having "to adapt, [...] It's Your Move [has] a bit of a hurried, uneven production style throughout. Jackson's voice is still the dominant focus, as smooth and assured as ever, even though it feels at odds with the slick and overly polished production sound. Nevertheless, fans pining for new Jackson material will be pleased in what they hear here, even if it isn't exactly his finest offering."

== Track listing ==
No.	Title	Writer(s)	Producer(s)	Length
1.	"Natural Thang"	Bob Baldwin; Dennis Johnson; Zoiea Ohizep	Baldwin; Johnson	4:34
2.	"You Only Get (One Love)"	Lewis Bryant, Jr.; Rodney Young	Plat'num House; Taz	4:11
3.	"How 'bout Us"	Freddie Jackson; Bryant; Young	Plat'num House; Taz	3:42
4.	"It's on Tonight"	Bryant; Young	Plat'num House; Taz	4:33
5.	"Let Me Know"	Jackson; Bryant; Young	Plat'num House; Taz	4:12
6.	"Say Yeah"	Jackson	Plat'num House; Taz	7:23
7.	"Sealed With a Kiss"	Jackson; Bryant; Young	Plat'num House; Taz	4:24
8.	"Over & Over"	Jackson; Bryant; Young	Plat'num House; Taz	4:55
9.	"It's Your Move"	Jackson; Bryant; Young; Barry Dufae; Markus Vance; Robert Stevenson; Roosevelt Butler	Plat'num House; Taz	4:00
10.	"Don't Give Up (On Our Love)"	Bryant; Young	Plat'num House; Taz	3:58
11.	"I Do"	Jackson	Plat'num House; Taz	4:33
12.	"Stay"	Jackson; Bryant; Young; Deniece Williams; Hank Redd; Nathan Watts; Susaye Greene	Etienne Lytle; Mark Henry	4:39
13.	"Natural Thang" (Smooth Jazz Remix)	Baldwin; Johnson; Ohizep	Plat'num House; Taz	4:41
14.	"One Love" (Remix)	Bryant; Young; Jalil Hutchins; L. Michael Smith; Michael Williams	Plat'num House; Taz; G-Luv	4:33

== Charts ==
Chart (2004)	Peak position
US Top R&B/Hip-Hop Albums (Billboard)	45
