= Private Party (album) =

1995 studio album by Freddie Jackson

Studio album by Freddie Jackson
- Released: February 28, 1995
- Studios: East Bay Recording (Tarrytown, New York); Platinum Island Studios, Phat Tracks Recording Studios, Electric Lady Studios, Axis Studios and Quad Sound Studios (New York City, New York); BearTracks Studios (Suffern, New York); On The Way Studios (Cleveland, Ohio); Our Own Studios (Los Angeles, California)
- Length: 46:15
- Label: Scotti Bros.
- Producers: Yasha Barjona; Chanz; Michael Christian; Barry J. Eastmond; Zac Harmon; Gerald Levert; Edwin "Tony" Nicholas; Christopher Troy

Freddie Jackson chronology
At Christmas (1994)	Private Party (1995)	Life After 30 (1999)

Singles from Private Party
- 1. "Rub Up Against You" Released: 1995; 2. "(I Want To) Thank You" Released: 1995

Private Party is the eighth studio album by Freddie Jackson. It was released by Scotti Bros. Records on February 28, 1995. The album produced the top 25 R&B single "Rub Up Against You," produced by Gerald Levert and Edwin Nicholas.

== Critical reception ==
Professional ratings
Review scores
Source	Rating
Allmusic	3/5 stars

AllMusic editor Ed Hogan wrote that most of the material on Private Party falls "in the 'let's shower together' category, though it must be pointed out that the content never goes into the overly graphic area of a lot of modern R&B [...] Freddie Jackson's romantic balladeering is, for the most part, not the kind of material you would find at the top of the charts these days. And that's a shame."

== Track listing ==
No.	Title	Writer(s)	Producer(s)	Length
1.	"Private Party"	Gordon Chambers; Barry J. Eastmond	Eastmond	5:18
2.	"Rub Up Against You"	Edwin "Tony" Nicholas; Gerald Levert	Nicholas; Levert	4:43
3.	"Love You All Over"	Marvin "Chanz" Parkman	Chanz	4:06
4.	"(I Want To) Thank You"	Chambers; Eastmond	Eastmond	4:31
5.	"Your Lovin' (Is a Good Thang)"	William "Zac" Harmon; T. Moses; Christopher Troy	Harmon; Troy	5:39
6.	"I Tried My Best"	Freddie Jackson; Eastmond	Eastmond	4:31
7.	"No One Else"	Chambers; Eastmond	Eastmond	6:27
8.	"Lay Your Love on Me"	Eastmond; Jolyon Skinner	Eastmond	5:27
9.	"Teach Me"	Eastmond; Skinner	Eastmond	6:13
10.	"Once in a While"	Yasha Barjona; Michael Christian	Barjona; Christian	4:23

== Personnel and credits ==
Musicians

- Freddie Jackson – lead vocals, backing vocals
- Barry J. Eastmond – keyboards (1, 4, 6–9), drum programming (1, 4, 6–9), arrangements (1, 4, 6–9), organ (7)
- Edwin "Tony" Nicholas – keyboards (2), keyboard programming (2), drums (2), sequencing (2)
- Marvin "Chanz" Parkman – keyboards (3), drum programming (3), sequencing (3), backing vocals (3)
- Zac Harmon – keyboards (5), bass (5)
- Christopher Troy – keyboards (5), Rhodes electric piano (5), drum programming (5)
- Herb Middleton – keyboards (8), drum programming (8)
- Yasha Barjona – all instruments (10), backing vocals (10)
- DejI Coker – saxophone solo (5)
- Gordon Chambers – backing vocals (1, 4)
- Gerald Levert – backing vocals (2)
- Sue Ann Carwell – backing vocals (5)
- T.C. – backing vocals (5), vocal arrangements (5)
- Curtis King Jr. – backing vocals (6, 8)
- Sharon Bryant – backing vocals (7)
- B.J. Nelson – backing vocals (7)
- Angel Rogers – backing vocals (9)
- Jolyon Skinner – backing vocals (9)
- Michael Christian – backing vocals (10)

Music arrangements

- Barry J. Eastmond – arrangements (1, 4, 6–9)
- Gerald Levert – arrangements (2)
- Edwin "Tony" Nicholas – arrangements (2)
- Marvin "Chanz" Parkman – arrangements (3)
- Zac Harmon – vocal arrangements (5)
- Christopher Troy – vocal arrangements (5)
- Herb Middleton – arrangements (8)
- Yasha Barjona – arrangements (10)

Production

- Kevin L. Evans – executive producer
- Beau Huggins – executive producer, A&R direction
- Freddie Jackson – co-executive producer, A&R direction
- Michelle Meena – production coordinator
- Zack Vaz – production coordinator
- Jimmy "Mac" MacNeal – coordinating assistant
- Missy Sheire – coordinating assistant
- Joel Sylvain – coordinating assistant
- Doug Haverty – art direction, design
- Carl Studna – photography
- Hush Productions, Inc. – management
- Anne Thomas – management administrator

Technical credits

- Tony Dawsey – mastering at Masterdisk (New York, NY)
- Barry J. Eastmond – engineer (1, 4, 6–9)
- Mark Partis – engineer (1, 4, 6–9), mixing (1, 4, 8, 9)
- Stan Wallace – engineer (1, 4, 6–9), mixing (6, 7)
- Axel Niehaus – engineer (2, 3, 5, 10), mixing (3, 10)
- Ron Shaffer – engineer (2), mixing (2)
- Ken "Duro" Ifill – engineer (3, 10)
- Zac Harmon – engineer (5)
- Christopher Troy – engineer (5)
- Jason Vogel – mixing (5)
- Louis Alfred III – engineer (10)
- Greg Gasperino – assistant engineer (2)
- Aman Junaid – assistant engineer (3)
- Ann Mincieli – mix assistant (3)
- Tony Cuestas – mix assistant (5), assistant engineer (10)
- Sean Coffey – assistant engineer (10)
- Steve Souder – mix assistant (10)

== Charts ==
Chart (1995)	Peak position
US Billboard 200	187
US Top R&B/Hip-Hop Albums (Billboard)	28
