= At Christmas (Freddie Jackson album) =

Studio album by Freddie Jackson
- Released: October 25, 1994
- Studios: East Bay Studios (Tarrytown, New York); The Power Station (New York City, New York); BearTracks Studios (Suffern, New York)
- Genres: Funk; soul; Christmas music
- Length: 45:00
- Labels: Orpheus; RCA
- Producer: Barry Eastmond

Freddie Jackson chronology
Here It Is (1994)	At Christmas (1994)	Private Party (1995)

At Christmas is the seventh studio album by American singer Freddie Jackson. It was released by Orpheus Music and RCA Records on October 25, 1994. His first Christmas album, it consists of eleven tracks, featuring four original songs, three of them co-penned with Jackson, and seven cover versions of Christmas standards and carols. The album reached number 65 on the US Top R&B/Hip-Hop Albums.

== Critical reception ==
Professional ratings
Review scores
Source	Rating
Allmusic	2/5 stars

Allmusic editor Roch Parisien wrote that "featuring overstated atmosphere, Jackson makes the effort to co-pen three original songs – "One Wish," "Come On Home for Christmas," and the title track."

== Track listing ==
All tracks produced and arranged by Barry Eastmond.

No.	Title	Writer(s)	Length
1.	"One Wish"	Barry Eastmond; Gordon Chambers; Freddie Jackson	4:39
2.	"At Christmas"	Eastmond; Chambers; McKinney	3:51
3.	"The Christmas Song"	Robert Wells; Mel Tormé	3:56
4.	"Under the Mistletoe"	Eastmond; Jolyon Skinner	4:14
5.	"O Holy Night"	Adolphe Adam; John Sullivan Dwight	5:00
6.	"This Christmas"	Donny Hathaway; Nadine McKinnor	3:59
7.	"Have Yourself a Merry Little Christmas" (Interlude)	Hugh Martin; Ralph Blane	0:44
8.	"Come on Home (For Christmas)"	Eastmond; Jackson; Skinner	4:30
9.	"Have Yourself a Merry Little Christmas"	Martin; Blane	3:13
10.	"White Christmas"	Irving Berlin	5:18
11.	"Silent Night"	Franz Xaver Gruber; Joseph Mohr	4:54

== Personnel ==
Musicians

- Freddie Jackson – lead vocals, backing vocals (1, 2, 4–6, 8, 11)
- Barry J. Eastmond – keyboard programming (1–5, 8, 10, 11), drum programming (1–5, 8, 10, 11), keyboards (6, 7, 9)
- Herb Middleton – keyboards (6)
- James Genus – bass (6)
- Buddy Williams – drums (6)
- Roger Byam – soprano saxophone (3), tenor sax solo (6)
- Charles Dougherty – alto saxophone (6)
- Mac Gollehon – trumpet (6)
- Gordon Chambers – backing vocals (1, 10)
- Cindy Mizelle – backing vocals (1, 5)
- B.J. Nelson – backing vocals (4, 6)
- Paulette McWilliams – backing vocals (5)

Children's choir and playing on "At Christmas"

Children's choir

- Barry J. Eastmond – choir conductor
- Paulette McWilliams – choir contractor
- Akina Adderley, Alana Adderley, Melodie Eastmond, Takiyah Hampden and Avanti C. Taylor – choir singers

Children playing

- Akina Adderley, Alana Adderley, Barry Eastmond Jr,, Melodie Eastmond, Beau Hampden Jr., Janelle Hampden and Enjoli Williams

Music arrangements

- Barry J. Eastmond – all arrangements, horn arrangements (6), BGV arrangements (10)
- Herb Middleton – arrangements (6)
- Gordon Chambers – BGV arrangements (10)

== Production ==
- Alison Ball-Gabriel – executive producer
- Beau Huggins – executive producer
- Zack Vaz – production coordinator
- Anne Thomas – administrator
- Jackie Murphy – art direction
- Amy Wenzler – design
- Joe Grant – photography
- Hush Productions, Inc. – management

Technical credits

- Earl Cohen – engineer
- Mark Partis – engineer, mixing (2, 4, 6, 10, 11)
- Stan Wallace – engineer, mixing (7–9)
- Alec Head – mixing (1, 3, 5)
- Steve Regina – mix assistant

== Charts ==
Chart (1994)	Peak position
US Top R&B/Hip-Hop Albums (Billboard)	65
