= Whatchulookinat =

Single by Whitney Houston

from the album Just Whitney
- B-side: "Love to Infinity Megamix"
- Released: August 5, 2002
- Recorded: 2002
- Studio: Daddy's House Recording Studios (Los Angeles, CA)
- Length: 3:35
- Label: Arista
- Songwriters: Whitney Houston; Michael Andre Lewis; Tammie Harris; Jerry Muhammad
- Producers: Bobby Brown; Muhammad 2G

Whitney Houston singles chronology
"The Star Spangled Banner" (2001)	"Whatchulookinat" (2002)	"One of Those Days" (2002)

Music video
- "Whatchulookinat" on YouTube

"Whatchulookinat" is a song by American singer Whitney Houston. One of the few songs she co-wrote, co-writers include Michael Andre Lewis, Tammie Harris, and Jerry Muhammad. The track was produced by Houston's husband Bobby Brown and Muhammad 2G. Lyrically the song was aimed at critics that were attacking her image at the time. It was serviced to radio on August 5, 2002, via Arista Records, as the lead single to her fifth studio album Just Whitney (2002). Multiple remixes were also made from producers such as Thunderpuss, Full Intention, and Junior Vasquez.

The song received mixed reviews, with critics praising Houston’s assertive vocals and response to media scrutiny while criticizing its defensive lyrics, dated production, and focus on her personal troubles. Commercially, it achieved moderate international success, reaching the top ten in Canada, Greece, Portugal, and Spain, but became Houston’s lowest-charting lead single in the United States at the time, peaking at number 96 on the Billboard Hot 100. Its underperformance eventually contributed to "One of Those Days" being selected as the album's lead single in the United States.

== Composition ==
"Whatchulookinat"
The lead single "Whatchulookinat"'s lyrics were Houston's reply to media for its negative attraction to her personal life.

"Whatchulookinat" was produced by Bobby Brown and Muhammad 2G and written by Whitney Houston, Andre Lewis, Tammie Harris, Jerry Muhammad.

The song was Houston's response to what she felt was intense and sometimes unfair and inaccurate media criticism at the time. "My following is real strong/ Try so hard to show the whole world what I do/ Now I'm turnin' the cameras back on you/ Same spotlights that once gave me fame/ Tryin' to dirty up Whitney's name," Houston sings. She then laments about people who've been "messing with [her] reputation" and "concentration" and don't "even have no education" on the chorus, singing, "I feel your eyes on me/ You been telling lies on me".

== Critical reception ==
Professional ratings
Review scores
Source	Rating
Entertainment Weekly	F

Critical response to "Whatchulookinat" was mixed, with some critics praising Houston's vocal performance and the song's assertive response to media scrutiny, while others criticized its defensive lyrics, dated production, and focus on her personal troubles. BBC Music editor Keysha Davis described the song as an "assertive, defiant statement against her critics," highlighting Houston's authoritative vocal delivery. Kitty Empire of The Observer praised its stylish urban production and its direct response to the media scrutiny surrounding Houston, describing it as looking "straight back at the lenses." Dan Aquilante of the New York Post dcharacterized it as a "peppy yet cranky" song directed at the press, noting its criticism of the media's role in elevating and subsequently scrutinizing Houston.

Alexis Petridis of The Guardian criticized the song's defensive response to the negative publicity surrounding Houston, but praised her "bravura" and "feisty" vocal performance. Stephen Thomas Erlewine of AllMusic criticized its defensive lyrics and portrayal of Houston as a victim of media scrutiny, arguing that this undermined the album's otherwise contemporary soul material. He described the song as "roundly ignored" and viewed its approach as part of a broader attempt to rehabilitate Houston's public image Vladimir Bogdanov, writing in All Music Guide to Soul, similarly criticized Houston for "playing the victim," arguing that the song made her appear as though she "had something to hide."

Sal Cinquemani of Slant Magazine described "Whatchulookinat" as an "icy and lifeless" attack on the media and viewed its treatment of Houston's personal troubles as unsuccessful: Gerrick Kennedy, author of the book Didn't We Almost Have it All: In Defense of Whitney Houston, later characterized the song as a "grossly miscalculated" move that invited further scrutiny of Houston's personal life: Craig Seymour of Entertainment Weekly criticized its dated production and focus on Houston's media scrutiny, calling it a "stumble in the wrong direction" and awarding it an F. In the most negative assessments, Billboard's Chuck Taylor described the song as a "status-quo midtempo jam" in which "generic voices" overshadowed Houston. He criticized its "woe-is-Whitney" theme as "poor little rich girl whining" and concluded that the song was "boring." Rolling Stone critic Jon Caramanica likewise dismissed the track as "creaky and unconvincing."

== Chart performance ==
"Whatchulookinat" achieved moderate commercial success internationally, with its performance varying across regions. In the United States, it achieved greater success on the dance charts than on the mainstream singles charts. The song received a lukewarm response from radio, limiting its momentum following its initial airplay. Its early leak to radio while the album was still in production also contributed to Arista Records scaling back its promotional campaign, including abandoning plans for a full-scale US radio push and a domestic music video release. Despite its limited mainstream exposure, the song became Houston's tenth number-one on the Billboard Dance Club Songs chart. On the Billboard Hot 100, it debuted and peaked at number 96, making it her lowest-debuting single since "Hold Me" and, at the time, her lowest-peaking lead single. It also reached number 75 on the Hot R&B/Hip-Hop Songs chart.

Elsewhere, "Whatchulookinat" performed strongest in Canada, peaking at number three on the Canadian Singles Chart. The single also charted in numerous European markets, where it would remain the album's only single to chart in several markets. It peaked at number six in Spain, number nine in Greece, number 12 in Denmark, number 13 in the United Kingdom, and number 17 in Italy. In the Netherlands, it reached number 29 on the Single Top 100 and number five on the Dutch Top 40. It also peaked at number 22 in Switzerland, number 29 in Sweden, number 47 in Germany, number 53 in Austria, and number 65 in France. On the European Hot 100 Singles chart, the single peaked at number 40. In the United Kingdom, "Whatchulookinat" performed more strongly on the R&B chart, reaching number 8 on the UK Hip Hop and R&B Singles Chart, while in Australia it peaked at number 22 on the ARIA Urban chart, where it was listed in conjunction with "One of Those Days."

== Music video ==
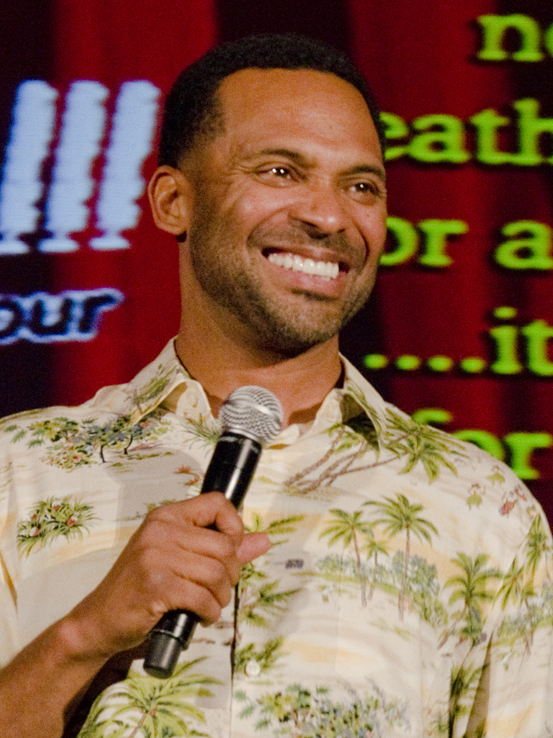
Actor Mike Epps appears in the music video for "Whatchulookinat."

An initial music video for "Whatchulookinat" was planned in August 2002, with Dave Meyers serving as director. Production was scheduled to begin on August 8, but Houston did not appear for the shoot and the production was subsequently cancelled. Contemporary reports attributed the cancellation to disagreements over the video's proposed concept and tone, particularly how to present the song's criticism of the media. New York magazine additionally reported that Arista Records prioritized completing Just Whitney, which was not yet finished.

Houston subsequently reteamed with frequent collaborator Kevin Bray to film a video for the song in Atlanta in the week of September 16, 2002. The video presented the song as Houston's response to media scrutiny of her personal life. Mike Epps portrayed an overzealous paparazzo who confronts Houston as she leaves a studio with Faith Evans. Much of the video takes place within the interior of Epps' camera, depicted as a white set filled with cameras, vintage film equipment, reporters, and photographers who follow Houston's movements as she performs. Future rapper and Migos member Offset appears as a background dancer.

== Retrospectives ==
In February 2017, on the fifth anniversary of her death, Vibe included the song in their list of her "10 Slept-On Songs", writing that despite the initial mixed reviews, the song was "one of the more honest tracks Whitney had put out during her tumultuous years in the spotlight in the early 2000s" and that it served as an "early clapback to the media for what Whitney believed was constant and unfair scrutiny."

== Track listings and formats ==
US promo CD

1. "Whatchulookinat" (album version) – 3:35
2. "Whatchulookinat" (instrumental) – 3:33

US vinyl 12"

- A1 "Whatchulookinat" (album version) – 3:35
- A2 "Whatchulookinat" (instrumental) – 3:33
- B1 "Whatchulookinat" (album version) – 3:35
- B2 "Whatchulookinat" (a cappella) – 3:33

US 2×12" promo (Thunderpuss Remixes)

- A "Whatchulookinat" (Thunderpuss Anthem) – 11:53
- B "Whatchulookinat" (Thunderpuss Club Mix) – 7:42
- C "Whatchulookinat" (Thunderpuss Dub) – 8:43
- D1 "Whatchulookinat" (Thunderpuss Tribe-A-Pella) – 6:36
- D2 "Whatchulookinat" (Thunderpuss Drums) – 5:24

US 2x12"

- A "Whatchulookinat" (Thunderpuss Club Mix) – 7:42
- B "Whatchulookinat" (Full Intention Club Mix) – 7:00
- C "Whatchulookinat" (Thunderpuss Dub) – 8:43
- D1 "Whatchulookinat" (Full Intention Dub) – 6:51
- D2 "Whatchulookinat" (Full Intention Old School R&B) – 3:33

European CD single

1. "Whatchulookinat" (radio mix) – 3:35
2. "Whatchulookinat" (P. Diddy Radio Mix) – 4:08

Europe Maxi-CD

1. "Whatchulookinat" (radio mix) – 3:35
2. "Whatchulookinat" (P. Diddy Radio Mix) – 4:08
3. "Whatchulookinat" (Thunderpuss Club Mix) – 7:42
4. "Whatchulookinat" (Full Intention Club Mix) –7:02

UK CD 1

1. "Whatchulookinat" (radio mix) – 3:35
2. "Whatchulookinat" (P. Diddy Radio Mix) – 4:08
3. "Whatchulookinat" (Full Intention Club Mix) – 7:02

UK CD 2 (special edition)

1. "Whatchulookinat" (radio edit) – 3:35
2. "Love to Infinity Megamix" (Contains "I Wanna Dance with Somebody (Who Loves Me)", "So Emotional", "I'm Your Baby Tonight", "I'm Every Woman" and "It's Not Right But It's Okay") – 9:22

== Personnel ==
- Written by Whitney Houston, Andre Lewis, Tammie Harris and Jerry Muhammad
- Produced by Bobby Brown and Muhammad 2G
- Mixed by Kevin "KD" Davis at Zac Digital, Atlanta, GA
- Lead vocals by Whitney Houston
- Background vocals by Whitney Houston & Gary Houston
- Vocal arrangement by Whitney Houston

== Charts ==
=== Weekly charts ===
Weekly chart performance for "Whatchulookinat"
Chart (2002)	Peak position
Australian Urban (ARIA) with "One of Those Days"	22
Austria (Ö3 Austria Top 40)	53
Belgium (Ultratop 50 Flanders)	48
Belgium (Ultratip Bubbling Under Wallonia)	6
Canada (Nielsen Soundscan)	3
Denmark (Tracklisten)	12
European Hot 100 Singles (Music & Media)	40
France (SNEP)	65
Germany (GfK)	47
Greece (IFPI)	9
Italy (FIMI)	17
Netherlands (Top 40 Tipparade)	5
Netherlands (Single Top 100)	29
Portugal (AFP)	5
Quebec (ADISQ)	25
Romania (Romanian Top 100)	89
Scottish Singles Sales (Official Charts)	22
Spain (Promusicae)	6
Sweden (Sverigetopplistan)	29
Switzerland (Schweizer Hitparade)	22
UK Singles (Official Charts)	13
UK Hip Hop/R&B (Official Charts)	8
US Billboard Hot 100	96
US Hot R&B/Hip-Hop Songs (Billboard)	75
US Dance Club Songs (Billboard)	1
US CHR/Pop Top 50 (Radio & Records)	46
US CHR/Rhythmic Top 50 (Radio & Records)	40

=== Year-end charts ===
Year-end chart performance for "Whatchulookinat"
Chart (2002)	Position
Canada (Nielsen SoundScan)	64
UK Urban (Music Week)	14
US Hot Dance Club-Play Singles (Billboard)	20

== See also ==
- List of number-one dance singles of 2002 (U.S.)
