= Billboard Year-End Hot Black Singles of 1988 =

American music chart

This is a list of Billboard magazine's Top Hot Black Singles of 1988.

No.	Title	Artist(s)
1	"I Want Her"	Keith Sweat
2	"Girlfriend"	Pebbles
3	"Just Got Paid"	Johnny Kemp
4	"I Want to Be Your Man"	Roger
5	"Two Occasions"	The Deele
6	"Love Changes"	Kashif and Meli'sa Morgan
7	"Nite and Day"	Al B. Sure!
8	"My Forever Love"	LeVert
9	"Joy"	Teddy Pendergrass
10	"Love Overboard"	Gladys Knight & the Pips
11	"If You Can Do It: I Can Too"	Meli'sa Morgan
12	"Nice 'n' Slow"	Freddie Jackson
13	"Wishing Well"	Terence Trent D'Arby
14	"Make It Last Forever"	Keith Sweat
15	"Da Butt"	E.U.
16	"Off on Your Own (Girl)"	Al B. Sure!
17	"The Way You Make Me Feel"	Michael Jackson
18	"To Prove My Love"	Michael Cooper
19	"Mamacita"	Troop
20	"Mercedes Boy"	Pebbles
21	"Skeletons"	Stevie Wonder
22	"Baby, Be Mine"	Miki Howard
23	"Don't Be Cruel"	Bobby Brown
24	"Sign Your Name"	Terence Trent D'Arby
25	"Shake Your Thang"	Salt-N-Pepa featuring E.U.
26	"Little Walter"	Tony! Toni! Toné!
27	"Fishnet"	Morris Day
28	"Loosey's Rap"	Rick James featuring Roxanne Shante
29	"My Prerogative"	Bobby Brown
30	"The Way You Love Me"	Karyn White
31	"Groove Me"	Guy
32	"She's on the Left"	Jeffrey Osborne
33	"I Live for Your Love"	Natalie Cole
34	"System of Survival"	Earth, Wind & Fire
35	"Keep Risin' to the Top"	Doug E. Fresh and the Get Fresh Crew
36	"Man in the Mirror"	Michael Jackson
37	"One More Try"	George Michael
38	"Husband"	Shirley Murdock
39	"Watching You"	Loose Ends
40	"Something Just Ain't Right"	Keith Sweat
41	"Paradise"	Sade
42	"If It Isn't Love"	New Edition
43	"Addicted to You"	LeVert
44	"Get Outta My Dreams, Get into My Car"	Billy Ocean
45	"Ooo La La La"	Teena Marie
46	"So Emotional"	Whitney Houston
47	"Where Do Broken Hearts Go"	Whitney Houston
48	"Roses Are Red"	The Mac Band featuring the McCampbell Brothers
49	"Born Not to Know"	Tony! Toni! Toné!
50	"You Will Know"	Stevie Wonder
51	"Someone to Love Me for Me"	Lisa Lisa and Cult Jam
52	"I'm Real"	James Brown
53	"Take Your Time"	Pebbles
54	"That's What Love Is"	Miki Howard
55	"Sweet Sensation"	LeVert
56	"Flirt"	Evelyn "Champagne" King
57	"Some Kind of Lover"	Jody Watley
58	"Another Part of Me"	Michael Jackson
59	"Secret Lady"	Stephanie Mills
60	"Alphabet St."	Prince
61	"Wild Wild West"	Kool Moe Dee
62	"My Girl"	Suave
63	"Don't Rock the Boat"	Midnight Star featuring Ecstasy of Whodini
64	"Lovey Dovey"	Tony Terry
65	"You're Not My Kind of Girl"	New Edition
66	"2 A.M."	Teddy Pendergrass
67	"Love Struck"	Jesse Johnson
68	"Superbad"	Chris Jasper
69	"The Right Stuff"	Vanessa Williams
70	"Lovin' on Next to Nothin'"	Gladys Knight & the Pips
71	"Never Knew Love Like This"	Alexander O'Neal featuring Cherrelle
72	"Off The Hook (With Your Love)"	R. J.'s Latest Arrival
73	"Let Me Touch You"	The O'Jays
74	"Love Will Save the Day"	Whitney Houston
75	"Run to Me"	Angela Winbush
76	"I'll Prove It to You"	Gregory Abbott
77	"Get It"	Stevie Wonder featuring Michael Jackson
78	"Any Love"	Luther Vandross
79	"All In My Mind"	Full Force
80	"That Girl Wants to Dance with Me"	Gregory Hines
81	"Come into My Life"	Joyce Sims
82	"No 1/2 Steppin'"	Shanice
83	"Wasn't I Good to Ya?"	dáKRASH
84	"Rocket 2 U"	The Jets
85	"Pump Up the Volume"	M|A|R|R|S
86	"Wanna Make Love (All Night Long)"	Lillo Thomas
87	"Every Drop of Your Love"	Stacy Lattisaw
88	"The Best of Me"	Kiara
89	"Parents Just Don't Understand"	DJ Jazzy Jeff & the Fresh Prince
90	"Nothing Can Come Between Us"	Sade
91	"Father Figure"	George Michael
92	"Let's Start Love Over"	Miles Jaye
93	"Piano in the Dark"	Brenda Russell featuring Joe Esposito
94	"Pink Cadillac"	Natalie Cole
95	"Thinking of You"	Earth, Wind & Fire
96	"Let's Do It Again"	George Benson
97	"Static"	James Brown
98	"Dirty Diana"	Michael Jackson
99	"Giving You the Best That I Got"	Anita Baker
100	"Knocked Out"	Paula Abdul

== See also ==
- 1988 in music
- Billboard Year-End Hot 100 singles of 1988
- List of Hot Black Singles number ones of 1988
