= List of Hot Black Singles number ones of 1988 =

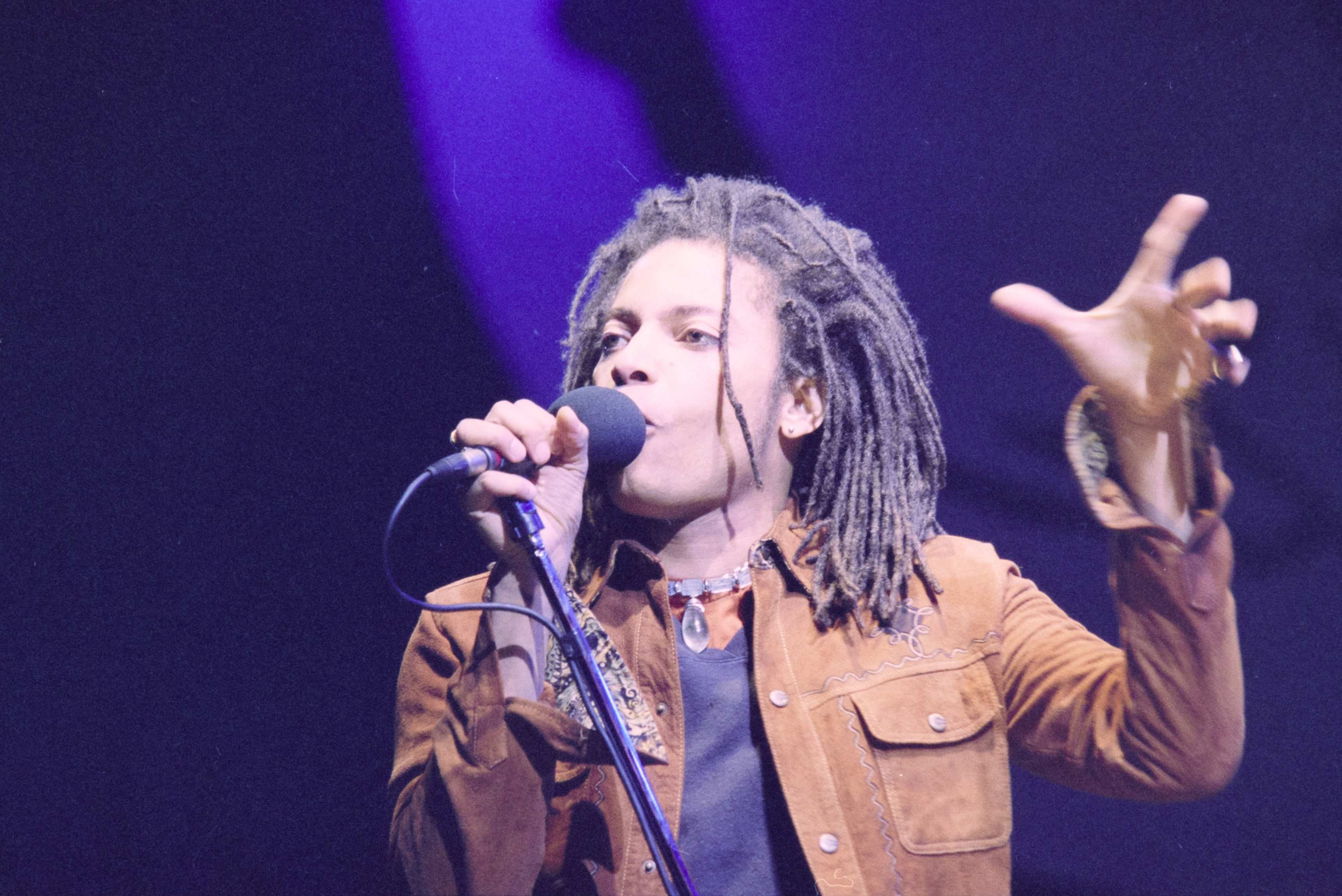
Terence Trent D'Arby (pictured in 2003) was one of many artists to top the chart for the first time in 1988.

Billboard published a weekly chart in 1988 ranking the top-performing singles in the United States in African American–oriented genres; the chart's name has changed over the decades to reflect the evolution of black music and has been published as Hot R&B/Hip-Hop Songs since 2005. In 1988, it was published under the title Hot Black Singles, and 35 different singles reached number one.

In the issue of Billboard dated January 2, Michael Jackson was at number one with "The Way You Make Me Feel", retaining the spot from the final issue of 1987. He also spent time atop the chart in 1988 with "Man in the Mirror" and "Another Part of Me", making him the artist with the most number ones during the year and taking the number of Hot Black Singles chart-toppers from his 1987 album Bad to five. Al B. Sure! had two number ones and tied with Jackson for the most weeks spent by an act at number one, both artists spending five weeks in the peak position. Pebbles, Bobby Brown, and Freddie Jackson (no relation to Michael) all also topped the chart with two singles during the year. In March, Stevie Wonder reached number one with "You Will Know", his 20th single to top the chart, tying him with Aretha Franklin for the most number ones by an artist in the listing's history.

More than half of the acts that topped the chart in 1988 did so for the first time. In the issue dated January 30, Keith Sweat gained his first number one with "I Want Her", which would go on to top Billboard's year-end black singles chart. Terence Trent D'Arby reached number one for the first time with "Wishing Well", as did George Michael with "One More Try". Both tracks also topped Billboard's pop chart, the Hot 100; Michael Jackson's "The Way You Make Me Feel" and "Man in the Mirror" and Billy Ocean's "Get Outta My Dreams, Get into My Car" also topped both listings. "One More Try" was the last in a run of six consecutive first-time Hot Black Singles number ones between April and June, following the debut chart-toppers for E.U., Al B. Sure!, Pebbles, Johnny Kemp, and Tony! Toni! Toné!. Morris Day, Teena Marie, Sade, the Mac Band featuring the McCampbell Brothers, Karyn White, Anita Baker, Cheryl Pepsii Riley, the Boys, and Ziggy Marley and the Melody Makers all also reached number one on the Hot Black Singles listing for the first time, as did the rapper Roxanne Shante when she featured on a chart-topper by Rick James. Jeffrey Osborne achieved his first number one as a solo artist; he had reached number one three times with his band L.T.D. during the previous decade, but "She's on the Left" became his first and only solo single to top the chart when it reached number one in September.

== Chart history ==
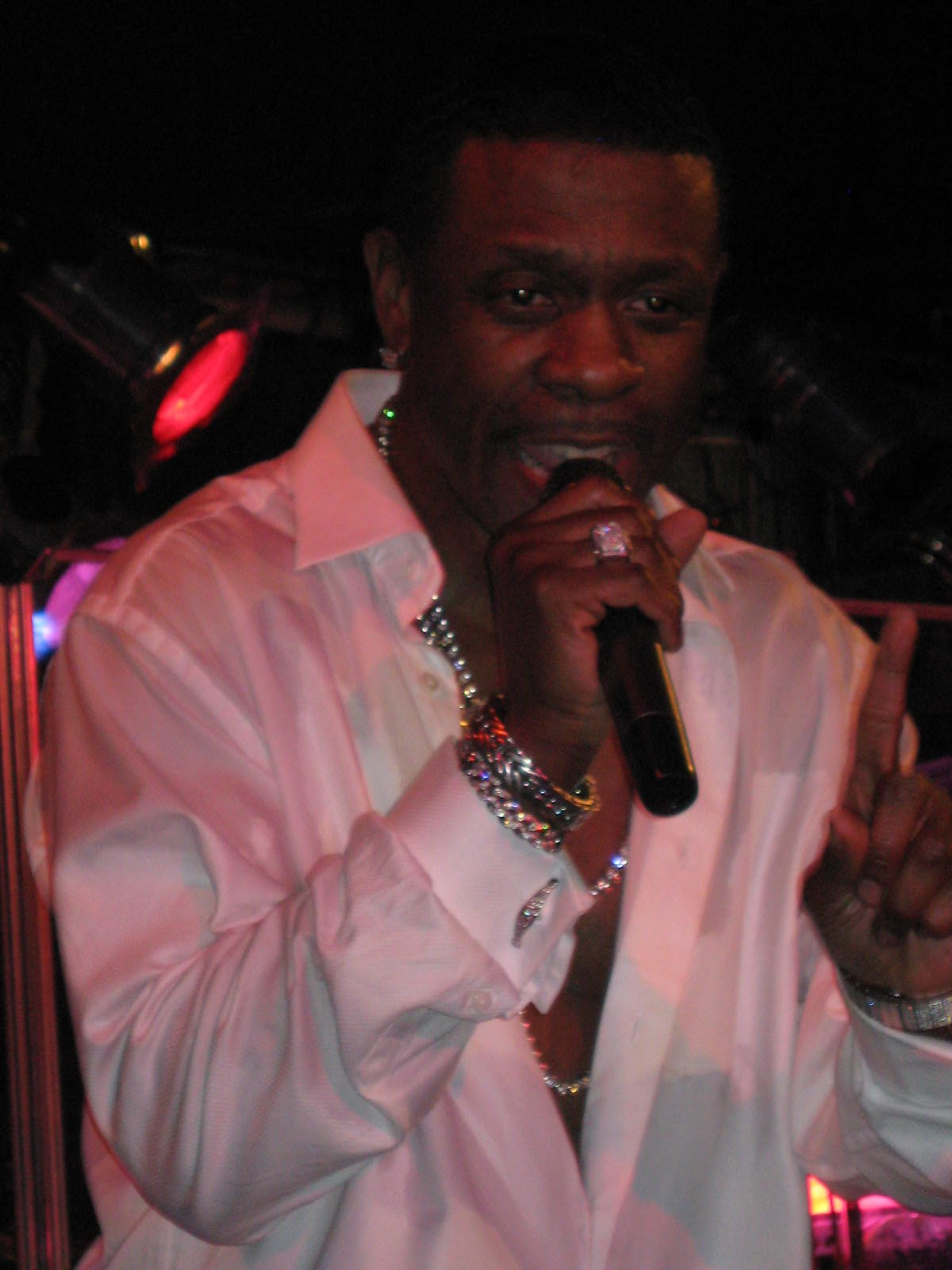
Keith Sweat (pictured in 2009) topped the chart with "I Want Her" which was also number one on Billboard's year-end black singles chart.

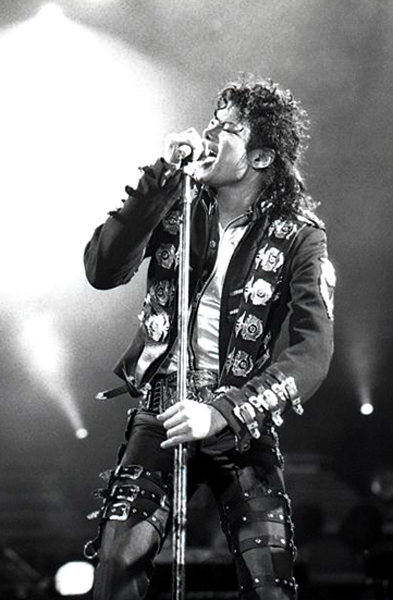
Michael Jackson (pictured in 1988) had three chart toppers during the year: "The Way You Make Me Feel", "Man in the Mirror", and "Another Part of Me".

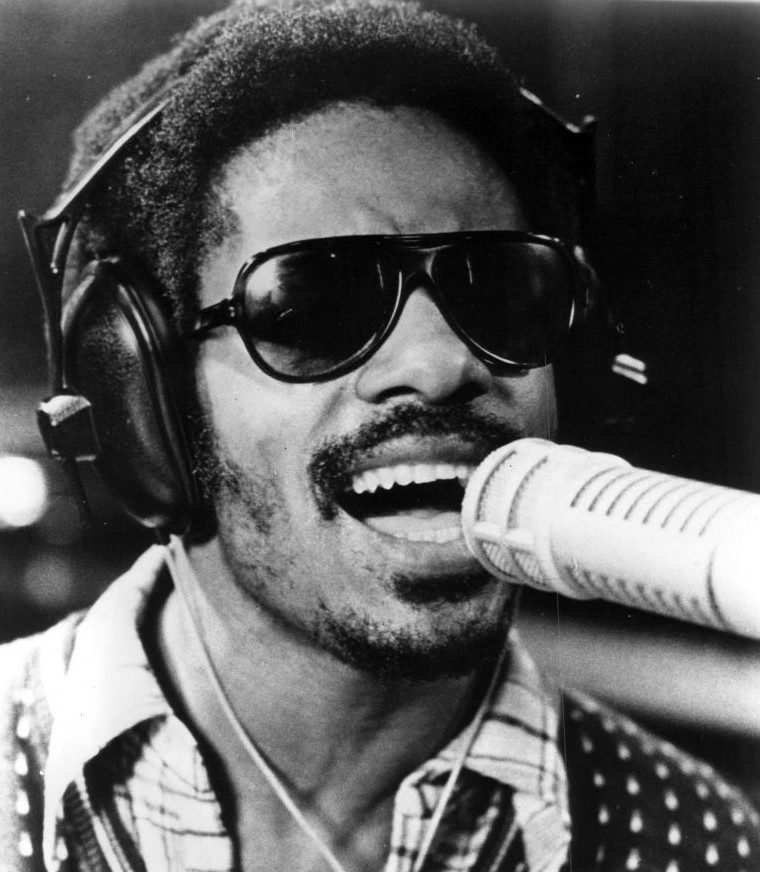
"You Will Know" was the 20th Hot Black Singles chart-topper for Stevie Wonder (pictured in 1973), tying him with Aretha Franklin for the most number ones on the chart.

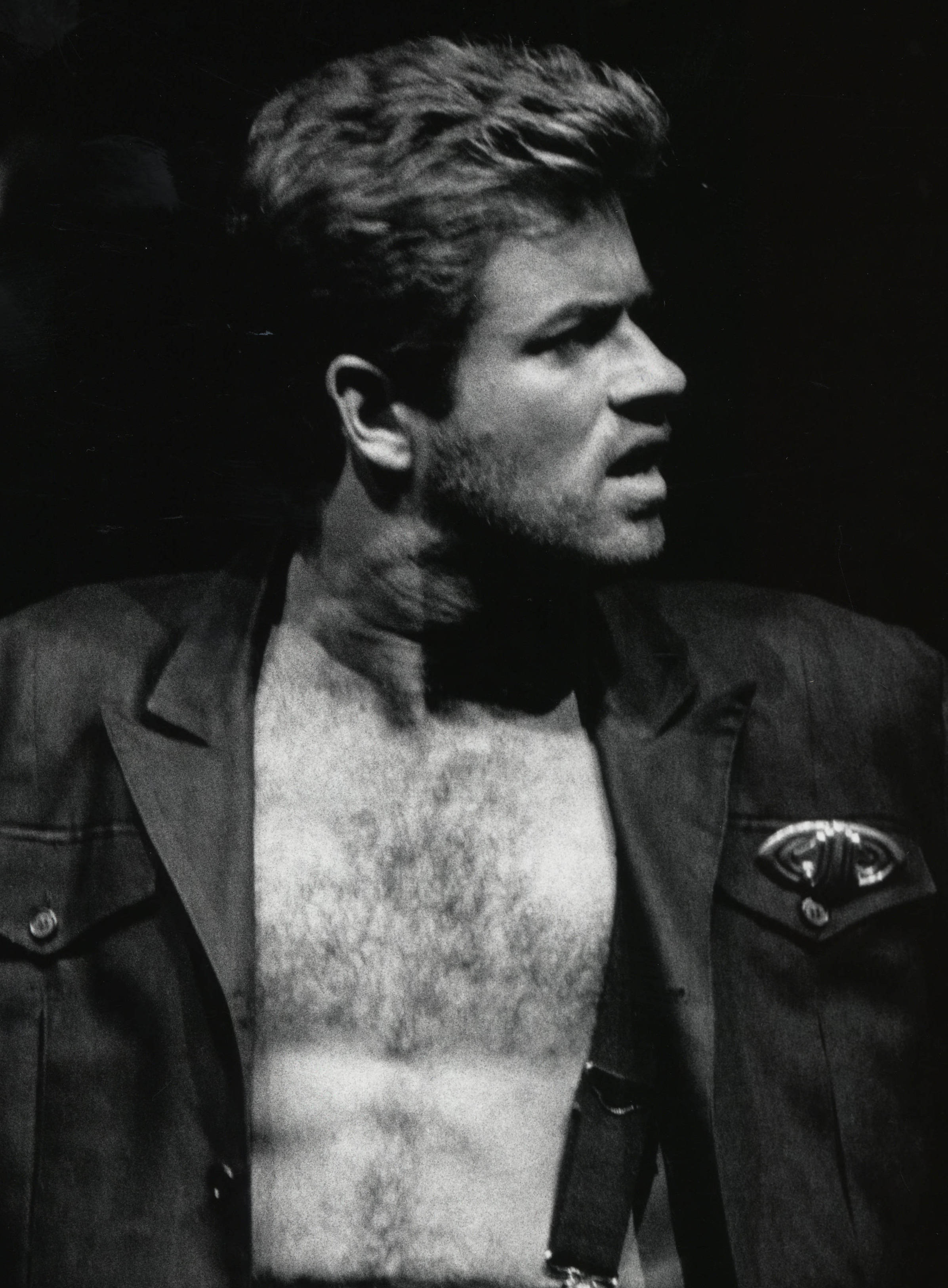
British singer George Michael (pictured in 1988) topped the chart for the first time.

Key
†	Indicates number 1 on Billboard's year-end black singles chart

Chart history
Issue date	Title	Artist(s)	Ref.
January 2	"The Way You Make Me Feel"	Michael Jackson	
January 9	"The Way You Make Me Feel"	Michael Jackson	
January 16	"The Way You Make Me Feel"	Michael Jackson	
January 23	"Love Overboard"	Gladys Knight & the Pips	
January 30	"I Want Her" †	Keith Sweat	
February 6	"I Want Her" †	Keith Sweat	
February 13	"I Want Her" †	Keith Sweat	
February 20	"Girlfriend"	Pebbles	
February 27	"Girlfriend"	Pebbles	
March 5	"You Will Know"	Stevie Wonder	
March 12	"Fishnet"	Morris Day	
March 19	"Fishnet"	Morris Day	
March 26	"Man in the Mirror"	Michael Jackson	
April 2	"Wishing Well"	Terence Trent D'Arby	
April 9	"Ooo La La La"	Teena Marie	
April 16	"Get Outta My Dreams, Get into My Car"	Billy Ocean	
April 23	"Da Butt"	E.U.	
April 30	"Nite and Day"	Al B. Sure!	
May 7	"Nite and Day"	Al B. Sure!	
May 14	"Nite and Day"	Al B. Sure!	
May 21	"Mercedes Boy"	Pebbles	
May 28	"Just Got Paid"	Johnny Kemp	
June 4	"Just Got Paid"	Johnny Kemp	
June 11	"Little Walter"	Tony! Toni! Toné!	
June 18	"One More Try"	George Michael	
June 25	"Joy"	Teddy Pendergrass	
July 2	"Joy"	Teddy Pendergrass	
July 9	"Paradise"	Sade	
July 16	"Roses Are Red"	The Mac Band featuring the McCampbell Brothers	
July 23	"Don't Be Cruel"	Bobby Brown	
July 30	"Don't Be Cruel"	Bobby Brown	
August 6	"Off on Your Own (Girl)"	Al B. Sure!	
August 13	"Off on Your Own (Girl)"	Al B. Sure!	
August 20	"Loosey's Rap"	Rick James featuring Roxanne Shante	
August 27	"Nice 'n' Slow"	Freddie Jackson	
September 3	"Nice 'n' Slow"	Freddie Jackson	
September 10	"Nice 'n' Slow"	Freddie Jackson	
September 17	"Another Part of Me"	Michael Jackson	
September 24	"She's on the Left"	Jeffrey Osborne	
October 1	"Addicted to You"	LeVert	
October 8	"Addicted to You"	LeVert	
October 15	"My Prerogative"	Bobby Brown	
October 22	"My Prerogative"	Bobby Brown	
October 29	"The Way You Love Me"	Karyn White	
November 5	"Any Love"	Luther Vandross	
November 12	"Giving You the Best That I Got"	Anita Baker	
November 19	"Giving You the Best That I Got"	Anita Baker	
November 26	"Thanks for My Child"	Cheryl Pepsii Riley	
December 3	"Hey Lover"	Freddie Jackson	
December 10	"Dial My Heart"	The Boys	
December 17	"Everything I Miss at Home"	Cherrelle	
December 24	"Tumblin' Down"	Ziggy Marley and the Melody Makers	
December 31	"Tumblin' Down"	Ziggy Marley and the Melody Makers	

== See also ==
- 1988 in music
- Billboard Year-End Hot Black Singles of 1988
- Lists of Billboard number-one rhythm and blues hits
- List of Billboard number-one R&B albums of 1988
