= Go Home (song) =

Single by Stevie Wonder

from the album In Square Circle
- B-side: "Instrumental"
- Released: October 1985
- Recorded: 1983, 1985
- Genre: R&B; dance-pop; funk
- Length: 5:18 (album version); 4:18 (7" version); 9:22 (12" version)
- Label: Tamla
- Songwriter: Stevie Wonder
- Producer: Stevie Wonder

Stevie Wonder singles chronology
"That's What Friends Are For" (1985)	"Go Home" (1985)	"Overjoyed" (1986)

"Go Home" is a song by Stevie Wonder, released as the second single from his twentieth studio album, In Square Circle (1985). The song showcased the narrator's plea to a young woman to go home, though the girl tries to get the narrator to stay with her. In the US, the song peaked at #2 on the Billboard R&B chart and #10 on the Billboard Hot 100 and, to date, is Wonder's last song to reach the US top ten on the Hot 100. "Go Home" also topped both the Billboard dance chart and the Billboard Adult Contemporary chart.

The song was originally intended for his aborted album People Move, Human Play. Stevie performed this song as early as the May 7, 1983, episode of Saturday Night Live and nearly two years later at the 1985 Grammy Awards ceremony in Los Angeles, California, in a synthesizer jam with other contemporaries Howard Jones, Herbie Hancock, and Thomas Dolby. Like "Part-Time Lover," the song was released with a special 12-inch version, which demonstrated Wonder's ability to reverse-sample.

Billboard called it a "darker follow up" to "Part-Time Lover" that is "more subtle and affecting."

== Personnel ==
- Stevie Wonder – lead vocal, background vocal, synthesizers, drums, vocoder
- Bob Malach – saxophone
- Larry Gittens - trumpet

== Charts ==
=== Weekly charts ===
Chart (1985–1986)	Peak position
Australia (Kent Music Report)	92
Belgium (Ultratop 50 Flanders)	25
Canada (RPM)	31
Finland (Suomen virallinen lista)	16
UK Singles (OCC)	67
US Billboard Hot 100	10
US Hot R&B/Hip-Hop Songs (Billboard)	2
US Adult Contemporary (Billboard)	1
US Dance Club Songs (Billboard)	1
US Cash Box Top 100	12

=== Year-end charts ===
Chart (1986)	Rank
US Billboard Hot 100	100

== Cover versions ==
Instrumental group Groovopolis, led by guitarist Chris Cortez, covered the song for their self-titled first and only album in 2002.

Steve Khan: Backlog 2017

== See also ==
- List of number-one dance singles of 1986 (U.S.)
- List of number-one adult contemporary singles of 1986 (U.S.)
