= My Love (Julio Iglesias song) =

1988 single by Julio Iglesias

Single by Julio Iglesias featuring Stevie Wonder

from the album Non Stop
- B-side: "Words and Music" (7-inch) "Begin the Beguine (Volver a Empezar)", "Hey" (12-inch)
- Released: May 1988
- Genre: Pop
- Length: 4:58
- Label: CBS
- Songwriter: Stevie Wonder
- Producers: Humberto Gatica; Stevie Wonder

Julio Iglesias singles chronology
"Love Is on Our Side Again" (1988)	"My Love" (1988)	"Spanish Eyes" (1989)

Stevie Wonder singles chronology
"Get It" (1987)	"My Love" (1988)	"You Will Know" (1988)

"My Love" is a song performed by Spanish singer/songwriter Julio Iglesias, written by and featuring American musician Stevie Wonder. It was released as a single in 1988 from Iglesias' album, Non Stop. The duet was a top 5 hit in the UK and Ireland, reaching numbers 5 and 2, respectively. In the U.S., it reached No. 80 on the Billboard Hot 100, and No. 14 on the Adult Contemporary chart.

== Track listings ==
7-inch

1. "My Love" (featuring Stevie Wonder) – 4:58
2. "Words and Music" – 4:34

7-inch EP & CD single

1. "My Love" (featuring Stevie Wonder) – 4:58
2. "Words and Music" – 4:34
3. "To All the Girls I've Loved Before" (featuring Willie Nelson) – 3:30
4. "All of You" (featuring Diana Ross) – 3:57

12-inch

1. "My Love" (featuring Stevie Wonder) – 4:58
2. "Words and Music" – 4:34
3. "Begin the Beguine (Volver a Empezar)" – 4:45
4. "Hey!" – 3:50

== Charts ==
=== Weekly charts ===
Weekly chart performance for "My Love"
Chart (1988)	Peak position
Australia (ARIA)	39
Belgium (Ultratop 50 Flanders)	8
Canada Top Singles (RPM)	34
Canada Adult Contemporary (RPM)	21
Ireland (IRMA)	2
Italy Airplay (Music & Media)	19
Netherlands (Dutch Top 40)	17
Netherlands (Single Top 100)	16
Spain (AFYVE)	4
UK Singles (Official Charts)	5
US Billboard Hot 100	80
US Adult Contemporary (Billboard)	14
US Hot R&B/Hip-Hop Songs (Billboard)	88
