= List of Hot Adult Contemporary number ones of 1986 =

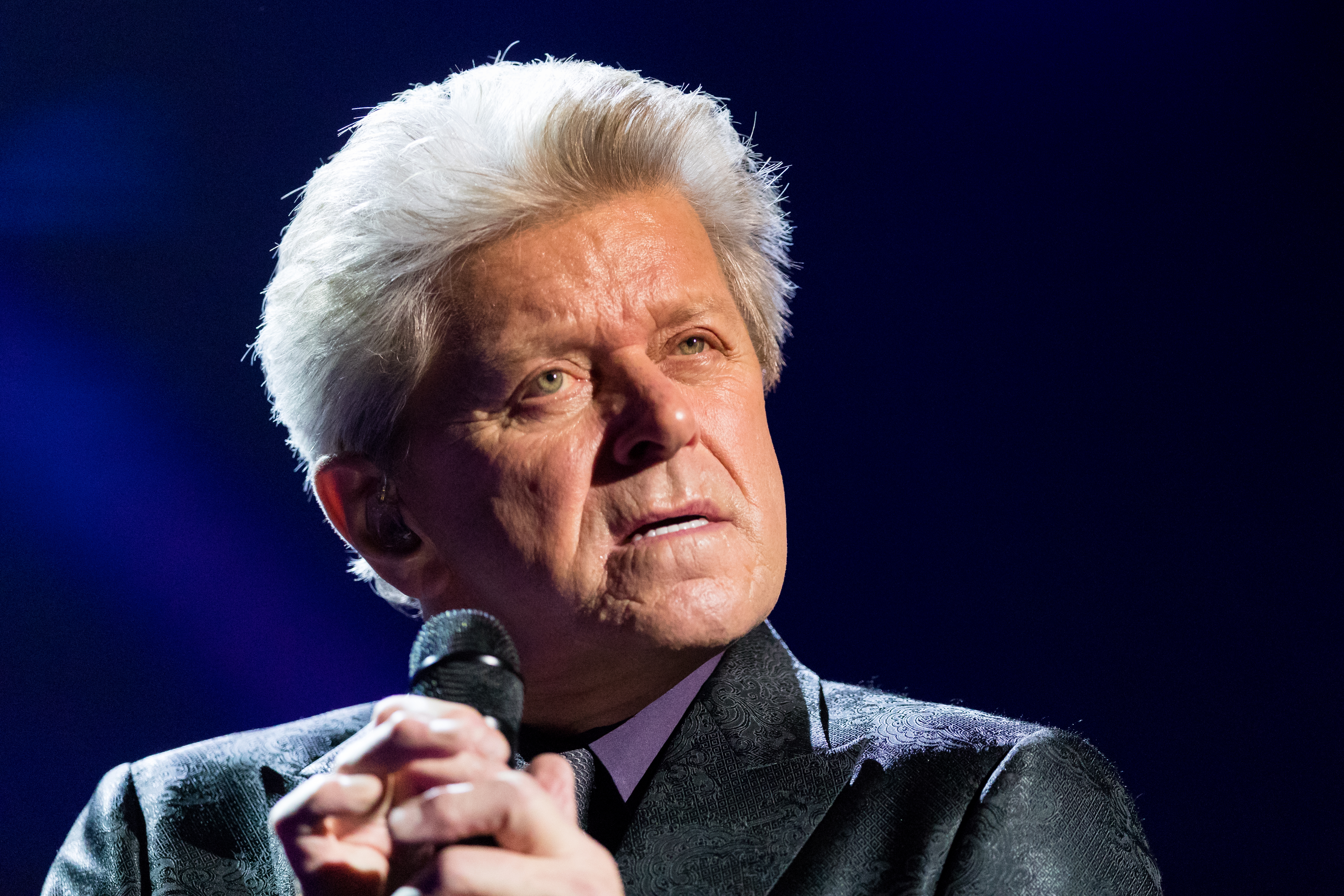
Peter Cetera, who had recently left the band Chicago to go solo, spent seven weeks at number one, the most by any act.

In 1986, Billboard magazine published a chart ranking the top-performing songs in the United States in the adult contemporary music (AC) market. The chart, which in 1986 was published under the title Hot Adult Contemporary, has undergone various name changes during its history but has been published as Adult Contemporary since 1996. In 1986, 25 songs topped the chart based on playlists submitted by radio stations.

In the year's first issue of Billboard, the number one song was "Say You, Say Me" by Lionel Richie, which was in its fifth week at number one. It was replaced a week later by "That's What Friends Are For" by Dionne & Friends. A charity single intended to raise funds for HIV/AIDS-related causes, the song was performed by Dionne Warwick, Elton John, Gladys Knight and Stevie Wonder. After two weeks in the top spot, it was replaced by Wonder's solo single "Go Home". Three months later, Wonder returned to number one with "Overjoyed", making him the only artist to achieve three AC chart-toppers in 1986. Among the acts to top the chart for the first time during the year was the pairing of Gloria Loring and Carl Anderson. Loring portrayed the character Liz Chandler on the soap opera Days of Our Lives and, in her role as a singer, performed the song "Friends and Lovers" with guest star Anderson in 1985. The song was not initially released commercially, but after a version by Eddie Rabbitt and Juice Newton entered the country charts, Loring and Anderson's recording was released and topped the AC chart in September 1986. Rabbitt and Newton's version of the song topped Billboard's Hot Country Singles chart in October, meaning that versions of the same song by two different acts were number ones in their respective genres within a month of each other.

Peter Cetera had the highest total number of weeks at number one in 1986 with seven. After nearly two decades as lead singer of the band Chicago, he had departed the group for a solo career in 1985. He spent five weeks atop the chart in July and August 1986 with his first single since quitting Chicago, "Glory of Love", and returned to number one for two weeks in November with "The Next Time I Fall", a duet with Amy Grant. "Glory of Love", from the soundtrack of the film The Karate Kid Part II, tied for the year's longest unbroken run at number one with Whitney Houston's "Greatest Love of All". Both songs also topped Billboard's pop singles chart, the Hot 100, as did eight of the year's other AC chart-toppers. The year's final Hot Adult Contemporary number one was "Love Is Forever" by Billy Ocean, which held the top spot for the final two weeks of 1986. It was the second chart-topper of the year for the Trinidad-born singer. "That's What Friends Are For" topped Billboard's Year-End AC chart.

== Chart history ==
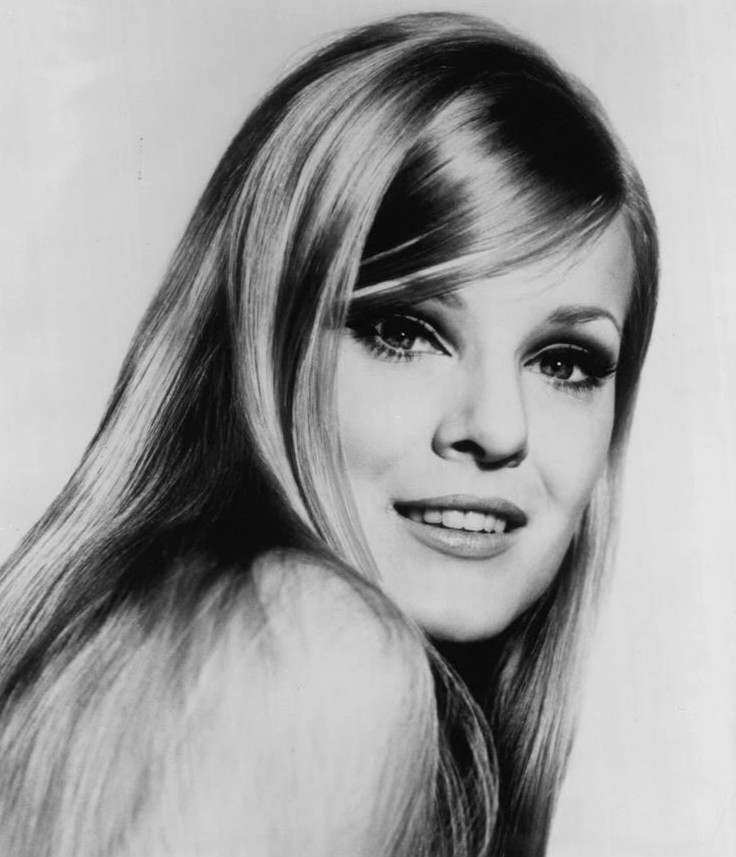
Gloria Loring, one of the stars of the soap opera Days of Our Lives, topped the chart with "Friends and Lovers", a duet with Carl Anderson which had originally been performed on the show.

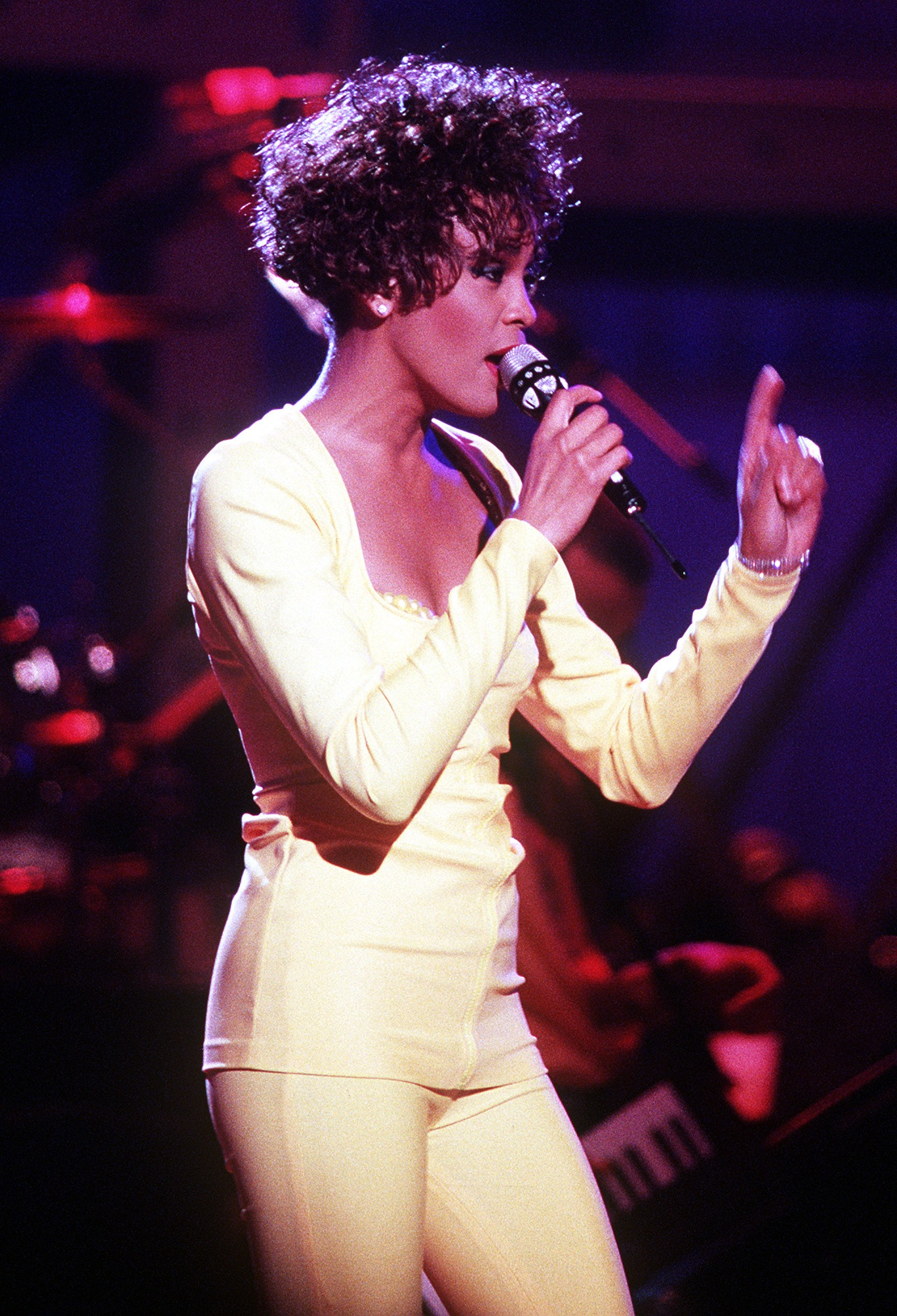
Whitney Houston spent six weeks atop the chart.

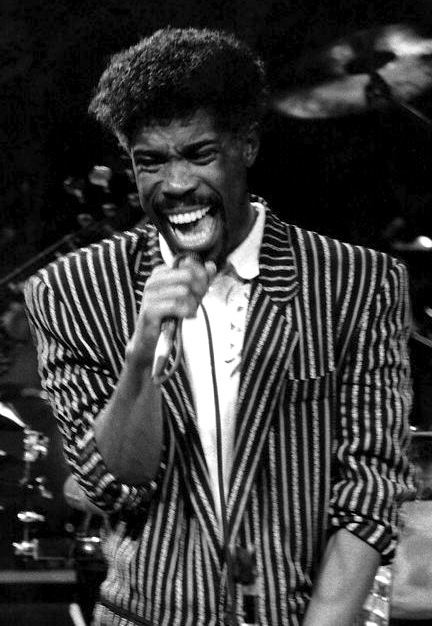
Billy Ocean ended the year at number one.

Chart history
Issue date	Title	Artist(s)	Ref.
January 4	"Say You, Say Me"	Lionel Richie	
January 11	"That's What Friends Are For"	Dionne & Friends^{[a]}	
January 18	"That's What Friends Are For"	Dionne & Friends^{[a]}	
January 25	"Go Home"	Stevie Wonder	
February 1	"My Hometown"	Bruce Springsteen	
February 8	"The Sweetest Taboo"	Sade	
February 15	"How Will I Know"	Whitney Houston	
February 22	"Sara"	Starship	
March 1	"Sara"	Starship	
March 8	"Sara"	Starship	
March 15	"These Dreams"	Heart	
March 22	"These Dreams"	Heart	
March 29	"These Dreams"	Heart	
April 5	"Secret Lovers"	Atlantic Starr	
April 12	"Overjoyed"	Stevie Wonder	
April 19	"Overjoyed"	Stevie Wonder	
April 26	"Greatest Love of All"	Whitney Houston	
May 3	"Greatest Love of All"	Whitney Houston	
May 10	"Greatest Love of All"	Whitney Houston	
May 17	"Greatest Love of All"	Whitney Houston	
May 24	"Greatest Love of All"	Whitney Houston	
May 31	"Live to Tell"	Madonna	
June 7	"Live to Tell"	Madonna	
June 14	"Live to Tell"	Madonna	
June 21	"There'll Be Sad Songs (To Make You Cry)"	Billy Ocean	
June 28	"No One Is to Blame"	Howard Jones	
July 5	"Your Wildest Dreams"	The Moody Blues	
July 12	"Your Wildest Dreams"	The Moody Blues	
July 19	"Glory of Love"	Peter Cetera	
July 26	"Glory of Love"	Peter Cetera	
August 2	"Glory of Love"	Peter Cetera	
August 9	"Glory of Love"	Peter Cetera	
August 16	"Glory of Love"	Peter Cetera	
August 23	"Words Get in the Way"	Miami Sound Machine	
August 30	"Words Get in the Way"	Miami Sound Machine	
September 6	"Friends and Lovers"	Gloria Loring and Carl Anderson	
September 13	"Friends and Lovers"	Gloria Loring and Carl Anderson	
September 20	"Stuck with You"	Huey Lewis and the News	
September 27	"Stuck with You"	Huey Lewis and the News	
October 4	"Stuck with You"	Huey Lewis and the News	
October 11	"Throwing It All Away"	Genesis	
October 18	"Throwing It All Away"	Genesis	
October 25	"I'll Be Over You"	Toto	
November 1	"I'll Be Over You"	Toto	
November 8	"The Next Time I Fall"	Peter Cetera and Amy Grant	
November 15	"The Next Time I Fall"	Peter Cetera and Amy Grant	
November 22	"Love Will Conquer All"	Lionel Richie	
November 29	"Love Will Conquer All"	Lionel Richie	
December 6	"The Way It Is"	Bruce Hornsby and the Range	
December 13	"The Way It Is"	Bruce Hornsby and the Range	
December 20	"Love Is Forever"	Billy Ocean	
December 27	"Love Is Forever"	Billy Ocean	

a. Dionne & Friends consisted of Dionne Warwick, Elton John, Gladys Knight and Stevie Wonder

== See also ==
- 1986 in music
- List of artists who reached number one on the U.S. Adult Contemporary chart
