= List of Billboard number-one R&B albums of 1988 =

These are the Billboard magazine R&B albums that reached number one in 1988.

== Chart history ==
Issue date	Album	Artist
January 2	Bad	Michael Jackson
January 9	Bad	Michael Jackson
January 16	Bad	Michael Jackson
January 23	Characters	Stevie Wonder
January 30	Characters	Stevie Wonder
February 6	Characters	Stevie Wonder
February 13	Characters	Stevie Wonder
February 20	Characters	Stevie Wonder
February 27	All Our Love	Gladys Knight & the Pips
March 5	All Our Love	Gladys Knight & the Pips
March 12	Characters	Stevie Wonder
March 19	Make It Last Forever	Keith Sweat
March 26	Make It Last Forever	Keith Sweat
April 2	Make It Last Forever	Keith Sweat
April 9	Bad	Michael Jackson
April 16	Bad	Michael Jackson
April 23	Bad	Michael Jackson
April 30	Introducing the Hardline According to Terence Trent D'Arby	Terence Trent D'Arby
May 7	Introducing the Hardline According to Terence Trent D'Arby	Terence Trent D'Arby
May 14	Introducing the Hardline According to Terence Trent D'Arby	Terence Trent D'Arby
May 21	Faith	George Michael
May 28	Faith	George Michael
June 4	Faith	George Michael
June 11	Faith	George Michael
June 18	Faith	George Michael
June 25	Faith	George Michael
July 2	In Effect Mode	Al B. Sure!
July 9	In Effect Mode	Al B. Sure!
July 16	In Effect Mode	Al B. Sure!
July 23	In Effect Mode	Al B. Sure!
July 30	In Effect Mode	Al B. Sure!
August 6	In Effect Mode	Al B. Sure!
August 13	In Effect Mode	Al B. Sure!
August 20	Strictly Business	EPMD
August 27	Strictly Business	EPMD
September 3	Strictly Business	EPMD
September 10	Don't Be Cruel	Bobby Brown
September 17	Don't Be Cruel	Bobby Brown
September 24	It Takes a Nation of Millions to Hold Us Back	Public Enemy
October 1	Don't Be Cruel	Bobby Brown
October 8	Don't Be Cruel	Bobby Brown
October 15	Don't Let Love Slip Away	Freddie Jackson
October 22	Don't Be Cruel	Bobby Brown
October 29	Don't Be Cruel	Bobby Brown
November 5	Don't Be Cruel	Bobby Brown
November 12	Don't Be Cruel	Bobby Brown
November 19	Giving You the Best That I Got	Anita Baker
November 26	Any Love	Luther Vandross
December 3	Any Love	Luther Vandross
December 10	Giving You the Best That I Got	Anita Baker
December 17	Giving You the Best That I Got	Anita Baker
December 24	Giving You the Best That I Got	Anita Baker
December 31	Giving You the Best That I Got	Anita Baker

== See also ==
- 1988 in music
- R&B number-one hits of 1988 (USA)
