= Non Stop (Julio Iglesias album) =

Studio album by Julio Iglesias
- Released: 1988
- Recorded: Lion Share, Los Angeles; Lighthouse Recorders; Sunset Sound, Hollywood; Criteria, Miami; Compass Point, Nassau, Bahamas; AIR, London; Ocean Way, Hollywood; Rhett's Place
- Genre: Latin pop
- Length: 38:48
- Label: Columbia
- Producer: Humberto Gatica (tracks 1–6), Tony Renis (tracks 2–4), Ramon Arcusa (tracks 7–9), Julio Iglesias (tracks 3 and 4), Stevie Wonder (track 6 co-producer)

Julio Iglesias chronology
Tutto l'amore che ti manca (1987)	Non Stop (1988)	Raíces (1989)

Non Stop is a Julio Iglesias studio album released in 1988 on Columbia Records. This was his second primarily English-language album since 1984's 1100 Bel Air Place. The album peaked at No. 11 on the US Billboard Latin Pop Albums chart and No. 33 on the UK Pop Albums chart. Non Stop was also certified gold, in the US by the RIAA and the UK by the BPI.

== Overview ==
A song called "My Love" feat. Stevie Wonder reached No. 14 on the US Billboard Adult Contemporary Songs chart and No. 5 on the UK Pop Singles chart.

== Track listing ==
No.	Title	Writer(s)	Producer(s)	Length
1.	"Love Is on Our Side Again"	Barry Mann, Jim Sullins	Humberto Gatica	4:01
2.	"I Know It's Over"	Giorgio Calabrese, Antonina Armato	Gatica, Tony Renis, Julio Iglesias	3:53
3.	"Never, Never, Never (Grande, Grande, Grande)"	Alberto Testa, Norman Newell, Fabio Testa	Gatica, Renis, Iglesias	4:03
4.	"Ae, Ao"	Renis, Massimo Guantini, Rhett Lawrence, Debbie James-Chacon	Gatica, Iglesias, Renis	4:12
5.	"Words and Music"	Clif Magness, Mark Vieha	Gatica	4:34
6.	"My Love (with Stevie Wonder)"	Wonder	Wonder, Gatica	5:36
7.	"Everytime We Fall in Love"	Claude Lemesle, Luis Gardey, James-Chacon	Arcusa	4:04
8.	"Too Many Women"	Arcusa, Marty Panzer	Arcusa	4:12
9.	"If I Ever Needed You (I Need You Now)"	Dobie Gray, Bud Reneau	Arcusa	3:44
Total length:				38:48

== Certifications ==
Region	Certification	Certified units/sales
Australia (ARIA)	Gold	35,000^{^}
Brazil (Pro-Música Brasil)	Platinum	250,000^{*}
Canada (Music Canada)	Gold	50,000^{^}
Malaysia	Platinum	
New Zealand (RMNZ)	Gold	7,500^{^}
Spain (PROMUSICAE)	Platinum	100,000^{^}
United Kingdom (BPI)	2× Gold	200,000^{^}
United States (RIAA)	Gold	850,000
^{*} Sales figures based on certification alone.^{^} Shipments figures based on certification alone.

== See also ==
- List of most expensive albums
