= Overjoyed (Stevie Wonder song) =

1985 single by Stevie Wonder

Single by Stevie Wonder

from the album In Square Circle
- B-side: "Instrumental"
- Released: December 1985
- Recorded: 1985
- Genre: R&B; quiet storm
- Length: 3:41
- Label: Tamla
- Songwriter: Stevie Wonder
- Producer: Stevie Wonder

Stevie Wonder singles chronology
"Part-Time Lover" (1985)	"Overjoyed" (1985)	"Land of La La" (1986)

"Overjoyed" is a song written and performed by American R&B singer-songwriter Stevie Wonder on the Tamla (Motown) label from his 1985 album In Square Circle. The single peaked at No. 24 on the Billboard Hot 100 chart in April 1986, remaining in the Top 40 for six weeks. In addition, "Overjoyed" was a No. 1 hit on the adult contemporary chart, the eighth (and, to date, last) of his career. An alternate single release featured an instrumental version on the B-side.

The song was written for the 1979 album Journey Through "The Secret Life of Plants", but was left off the album and re-recorded for the 1985 album In Square Circle. In the liner notes for the song, "crickets, nightingale & additional bird sounds, ocean, pebbles in pond, stone dropped, crushing leaves" are listed under "environmental percussion". The song was first performed live on the May 7, 1983, episode of Saturday Night Live, where Wonder was the host and musical guest.

Billboard said that it "dresses Wonder's usual wordplay in unusual audio effects."

== Personnel ==
- Stevie Wonder – lead vocal, background vocal, acoustic piano, environmental percussion (incl.: crickets, bird sounds, ocean, pebbles in pond, stone dropped, crushing leaves), Yamaha CS-80 synthesizer
- Earl Klugh – guitar
- Paul Riser – string arrangement

== Charts ==
Chart (1986)	Peak position
Belgium (Ultratop 50 Flanders)	33
Canada (RPM)	55
Ireland (IRMA)	10
UK Singles (Official Charts)	17
US Billboard Hot 100	24
US Adult Contemporary (Billboard)	1
US Hot R&B/Hip-Hop Songs (Billboard)	8

== Cover versions ==
- Bassist Stanley Clarke recorded a cover for his 1986 album Hideaway.
- Diana Ross covered it for her 1994 Christmas album, A Very Special Season.
- Mary J. Blige recorded a cover of the song in the late 1990s, produced and arranged by Wonder himself. It debuted in a 1999 Air Jordan XV commercial, and Blige subsequently performed it during the 2000 NBA All-Star Game halftime show in February 2000 as well as during The BET 20th Anniversary Celebration in May 2000. It was first released in 2000 on a Japan-exclusive compilation, Ballads, and later released worldwide in 2003 on the Stevie Wonder tribute album, Conception: An Interpretation of Stevie Wonder's Songs.
- Jane Monheit included a cover of the song in her 2007 album Surrender.
- Grover Washington Jr. included the song in his 1994 album All My Tomorrows.
- Bass virtuoso Victor Wooten included an instrumental cover of the song on his 1996 album A Show of Hands.
- R&B group Profyle covered the song on their 1999 debut album, Whispers in the Dark.
- Guitarist Blake Aaron covered the song on his 2002 album With Every Touch.
- Belgian-French singer Viktor Lazlo recorded the song for her 2002 album Amour(s).
- In 2009, jazz artist Esperanza Spalding covered the song at the White House at an event to commemorate Stevie Wonder's music.
- Progressive metal guitarist Drewsif Stalin recorded a cover of the song for his 2011 EP, Excursion.
- A version of the song by British pop group Steps appears on their 2012 festive-themed album, Light Up the World.
- From 2011 to 2014, Canadian singer Celine Dion covered the song on her residency show Celine as a virtual duet with Wonder. A duet cover version with him appears on her 2013 studio album Loved Me Back to Life. Jon Maranica of The New York Times commented on the album version that the two's singing styles are "on paper ... a severe mismatch", but when "Wonder shimmies, she shimmies back, dodging her own shadow".
- Bassist Nathan East covered the song in 2014 on his self entitled album, Nathan East, with Stevie Wonder himself playing the harmonica.
- Evan McKeel performed a cover of this song during the second night of the live shows of The Voice (USA) season 9, aired November 10, 2015.
- Victory Boyd released album 'It's A New Dawn' in November 2017, containing cover version of this song.
- In 2019, musician Ben Platt covered the song at his one-night-only concert at Radio City Music Hall.
- In 2022, pianist Vijay Iyer recorded a cover of the song, with Tyshawn Sorey and Linda May Han Oh for the album Compassion, which was released in 2024.
- In November 2025, Spanish singer Claudia Arenas performed a cover of the song during the television talent show Operación Triunfo 2025.

== See also ==
- List of Hot Adult Contemporary number ones of 1986
