= Hey Lover (Freddie Jackson song) =

Single by Freddie Jackson

from the album Don't Let Love Slip Away
- B-side: "Look Around"
- Released: 1988
- Genre: R&B; soul
- Length: 5:12
- Label: Capitol
- Songwriters: Keith Washington; Arthur "Sonny" Moore
- Producers: Paul Laurence; Darryl Shepard

Freddie Jackson singles chronology
"Nice 'n' Slow" (1988)	"Hey Lover" (1988)	"You and I Got a Thang" (1989)

"Hey Lover" is a ballad song by American singer Freddie Jackson. Co-written by up-and-coming singer/songwriter Keith Washington (who would have his breakthrough as a recording artist three years later with the song "Kissing You") and Arthur "Sonny" Moore.

The single was Jackson's follow-up to "Nice 'N' Slow" on the album Don't Let Love Slip Away, and like his previous single, "Hey Lover" peak to number one on the US Top Black Singles chart.

== Track listings and formats ==
- US 7" vinyl single

A. "Hey Lover" (Radio Edit) – 4:25
B. "Look Around" (Radio Edit) – 4:16

- US 12" vinyl single

A. "Hey Lover" – 5:02
B1. "Hey Lover" (Edit) – 4:25
B2. "Look Around" (Edit) – 4:16

== Credits ==
- Producer, Arranger – Paul Laurence
- Co-Producer, Programming – Darryl Shepard
- Vocals – Freddie Jackson
- Writer – Arthur S. Moore, Keith Washington
- Backing Vocals – Cindy Mizelle, Audrey Wheeler, Yolanda Lee
- Executive-Producer – Beau Higgins, Freddie Jackson

== Charts ==
Chart (1988)	Peak position
US Hot R&B/Hip-Hop Songs (Billboard)	1

== See also ==
- List of number-one R&B singles of 1988 (U.S.)
