= Tutto l'amore che ti manca =

Studio album by Julio Iglesias
- Released: 1987
- Genre: Love songs, pop
- Label: CBS
- Producer: Ramon Arcusa (tracks 1, 3, 5 and 6); Manuel Alejandro and David Beigbeder (all others)

Julio Iglesias chronology
| Un hombre solo (1987) | Tutto l'amore che ti manca (1987) | Non Stop (1988) |

Tutto l'amore che ti manca is a 1987 album by Julio Iglesias.

== Track listing ==
| No. | Title | Length |
|---|---|---|
| 1. | "Un padre come me" | 4:06 |
| 2. | "Tutto l'amore che ti manca (Todo el amor que te hace falta)" | 4:35 |
| 3. | "America (Italiano)" | 4:28 |
| 4. | "Evadendomi (Evadiéndome)" | 3:51 |
| 5. | "Il miele in corpo" | 3:17 |
| 6. | "Se mi dai una mano tu" | 4:01 |
| 7. | "Innocenza selvaggia" | 4:18 |
| 8. | "Compagna antagonista" | 4:05 |
| 9. | "Un uomo solo" | 3:52 |
| 10. | "Se vuoi continuare così" | 4:08 |

== Certifications and sales ==
| Region | Certification | Certified units/sales |
|---|---|---|
| Italy | — | 300,000 |
