= Characters (Stevie Wonder album) =

1987 studio album by Stevie Wonder

Studio album by Stevie Wonder
- Released: November 6, 1987
- Recorded: 1986–1987
- Studios: Wonderland (Los Angeles, California); 1 Der 1 Mobile Unit; Westside Studios (London)
- Genres: R&B, pop
- Length: 48:34 (LP); 60:59 (CD)
- Label: Tamla
- Producers: Stevie Wonder; Quincy Jones; Gary Olazabal

Stevie Wonder chronology
In Square Circle (1985)	Characters (1987)	Jungle Fever (1991)

Singles from Characters
- 1. "Skeletons" Released: September 1987; 2. "You Will Know" Released: March 1988; 3. "Get It" Released: May 5, 1988; 4. "My Eyes Don't Cry" Released: August 1988; 5. "With Each Beat of My Heart" Released: November 1988; 6. "Free" Released: February 1989

Professional ratings
Review scores
Source	Rating
AllMusic	2.5/5 stars
Chicago Tribune	(favorable)
Robert Christgau	A−
Los Angeles Times	3/4 stars
MusicHound	3/5 stars
New Musical Express	9/10
Q	5/5 stars
The Rolling Stone Album Guide	2/5 stars
Rolling Stone	3/5 stars
The New York Times	(favorable)

Characters is the twenty-first studio album by American singer-songwriter Stevie Wonder, released in late 1987 on Tamla Records. The album features six singles, including the Grammy-nominated "Skeletons" (No. 19) and "You Will Know" (No. 77), which both reached number one on the Billboard R&B Singles chart (the former being the most-recent American top-40 hit of Wonder's career). The album also contained a duet with Michael Jackson, "Get It" (No. 80), that was a minor hit.

== Overview ==
Highly anticipated like his last album, 1985's In Square Circle, Characters debuted at number one on the US Billboard Top R&B Albums chart for seven weeks, while peaking at No. 17 on the US Billboard 200. With this, Characters became Wonder's first album since Music of My Mind not to reach the top 10 of the charts. In the UK, it also fared less well, reaching only No. 33, the first album to miss the top 20 since Music of My Mind, which had failed to chart in 1972.

What is more, Characters featured three singles that charted on the Billboard Hot 100 – "Get It" (No. 80) (duet with Michael Jackson), "Skeletons" (No. 19), and the ballad "You Will Know" (No. 77) – with each of these songs being hits on the Billboard R&B singles charts, along with two other singles: "My Eyes Don't Cry" (No. 6, R&B) and "With Each Beat of My Heart" (No. 28, R&B). The album's final single, "Free", hit No. 49 on the UK Pop Singles chart.

== Critical reception ==
With an A− Robert Christgau of the Village Voice wrote: "Nine lines in, he assumes the voice of God to assure sufferers that everything's gonna be all right, and instantly you lose heart. But then his chronic self-importance disappears--the worst it gets is spacy, and Stevie can make spacy a trip when he's on. Which he definitely is--melodically, rhythmically, emotionally, politically, sonically."

Lynn Van Matre of the Chicago Tribune wrote: "There are no big surprises here, just plenty of the polished, assured mix of pop, soul and funk that has kept Wonder on the charts for nearly 25 years...Wonder wrote, arranged and produced all of the songs with the exception of 'Dark `n` Lovely,' about the situation in South Africa, which features lyrics by Gary Byrd. While there is the occasional lush ballad, more of the songs are uptempo, with lots of percussive punch."

David Wild of Rolling Stone in a 3/5 stars review claimed that "even if Characters isn't quite up to the level of Wonder's best work, it is still an undeniable pleasure to have him communicating his compelling inner visions to the rest of us."

Jon Pareles of The New York Times noted: "The Characters concept is a flexible one; liner notes say it involves people's characters, written characters and the character of being positive. In practice, the lyrics are about various people – as Mr. Wonder's songs have been since he came into his own with Music of My Mind in 1972. Regardless, the concept embraces some fine songs."

Robert K. Oermann of USA Today also ranked this album at No. 28 on his list of 1987's top 50 R&B albums.

== Awards and nominations ==
Characters earned Wonder three Grammy Award nominations in 1988–89. The album's first single, "Skeletons", received two nominations for Best R&B Song and Best Male R&B Vocal Performance at the 30th Grammy Awards, losing to "Lean On Me" by Bill Withers, and Smokey Robinson's "Just to See Her" respectively. Characters received a nomination at the 31st Grammy Awards for Best Male R&B Vocal Performance, losing to Terence Trent D'Arby's debut album Introducing the Hardline According to Terence Trent D'Arby.

To promote the album, Wonder performed a one-hour Characters special on MTV, in which he also performed unreleased material as well as a duet with Stevie Ray Vaughan.

== Track listing ==
All songs written by Stevie Wonder, except "Dark 'n' Lovely" (lyrics by Gary Byrd, music by Wonder).

Side one

1. "You Will Know" – 5:00
2. "Dark 'n' Lovely" – 4:39
3. "In Your Corner" – 4:30
4. "With Each Beat of My Heart" – 5:55
5. "One of a Kind" – 5:10

Side two

1. "Skeletons" – 5:24
2. "Get It" (duet with Michael Jackson) – 4:33
3. "Galaxy Paradise" – 3:51
4. "Cryin' Through the Night" – 5:48
5. "Free" – 4:12

Bonus tracks (CD and cassette)

11. "Come Let Me Make Your Love Come Down" – 5:20
12. "My Eyes Don't Cry" – 7:05

Note: On cassette pressings, "Come Let Me Make Your Love Come Down" is moved to track six, closing side one.

== Personnel ==
- Stevie Wonder – lead vocals (all tracks), background vocals (tracks 1–2, 4, 7–8), synthesizers (2–7, 9, 11–12), moog bass (1), synth bass (9), synth horns (12), piano (9–10), keyboards (including harpsichord – 10), NED Synclavier (1, 5, 8, 11), Fairlight CMI (1, 3, 5, 8), bass (tracks 2, 7–8, 11–12), drums (1–2, 4–12), percussion (1–2, 4, 6–7), synth strings, bells (1), drum machine (3), harmonica (5)
- Michael Jackson – lead vocals (7)
- Quincy Jones – Michael Jackson's vocal producer (7)
- Stevie Ray Vaughan – guitar (11)
- B. B. King – guitar (11)
- Ben Bridges – guitar (5, electric on 7, acoustic on 10)
- James Allen – additional backing vocals (2)
- Windy Barnes – backing vocals (11)
- Judith Bennett – gospel choir vocals (10)
- Shirley Brewer – backing vocals (3, 6, 12), kazoo (12)
- Alex Brown – backing vocals (11)
- Bridgette Bryant – backing vocals (2, 5, 9–10)
- Bobby Carr – gospel choir vocals (10)
- David Daniels – gospel choir vocals (10)
- Kevin Dorsey – backing vocals (3, 6, 12), kazoo (12)
- Alexis England – backing vocals (3, 6, 12), kazoo (12)
- Marcia Escoffery – gospel choir vocals (10)
- Sandra Escoffery – gospel choir vocals (10)
- Mary Lee Evans – backing vocals (7, 9)
- Lynne Fiddmont – backing vocals (3, 5–6, 9–10, 12), kazoo (12)
- Gina Foster - gospel choir vocals (10)
- Junior Giscombe – backing vocals (5)
- Derek Green – gospel choir vocals (10)
- Renee Hardaway – backing vocals (11)
- Marva Hicks – backing vocals (5, additional on 10)
- Dorian Holley – backing vocals (3, 6, 12), kazoo (12)
- Keith John – backing vocals (2–6, 8, 10, 12), kazoo (12)
- Paul Johnson – backing vocals (9)
- Patricia Knight – gospel choir vocals (10)
- Paul Lee – gospel choir vocals (10)
- Melody McCully – backing vocals (3, 6, 12), kazoo (12)
- Myx – background vocal group (2)
- Darryl Phinnessee – backing vocals (3, 6, 12), kazoo (12)
- Iris Sutherland – gospel choir vocals (10)
- Syreeta – additional backing vocals (2)
- Carroll Thompson – gospel choir vocals (10)
- Cleveland Watkiss – gospel choir vocals (10)
- Steve Wise – additional backing vocals (8)
- Robert Arbittier – synthesizer programming (all tracks), synclavier programming (1, 5, 8, 11), computer music programming (6)
- Julian Bahula – African drums (10)
- Brad Buxer – Moog synth (10), additional synthesizer (5)
- Dennis Davis – percussion (10)
- Isaiah Sanders – synth horns (10), additional synthesizer (5)
- Nathan Watts – synth bass (10)
- Gary Olazabal – engineer, associate producer, mixing, keyboard programming, additional keyboard overdubs (all tracks)

== Charts ==
Chart (1987–1988)	Peak position
Australian Kent Music Report	23
Austrian Albums Chart	21
Canadian RPM Albums Chart	31
Dutch Albums Chart	53
Japanese Oricon Albums Chart	13
Swedish Albums Chart	16
Swiss Albums Chart	23
UK Albums Chart	33
US Billboard 200	17
West German Media Control Albums Chart	55

== Certifications ==
Region	Certification	Certified units/sales
France (SNEP)	Gold	100,000^{*}
Japan (Oricon Charts)	—	73,000
United Kingdom (BPI)	Gold	100,000^{^}
United States (RIAA)	Platinum	1,000,000^{^}
^{*} Sales figures based on certification alone.^{^} Shipments figures based on certification alone.

== See also ==
- List of Billboard number-one R&B albums of 1987
- List of Billboard number-one R&B albums of 1988
