= Whisper in the Dark =

Single by Dionne Warwick

from the album Friends
- Released: February 1986
- Recorded: 1985
- Genre: Pop; R&B; soul; soft rock
- Length: 4:35
- Label: Arista
- Songwriter(s): Bruce Roberts; Edgar Bronfman, Jr.
- Producer(s): Albhy Galuten

Dionne Warwick singles chronology
"That's What Friends Are For" (1985)	"Whisper in the Dark" (1986)	"Love Power" (1987)

"Whisper in the Dark" is a song recorded by American singer Dionne Warwick. It was written by Edgar Bronfman, Jr. and Bruce Roberts for her studio album Friends (1985). Production on the track was helmed by Albhy Galuten. A drums-heavy pop ballad with synthpop and soft rock elements, "Whisper in the Dark" was released as the album's second single in February 1986 by Arista Records. The song peaked at number 72 on the US Billboard Hot 100.

== Background ==
"Whisper in the Dark" was written by Edgar Bronfman, Jr. and Bruce Roberts and produced by Albhy Galuten for Warwick's seventh album with Arista Records, Friends (1985).

== Track listings ==
12-inch single
No.	Title	Writer(s)	Producer(s)	Length
1.	"Whisper in the Dark"	Bruce Roberts; Edgar Bronfman, Jr.	Albhy Galuten	4:30
2.	"Extravagant Gestures"	Burt Bacharach; Carole Bayer Sager	Bacharach; Bayer Sager	4:54
3.	"No-One There (To Sing Me a Love Song)"	Narada Michael Walden; Preston Glass; Randy Jackson; Walter Afanasieff	Barry Manilow	4:26

== Credits and personnel ==
Credits lifted from the liner notes of Friends .

- Edgar Bronfman, Jr. – writer
- Albhy Galuten – arranger, producer
- Bruce Roberts – writer
- Dionne Warwick – vocals

== Charts ==
Chart (1986)	Peak position
US Billboard Hot 100	72
US Adult Contemporary (Billboard)	7
US Hot R&B/Hip-Hop Songs (Billboard)	49
