= Friends (Dionne Warwick album) =

Studio album by Dionne Warwick
- Released: November 25, 1985
- Recorded: 1985
- Length: 41:57
- Label: Arista
- Producers: Burt Bacharach; Carole Bayer Sager; David Foster; Albhy Galuten; Barry Manilow; Narada Michael Walden; Stevie Wonder

Dionne Warwick chronology
| Finder of Lost Loves (1985) | Friends (1985) | Reservations for Two (1987) |

Singles from Friends
- 1. "That's What Friends Are For" Released: November 1985; 2. "Whisper in the Dark" Released: February 1986

Professional ratings
Review scores
| Source | Rating |
|---|---|
| Allmusic | 2/5 stars |
| Rolling Stone Album Guide | 3/5 stars |

Friends is a studio album by American singer Dionne Warwick. It was released by Arista Records on November 25, 1985 in the United States. It was her seventh album with the label. The executive producer was Clive Davis, who consulted frequent collaborators Burt Bacharach, Carole Bayer Sager, Albhy Galuten, Barry Manilow, and Stevie Wonder as well as Narada Michael Walden and David Foster to work with Warwick.

Following a series of commercial successes, Friends marked a return to form for Warwick. Her highest-charting album since Dionne (1979), it peaked at number 12 on the US Billboard 200 and went gold in Canada and the US. At the 1987 Grammy Awards, the album was nominated for Best Pop Vocal Performance, Female. Friends yielded the worldwide top ten single "That's What Friends Are For", which became Warwick's biggest US hit, spending four weeks at number one on the Billboard Hot 100. A second single, "Whisper in the Dark", was released in 1986.

== Track listing ==
Side one
| No. | Title | Writer(s) | Producer(s) | Length |
|---|---|---|---|---|
| 1. | "That's What Friends Are For" (featuring Elton John, Gladys Knight and Stevie Wonder) | Carole Bayer Sager; Burt Bacharach | Sager; Bacharach | 4:15 |
| 2. | "Whisper in the Dark" | Bruce Roberts; Edgar Bronfman, Jr. | Albhy Galuten | 4:35 |
| 3. | "Remember Your Heart" | Dan Navarro; David P. Bryant | Galuten | 3:43 |
| 4. | "Love at Second Sight" | David Foster; Paul Gordon | Foster | 4:40 |
| 5. | "Moments Aren't Moments" | Stevie Wonder | Wonder | 4:36 |

Side two
| No. | Title | Writer(s) | Producer(s) | Length |
|---|---|---|---|---|
| 6. | "Stronger Than Before" | Sager; Bacharach; Roberts | Sager; Bacharach | 3:22 |
| 7. | "Stay Devoted" | Sager; Bacharach | Sager; Bacharach | 3:36 |
| 8. | "No One There (To Sing Me a Love Song)" | Narada Michael Walden; Preston Glass; Randy Jackson; Walter Afanasieff | Barry Manilow; Artie Butler; Walden | 4:28 |
| 9. | "How Long?" | Sager; Bacharach | Sager; Bacharach | 4:12 |
| 10. | "Extravagant Gestures" | Sager; Bacharach | Sager; Bacharach | 4:59 |

== Charts ==
=== Weekly charts ===
Weekly chart performance for Friends
| Chart (1985–1986) | Peak position |
|---|---|
| Australian Albums (Kent Music Report) | 29 |
| Canada Top 100 Albums (RPM) | 16 |
| Norwegian Albums (VG-lista) | 20 |
| Swedish Albums (Sverigetopplistan) | 33 |
| US Top Pop Albums (Billboard) | 12 |
| US Top Black Albums (Billboard) | 9 |
| US Top 100 Albums (Cash Box) | 14 |
| US Top 75 Black Contemporary Albums (Cash Box) | 4 |

=== Year-end charts ===
Year-end chart performance for Friends
| Chart (1986) | Position |
|---|---|
| Canada Top 100 Albums (RPM) | 82 |
| US Top Pop Albums (Billboard) | 89 |
| US Top Black Albums (Billboard) | 38 |
| US Top 75 Black Contemporary Albums (Cash Box) | 30 |

== Certifications and sales ==
Certifications for Friends
| Region | Certification | Certified units/sales |
|---|---|---|
| Canada (Music Canada) | Gold | 50,000^{^} |
| United States (RIAA) | Gold | 500,000^{^} |
^{^} Shipments figures based on certification alone.
