= Stranger on the Shore of Love =

Single by Stevie Wonder from his 1995 album

Single by Stevie Wonder

from the album In Square Circle
- B-side: "Instrumental"
- Genre: R&B; soul
- Label: Tamla
- Songwriter: Stevie Wonder
- Producer: Stevie Wonder

Stevie Wonder singles chronology
"Land of La La" (1986)	"Stranger on the Shore of Love" (1987)	"Skeletons" (1987)

"Stranger on the Shore of Love" is a hit single written and performed by American R&B singer-songwriter Stevie Wonder on the Tamla (Motown) label from his 1985 album In Square Circle.

== Personnel ==
- Stevie Wonder – lead vocal, background vocal, synthesizers, drums, harpsichord, accordion

== Charts ==
Chart (1987)	Peak position
UK Singles (Official Charts)	55
