= In Square Circle =

1985 studio album by Stevie Wonder

Studio album by Stevie Wonder
- Released: September 13, 1985
- Recorded: 1984–1985
- Studio: Wonderland (Los Angeles, California)
- Genre: R&B; soul
- Length: 46:00 (LP); 49:22 (CD)
- Label: Tamla
- Producer: Stevie Wonder

Stevie Wonder chronology
The Woman in Red (1984)	In Square Circle (1985)	Characters (1987)

Singles from In Square Circle
- 1. "Part-Time Lover" Released: August 24, 1985; 2. "Go Home" Released: October 1985; 3. "Overjoyed" Released: Late 1985; 4. "Land of La La" Released: April 1986; 5. "Stranger on the Shore of Love" Released: July 1986

Professional ratings
Review scores
Source	Rating
AllMusic	3/5 stars
Robert Christgau	B+
Rolling Stone	(favorable)
The Rolling Stone Album Guide	3/5 stars

In Square Circle is the twentieth studio album by American singer-songwriter Stevie Wonder, released in September 1985 on Tamla Records. In Square Circle spent 12 weeks at number one on the US Billboard Top R&B Albums chart. The album also made the top five on the US Billboard 200 and peaked at No. 5 on the UK Pop Albums chart.

== Singles ==
In Square Circle features hit singles "Part-Time Lover" (No. 1), "Go Home" (No. 10), "Overjoyed" (No. 24), and "Land of La La" (No. 86).

== Critical reception ==
Jon Pareles of Rolling Stone claimed "Wonder seems immune to the current epidemic of posturing self-importance, and with his unforced optimism and his no-sweat audio perfectionism, he makes your ears happy, again and again. On In Square Circle, he's as irresistible as ever."

With a B+ Robert Christgau of the Village Voice found "Compare this to the others in your head and you'll be hard-pressed to specify what's missing, but slap on Talking Book or Hotter Than July and you'll hear how cushy it is—polyrhythmic pop rather than polyrhythmic rock. Stevie's effervescence is so indomitable that it's a pleasure even so, but nothing rises far enough out of the stew".

Ron Wynn of AllMusic, gave a 3 out of 5 stars rating saying, "Although it went platinum, nothing stands as better evidence of how cyclical the pop experience is than the response to In Square Circle. Wonder actually wrote some superb songs, and several, like 'Overjoyed' and 'I Love You Too Much', were superior to the hit single 'Part-Time Lover'. But that one zoomed to the top spot and became the album's definitive tune in the minds of many."

RJ Smith of Spin called the album, "a pleasant muttering packaged as a Major Statement. Where's the energy and comedy of the man who turns into a mercurial mimic on stage? The lights are on, but nobody's home."

Stephen Holden of the New York Times declared "Chock full of surging chromatic melodies, powerful dance rhythms and churning synthesized instrumentation, In Square Circle is classic Stevie Wonder in the way it combines extremes of primitivism and lofty spiritual and artistic aspiration. Like all of Mr. Wonder's best records, In Square Circle is an allegorical pop mural whose panels each suggest a different symbolic tableau. Musically, the album is more concise and less experimental than the sprawling two-disk sets, Songs in the Key of Life and the Journey Through the Secret Life of Plants. His latest songs are also more consistently melodic and danceable than those on his 1980 album, Hotter Than July."

Wonder also won a Grammy for the album, in the category of Best Male R&B Vocal Performance.

== Track listing ==
All tracks are written by Stevie Wonder

Side one
No.	Title	Length
1.	"Part-Time Lover"	4:09
2.	"I Love You Too Much"	5:30
3.	"Whereabouts"	4:17
4.	"Stranger on the Shore of Love"	5:01
5.	"Never in Your Sun"	4:07

Side two
No.	Title	Length
1.	"Spiritual Walkers"	5:12
2.	"Land of La La"	5:14
3.	"Go Home"	5:18
4.	"Overjoyed"	3:43
5.	"It's Wrong (Apartheid)"	3:29 (Note: 6:52 on CD and Streaming editions)

== Personnel ==
Musicians

"Part-Time Lover"

- Stevie Wonder – lead vocal, synthesizers, drums
- Luther Vandross – lead vocal, background vocal
- Syreeta Wright – background vocal
- Philip Bailey – background vocal
- Keith John – background vocal
- Melody McCully, Billy Durham, Peter Byrne, Renee Hardaway, Darryl Phinnessee – background vocal

"I Love You Too Much"

- Stevie Wonder – lead vocal, background vocal, synthesizers, drums, percussion

"Whereabouts"

- Stevie Wonder – lead vocal, synthesizers, drums, percussion
- Keith John – background vocal
- Darryl Phinnessee – background vocal
- Deniece Williams – background vocal
- Howard Smith – background vocal

"Stranger on the Shore of Love"

- Stevie Wonder – lead vocal, background vocal, synthesizers, drums, harpsichord, accordion

"Never in Your Sun"

- Stevie Wonder – lead vocal, background vocal, synthesizers, drums, percussion, harmonica

"Spiritual Walkers"

- Stevie Wonder – lead vocal, Yamaha CS-80 synthesizer, drums, percussion
- Edwin Birdsong – Yamaha CS-80 synthesizer
- Larry Gittens – trumpet
- Bob Malach – saxophone
- Janice Moore, Cheta Akins, Carolyn Garrett, Ruthell Holmes, Kay Gibbs, Valencia Cox – background vocal

"Land of La La"

- Stevie Wonder – lead vocal, background vocal, synthesizers, electric piano, percussion, drums
- Ben Bridges – guitar
- Rick Zunigar – guitar
- Renee Hardaway – background vocal

"Go Home"

- Stevie Wonder – lead vocal, background vocal, synthesizers, drums, vocoder
- Bob Malach – saxophone
- Larry Gittens – trumpet

"Overjoyed"

- Stevie Wonder – lead vocal, background vocal, acoustic piano, environmental percussion (incl.: crickets, bird sounds, ocean, pebbles in pond, stone dropped, crushing leaves), Yamaha CS-80 synthesizer
- Earl Klugh – guitar
- Paul Riser – string arrangement

"It's Wrong (Apartheid)"

- Stevie Wonder – lead vocal, synthesizers, drums, percussion, kora
- Musa Dludla, Thandeka Ngono-Raasch, Linda Bottoman-Tshabalala, Muntu Myuyana, Lorraine Mahlangu-Richards, Fana Kekana, Tsepo Mokone – background vocal

Technical personnel

- Stevie Wonder – producer, performer, writer, composer
- Bob Bralove, Brad Buxer, Abdoulaye Soumare – synthesizer programming
- Gary Olazabal – synthesizer programming, recording engineer, associate producer, audio mixing
- Bobby Holland – photography (album cover/booklet), concept designer (album cover)
- Renee Hardaway – concept designer (album cover)
- Johnny Lee – art direction (album cover)

== Notable performances ==
"Go Home" was performed during the 1986 Grammy Awards ceremony as part of a synthesizer jam with Thomas Dolby, Herbie Hancock, and Howard Jones. It was also performed, along with "Overjoyed," on the May 7, 1983, episode of Saturday Night Live, which Wonder hosted.

== Charts ==
=== Weekly charts ===
Weekly chart performance for In Square Circle
Chart (1985–1986)	Position
Australian Kent Music Report	8
Austrian Albums Chart	12
Canadian RPM Albums Chart	7
Dutch Albums Chart	16
Japanese Oricon Albums Chart	3
New Zealand Albums Chart	7
Norwegian VG-lista Albums Chart	3
Swedish Albums Chart	2
Swiss Albums Chart	4
UK Albums (OCC)	5
US Billboard 200	5
West German Media Control Albums Chart	8

=== Year-end charts ===
1985 year-end chart performance for In Square Circle
Chart (1985)	Position
Canadian Albums Chart	29
French Albums Chart	21

1986 year-end chart performance for In Square Circle
Chart (1986)	Position
Canadian Albums Chart	91
Japanese Albums Chart	19
US Billboard 200	18

== Certifications ==
Certifications for In Square Circle
Region	Certification	Certified units/sales
Canada (Music Canada)	2× Platinum	200,000^{^}
France (SNEP)	Gold	100,000^{*}
Hong Kong (IFPI Hong Kong)	Gold	10,000^{*}
Japan (Oricon Charts)	—	596,000
New Zealand (RMNZ)	Gold	7,500^{^}
Spain (Promusicae)	Platinum	100,000^{^}
United Kingdom (BPI)	Gold	100,000^{^}
United States (RIAA)	2× Platinum	2,000,000^{^}
^{*} Sales figures based on certification alone.^{^} Shipments figures based on certification alone.

== See also ==
- List of Billboard number-one R&B albums of 1985
- List of Billboard number-one R&B albums of 1986
