= That's What Friends Are For =

1982 song by Rod Stewart

Song by Rod Stewart

from the album Night Shift
- Released: 1982
- Genre: Pop
- Length: 3:54
- Label: Warner Bros.
- Songwriters: Burt Bacharach; Carole Bayer Sager

"That's What Friends Are For" is a song written by Burt Bacharach and Carole Bayer Sager.

It was first recorded by Rod Stewart in 1982 for the soundtrack of the film Night Shift, but it is best known for the 1985 version by Dionne Warwick, Elton John, Gladys Knight, and Stevie Wonder. This recording, billed as being by Dionne Warwick & Friends, was released as a charity single for AIDS research and prevention. It was a massive hit, becoming the number-one single of 1986 in the United States, and winning the Grammy Awards for Best Pop Performance by a Duo or Group with Vocals and Song of the Year. It raised more than $3 million for its cause.

== Dionne Warwick version ==
"That's What Friends Are For"

Single by Dionne Warwick, Elton John, Gladys Knight and Stevie Wonder (as "Dionne & Friends")

from the album Friends
- B-side: "Two Ships Passing in the Night"
- Released: October 1985
- Genre: Pop; soul; R&B
- Length: 4:15
- Label: Arista
- Songwriters: Burt Bacharach; Carole Bayer Sager
- Producers: Burt Bacharach; Carole Bayer Sager

Dionne Warwick singles chronology
"Run to Me" (1985)	"That's What Friends Are For" (1985)	"Whisper in the Dark" (1986)

Elton John singles chronology
"Act of War" (1985)	"That's What Friends Are For" (1985)	"Nikita" (1985)

Gladys Knight singles chronology
"Till I See You Again" (1985)	"That's What Friends Are For" (1985)	"Send It to Me" (1986)

Stevie Wonder singles chronology
"Part-Time Lover" (1985)	"That's What Friends Are For" (1985)	"Go Home" (1985)

Music video
- "That's What Friends Are For" on YouTube

=== Background and composition ===
Dionne Warwick's recording of "That's What Friends Are For" marked the first time she had worked with Bacharach since the 1970s, when Warwick felt abandoned by Bacharach and Hal David dissolving their partnership. Warwick said of their reconciliation:

We realized we were more than just friends. We were family. Time has a way of giving people the opportunity to grow and understand ... Working with Burt is not a bit different from how it used to be. He expects me to deliver and I can. He knows what I'm going to do before I do it, and the same with me. That's how intertwined we've been.

A one-off collaboration headed by Warwick and featuring Gladys Knight, Elton John, and Stevie Wonder, with a different second verse, was released as a charity single in the UK and the US in 1985. The song is in the key of E♭ major. It was recorded as a benefit for the American Foundation for AIDS Research, and raised more than US$3 million for that cause. Warwick, who had previously raised money for blood-related diseases such as sickle-cell anemia, wanted to help combat the then-growing AIDS epidemic because she had seen friends die painfully of the disease. John plays piano and Wonder plays harmonica on the song; the two had previously worked together on 1983's "I Guess That's Why They Call It the Blues".

=== Critical reception ===
The Dionne and Friends version of the song won the performers the Grammy Award for Best Pop Performance by a Duo or Group with Vocals, as well as Song of the Year for its writers, Bacharach and Bayer Sager.

=== Chart performance ===
In the US, the song held the number-one spot of the adult contemporary chart for two weeks, the number-one spot of the soul chart for three weeks, and the top spot of the Billboard Hot 100 for four weeks. It became Billboard's number-one single of 1986. It was certified Gold on January 15, 1986, by the Recording Industry Association of America (RIAA). It was the final US number one for all but John, who would have two more US number-ones during the 1990s. In 2018, to mark the 60th anniversary of the Hot 100 chart, Billboard ranked the song as the chart's 78th-most successful single.

Outside the United States, the song topped the charts in Canada and Australia and reached the top 10 in Ireland, New Zealand, Norway, South Africa, and Sweden. On the UK Singles Chart, the song debuted at number 49 and climbed to its peak of number 16 three weeks later, staying at that position for another week before descending the chart. It remained in the UK top 100 for a further five weeks, totaling 10 weeks on the chart altogether.

=== Live performances ===
Warwick, John, Knight, and Wonder performed the song live together for the first time in 23 years at the 25th Anniversary amfAR gala in New York City on February 10, 2011.

=== Personnel ===
Personnel are adapted from Sessiondays.

- Dionne Warwick – vocals
- Elton John – vocals, piano
- Gladys Knight – vocals
- Stevie Wonder – vocals, harmonica
- Freddie Washington – bass
- John Robinson – drums
- Michael Landau – guitar
- Randy Kerber – keyboards
- David Foster – synthesizer
- Paulinho da Costa – percussion

=== Charts ===
==== Weekly charts ====
Weekly chart performance for "That's What Friends Are For"
Chart (1985–1986)	Peak position
Australia (Kent Music Report)	1
Belgium (Ultratop 50 Flanders)	10
Canada Retail Singles (The Record)	1
Canada Top Singles (RPM)	1
Canada Adult Contemporary (RPM)	1
Europe (European Hot 100 Singles)	19
Finland (Suomen virallinen lista)	18
France (IFOP)	79
Ireland (IRMA)	7
Italy (Musica e dischi)	5
Luxembourg (Radio Luxembourg)	9
Netherlands (Dutch Top 40)	11
Netherlands (Single Top 100)	13
New Zealand (Recorded Music NZ)	3
Norway (VG-lista)	6
South Africa (Springbok Radio)	2
Sweden (Sverigetopplistan)	7
Switzerland (Schweizer Hitparade)	11
UK Singles (Official Charts)	16
US Billboard Hot 100	1
US Adult Contemporary (Billboard)	1
US Hot R&B/Hip-Hop Songs (Billboard)	1
West Germany (GfK)	36

==== Year-end charts ====
Year-end chart performance for "That's What Friends Are For"
Chart (1986)	Position
Australia (Kent Music Report)	12
Brazil (Crowley)	10
Canada Top Singles (RPM)	10
New Zealand (RIANZ)	28
South Africa (Springbok Radio)	17
US Billboard Hot 100	1
US Adult Contemporary (Billboard)	1
US Hot Black Singles (Billboard)	4

=== Certifications ===
Certifications for "That's What Friends Are For"
Region	Certification	Certified units/sales
Canada (Music Canada)	Platinum	100,000^{^}
Denmark (IFPI Danmark)	Gold	45,000^{‡}
New Zealand (RMNZ)	Gold	15,000^{‡}
United Kingdom (BPI)	Silver	200,000^{‡}
United States (RIAA)	Gold	1,000,000^{^}
^{^} Shipments figures based on certification alone.^{‡} Sales+streaming figures based on certification alone.

== 1990 benefit concert ==
On March 17, 1990, an AIDS benefit titled That's What Friends Are For: Arista Records 15th Anniversary Concert was held at Radio City Music Hall in New York City. One month later, CBS aired a two-hour version of the concert on television. The celebrity guests and performers were: Luther Vandross, Air Supply, Lauren Bacall, Burt Bacharach, Eric Carmen, Chevy Chase, Jane Curtin, Clive Davis, Taylor Dayne, Michael Douglas, Exposé, Whoopi Goldberg, Melanie Griffith, Hall & Oates, Jennifer Holliday, Whitney Houston, Alan Jackson, Kenny G, Melissa Manchester, Barry Manilow, Milli Vanilli, Jeffrey Osborne, Carly Simon, Patti Smith, Lisa Stansfield, The Four Tops, and Dionne Warwick. "That's What Friends Are For" was the finale song sung by Warwick and cousin Houston before being joined on the stage by the other guests of the event. More than $2.5 million was raised that night for the Arista Foundation which gave the proceeds to various AIDS organizations.

== Other versions ==
In September 2023, British actor-singers Denise van Outen and Duncan James released a duet version in aid of Macmillan Cancer Support, which was recorded in tribute to their friend, singer Sarah Harding, who died from breast cancer in 2021.

In 2024, Warwick took part in a parody version of the song for a Capital One commercial celebrating the annual NCAA Division I men's basketball tournament.

Long time WPFW radio host Donnie McKethan used an instrumental version of "That's What Friends Are For" by Vincent Montana, Jr. from the album Sut/l Vibes as the theme song / outro music for his radio programs.
