= Get It (Stevie Wonder song) =

Single by Stevie Wonder featuring Michael Jackson

from the album Characters
- B-side: "Get It" (instrumental)
- Released: May 5, 1988
- Recorded: September 1987
- Studio: CBS/Sony Studio, Tokyo (Jackson's vocals); Wonderland, Los Angeles, California
- Genre: R&B
- Length: 4:32 (album version); 4:22 (single version); 6:44 (extended version)
- Label: Tamla
- Songwriter: Stevie Wonder
- Producers: Stevie Wonder; Gary Olazabal; Quincy Jones (Jackson's vocals)

Stevie Wonder singles chronology
"You Will Know" (1987)	"Get It" (1988)	"My Love (with Julio Iglesias)" (1988)

Michael Jackson singles chronology
"Dirty Diana" (1988)	"Get It" (1988)	"Another Part of Me" (1988)

"Get It" is a song recorded by American singer-songwriter Stevie Wonder with a guest vocal by American pop recording artist Michael Jackson. It was released by Tamla as the third single from Wonder's twenty-first studio album, Characters (1987). At the time of the single's release, and their albums released in the same year, Wonder worked with Jackson on his top-selling Bad album for their first duet "Just Good Friends". "Get It" was a R&B chart hit, peaking at number four. On the US Billboard Hot 100 it peaked at number 80. Overseas, the single became a moderate hit. In the UK, the single reached number 37 on the official UK Singles Chart.

== Background ==
Jackson and Wonder had a history of collaborating with each other over the years. The first dating back to 1974, in which Wonder crafted and produced a Jackson 5 album, which was eventually shelved. (One of those songs recorded, "Buttercup" appears on the 2009 compilation album I Want You Back! Unreleased Masters, released after Jackson's death.)

That same year, Michael and his brothers provided backing vocals to Wonder's hit "You Haven't Done Nothin'" from his parent album Fullfillingness' First Finale. Both Wonder and Jackson were part of an all-star choir included on Donna Summer's 1982 single "State of Independence" and 1985's "We Are the World", which Jackson co-wrote and both singles produced by Quincy Jones.

Jackson worked with Wonder again for the song "I Can't Help It" for Jackson's 1979 breakthrough album Off the Wall, which was written by Wonder and former Supremes member Susaye Greene. Within a year, Jackson also did background vocal work on "All I Do" from Wonder's platinum-selling Hotter than July album.

== Critical reception ==
Cash Box called it a "light dance tune, heavy on groove, low on fat" that is "exciting and accessible" and praised Wonder's "patented skipping base feel and percussive sound" and Jackson's singing. John Tague from NME viewed it as "a half-decent ditty that's more Jacko than Wonder."

Melody Maker called it "mutton-head funk for people with a few buttons short when it comes to the lobes. The bloody vultures are hovering. I sincerely hope they put an end to all this spinsterish stuff."

== Personnel ==
- Stevie Wonder – lead vocals, backing vocals, synthesizers, bass guitar, drums, and synthesized percussion
- Michael Jackson – lead vocals
- Mary Lee Evans – backing vocals
- Ben Bridges – guitar
- Robert Arbittier – synthesizer programming
- Gary Olazabal - additional keyboard overdubs

== Charts ==
=== Weekly charts ===
Chart (1988)	Peak position
Belgium (Ultratop 50 Flanders)	15
Europe (European Hot 100 Singles)	88
Finland (Suomen virallinen singlelista)	22
Italy Airplay (Music & Media)	2
UK Singles (OCC)	37
US Billboard Hot 100	80
US Hot R&B/Hip-Hop Songs (Billboard)	4
