= Nice 'n' Slow =

1988 single recorded by Freddie Jackson

Single by Freddie Jackson

from the album Don't Let Love Slip Away
- B-side: "You Are My Love"
- Released: 1988
- Genre: R&B; soul
- Length: 5:16
- Label: Capitol
- Songwriters: Barry J. Eastmond; Jolyon Skinner
- Producer: Barry J. Eastmond

Freddie Jackson singles chronology
"Jam Tonight" (1987)	"Nice 'n' Slow" (1988)	"Hey Lover" (1988)

"Nice 'n' Slow" is a 1988 ballad song by American R&B singer Freddie Jackson and written by Barry J. Eastmond and Jolyon Skinner. It was released as the lead single from his third album, Don't Let Love Slip Away.

The hit song was Jackson's seventh number one on the Billboard Hot Black Singles chart, staying at the top spot for three weeks. "Nice 'n' Slow" was the last of Jackson's releases to chart on the Hot 100, peaking at number sixty-one.

== Track listings and formats ==
- US 7" vinyl single

A. "Nice 'n' Slow" – 4:15
B. "You Are My Love" – 4:16

- US 12" vinyl single

A1. "Nice 'n' Slow" (Radio Remix) – 5:11
A2. "Nice 'n' Slow" (Radio Edit) – 4:15
B1. "Nice 'n' Slow" (Extended Version) – 5:56
B2. "You Are My Love" – 5:23

- UK CD Maxi-single
1. "Nice 'n' Slow" – 5:12
2. "Nice 'n' Slow" (Extended Version) – 6:00
3. "You Are My Love" – 4:58
- Brazil 12" vinyl single

A1. "Nice 'n' Slow" (Radio Edit) – 4:15
A2. "Nice 'n' Slow" (Radio Remix) – 5:11
B1. "Nice 'n' Slow" (Radio Remix) – 5:11

- Remix and production by Steve Goldman and Zack Vaz

== Credits and personnel ==
- Executive-Producer – Beau Huggins
- Producer, Arrangement – Barry J. Eastmond
- Guitars – Mike Campbell
- Lead Vocals – Freddie Jackson
- Keyboards, Drum programming – Eric Rehl
- Bass – Anthony Jackson
- Keyboards, Drum programming – Barry Eastmond
- Writer – Barry Eastmond, Jolson Skinner
- Backing Vocals – Freddie Jackson, Cindy Mizelle, Curtis Lee, Yolanda Lee
- Alto Saxophone – Najee
- Mixed, Engineer – Steve Goldman
- Engineer – Michael Allaire

== Charts ==
=== Weekly charts ===
Chart (1988)	Peak position
UK Singles Chart	56
US Billboard Hot 100	61
US Hot R&B/Hip-Hop Songs (Billboard)	1

== See also ==
- List of number-one R&B singles of 1988 (U.S.)
