= Skeletons (Stevie Wonder song) =

Single by Stevie Wonder

from the album Characters
- B-side: "Instrumental"
- Released: September 29, 1987
- Recorded: 1987
- Studio: Wonderland Recording Studios, Los Angeles
- Genre: R&B, funk
- Length: 4:55 (single edit); 5:24 (album version); 6:43 (12-inch extended version)
- Label: Motown
- Songwriter: Stevie Wonder
- Producers: Stevie Wonder; Gary Olazabal

Stevie Wonder singles chronology
"Stranger on the Shore of Love" (1987)	"Skeletons" (1987)	"You Will Know" (1987)

"Skeletons" is a number-one R&B single performed by American recording artist Stevie Wonder from his 1987 Characters album.

== Song background ==
The song is an R&B record about lies and deceptions being uncovered. The 12-inch extended version features short sound bites from prominent figures such as Col. Oliver North ("I am not ashamed of anything in my professional and personal conduct") and President Ronald Reagan ("The United States has not made concessions to those who hold our people captive in Lebanon") among others. This has remained a popular R&B uptempo song for Stevie Wonder, as well receiving airplay from urban radio stations.

The song is briefly used in the 1988 action film Die Hard.

== Critical reception ==
Jon Pareles of the New York Times proclaimed, "The tune's synthesizer groove recalls Mr. Wonder's Superstition, while the chorus echoes P-Funk - and the combination makes moral indignation danceable." Ed Hogan of Allmusic described the tune as " a Wonder one-man band tour de force. " Lynn Van Matre of the Chicago Tribune also called Skeletons a "funky, danceable" tune.

== Music video ==
The song's music video shows Stevie Wonder sitting on the front porch of his home, in a typical white-picket-fence American neighborhood. As the video progresses, he greets his archetypical neighbors, and we are shown who they are; then we are shown their "skeletons", or secrets. Karen Black is featured as the "perfect" mother and housewife who is secretly an alcoholic. Next is the businessman, a "pillar of the community" who cross-dresses in private. Then, the "all-American girl next door" is shown to be secretly being molested by her father. Lastly, we are shown the athletic "all-American boy next door" who is actually a cocaine addict.

== Accolades ==
The song earned Stevie Wonder two 1988 Grammy Award nominations for Best R&B Song and Best Male R&B Vocal Performance.

== Personnel ==
- Stevie Wonder – lead vocals, synthesizers, drums, percussion
- Ben Bridges - electric guitar
- Robert Arbittier – synthesizer programming
- Paul Wiffen - additional synth programming and sampling
- Gary Olazabal - additional keyboard overdubs
- Dorian Holley, Alexis England, Kevin Dorsey, Darryl Phinnessee, Melody McCully, Keith John, Lynne Fiddmont-Lindsey, Shirley Brewer – backing vocals

== Chart performance ==
"Skeletons" went to number one on the Black Singles Chart, and peaked on the Billboard Hot 100 at number 19, and was the final top 40 hit for Wonder to date. The single also peaked at number 20 on the US dance chart.

== Charts ==
=== Weekly charts ===
Chart (1987)	Peak position
Italy Airplay (Music & Media)	6
US Billboard Hot 100	19
US Hot R&B/Hip-Hop Songs (Billboard)	1
US Dance Club Songs (Billboard)	20
