= Don't Let Love Slip Away =

Studio album by Freddie Jackson
- Released: July 29, 1988
- Recorded: February–July 1988
- Studios: East Bay Studios (Tarrytown, New York); Minot Sound (White Plains, New York); Electric Lady Studios, Soundtrack Studios, Sound Ideas Studios, Unique Recording Studios and Skyline Studios (New York City, New York); The Music Palace (West Hempstead, New York)
- Genres: Funk; Soul
- Length: 46:45
- Label: Capitol
- Producers: Amir Bayyan; Barry Eastmond; Paul Laurence; Gene McFadden

Freddie Jackson chronology
Just Like the First Time (1986)	Don't Let Love Slip Away (1988)	Do Me Again (1990)

Professional ratings
Review scores
Source	Rating
AllMusic	3/5 stars

Don't Let Love Slip Away is the third studio album by American singer Freddie Jackson. It was released by Capitol Records on July 29, 1988. The album reached number one on the US Top R&B/Hip-Hop Albums and peaked at number 48 on the Billboard 200. It was eventually certified gold by the RIAA in April 1989. Its singles, "Nice 'N' Slow" and "Hey Lover", reached number one on the R&B chart.

== Track listing ==
No.	Title	Writer(s)	Producer(s)	Length
1.	"Nice 'N' Slow"	Barry J. Eastmond; Jolyon Skinner	Eastmond	5:16
2.	"Hey Lover"	Keith Washington; Arthur "Sonny" Moore	Paul Laurence; Darryl Shepard (co.)	5:12
3.	"Don't Let Love Slip Away"	Eastmond; Skinner	Eastmond	4:52
4.	"Crazy (For Me)"	Eastmond; Skinner	Eastmond	4:04
5.	"One Heart Too Many"	Eastmond; Skinner	Eastmond	4:29
6.	"If You Don't Know Me by Now"	Douglas Booth; Gene McFadden; Linda Vitali	McFadden; Vitali (co.)	4:32
7.	"You and I Got a Thang"	Jeanette Day; Amir Bayyan; Gregg Willis	Bayyan	4:45
8.	"Special Lady"	Freddie Jackson; Laurence; Moore	Laurence	4:49
9.	"Yes, I Need You"	Booth; McFadden; Vitali	McFadden; Vitali (co.)	4:26
10.	"It's Gonna Take a Long, Long Time"	Booth; McFadden; Vitali	McFadden; Vitali (co.)	4:23

== Personnel and credits ==
Musicians

- Freddie Jackson – lead vocals, backing vocals (1, 3–5)
- Barry J. Eastmond – keyboards (1, 3–5), programming (1), drum programming (1, 3, 4), synthesizers (5)
- Eric Rehl – keyboards (1), programming (1), synthesizers (5)
- Paul Laurence – instruments (2, 8), backing vocals (8)
- Darryl Shepherd – programming (2, 8)
- Douglas Booth – keyboards (6, 9, 10), drum programming (6, 9, 10), backing vocals (6, 9, 10)
- Amir Bayyan – keyboards (7), guitars (7), drum programming (7)
- Mike Campbell – guitars (1, 3, 4)
- Ira Siegel – guitars (5)
- Skip McDonald – guitars (6, 9, 10)
- Wayne Brathwaite – bass (3)
- Doug Wimbish – bass (6, 9, 10)
- Terry Silverlight – drums (5)
- Bashiri Johnson – percussion (3, 5)
- Joe Deihl – bells (10)
- Najee – alto saxophone (1), soprano saxophone (3)
- Steve Greenfield – alto saxophone (7)
- Curtis King – backing vocals (1, 3–5)
- Yolanda Lee – backing vocals (1–5, 8)
- Cindy Mizelle – backing vocals (1–5, 8)
- Audrey Wheeler – backing vocals (2, 3, 8)
- Gene McFadden – backing vocals (6, 9, 10)
- Cindy Robinson – backing vocals (6, 9, 10)
- Kevin Owens – backing vocals (7)

Production

- Wayne Edwards – executive producer
- Beau Huggins – executive producer
- Freddie Jackson – executive producer
- Barry J. Eastmond – producer (1, 3–5), rhythm arrangements (1, 3–5), string arrangements (1, 3, 5)
- Paul Laurence – producer (2, 8), arrangements (2, 8)
- Darryl Shepherd – associate producer (2, 8)
- Gene McFadden – producer (6, 9, 10), arrangements (6, 9, 10)
- Linda Vitali – associate producer (6, 9, 10)
- Amir Bayyan – producer (7)
- Zack Vaz – production coordinator
- Anne Thomas – administrator
- Tommy Steele – art direction
- DNZ, The Design Group – design
- Bret Lopez – photography
- Alfonso Grundy – make-up
- Mary Alice Orito – stylist
- Hush Productions, Inc. – management

Technical credits

- Jack Skinner – mastering at Sterling Sound (New York, NY)
- Mike Allaire – recording (1, 3–5)
- Steve Goldman – mixing (1, 3–5)
- Ron Banks – recording (2, 8), mixing (2, 8)
- Kurt Upper – recording (6, 7, 9, 10)
- Mallory Earl – mixing (6, 9, 10)
- Mike Bova – recording (7)
- Peter Dlugokenchy – recording (7)
- Paul Logus – assistant engineer (2, 6, 8–10)
- Charles Alexander – assistant engineer (8)

== Charts ==
=== Weekly charts ===
Chart (1988)	Peak position
UK Albums (Official Charts)	24
US Billboard 200	48
US Top R&B/Hip-Hop Albums (Billboard)	1

=== Year-end charts ===
Chart (1988)	Position
US Top R&B/Hip-Hop Albums (Billboard)	38
Chart (1989)	Position
US Top R&B/Hip-Hop Albums (Billboard)	21

== Certifications ==
Region	Certification	Certified units/sales
United States (RIAA)	Gold	500,000^{^}
^{^} Shipments figures based on certification alone.
