= Part-Time Lover =

1985 single by Stevie Wonder

Single by Stevie Wonder

from the album In Square Circle
- B-side: "Instrumental"
- Released: August 24, 1985
- Genre: Synth-pop; R&B; soul
- Length: 4:12 (album version); 3:43 (7" version); 8:20 (12" version)
- Label: Tamla
- Songwriter: Stevie Wonder
- Producer: Stevie Wonder

Stevie Wonder singles chronology
"We Are The World" (1985)	"Part-Time Lover" (1985)	"That's What Friends Are For" (1985)

"Part-Time Lover" is a song by American R&B singer and songwriter Stevie Wonder, released as the first single from his twentieth studio album, In Square Circle (1985). The song reached number one on the US Billboard Hot 100, R&B, dance, and adult contemporary charts, becoming Wonder's final number one hit to date. The song's simultaneous chart successes made Wonder the first artist to score a number-one hit on four different Billboard charts. The song was also released as a special 12" version. Lyrically, it tells the story of a man who is cheating on his wife with a mistress, only to find out in the end that his wife is cheating on him as well.

"Part-Time Lover" also reached number three on the UK Singles Chart, thanks in large part to a performance by Wonder on Top of the Pops in late 1985.

The song featured R&B singer Luther Vandross singing the ad-libs and backing vocals, in addition to Syreeta Wright and Philip Bailey of Earth, Wind and Fire. Wonder earned a Grammy Award nomination for Best Male Pop Vocal Performance in 1986, for the song. Wonder is noted in the liner notes of the four-CD set Hitsville USA: The Motown Singles Collection Volume 2 1972-1992 as describing the music for the song as an ode to "You Can't Hurry Love" and "My World Is Empty Without You", both by the Supremes, former Motown labelmates of Wonder.

== Charts ==
=== Weekly charts ===
Chart (1985–1986)	Peak position
Australia (Kent Music Report)	3
Austria (Ö3 Austria Top 40)	11
Belgium (VRT Top 30 Flanders)	1
Canada Retail Singles (The Record)	1
Canada 100 Singles (RPM)	1
Canada Adult Contemporary (RPM)	1
Finland (Suomen virallinen lista)	4
France (SNEP)	3
Ireland (IRMA)	1
Netherlands (Dutch Top 40)	11
Netherlands (Single Top 100)	17
New Zealand (Recorded Music NZ)	1
Norway (VG-lista)	5
Portugal (Associação Fonográfica Portuguesa)	1
South Africa (Springbok)	7
Spain (AFYVE)	1
Sweden (Sverigetopplistan)	3
Switzerland (Schweizer Hitparade)	5
UK Singles (OCC)	3
US Billboard Hot 100	1
US Adult Contemporary (Billboard)	1
US Dance Club Songs (Billboard)	1
West Germany (GfK)	12

Chart (2025)	Peak position
Poland (Polish Airplay Top 100)	66

=== Year-end charts ===
Chart (1985)	Rank
Australia (Kent Music Report)	29
Canada (RPM)	9
New Zealand	34
UK	37
US Billboard Hot 100	22

== Certifications ==
Region	Certification	Certified units/sales
France (SNEP)	Gold	500,000^{*}
New Zealand (RMNZ)	Gold	15,000^{‡}
United Kingdom (BPI)	Silver	250,000^{^}
^{*} Sales figures based on certification alone.^{^} Shipments figures based on certification alone.^{‡} Sales+streaming figures based on certification alone.

== Personnel ==
- Stevie Wonder – lead vocal, synthesizers, drums
- Luther Vandross – lead vocal, background vocal
- Syreeta Wright, Philip Bailey (Earth Wind & Fire), Keith John, Melody McCully, Billy Durham, Peter Byrne (Naked Eyes), Renee Hardaway, Darryl Phinnessee - background vocal

== Cover versions ==
- Puerto Rican salsa musician Bobby Valentin covered the song in 1986. His cover peaked at number 23 on the Hot Latin Tracks chart.

== See also ==
- List of RPM number-one singles of 1985
- List of number-one singles of 1985 (Ireland)
- List of number-one singles in 1985 (New Zealand)
- List of Hot 100 number-one singles of 1985 (U.S.)
- List of number-one R&B singles of 1985 (U.S.)
- List of number-one adult contemporary singles of 1985 (U.S.)
- List of number-one dance singles of 1985 (U.S.)
