= The Mac Band =

American R&B group

- Origin: Flint, Michigan, U.S.
- Genres: R&B
- Years active: 1987–1991
- Labels: MCA Records; Unidisc
- Past members: Ray McCampbell; Charles McCampbell; Derrick McCampbell; Kelvin McCampbell; Ray Flippin; Rodney Frazier; Mark Harper; Sly Fuller

The Mac Band was an American R&B group from Flint, Michigan, formed by four brothers as the primary vocalists. They are best remembered for their 1988 hit "Roses Are Red".

== Overview ==
The group's first album, The Mac Band featuring the McCampbell Brothers included production by Babyface and members of Atlantic Starr, and one of the tracks from the album, "Roses Are Red" reached No. 1 on the U.S. R&B chart and reached the top 10 of the UK Singles Chart. Several additional singles were released from this album, with a couple of them becoming minor R&B hits.

Their second album, mostly written by Gary Taylor, was not as successful.

Charles McCampbell now runs a music studio in Duncanville, Texas.

Derrick McCampbell (D-Mac) is the Worship Leader for "The Bridge" service at Stonebridge United Methodist Church in McKinney, Texas. He also follows his basketball passion by leading his signature D-Mac Hoops Basketball camps across the Dallas metro area. The camps are focused on team building, basketball skills, and Christian values.

== Members ==
- Ray McCampbell – vocals, saxophone
- Derrick McCampbell – vocals, flute
- Charles McCampbell – vocals, guitar
- Kelvin McCampbell – vocals
- Ray Flippen – bass
- Rodney Frazier – keyboards
- Mark Harper – guitar
- Sly Fuller – drums

== Discography ==
=== Studio albums ===
Year	Album	Label	Peak chart positions		
Year	Album	Label	US	US R&B	UK
1988	Mac Band featuring the McCampbell Brothers	MCA Records	109	22	81
1990	Love U 2 the Limit	MCA Records	—	—	—
1991	The Real Deal	Unidisc	—	78	—
"—" denotes releases that did not chart or were not released in that territory.

=== Singles ===
Year	Single	Peak chart positions	
Year	Single	US R&B	UK
1987	"Do It for You" (Budweiser Showdown)	―	—
1988	"Jealous"	―	90
1988	"Stuck"	25	―
1988	"Roses Are Red"	1	8
1988	"Stalemate"	―	40
1988	"That's the Way I Look at Love"	70	―
1989	"Got to Get Over You"	―	―
1990	"Love U 2 the Limit"	52	―
1990	"Someone to Love"	27	―
1991	"I Could Never Say Goodbye"	―	―
1991	"Everythang"	73	―
"—" denotes releases that did not chart.
