= Roses Are Red (The Mac Band song) =

Single by The Mac Band featuring the McCampbell Brothers

from the album The Mac Band featuring the McCampbell Brothers
- Released: June 10, 1988
- Recorded: 1987
- Genre: R&B, new jack swing
- Length: 5:48
- Label: MCA
- Songwriter(s): L.A. Reid, Babyface
- Producer(s): L.A. Reid, Babyface

"Roses Are Red" is a song by the Mac Band featuring the McCampbell Brothers, released as a single in June 1988. It is from their debut album The Mac Band featuring the McCampbell Brothers and was produced by LA Reid and Kenneth "Babyface" Edmonds.

The single was their most successful of six chart singles on the US Billboard Hot Black Singles chart, peaking at number one for one week on that chart. "Roses Are Red" did not chart on the Billboard Hot 100. It did, however, reach number 8 on the UK Singles Chart.

== Music video ==
The official music video was directed by Jane Simpson.

== Charts ==
Chart (1988)	Peak position
Belgium (Ultratop 50 Flanders)	18
Germany (GfK)	20
Ireland (IRMA)	18
Netherlands (Single Top 100)	12
New Zealand (Recorded Music NZ)	50
UK Singles (OCC)	8
US Hot R&B/Hip-Hop Songs (Billboard)	1
