= You Will Know =

1987 single by Stevie Wonder

Single by Stevie Wonder

from the album Characters
- B-side: "Instrumental"
- Released: 1987
- Studio: Wonderland Recording Studios, Los Angeles
- Genre: R&B, soul
- Length: 5:00
- Label: Tamla
- Songwriter: Stevie Wonder
- Producers: Stevie Wonder; Gary Olazabal

Stevie Wonder singles chronology
"Skeletons" (1987)	"You Will Know" (1987)	"Get It" (1987)

Professional ratings
Review scores
Source	Rating
Number One	4/5 stars

"You Will Know" is a song written and recorded by American R&B singer-songwriter Stevie Wonder, taken from his 1987 Characters album. It is the opening track on the album, and is the second single from the album as well. This is Stevie Wonder's 20th and final number-one R&B hit single. Wonder performed the song along with R&B quartet Jodeci and Mary J. Blige on an episode of The Arsenio Hall Show in late 1992.

== Chart performance ==
In March 1988, the song reached number 77 on the US Billboard Hot 100, number 1 on the R&B chart, "You Will Know" also peaked at number 16 on the Adult Contemporary charts.

== Critical reception ==
Karen Swayne from Number One wrote, "This isn't one of the best tracks, but there's a warmth and humanity to it that means all but the hardest hearted will forgive him (for) crooning trite platitudes like 'problems have solutions/trust and I will show.' Some people might even believe him. And why not."

Ed Hogan of Allmusic took note that "Originally starting out as a romantic love song, "You Will Know" evolved into a song about the greatest love of all, the love of God. The song's main character has lost his way in life, lost his hope and is comforted by: "You will know/Troubled heart you'll know/Problems have solutions/Trust and I will show."

Jon Pareles of the New York Times described You Will Know as "a typically lush Wonder ballad with verses about a drug user and a struggling single parent; the chorus, presumably a voice from heaven, says, Trust and I will show. . .Every life has reason/ for I made it so."

== Charts ==
Chart (1988)	Peak Position
US Adult Contemporary (Billboard)	16
US Billboard Hot 100	77
US Hot R&B/Hip-Hop Songs (Billboard)	1
