= Castles in the Sky (song) =

2000 single by Ian Van Dahl

Single by Ian Van Dahl featuring Marsha

from the album Ace
- Released: 2000
- Genre: Trance
- Length: 3:46
- Label: Antler-Subway
- Songwriters: Erik Vanspauwen, Christophe Chantzis, Martine Theeuwen (Marsha)
- Producers: Erik Vanspauwen, Christophe Chantzis

Ian Van Dahl singles chronology
| "Castles in the Sky" (2000) | "Will I?" (2001) |

Music video
- Ian Van Dahl - Castles In The Sky (Official Video) on YouTube

"Castles in the Sky" is a song by Belgian music project Ian Van Dahl from their debut album, Ace (2002). The vocalist is Belgian singer Marsha, who also co-wrote the song. The single was released in Europe in 2000 and the United Kingdom in 2001. The song was a modest success in mainland Europe and was a hit in the United Kingdom, peaking at number three on the UK Singles Chart and number one on the Scottish Singles Chart for two weeks.

== Background ==
Belgian singer-songwriter Martine D. J. Theeuwen, better known as Marsha, heard that brothers and musicians Erik and Geert Vanspauwen were looking for a vocalist with experience in dance music. After getting in touch, Marsha had a successful audition and began working with the brothers until Geert "felt he was no longer needed" and quit, leaving just Erik and Marsha. About a year later, Christophe Chantzis joined the team and Marsha was given a demo that would ultimately become "Castles in the Sky". According to Marsha, A&S recordings took the song to the Midem festival and the song was subsequently "signed for eight countries." Though Vanspauwen and Chantzis are credited as co-writers of the song along with Marsha, she claimed: "The vocal melody and the lyrics of 'Castles in the Sky' are mine. No co-writers, the lyrics were taken as I wrote them." She went on to note that Chantzis "hated" the lyrics and the vocals, leading him to produce the Absolom remix without any vocals.

Controversially, however, Marsha was axed from any live performances, as three dancers (including Cindy Mertens) took her place. Later, Mertens and the dancers were also dropped, and Annemie Coenen became the frontwoman for the group. While initially lipsyncing to Marsha's vocals in live performances as well, a version of the song with Coenen's vocals was eventually released on the album Ace.

== Music video ==
There are two different videos for the song, both of which feature Cindy Mertens miming to Marsha's vocals. The first uses the regular radio edit, and shows a selection of dancers in an underground sewer. The second video uses the Peter Luts radio edit and features clips of an instrument being played amongst clips of the original video.

== Track listings ==
Belgian CD single (2000)

1. "Castles in the Sky" (radio mix) – 3:49
2. "Castles in the Sky" (Peter Luts remix) – 7:19

Dutch maxi-CD single

1. "Castles in the Sky" (Peter Luts radio edit) – 3:18
2. "Castles in the Sky" (radio mix) – 3:49
3. "Castles in the Sky" (Peter Luts club mix) – 6:46
4. "Castles in the Sky" (Absolom remix) – 7:15

UK CD single

1. "Castles in the Sky" (radio edit) – 3:10
2. "Castles in the Sky" (original club mix) – 6:42
3. "Castles in the Sky" (Coast 2 Coast mix) – 6:25

UK 12-inch single

A1. "Castles in the Sky" (original club mix) – 6:42
B1. "Castles in the Sky" (Coast 2 Coast mix) – 6:25
B2. "Castles in the Sky" (Wippenberg club mmix) – 5:47

US 12-inch single

A1. "Castles in the Sky" (extended mix) – 6:42
A2. "Castles in the Sky" (Absolom remix) – 6:42
B1. "Castles in the Sky" (Peter Luts remix) – 7:15
B2. "Castles in the Sky" (Perfect Sphere remix) – 8:20

US maxi-CD single

1. "Castles in the Sky" (radio edit) – 3:45
2. "Castles in the Sky" (extended mix) – 6:42
3. "Castles in the Sky" (Peter Luts remix) – 7:15
4. "Castles in the Sky" (Perfect Sphere remix) – 8:20
5. "Castles in the Sky" (Absolom remix) – 6:42
6. "Castles in the Sky" (De Donatis remix) – 7:05
7. "Castles in the Sky" (Wippenberg remix) – 5:47

== Charts ==
=== Weekly charts ===
| Chart (2000) | Peak position |
|---|---|
| Belgium (Ultratip Bubbling Under Flanders) | 16 |

| Chart (2001–2003) | Peak position |
|---|---|
| Australia (ARIA) | 57 |
| Belgium (Ultratop 50 Flanders) | 35 |
| Canada (Nielsen SoundScan) | 17 |
| Denmark (Tracklisten) | 18 |
| Europe (Eurochart Hot 100) | 14 |
| Germany (GfK) | 43 |
| Ireland (IRMA) | 13 |
| Ireland Dance (IRMA) | 2 |
| Netherlands (Dutch Top 40) | 28 |
| Netherlands (Single Top 100) | 43 |
| Romania (Romanian Top 100) | 14 |
| Scottish Singles Sales (Official Charts) | 1 |
| Spain (Promusicae) | 13 |
| Sweden (Sverigetopplistan) | 51 |
| Switzerland (Schweizer Hitparade) | 90 |
| UK Singles (Official Charts) | 3 |
| UK Dance (Official Charts) | 1 |
| US Billboard Hot 100 | 91 |
| US Dance Singles Sales (Billboard) | 13 |
| US Dance Airplay (Billboard) | 33 |

=== Year-end charts ===
| Chart (2001) | Position |
|---|---|
| Canada (Nielsen SoundScan) | 87 |
| Ireland (IRMA) | 56 |
| Romania (Romanian Top 100) | 52 |
| UK Singles (OCC) | 22 |

== Certifications ==
| Region | Certification | Certified units/sales |
|---|---|---|
| United Kingdom (BPI) | Platinum | 600,000^{‡} |
^{‡} Sales+streaming figures based on certification alone.
