= Celebration (AnnaGrace song) =

Single by AnnaGrace

from the album Ready to Dare
- Released: 18 May 2010
- Recorded: 2009
- Genre: Eurodance, electronica, Deep House
- Length: 3:20
- Label: Sinuz
- Songwriter(s): Peter Luts, Annemie Coenen
- Producer(s): Peter Luts

AnnaGrace singles chronology
"Love Keeps Calling" (2009)	"Celebration" (2010)	"Ready to Fall in Love" (2012)

"Celebration" is the fourth single released by the Belgian duo AnnaGrace, formerly known as Ian Van Dahl. The track is the group's fourth single following their 2008 debut single "You Make Me Feel", 2009 second single "Let the Feelings Go" and 2009 third single "Love Keeps Calling".

== Track listing ==
- Digital EP
1. "Celebration" (Radio Edit) – 3:20
2. "Celebration" (Extended Mix) – 5:30
3. "Celebration" (Firebeatz Remix) – 6:32
4. "Celebration" (Nash & Pepper vs Erik Lake Remix) – 5:43

== Chart performance ==
Chart	Peak position
Belgian Singles Chart (Flanders)	21
Dutch Singles Chart	85
Turkish Singles Chart	32
