= Pray (Lasgo song) =

2002 single by Lasgo

Single by Lasgo

from the album Some Things
- Released: 2002
- Length: 3:19
- Label: Antler-Subway
- Songwriters: Peter Luts, David Vervoort
- Producers: Peter Luts, David Vervoort

Lasgo singles chronology
"Alone" (2001)	"Pray" (2002)	"Surrender" (2002)

"Pray" is a song by Belgian electronic music trio Lasgo, which is also a track on their debut album, Some Things (2001). The song was released in 2002 as the third single, after "Something" and "Alone". It peaked inside the top 20 in several countries. In Spain, "Pray" reached number eight and became the band's only top-10 hit.

== Music video ==
The music video was uploaded to Lasgo's official YouTube channel on 1 September 2007. The video features the band driving and sailing across the country with one member filming on an old camera. There is a saturated filter on the video.

== Charts ==
=== Weekly charts ===
Chart (2002–2003)	Peak position
Australia (ARIA)	71
Austria (Ö3 Austria Top 40)	43
Belgium (Ultratop 50 Flanders)	11
Europe (Eurochart Hot 100)	54
Germany (GfK)	31
Ireland (IRMA)	44
Ireland Dance (IRMA)	6
Netherlands (Dutch Top 40)	33
Netherlands (Single Top 100)	32
Scotland Singles (OCC)	5
Spain (Promusicae)	8
UK Singles (OCC)	17

=== Year-end charts ===
Chart (2002)	Position
Belgium (Ultratop 50 Flanders)	68
