= Alone (Lasgo song) =

2001 single by Lasgo

Single by Lasgo

from the album Some Things
- Released: 2001
- Length: 4:01
- Label: Antler-Subway
- Songwriters: Peter Luts, David Vervoort
- Producers: Peter Luts, David Vervoort

Lasgo singles chronology
| "Something" (2001) | "Alone" (2001) | "Pray" (2002) |

"Alone" is a song by Belgian dance trio Lasgo. It was released in 2001 as the second single from their debut album, Some Things (2002). The song became a top-10 hit in Flanders and the United Kingdom, as well as on the US Billboard Dance Radio Airplay chart.

== Charts ==
=== Weekly charts ===
| Chart (2001–2004) | Peak position |
|---|---|
| Australia (ARIA) | 43 |
| Austria (Ö3 Austria Top 40) | 25 |
| Belgium (Ultratop 50 Flanders) | 3 |
| Europe (Eurochart Hot 100) | 39 |
| Germany (GfK) | 22 |
| Ireland (IRMA) | 34 |
| Ireland Dance (IRMA) | 4 |
| Netherlands (Single Top 100) | 46 |
| Romania (Romanian Top 100) | 17 |
| Scotland Singles (Official Charts) | 3 |
| Spain (Promusicae) | 18 |
| Switzerland (Schweizer Hitparade) | 89 |
| UK Singles (Official Charts) | 7 |
| UK Dance (Official Charts) | 5 |
| US Billboard Hot 100 | 83 |
| US Dance Radio Airplay (Billboard) | 2 |

=== Year-end charts ===
| Chart (2001) | Position |
|---|---|
| Belgium (Ultratop 50 Flanders) | 60 |

| Chart (2002) | Position |
|---|---|
| UK Singles (OCC) | 162 |

| Chart (2004) | Position |
|---|---|
| US Dance Radio Airplay (Billboard) | 13 |

== Release history ==
| Region | Date | Format(s) | Label(s) | Ref. |
|---|---|---|---|---|
| Belgium | 2001 | CD | Antler-Subway | |
| United Kingdom | 12 August 2002 | 12-inch vinyl; CD | Positiva | |
| United Kingdom | 26 August 2002 | 12-inch vinyl | Positiva | |
