= Out of My Mind (Lasgo song) =

Single by Lasgo

from the album Smile
- Released: November 24, 2008
- Recorded: 2009
- Length: 3:00
- Label: Sinuz
- Songwriter(s): Jef Martens, Peter Luts
- Producer(s): Peter Luts

Lasgo singles chronology
"Out of My Mind" (2008)	"Gone" (2009)

"Out of My Mind" is the first single released by the Belgian dance group Lasgo after the addition of Jelle Van Dael as vocals. The single achieved chart success in the Netherlands and Belgium, making it into the top 10. The song was also released in the UK at the beginning of 2009 by the up-and-coming dance label Hard2Beat records however, as it was given a digital only release, but the song failed to chart.

== Track listing ==
- CD Maxi-Single (Belgium and United States)
1. "Out of My Mind" (Radio Edit) – 3:00
2. "Out of My Mind" (Extended Mix) – 4:37
3. "Out of My Mind" (Sebastian Dali Remix) – 7:11
4. "Out of My Mind" (Felix Project Remix) – 6:46

== Chart performance ==
Chart	Peak position
Belgian Singles Chart (Flanders)	7
Belgian Dance Charts	2
Dutch Singles Chart	30
GFK Dutch Top 100 Singles	26
Turkish Singles Chart	80
U.S. Billboard Hot Dance Airplay	7
