= Gone (Lasgo song) =

Single by Lasgo

from the album Smile
- Released: March 2, 2009
- Recorded: 2009
- Length: 3:00
- Label: Sinuz
- Songwriters: Jef Martens, Peter Luts
- Producer: Peter Luts

Lasgo singles chronology
"Out of My Mind" (2008)	"Gone" (2009)	"Lost" (2009)

"Gone" is the second single released by the Belgian dance group Lasgo after the addition of Jelle Van Dael on vocals.

== Track listing ==
- CD Maxi-Single (Belgium and United States)
1. "Gone" (Radio Edit) – 3:00
2. "Gone" (Extended Mix) – 4:51
3. "Gone" (Sebastian Dali Remix) – 6:44
4. "Gone" (Felix Project Remix) – 4:51
- 12" Vinyl (Belgium)

A1. "Gone" (Extended Mix) – 4:51
A2. "Gone" (Felix Project Remix) – 4:51
B. "Gone" (Sebastian Dali Remix) – 6:44

== Release history ==
Country	Date	Format	Label
Belgium	March 2, 2009	CD single	Sinuz
Belgium	March 2009	12-inch single	Sinuz
United States	June 2, 2009	Digital download	Robbins
United States	June 16, 2009	CD single	Robbins

== Chart performance ==
=== Weekly charts ===
Chart (2009)	Peak position
Belgium (Ultratop 50 Flanders)	5
Belgium (Ultratip Bubbling Under Wallonia)	21
Finland (Suomen virallinen lista)	13
Netherlands (Dutch Top 40)	15
Netherlands (Single Top 100)	17
US Dance/Mix Show Airplay (Billboard)	15

=== Year-end charts ===
Chart (2009)	Position
Belgium (Ultratop Flanders)	39
Netherlands (Dutch Top 40)	59
