= Ready to Dare =

Studio album by AnnaGrace
- Released: 17 June 2010
- Recorded: 2008–2010
- Genre: Eurodance, house
- Length: 45:40
- Label: N.E.W.S.
- Producer: Peter Luts

Singles from Ready to Dare
- 1. "You Make Me Feel" Released: 5 June 2008; 2. "Let the Feelings Go" Released: 27 April 2009; 3. "Love Keeps Calling" Released: 11 December 2009; 4. "Celebration" Released: 17 May 2010; 5. "Don't Let Go" Released: 4 October 2010

Ready to Dare is the only studio album by Belgian dance act AnnaGrace. The album was released on 7 June 2010 and includes the singles "You Make Me Feel", "Let the Feelings Go", "Love Keeps Calling", "Celebration" and "Don't Let Go".

== Track listing ==
All tracks are written by Annemie Coenen and Peter Luts.

No.	Title	Length
1.	"Ready to Dare"	1:47
2.	"Let the Feelings Go"	3:41
3.	"Celebration"	3:20
4.	"Don't Let Go"	4:04
5.	"You Do Want Me"	4:04
6.	"Should Have Known Better"	5:22
7.	"Love Keeps Calling"	3:31
8.	"To Be Loved"	5:27
9.	"No More"	3:34
10.	"Beat of My Heart"	3:36
11.	"Paradise"	4:06
12.	"You Make Me Feel"	3:08
