= Love Keeps Calling =

Single by AnnaGrace

from the album Ready to Dare
- Released: 11 December 2009
- Recorded: 2009
- Genre: Eurodance, progressive house, deep house
- Length: 3:32
- Label: Sinuz
- Songwriter(s): Peter Luts, Annemie Coenen
- Producer(s): Peter Luts

AnnaGrace singles chronology
"Let the Feelings Go" (2009)	"Love Keeps Calling" (2009)	"Celebration" (2010)

Alternative cover
- U.S. cover

Music video
- "You Make Me Feel" on YouTube

"Love Keeps Calling" is the third single released by the Belgian act AnnaGrace, following their 2008 debut single "You Make Me Feel" and 2009 second single "Let the Feelings Go", both of which reached number No.1 on the U.S. Billboard Hot Dance Airplay chart. The song was released in Belgium by Sinuz Recordings and in the United States by Robbins Entertainment. The single also gave the act the distinction of becoming the first act to have reached number one three consecutive times on Billboard's Hot Dance Airplay chart, all this without an album or CD release.

== Track listing ==
- CD Maxi-Single
1. "Love Keeps Calling" (Radio Edit) – 3:31
2. "Love Keeps Calling" (Extended) – 5:44
3. "Love Keeps Calling" (Basto! Impression) – 7:02
4. "Love Keeps Calling" (Lucky Charmes & Tony Verdult Remix) – 6:23

== Release history ==
Country	Date	Format	Label
Belgium	11 December 2009	CD single	Sinuz
Belgium	28 December 2009	Digital download	Sinuz
United States	12 January 2010	Digital download	Robbins

== Chart performance ==
=== Weekly charts ===
Chart (2009–2010)	Peak position
Belgium (Ultratop 50 Flanders)	23
Netherlands (Dutch Top 40)	15
Netherlands (Single Top 100)	29
Turkish Singles Chart	50
US Dance/Mix Show Airplay (Billboard)	1

=== Year-end charts ===
Chart (2010)	Position
Netherlands (Dutch Top 40)	82
US Dance/Mix Show Airplay (Billboard)	13
