= Scoop (dance project) =

Belgian dance music group

- Origin: Belgium
- Genres: Dance
- Years active: 1998-2000
- Labels: A&S Productions
- Past members: Daniel Maze; Jan Vervloet

Scoop was a Belgian dance group. Originally it was a solo project by producer Daniel Maze. After the first release "Wings of Love" in 1998, Fiocco producer Jan Vervloet joined Scoop. The production was signed in Belgium, the Netherlands, Germany, UK, Norway, Finland and Spain. "Wings of Love" contains a sample of John Foxx's 1980 first solo single "Underpass" and was remixed by Tiësto in 1999. The second single was the theme song for the '99 Love Parade in Berlin. "Drop It" became a No. 1 hit in the club charts in Belgium and the Netherlands, and also topped the mainstream charts in both countries. To promote the release, a video clip was created with images from the '98 Love Parade mixed with the Scoop logo.

Just like the previous release, the third song "Rock the House" (2000) was based on the same concept: a simple catchy tune and a powerful quote. For "Drop It", that was "we're gonna do a song that you've never heard before..", a sample from Otis Redding's "Good to Me". "Rock the House" only featured the title words and charted in the top 10 in Belgium [#9) and the Netherlands (#4). The song was written by Daniel Maze and Jan Vervloet and was remixed by DJ Peter Luts of dance act Lasgo. Again the music video only contained a dancing crowd at an indoor house festival mixed with the Scoop logo. All the videos were directed by Peter Van Eyndt who directed for many Belgian and Dutch artists like Kate Ryan, Milk Inc, Clouseau, Zornik and Krezip.

== Discography ==
=== Singles ===
Year	Single	Peak chart positions		Album
Year	Single	BEL (Vl)	NED	Album
1999	"Drop It"	1	1	Singles only
2000	"Rock the House"	4	8	Singles only
"—" denotes releases that did not chart
