= Absolom =

Belgian dance project

- Origin: Belgium
- Genres: Trance
- Years active: 1997–2001
- Labels: Antler Subway/EMI (Belgium); Dos Or Die Recordings (Germany); Sony Music Entertainment (France); Xtreme Records (US)
- Members: Christophe Chantzis; Jimmy Goldschmitz; Pascale Feront

Absolom was a Belgian dance project produced by Christophe Chantzis and DJ Jimmy Goldschmitz. The group was popular in Europe by the end of the 1990s. For remixer and main-producer Chantzis the project was his first major effort in the Belgian dance scene. Vocals were done by Pascale Feront who gained some attention by entering the final of The Soundmix Show. A live-act was put together, consisting of singer Pascal Feront, two professional female dancers (Cindy and Ellen) and Christophe Chantzis on keyboard. He also supplied the additional vocals on some singles.

Christophe Chantzis produced several remixes under the Absolom project name for artists like Tiësto, Fiocco, Zohra, Praga Khan, DJ Visage, Future Breez and Ace of Base.

== ”Secret” ==
The debut single “Secret” was Absolom's most successful single. The B-side, the more trance-based track “Baby Boomers”, was also very popular. The 12” release of “Secret” topped the Belgian and Spanish Dance Charts by the end of 1997. A few weeks later the CD-single reached the top 10 in both countries. Several other countries followed in 1998 and Absolom was signed in France, Italy, UK, Germany, Australia, Switzerland, Scandinavia, Israel and South-Africa. “Secret” was later on remixed by famous DJ's as Quicksilver and Vincent De Moor. In Belgium they were signed by Antler Subway, the record label with other (inter)national Eurodance acts like Milk Inc, Fiocco, Jessy, 2 Fabiola, Lasgo and Ian Van Dahl. At the same time Christophe Chantzis became involved with Astroline, another Belgian dance project.

== Other singles ==
After the successful debut single, both producers worked on a follow-up single. In October 1998 they came up with “Where?”, a song that only reached to #21 in the Belgian charts. One year later a third single was released. “The Air” peaked at No. 16, the second highest position since "Secrets". By the time Jimmy Goldschmitz was no longer credited as producer, Absolom returned with one more single called “Stars” in August 2000, but the song failed to chart in Belgium and the rest of Europe. In 2001 the New Jersey–based house/trance label Xtreme Records signed Absolom for “Stars”. After its release in the US the single spent several weeks on the dance charts. In January 2002 the CD-single was released.

== Split ==
By the end of 2000 an album was announced but never released. Instead Christophe Chantzis decided to stop recording songs in 2001 as Absolom after the disappointed European release of “Stars”. He moved on to another successful project and joined the team behind international dance group Ian Van Dahl. Jimmy Goldschmitz became a resident DJ in Belgian clubs like Bar-a-Bar. Singer Pascale Feront went solo and released an album called ‘Real Life” in 2002. Dancer Ellen moved to Praga Khan.

== Discography ==
=== Singles ===
Year	Single	Peak chart positions
Year	Single	BEL (VL)
1998	"Secret"	8
1998	"Where?"	21
1999	"The Air"	16
2000	"Stars"	—
"—" denotes releases that did not chart
