= Feel the Fire (song) =

Single by Astroline
- Released: March 1998
- Recorded: 1997
- Genre: Eurodance, Electronic
- Length: 3:24
- Songwriters: Bart Smolders, Christophe Chantzis, David Vervoort (aka Dave McCullen) and Peter Luts

Astroline singles chronology
"Take Good Care (Of Me)" (1997)	"Feel the Fire" (1998)	"Smiling Faces" (1998)

"Feel the Fire" is a 1998 euro house single by Belgian project Astroline. The song was written and produced by Bart Smolders, Christophe Chantzis, David Vervoort (aka Dave McCullen) and Peter Luts. Vocals were done by Kathleen Goossens. Released in March 1998, "Feel the Fire" is probably the most famous song of the group.

After a successful 12-inch release by the end of 1997 on the Belgian independent record company A&S Productions, the track was released on cd-single by Antler Subway. The single entered the top 10 of the Belgian Ultra Top, where it remained for two weeks at No. 9. It was the follow-up of "Take Good Care (Of Me)".

== Track listings ==
CD-Single

1. "Feel the Fire" (radio edit) (3:24)
2. "Feel the Fire" (DJ Bart club mix) (5:26)

CD-Maxi

1. "Feel the Fire" (radio edit) (3:24)
2. "Feel the Fire" (extended vocal version) (5:52)
3. "Feel The Fire" (DJ Bart club mix) (5:26)
4. "Feel The Fire" (Absolom vocal jam) (5:57)
5. "Feel The Fire" (Absolom full trance) (5:56)
