= Astroline =

Belgian Eurodance music project

- Origin: Belgium
- Genres: Trance
- Years active: 1996–2001
- Labels: Antler Subway; EMI Music Belgium
- Past members: Bart Smolders; Christophe Chantzis; Stefan Wuyts; Peter Luts; Kathleen Goossens; Gert Covers

Astroline were a Belgian Eurodance project by DJ/producer Bart Smolders, Christophe Chantzis (Absolom, Ian Van Dahl) and Stefan Wuyts (DJ Jimmy Goldschmitz & Heliac), who were together from the mid-1990s to the mid-2000s. They are best known for their hit single "Feel The Fire". Vocals were done by Kathleen Goossens. Other producers involved were Gert Corvers and Peter Luts (Lasgo, Ian Van Dahl, Groove Watchers). On stage singer Kathleen Goossens was accompanied by Gert Covers on keyboard and two dancers (An Hoube and Katarina Vincente).

== Biography ==
Their first release "Take Good Care (Of Me)" became a club hit in Belgium and a minor radio hit (#46). Originally the track was released as "Astroline feat. DJ Bart" on 12 inch. For its cd-single release the name "Astroline" was adopted, transforming it from a studioproject to a dance group In the beginning of 1998 their second release "Feel The Fire" topped the Belgian Ultratop Dance Chart in its first week. The single climbed to #9 and became their biggest hit single. Other releases were "Smiling Faces" (1998), "No Way Out" (1999), "Angels" (2000). Their last release was "Close My Eyes" in the summer of 2000. While this single didn't do anything special in Belgium, they had a nice hit with it in Canada in 2001. After Astroline separated, Kathleen Goossens became the singer of dance project Orion Too. Later on, she changed her stage name to Caitlin. Peter Luts started his most successful project to date, Lasgo. In 2001 Kathleen Goossens returned to the dance scene as Orion Too feat. Caitlin. She had two international hits with "You And Me" and "Hope And Wait". She also did vocals for studio project like Airwave and Third Bass.

== Discography ==
=== Singles ===
Year	Single	Peak chart positions
Year	Single	BEL (VL)
1997	"Take Good Care (Of Me)"	46
1998	"Feel the Fire"	9
1998	"Smiling Faces"	12
1999	"No Way Out"	36
2000	"Angels"	32
2000	"Close My Eyes"	42
"—" denotes releases that did not chart
