= Feel the Fire =

Feel the Fire may refer to:

- Feel the Fire (Jermaine Jackson album), 1977
- Feel the Fire (Claudja Barry album), 1979
- Feel the Fire (Reba McEntire album), 1980
- Feel the Fire (Family Brown album), 1985
- Feel the Fire (Overkill album), 1985
- "Feel the Fire" (song), a 1998 song by Astroline
- "Feel the Fiyaaaah", a 2022 song by Metro Boomin and ASAP Rocky featuring Takeoff
- "Feel the Fire", a song by Stephanie Mills from the 1979 album What Cha Gonna Do with My Lovin'
- Aatish: Feel the Fire, a 1994 Indian film
