= Let the Feelings Go =

Single by AnnaGrace

from the album Ready to Dare
- Released: 13 April 2009
- Recorded: 2009
- Genre: Eurodance; progressive house
- Length: 3:26
- Label: Sinuz
- Songwriter(s): Peter Luts; Annemie Coenen
- Producer(s): Peter Luts

AnnaGrace singles chronology
"You Make Me Feel" (2008)	"Let the Feelings Go" (2009)	"Love Keeps Calling" (2009)

Audio sample
- file; help

Music video
- "Let the Feelings Go" on YouTube

"Let the Feelings Go" is a song by Belgian trance project AnnaGrace. The song was a follow-up to their first single "You Make Me Feel" (2008), and like the former, it reached number one on the U.S. Billboard Hot Dance Airplay chart in its 25 July 2009, issue. In the song reached No. 5 on Belgian Charts.

== Track listing ==
- CD maxi-single (Belgium and United States)
1. "Let the Feelings Go" (Radio Edit) – 3:26
2. "Let the Feelings Go" (Extended) – 6:00
3. "Let the Feelings Go" (Peter Luts Remix) – 7:14
4. "Let the Feelings Go" (Sem Thomasson Remix) – 6:30
5. "Let the Feelings Go" (Hardwell Mix) – 5:56
6. "Let the Feelings Go" (Hardwell Dub) – 5:56
- 12" vinyl (Belgium)

A1. "Let the Feelings Go" (Extended Mix) – 6:00
A2. "Let the Feelings Go" (Sem Thomasson Remix) – 6:31
B1. "Let the Feelings Go" (Peter Luts Remix) – 7:13
B2. "Let the Feelings Go" (Hardwell Mix) – 5:56

== Release history ==
Country	Date	Format	Label
Belgium	13 April 2009	12-inch single	Sinuz
Belgium	18 May 2009	CD single	PIAS
United States	12 May 2009	CD single; digital download	Robbins

== Chart performance ==
Chart	Peak position
Belgian Singles Chart (Flanders)	5
Belgian Singles Chart (Wallonia)	10 (Ultratip)
Dutch Singles Chart	26
U.S. Billboard Hot Dance Airplay	1
