= Ellia English =

American entertainer

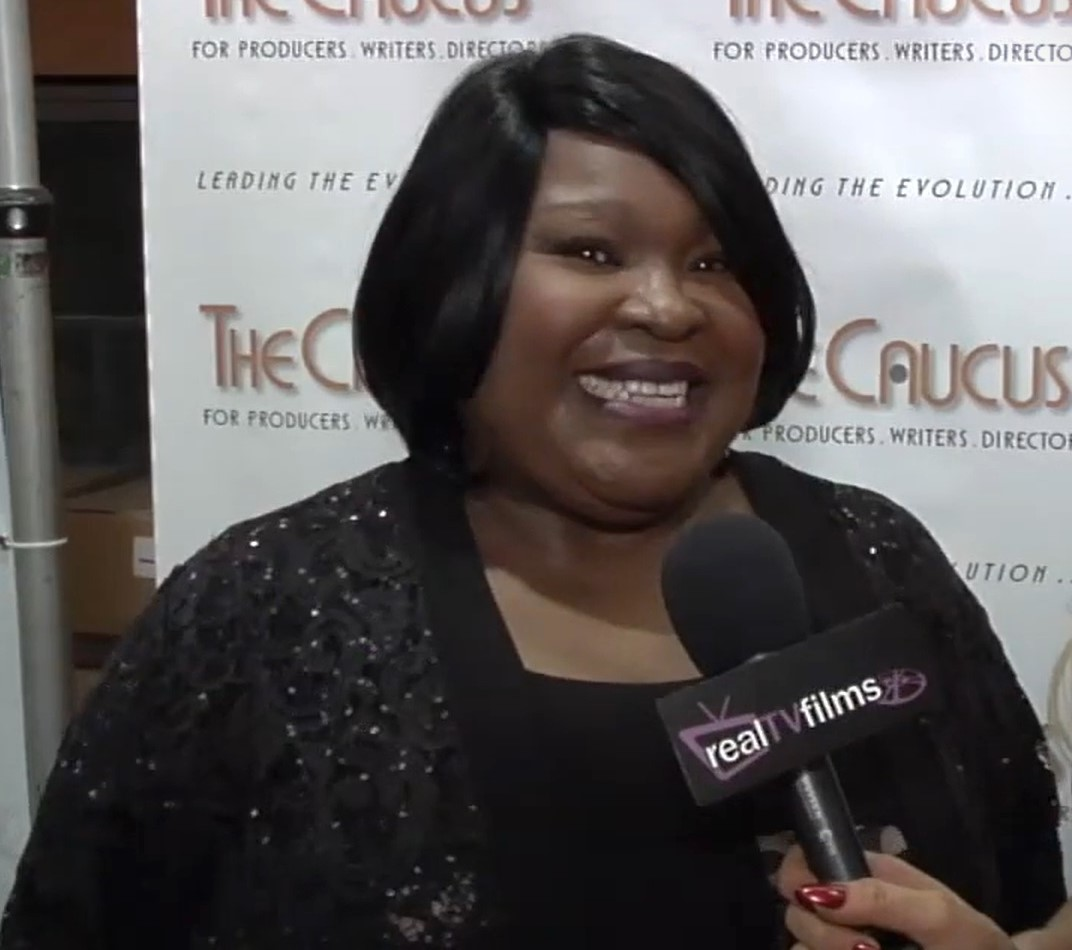
- English interviewed by RealTVfilms in 2016
- Occupations: Singer; actress; pianist; dancer
- Years active: 1982–present

Ellia English is an American theatre actress, musician, and dancer. She is best known for her role as Aunt Helen King on the comedy sitcom The Jamie Foxx Show which originally ran from 1996 to 2001, where she was featured in a central role and was paired onscreen with Garrett Morris, who played her husband Junior King. English also had recurring roles on Curb Your Enthusiasm, Good Luck Charlie, and Code Black.

== Background ==
English made the move to Los Angeles and was a series regular (as Helen King) on The Jamie Foxx Show. Other television credits include Martin, Sinbad, Empty Nest, The 5 Mrs. Buchanans, Love & War, Get Smart, and Thea. She was featured in the made for television movies The Innocent, The Barefoot Executive, and Based on an Untrue Story. On the silver screen, English was featured in Wildcats, Sidewalk Stories, Rain Without Thunder, Block Beauty and Girlfriends. She also co-starred with Steve Guttenberg and James Duval in the psycho horror film Cornered!, directed by Daniel Maze. She won the 2009 New York Horror Film Festival's Best Actress Award for her portrayal of Mona in Cornered.

English maintains homes in Atlanta, Georgia and Los Angeles, California. She currently devotes her time to Big Sisters of Los Angeles and several other children's organizations. Also, in her spare time, she enjoys playing the flute, the piano, reading, walking, biking and many other outdoor activities.

== Filmography ==
- Wildcats (1986) as Marva
- Matchups (2003) as Lynn Williams
- Woman Thou Art Loosed (2004) as Prison Official
- Good Luck Chuck (2007) as Reba
- Semi-Pro (2008) as Quincy
- Cornered! (2009) as Mona
- My Sister's Keeper (2009) as Nurse Alice
- Dance Flick (2009) as Woman on Train

== Television ==
- 2015–18: Code Black: Isabel Mendez (Recurring role)
- 2011: Wilfred: Ruby (2 episodes)
- 2014: Petals on the Wind (tv film): Henny
- 2010–14: Good Luck Charlie: Mary Lou Wentz
- 2007–09 & 24: Curb Your Enthusiasm: Auntie Rae
- 1996–2001: The Jamie Foxx Show: Aunt Helen King (100 episodes)
- 1994 & 96: Martin: Mrs. Booker (3 episodes)
- 1994: The 5 Mrs. Buchanans (1 episode): Social Worker
- 1994: The Innocent (TV): Rev. Poppy
- 1994: The Sinbad Show (1 episode): Receptionist aka Sinbad (UK)
- 1993: Based on an Untrue Story) (TV): Sister Love
- 1989: Great Performances (1 episode): Queenie
- 1986: Wildcats (Uncredited): Marva aka First and Goal
- 1982: Fame (1 episode): Sheila

== Theatre ==
- Love in the Nick of Tyme
- Ain't Misbehavin'
- Ma Rainey's Black Bottom
- Colored Museum
- Dreamgirls
- Romeo and Juliet
- Spunk
- Show Boat
- Barnum
- Nunsense
- One Mo' Time
- Annie Warbucks
