= Theodore Maiman =

American physicist (1927–2007)

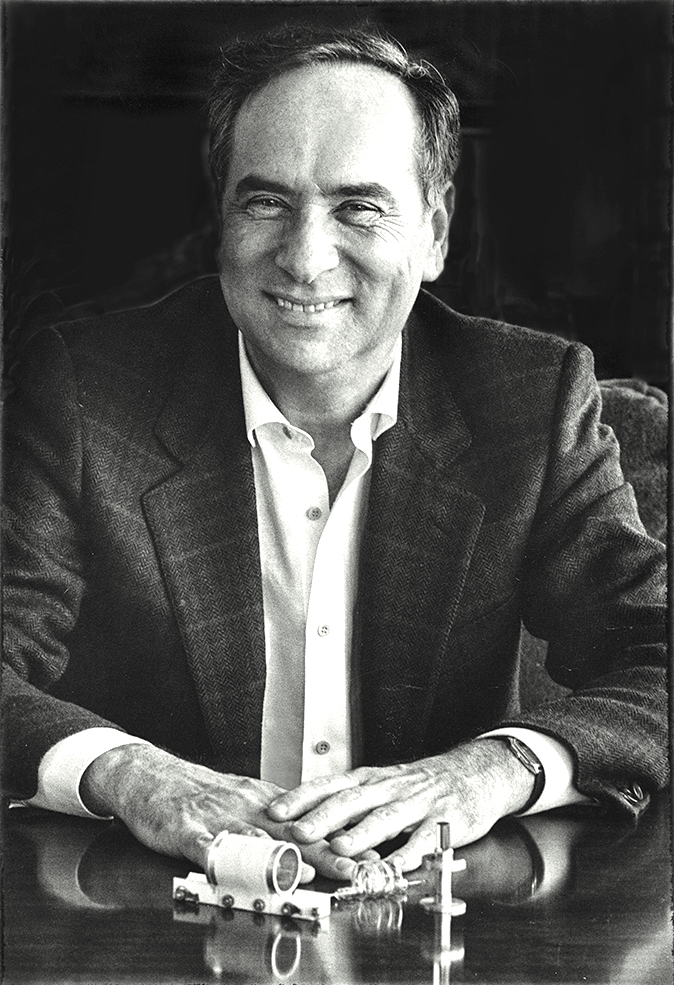
- Maiman with the world's first laser in 1985
- Born: Theodore Harold Maiman; July 11, 1927; Los Angeles, California, U.S.
- Died: May 5, 2007 (aged 79); Vancouver, British Columbia, Canada
- Education: University of Colorado Boulder; Stanford University
- Known for: Inventing the laser
- Awards: Stuart Ballantine Medal (1962); Oliver E. Buckley Condensed Matter Prize (1966); R. W. Wood Prize (1976); Wolf Prize in Physics (1983); Japan Prize (1987)
- Scientific career
- Fields: Physics; electrical engineering
- Workplaces: Hughes Research Laboratories; Quantatron; Korad Corporation
- Thesis: Microwave-optical investigation of the 3³P fine structure in helium (1955)
- Doctoral advisor: Willis Lamb

Theodore Harold Maiman (July 11, 1927 – May 5, 2007) was an American engineer and physicist who is widely credited with the invention of the laser. Maiman's laser led to the subsequent development of many other types of lasers. The laser was successfully fired on May 16, 1960. In a July 7, 1960, press conference in Manhattan, Maiman and his employer, Hughes Aircraft Company, announced the laser to the world. Maiman was granted a patent for his invention, and he received many awards and honors for his work. His experiences in developing the first laser and subsequent related events are recounted in his book, The Laser Odyssey, later being republished in 2018 under a new title, The Laser Inventor: Memoirs of Theodore H. Maiman.

== Early and student life ==
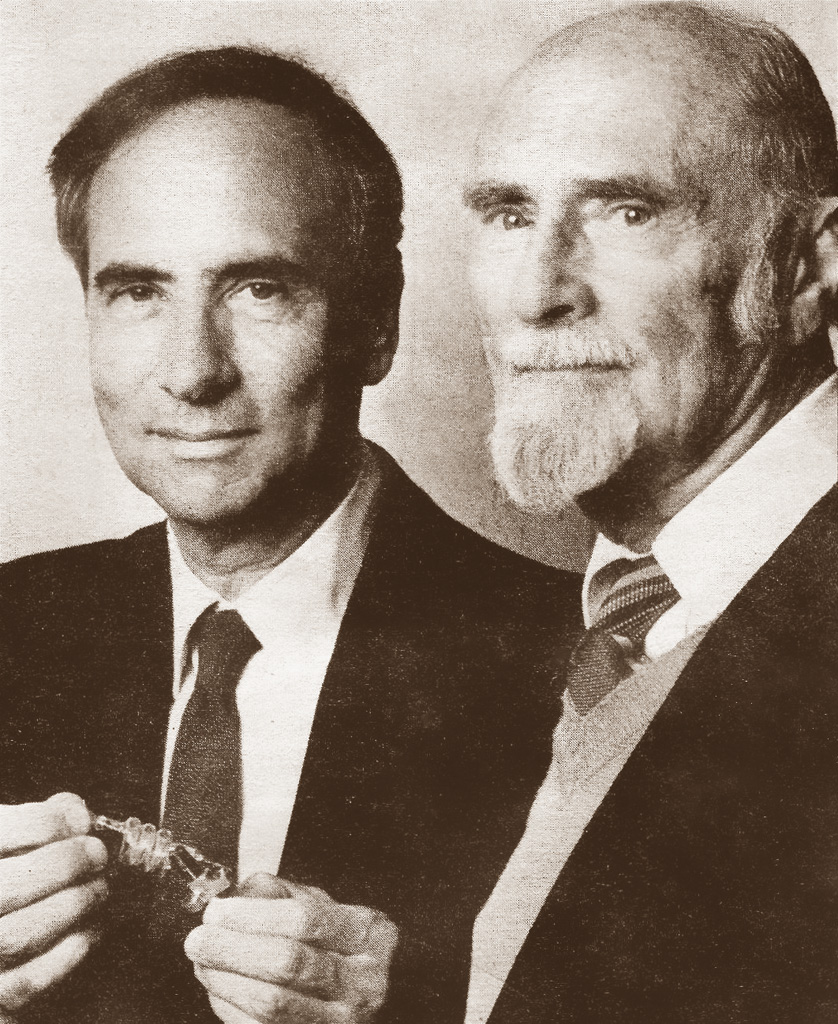
Maiman and his father Abe

Maiman was born in Los Angeles to a Jewish family, Abraham "Abe" Maiman, an electrical engineer and inventor, and Rose Abramson. At a young age his family moved to Denver, Colorado, where he helped his father with experimentation in a home electronics laboratory. Maiman says in his autobiography that "as with most hyperactive kids, I was skinny, some 10–15 pounds underweight", and considers himself to have been a target for Ritalin should it have existed at the time. In his teens Maiman earned money by repairing electric appliances and radios, and after leaving high school was employed as a junior engineer with the National Union Radio Company at age 17.

Following a year's service in the United States Navy at the end of World War II, he earned a B.S. in engineering physics from the University of Colorado Boulder. Maiman then went on to graduate studies at Stanford University where he earned an M.S. in electrical engineering in 1951 and a PhD in physics in 1955.

Maiman's doctoral thesis in experimental physics, under the direction of physicist Willis Lamb, involved detailed microwave-optical measurements of fine structural splittings in excited helium atoms. He also devised laboratory instrumentation for Lamb's experiments. Maiman published two articles jointly with Lamb in Physical Review, the second of which was based on his own thesis research. His thesis experiment was instrumental in his development of the laser.

== Career ==
In 1956 Maiman started work with the Atomic Physics Department of the Hughes Aircraft Company (later Hughes Research Laboratories or HRL Laboratories) in California where he led the ruby maser redesign project for the U.S. Army Signal Corps, reducing it from a 2.5-ton cryogenic device to 4 pounds (1.8 kg) while improving its performance. As a result of this success Maiman persuaded Hughes management to use company funds to support his laser project beginning in mid-1959. On a total budget of $50,000, Maiman turned to the development of a laser based on his own design with a synthetic ruby crystal, which other scientists seeking to make a laser felt would not work.

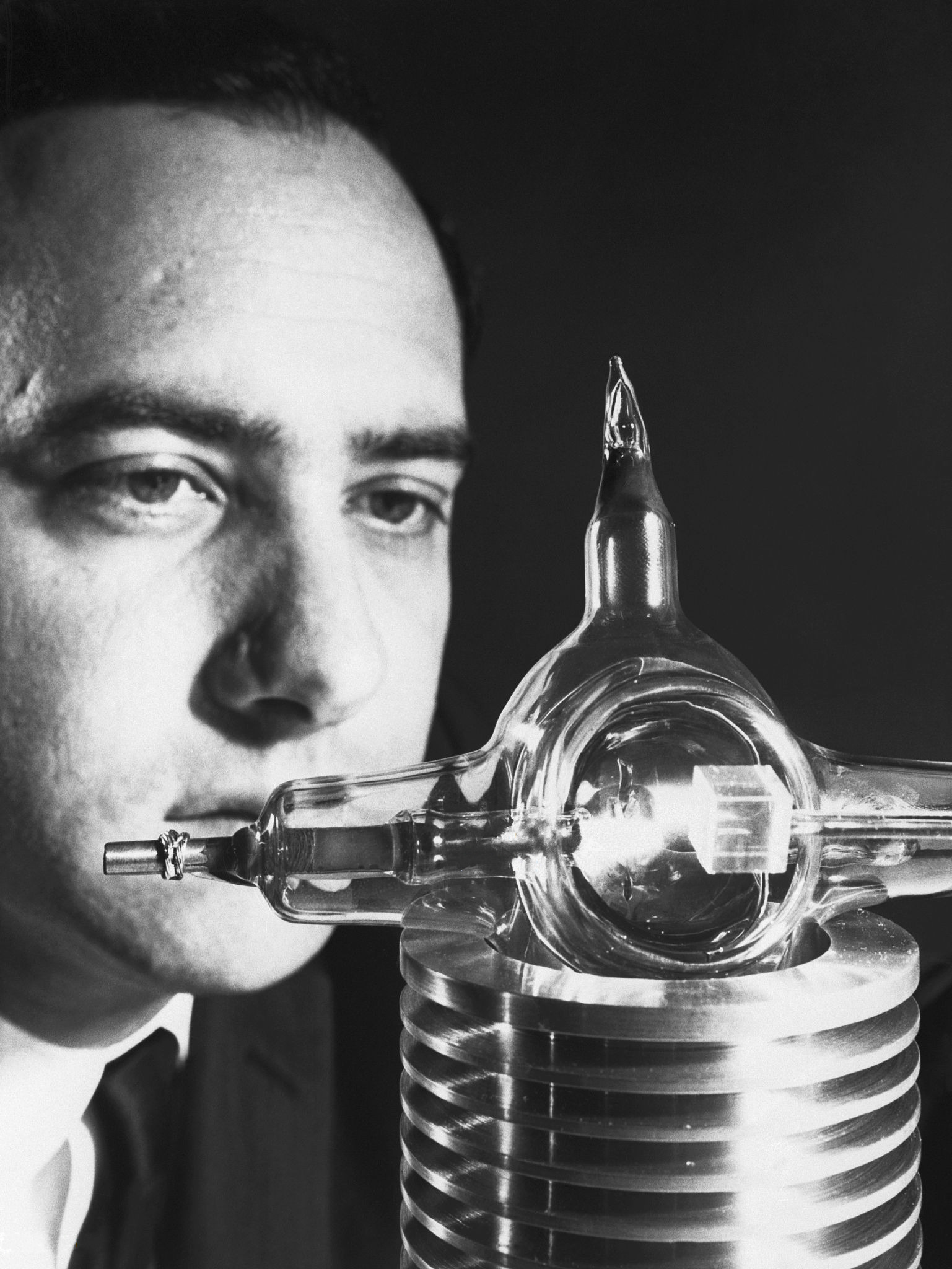
Maiman with his laser in July 1960

On May 16, 1960, at Hughes' Malibu, California, laboratories, Maiman's solid-state pink ruby laser emitted mankind's first coherent light, with rays all the same wavelength and fully in phase. Maiman documented his invention in Nature on August 6, 1960, after two rejections by Samuel A. Goudsmit at Physical Review Letters, besides which he published other scholarly articles describing the science and technology underlying his laser.

Maiman had begun conceptualizing a solid-state laser design even before he undertook the maser project at Hughes. Moving the microwave frequency of masers up the electromagnetic spectrum 50,000-fold to the frequency of light would require finding a feasible lasing medium and excitation source and designing the system. Other major research groups at IBM, Bell Labs, MIT, Westinghouse, RCA and Columbia University, among others, were also pursuing projects to develop a laser.

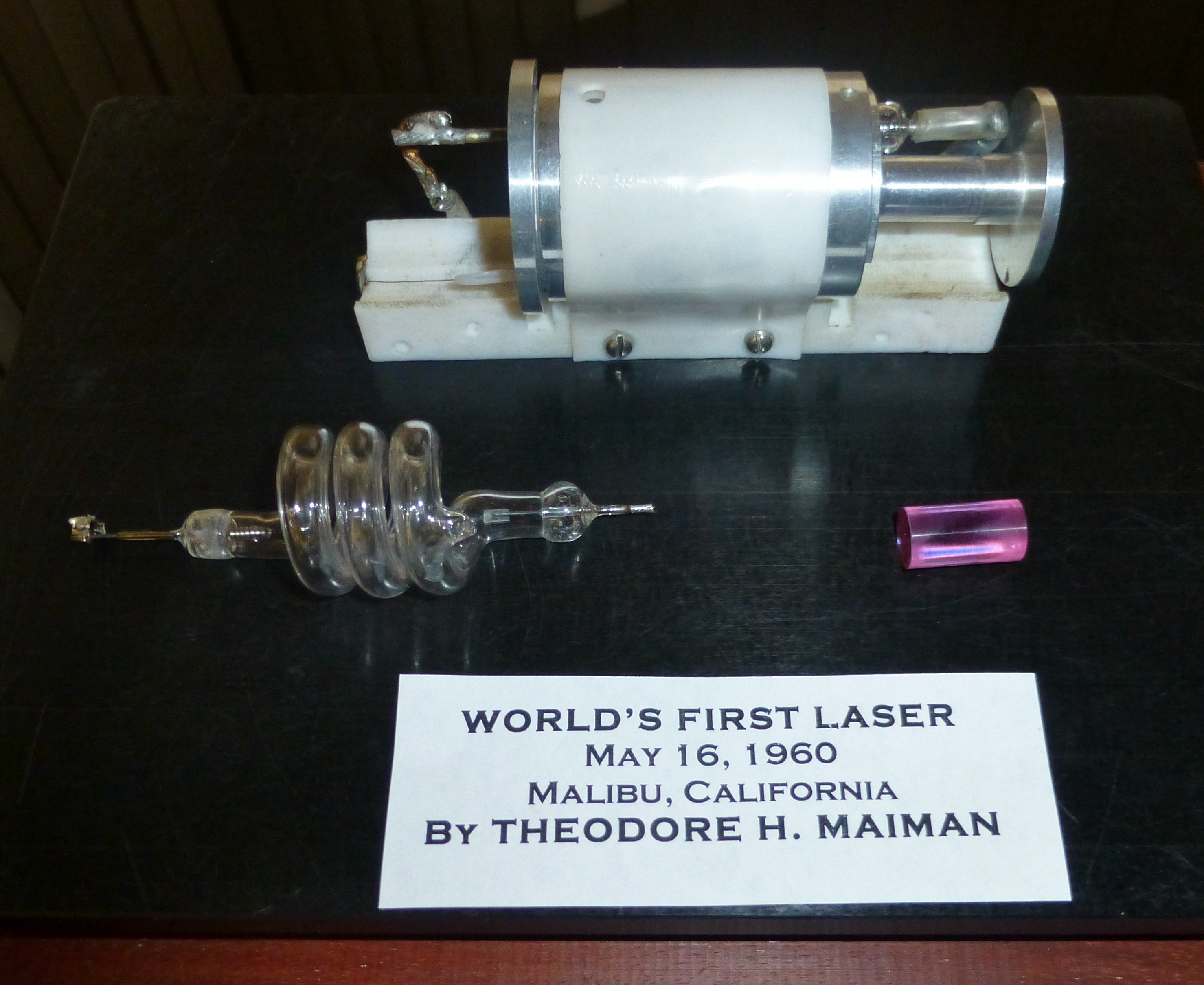
World's first laser

Their work was stimulated by a 1958 paper by Arthur L. Schawlow and Charles H. Townes offering theoretical analysis and a proposal for a gaseous system using potassium vapor excited by a potassium lamp. However Maiman identified multiple flaws in the Schawlow-Townes proposal and the reason for their rejection of a solid-state design, including a significant difference in the band-gap nature of pink rubies and red rubies, and pursued his own vision: "I was the only one that analyzed ruby in enough detail to have the confidence to stick with it." His successful design used synthetic pink ruby crystal grown by the Linde Division of Union Carbide as the active laser medium and a helical xenon flash lamp as the excitation source. As Townes later wrote, "Maiman's laser had several aspects not considered in our theoretical paper, nor discussed by others before the ruby demonstration." One piece of evidence that convinced Maiman (and later the world) that he had lased pink ruby was that "when the crystal was pushed above threshold, we observed a brightness ratio" of the twin red lines "of more than 50 times".

Following his invention of the laser, in 1961 Maiman departed Hughes to join the newly formed Quantatron company, which grew in-house ruby crystals for lasers. Maiman was installed as vice president of the Applied Physics Laboratory, and he hired seven Hughes colleagues. Together they started a Verneuil plant to grow synthetic rubies, which were domestically available at that time only at Linde, who had been chosen by the US government to receive the WW2 technology transferred from Switzerland. "The Swiss for many years used this Verneuil technology to make the jewel bearings in their famous precision watches." Brothers Rick and Tony Pastor were hired by Maiman from Hughes in order to start the Quantatron synthetic ruby plant. Rick devised methods to make ultra-high purity powder, while Tony improved the burner and powder handling process.

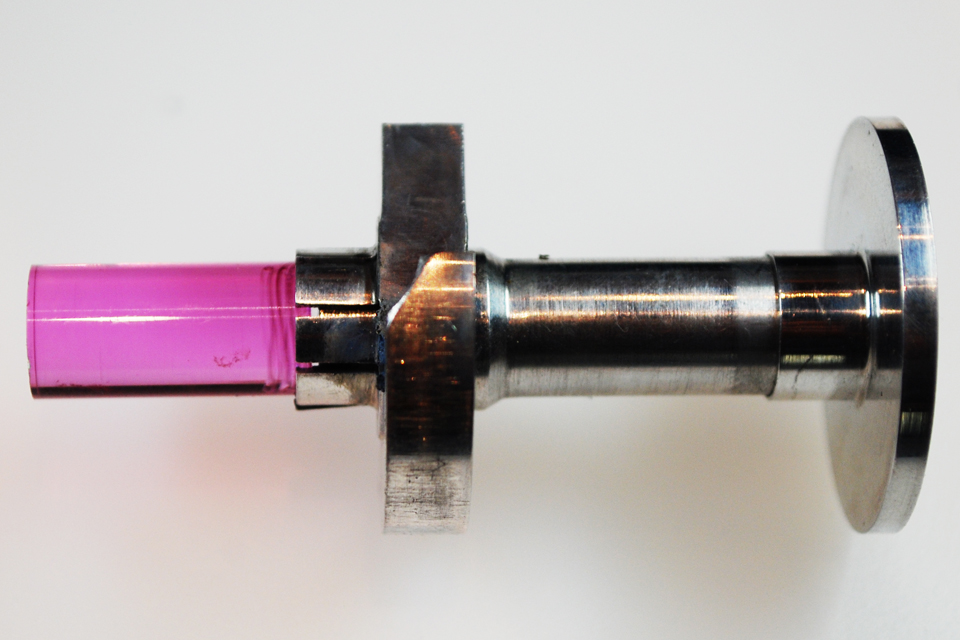
One of Maiman's original synthetic ruby lasers, dimension 9x18mm

By 1962, when Smullin and Fiocco had already bounced the beam from a 50J 0.5 millisecond ruby laser off the moon, and the Soviets too, Maiman had hired 35 people for his APL lab at Quantatron. When its funds dried up because the venture capitalist was taken over, Maiman found an eager partner in Union Carbide with whom to nurse his improved synthetic ruby plant, and in 1962 Maiman founded and became the president of the Korad Corporation, which manufactured high-power ruby lasers. Among other developments while he was at Korad, Maiman supported Robert W. Hellwarth in his Q-switch patent litigation against Gould. After Korad was fully acquired by Union Carbide in 1968, when they exercised the option written into the venture capital contract, Maiman left to found Maiman Associates, a venture capital firm of his own.

Maiman was awarded US Patent Number 3,353,115 for his "Ruby Laser Systems" on November 14, 1967, and paid $300 for it by assignee Hughes Aircraft Company. It turned out to be Hughes' most profitable patent.

In 1971 Maiman founded the Laser Video Corporation, and from 1976 to 1983 he worked as vice president for advanced technology at TRW Electronics (now Northrop Grumman). He later served as consultant to Laser Centers of America, Inc. (now LCA-Vision Inc.) and director of Control Laser Corporation. Maiman continued his involvement in laser developments and applications. In addition to his patent for the first working laser, Maiman authored a number of patents on masers, lasers, laser displays, optical scanning, and modulation.

Prior to his death, Maiman held an adjunct professor position in the School of Engineering Science at Simon Fraser University, where he worked on the development of curricula in biophotonics, photonics and optical engineering.

== Awards and recognition ==
Maiman received numerous prizes, awards, and accolades over the years for his development of the first laser. He was granted membership in both the National Academies of Sciences and Engineering. He was made a Fellow of the American Physical Society, the Optical Society of America (OSA), and the Society of Photo-Optical Instrumentation Engineers (SPIE). In 1962 Maiman was awarded the Franklin Institute's Stuart Ballantine Medal for physics.

In 1966 Maiman received the American Physical Society's Oliver E. Buckley Condensed Matter Prize and the Fannie and John Hertz Foundation Award for distinguished contribution in the field of science, presented in a White House ceremony by President Lyndon B. Johnson.

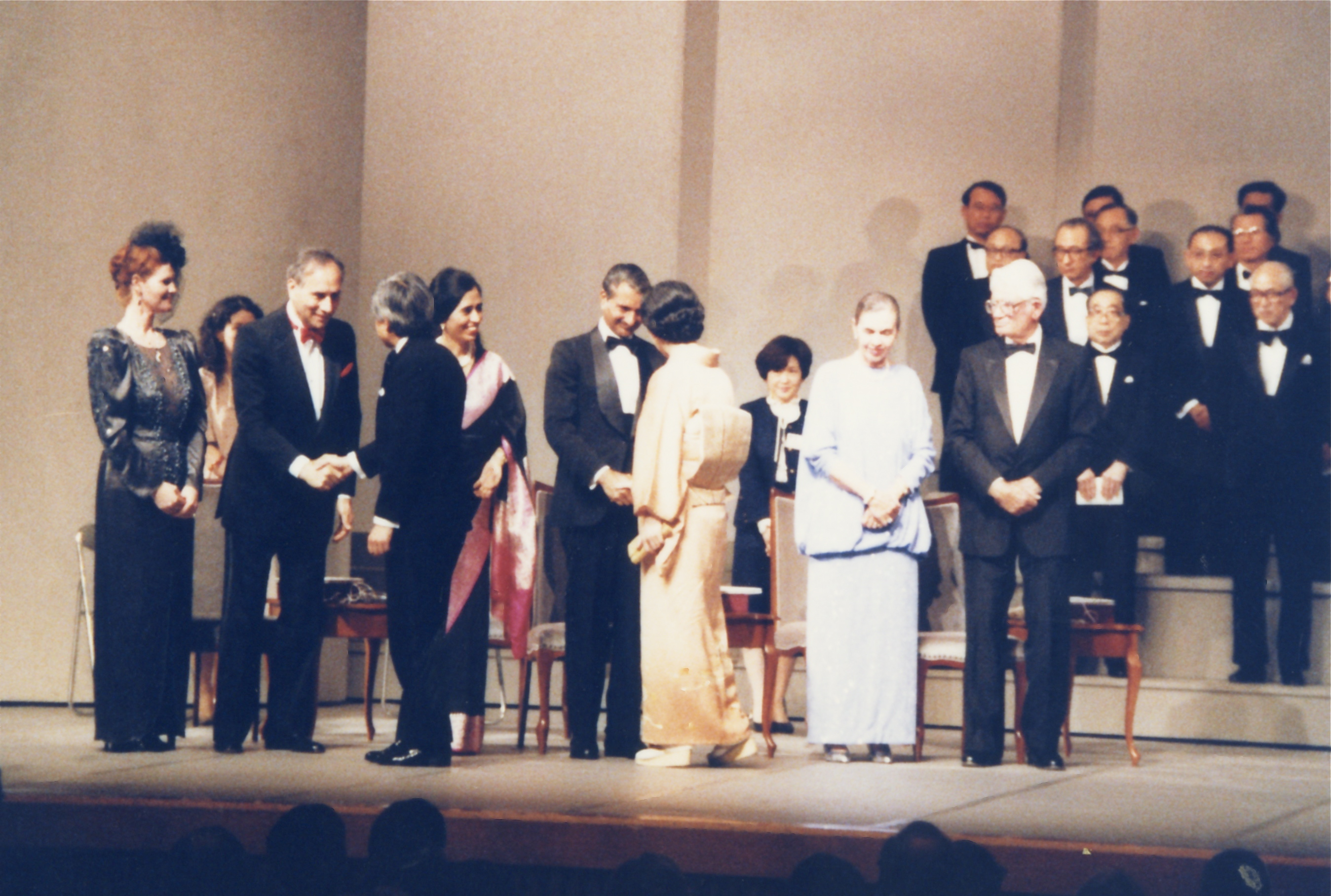
Theodore Maiman at the 1987 Japan Prize award ceremony. Achievement: Realization of the world's first laser.

In 1976, Maiman was awarded the Optical Society of America's R.W. Wood Prize for "Pioneer Development of the First Laser". In 1980, he received the Golden Plate Award of the American Academy of Achievement. He was the recipient of the 1983/84 Wolf Prize in Physics and was also inducted into the National Inventors Hall of Fame that year. In 1987 Maiman was awarded the Japan Prize in Electro-Optics for "realization of the world's first laser."

In 1994, he was inducted as an honorary fellow of the Royal College of Surgeons of England, the only non-physician, non-royal member. Time magazine cited Maiman's invention of the laser as among the twenty most important technological developments of the 20th century. Many universities granted Maiman honorary degrees, with the last from Simon Fraser University in 2002.

Recognition for Maiman and his laser invention continued posthumously. In a 2007 obituary testimonial, maser co-inventor Charles H. Townes described Maiman's 1960 Nature article on his laser as "probably more important per word than any of the papers published by Nature over the past century." The annual Theodore Maiman Student Paper Competition was established in 2008, endowed by major laser groups, and is administered by the OSA Foundation. In 2010 numerous events were staged worldwide by major scientific and industry photonics organizations to celebrate the 50th anniversary of Maiman's first laser and subsequent lasers under the umbrella of LaserFest.

The U.S. Congress passed a resolution celebrating the invention of the laser and citing Maiman. Also in 2010 Maiman's laser achievement was recognized as an IEEE Milestone, and the American Physical Society presented Hughes Research Laboratories with a plaque to commemorate the historic site of the world's first laser.

In 2011, Maiman was recognized by Stanford University as a "Stanford Engineering Hero", citing his "rare blend of advanced training in physics and engineering combined with significant laboratory experience". In 2014, the National Academy of Sciences published a biographical memoir of Maiman including a tribute by Nick Holonyak, Jr.

In 2017 UNESCO declared May 16 the International Day of Light, which is celebrated every year by numerous laser and light-related events around the world. That date commemorates Maiman's first successful firing of his laser.

== Death ==
Maiman died from systemic mastocytosis on May 5, 2007, in Vancouver, British Columbia, Canada, where he lived with his second wife, Kathleen, whom he met on February 13, 1984. He had one daughter, named Sheri, with his first wife, Shirley, whom he married in 1956. Sheri Maiman died of cancer in 1988 at the age of 30.

== See also ==
- Gordon Gould
