= Some Things =

Studio album by Lasgo
- Released: 19 November 2001
- Genre: Trance, pop
- Label: Antler-Subway

Lasgo chronology
Some Things (2001)	Far Away (2005)

Singles from Some Things
- 1. "Something" Released: 15 June 2001; 2. "Alone" Released: 2001; 3. "Pray" Released: 2002

Some Things is the debut album by Belgian trio Lasgo, originally released in Belgium on 19 November 2001 with Antler-Subway record label. The album was also released across the world throughout 2001 and 2002.

At the time of album release, the trio consisted of lead vocalist Evi Goffin (left group in 2008), and record producers Peter Luts and David Vervoort (aka Dave McCullen; former group member).

The debut single, "Something", was released in June 2001, and was proceeded by two more singles from the album, "Alone" and "Pray".

== Track listing ==
No.	Title	Writer(s) / Producer(s)	Length
1	"Intro"	Peter Luts, David Vervoort	1:50
2	"Something"	Peter Luts, David Vervoort	3:42
3	"Blue"	Peter Luts, David Vervoort	4:06
4	"Alone"	Peter Luts, David Vervoort	4:02
5	"Searching"	Peter Luts, David Vervoort	3:42
6	"I Wonder"	Peter Luts, David Vervoort	3:41
7	"Follow You"	Peter Luts, David Vervoort	3:37
8	"Cry"	Peter Luts, David Vervoort	3:54
9	"Pray"	Peter Luts, David Vervoort	3:28
10	"You"	Peter Luts, David Vervoort	4:36
11	"Heaven"	Peter Luts, David Vervoort	3:49
12	"Don't Belong 2 U"	Peter Luts, David Vervoort	4:52
13	"Cloud Surfers"	Peter Luts, Gert Corvers	6:12
14	"Feelings"	Peter Luts, David Vervoort	3:36
15	"Alone (LMC Radio Edit)"	Peter Luts, David Vervoort	3:11

== Charts ==
Chart	Peak position
Belgian Albums (Ultratop Wallonia)	11
Finnish Albums (Suomen virallinen lista)	13
German Albums (Offizielle Top 100)	82
UK Albums (OCC)	30
US Top Dance/Electronic Albums (Billboard)	10
