= Something (Lasgo song) =

2001 single by Lasgo

Single by Lasgo

from the album Some Things
- Released: 15 June 2001
- Length: 3:41
- Label: Antler-Subway
- Songwriters: Peter Luts; David Vervoort
- Producer: Peter Luts

Lasgo singles chronology
"Something" (2001)	"Alone" (2002)

Music video
- "Something" on YouTube

"Something" is a song by Belgian music group Lasgo, released as their debut single. It was first issued on 15 June 2001 as the lead single from their debut album, Some Things (2001), and became a hit, peaking at No. 5 in the Flanders region of the band's native Belgium and entering the top 10 in several European countries. In February 2002, it was released in the United Kingdom, reaching No. 4 on the UK Singles Chart. It also peaked within the top 40 in the United States. In 2013, the song was re-released with new additional vocals from British pop singer Taylor Jones.

== Chart performance ==
In Spain, the single was the best selling vinyl at the distributor the week it was released, reaching number 14 on the country's chart. In October 2001, "Something" peaked at number seven on the Dutch charts, while in Germany it entered the charts at number 11. On 25 February 2002, Positiva Records released "Something" in the United Kingdom. It was also successful there, entering and peaking at number four on the UK Singles Chart. "Something" also peaked at number 19 in Australia. In the United States, the song peaked at 35 on the Billboard Hot 100 and was the only Lasgo song to appear on this chart besides "Alone", which peaked at 83.

== Music video ==
As the song became more popular throughout Europe, the group made a music video, with the on location filmed scenery of the Prague main railway station.

== Track listings ==
Belgian CD single

1. "Something" (radio mix) – 3:41
2. "Something" (extended mix) – 5:56
3. "Something" (Jimmy Goldschmitz Remix) – 6:05
4. "Something" (Peter Luts Remix) – 7:41

European CD single

1. "Something" (radio mix) – 3:41
2. "Something" (Jimmy Goldschmitz Remix) – 6:05

UK CD single

1. "Something" (radio edit) – 3:39
2. "Something" (Flip & Fill Remix) – 6:47
3. "Something" (Mirco de Govia Remix) – 7:33
4. "Something" (video)

UK 12-inch single

A1. "Something" (extended mix) – 5:56
A2. "Something" (Flip & Fill Remix) – 6:35
AA1. "Something" (W.O.S.P. Remix) – 7:27

UK cassette single

1. "Something" (radio edit) – 3:39
2. "Something" (Flip & Fill Remix) – 6:47
3. "Something" (extended mix) – 5:56

US CD single

1. "Something" (radio edit)
2. "Something" (extended mix)
3. "Something" (W.O.S.P. Remix)
4. "Something" (Peter Luts Remix)
5. "Something" (Jimmy Goldschmitz Remix)

Australian and New Zealand CD single

1. "Something" (radio edit)
2. "Something" (extended mix)
3. "Something" (Jimmy Goldschmitz Remix)
4. "Something" (Peter Luts Remix)
5. "Something" (bonus video)

== Charts ==
=== Weekly charts ===
Chart (2001–2003)	Peak position
Australia (ARIA)	19
Australian Dance (ARIA)	2
Austria (Ö3 Austria Top 40)	9
Belgium (Ultratop 50 Flanders)	5
Denmark (Tracklisten)	7
Europe (Eurochart Hot 100)	30
Germany (GfK)	8
Ireland (IRMA)	18
Ireland Dance (IRMA)	2
Netherlands (Dutch Top 40)	7
Netherlands (Single Top 100)	7
Romania (Romanian Top 100)	6
Scottish Singles Sales (Official Charts)	3
Spain (Promusicae)	14
Switzerland (Schweizer Hitparade)	59
UK Singles (Official Charts)	4
UK Dance (Official Charts)	1
UK Indie (Official Charts)	20
US Billboard Hot 100	35
US Dance Club Play (Billboard)	29
US Mainstream Top 40 (Billboard)	21
US Maxi-Singles Sales (Billboard)	5
US Rhythmic Top 40 (Billboard)	34

=== Year-end charts ===
Chart (2001)	Position
Belgium (Ultratop 50 Flanders)	19
Germany (Media Control)	79
Netherlands (Dutch Top 40)	17
Netherlands (Single Top 100)	38

Chart (2002)	Position
Australian Dance (ARIA)	19
Austria (Ö3 Austria Top 40)	68
Brazil (Crowley)	14
Ireland (IRMA)	84
UK Singles (OCC)	26

Chart (2003)	Position
US Mainstream Top 40 (Billboard)	96

== Certifications ==
Region	Certification	Certified units/sales
Belgium (BRMA)	Gold	25,000^{*}
Denmark (IFPI Danmark)	Gold	45,000^{‡}
Germany (BVMI)	Gold	250,000^{^}
United Kingdom (BPI)	Platinum	600,000^{‡}
^{*} Sales figures based on certification alone.^{^} Shipments figures based on certification alone.^{‡} Sales+streaming figures based on certification alone.

== Release history ==
Region	Date	Format(s)	Label(s)	Ref(s).
Belgium	15 June 2001	CD	Antler-Subway	
United Kingdom	25 February 2002	12-inch vinyl; CD; cassette	Positiva	
