= Moerenhout =

Moerenhout is a surname. Notable people with the surname include:

- Daniel Moerenhout (born 1972), Belgian film director
- Joseph Moerenhout (1910–1966), Belgian cyclist
- Koos Moerenhout (born 1973), Dutch cyclist
- Moerenhout Island, outdated name for Maria Est
