= Fiocco (group) =

Belgian Eurodance act

- Origin: Antwerp, Belgium
- Genres: Eurodance, trance
- Years active: 1997–2001
- Label: Antler Subway/EMI (Belgium)
- Members: Jan Vervloet; Enzo Fumarola; Ann Lomans; Anja Maesen

Fiocco was a Belgian Eurodance act by DJ/producer Jan Vervloet. What started as a studio project became the biggest Belgian dance sensation of 1997. In Belgium their success and thereby popularity was comparable with dance acts as Technotronic and 2 Unlimited. Nearly all of their singles and full-album reached the Gold-status in Belgium. Jan Vervloet mostly worked with guest singers for Fiocco. But on stage the act consisted always of Lieve Verbeeck (vocals), Ann Lomans (singer/frontwoman), Anja Maesen (dancer), Jan Vervloet (keyboards/MC/frontman) and Enzo Fumarola (keyboards),

The debut release "Afflitto" became a real club hit which was translated in a No. 1 position for 9 weeks on the Belgian Dance charts. After its tremendous success Jan Vervloet decided to release “Afflitto” on cd-single which reached the top 5 in the Belgian Ultratop.

== European Releases ==
For the second release Fiocco moved to a more commercial sound. With “The Spirit” the dance act was signed in the rest of Europe, including France, The Netherlands, Italy Spain, Scandinavia and Israel. The single became a bigger hit than “Afflitto”. With “The Spirit” they almost topped the Belgian Ultratop, only being stopped by Aqua's “Barbie Girl” at No. 2. By the end of the year the single was the best selling Belgian production in 1997 in the Ultratop. It was the first release with full lyrics (“Afflitto” was more of an instrumental song), who were sung by Absolom singer Pascale Feront.

“Spread The World Around” became the third single in 1998, another top 10 hit, and the album “Free” was also released on Eurodance label Antler Subway. Due to the success of Pascale Feront's project Absolom, Jan Vervloet had to find another singer. Lieve Verbeeck, a singer of The Golden Symphonic Orchestra, was contacted to do the vocals. In the fourth single “Straight Till The End” yet another singer was introduced (Nathalie Van Gronsveld).

In February 1999 Fiocco released the single “Miss You” as Fiocco feat. Medusa. Medusa was a two-times alias by Evi Goffin, known as singer of Lasgo. The song was co-written by Absolom producer Christophe Chantzis. “Miss You” did well on the charts, but wasn't as big as its predecessors. In December 1999 Fiocco released their next single “The Music”, a more trance orientated song with a stirring up melody. As extra, a millennium countdown could be found on the cd-single. Remixes were done by The Oblique and Razzle Dazzle, two well-known underground aliases by Jan Vervloet. The last single charted was “The Crowd Is Moving” in November 2000. It reached to No. 6.

== Fiocco vs Kosmonova ==
After the success of “Afflitto” in 1997, German DJ Michael Nehrig a.k.a. Kosmonova picked up the single in 1998 and reconstructed it for the German market as “Celebrate”. The single was co-produced by Andreas G. Schneider (Dos Or Die Recordings) and Kosmonova. The single entered the Dance charts in Germany, The Netherlands and Belgium. In Belgium “Celebrate” was released as B-side on Fiocco's fourth cd-single “Straight Till The End”. A music video was shot with front lady Ann Lomans lip-syncing the lyrics. Actual signing was done by Jamaican singer Maxine Harvey.

== Fiocco vs Scoop ==
Sometimes the side project Scoop by producer Jan Vervloet is credited as a collaboration with Fiocco. Originally Scoop was a project by Daniel Maze. After its debut release “Wings Of Love” Jan Vervloet joined Scoop. What did not happen with Fiocco, happened with the second single by Scoop: topping the charts in Belgium and The Netherlands in 1999. The release “Drop It” was a No. 1 for several weeks in both countries. “Drop It’s cd-single included a Fiocco remix.

== Split ==
Bit by bit the general interest faded away. Other similar Belgian dance act like Astroline and Absolom were facing the same problem. After the release of “The Music” in December 1999 Fiocco once again became a studio project. Two years later three remixes of Fiocco's biggest hit were released by Jan Vervloet as “Afflitto 2003 (Remixes Part One & Two) ” for the Belgian market. In 2005 those same remixes were released in Spain, together with two songs co-written by Olivier Adams (Praga Khan).

== Discography ==
=== Singles ===
Year	Single	Peak chart positions					Certifications (sales thresholds)	Album
Year	Single	BEL (Vl)	BEL (Wa)	FRA	GER	NED	Certifications (sales thresholds)	Album
1997	"The Spirit"	2	40	75	71	—		Free
1997	"Afflitto"	5	—	—	—	—		Free
1998	"Spread the Word Around"	2	—	—	—	—		Free
1998	"Celebrate" (vs. Kosmonova)	5	—	—	33	23		Free
1999	"Miss You" (featuring Medusa)	14	—	—	—	—		Free
2000	"The Music"	6	—	—	—	—		Singles only
2000	"The Crowd is Moving"	6	—	—	—	—		Singles only
"—" denotes releases that did not chart
