= Annemie Coenen =

Belgian singer, producer and composer

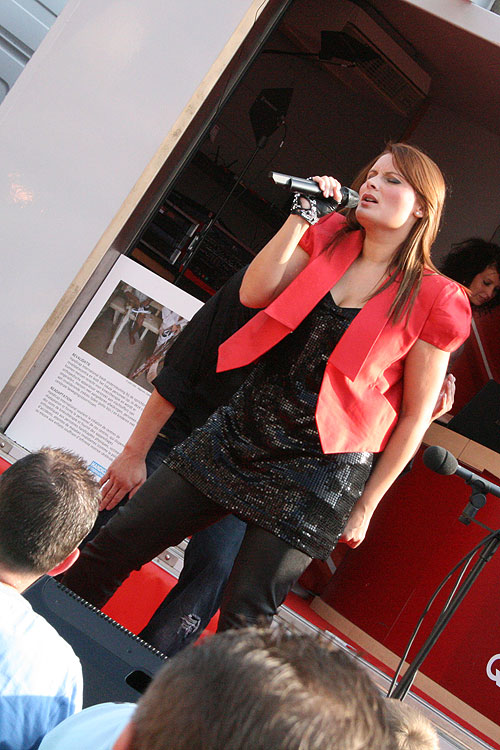
- Born: Annemie Anne Francine Coenen; 14 July 1978 (age 48); Herk-de-Stad, Belgium
- Occupations: Singer, songwriter

Annemie Anne Francine Coenen (born 14 July 1978) is a Belgian singer and songwriter who was in the duo AnnaGrace (formerly known as Ian Van Dahl).

== Life ==
Coenen sang in school musical comedies and choral in Antwerp. She joined a dance band at the age of 17. She hoped to become a fashion designer, and aimed to enter a fashion school at Antwerp. To this end, she worked a variety of odd jobs around Antwerp. One of her friends invited her to Ibiza where she found the dance scene.

When she did return to Belgium, Coenen recorded a demo which she said was mainly "just for fun." However, the demo came to the attention of Stefan Wuyts, representing the A&R label, who was looking for a mime artist for a song called "Castles in the Sky" which was meant to be part of a new Belgian project called Ian Van Dahl. Since her joining the group in 2001, it has sold four million CDs and singles worldwide. She was the main vocalist on the albums Ace and Lost and Found.

In June 2008, Coenen and Luts teamed together to create their own trance music project called AnnaGrace.

Since March 2014, Coenen has had her own fashion line named Gracenatic.

== Discography ==
=== Albums ===
- Ace
- Lost and Found
- (AnnaGrace) Ready to Dare

=== Singles ===
- Ian Van Dahl:
  - 2000 "Castles in the Sky"
  - 2001 "Secret Love"
  - 2001 "Will I?"
  - 2002 "Reason"
  - 2002 "Try"
  - 2003 "I Can't Let You Go"
  - 2004 "Where Are You Now?"
  - 2004 "Believe"
  - 2004 "Inspiration"
  - 2005 "Movin' On"
  - 2006 "Just a Girl"
- AnnaGrace:
  - 2008 "You Make Me Feel"
  - 2009 "Let the Feelings Go"
  - 2009 "Love Keeps Calling"
  - 2010 "Celebration"
  - 2011 "Don't Let Go"
  - 2012 "Ready to Fall in Love"
  - 2012 "Alive"
  - 2013 "Girls Like Dancing"
