= Smile (Lasgo album) =

Studio album by Lasgo
- Released: October 13, 2009
- Genre: Electronic dance music
- Length: 1:04:40
- Label: Sinuz
- Producers: Peter Luts, Jef Martens

Lasgo chronology
Far Away (2005)	Smile (2009)	TBA

Smile (2009) is the third studio album by Belgian trio Lasgo. It features the singles "Out of My Mind", "Gone", "Lost" and "Over You". The album is Jelle Van Dael's first contribution as the vocalist for Lasgo, after singer Evi Goffin was replaced. All songs written and produced by Jef Martens and Peter Luts.

== Track listing ==
No.	Title	Writer(s)	Producer(s)	Length
1.	"Take-Off"	Jef Martens, Peter Luts	Martens, Luts	0:56
2.	"Alone Tonight"	Jef Martens, Peter Luts	Martens, Luts	3:49
3.	"Gone"	Jef Martens, Peter Luts	Martens, Luts	2:58
4.	"Cry 4 You"	Jef Martens, Peter Luts	Martens, Luts	4:09
5.	"Lost"	Jef Martens, Peter Luts	Martens, Luts	2:58
6.	"Over You"	Jef Martens, Peter Luts	Martens, Luts	3:19
7.	"Believe"	Jef Martens, Peter Luts	Martens, Luts	3:19
8.	"Serendipity"	Jef Martens, Peter Luts	Martens, Luts	3:38
9.	"Smile"	Jef Martens, Peter Luts	Martens, Luts	3:55
10.	"Night On Fire"	Jef Martens, Peter Luts	Martens, Luts	3:40
11.	"Out of My Mind"	Jef Martens, Peter Luts	Martens, Luts	2:58
12.	"In My Arms"	Jef Martens, Peter Luts	Martens, Luts	4:27

Limited Bonus Edition
No.	Title	Length
13.	"Out of My Mind (Sebastian Dali Remix)"	6:46
14.	"Gone (Sebastian Dali Remix)"	6:43
15.	"Lost (Jordy Lishious Remix)"	7:38

iTunes Bonus Track
No.	Title	Length
13.	"Gone (Acoustic Version)"	3:30

== Charts ==
Chart	Peak position
Belgian Albums Chart (Flanders)	8
