= You Make Me Feel (AnnaGrace song) =

Single by AnnaGrace

from the album Ready to Dare
- Released: June 23, 2008
- Recorded: 2008; Heliac Studio, Koersel
- Genre: Eurodance, electro house
- Length: 3:06
- Label: Sinuz
- Songwriters: Peter Luts, Annemie Coenen
- Producer: Peter Luts

AnnaGrace singles chronology
"You Make Me Feel" (2008)	"Let the Feelings Go" (2009)

Alternative cover
- U.S. cover

Music video
- "You Make Me Feel" on YouTube

"You Make Me Feel" is the debut single by the Belgian trance project AnnaGrace. It was released in Belgium on June 23, 2008 and then in the United States on August 26. The track reached number one on the U.S. Billboard Hot Dance Airplay chart in its October 25, 2008 issue.

The track was given a digital-only release in the UK at the beginning of 2009 through Hard2Beat Records, which included a new "UK Radio Edit", but it failed to make an impact on the charts.

== Track listing ==
- CD Single (Belgium and United States)
1. "You Make Me Feel" (Radio Edit) – 3:06
2. "You Make Me Feel" (Extended Mix) – 5:07
3. "You Make Me Feel" (Francesco Diaz & Thomas Gold Remix) – 8:20
4. "You Make Me Feel" (VooDoo & Serano Remix) – 5:26
5. "You Make Me Feel" (VooDoo & Serano Club Remix) – 5:26
6. "You Make Me Feel" (John Luniz Remix) – 7:24
7. "You Make Me Feel" (John Luniz Dub Remix) – 7:24
- CD Single (United Kingdom)
1. "You Make Me Feel" (UK Radio Edit) – 2:38
2. "You Make Me Feel" (UK Extended Mix) – 5:41
3. "You Make Me Feel" (Bimbo Jones Remix) – 6:38
4. "You Make Me Feel" (VooDoo & Serano Remix) – 5:26
5. "You Make Me Feel" (Total Control Remix) – 5:12
6. "You Make Me Feel" (John Luniz Remix) – 7:26
- 12" Viynl (Belgium)

A1. "You Make Me Feel" (Extended Mix) – 5:07
A2. "You Make Me Feel" (Francesco Diaz & Thomas Gold Remix) – 8:20
B1. "You Make Me Feel" (John Luniz Dub Remix) – 7:24
B2. "You Make Me Feel" (Voodoo & Serano Club Remix) – 5:26

== Release history ==
Country	Date	Format	Label
Belgium	June 23, 2008	12-inch single	Sinuz
Belgium	June 23, 2008	CD single	PIAS
United States	August 26, 2008	CD single, digital download	Robbins
United Kingdom	April 19, 2009	Digital download	Hard2Beat

== Chart performance ==
Chart	Peak position
Belgian Singles Chart (Flanders)	35
U.S. Billboard Hot Dance Airplay	1
