= Ace (Ian Van Dahl album) =

Studio album by Ian Van Dahl
- Released: 21 May 2002
- Genre: Trance
- Length: 66:47
- Label: Antler-Subway
- Producer: Patrick Renier

Ian Van Dahl chronology
Ace (2002)	Lost & Found (2004)

Alternative cover
- UK and Australian cover

Ace is the debut studio album by Belgian dance music group Ian Van Dahl, released on 21 May 2002 by Antler-Subway Records. The album peaked at No. 7 on the UK Albums Chart, and has been certified Gold by the British Phonographic Industry (BPI). The album title was inspired by taking the first letters of the names of each member of the group: Annemie Coenen, Christophe Chantzis and Erik Vanspauwen.

The album contains four songs that reached the top 20 of the UK Singles Chart: "Will I?" (No. 5), "Reason" (No. 8), "Try" (No. 15) and their highest-charting single, "Castles in the Sky", which reached No. 3 and spent seven weeks in the top 10 in mid-2001. "Castles in the Sky" was a moderate success in Europe, while reaching No. 91 on the US Billboard Hot 100.

== Track listing ==
International edition

1. "Intro" – 2:10
2. "Reason" – 3:21
3. "After All" – 5:56
4. "Satisfy Me" – 6:07
5. "Will I?" (UK Radio Mix) – 2:40
6. "Nights on Java" – 7:37
7. "Try" – 8:12
8. "Lonely" – 4:16
9. "Be Mine" – 3:04
10. "Castles in the Sky" – 3:46
11. "Nothing Left to Say" – 5:17
12. "Tears" – 3:20
13. "{'intəlu:d}" – 0:49
14. "Secret Love" – 3:14
15. "Tomorrow" – 6:03
16. "Run" – 4:41 (UK bonus track)

US edition

1. "Reason" – 3:20
2. "Will I?" (Dee Dee Radio Edit) – 3:46
3. "After All" – 5:53
4. "Satisfy Me" – 6:05
5. "Nights on Java" – 7:34
6. "Try" – 8:10
7. "Lonely" – 4:14
8. "Be Mine" – 3:02
9. "Castles in the Sky" – 3:44
10. "Nothing Left to Say" – 5:15
11. "Tears" – 3:16
12. "{'intəlu:d}" – 0:50
13. "Secret Love" – 3:09
14. "Tomorrow" – 6:00

== Charts ==
=== Weekly charts ===
Weekly chart performance for Ace
Chart (2002)	Peak position
Australian Albums (ARIA)	89
Belgian Albums (Ultratop Flanders)	41
Danish Albums (Hitlisten)	40
European Albums (Music & Media)	27
Finnish Albums (Suomen virallinen lista)	10
Irish Albums (IRMA)	71
Scottish Albums (Official Charts)	4
UK Albums (Official Charts)	7
US Top Dance Albums (Billboard)	16

=== Year-end charts ===
Year-end chart performance for Ace
Chart (2002)	Position
UK Albums (OCC)	152

== Certifications ==
Certifications for Ace
Region	Certification	Certified units/sales
United Kingdom (BPI)	Gold	100,000^{^}
^{^} Shipments figures based on certification alone.
