= The Innocent (1994 film) =

1994 film directed by Mimi Leder

- Genre: Crime; Drama; Thriller
- Written by: David Venable
- Directed by: Mimi Leder
- Starring: Kelsey Grammer; Polly Draper; Jeff Kober
- Theme music composer: Anthony Marinelli
- Country of origin: United States
- Original language: English

Production
- Executive producers: Kelsey Grammer; Bill Todman Jr.
- Producers: Rudy Hornish; Philip L. Parslow; David Venable
- Production location: Queen of Angels Hospital
- Cinematography: Tim Suhrstedt
- Editor: Christopher Nelson
- Running time: 96 minutes
- Production companies: Grammnet Productions; Warner Bros. Television

Original release
- Network: NBC
- Release: September 25, 1994

The Innocent is a 1994 American thriller crime drama made-for-television film directed by Mimi Leder and starring Kelsey Grammer, Polly Draper, and Jeff Kober.

== Plot ==
Lieutenant Frank Barlow (Kelsey Grammer) investigates a robbery that resulted in homicide. The only witness to the crime is a nine-year-old autistic boy named Gregory White (Keegan MacIntosh). When the killers learn of Gregory's existence, they target him, and to protect the child, Barlow takes him to his rural cabin. While there, Barlow, whose own son died a year previously, bonds with Gregory.

== Cast ==
- Kelsey Grammer as Detective Frank Barlow
- Polly Draper as Pamela Sutton
- Jeff Kober as Tinsley
- Gary Werntz as Bates
- Amy Steel as Molly
- Keegan MacIntosh as Gregory White
- Dean Stockwell as Captain Jason Flaboe
- Baron Kelly as Perkins
- Bob McCracken as Elbert
- Ellia English as Reverend Poppy
- Jack Black as Marty Prago
