= Over You (Lasgo song) =

Single by Lasgo

from the album Smile
- Released: November 11, 2009
- Recorded: 2009
- Studio: datboi records
- Venue: 10
- Genre: Eurotrance
- Length: 3:23
- Label: Sinuz
- Songwriters: Jef Martens, Peter Luts
- Producer: Peter Luts

Lasgo singles chronology
"Lost" (2009)	"Over You" (2009)	"Tonight" (2010)

"Over You" is the fourth single released by the Belgian dance group Lasgo, after the addition of Jelle Van Dael as vocals.

== Track listing ==
- CD maxi-single (Belgium and United States)
1. "Over You" (Radio Edit) – 3:23
2. "Over You" (Extended Mix) – 4:51
3. "Over You" (Munkie Boi's Bootie Dub) – 7:40

== Charts ==
Chart	Peak position
Belgian Singles Chart (Flanders)	23
Dutch Singles Chart	24
GFK Dutch Top 100 Singles	76
