= Lost (Lasgo song) =

Single by Lasgo

from the album Smile
- Released: August 2009
- Length: 2:58
- Label: Sinuz
- Songwriter(s): Jef Martens, Peter Luts
- Producer(s): Peter Luts

Lasgo singles chronology
"Gone" (2009)	"Lost" (2009)	"Over You" (2009)

"Lost" is the third single released by the Belgian dance group Lasgo after the addition of Jelle Van Dael as vocalist. The video was shot in Blackpool (UK). It started immediately to climb the national charts.

== Track listing ==
- CD Maxi-Single (Belgium and United States)
1. "Lost" (Radio Edit) – 2:58
2. "Lost" (Extended Mix) – 4:51
3. "Lost" (Jordy Lishious Remix) – 7:40

== Chart performance ==
=== Weekly charts ===
Chart (2009)	Peak position
Belgium (Ultratop 50 Flanders)	4
Belgium (Ultratip Bubbling Under Wallonia)	21
Netherlands (Dutch Top 40)	15
Netherlands (Single Top 100)	38

=== Year-end charts ===
Chart (2009)	Position
Netherlands (Dutch Top 40)	91
