= Cornered! (film) =

2009 film by Daniel Maze

- Film poster
- Directed by: Daniel Maze
- Screenplay by: Darrin Grimwood
- Story by: Daniel Maze
- Produced by: Daniel Maze; Alan Noel Vega
- Starring: Peter Story; Ellia English; James Duval; Elizabeth Nicole; Steve Guttenberg; Eduardo Antonio Garcia
- Cinematography: Keith Dunkerley
- Edited by: Bart Winckers
- Music by: Konstantinos Zacharopoulos
- Production company: Maze Films
- Distributed by: Lightning Media
- Release date: November 22, 2009 (New York City Horror Film Festival)
- Running time: 87 minutes
- Country: United States
- Language: English

Cornered! is a 2009 American slasher film written and directed by Daniel Maze, co-written by Darrin Grimwood, and starring Steve Guttenberg and James Duval. The ensemble cast features Ellia English, Peter Story, Elizabeth Nicole, and Eduardo Antonio Garcia.

== Plot ==
Los Angeles is being terrorized by a masked serial killer whose modus operandi is to break into stores after hours, murder the workers, and take the surveillance tapes so he can use them to relive his crimes. At Steve's liquor store (the main door to which has been boarded up due to an incident with a homeless man) the employees, customers, and a deliveryman named Morty discuss the killer, the $500,000 being offered as a reward for his capture, and how they would kill him, the mentioned methods being eye gouging, exsanguination in plastic wrap, sawing, and decapitation. After the store closes, Steve has a clerk named Donny, and two regulars (a prostitute named Jess, and a phone sex worker named Mona) stay to play cards in the upstairs apartment as a means of keeping Steve's nephew Jimmy (an addict going through drug withdrawal) occupied. Unbeknownst to the quintet, the Convenience Store Killer has chosen them as his next victims, cutting the homeless man (who resides in a nearby alley) in half before sneaking into the building.

When Mona goes downstairs to look for the source of strange noises, the Convenience Store Killer stabs her in the eyes with cornettos, and hides her body in a freezer. Later, Jimmy and Steve are also killed, the former by being stabbed while wrapped in plastic, and the latter by being bisected with the deli's meat saw. Donny and Jess witness Steve's death on a security monitor, and after finding the bodies of Mona and Jimmy, realize the killer is murdering them in the ways they said they would kill him, and that they are trapped in the store without any way to contact help. Forced to try and survive until Morty drops a delivery off at dawn, Jess and Donny find the hidden room where Steve keeps his surveillance equipment, and seal themselves in it.

Morty eventually arrives, and has Jess help him try and seal the killer in the basement, so they can claim the reward money. Donny accidentally rewinds Steve's surveillance gear to the earlier discussion about the killer, which causes him to realize that Morty is the murderer, as he is the only one who could have known about the ways the group had said they would bring down the Convenience Store Killer. Jess is beheaded (the way she said she would dispose of the killer) while trying to escape, and Donny is knocked unconscious. Donny awakens with Morty about to kill him, but realizing that Morty needs the surveillance tapes, Donny taunts him by saying that only he knows where Steve's surveillance equipment is hidden. After Morty has Donny show him where the tapes are, the two get into a fight, which ends with them knocking each other out. Hours later, the authorities arrive, and are shown that Morty had killed Donny by force-feeding him donuts (his favorite food).

At another store, the customers and employees discuss the recent massacre, with the owner saying that it is nothing compared to what he would do to the Convenience Store Killer. Morty appears, and asks, "Oh yeah? What do you have in mind?"

== Cast ==
- Steve Guttenberg as Morty
- James Duval as Jimmy
- Elizabeth Nicole as Jess
- Peter Story as Donny
- Eduardo Antonio Garcia as Steve
- Ellia English as Mona Moore
- David Jean Thomas as Jacko
- David Basila as Teddy
- Rolando Boyce as T.J.

== Reception ==
Jimmy O of Arrow in the Head awarded Cornered! a score of 3 out of 4, commending the visual style and it spending most of its running time focused on atypical characters, though O did admit that the twist was predictable, and that the actions of the characters could induce frustration. An overall grade of 2.5 out of 5 was given by Justin Felix of DVD Talk, who found the plot contrived and the mystery weak, though the murders and quirky characters largely succeeded at making it "a run-around that does entertain" and "a dark yet slightly comic take on the slasher films of yesteryear".

Dread Central gave the film 1.5 out of 5, and wrote that it felt like a padded short, and that it "fancies itself a slasher comedy except as a comedy it's not all that amusing in spite of the best efforts of a game cast, and as a slasher movie there are only two deaths in the first hour and little to get excited, scared, or grossed out by". Steve Porter of DVD Verdict also lambasted Cornered!, stating that it was an "agonizingly slow" film that was full of "moronic horror-film clichés" and no surprises, and ultimately concluding that it was "a complete waste for all but the hardest of hard core slasher fans, who'll probably be disappointed by the relative lack of sickness on display".

=== Awards ===
Cornered! was runner-up for Best Picture at the Rhode Island International Horror Film Festival, and Ellia English won Best Actress at the New York City Horror Film Festival.
