= Will I? =

2001 single by AnnaGrace

Single by Ian Van Dahl

from the album Ace
- Released: 10 December 2001
- Length: 2:38
- Label: Antler-Subway
- Songwriters: Erik Vanspauwen; Christophe Chantzis
- Producers: Erik Vanspauwen; Christophe Chantzis

Ian Van Dahl singles chronology
"Castles in the Sky" (2000)	"Will I?" (2001)	"Reason" (2002)

Music video
- "Will I?" on YouTube

"Will I?" is a song by Belgian music project Ian Van Dahl. The single was released on 10 December 2001 as the second single from their debut album, Ace (2002). It peaked within the top 10 of the charts in the United Kingdom and Denmark. In Australia, the song originally charted at number 70 in February 2002, but when it was re-released as a double A-side with "Reason" later in the year, it peaked at number 29 on the ARIA Singles Chart.

== Track listings ==
Belgian and Dutch CD single

1. "Will I?" (radio edit) – 3:39
2. "Will I?" (Dee Dee radio edit) – 3:50

Dutch maxi-CD single

1. "Will I?" (radio edit) – 3:39
2. "Will I?" (extended mix) – 6:30
3. "Will I?" (Dee Dee extended mix) – 7:31
4. "Will I?" (Peter Luts remix) – 7:59
5. "Will I?" (Pulsedriver remix) – 7:49

Scandinavian CD single

1. "Will I?" (radio edit) – 3:40
2. "Will I?" (extended mix) – 5:09

UK CD and cassette single

1. "Will I?" (radio edit) – 2:38
2. "Will I?" (Hemstock and Jennings remix) – 7:22
3. "Castles in the Sky" (Loverush Ltd. remix) – 8:22

UK 12-inch single

A1. "Will I?" (club mix) – 6:25
B1. "Will I?" (Lange remix) – 7:01
B2. "Castles in the Sky" (Loverush Ltd. remix) – 6:30

US 12-inch single

A1. "Will I?" (extended mix) – 6:25
A2. "Will I?" (Dee Dee remix) – 7:28
B1. "Will I?" (Hemstock and Jennings remix) – 7:24
B2. "Will I?" (Lange remix) – 7:00

Australian CD single

1. "Will I?" (radio edit)
2. "Will I?" (Dee Dee radio edit)
3. "Will I?" (extended mix)
4. "Will I?" (Lange remix)
5. "Will I?" (Peter Luts remix)
6. "Will I?" (Coast to Coast remix)
7. "Will I?" (Pulsedriver remix) – 7:49

Australian CD single ("Reason" / "Will I?")

1. "Reason" (album edit) – 3:21
2. "Will I?" (radio edit) – 3:39
3. "Reason" (extended mix) – 5:51
4. "Will I?" (VooDoo & Serano remix) – 6:24
5. "Reason" (Lange remix) – 5:31

== Charts ==
=== Weekly charts ===
Chart (2001)	Peak position
Australia (ARIA)	70
Australia (ARIA) with "Reason"	29
Austria (Ö3 Austria Top 40)	54
Belgium (Ultratop 50 Flanders)	14
Belgium Dance (Ultratop Flanders)	4
Denmark (Tracklisten)	10
Europe (Eurochart Hot 100)	41
Finland (Suomen virallinen lista)	17
Germany (GfK)	48
Ireland (IRMA)	12
Ireland Dance (IRMA)	1
Netherlands (Single Top 100)	51
Romania (Romanian Top 100)	20
Scottish Singles Sales (Official Charts)	3
Spain (Promusicae)	14
Sweden (Sverigetopplistan)	47
UK Singles (Official Charts)	5
UK Dance (Official Charts)	2
US Dance Club Songs (Billboard)	18
US Dance Singles Sales (Billboard)	4

=== Year-end charts ===
Chart (2001)	Position
UK Singles (OCC)	137

Chart (2002)	Position
UK Singles (OCC)	172
US Maxi-Singles Sales (Billboard)	23
