= International Day of Light =

Annual celebration on 16 May

- Official name: International Day of Light
- Observed by: People worldwide, scientists, educators
- Type: Secular
- Significance: Anniversary of first successful laser operation
- Date: 16 May
- Frequency: Annual
- Started by: UNESCO
- Related to: International Year of Light

The International Day of Light is an annual observance on 16 May organized by UNESCO. Commemorating the anniversary of the first successful laser operation by Theodore Maiman on 16 May 1960, the day aims to celebrate the study of light, build global cooperation and foster international peace and development.

The observance highlights the role of light-based technologies in areas including medicine, communications, energy, agriculture and sustainable development.

== History ==
The International Day of Light was established by UNESCO as a permanent annual observance following the success of the International Year of Light in 2015. The initiative was intended to provide a continuing international platform to highlight the importance of light and light-based technologies in science, education, culture, sustainable development, medicine, communications and energy.

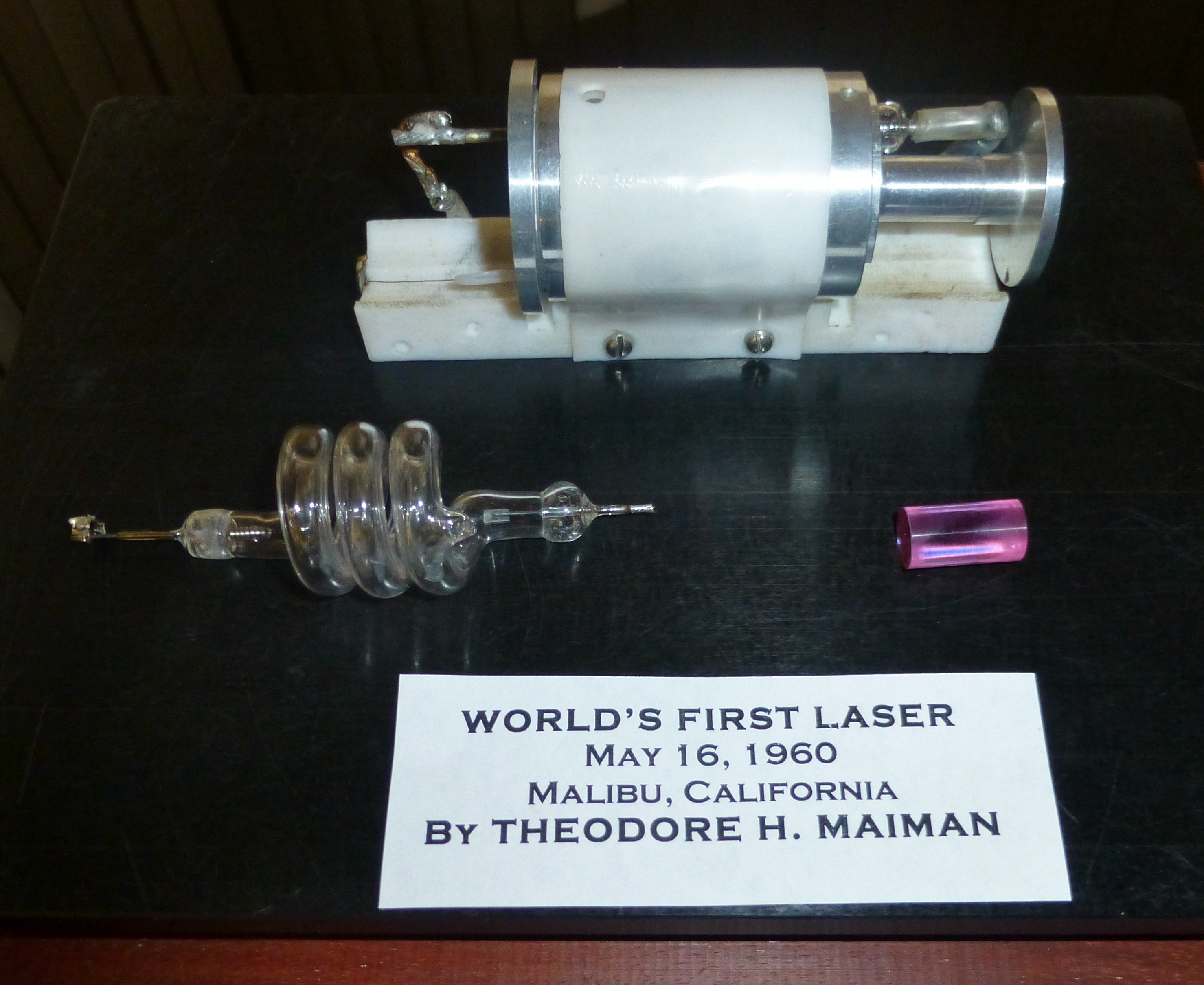
The world's first laser created by Theodore Maiman on 16 May 1960 (pictured 2004).

The date commemorates the first successful operation of the laser by Theodore Maiman on 16 May 1960.

The proposal was introduced to UNESCO by Ghana, Mexico, New Zealand and Russia during the 200th session of the Executive Board. The Executive Board endorsed the proposal and recommended that it be considered by the 39th session of the UNESCO General Conference. In November 2017, the General Conference adopted Resolution 39 C/Resolution 16, officially proclaiming 16 May of each year as the International Day of Light.

According to UNESCO, the observance serves as a long-term legacy of the International Year of Light by promoting international cooperation in science and education and by increasing public awareness of the role of light-based technologies in improving quality of life and supporting the Sustainable Development Goals.

The first celebration happened on 16 May, 2018, with UNESCO organizing the event.

== Purpose ==
The event's primary goals are to improve public knowledge of how light and light-based technologies affect daily life and the growth of society; to emphasize the importance of basic research in the underlying science of light and light-based technologies; to highlight and explain the close connection between light, art, and culture; to build global educational capacity through initiatives aimed at young people, and focusing particularly on poor and emerging countries; and to improve international collaboration between a wide variety of organizations by serving as a primary information resource.

== Global participation ==
The International Day of Light is observed annually through a wide range of activities organised by universities, research institutions, schools, museums, scientific societies, government agencies and non-governmental organisations. Events typically include public lectures, exhibitions, science festivals, educational workshops, laboratory open days and outreach programmes that promote awareness of optics, photonics and light-based technologies.

UNESCO encourages participation from countries around the world through partnerships with scientific organisations, educational institutions and industry. Since its inauguration in 2018, thousands of events have been registered across more than 100 countries, reflecting the global nature of the celebration.

International scientific organisations including the International Commission for Optics (ICO), SPIE, Optica and the International Centre for Theoretical Physics (ICTP) regularly support the observance through educational initiatives, conferences and public engagement activities.

== Global applications of light-based technologies ==
Light-based technologies play an essential role in modern society and have applications across education, healthcare, communications, energy, manufacturing and scientific research. Advances in optics and photonics have enabled developments in imaging, laser technology, fibre-optic communications, precision manufacturing and renewable energy.

=== Education ===
Optical technologies are widely used in education and research. Microscopes, telescopes, projectors, digital displays and laboratory instruments enable scientific observation and interactive learning. Fibre-optic networks also support digital education by providing high-speed internet connectivity for online learning and research collaboration.

=== Medicine ===
Optics and photonics are integral to modern healthcare. Lasers are used in ophthalmology, dermatology, oncology and minimally invasive surgery, while optical imaging technologies such as endoscopy and optical coherence tomography assist in diagnosis and treatment. These technologies have improved the precision of many medical procedures.

=== Communications ===
Optical fibre technology forms the backbone of modern telecommunications infrastructure. Fibre-optic networks enable high-speed transmission of internet, telephone and television services over long distances with low signal loss, supporting global digital communication.

=== Energy ===
Light is fundamental to solar energy generation. Photovoltaic cells convert sunlight directly into electricity, making solar power one of the world's fastest-growing renewable energy sources. Optical technologies are also used in energy monitoring, environmental sensing and climate research.
