= Ian Van Dahl =

Belgian trance group

- Origin: Belgium
- Genres: Vocal trance; Eurodance; house
- Years active: 2000–present
- Labels: A&S Productions
- Members: Christophe Chantzis
- Past members: Erik Vanspauwen; Annemie Coenen; Peter Luts; David Vervoort; Martine Theeuwen

Ian Van Dahl is a Belgian vocal trance and Eurodance music project created by Christophe Chantzis and Erik Vanspauwen, with first singer Martine Theeuwen (aka Marsha), who also co-wrote and sang the song "Castles in the Sky". Cindy Mertens was the second singer and can be seen in the music video for "Castles in the Sky"; her vocal contribution was limited to live performances only. In 2001, she was replaced by Annemie Coenen, who would become front singer of the project.

== History ==
The project's first single was "Castles in the Sky", with lyrics co-written and vocals performed by Martine Theeuwen. The single never became a major hit in Belgium but did very well in the European clubscene. With popularity peaking in party locations like Ibiza where the single got massive support from DJs like Tiësto and Armin van Buuren. This all led to the record being picked up by Dave Pearce, a BBC Radio 1 DJ, and owner of the English dance label Nulife. Many other countries followed and Castles in the Sky got licensed to over 65 countries with labels like Robbins Entertainment in the US and Central Station in Australia.

Thanks to the huge amount of radio airplay and DJ support, Castles in the Sky became a big hit in many countries around the world. Reaching No.3 on the UK Singles Chart while also spending seven weeks in the top 10 in the summer of 2001. The single had also managed to crossover onto the American Charts and reached the Billboard Hot 100 where it peaked at No.91. In 2021, 20 years after the original release, "Castles in the Sky" reached platinum status in the United Kingdom with sales surpassing 600,000 copies.

The follow-up singles, recorded with Annemie Coenen, became major hits on the UK singles charts as well. The single "Will I?" peaked at No.5, "Reason" at No.8 and "Try" at No.15. The Ace album reached No.7 in the UK where it achieved Gold status.

Ace is an acronym for Annemie, Christophe and Erik, the first names of the 3 group members. The single Castles in the Sky was the biggest-selling dance single of the year in the UK. The album Ace became the biggest-selling dance album of the year in the UK. A unique achievement for a Belgian band.

In 2004, recordings of the second album Lost & Found began with Belgian producers Peter Luts and David Vervoort joining Christophe Chantzis and Erik Vanspauwen for the production of this album. The album singles "I Can't Let You Go", "Believe", "Where Are You Now?" and "Inspiration" were all successful, but failed to match the massive commercial sales of the previous singles from the first album. Two final singles, "Movin On" and "Just a Girl", were released in 2005 and 2006.

In 2008 Annemie Coenen decided to leave Ian Van Dahl and start her own solo project, AnnaGrace.

Christophe Chantzis, founder of the group and writer of the hits, is still touring the world performing as a DJ under the Ian Van Dahl banner as of 2025.

== Discography ==
=== Albums ===
List of albums, with selected chart positions
Title	Year	Chart positions						
Title	Year	BEL	AUS	DEN	FIN	IRE	UK	US Dance
Ace	2002	41	89	40	10	71	7	16
Lost & Found	2004	29	—	—	—	—	—	13

=== Singles ===
List of singles, with selected chart positions
Title	Year	Chart positions										Album
Title	Year	BEL	AUS	DEN	FIN	GER	IRE	NLD	SWE	UK	US	Album
"Castles in the Sky"	2000	35	57	18	–	43	13	43	51	3	91	Ace
"Will I?"	2001	14	70	10	17	48	12	51	47	5	–	Ace
"Reason"	2002	31	29	17	–	51	18	75	–	8	–	Ace
"Try"	2002	36	–	18	20	–	42	–	–	15	–	Ace
"Secret Love"	2003	–	–	–	–	–	–	–	–	–	–	Ace
"I Can't Let You Go"	2003	22	–	–	–	72	35	–	–	20	–	Lost and Found
"Where Are You Now?"	2004	23	–	–	–	–	–	–	–	–	–	Lost and Found
"Believe"	2004	–	–	–	–	–	40	–	–	27	–	Lost and Found
"Inspiration"	2005	23	–	11	–	–	–	–	–	87	–	Lost and Found
"Movin' On"	2005	24	–	–	7	–	–	48	–	–	–	Non-album singles
"Just a Girl"	2006	35	–	–	9	–	–	–	–	–	–	Non-album singles
