= AnnaGrace =

2008–2013 Belgian trance group

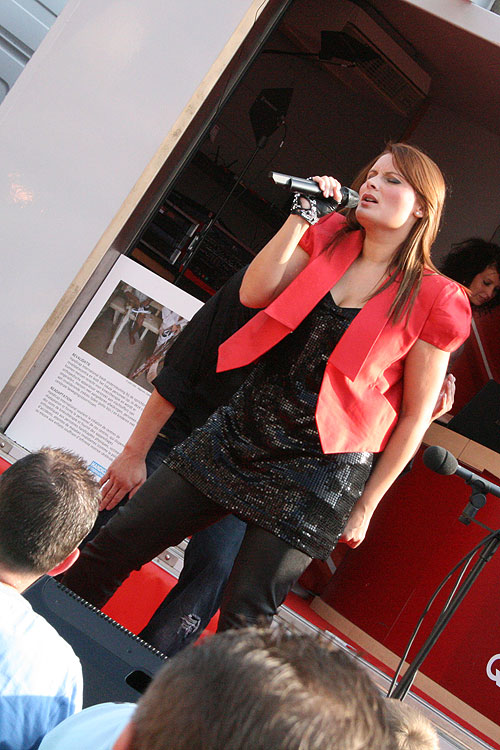
- Annemie Coenen singing for AnnaGrace in Hasselt

Background information
- Origin: Belgium
- Genres: Progressive house; electro house; deep house
- Years active: 2008–2013
- Labels: Sinuz; Kontor
- Members: Annemie Coenen; Peter Luts
- Website: Official website

AnnaGrace was a Belgian progressive house, electro house, and deep house music project fronted by Belgian singer Annemie Coenen and produced by DJ and record producer Peter Luts. The project first achieved success in 2008 with the hit singles "You Make Me Feel", "Let the Feelings Go", "Love Keeps Calling" and the 2010 debut AnnaGrace album Ready to Dare. Today, Coenen continues to tour worldwide.

== History ==
After the breakup of Ian van Dahl, Coenen teamed up with Luts in 2008. The two decided to form their own project called AnnaGrace, they departed from their vocal trance roots of their pasted project, and started to produce progressive house, electro house, and deep house music. In June 2008, the debut AnnaGrace single, "You Make Me Feel", was released in Belgium, shortly followed by a release in the U.S., where it reached No. 1 on the Billboard Hot Dance Airplay. The second AnnaGrace single, "Let the Feelings Go", was released in 2009. The single achieved success on charts in the Netherlands and Belgium while also reaching No. 1 on the Billboard Hot Dance Airplay like its predecessor. "Love Keeps Calling", the third AnnaGrace single, achieved moderate success in Belgium and the Netherlands and peaked at No.47 on the Billboard Hot Dance Airplay chart. The fourth AnnaGrace single, "Celebration", was released in Belgium in May 2010. The debut AnnaGrace album Ready to Dare was released in June 2010 and entered in Belgium charts at No. 39 and peaked at No.15. "Don't Let Go" was the fifth and final album single from the Ready to Dare album, achieving moderate success reaching No.26 on Belgian charts. "Ready to Fall in Love" was released on 27 February 2012. "Alive" was released on 23 July 2012. "Girls Like Dancing" was released on 28 May 2013. All were released domestically in Belgium.

== Discography ==
=== Album ===
Year	Title	Chart positions
Year	Title	BEL
2010	Ready to Dare	15

=== Singles ===
Year	Title	Chart positions			Album
Year	Title	BEL	NLD	US Dance	Album
2008	"You Make Me Feel"	35	—	1	Ready to Dare
2009	"Let the Feelings Go"	5	26	1	Ready to Dare
2009	"Love Keeps Calling"	23	29	1	Ready to Dare
2010	"Celebration"	21	85	—	Ready to Dare
2010	"Don't Let Go"	26	—	—	Ready to Dare
2012	"Ready to Fall in Love"	57	—	—	Non-album singles
2012	"Alive"	136	—	—	Non-album singles
2013	"Girls Like Dancing"	76	—	—	Non-album singles

== See also ==
- Lasgo
- Peter Luts
