= Lost & Found (Ian Van Dahl album) =

Studio album by Ian Van Dahl
- Released: 27 July 2004
- Recorded: 2002–2004
- Genre: Trance
- Length: 71:35
- Label: Antler-Subway
- Producer: Christophe Chantzis; Peter Luts; Erik Vanspauwen; David Vervoort

Ian Van Dahl chronology
Ace (2002)	Lost & Found (2004)

Professional ratings
Review scores
Source	Rating
About.com	3.5/5 stars

Lost & Found is the second and final studio album by Belgian dance music group Ian Van Dahl, released on 27 July 2004 by Antler-Subway Records. It peaked at No. 13 on the US Top Electronic Albums chart. The album includes the singles, "Inspiration", "Believe" and "I Can't Let You Go", which charted in the United Kingdom at No. 87, No. 27 and No. 20 respectively, as well as the single "Where Are You Now?". The album was not released in the UK due to the relatively low charting of its singles.

== Track listing ==
1. "I Can't Let You Go" – 3:47
2. "Inspiration" – 3:35
3. "Where Are You Now?" – 3:33
4. "Crying" – 5:31
5. "Crazy" – 3:47
6. "My Own" – 6:26
7. "Waiting 4 You" – 4:38
8. "Do You Feel the Same" – 4:33
9. "Come 2 Me" – 3:55
10. "Time 2 Go" – 5:52
11. "Rollercoaster" – 6:15
12. "Without You" – 3:40
13. "Believe" – 3:05
14. "Walking Away" – 3:22
15. "To Fall in Love" – 6:04
16. "State of Mind" – 3:32

== Charts ==
Chart performance for Lost & Found
Chart (2004)	Peak position
Belgian Albums (Ultratop Flanders)	29
US Top Dance Albums (Billboard)	13
