= Fiocco =

Fiocco is an Italian surname, and may refer to:

- Pietro Antonio Fiocco, Italian baroque composer
- Giorgio Fiocco, Atmospheric physicist
- Joseph-Hector Fiocco, Belgian baroque composer, Pietro's son
- Jean-Joseph Fiocco, Flemish organist and baroque composer, Pietro's son
- Fiocco (band), a Belgian dance act
