= Daniel Maze =

Belgian film director (born 1972)

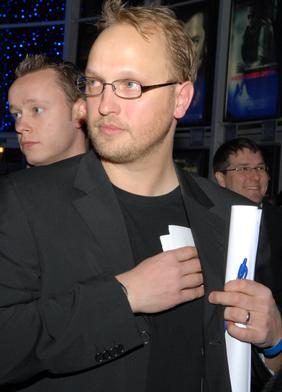
- Daniel Maze at the Kinepolis movie theater in Brussels, Belgium.
- Born: Daniel F. M. H. Maze Moerenhout; 16 June 1972 (age 53); Mortsel, Belgium
- Occupations: film director, producer
- Years active: 1992–present

Daniel Maze (born 16 June 1972 in Mortsel, Antwerp, Belgium as Daniel F. M. H. Maze Moerenhout) is a Belgian media entrepreneur and film producer.

== Biography ==
Daniel Maze made his first film at age 11. He started his professional career as a music producer, whereby he was awarded with gold and platinum records, including Top 10 hits like "Lights from Above" (1997), "Born in the 70s" (1998) and No. 1 hit "Scoop" (1999).

=== Movie career ===
In 2004 he founded MAZEfilms, offering production and post capabilities including sound mixing, DI and CG creation and compositing. He then created MAZEcorp to handle commercial clientele, while MAZEfilms focused on filmmaking. In 2006 MAZEfilms became the first Belgian production company to raise funds from private investors and then shoot a feature-length film in Hollywood, Cornered. It starred Steve Guttenberg and James Duval. In 2012 he founded Greenlight Titles Invest (GLT-INVEST), a company that specializes in film finance. In June 2014 he became president of the AED Film Group located on the studio lot of AED Studios in Antwerp, Belgium. Later AED Film Group was renamed into Dutch Angle.
