= Lasgo =

Belgian electronic music group

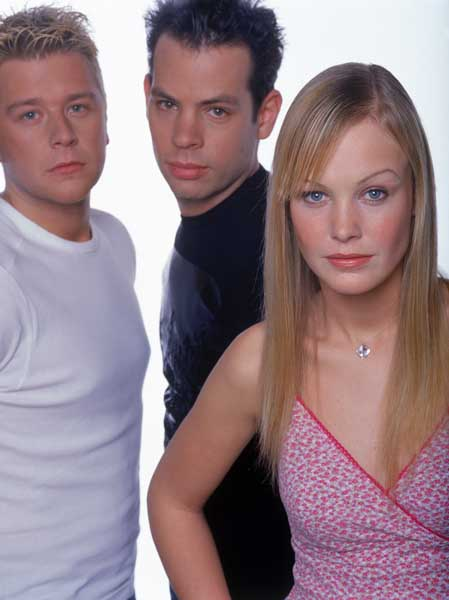
- Lasgo in 2001, from left: David Vervoort, Peter Luts, Evi Goffin

Background information
- Origin: Belgium
- Genres: Trance, EDM
- Years active: 2000–present
- Labels: Positiva; Robbins; EMI; Sinuz; N.E.W.S.
- Members: Peter Luts; Nikki Born; Jef Martens
- Past members: Dave McCullen; Evi Goffin; Jelle Van Dael
- Website: lasgo.be

Lasgo is a Belgian electronic music group. The group formed in 2000 and was composed of Peter Luts, Dave McCullen, and singer Evi Goffin. The group name came from McCullen suggesting something related to the United Kingdom, and creating Lasgo out of Glasgow in Scotland.

Peter Luts confirmed on Belgian radio in 2008 that Goffin was not returning to the group, after choosing to become a full-time mother. Luts announced around the same time that he was looking for a new vocalist for the group. Together with Belgian TV station JIMtv, he organized a televised search (in similar fashion to talent shows like Idol) for a new vocalist, eventually choosing Jelle Van Dael as the singer.

In 2024, Dutch singer Nikki Born joined Lasgo as the lead singer.After that, in 2025, the group continued to release the singles "Ride the Storm" and "Wonderful."

== Career ==
=== 1999–2004: Some Things ===
In October, Lasgo also won the best national single award for Something on the Belgian TMF Awards 2001. Around the same time, Something went gold in Germany with 250,000 copies sold. In November 2001, Lasgo released their second single "Alone". This single was taken from Lasgo's debut album, Some Things, released on 19 November 2001. The music video for "Alone" was shot in a large office in Berlin, Germany.

Luts later remixed Delerium's track "Underwater" for EMI Germany, and also crafted a remix for Aurora's song "The Day It Rained Forever" on Positiva Records (UK). During 2002, Lasgo was nominated for several awards: International Dance Club Hit of the Year (with "Something") and International New Dance Group of the Year at the Danish Dance Awards. In 2002, Lasgo was also nominated for Best Trance Act at the Dancestar World Music Awards. ( The award ultimately was won by Ian Van Dahl's song "Castles in the Sky").

In August 2002, "Alone" was released in the UK and charted there at #7. It peaked at #3 in Belgium, making it their highest peaking song by them on the Belgian Charts. The debut album Some Things was released in the UK at the same time and peaked at #30 in the UK Albums Chart. "Pray" peaked at #17 in December that year. At around the same time, Some Things was released in the United States.

In November 2002, Lasgo won the Smash Hits award for Best Dance Act of the Year 2002 in the UK. December 2002 marked the release of the second version of Some Things in Belgium. The re-release featured three new songs ("Searching", "You" and "I Wonder") along with remixes of their hits.

In 2004 Lasgo won the EBBA Award. Every year the European Border Breakers Awards (EBBA) recognize the success of ten emerging artists or groups who reached audiences outside their own countries with their first internationally released album in the past year.

=== 2004–2008: Far Away ===
"Surrender" is Lasgo's fourth single.

In March 2004, Lasgo won their second award (Best Hi-NRG/Euro track with "Alone") at the Winter Music Conference's International Dance Music Awards in Miami, Florida. The year before they won the Best New Dance Artist Group Award. At the MIDEM 2004 music conference in Cannes (France), Lasgo was one of the winners of the European Border Breakers award. This award, given out by the European Commission, wants to enhance the exchange/export of pop music across country borders.

"Surrender" topped the Billboard Dance Chart in late December 2004 and in January 2005. The second single from Far Away, was called "All Night Long". It was released on vinyl in December 2004. "All Night Long" went #1 in Belgium's dance club chart, and reached the number 8 position in the Ultratop 50. Although it was not as successful as "Surrender," it did manage to chart in the Dutch Top 40 and was their second biggest hit in the Netherlands. "Who's That Girl", the third single from Far Away, was sung by Dave Beyer, not Evi Goffin.

"Lying" was the fourth and last single release from Far Away, although it was not issued in the UK. It reached the Top 20 in Belgium.

=== 2008–2009: Smile ===
"Out of My Mind" is the first single released by Lasgo since Jelle Van Dael joined the group. It was released in 2008, and it peaked at No. 7 on the Belgian singles chart and No. 30 on the Dutch singles chart. It failed to chart in the UK. "Gone" (2009) was the next single with the video shot in Los Angeles. It peaked at #5 Belgium. Then followed "Lost" in August before the album was released the following month. "Over You" became the fourth and final single release from Smile.

=== 2010–2013 ===
"Tonight", the first single from Lasgo's upcoming fourth album, was released to moderate success in the act's homeland of Belgium. This was then followed by the release of "Here with Me" which became a top 30 hit. The third single, "Sky High" was released on 7 May 2012, peaking at #5 on the Ultratip Chart. The fourth single, "Can't Stop", was released internationally on 3 October 2012. It peaked at #18 on the Ultratip Chart as well. Their last single "Feeling Alive," was released on 2 July 2013 and peaked at #21.

In 2023, Jelle Van Dael departed to pursue a solo career.

=== 2024–present ===
In mid-2023, Peter Luts began searching for a new lead vocalist for Lasgo following the departure of Jelle Van Dael, who had announced her solo career. After an intensive search and multiple audition rounds, Dutch vocalist Nikki Born was announced as the new frontwoman on 1 February 2024. Born, who had previously released her own music and appeared on the Dutch television program The Talent Scouts on SBS6, was selected for her versatile voice and dynamic stage presence.

Luts reunited with Belgian producer Jef Martens, professionally known as Basto, to work on new material for the group. At the time of Born's announcement, Lasgo had already confirmed 17 international tour dates, with plans to release new music featuring her vocals. The group released the singles "Ride The Storm" in June 2025 and "Wonderful" in October 2025, marking Born's recorded debut with Lasgo.

== Discography ==
=== Albums ===
Year	Vocalist	Album	BEL	GER	UK	US Dance
2001	Evi Goffin	Some Things	11	82	30	10
2005	Evi Goffin	Far Away	15	–	–	16
2009	Jelle van Dael	Smile	8	–	–	–

=== Singles ===
Year	Vocalist	Single	Peak chart positions										Certifications	Album
Year	Vocalist	Single	AUS	AUT	BEL	FIN	NED	GER	SWI	UK	US	US Dance	Certifications	Album
2001	Evi Goffin	"Something"	19	9	5	—	7	8	59	4	35	29	BPI: Platinum; BVMI: Gold	Some Things
2001	Evi Goffin	"Alone"	43	25	3	—	46	22	89	7	83	—		Some Things
2002	Evi Goffin	"Pray"	71	43	11	—	32	31	—	17	—	—		Some Things
2004	Evi Goffin	"Surrender"	—	—	6	14	—	49	—	24	—	1		Far Away
2005	Evi Goffin	"All Night Long"	—	—	8	—	22	73	—	148	—	—		Far Away
2005	Evi Goffin	"Who's That Girl?" (with Dave Beyer)	—	—	22	—	—	87	—	—	—	—		Far Away
2005	Evi Goffin	"Lying"	—	—	16	5	45	—	—	—	—	—		Far Away
2008	Jelle van Dael	"Out of My Mind"	—	—	7	—	26	—	—	—	—	7		Smile
2009	Jelle van Dael	"Gone"	—	—	5	13	17	—	—	—	—	15		Smile
2009	Jelle van Dael	"Lost"	—	—	4	—	38	—	—	—	—	—		Smile
2009	Jelle van Dael	"Over You"	—	—	23	—	53	—	—	—	—	—		Smile
2010	Jelle van Dael	"Tonight"	—	—	29	—	—	—	—	—	—	—		Non-album singles
2011	Jelle van Dael	"Here With Me"	—	—	30	—	—	—	—	—	—	—		Non-album singles
2012	Jelle van Dael	"Sky High"	—	—	55	—	—	—	—	—	—	—		Non-album singles
2012	Jelle van Dael	"Can't Stop"	—	—	68	—	—	—	—	—	—	—		Non-album singles
2013	Jelle van Dael	"Something 2013"	—	—	58	—	—	—	—	—	—	—		Non-album singles
2013	Jelle van Dael	"Feeling Alive"	—	—	71	—	—	—	—	—	—	—		Non-album singles
2025	Nikki Born	"Ride The Storm"	—	—	—	—	—	—	—	—	—	—		Non-album singles
2025	Nikki Born	"Wonderful"	—	—	—	—	—	—	—	—	—	—		Non-album singles
2026	Nikki Born	"Rise"	—	—	—	—	—	—	—	—	—	—		Non-album singles
