= Dave McCullen =

Belgian musician, music producer (born 1977)

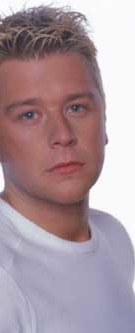
McCullen in 2001

Dave McCullen (born David Vervoort; 28 December 1977 in Bonheiden, Belgium) is a Belgian record producer, DJ, and musician, who was a producer and composer for Ian van Dahl, and a founding member of the group Lasgo, along with producer Peter Luts and vocalist Evi Goffin. McCullen left Lasgo after the release of the 2006 album Some Things, and was replaced by Jef Martens. Peter Luts confirmed on Belgian radio in 2008 that Evi Goffin was not returning to Lasgo, after choosing to become a full-time mother. However Goffin later stated that she did not want to leave Lasgo, but had several conflicts with her management. On April 21 2009, Dave McCullen became Evi Goffin's boyfriend and had kids.

His most famous pieces and remixes include:

- "Cocaine in My Brain"
- "Rave Heaven"
- "B*tch" – a No.54 hit in the UK singles chart in 2005
- "Electric Girl"
- "Stars"
- "Enjoy This Trip" (with Moldenhauer)
- "Upside Down" (with Ashton Coles)
