= Dance Airplay =

US electronic dance music radio chart published by Billboard

Dance Airplay (formerly Hot Dance Airplay and Dance/Mix Show Airplay) is a monitored electronic dance music radio chart that is published weekly by Billboard magazine.

The chart contains 40 positions and ranks the week's most popular songs according radio dance-formatted stations that are electronically and measured by Mediabase and Luminate. The chart came about as a result of the small but influential impact of electronic dance music on the radio in the United States and the stations that program it. Between November 2011 and June 2026, the chart included mix-show plays on top 40 radio and select rhythmic radio.

The inaugural number-one song was "Crazy in Love" by Beyoncé and Jay-Z, which debuted on August 16, 2003, where it spent seven weeks at the top spot. As August 2026, French DJ and musician, David Guetta has collected the most-number one singles on the chart with twenty two chart-toppers. As of the week of October 31, 2026, the current number-one song on the chart is "Caught in the Fire" by GIELLE.

== History ==
Debuting as Hot Dance Radio Airplay in the issue dated October 25, 2003, it initially ranked the 25 most-played songs over eight radio stations playing mainly dance music and monitored by Nielsen BDS. When published for the first time, "Just the Way You Are" by Milky was ranked as the number-one song, but that was following after a ten-week unpublished chart history. "Crazy in Love" by Beyoncé featuring Jay-Z spent the first seven weeks of the chart at number one, which Billboard recognizes retroactively.

With the issue dated November 19, 2011, Billboard changed the name of the chart to Dance/Mix Show Airplay to reflect a change in its methodology. Instead of just ranking the number of airplay songs received at six dance-formatted reporters (four terrestrial radio stations, plus SiriusXM's BPM channel and Music Choice's Dance/Electronica channel), the panel of monitored stations was expanded to include mixshow plays on mainstream top 40 and rhythmic radio during hours in which these stations featured mixshow programming.

On November 26, 2014, the 25-song chart expanded to 40 positions (effective with the December 6, 2014 issue), allowing more dance tracks to chart while simultaneously making the chart less pop-oriented. In comparison to other dance charts, American commercial radio's definition of dance music is arguably more marginal, which is reflected in the chart's content. After the alterations made in 2011, the chart somewhat moved away from its initial purpose of charting conventional dance songs, instead including more remixed pop and urban songs in place of traditional forms of dance music and/or music by dance artists. By 2012, however, the influx of EDM songs in mix shows and the addition of two additional dance outlets amongst those monitored once again increased the dance content found on the chart, thereby decreasing to some extent the number of remixed pop and R&B tracks included.

Beginning with the issue dated July 4, 2026, the chart was renamed back to Dance Airplay. It returned to its original methodology, without mixshow programming, for "a better reflection of core-dance exposure".

== Chart criteria ==
There are 40 positions on this chart and it is solely based on radio airplay. Eight stations (five terrestrial, one cable, one satellite and one online internet service), serve as exclusive reporters and are electronically monitored 24 hours a day, seven days a week by Nielsen Broadcast Data Systems. Songs are ranked by a calculation of the total number of spins per week with its "audience impression", which is based upon exact times of airplay and each station's Nielsen Audio listener data. The chart also includes 84 selected mainstream, adult, and rhythmic top 40 reporters that feature mix shows as part of their programming.

Songs receiving the greatest growth will receive a "bullet", although there are tracks that will also get bullets if the loss in detections does not exceed the percentage of downtime from a monitored station. "Airpower" awards are issued to songs that appear on the top 20 of both the airplay and audience chart for the first time, while the "greatest gainer" award is given to song with the largest increase in detections. A song with six or more spins in its first week is awarded an "airplay add". If a song is tied for the most spins in the same week, the one with the biggest increase that previous week will rank higher, but if both songs show the same number of spins regardless of detection the song that is being played at more stations is ranked higher. Songs that fall below the top 15 and have been on the chart after 26 weeks are removed and go to the 20-song recurrent status.

== Chart statistics and other facts ==
With the exception of Madonna, David Guetta, Kaskade, Calvin Harris, and the Chainsmokers, all of whom crossed over to pop from dance and continue to be core dance artists, the artists in the following lists are pop and/or rhythmic acts; the songs that landed them on the dance chart were generally remixes of the original recordings. Rihanna and Katy Perry, however, have been more successful on both the Dance Club Songs and Dance/Mix Show Airplay charts, where Madonna leads with 50 number ones at the former, seven of those on this chart, followed by Rihanna with 33 (9 on this chart) and Perry with 19 (including 4 on this chart) while achieving success at pop and rhythmic. Guetta is the only male artist to see 8 of his 14 Dance Club Songs number ones also reach number one on Dance/Mix Show Airplay.

=== Artists by longevity/active status ===
As of 2026, fifteen artists can claim to have placed a single on Dance Airplay in the chart's three decades (2000s, 2010s, and 2020s) since its inception:

- Jennifer Lopez, 23 years (2003's "I'm Glad" to 2026's "Save Me Tonight" with David Guetta)
- Madonna, 23 years (2003's "Hollywood" to 2026 with "Danceteria")
- David Guetta, 22 years (2004, with his 2001 single "Just A Little More Love" to 2026's "Sad Girls" with Bebe Rexha)
- Armin van Buuren, 22 years (2004, with his 2003 single "Burned With Desire" featuring Justine Suissa to 2026's "Sun Shines On Me" with Glockenbach)
- Kaskade, 22 years (2004's "Steppin' Out" to 2026's "Vision Blurred" with CID and Anabel Englund)
- Tiësto, 22 years (2004 with "Traffic" to 2026's "Beautiful Places" with Brieanna Grace)
- Kylie Minogue, 21 years (2003, with her 2001 single "Can't Get You Out of My Head" to 2024's "Lights Camera Action")
- Beyoncé, 21 years (2003's "Crazy in Love" featuring Jay-Z to 2024's "Texas Hold 'Em")
- Rihanna, 20 years (2005's "Pon de Replay" to 2025's "Friend of Mine")
- Britney Spears, 19 years (2003's "Me Against the Music" to 2022's "Hold Me Closer" with Elton John)
- Lady Gaga, 18 years (2008's "Just Dance" to 2026's "Runway" with Doechii)
- Calvin Harris, 17 Years (2009's "I'm Not Alone" to 2026's "Satisfy" with Jazzy)
- Kesha, 15 years (2009's "Tik Tok" to 2024's "Joyride")
- Katy Perry, 14 years (2008's "I Kissed a Girl" to 2022's "When I'm Gone" with Alesso)
- Pitbull, 13 years (2009's "I Know You Want Me (Calle Ocho)" to 2022's "I Feel Good" featuring Anthony Watts & DJWS)

=== Artists with the most number-one hits ===
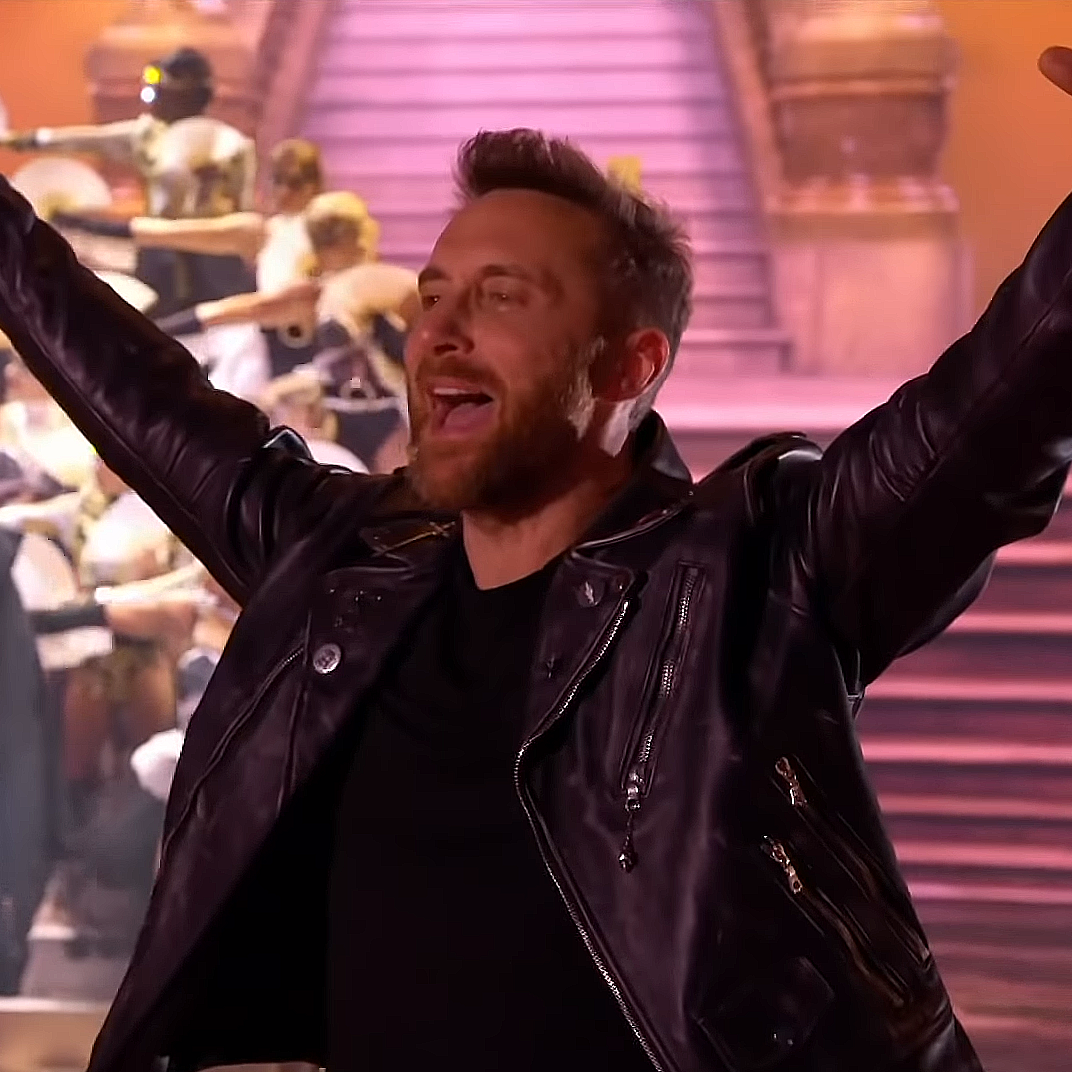
David Guetta has the most chart toppers, with 22 number one hits.

As of 2026, David Guetta has accumulated the most chart toppers, with twenty-two number ones. Rihanna was the youngest artist on this chart to reach number one with "Pon de Replay" in 2005, when she was 16. Madonna is the only artist on this chart to see seven singles all reach number one consecutively, making her the only artist on this chart to accomplish this feat, and also has the most number ones from one album, all four singles from Confessions on a Dance Floor topped the chart (although she is now tied with Katy Perry, as her four singles from Teenage Dream have reached the top spot). In addition, Madonna was also named the number-one Dance Airplay artist for the decade (2003–2009) in Billboard's decade-end recap in 2009. The Chainsmokers have the most number ones among duo or groups with 11, followed by Cascada and AnnaGrace, who are tied with 3. However, AnnaGrace are the only duo or group to score their first consecutive number ones on this chart, while the Chainsmokers claim the most weeks at number one by a duo, with 62.

Number of singles	Artist	Ref.
22	David Guetta	
19	Calvin Harris	
12	Rihanna	
11	The Chainsmokers	
10	Madonna	
9	Ellie Goulding	
8	Illenium	
8	Tiësto	
7	Anabel Englund	
7	Kaskade	

=== Artist with the most weeks at number one ===
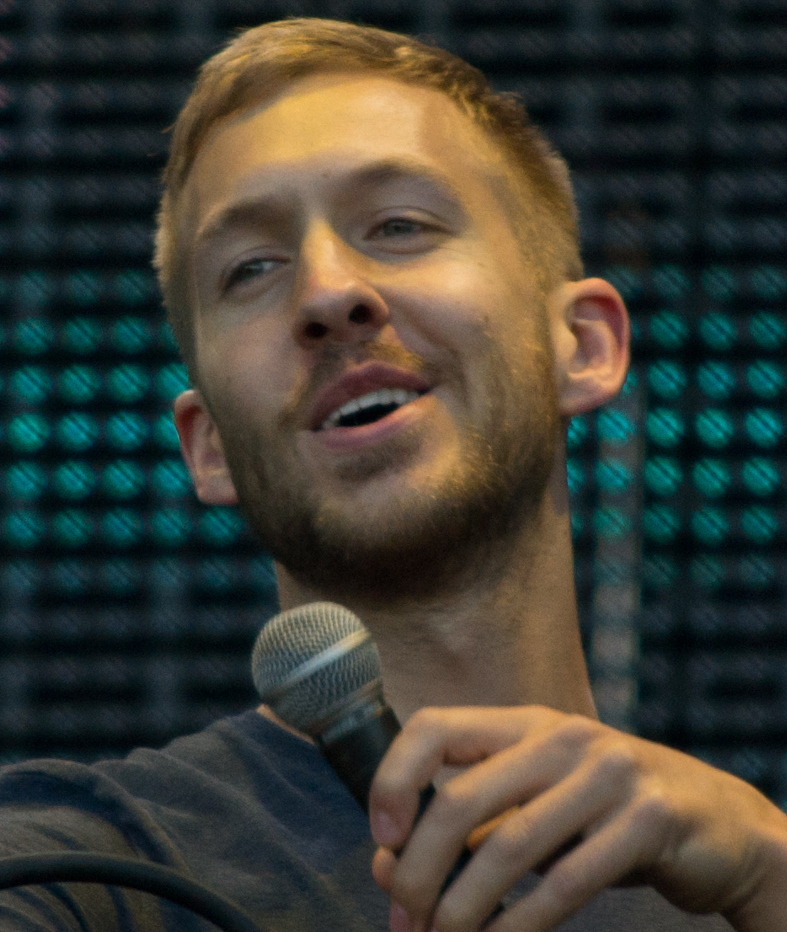
Calvin Harris is the first and only act to have spent over a hundred weeks at number one.

Calvin Harris has spent the most-weeks at number one with a total of 109 weeks. Harris and Rihanna shared fourteen weeks with "We Found Love" and twelve with "This Is What You Came For," but Harris has logged the most weeks atop the chart as his other sixteen singles have spent ten or more weeks at number one.

Number of weeks	Artist	Ref.
109	Calvin Harris	
65	David Guetta	
62	The Chainsmokers	
59	Rihanna	
53	Dua Lipa	
30	Madonna	
27	Ellie Goulding	
26	Halsey	
25	Swedish House Mafia	
23	Marshmello	

=== Artists with the most accumulated top 10 Dance/Mix Show Airplay songs ===
This list features artists who have reached the top ten, even if they didn't reach number one, since the launch of the chart in 2003. As of 2026, David Guetta leads with 50 top ten singles. Guetta, in part due to being a producer and DJ/remixer, has the most charted singles that feature guest vocalists that perform on his songs. Additionally, Rihanna, who now ranks fourth and leads among females, also share two top ten songs together, with "Who's That Chick?", and "Right Now".

Number of singles	Artist	Ref.
50	David Guetta	
29	Calvin Harris	
26	Tiësto	
24	Rihanna	
22	Kaskade	
20	Justin Bieber	
17	Armin van Buuren	
16	Ariana Grande	
16	Katy Perry	
16	The Chainsmokers	
16	Martin Garrix	

=== Artists with the most entries Dance/Mix Show Airplay songs ===
David Guetta leads with the most charted songs overall at Dance/Mix Show Airplay, among artists with 75 titles. Rihanna leads among female act with 37 entries.

Number of singles	Artist	Ref.
75	David Guetta	
45	Tiësto	
40	Kaskade	
39	Calvin Harris	
37	Rihanna	
36	Armin van Buuren	
32	Martin Garrix	
30	Justin Bieber	
28	The Chainsmokers	
25	Ariana Grande	
25	Afrojack	

=== Songs with the most weeks at number one ===
"Closer" by the Chainsmokers featuring Halsey holds the record for the most consecutive weeks at number one, at 20, dethroning the 15-week run of "Poker Face" by Lady Gaga. Before them, singer Deborah Cox held the record for her single "Something Happened on the Way to Heaven" with 10 consecutive weeks between November 2003 and February 2004.

Number of weeks	Artist	Song	Year(s)	Ref.
20	The Chainsmokers featuring Halsey	"Closer"	2016-17	
16	Dua Lipa	"Don't Start Now"	2019-20	
16	Marshmello and Bastille	"Happier"	2018-19	
16	Swedish House Mafia featuring John Martin	"Don't You Worry Child"	2012-13	
15	Lady Gaga	"Poker Face"	2009	
14	Rihanna featuring Calvin Harris	"We Found Love"	2011-12	
14	David Guetta and Bebe Rexha	"I'm Good (Blue)"	2022-23	
14	Elton John featuring Dua Lipa	"Cold Heart"	2021-22	
13	Major Lazer featuring DJ Snake and MØ	"Lean On"	2015	
13	Calvin Harris	"Summer"	2014	

=== Other statistics ===
- David Guetta featuring Akon's "Sexy Chick" was the first number-one single to return to the top spot three times in its chart run in 2009. The record was then broken by "Take Over Control" by Afrojack featuring Eva Simons on January 22, 2011, when that song took the number-one position four times during its run.
- Lady Gaga's first single "Just Dance" holds the record for the longest run on the chart without reaching number one, 44 weeks, as of March 21, 2009. The single peaked at number two in August 2008.
- "Bad Romance" by Lady Gaga endured the biggest drop from number one, when it fell to number 13 in the March 6, 2010 issue. The record was later tied with "Ghosts 'n' Stuff" by Deadmau5 featuring Rob Swire the same year.
- "Only Girl (In the World)" by Rihanna has the biggest drop from the top 10, going from 4 to 21 in the December 25, 2010 issue.
- "Let Me Think About It" by Ida Corr vs. Fedde Le Grand has the longest chart run, spending 52 weeks on the chart, as of November 8, 2008. It also became the first imported single to reach number one, also in 2008. In 2009, the track was named the number one single of the decade in Billboard's decade-end recap of the top 50 Dance Airplay songs from 2003 to 2009.
- As of the May 2, 2009 issue, "Every Word" by Veikka Erkola featuring Daniela spent the longest run of 46 weeks in the top 10 without dropping below number 10.
- Despina Vandi's 2004 hit "Gia" was the chart's first foreign-language recording to reach number one.
- Kelly Osbourne's single "One Word" became the first song to claim the number one spot on the Dance/Mix Show Airplay, Hot Dance Club Play and Hot Dance Single Sales charts in the same week. The feat was accomplished on June 18, 2005.
- In 2007 Eric Prydz vs. Pink Floyd's "Proper Education (The Wall)" became the first number-one single on this chart to feature a remixed recording of an original song, as the track was based on Pink Floyd's "Another Brick in the Wall Part 2."
- Natasja Saad was the first artist to reach the top spot posthumously, as her collaboration with Enur, "Calabria", reached number one on January 22, 2008.
- Filo & Peri featuring Eric Lumiere's "Anthem" was the first trance recording by an American act, to reach the number one position on February 16, 2008.
- Beyoncé, Michelle Williams and Kelly Rowland are the only artists to reach number one as members of a group (Destiny's Child) and as solo artists.
- Kim Sozzi's 2008 number-one single "Feel Your Love" was the first single on the chart to be named the top song of the year before the year had started, as it was named the number one single of 2009. The track reached number one in December 2008 but continued its 45-week chart run in 2009. Because of Billboard's requirements for songs that had charted from December of the previous year to November of the following year, "Feel Your Love" became eligible in this case.
- In 2010, both Inna and Kesha became the first artists on this chart to swap each other's number-one chart positions with debut singles, with Inna's "Hot" succeeding Kesha's "Tik Tok" and then having the latter returned the favor to the former.
- In 2010, Deadmau5 featuring Rob Swire's "Ghosts 'n' Stuff" became the song with the longest climb to number one, 24 weeks. In addition, both "Ghosts 'n' Stuff" and AnnaGrace's "Love Keeps Calling" are the only two songs to have dropped off the chart, then returned and climbed to the top spot.
- In 2010, "Stereo Love" by Edward Maya featuring Vika Jigulina became the first number one song in Billboard's year-end Dance Airplay chart to have reached number one three times in its chart run.
- Kylie Minogue holds the record for having one song re-enter the chart six times with "Get Outta My Way". The single debuted at number 17 in its October 30, 2010 issue, then dropped out a week later, only to return in the November 13, 2010 (two weeks), December 11, 2010 (two weeks), December 25, 2010 (one week), January 15, 2011 (two weeks) and March 19, 2011 (one week) issues.
- "Blame" by Calvin Harris featuring John Newman was the last number-one single during the Dance/Mix Show Airplay's original charted 25 song title position methodology in its November 29, 2014 issue, and the first number-one single under the chart's expansion to 40 positions in its December 6, 2014 issue.
- In 2015, Ellie Goulding became the first artist to replace herself with a new number-one when "Love Me like You Do" dethroned "Outside".
- Also in 2015, DJ Snake became the first artist on this chart to spend 17 consecutive weeks at number one, the first four with his remixed collaboration with AlunaGeorge's "You Know You Like It", the remaining thirteen as a collaborator with Major Lazer and MØ's "Lean On".
- Both Calvin Harris and Zedd are the only artists so far to see their first seven singles reach the top ten consecutively within a three-year period.
- In 2015, The Weeknd became the first artist on this chart to have four singles reach the top 10 within a one-year period: "Love Me Harder" (with Ariana Grande, three weeks at number 1), "Earned It" (number 6), "Can't Feel My Face" (number 2 for five weeks) and "The Hills" (number 9, as of the October 17, 2015 issue).
- Taylor Swift became the first female artist on the chart to have five singles reach the top ten consecutively within a one-year period from one album, all coming from 1989. Her fifth single from the album, "Wildest Dreams", became her first number-one on this chart in the December 5, 2015 issue, making her the first Country artist (and the first artist on this chart to also have reached number one at Country) to achieve this feat.
- Maren Morris became the first active Country artist to reach number one on this chart, as a featured artist with Zedd and the duo Grey on "The Middle", which topped the Chart in its March 3, 2018 issue.
- Adele holds the record for the fastest ascent to number one (four weeks), with "Hello". The single accomplished this feat when it debuted at number 24 in the November 21, 2015 issue, then climbed to number 1 in the December 12, 2015 issue.
- Ariana Grande is the female artist with the most consecutive top ten singles on the chart with 7, while Nicki Minaj is the Rap/Hip-Hop artist with the most songs on this chart, with nine. Both performers achieved that feat in its December 3, 2016 issue when their collaboration "Side to Side" vaulted 15–10 on the chart. Grande would later break that record in 2018 by adding four more singles within that year, bring that total to 11.
- "Eastside" by Benny Blanco, Halsey and Khalid had the longest chart climb to the top 10 with 22 weeks, when the single climbed 15-7 during the February 23, 2019 issue.
- As of the November 2, 2019 issue, "Truth Hurts" by Lizzo holds the longest weeks on this chart for both a rap song and by a solo rap artist recorded by a woman, with 9.
- Jain's "Makeba" became the first Worldbeat song to top the chart on Issue 16 September 2023.
- In 2024, Calvin Harris became the first artist to spend a total of 100 weeks at the top spot.
- In 2025, David Guetta became the first artist to earn 20th career number-one hits, after his song "Gone Gone Gone" topped the chart on the week of December 13, 2025.
- David Guetta also became the first artist in the chart's history to log four number-one leaders in a calendar year, thanks to "Forever Young" with Alphaville and Ava Max, "Beautiful People" with Sia, "A Better World" with Cedric Gervais, and "Gone Gone Gone" with Teddy Swims and Tones and I.

== Radio panel ==
There are 80 reporters who make up the radio panel (as of March 22, 2021), according to Nielsen Broadcast Data Systems, all of them are part of the Top 40 panel:

=== Exclusive Dance Airplay reporters ===
- WCPY (during Dance Factory hours)/Chicago
- KRYC/Yuba City, California
- KMVQ-HD2/San Francisco
- Evolution (WFLZ-HD3/Tampa)/iHeart Media
- Pride Radio (WFLZ-HD2/Tampa)/iHeart Media
- WZFL/Miami
- KNHC/Seattle
- Music Choice Dance/Electronica
- BPM/Sirius XM Radio
- Diplo's Revolution/Sirius XM Radio
- Sirius XM Chill/Sirius XM Radio

== See also ==
- Dance Club Songs
- List of number one dance airplay hits (United States)
- List of artists who reached number one on the U.S. dance airplay chart
