= Peter Luts =

Belgian DJ, record remixer and producer (born 1971)

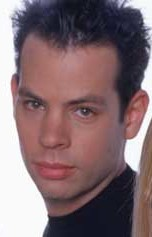
Peter Luts in 2001

Peter Luts (born 14 December 1971 in Heusden-Zolder) is a Belgian DJ, remixer and record producer. He is a member of the vocal trance act Lasgo and the producer behind the group AnnaGrace (formerly known as Ian Van Dahl).

Luts, whose musical career began at age 12, has released various tracks under the aliases Astroline, Abnea, Heliac, Outrowz, Groovewatchers, and others, while working with Lasgo.

He wrote and produced "Love Is the Message", which was the anthem of the 8th edition of the City Parade in 2005.

In 2006, Luts released his first single, "What a Feeling", under his full name alongside his newest project Dominico. The track debuted at number 24 on the Billboard Hot Dance Airplay chart for the week ending 5 August, climbing to number one in its 21 October 2006 issue. For this song, he was awarded at the International Dance Music Awards at WMC (Miami, U.S.) with Best Hi-NRG/Euro track. There he met New York-based house diva Barbara Tucker. By the end of 2007, they released the single "One".

In 2008, Luts associated with house producer Basto and released the single "On My Own". He also released the singles "Can't Fight This Feeling" and "The Rain".
