= White Band Speak with Forked Tongue =

Studio album by Suns of Arqa
- Released: 1989
- Genre: Trance; Reggae
- Length: 60:07
- Label: Bop Cassettes BIP 403
- Producer: Michael Wadada

Suns of Arqa chronology
Seven (1987)	White Band Speak with Forked Tongue (1989)	Jaggernaut (1989)

White Band Speak with Forked Tongue is the sixth studio album by the band Suns of Arqa, recorded with Sprout Head Uprising and released in 1989 by BOP Cassettes. The album was produced by Suns of Arqa founder Michael Wadada. It is a compilation of previous singles, album tracks, new material, cover versions and collaborations. It was released only on cassette in 1989, and many of the tracks were re-issued on the 2018 album Pressure Drop, a tribute to the great Lizard Logan. The style of the album is a radical departure from previous albums, particularly with the more pop-oriented vocals, and the use of Hammond organ, saxophones and trombones.

The album opens with three tracks sung by Helen Watson. The first of these, "Open The Door To Your Heart", was later remixed by Ludo Camberlin for the compilation album Land of a Thousand Churches in the early 1990s. The second, "A Lot of Love" was used on the band's album Seven, as the second part of "Kalilotalove". The third was previously released on Ark of the Arqans.

Side A finished with two backing tracks which the band offered to the public to add their own material to, and then submit for later release.

Side B opened with their 1984/1985 singles "Pressure Drop" and "Champs-Élysées"; contained another version of "Heavenly Bodies" from Ark of the Arqans; and finished up with the Sprout Head Uprising single "Electric Animal" from 1981.

== Track listing ==
=== Side A ===
1. "Open The Door To Your Heart" – 2:53
2. "A Lot Of Love" – 4:17
3. "Heavenly Bodies" – 3:38
4. "Meet De Boys On The Battlefront" – 4:24
5. "No Sad Song" – 2:12
6. "Competition Drum Mix" – 4:14
7. "Competition Bass And Drum Mix" – 5:48

=== Side B ===
1. "Pressure Drop" – 10:13
2. "Champs-Élysées" – 5:23
3. "Conscious Man/Turn Me Loose" – 5:13
4. "Heavenly Bodies (Adrian Sherwood Mix)" – 5:00
5. "Rough Rider" – 3:04
6. "Electric Animal" – 3:48

== Personnel ==
- Kenny Margolis – accordion
- Danny Sheals – drums
- Michael Wadada – guitar, keyboards
- Moot Beret – Hammond organ, saxophone
- Stalwart – saxophone
- Feso Trombone – trombone
