= Seven (Suns of Arqa album) =

Studio album by Suns of Arqa
- Released: 1987
- Genre: Trance; Reggae
- Length: 42:09
- Label: Rocksteady Records ARKA 7
- Producer: Michael Wadada

Suns of Arqa chronology
Ark of the Arqans (1985)	Seven (1987)	White Band Speak With Forked Tongue (1989)

Seven is the fifth studio album by the band Suns of Arqa, released in 1987 by Rocksteady Records. The album was produced by Suns of Arqa founder Michael Wadada.

It was not released on CD until 15 years later (ARKA CD 33125 in 2002), with new artwork and a revised track listing. "Erasmus Meets The Earthling" and "Govinda" were omitted in favour of new tracks "Ishwara" and "Sunarqastra", performed with László Hortobágyi. "Libera Me" was edited and renamed "He Did Not Die" (a title used previously for remixes of this track). The CD also featured "Give Love" from India?, "Ark of the Arqans" from Ark of the Arqans, and a live rendition of "Beyond the Beyond".

The two omitted tracks "Erasmus Meets The Earthling" and "Govinda (I Wait Each Day)", can be found on their compilation album, Land of a Thousand Churches, which was released in the early 1990s.

== Original track listing ==
=== 'Other side' ===
1. "La Pucelle D'Orleans" – 3:06
2. "Kalilotalove" – 4:29
3. "Les Anciens Mystiques" – 2:41
4. "Sisters of Wyrd" – 2:56
5. "Erasmus Meets the Earthling" – 5:49
6. "Govinda (I Wait Each Day to See You)" – 4:00

=== 'Requiem side' ===
1. "Kyrie" – 3:20
2. "Paradisum in Dub" – 3:19
3. "The Truth Lies Therein" – 5:40
4. "Libera Me" – 3:30
5. "In Paradisum" – 3:19

== 2002 reissue track listing ==
1. "Kyrie" – 3:20
2. "Ishwara" – 5:30
3. "The Truth Lies Therein" – 5:40
4. "He Did Not Die" – 2:19
5. "Paradisum in Dub" – 3:19
6. "Sunarqastra" – 4:13
7. "Give Love" – 4:33
8. "La Pucelle D'Orleans" – 3:06
9. "Kalilotalove" – 4:29
10. "Ark of the Arqans" – 4:45
11. "In Paradisum" – 3:19
12. "Les Anciens Mystiques" – 2:41
13. "Sisters of Wyrd" – 2:56
14. "Beyond The Beyond" (Live in London) – 9:49

== Personnel ==
The band on this album were as follows:

- Kendal Ernest (A1, A3-A6, B3), Lizard Logan (A2, A5, B3), Wayne Worm (B1, B2, B4, B5) - bass guitar
- Colin Wood - cello
- Danny Sheals - drums, pennywhistle
- Michael Wadada - guitar, producer
- Cliff Stapleton - hurdy-gurdy
- Steve Hopkins (B4) - keyboards
- Graham "Dids" Dowdall (B2, B5) - percussion
- James Young (B1, B2, B5) - piano, keyboards
- Moot Beret - saxophone, Hammond organ
- Kadir Durvesh - Shenai, Santoor, harmonium, percussion [Naqqara]
- John Perkins (A4, A6), Khalid (A5) - sitar
- Sharda Sahai - tabla
- Marek Miczyk - violin, strings (dombra)
- Daniel Broad (A5, B1, B2, B4, B5), Helen Watson (A1, A2), John Cooper Clarke (B3, B4), Prince Hammer (B4), Sanyogita Kumari (A4, A6), Sarah Wildwitch (A4), Professor Stanley Unwin (A5) - voice
- Denyse Macnamara (A3, B3) - voice, bombarde
