= Mansions of Rastafari =

Various groups of the Rastafari movement

Mansions of Rastafari is an umbrella term for the various groups of the Rastafari movement. Such groups include the Bobo Ashanti, the Nyabinghi, the Twelve Tribes of Israel, and several smaller groups, including African Unity, Covenant Rastafari, Messianic Dreads, SeeGold Empire, and the Selassian Church. The term is taken from the Biblical verse in John 14:2, "In my Father's house are many mansions."

Many individual Rastas are only loosely affiliated with these Mansions, or not at all, in keeping with the principle of freedom of conscience, a general distrust of institutionalism shared by many, and the teachings of Haile Selassie I as Emperor that "faith is private" and a direct relationship requiring no intermediary. Beliefs differ between the mansions, with varying views on the Bible, dreadlocks, diet, and ganja.

== Twelve Tribes of Israel ==
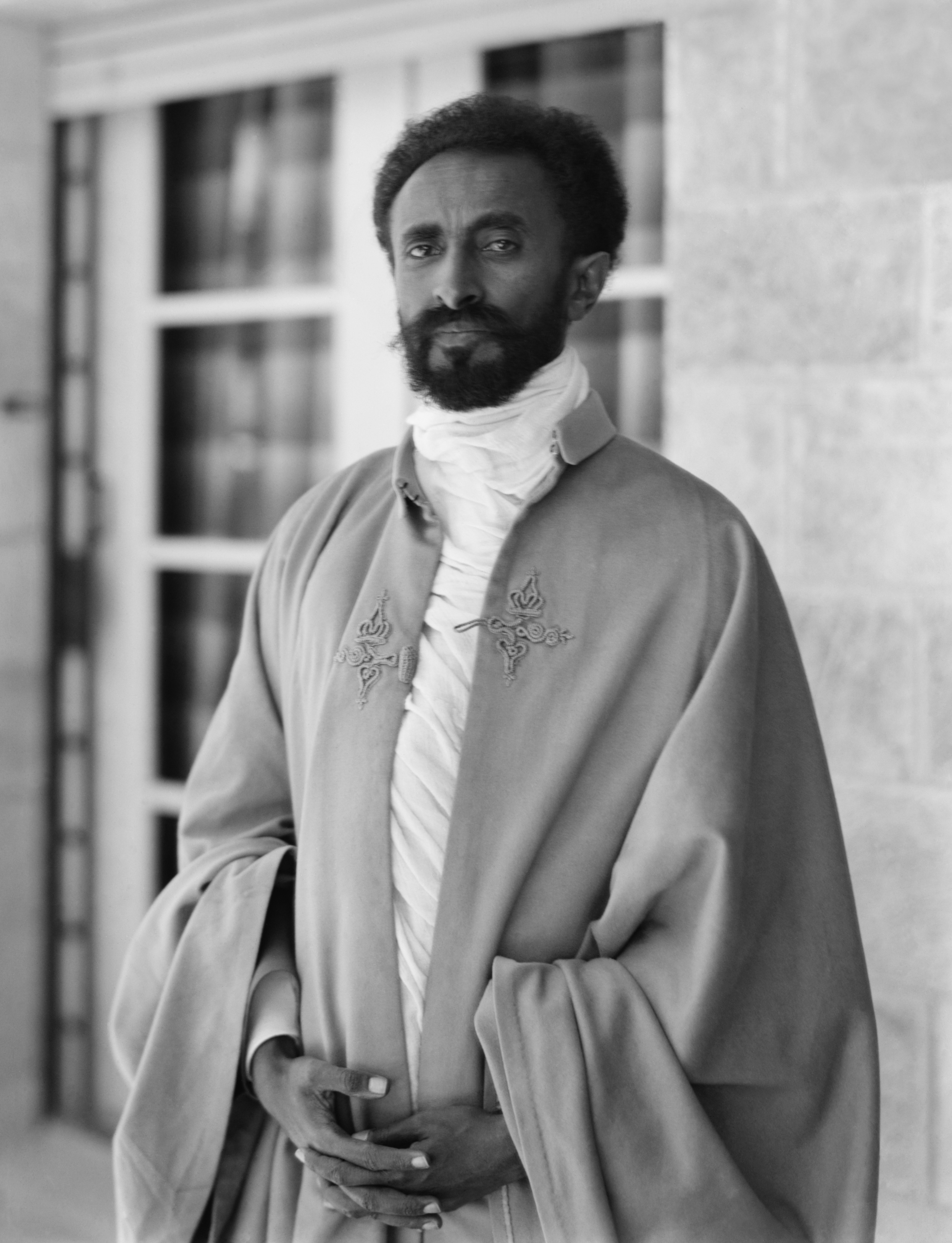
Haile Selassie of Ethiopia

The Twelve Tribes of Israel is a Rastafari group founded in Kingston, Jamaica in 1968, and now functioning worldwide. Its founder, Vernon Carrington, was known as Prophet Gad, and taught his students to read the Bible 'a chapter a day'.

Twelve Tribes of Israel (Ysrayl) Rastafari organization accepts Jesus Christ as Master and Saviour, and Haile Selassie I as Jesus Christ in his Kingly character of the seed of David justified in spirit and manifest in the flesh.

Haile Selassie is seen as a divinely anointed king in the lineage of Kings David and Solomon. While he is viewed as The Messiah Christ in his Kingly Character, Jesus Christ revealed in the personality of H.I.M Emperor Haile Selassie I the 1st, as God of the Bible in flesh represented through his place in the Holy Trinity.

However some view Haile Selassie, Emperor of Ethiopia, as a divinely anointed king in the lineage of Kings David and Solomon (Selassie's house being called the Solomonic dynasty). While he is considered a representation of "The Messiyah in Kingly Character", he is not seen as The Messiyah Himself, but as a representative of the everlasting Davidic covenant, which is to be fulfilled by Yesus Kristos upon his return as The Conquering Lion of the Tribe of Judah (Yahudah). The Twelve Tribes symbology is based on Yahqob's (Jacob) 12 sons, and correspond to the months of the ancient Ysraylite (Israelite) calendar, beginning with April and Reuben. The Most High Jah/Yah/YHWH gave Yahqob a new name which was Ysrayl (Israel). Some people further relate the 12 Tribes to metaphysical signs. Thus Bob Marley came from the Tribe of Yowseph (Joseph), the eleventh of the biblical Ysrayl's (Israel's) twelve children (because he was born in February). The name Levi in Ijahman Levi represents the third child who was born to Yahqob (Jacob). Another well known reggae group of this organization is Israel Vibration.

Bob Marley, by quoting a biblical passage about Yowseph (Joseph) on the album cover of Rastaman Vibration, was acknowledging his own support for this sect. Dennis Brown, Freddie McGregor, Mikey Dread, Luciano and many other roots reggae artists were associated with The Twelve Tribes of Israel (Ysrayl).

Like its precursor Nyahbinghi (see below), Twelve Tribes is very anti-racist and often preaches love toward all people, but still subscribe to black uplift as foretold by Marcus Garvey.

== Nyabinghi ==
The Nyabinghi Order (also known as Haile Selassie I Theocratical Order of the Nyabinghi Reign) is the oldest of all the Rastafari mansions, named after Queen Nyabinghi, a 19th-century Ugandan ruler who fought against the British Empire. It may also be spelled in a variety of other ways, such as "Nyabinghi", "Nyahbinghi", "Niyahbinghi" and so on. It was first used to describe an East African possession cult located in the areas of south Uganda and north Rwanda in 1700 C.E. (Hopkins, p. 259). Early missionaries and anthropologists named the Uganda/Rwanda clans, the Nyabinghi Cult, because their culture was based on the veneration of the goddess spirit, Nyabinghi. The Nyabinghi Cult is said to have thrived due to the possession of the goddess Nyabinghi through dance and religious seances.

Various oral traditions exist that explain how Nyabinghi became a revered goddess. One account states that in 1700 C.E., two tribes inhabited the Uganda/Rwanda area: the Shambo and Bgeishekatwa. Queen Kitami, who is said to have possessed a sacred drum of phenomenal power, ruled the Bgeishekatwa tribe. When Kitami died, she was given immortal status and the name Nyabinghi (Freedman, p. 63). Another tradition states that Queen Nyabinghi ruled the Northwestern Tanzani kingdom of Karagwe and married the chief of Mpororo from the southwestern kingdom of Uganda. Envious of the Queen's power, the ruler ordered her death which is said to have brought "untold horrors to his kingdom" (Kiyaga-Mulindwa, p. 1163). After her death, her spirit continued to be praised and to possess her followers for the next two centuries.

The Bgeishekatwa tribe was eventually defeated by the Shambo clan who adopted the Bgeishekatwa's rituals for Nyabinghi. A century later, the Shambo were defeated by the cultivating Kiga clan (there are legends that the Shambo's defeat is connected to the attempt to kill a woman who was possessed by Nyabinghi) (Freedman, p. 74). Once the Kiga tribe reigned over the land, Nyabinghi became known as a matriarchal power, and the Kiga's century-rule is characterized as the reign of the Nyabinghi priestesses.

Kiga women who received Nyabinghi's blessings and were said to be possessed by Nyabinghi came to be called bagirwa (Hopkins, p. 259). Eventually, the revered bagirwa gained political dominion and became governors of the Kiga people, living a dual life of political and spiritual leadership. The bagirwa, including Muhumusa, remained governors of the Kiga people until 1930 after losing their land to British, German, and Belgian imperialists, which they fought for a period of twenty years. The singular form of the word "bagirwa" is "mugirwa". At some point, men became Nyahbinghi priests as well (Freedman, pp. 80–81).

The Nyabinghi Theocracy Government was named for a legendary Amazon queen of the same name, who was said to have possessed a Ugandan woman named Muhumusa in the 19th century. Muhumusa inspired a movement, rebelling against African colonial authorities. Though she was captured in 1913, alleged possessions by "Nyabinghi" continued, mostly afflicting women.

However, Nyabinghi doesn't have any linkage to or relationship with Ethiopian history or Haile Selassie, it is a part of the Rastafari movement and a manifestation of the wisdom of Jah. Nyabinghi are considered the strictest mansion of the Rastafari movement in Jamaica, preaching the ideals of a global theocracy to be headed by Emperor Haile Selassie I, whom they proclaim to be the promised Messiah and incarnation of Jah, the Supreme.

They have also been known to be very anti-racist. But reflect a deep belief in the uplift of the black race. They also express that oppressors towards anybody will be punished by Jah. People of the Nyabinghi faith often (but not always) affiliate themselves with nonviolence.

=== Nyabinghi music ===
The Nyabinghi resistance inspired a number of Jamaican Rastafari, who incorporated what are known as Nyabinghichants (also binghi) into their celebrations (groundations). The rhythms of these chants were eventually an influence of popular ska, rocksteady and reggae music. Three kinds of drums (called "harps") are used in niyabinghi: bass, also known as the "Pope Basher" or "Vatican Smasher", reflecting a Rasta association between Catholicism and Babylon, the middle-pitched funde and akete. The akete (also known as the "repeater") plays an improvised syncopation, the funde plays a regular one-two beat and the bass drum strikes loudly on the first beat, and softly on the third beat (of four). When groups of players get together, only one akete player may play at any one time. The other drums keep regular rhythms while the akete players solo in the form of a conversation.

Nyabinghi drumming is not exclusive to the Nyabinghi order, and is common to all Rastafari. Its rhythms are the basis of Reggae music, through the influential ska band, the Skatalites. It is said that their drummer revolutionized Jamaican music by combining the various Nyabinghi parts into a 'complete' "drum kit," which combined with jazz to create an entirely new form of music, known as ska. Nyabinghi rhythms were largely a creation of Count Ossie, who incorporated influences from traditional Jamaican Kumina drumming (especially the form of the drums themselves) with songs and rhythms learned from the recordings of Nigerian musician Babatunde Olatunji.

Binghi chanting typically includes recitation of the Psalms, but may also include variations of well-known Christian hymns. Though Count Ossie is clearly the most influential Binghi drummer, practically inventing the genre, the recordings of Ras Michael and the Sons of Negus, as well as the Rastafari Elders, have contributed to the popularity of the music.

Though Nyabinghi music operates as a form of Rasta religious music outside of Reggae, musicians such as Bob Marley and even non-Rastas such Prince Buster (Muslim) and Jimmy Cliff used the idiom in some songs. Recently, dancehall sensation Sizzla, American roots-Reggae artists such as Groundation and hip hop artists have used Nyabinghi drums extensively in their recordings. Though sometimes claimed to be a direct continuation of an African cultural form, Nyabinghi drumming has more often been described as the voice of a people rediscovering their African roots.

Combining Jamaican traditions with newly acquired African ones, Count Ossie and others synthesized his country's African traditions and reinvigorated them with the influences of Nigerian master-drummer Babatunde Olatunji, as a comparison of Count Ossie's Tales of Mozambique and Olatunji's earlier Drums of Passion will reveal. Indeed, it is that combination of inherited traditions and conscious rediscovery of lost African traditions that makes Nyabinghi drumming—and Rasta—so powerful.

== Bobo Ashanti ==
The Bobo Ashanti (or Bobo Shanti) group was founded by Emanuel Charles Edwards in Jamaica in 1958 (prior to Jamaica's independence in 1962). The name combines 'Bobo', meaning wrap (referring to their turbans) a reduplication of the twi verb Abo meaning to wrap, and 'Ashanti', the name of a tribe from Ghana of which many of the slaves that were taken from Africa to Jamaica were members. The Bobo Ashanti advocate repatriation of all black people to Africa, and that black people should be reimbursed monetarily for slavery (reparations). The Bobo Ashanti use Revelations 5 to justify their belief Emmanuel is the reincarnation of Christ, the reincarnate Black Christ in a priestly state. By most members of the Bobo Ashanti, he was called "Prince Emmanuel Charles Edwards, without Mother or Father, a Priest of Melchezidek, the Black Christ in the Flesh." Emmanuel is also called "Dada" by his followers, who see him as part of a holy Trinity in which Haile Selassie of Ethiopia is King/God (Jah), Marcus Garvey is prophet, and Emmanuel is high priest after the priesthood order of Melchizedek. Almost all sacred songs and tributes to their ancient trinity of prophet, priest, and king ends with the phrase "Holy Emmanuel I Selassie I Jah Rastafari".

The Bobo Ashanti are a self-sufficient group whose members grow their own produce. They also live separately from society and the other Rastafari orders in their current base in the Nine Miles area of Bull Bay, Jamaica. They function similarly to the Accompong Maroons and even though it is not official, like an independent nation within Jamaica with their own constitution. They do not accept the values and lifestyle of the wider Jamaican society. The members of the Bobo Ashanti "house", sometimes called Bobo Dreads, dress very differently from all the other orders, wearing long robes and very tightly wrapped turbans. The Bobo Ashanti lifestyle closely emulates that of the Old Testament Mosaic Law, including hygiene laws for menstruating women, and the observation of the Sabbath from sundown on Friday to sundown on Saturday (when no work is allowed). The consumption of salt and oil is avoided. Members of the order do not smoke marijuana in public, as it is only reserved for worship among members.

Bobos greet each other using the formal address "Blessed Love My Lord and Empress". They are notable for wearing turbans and long flowing robes, as well as brooms they carry with them, which signify cleanliness. These brooms and other crafts such as straw hats are also sold in Kingston as a way to provide funds for the community. The Bobos have established a strong relationship with the local community outside of Bobo Hill and often invite people to their services. Membership of the Ethiopia Africa Black International Congress is increasingly growing globally, as their members are seen in Africa, Europe, North and South America and throughout the Caribbean. A turban is not always a sign of a Bobo; there has also been a noted trend among some Rastafari outside of the Bobo Order in the wearing of turbans, as evident amongst some reggae artists. Nevertheless, these Rastas are often mistaken for Bobos in Jamaica. Among Bobo Dreads, it is readily accepted that being a member of the Priesthood Order requires more than simply the covering of ones head.

Bobos say that "Africa" is the name that the European colonizers gave to Ethiopia, or "Jerusalem". As to the faith, and in the Bobo (and Rastafari) conception, the true Ethiopian Israelites are black men and women, who are Royal Ethiopians from creation birth, scattered during the African diaspora. Bobos believe that black skin, skin blessed by the sun, is original, and they consider black women as mothers of creation. Women cover their legs, arms, and head in practice of the Queen Omega principles. Nearly all the men within the community are seen as prophets or priests, whose functions are to "reason" and conduct religious and parliamentary services, respectively.

Several musicians are members of Bobo Ashanti, including The Abyssinians, Anthony B, Capleton, Sizzla Kalonji, Fantan Mojah, Jah Mason, Junior Kelly, Lutan Fyah, Ras Shiloh, Pressure, and Junior Reid.
