= Nyabinghi (disambiguation) =

Nyabinghi can refer to:

- One of the Mansions of Rastafari, see Nyabinghi
- Nyabinghi rhythm
- Niyabinghi chants
- Nyabinghi drums
