= Wadada Magic =

Studio album by Suns of Arqa
- Released: 1983
- Recorded: Tracks 5 and 9 in Cargo Studios, Rochdale. Tracks 1–4 and 6–8 in Strawberry Studios in Stockport.
- Genre: Electronic, Reggae
- Length: 41:43
- Label: Antler Records ANTLER024
- Producer: Michael Wadada

Suns of Arqa chronology
Musical Revue (1983)	Wadada Magic (1983)	India? (1984)

Wadada Magic is the second studio album by the band Suns of Arqa, recorded and released in 1983 by Antler Records. The album was produced by Suns of Arqa founder Michael Wadada.

The spine of the LP reads "Suns of Arqa Vol III Wadada Magic". The style on this album is quite different from their debut album Revenge of the Mozabites, and the tracks are more dance-oriented. Some of the tracks from this album (A1-A3, B1, B2, B4) were made available on CD in 1992 on the compilation Arqaology, released on Arka Sound.

On Arqaology, tracks A1, A2 here are combined as one, as are tracks B1, B2. Track B3 appears on Arqaology in truncated form (just 22 seconds!), however, it appears in full on their later album Magiczna Miłość.

The sleevenotes for this LP includes a dedication to Alice and Harry Ward, presumably relatives of Michael Ward (Wadada).

== Track listing ==
=== Side A ===
1. "Brujo Magic" – 2:29
2. "Magic Version" – 3:50
3. "Hasheesh" – 4:26
4. "City of Nine Gates" – 5:27
5. "The Lesson" – 3:47

=== Side B ===
1. "Steppin' To The Music" – 6:21
2. "A Lesson in Trancedance" – 8:11
3. "The Step" – 4:09
4. "The Heat" – 3:03

== Personnel ==
Founder Michael Wadada performs on this album with koto, piano, acoustic guitar, temple blocks, percussion and vocals. The band also comprises Pulse & Chris Joyce on drums, Spliff on bass, Aziz Zeria on harmonium, swar mandal and vocals, Kalu & Papu Zeria on tablas, Big Red on fiddle, banjo and mandolin, Helen Watson on vocals, Mustaphafakir on dilruba, electric Spanish and Hawaiian guitars, marimba, Jew's harp and vocals.

Guest musicians appearing on the album are Prince Far-I on vocals (Tracks A2 and A4), Prince Hammer on vocals (Track B4), Keith 'Lizard' Logan on bass (Track A4), John Scott on Chinese Shawm (Tracks A3 and B2), Amar Singh on sitar and tanpura (Track A5), RM on sitar (Track A4), The Legendary Leperds as 'rthydin section' (Track B4), John 'JJ' Slater on percussion (Track A3) and Steve Cyclepath (credited as 'Magician and Guru') !
