= Musical Revue =

Live album by Suns of Arqa
- Released: 1988
- Recorded: December 7, 1982
- Venue: Band on the Wall, Manchester, England
- Genre: Reggae
- Length: 49:50
- Label: ROIR Europe A-161
- Producer: Phil Rainford

Suns of Arqa chronology
Revenge of the Mozabites (1980)	Musical Revue (1988)	Wadada Magic (1983)

Musical Revue is a live album featuring Prince Far I and Suns of Arqa released on ROIR Europe in 1988. The album was produced by Phil Rainford and features a live recording of Prince Far I with Suns of Arqa at Band on the Wall in Manchester on 7 December 1982.

The sound is fairly rough with Suns of Arqa low in the mix and Prince Far I a little too close. There is much dub mixing, delays, reverbs, and repeats flying left and right, and the music appears improvised in places. The music here is more complex than reggae, sometimes moving towards variations on jazz/highlife (e.g. "Brujo Magic").

This album captured Prince Far I's last concert. He was murdered in Kingston, Jamaica in 1983.

== Track listing ==
1. "Steppin' To The Music" – 1:33
2. "Throw Away Your Guns" – 10:15
3. "Brujo Magic" – 6:15
4. "Version Galore" – 5:36
5. "83 Struggle" – 7:48
6. "Trancedance Music" – 4:34
7. "Foggy Road" – 4:56
8. "What You Gonna Do On The Judgement Day" – 8:53

== Personnel ==
- Prince Far I - vocals
- Helen Watson - vocals
- Marcel King - lead vocals on "Version Galore", backing vocals
- Snuff - drums
- Dan Sheals - drums
- Spliff - bass
- Wayne "Worm" Sedgman - bass
- Michael Wadada - rhythm guitar
- Mustaphafakir - lead guitar
- Anton Behrendt - keyboards
- Tony Trundle - fiddle
- Marek Miczyk - violin
- Brian Jones - saxophone
- Prince Hammer - MC
- Keshav Sathe - tabla
