= Ras Michael =

- Born: Michael George Henry; 1943 (age 82–83); St. Mary, Jamaica
- Genres: Reggae
- Instruments: Vocals; repeater
- Labels: Trojan; Dynamic Sounds; ROIR; VP

Michael George Henry OD (born 1943), better known as Ras Michael, is a Jamaican reggae singer and Nyabinghi specialist. He also performs under the name of Dadawah.

== Biography ==
Henry was born in Saint Mary Parish, Jamaica, where he was raised in a Rastafari community. As a teenager he moved to Kingston's Waterhouse district where he played with local Rastafari musicians. He set up the Zion Disc label in the mid-1960s, and also worked at Coxsone Dodd's Studio One as a session musician and released a number of singles. He was the first member of the Rastafari movement to have a reggae radio program in Jamaica (The Lion of Judah Time program first aired in 1967 on the JBC). His band is called The Sons of Negus and are known for their traditional Nyabinghi drumming and chanting.

Tommy Cowan saw Ras Michael's group in 1974, and released an album of their music later that year as Nyahbinghi. The album did not sell well, so Cowan produced a second album, Rastafari (1975), with the group augmented by top studio musicians, including bassist Robbie Shakespeare, guitarist Earl "Chinna" Smith, keyboard player Robbie Lyn, and additional guitar from Peter Tosh; Rastafari, which featured a painting of a young Haile Selassie by Neville Garrick on the cover, was more commercially successful, and was followed in 1977 by Kibir Am Lak, which increased the popularity of the group in Europe and the United States.

Ras Michael contributed to recording sessions at Lee "Scratch" Perry's Black Ark studio (including sessions with Bob Marley), and he performed with Marley at the One Love Peace Concert in Jamaica in 1978. With the Sons of Negus he recorded an album (Love Thy Neighbor) with Perry at the Black Ark. He recorded "Give Love" with Suns of Arqa in 1984 for their album India? In all, he has recorded over 25 albums.

In addition to acting as an evangelist, ambassador and diplomat for the Ethiopian Orthodox Tawahido Church internationally, Ras Michael is one of the founders and president of the Rastafarian International/Marcus Garvey Culture Center in Los Angeles, and the Fly Away Culture Center in Kingston, Jamaica. Currently he lives in Los Angeles.

In August 2015 it was announced that he would be awarded the Order of Distinction by the Jamaican government in recognition of his contribution to the development of the country's music.

== Discography ==
- Nyahbinghi (1974), Starapple/Trojan
- Dadawah – Peace & Love (1974), Wildflower
- Freedom Sounds (1974), Dynamic Sounds
- Rastafari (1975), Grounation
- Tribute to the Emperor (1976), Trojan
- Irations of Ras Michael & Sons of Negus Volume One (1977), Top Ranking
- Kibir Am Lak (1977), Top Ranking
- Movements (1978), Dynamic Sounds
- Love Thy Neighbour (1979), Jah Life
- Promised Land Sounds (1980), Lion's Gate
- Disarmament (1981), Trojan
- Revelation (1982), Trojan
- Rally Round (1985), Shanachie
- Zion Train (1988), SST
- Know Now (1989), Shanachie
- Rastafari Dub (1989), ROIR
- Mediator (1992), High Times
- Spiritual Roots (1999), VP
- Lion Country (1999), Roots & Culture
- A Weh Dem a Go Do Wid It (2003), ROIR
- Try Love (2006), Vista Ave Entertainment
- Live Ina Babylon (2009), Sankofa
- None A Jah Jah Children (2018), VP
- Live by the Spirit (2020), Hen House Studios
- Jah Love (2022), Zion Disc

Compilations

- New Name (1994), Culture Press
- Anthology (2001), Culture Press
- Merry Peasant (2003), 2b1
- Reggae Best (2004), Culture Press
- Reggae Masters (2009), Creon
