= Prince Hammer =

Jamaican reggae musician

- Born: Berris Simpson; Kingston, Jamaica
- Genres: Reggae, MC DJ Toaster, Roots Reggae, Dancehall, Dub
- Years active: Mid 1970s–present
- Labels: Front Line, Hitrun, KSJ, Berris, Tamoki-Wambesi, Dove, Joe Gibbs, Soul Beat

Berris Simpson, better known as Prince Hammer, is a Jamaican reggae deejay, singer, and record producer.

== Biography ==
Simpson was born at the Jubilee Hospital in Kingston and grew up in a Christian family in Kingston.

After deejaying on the Vee-Jay sound system in the early 1970s, Simpson initially recorded under his own name (as 'Berris Simpson') in the mid-1970s with producer 'God Son' Glen Brown for whom he recorded "Whole Lot of Sugar" ( also versioned by Sylford Walker as "My Father's Homeland" on the "Lambsbread" album ) and "Tel Aviv Rock", before adopting the 'Prince Hammer' name when he began producing his own recordings on labels that he owned such as Gold Cup and Belva, sold through his own record shop on Orange Street. He released several singles in the late 1970s for a variety of producers. He made a cameo appearance in the film Rockers, and found a wider audience via his Blacka Morwell-produced 1978 album Bible, released on Virgin Records' Front Line label. Notably, the title track of the album features Hammer's version of Cornell Campbell's Jah Me No Born Yah vocal chant, lyrically inspired by King James Bible-translated King David Psalm 19. His 45 release, Ten Thousand Lions attracted significant interest in England amongst the followers of the Lloyd Coxsone and Jah Shaka sound systems.

His album for the UK based Front Line (record label) was followed by the work Roots and Roots, released on Adrian Sherwood's Hitrun Roots Reggae, vocal and dub and Discomix label in 1979. In a departure from earlier releases, the album Roots and Roots is not entirely a DJ toasting work—a number of the tracks, such as Righteous Man, also showcase Prince Hammer as a singer and vocalist in a conscious Roots Reggae style. The album features Prince Hammer's version of Prince Far I and Augustus Pablo's Let Jah Arise, the original of which was re-released on Steve Barrow's Blood and Fire (record label).

Hammer toured the UK with Carlton Bubbler's Ogilvie and Crucial Tony Phillips' Creation Rebel, Bim Sherman, Congo Ashanti Roy aka Roydel Johnson, Johnny Clarke's brother, Eric 'Fish' Clarke and Prince Far I in 1979, and later with punk rock bands such as The Clash and The Slits, as well as with avant garde musician Don Cherry (trumpeter).

A second album for Hit Run, Dancehall Style, was released in 1981, and they worked again on his 1985 album Vengeance, versioning tunes that had already appeared on Singers & Players' Staggering Heights album, New Age Steppers Foundation Steppers album, and on Bim Sherman's Can't Stop Dancing Discomix and Across the Red Sea album. Prince Hammer also versions Stranger Cole and Gladstone Anderson's Just Like a River hit on Vengeance, as well as his take on Big Youth's Prince Tony-Barrington Spence based Some Like it Hot. There is also a version of The Revolutionaries' Kunta Kinte Dubplate. He appeared on the track "The Heat" on Suns of Arqa's 1983 fusion dance album Wadada Magic, also featuring on their live album with Prince Far I entitled Musical Revue which was recorded in 1982, and he provides vocals on "Libera Me" on their 1987 album Seven. He also worked with Tamoki-Wambesi and Dove labels' founder, Roy Cousins on the Respect I Man album (1989).

Hammer also worked as a producer, releasing Rod Taylor's conscious Roots Reggae If Jah Should Come Now album on Keith Stone's Daddy Kool label out of the UK. Other artists that he produced included Echo Minott, Jennifer Lara ( who had gained success under the tutelage of Coxsone Dodd at Studio One), Toyan, Trinity, Enos McLeod and George Nooks aka Prince Mohammed. Several of these productions were compiled on the Africa Iron Gate Showcase album, released on his own Berris label in 1982, backed by Noel Simms aka 'Zoot' Sims, Style Scott, Uziah Thompson, Winston Wright, Ansel Collins, The Roots Radics, 'Horsemouth' Leroy Wallace and engineered by King Tubbys, Joe Gibbs (producer), as well as by Joseph Hoo Kim at his Channel One Studios.

== Discography ==
=== Albums ===
- Bible (1978), Front Line
- Roots Me Roots (1979), Hitrun/Miss Pat Walker
- Roots Me Roots (1980), Little Luke
- World War Dub Part 1 (1980), Baby Mother/Hitrun
- Dancehall Style (1981), Hitrun
- Vengeance (1985), Melinda
- Respect I Man (1989), Tamoki Wambesi
- Back For More (2005), KSJ Productions

Compilations

- Rastafari Bible 1976–1982 (2000), Patate
- Prince Hammer Presents: Shake Up The Dance (2023), Tamoki Wambesi Dove
