= The Man from Delmonte =

English indie pop band from Manchester, England

- Origin: Manchester, England
- Genre: Indie pop
- Years active: 1986–1990; 2025–
- Labels: Ugly Man; Bop Cassettes; Vinyl Japan
- Past members: Mike West; Sheila Seal; Martin Vincent; Howard Goody
- Website: www.themanfromdelmonte.com

The Man from Delmonte are an English indie pop band from Manchester. Formed in 1986, the band is a four-piece and consists of Mike West (vocals and acoustic guitar), Sheila Seal (bass), Martin Vincent (guitar and harmonica), and Howard Goody (drums).

They took their name from a series of 1980s television advertisements for Del Monte fruit juices, featuring the "man from Del Monte". In these, the man would visit villages to sample their fruit juices, to see if they were good enough to be included in his company's drinks. The tagline, shouted jubilantly by a villager on approval was, "The man from Del Monte, he say 'Yes!'".

== History ==
The band members had little in common with most Manchester bands. Goody was a graduate of Winchester School of Art; Vincent had been an art critic and painter; Seal, a Glaswegian, was a classically trained musician who had run an art gallery, and West, who wrote the songs, was the Australian-born son of the author Morris West.

The band played many gigs at the Boardwalk club, in Manchester, where they recorded their Big Noise live album in 1989.

At one point they were managed by Welsh journalist and filmmaker Jon Ronson.

After they split up in 1990, some members continued as Surfurbia, while West moved to New Orleans to pursue a solo career and later formed the duo Truckstop Honeymoon with his wife, Katie.

In 2024, radio presenter Iain Lee, who was a fan of The Man from Delmonte, reached out to each member of the band to enquire about a potential reunion, and they agreed. "[Lee] connected with a couple of my kids, who are in a band called The Mudd Club - great punk rock band. They found some old stuff by us. There wasn't anything online except a couple of songs," West told the Manchester Evening News. "They knew nothing about the band - they sort of came across it. And they said, 'Dad, what's this band that you were in back in the 80s?' They had no idea about this indie band from 1980s Manchester. They found the Facebook fan page that had about 200 people on it and they started asking people if they had any of these records. But they didn't tell anyone that I was their dad, and then Iain said he'd send them these records. My son Julian then admitted who he was and Iain asked him if he thought we would get back together. Then, Iain reached out to each member and they all agreed. So I said, 'why not?'."

They played their first gigs as a reformed band in February and April 2025. They also released their first album since 1989, Better Things, as well as a single, "Believe Me", which was pulled from old demos and live tapes.

== Discography ==
Chart placings shown are from the UK Indie Chart.

=== Singles ===
- "Drive, Drive, Drive" (Ugly Man, 1987)
- "Water in My Eyes" (Ugly Man, 1987)
- "Will Nobody Save Louise" (Ugly Man, 1988) (#13)
- Monday Morning After EP (Bop Cassettes, 1989)
- "Big Noise" (Bop Cassettes, 1989) (#20)
- "My Love Is Like A Gift You Can't Return" (Bop Cassettes, 1989) (#13)
- "Believe Me" (self-released, 2025)

=== Albums ===
- Catholic Boys on Mobilettes (Bop Cassettes, 1989) – compilation
- Big Noise (Bop Cassettes, 1989)
  - Big Noise (Vinyl Japan, 2000) – reissue
- The Good Things in Life (Vinyl Japan, 1999) – compilation
- Better Things (2025)
