= Boardwalk (music club) =

Nightclub in Manchester, England

The Boardwalk
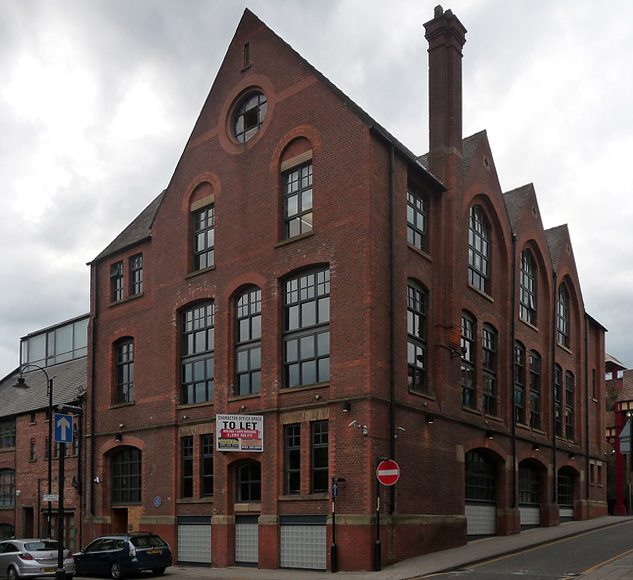
- The building in 2013
- Interactive map of The Boardwalk
- Address: Little Peter Street; Manchester; England
- Coordinates: 53.47371°N 2.25050247°W
- Events: Music; Concerts
- Current use: Office Space

Construction
- Opened: 15 December 1985
- Closed: 1999

The Boardwalk was a nightclub in Manchester, England, which was open from 1986 to 1999. This medium-sized club, owned by David, Colin and Donald Sinclair, was a popular live music venue and nightclub in the late 1980s and early 1990s. It had multiple floors, with a rehearsal space in the basement.

Colin Sinclair and his father bought the Boardwalk building, located on Little Peter Street, in 1985. Originally a school operated by St. Peter's church, the building's top floor had been used as a rehearsal space for the Hallé Orchestra under John Barbirolli, and, from the 1970s, as a home for an alternative theatre company, the Green Room (which later moved to Whitworth St West) . The first band to rehearse there was John Robb’s band The Membranes and the first live event at the Boardwalk took place 15 December 1985, although at the time the venue had no alcohol licence.

Along with other clubs like the Haçienda, and the International, the Boardwalk provided an important live venue for many bands, from local to national. Sue Langford organised in-house bookings at the Boardwalk, with various independent promoters also hosting shows at the venue (including Simon Moran). Bands such as Oasis and Northside made their live debuts at the Boardwalk. The Man From Delmonte, the Charlatans, Happy Mondays, Female Brothers and Dub Sex, were amongst the many Manchester bands that appeared frequently at the Boardwalk before acquiring international recognition or disappearing into obscurity. The venue also saw a variety of other acts including The Stone Roses, Hole, Sonic Youth, Chumbawamba, Jayne County, Verve, Bob Mould and Rage Against the Machine. The venue was also known as a focus of Britain's C86 music scene.

The basement of the venue served as a rehearsal space. The Membranes, James, Simply Red, and A Certain Ratio were among the acts who took rehearsal space at the Boardwalk in the 1980s. In the early 1990s, Oasis shared a rehearsal room with Sister Lovers.

The venue added a mezzanine floor in December 1990 marking a shift to club nights every Saturday. 'Freedom' took place every Saturday from December 1990 until June 1996, featuring former Haçienda DJ Dave Haslam alongside guest DJs including Erick Morillo, Pete Heller, Nick Warren and Pete Tong. From March 1992 until March 1999 a second club night, 'Yellow' was staged every Friday at the Boardwalk. Funkademia was started by DJ and promoter David Payne at The Boardwalk in 1995 and has since gone on to become one of Manchester's longest running club nights.

The nightclub site now has a blue plaque, featuring a smiley face, a symbol associated with acid house. Beneath the symbol is a description of The Boardwalk as a "Madchester Venue Nightclub and Rehearsal Rooms".
