= Notes on Desire =

Notes On Desire

Studio album by Helen Watson
- Released: 1995
- Recorded: 1995
- Genre: Folk
- Label: Building Records (cat BUILDCD001)
- Producer: Martin McGroarty; Helen Watson

Helen Watson chronology
Companion Gal (1992)	Notes On Desire (1995)	Somersault (1997)

Notes On Desire is the fourth album by Helen Watson, released in 1997. The album was recorded at Cavalier Studios in Stockport and Out of the Blues Studios in Manchester.

Self-financed, the album saw Watson return to her folk roots after the glossy sheen of the EMI and RCA years.

== The Helen Watson Band ==
- Helen Watson - vocals
- Martin McGroarty - guitars
- Bo - bass and vocals
- Snuff - drums and percussion

== Guest musicians ==
- Eryl Roberts - percussion
- Jake Newman - double bass
- Chris Nelson - saxophones
- Dave Baldwin - keyboards
- Luke Smith - keyboards

== Track listing ==
1. "Shiver" (Watson, McGroarty)
2. "Isn't That What It's For" (Watson, McGroarty)
3. "Since I Fell for You" (Bud Johnson)
4. "Time of Your Life" (Watson, McGroarty)
5. "Notes On Desire (At Its Height)" (Watson, McGroarty)
6. "Blame It On the Sun" (Syreeta Wright, Stevie Wonder)
7. "Magnificent" (Watson, McGroarty)
8. "From the Top" (Watson, McGroarty)
9. "I Told You I Love You - Now Get Out" (Frigo, Ellis, Carter)
10. "Conversation" (Watson, McGroarty)
11. "Let Me Be the First to Tell You" (Watson, McGroarty)
12. "The Last Thing I Need" (Watson, McGroarty)
13. "Jackie You're Moody" (Watson, McGroarty, Trundle)
14. "I Want More" (Billie Holiday)
15. "Fell for It" (Watson, McGroarty)
