= India? =

Studio album by Suns of Arqa
- Released: 1984
- Recorded: Ashton-under-Lyne; Greater Manchester; England
- Genre: Trance; Bhaṅgṛā
- Length: 52:02
- Label: Rocksteady Records 1 GIL
- Producer: Michael Wadada (billed as Wadada Elder Arqan)

Suns of Arqa chronology
Wadada Magic (1983)	India? (1984)	Ark of the Arqans (1985)

India? is the third studio album by the band Suns of Arqa, recorded and released in 1984 by Rocksteady Records. The album was produced by Suns of Arqa founder Michael Wadada. The spine reads "Suns of Arqa Vol IV - Such big ears, but still you can't see".

India? is a radical departure from the style of the previous two albums Revenge of the Mozabites and Wadada Magic. As the title suggests, this album has a strong Indian feel to its arrangements and instrumentation. It has not been released on CD, however three of the five tracks have found their way onto other Suns of Arqa CD releases.

Track A1 'Give Love' which features Ras Michael appears on the 1991 compilation CD Land of a Thousand Churches, and tracks A3/B2 (Kalashree/Vairabi) both appear on the 1992 CD Kokoromochi.

The sleevenotes for this LP include thank-yous to Adrian Sherwood, Style Scott, Gadgi, Martin Hannett, Chris Nagle and Kevin Metcalf.

== Track listing ==
=== Dancer Side ===
1. "Give Love" – 4:32
2. "S7" – 4:16
3. "Kalashree" – 17:38

=== Yantra Side ===
1. "Asirus" – 4:17
2. "Vairabi" – 21:19

== Personnel ==
Founder Michael Wadada performs on this album with sajoe, guitar, drums and vocals. The band also comprises Aziz Zeria on tanpura, Kalu Zeria on tabla, Helen Watson and Madastra on vocals, Doctor Himadri Chaudhuri on violin, mandolin and harp, Keith 'Lizard' Logan and Moot Beret on bass, Eric Random on shakers (on location in India), OB Glen and OB Gray on keyboards.
