= The Weather Inside =

Studio album by Helen Watson
- Released: 1989
- Recorded: 1988
- Genre: Pop
- Label: EMI/Columbia
- Producer: Glyn Johns

Helen Watson chronology
Blue Slipper (1987)	The Weather Inside (1989)	Companion Gal (1992)

The Weather Inside is the second album by Helen Watson released in 1989. Produced by Glyn Johns, the record was recorded at A&M Studios in Los Angeles and AIR Studios in London. All songs were written by Helen Watson and Martin McGroarty, except "Dangerous Daybreak" (Stead / Ellis / Trundle / Watson / McGroarty).

The album employs a stellar cast of session musicians including Andy Fairweather-Low, Richie Hayward, George Hawkins, Michael Landau, Ethan Johns, Bill Payne, Bernie Leadon and Albert Lee. The sessions for this and Watson's debut album Blue Slipper were the first time members of Little Feat had worked together since Lowell George died in 1979.

The album spawned the single, "Hanging Out the Washing (In a Small Backyard)", a duet with Andy Fairweather-Low. The CD single features a song recorded at the same sessions but not released on the album, "Heaven Suits You".

The Weather Inside was Watson's final album for EMI before a move to RCA for her third album, Companion Gal.

== Track listing ==
1. "I Wish That Love Was Simple"
2. "You're So Hard to Get Hold Of"
3. "The Road That Ends in Tears"
4. "The Weather Inside"
5. "Your Face"
6. "Hanging Out the Washing (In a Small Backyard)"
7. "A Thrill Enough to Know"
8. "Dangerous Daybreak"
9. "Now We'll Move the River"
10. "Ready to Fly"
11. "Letters of Introduction"
