= Suns of Arqa =

British world music collective

Background information
- Genres: Electronica; ambient; downtempo; trip hop; electro; electro-dub; dub; worldbeat; reggae fusion
- Years active: 1979–present
- Labels: EMI; Arka Sound; Antler/Subway; Rocksteady; Red Rhino; Virgin; Bop Cassettes; Liquid Sound Design; Tracks and Traces
- Members: Michael Wadada
- Website: sunsofarqa.co.uk

Suns of Arqa are a world music collective founded in 1979 by Michael Wadada (real name Michael Albert Ward, deceased 2021-10-24). Since the group's formation, over 200 people from around the world have played and recorded with them, and in many cases these were like-minded musicians Wadada met as he travelled the world. Pioneers of World Beat, Ambient, Downtempo and Electro-Dub, Suns of Arqa draw inspiration from around the world, interpreting indigenous, tribal and classical folk traditions. They have created an impressive legacy and earned worldwide recognition.

== Early days ==
Suns of Arqa started out in the World Music scene in 1979, recording their debut album Revenge of the Mozabites which was produced by Adrian Sherwood, who later became known for On-U Sound Records. In 1982, they were invited to play at the first WOMAD Festival by Peter Gabriel. They performed with Prince Far-I at Band on the Wall, his last concert before his death in 1983. Since then, they have gone on to work with a variety of musicians and performers, such as John Cooper Clarke, Professor Stanley Unwin, flautist Tim Wheater, Adrian Sherwood, singer Helen Watson and a great many others.

== The 1990s and beyond ==
In the early 1990s, Wadada started his own Arka Sound label, and started re-issuing the group's older vinyl albums on new compilation CDs. One of these, Land of a Thousand Churches, was a compilation featuring collaborations with artists such as James Young, Helen Watson and Feso Trombone. His combination of Hindu and Celtic traditions at a musical level became a trademark that ultimately became identifiable as his musical style. A few years later, Suns of Arqa worked with artists such as 808 State, A Guy Called Gerald, John Leckie, Zion Train, Muslimgauze, Youth and Astralasia. The results were a fusion of dub, drum and bass, and the existing styles which Suns of Arqa were associated with.

== Live ==
Throughout their career Suns of Arqa have played at various major music festivals, including the Glastonbury Festival, Phoenix Festival and the first WOMAD Festival. By the mid 1990s, the Suns of Arqa live setup added Scottish bagpipes, Indian strings, reggae percussion, and a variety of other instruments and sounds. They have released three live albums to date, Musical Revue (later reissued as Live with Prince Far I), Animan, and Big and Live.

== Media ==
NME have described Suns of Arqa albums as "definitely the most unusual records of all time", and added that "Some might call it 'genius'; most will just settle for the word 'insane'. Either way, the result is fascinating", while East West Journal (USA) have said "I'm not at all certain how this band manages to so cohesively merge rhythms no other group in the world has dared to mix, I only know that their music is reverent, humorous, profound, disorientating, terrifying and fantastic all at the same time.". Rick Anderson of AllMusic wrote that "Many bands claim to deal in global fusion music, but few have as firm a claim on the genre as the Suns of Arqa ... Big & Live documents several recent live performances and shows Wadada and his cohorts in top form, delivering everything from Celtic-reggae fusion 'Om Kaaraaya' ... to Asian meditational sounds ... and sounds in between, such as 'Majhi Ra', which adds the keening tones of the shenai to the Celtic-reggae mix. There are fine vocal performances by Angel Eye, Reba Bhaduri and Cat Von Trapp ... some listeners will find this music immediately delightful, while other will probably be mostly puzzled."

== Suns of Arqa musicians and collaborators ==
- Michael Wadada (founder, creator of Suns of Arqa since 1979)
- Angel Eye (since 1989)
- Sanyogita Kumari (since 1987)
- Johar Ali Khan (since 1992)
- Kadir Durvesh (1987–2000)
- Gagarin (since 1987)
- John Snelson (1992–1999)
- Marek Miczyk (1982–1999)
- John Perkins (1987–1994)
- Prince Far I (1982–1983)
- Marcel King (1987)
- Graham Massey (1987–1990)
- Raghunath Seth (1992–2010)
- Youth (since 1992)
- A Guy Called Gerald (1994)
- John Leckie (since 1999)
- Alex Paterson (since 2000)
- Greg Hunter (since 1992)
- John Cooper Clarke (1987–2004)
- Roland Beelen (since 1983)
- Adrian Sherwood (1979–1980)
- Style Scott (1980)
- Chris Joyce (1982–1992)
- Prince Hammer (1982–1987)
- Keshav Sathe (1982–1987)
- Helen Watson (1982–1987)
- Kenny Margolis (1983–1985)
- Professor Stanley Unwin (1985–1987)
- Steve Hopkins (1987)
- James Young (1987)
- Roly Wynne (1994–1995)
- Bryn Jones (1996)
- Damon Reece (2003)
- Philippe Falliex (2007)
- Skip McDonald (2011)
- Delroy 'Sticksman' Walker (since 1992)
- Shaun Davis (since 2001)
- Brian Hyphen (since 2015)
- DJ Guapo (2005–2009)
- Kuba (since 2017)
- Tim Wheater (since 1989)
- Wayne Worm (1982–1994)
- Eric Random (1984–1988)
- Ian Green (1979-1980)
- Moot Beret (1980–1987)
- Mark Stone (1980)
- Tony Sullivan (1980)
- Anton Behrendt (1982)
- Big Red (1982–1983)
- Chris Gill (1982)
- Marie Louise Jackson (1982)
- Brian Jones (1982)
- Mustaphafakir (1982–1983)
- Danny Sheals (1982–1987)
- John 'JJ' Slater (1982-1983)
- Snuff (1982)
- Spliff (1982–1983)
- Tony Trundel (1982)
- Aziz Zeria (1982–1985)
- Kalu Zeria (1982–1995)
- Papu Zeria (1982–1983)
- Steve Cyclepath (1983)
- The Legendary Leperds (1983)
- Keith 'Lizard' Logan (1983–1987)
- John Scott (1983–1985)
- Amar Singh (1983)
- Doctor Himadri Chaudhuri (1984–1985)
- Doreen Edwards (1984–1985)
- Madastra (1984)
- Vocal Harders (1985)
- Martin Harrison (1985)
- Stalwart (1985–1987)
- Feso Trombone (1985)
- Kwasi Asante (1987–1994)
- Daniel Broad (1987)
- Kendal Ernest (1987)
- Khalid (1987)
- Paula McKennol (1987)
- Denyse MacNamara (1987)
- Phil Mullen (1987)
- Cliff Stapleton (1987)
- Sarah Wildwitch (1987)
- Colin Wood (1987)
- Country Culture (1988)
- Country Rankin (1988–1996)
- Clare 'Ireti' Durrant (1989–1996)
- Nicolas Magriel (since 1989)
- Hassan Makki (1989)
- Sandeep Popatkar (1989–1994)
- Phil Kirby (1991–1992)
- Reba Bhaduri (1992–1995)
- Sumit Bhaduri (1992)
- Sam McGrady (1992)
- Dhevdhas Nair (1992–1994)
- Wizard (1993–1996)
- Quentin Budworth (1994-1996)
- Garbi Armii (1995–2003)
- Alex Fiennes (1995–1996)
- Srirangam S Kannan (1995)
- Rick 'The Switch' Turner (1995)
- Alan DeCampos (1996–1997)
- Lamin Jassey (1996)
- Allan Martin (1996)
- Abu Mustafa (1996)
- Thierry 'Lion Man' Negro (1996)
- Eric Trochu (1996)
- Cod (1999)
- Arif Durvesh (1999)
- Gayan Uttejak Orchestra (1999–2003)
- Laszlo Hortobagyi (1999–2001)
- Shahbaz Hussain (1999–2002)
- RJ Simms (1999)
- Becky Spellar (1999)
- Cat Von Trapp (1999)
- Clive Wills (1999–2013)
- Lyne Okey (2001)
- Geshela Ngaqang Sherap (2001)
- Agnieszka Jablonska (2003)
- Kasha (2003)
- Khaya (2003)
- Joe McGill (2003)
- Gita Sparkle (2005)
- Michael Ormiston (2009)
- Candida Valentino (2009)
- David Hendry (2011)
- Maren Lueg (2011)
- Chas Whitaker (2011)
- Steve York (2011)
- Alan McLeod (2018–2019)

== Discography ==
=== Albums ===
Title	Format	Released	Record label	Catalogue No	Additional notes
Revenge of the Mozabites	LP	1979	Rocksteady Records	MICKL01	
Wadada Magic (Vol III)	LP	1983	Antler Subway	ANTLER 024	
India? (Vol IV)	LP	1984	Rocksteady Records	1 GIL	
Ark of the Arqans (Vol 5)	LP	1985	Scarface	MFACE11	
Seven	LP	1987	Rocksteady Records	ARKA 7	
The Musical Revue	MC	1988	ROIR Europe	A-161	1982 live concert featuring Prince Far I
White Band Speak With Forked Tongue	MC	1989	Bop Cassettes	BIP 403	
Jaggernaut	LP	1989	Antler/Subway	ANT 104	
Alap-Joe-Jhala	LP/CD/MC	1992	Arka Sound	ARKA 2102 CD	13-track album
Kokoromochi	LP/CD/MC	Feb 1992	Arka Sound	ARKA 2104 CD	6-track album, includes 'Kalashree' and 'Vairabi' from 'India?', and 'Sanskrit Hymn' from 'Ark of the Arqans'. LP version does not include the two 'India?' tracks.
Shabda	CD	1995	Arka Sound	ARKA 2109 CD	14-track album
Animan	CD	1996	Arka Sound	ARKA 2110 CD	11-track live album
SOA meet Gâyan Uttejak Orchestra	CD	1999	Arqa Sound	ARKA CD 22113	8-track album
Cosmic Jugalbandi	CD	1999	Arka Sound	ARKA CD 22115	12-track album
Un1verse City	CD	2001	Arka Sound/EMI	7243 5 34968 2 1	8-track album
Magiczna Miłość	CD	2003	Arka Sound	ARKA CD 33124	11-track album, including 3 tracks from 'Wadada Magic' ('Brujo Magic', 'Steppin to the Music', 'The Step'), sleeve designed by Skip Sommerville
Hallucinasia	CD	Nov 2005	Arka Sound	ARKA CD 33125	12-track album, sleeve designed by Skip Sommerville
Big and Live	CD	Feb 2006	Arka Sound	ARKA CD 33129	12-track live album, including 3 remixes based on tracks from 'Musical Revue', sleeve designed by Skip Sommerville
Scared Sacred	CD	2009	Dragonfly Records	BFLCD90	7-track album
Know Thyself	CD	2010	Interchill Records	ICHILL CD 040	4-track album
Stranger Music	CD/DVD	Apr 2011	Arka Sound	ARKA CD 33137	15-track album packaged with 12-track Live DVD
All Is Not Lost, But Where Is It ?	CD	Mar 2015	Liquid Sound Design	LSD91CD	7-track album
Wadada	CD	26 February 2016	Tracks & Traces	Footprint 201502	11-track album including remixes
Spiritual Sanity in an Insane Society	Digital	11 April 2016	Arka Sound	ARKA CD 33139	18-track album including new tracks, new Brian Hyphen remix, and older rarities
23,789 Day Excursion To Planet Earth	Digital	18 November 2016	Arka Sound	ARKA CD 33141	15-track album including new tracks, older rarities, and remixes by Adrian Sherwood, Brian Hyphen, Astralasia and others
The Space Mountain Sessions	Digital	13 December 2017	Arka Sound		6-track album including live recordings from Space Mountain Festival, and remixes by Kuba
Pressure Drop - A Tribute to Lizard Logan	Digital	11 March 2018	Arka Sound	ARKA CD 33144	10-track album of old Suns of Arqa recordings covering classic reggae tracks, including mixes and edits by Adrian Sherwood, John Brierley and Brian Hyphen
Cape Town Rock	Digital	27 April 2018	Arka Sound	ARKA CD 33145	11-track album including new single 'Cape Town Rock', live recordings from Cape Town, and remixes by Youth, Astralasia, Gaudi, Gagarin, and Brian Hyphen
Ambyss	Digital	6 January 2019	Arka Sound	ARKA 33151	4-track album including live recordings from Ozora Festival, Hungary August 2018
Bringing Light to the New World Disorder	4xCD	27 March 2020	Digital Reprints	DR010LE	59-track box set of rarities, produced by Michael Wadada, mixed by Brian Hyphen
The Wolf of Badenoch	CD	5 June 2020	Arka Sound	ARKACD 33149	12-track album produced by Michael Wadada, arranged and mixed by Brian Hyphen
Live At Télérama	Digital	5 March 2021	Arka Sound	ARKA33156	8-track live album recorded in Paris in 2006

=== Remix albums ===
Title	Format	Released	Record label	Catalogue No	Additional notes
Jaggernaut (Whirling Dub)	CD	1992	Arka Sound	ARKA 2103 CD	Remixed from Jaggernaut LP
Cradle	CD/MC	1992	Earthsounds	CDEASM 004	Remixed from Jaggernaut LP
Total Eclipse of the Suns	CD	1995	Arka Sound	ARKA 2108 CD	First album of individual remixes
Remixes Vol 2 & 3	2CD	1998	Echo Beach	LC 2188	
Technomor	CD	2001	Arka Sound	ARKA CD 22116-2	Subtitled 'Remixes Vol 4'
Muslim Gauze	CD	2001	Arka Sound	ARKA CD 22120	Remix album by 'Muslimgauze' Bryn Jones
Cradle (new remix)	CD	2002	Arka Sound	ARKA CD 33122	Remixed from Jaggernaut LP, sleeve designed by Skip Sommerville
All Is Not Lost, All Is Dub	Digital	10 December 2015	Liquid Sound Design	(None)	7-track album of remixes
Kuba Mixes	Digital	5 February 2021	Arka Sound	ARKA33155	Remix album by Kuba

=== Re-issues ===
Title	Format	Released	Record label	Catalogue No	Details
Live with Prince Far I	CD	1999	Arka Sound	ARKA 2100 CD	Re-issue of 1984 album, plus 4 radio sessions, plus 'Thunder Bolt, Dark Void' ('Ark of the Arqans'), 'Hey Jagunath' ('Govinda Go')
Govinda's House	CD	2001	Arka Sound	ARKA CD 22117	Re-issue of Disc 2 from 'Remixes 2 & 3' with an extra mix by The Orb
Aberglaube	CD	2001	Arka Sound	ARKA CD 22118	Re-issue of Disc 1 from 'Remixes 2 & 3'
Revenge of the Mozabites	CD	2001	Arka Sound	ARKA CD 33116	Bonus track added (see article)
Seven	CD	2002	Arka Sound	ARKA CD 33125	Updated track listing (see article)
Alap-Joe-Jhala	MP3	27 July 2005	Arka Sound	B001GQAGME	Re-issue of 1992 CD, without the four opening remixes, instead starting with additional track 'Gavati'
Re-mixs Muslimgauze	CD	2007	Soleilmoon	SOL 158 CD	Re-issue of most of 'Muslim Gauze' with more complete versions of mixes, plus new mixes of 'Whirling Dub', 'Sensi Palestine', 'Horses of the Apothecary'
Revenge of the Mozabites	CD	30 October 2017	Corbett vs. Dempsey	CvsD / CD037	Re-issue of debut LP with three bonus mixes/edits by Brian Hyphen (see article)

=== Singles ===
Title	Format	Released	Record label	Catalogue No	Details
Soul To Save	7"	1980	Rocksteady Records	MICK 010	B-side is an edit of 'Ananta Snake Dance' from 'Revenge of the Mozabites'
Mysteries of the East	12"	1982	Virgin Records	600 642	Jhalib's 'Mysteries of the East', backed by an edit of 'Ananta Snake Dance' from 'Revenge of the Mozabites'
GD Magick	12"	Oct 1983	Antler Records	ANTLER 018	New track 'GD Magick', plus a remix of 'Acid Tabla' from 'Revenge of the Mozabites', and 'Throw Away Your Guns/Whatyougonnadoonjudgementday' from 'Musical Revue'
Pressure Drop	7"/12"	1984	Vogue Belgique	VB788	B-sides are 'World Peace AD' and 'Scully's Reel' from 'Revenge of the Mozabites'
Champs-Élysées	7"	1985	CNR Music	?	Artist billed as 'SOA Band', B-side is Sprout Head Uprising Mash-Up
In Paradisum	12"	1987	Rocksteady Records	1 G1T	Artist billed as simply 'Arka', features 'In Paradisum' 7" Single Mix, Disco Dub Mix, and 'Erasmus Meets the Earthling'
Govinda's House	12"	1988	Antler Records	ANT 094	B-side is 'In The City of Nine Gates' (dub mix of the A-side)
Govinda Go	12"	1990	Arka Sound	ARKA SOUND 2112	Features 'Govinda Go (808 Massey Mix)' and 'Hey Jagunath'
Sul-E-Stomp	CD/12"	1992	Magick Eye	EYE CD 16	Remixes of 'Sully's Reel' from 'Revenge of the Mozabites' by Astralasia, various 12" versions released
Govinda's Dream	CD	22 August 1994	Arka Sound	ARKA 601 CD	Remixes of earlier 'Govinda's House' single by Astralasia, Phil Kirby, A Guy Called Gerald
Erasmus Meets The Earthling	CD	1994	Arka Sound	ARKA 602 CD	Remixes of 'Erasmus', Jaggernaut, and 'What Does It Profit' by Phil Kirby, Youth and Greg Hunter
DJ Files	12"	1995	Arka Sound	ARKA 602	Remixes of Jaggernaut, and 'What Does It Profit' by Phil Kirby, Youth and Greg Hunter
Govinda's Dream (Remixes)	12"	1995	Arka Sound	ARKA 601R	Two remixes from United Spirits of Rhythm and A Guy Called Gerald
Tomorrow Never Knows (Promo)	12"	2001	EMI	12ARQWL 001	Two remixes of 'Tomorrow Never Knows' by Chicken Lips, plus The Orb remix of 'Children of Jumma'
Brujo Magic	12"	2012	Emotional Rescue	ERC 002	Previously unreleased versions of Brujo Magic and Ananta Snake Dance
Acid Tabla	12"	2016	Emotional Rescue	ERC 033	Includes new 12" version of Acid Tabla, and new remix of Asian Rebel by Brian Hyphen

=== Compilations ===
Title	Format	Released	Record label	Catalogue No	Details
Vol 2+3 Eclecticism	MC	1983	One G Productions	1G 1	Tracks from 'Revenge of the Mozabites', 'Wadada Magic' and 'GD Magick'
Arqaology: Wadada 1979 to 1986	LP	1986	One G Productions	1G 2L	Tracks from 'Revenge of the Mozabites', 'Wadada Magic', 'GD Magick', 'Ark of the Arqans' and two tracks by Sprout Head Uprising ('Nothing to Sing Part II' and 'Hard Life')
Land of a Thousand Churches	CD/MC	1991	Arka Sound	ARKA 2101 CD	New remixes of 'The Truth Lies Therein' and 'Open The Door To Your Heart', plus tracks from 'India?', 'Ark of the Arqans', 'Seven' and 'Govinda Go'
Arqaology	LP/CD/MC	1992	Arka Sound	ARKA 2105 CD	New remixes of 'Brujo Magic' and 'City of Nine Gates', plus tracks from 'Revenge of the Mozabites', 'Wadada Magic', 'GD Magick'
Solar Activity 1979–2001	2CD	2001	Arka Sound/EMI	7243 5 31592 2 1	Compilation
A Brief History of SOA	CD	25 November 2002	Arka Sound	ARKA 2111 CD	Compilation
Tributey	CD	2003	Arka Sound	ARKA 33123 CD	Compilation featuring interviews with Professor Stanley Unwin
Through The Gate We Go	2CD	2008	Arka Sound	ARKACD 33133	27-track DJ Mix by Tom Fu
Arqatronic	Digital	1 October 2018	Arka Sound	ARKACD33147	12-track DJ Mix by Brian Hyphen
Revelation XVII	LP	15 April 2022	Sleepers	SLPRS013	10-track Compilation

=== Videos ===
Title	Format	Released	Record label	Catalogue No	Details
Hindu Pict	DVD	6 November 2006	Arka Sound	ARKA 12306 DVD	20-track DVD including live footage, interviews and music/video mixes
Stranger Music	DVD	Apr 2011	Arka Sound	ARKA CD 33137	15-track Live DVD (with CD Album) recorded Wiltshire 2010, Big Chill 2009, Glastonbury 2008
