= Jaggernaut =

Studio album by Suns of Arqa
- Released: 1989
- Genre: Trance; Reggae
- Length: 41:17
- Label: Antler/Subway ANT 104
- Producer: Michael Wadada

Suns of Arqa chronology
White Band Speak With Forked Tongue (1989)	Jaggernaut (1989)	Alap-Joe-Jhala (1992)

Jaggernaut is the seventh studio album by the band Suns of Arqa, released in 1989 by Antler/Subway Records. The album was produced by Suns of Arqa founder Michael Wadada.

Although the album has never been released on CD, it was remixed by Youth, Greg Hunter and Astralasia in 1992 and released on CD under the new title 'Jaggernaut Whirling Dub'.

The original Jaggernaut LP is in four parts. Side A contains the first two, which are based on ragas Bhairavi & Bhupali, and Side B contains interpretations of ragas Yaman Kalyam & Misra Pahvadi.

These would later become some of the most often remixed Suns of Arqa tracks, as remixes of the album produced not only Jaggernaut Whirling Dub, but also 'Cradle' (1992) and a further remix album of 'Cradle' in 2002. The B-Sides of a later single 'Erasmus Meets The Earthling' were three tracks remixed from Jaggernaut Whirling Dub, entitled "Whirling Dub", "Whirling Full" and "Whirling Forest".

And these re-remixes were themselves remixed further... "Whirling Dub" was yet again remixed by Bryn Jones for Musilimgauze and "Whirling Forest" was remixed for the album 'Technomor' in the late 1990s!

== Track listing ==
=== Side A ===
1. "Jagnath Bhairavi" – 10:52
2. "Jagannath Bhupali" – 9:06 gt

=== Side B ===
1. "Jaggernnath Yaman Kalyan" – 8:45
2. "Juggernaut Misra Pahvadi" – 12:33

== Personnel ==
This album features Kadir Durvesh on Shenai, Tim Wheater on Flute, Marek Miczyk on Violin and Wadada on Bass and Acoustic Guitar
