= Stanley Unwin (comedian) =

British comic actor and writer (1911–2002)

- Born: 7 June 1911; Pretoria, Transvaal, Union of South Africa
- Died: 12 January 2002 (aged 90); Daventry, Northamptonshire, England
- Resting place: Long Buckby, Northamptonshire, England
- Other name: "Professor" Stanley Unwin
- Education: Regent Street Polytechnic
- Occupations: Comic actor and writer
- Years active: Late 1940s–1998
- Employer: BBC (1940s)
- Agent(s): Johnnie and Patsy Riscoe
- Known for: Inventing "Unwinese" language
- Spouse: Frances Anne Martin (m. 1937; died 1993)
- Children: 3
- Website: www.stanleyunwin.com

Stanley Unwin (7 June 1911 – 12 January 2002), sometimes known as Professor Stanley Unwin, was a British comic actor and writer.

He invented his own comic language, "Unwinese", referred to in the film Carry On Regardless (1961) as "gobbledygook". Unwinese was a corrupted form of English in which many of the words were altered in playful and humorous ways, as in its description of Elvis Presley and his contemporaries as being "wasp-waist and swivel-hippy". Unwin claimed that the inspiration came from his mother, who once told him that on the way home she had "falolloped (fallen) over" and "grazed her kneeclabbers".

== Early life ==
Unwin's parents, Ivan Oswald Unwin (1880–1914) and his wife, Jessie Elizabeth (née Brand; 1883–1968), emigrated from England to the Union of South Africa in the early 1900s. Their son was born in Pretoria in 1911. Following his father's death in 1914, Unwin's mother arranged for the family to return to England. She worked as a cook at Bow Road police station. By 1919 Unwin had been sent to the National Children's Home in Congleton, Cheshire. In the late 1920s he studied radio, television and languages at Regent Street Polytechnic in London.

In 1937 he married Frances, with whom he had two daughters and a son. Unwin later stated that Unwinese had its roots in enlivening the bedtime stories that he used to tell his children. In 1940 he was given a job in transmitter maintenance for the BBC and assigned to the Borough Hill transmitting station in Daventry. Unwin, Frances and their nine-month-old daughter, Marion, moved to Long Buckby, in Northamptonshire, where Unwin would live for the rest of his life.

== Comedy career ==
Unwin's early career and training introduced him to wireless and radio communication, and this, coupled with work in the BBC's War Reporting Unit from about 1944, ultimately proved to be his passage into the media.

While based in Birmingham from 1947 to 1951 Unwin made his first, accidental, transmission. While testing equipment he gave the microphone to broadcaster F.R. "Buck" Buckley, who ad-libbed a spoof commentary about an imaginary sport called "Fasche". Buckley then introduced Unwin as "Codlington Corthusite", whereupon Unwin continued the sketch in Unwinese. The recording was broadcast on Pat Dixon's Mirror of the Month programme and a favourable audience reaction led to the commissioning of another sketch, in which Unwin, playing an inhabitant of Atlantis, was interviewed about life in the sunken city. A letter of praise from Joyce Grenfell, whom Unwin admired, gave him confidence and he determined on a career in show business.

After the war, while in Egypt and recording a series of shows by Frankie Howerd, Unwin stood in for the comedian when Howerd fell ill. Unwin's next major breakthrough came when producer Roy Speer introduced him to the comedian Ted Ray. Once Ray had heard Unwin talking, he said simply: "I want him in the series" – namely, The Spice of Life, co-starring June Whitfield and Kenneth Connor. During the mid-1950s Unwin performed in about a dozen shows for Speer and made the acquaintance of Johnnie Riscoe and his daughter, Patsy, who would become his managers for the rest of his career. By the end of the 1950s Unwin had ventured into the film industry, being given a part in the Cardew Robinson film Fun at St Fanny's (1956).

In December 1959 Unwin appeared with Steve Race in a Boxing Day edition of the BBC Light Programme's Just Jazz in an early evening Saturday broadcast of the jazz record programme as "Professor Stanley Unwin, Professor of Jazz Studies at Brewflade University".

In 1968 Unwin was invited to narrate Happiness Stan, a six-song fairy tale about a boy of the same name, taking up the entire side two of the Small Faces' album Ogdens' Nut Gone Flake, which reached number 1 in the UK Albums Chart.

In 1969 appeared in Gerry Anderson's Supermarionation TV series The Secret Service, both in person and as the voice of the puppet character Father Stanley Unwin, whose appearance was based on him. Episodes typically consisted of one or more scenes in which the character of Unwin would attempt to baffle opponents with his gobbledegook. When Lew Grade, Anderson's financial backer and head of distributor ITC, was introduced to the Unwinese dialogue, he cancelled the production on the basis that he believed viewers would not understand what Unwin was saying, despite the fact that such confusion was intentional.

Though professionally retired in his later decades, Unwin still continued to make occasional appearances. In the 1970s he appeared on The Max Bygraves Show on ITV, sometimes speaking normally and sometimes in gobbledegook. In the final episode Bygraves tested a number of gobbledegook phrases on Unwin, who claimed that he could not understand them. In 1985 Unwin recorded with Suns of Arqa on their album Ark of the Arqans, providing spoken accompaniment in Unwinese on the first three tracks. In 1987 he recorded again with Suns of Arqa on their track Erasmus Meets The Earthling, featured on their album Seven, and a remixed version of this track was released again in the 1990s. He appeared as himself in a hospital scene of Inside Victor Lewis-Smith. In 1994 Unwin collaborated with British dance music act Wubble-U on their single Petal; on its rerelease in 1998 the track ranked number 55 in the UK Chart. In 1998 Unwin made a cameo appearance in the Aardman Animations series Rex the Runt, as an accountant who speaks largely in fairly standard English, occasionally lapsing inexplicably into Unwinese.

=== Unwinese ===
Unwinese, also known as Basic Engly Twenty Fido, was an ornamented and mangled form of English in which many of the words were deliberately corrupted in a playful and humorous manner but which was still largely comprehensible to the listener. Unwin's performances could be hilarious yet disorientating, where the meaning and context were conveyed in a disguised and picturesque style. For example in his talk on music, Populode of the Musicolly, Unwin says:

They do in fact go back to Ethelrebbers Unready, King Albert's burnt capers where, you know, the toast fell in and the dear lady did get a very cross knit and smote him across the eardrome excallybold. The great sword which riseyhuff and Merlin forevermore was the beginning of the Great Constitution of the Englishspeaking peeploders of these islone, oh yes.

Unwinese has been compared to Lewis Carroll's nonsense poetry, such as Jabberwocky, where the sentences sound superficially like English when read aloud but their precise meaning is unclear.

=== Selected works ===
- Fun at St Fanny's (1955, film) as The Guide
- Beyond Our Ken (1958, radio, cameo)
- Rotatey Diskers with Unwin (1960, LP of Unwinese)
- The Miscillian Manuscript (1961, travel journal in Unwinese, illustrated by Roy Dewar)
- Inn for Trouble (1960, film) as Farmer
- Carry On Regardless (1961, film) as Landlord
- House & Garbidge (1962, book spoofing home and lifestyle magazines, with Dewar)
- Advertisement for India Autoways (TV/cinema) (1966) (car-tyre manufacturer) with Raymond Baxter
- Rock-a-Bye Babel and Two Fairly Tales (1966, book of spoof nursery rhymes and fairy tales, with Dewar)
- Unwin Time (1966, 13 x 5 mins series made by ATV Midlands) Professor Stanley Unwin explains the basics of a sport or hobby. Editions included The Skill of Boatyfloating, All Horse Trot and Jumpy, and All Fish and Dangley
- Press for Time (1966, film) as Mr Nottage (Town Clerk)
- Ogdens' Nut Gone Flake (Small Faces album, 1968, as Narrator of Side 2)
- Chitty Chitty Bang Bang (1968, film) as Chancellor of Vulgaria
- The Secret Service (1969, TV series) as Father Stanley Unwin
- Pirelli Tyres TV advertisement (1980, featuring slogan "Outstandifold in the wetty grippers")
- The Laughing Prisoner (The Tube TV Special) (1987, TV, The Prisoner parody)
- Just a Minute (1987, 1989; radio)
- Shaun the Sheep Movie (2015, archive footage)

== Death and legacy ==
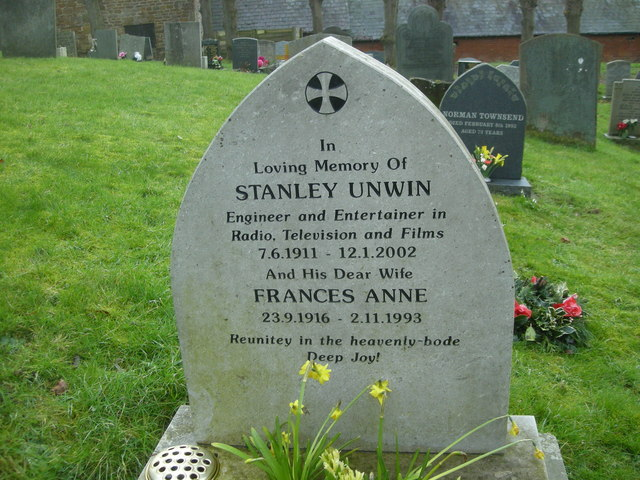
Unwin's grave in Long Buckby

Unwin died at Danetre Hospital in Daventry on 12 January 2002. He is buried in the churchyard at Long Buckby, with Frances, who predeceased him in 1993. Their gravestone bears the epitaph, "Reunitey in the heavenly-bode – Deep Joy!".

A thanksgiving service was held at St Lawrence's Church in Long Buckby and ended with a rendering of "Bye Bye Blackbird" by John Percival and friends. The valediction had been prepared by Unwin's family in his own style: "Goodly Byelode loyal peeploders! Now all gatherymost to amuse it and have a tilty elbow or a nice cuffle-oteedee – Oh Yes!"

Suns of Arqa released a tribute album to Unwin (entitled Tributey) following his death, featuring a selection of his works with the band over the years, as well as various interviews.

Unwin's work is considered to have been a significant influence on the two books written by John Lennon: In His Own Write (1964) and A Spaniard in the Works (1965).
