= Deke Arlon =

British music manager

Deke Arlon (born Anthony Howard Wilson) is a British music publisher and music manager whose clients included Kenny Young, Sheena Easton, Ron Grainer, Elaine Paige, Dennis Waterman, Helen Watson, and Marti Pellow.

== Career ==
=== Early career ===
Arlon began his own band Deke Arlon and the Tremors in 1959 where the band established itself in the south coast England rock scene. In 1964, Deke Arlon and his then group The Offbeats recorded a session with 1960s pop producer Joe Meek. This resulted in one single, "I'm Just A Boy/Can't Make Up Mind" released on Columbia. He went on to record another single for His Master's Voice in 1964, and three more singles for Columbia during 1965 and 1966, all solo recordings. Arlon eventually went on to do theatre and television shows, such as Dad You're a Square, Thank Your Lucky Stars and Crossroads where he met his future wife, Jill. It was the prospect of securing a mortgage, with its demand of a 'proper' job with proof of a regular income that forced Arlon into what was to have been a temporary career move from performing to music publishing.

At Chappell Music he worked on newly discovered trunk songs by Gershwin and the scores to theatrical successes like Fiddler on the Roof, Sweet Charity, Cabaret, and Canterbury Tales.

Arlon was sought out by CBS and at age 23 was made managing director and senior vice-president of the newly formed April-Blackwood Music. It was 1968 and in the following years the company were involved with Gilbert O'Sullivan, James Taylor, Nicky Chinn (of ChinnyChap), Chip Taylor, Al Gorgoni, Billy Vera, and bands Blood Sweat and Tears, and Chicago. The company acquired major copyrights of "Everybody's Talking" (Midnight Cowboy), "Hey Joe" by Jimi Hendrix, and "Think" by Aretha Franklin. Film score credits included Scrooge and the award-winning Z written by the imprisoned Greek composer Theodorakis.

=== 1970 – 1989 ===
The mid-1970s saw him lured away from April Music by Yorkshire Television who, eager to set up their own record and publishing companies, offered him the additional position of managing director of three of its major subsidiaries. Two years later he set up his own independent company, not just as a publisher but as an artist manager too.

Many of his artists over the next thirty years was diverse but all were hugely successful. Kenny Young, a client from his early April Music days, sold millions of albums on both sides of the Atlantic with songs such as "Under the Board Walk" and "Captain of Your Ship." Additionally, there was Ron Grainer responsible for the themes to Dr Who, To Sir with Love, Tales of the Unexpected and the music for Robert and Elizabeth. With clients Ned Sherrin and Caryl Brahms, the Arlons entered the arena of theatre production. Their first venture together was the acclaimed musical Nickleby and Me, followed by I Gotta Shoe, Only in America, Okay, The Mitford Girls, and Side By Side By Sondheim. It was Sherrin's performance in the hit Broadway version of the latter that led to his own television series We Interrupt this week. Devised by Sherrin and produced by him and Arlon this ran for 26 weeks on WNET, America. Back in Britain, the success of Side by Side spawned a long running TV series Song by Song by… again produced by the Arlons.

The late 1970s and 1980s was an era of achievement after record producer Christopher Neil joined up with Arlon. With Neil producing and Arlon managing, the career of a young Sheena Easton was launched selling millions of records around the world. Songwriter singer Gerard Kenny was another success whose songs were recorded by the likes of Barry Manilow ("Made It Through The Rain"). The alliance of Neil and Arlon led to the sales of more millions of albums with artists including Dollar, Gerry Rafferty, Mike + The Mechanics, a-ha, Morten Harket, Cher, Rod Stewart, Lulu, the French super-star Julien Clerc and Celine Dion.

Television sales soared when Arlon took over the management of actor Dennis Waterman broadening the scope of his career with the production of several albums. Following on the success of The Sweeney, he starred in the highly rated Minder series which was based on an idea conceived especially for Dennis by Jill Arlon - Minder was created by Leon Griffiths. Both Arlon and Waterman won Ivor Novello Awards for the title song to this series. It was with Waterman that Deke and Jill Arlon entered the film world with their first production, A Captain's Tale – The First World Cup, followed by three two-hour television films, Circles of Deceit written for him by Jill Arlon.

The steady rise of Elaine Paige's career has been guided by Arlon for over twenty years. Her recording, albums, and tour were all produced and directed by Arlon including appearing at The Great Hall in Beijing, and created legendary roles in musicals including Evita, Chess, Anything Goes, Piaff, Sunset Boulevard, both here and on Broadway, The King and I and Sweeney Todd with the New York Opera Company. More recently Arlon took on Ray Davies and the Kinks.

=== 1990 – present ===
In the mid-1990s in recognition of Arlon's wide range of experience in so many fields, the music industry invited him to be executive producer for the debut of their first major award show. Now known as The BRIT Awards, it was Arlon who produced and directed the show for the first two years so creating a prestigious profile for British pop music. It was he who first brought it to television and who then went on to sell the TV rights worldwide on behalf of the British Phonographic Industry. Arlon received the gold Novello Award for his outstanding contribution to the music industry.

In 2001, Arlon was invited to join a major public music company as Chairman of the Entertainment Division and Chairman of Music Publishing. Along with those duties his other brief was to use his knowledge to acquire companies for the group; his most outstanding acquisition was Sir Elton John's Management Company, Twenty First Artists which included the rights to Billy Elliot and the new international star James Blunt.

Arlon was called upon by the British music industry to promote and further the protection of music and theatrical copyrights around the world. He met with various official bodies in the Far East, Taiwan and Thailand. At the end of the 1980s, when Russia first opened its borders to the West, the music industry dispatched Arlon and his wife in their capacity as music business entrepreneurs and ambassadors to research and write a report on the infrastructure of the industry in Russia and to explore the possibilities of sharing our expertise and cultures. More recently, over the last four years, the Arlons were dispatched to visit various regions in China where they held many meetings with different senior government officials and discussions with sports and media experts to encourage the protection, collection and payment of copyright royalties for Eastern and Western artists, writers and performers in China and to liaise exchanges of ideas on programming, and artists not only in the field of arts but also sports.
