= Blue Slipper =

Studio album by Helen Watson
- Released: 1987
- Recorded: 1986; A&M, Los Angeles, California
- Genre: Pop
- Label: EMI/Columbia (original release); Fledg'ling Records (reissue)
- Producer: Glyn Johns

Helen Watson chronology
Blue Slipper (1987)	The Weather Inside (1989)

Professional ratings
Review scores
Source	Rating
New Musical Express	8/10

Blue Slipper is the debut studio album by the English singer-songwriter Helen Watson, released in 1987.

Like its follow up The Weather Inside the album is notable for its stellar cast of session musicians including Richie Hayward, George Hawkins, Paul Barrere, Michael Landau, Ethan Johns, Bill Payne, Bernie Leadon, Jerry Donahue and Steve Lukather. The sessions for this album were the first-time that members of Little Feat had worked together since Lowell George died in 1979.

Produced by Glyn Johns, the record was tracked at A&M Studios in Los Angeles.

"You're Not The Rule", "I'm Jealous Dear" and "When You Love Me I Get Lazy" were released as singles. The former was championed by BBC TV show No Limits which played the accompanying video on several occasions.

The album was reissued on CD by Fledg'ling Records on 19 September 2006 featuring two tracks originally released on 12" singles and two previously unreleased demo recordings.

== Track listing ==
- All songs written by Helen Watson and Martin McGroarty, except where noted.
1. "You're Not The Rule You're the Exception"
2. "Boys Own World"
3. "When You Love Me I Get Lazy"
4. "The New Rock Island Line"
5. "Blue Slipper"
6. "Don't Stop Now"
7. "I'm Jealous Dear"
8. "Sway"
9. "Chrome Solder" (Watson)
10. "Don't Forget to Say Your Prayers"
11. "Rock Myself to Sleep"

== Bonus Tracks on 2006 Reissue ==
1. "Speechless"
2. "Soul Infection"
3. "Don't Forget To Say Your Prayers (demo)"
4. "This Must Be Paradise (demo)"
