= Companion Gal =

Studio album by Helen Watson
- Released: 1992
- Recorded: 1992
- Studio: Rockfield Studios, Monmouth; The Mill, Cookham
- Genre: Pop
- Label: RCA
- Producer: Bob Andrews

Helen Watson chronology
The Weather Inside (1989)	Companion Gal (1992)	Notes On Desire (1995)

Companion Gal is the third album by Helen Watson, released in 1992. The album was recorded at Rockfield Studios in Monmouth, South Wales and at The Mill in Cookham. All songs were written by Helen Watson and long-time collaborator Martin McGroarty, except for "The Devil in You" (with Keith Hopwood) and "Billy But Beautiful" (Watson). The album features guest appearances from Brinsley Schwarz and Andy Fairweather-Low.

Companion Gal was Watson's only album for RCA Records, who didn't promote it.

== Track listing ==
All tracks composed by Helen Watson and Martin McGroarty; except where noted.

1. "There Must Be Some Mistake"
2. "Someone You Want to Be With (More Than Me)"
3. "Not a Word Like 'Love' in Sight"
4. "Companion Gal"
5. "Breakout the Birdcage"
6. "Billy But Beautiful" (Helen Watson)
7. "The Devil in You" (Helen Watson, Martin McGroarty, Keith Hopwood)
8. "I Won't Tell On You"
9. "Manners"
10. "When We Came to the Sea"
11. "£100 Watch"
12. "One Blue Suit"
