= Ark of the Arqans =

Studio album by Suns of Arqa
- Released: 1985
- Genre: Trance; Reggae
- Length: 23:31
- Label: Scarface MFACE 11
- Producer: Michael Wadada

Suns of Arqa chronology
India? (1984)	Ark of the Arqans (1985)	Seven (1987)

Ark of the Arkans is the fourth studio album by the band Suns of Arqa, released in 1985 by Scarface Records. The album was produced by Suns of Arqa founder Michael Wadada. The full title of the album is Suns of Arqa Vol 5 : Ark of the Arqans, Heaven and Hell, and Other Strange Faces, however it has been referred to simply as Ark of the Arqans where its tracks have appeared on re-issue CDs in later years.

It is the first album to feature Professor Stanley Unwin who provides spoken word accompaniment on some tracks. The third track, an Adrian Sherwood remix of "Heavenly Bodies", is from the movie The Earthlings.

The album Ark of the Arqans has not been released on CD, however five of the six tracks have found their way onto other Suns of Arqa CD releases.

Tracks A1, A2 and B2 ("Heavenly Bodies", "Deep Journey" and "Ark of the Arqans") all appear on the CD compilation Land of a Thousand Churches.
Track B1 ("Thunder Bolt, Dark Void") appears as a bonus track on the CD re-issue Live with Prince Far I.
Track B3 ("Sanskrit Hymn") appears on the 1992 CD Kokoromochi.

According to writer Chuck Eddy, "legend has it" that the album was a "major inspiration for acid house".

== Track listing ==
=== Side A ===
1. "Heavenly Bodies" – 3:38
2. "Deep Journey" – 3:52
3. "Heavenly Bodies (On Aid Mix)" – 5:00

=== Side B ===
1. "Thunder Bolt, Dark Void" – 3:54
2. "Ark of the Arqans" – 4:46
3. "Sanskrit Hymn" – 2:21

== Personnel ==
- Keith "Lizard" Logan - bass
- Danny Boy - drums, pennywhistle
- Michael Wadada - harmonium, shenai, instruments [sajoe], bass, guitar
- Moot Beret - Hammond organ, saxophone
- Stalwart - saxophone
- Kalu Zeria - tabla
- Eric Random - talking drum, space sounds
- Aziz Zeria - tambura
- Doctor Himadri Chaudhuri - violin and voice on track B3
- Vocal Harders - vocals (tracks A1, A3)
- Eric Random - voice (tracks B1, B2)
- Professor Stanley Unwin - voice (tracks A1, A2, A3)
