= Nyabinghi rhythm =

Rastafari religious gathering

Nyabinghi, also Nyahbinghi, Niyabinghi, Niyahbinghi, is the gathering of Rastafari people to celebrate and commemorate key dates significant to Rastafari throughout the year. It is essentially an opportunity for the Rastafari to congregate and engage in praise and worship. For example, on July 23 of each year, a Nyabinghi is held to celebrate the birth of Emperor Haile Selassie I.

During a Nyabinghi celebration men and women have different roles and expectations. Men are expected to remove any hair coverings, whilst women must keep their hair covered. A group of men typically organise themselves in a line or semi-circle and are assigned to beat the drums throughout. The remaining congregation continue to sing well known songs or 'chants', some of which are Hebraic scriptural verses that evidence the divinity of Haile Sellassie. For example, 'I have a little light in I and I'm going to make it shine, Rastafariiii, shine' and 'Holy Mount Zion is a holy place and no sinners can enter there, so let the words of my mouth and the mediation of my heart, be acceptable in thy sight, of Rastafari'. Nyabinghi is a Rastafari tradition that promotes Rastafari unity, strengthens the Rastafari spirit with fellowship and raises the consciousness and presence of Rastafafari in the heart of those in attendance. At some points passages of the bible are read. Rastafari recognise the significance of Jesus Christ, due to Haile Sellassie I fulfilling the teachings and prophecy of scripture.

== Nyabinghi music ==
The Niyabinghi resistance inspired a number of Jamaican Rastafarians, who incorporated what are known as niyabinghi chants (also binghi) into their celebrations ("groundations"). The rhythms of these chants were eventually an influence of popular ska, rocksteady and reggae music. It is the traditional music of the Rastafarian practice and it is used during "reasoning" sessions and consists of chanting and drumming to reach states of heightened spirituality. Nyabingi music consists of a blend of 19th century gospel music and African drumming.

Niyabinghi drumming is not exclusive to the Niyabinghi order, and is common to all Rastafarians. Its rhythms are the basis of reggae music, through the influential ska band, the Skatalites. It is said that their drummer revolutionized Jamaican music by combining the various Niyabinghi parts into a 'complete' "drum kit," which combined with jazz to create an entirely new form of music, known as ska. Niyabinghi rhythms were largely a creation of Count Ossie, who incorporated influences from traditional Jamaican Kumina drumming (especially the form of the drums themselves) with songs and rhythms learned from the recordings of Nigerian musician Babatunde Olatunji.

Though Niyabinghi music operates as a form of Rasta religious music outside of reggae, musicians such as Bob Marley and even non-Rastas such Prince Buster (Muslim) and Jimmy Cliff used the idiom in some songs. Recently, dancehall artist Sizzla, American roots-reggae artists such as Groundation and Jah Levi, and Hip hop have used Niyabinghi drums extensively in their recordings. Though sometimes claimed to be a direct continuation of an African cultural form, Niyabinghi drumming is best seen as the voice of a people rediscovering their African roots.

Combining Jamaican traditions with newly acquired African ones, Count Ossie and others synthesized his country's African traditions and reinvigorated them with the influences of Nigerian master-drummer Babatunde Olatunji, as a comparison of Count Ossie's Tales of Mozambique and Olatunji's earlier Drums of Passion will reveal. Indeed, it is that combination of inherited traditions and conscious rediscovery of lost African traditions that makes Niyabinghi drumming—and Rasta—so powerful.

The music originates from the Asante of modern-day Ghana (which is also the name of the dance which the drums are used for) via the trans-Atlantic slave trade and then in Burru music, which was played in Jamaica as far back as the early 20th century. They became commonly used in Kingston ghettos in the mid 20th century, after being introduced by migrants from rural Jamaica.

=== Drums ===
Three kinds of drums (called harps or collectively akete) are used in niyabinghi: A larger bass (also called "baandu" or thunder) drum, a middle pitched "funde" (or "fundeh"), and a high pitched repeater or kete. The funde and repeater are of similar size, but the funde has a slack drum head while the repeater has a tighter head, giving a higher note. The drums are double-membraned, with heads are generally made of goat skin.

The akete (also known as the "repeater") plays an improvised syncopation, the funde plays a regular one-two beat and the bass drum strikes loudly on the first beat, and softly on the third beat (of four). When groups of players get together, only one akete player may play at any one time. The other drums keep regular rhythms while the akete players solo in the form of a conversation. Only Rastamen are allowed to play drums at Nyahbingi.

There are membranophones played at a groundation ceremony in rasta culture. Nyabinghi music is played in 4/4 time on three drums:

- Thunder: It is a double-headed bass drum, played with a mallet. The strokes are an open tone on 1 and a dampened stroke on 3. Occasionally, the thunder player will syncopate the rhythm. It is typically held in the lap and beaten with a padded stick (a tennis ball is often used).
- Funde: The funde is the middle drum. It maintains the rhythms, on 2 and 4. It is held on the floor between the knees and played with the palms.
- Repeater: The repeater or kete, is the smallest and highest pitched drum. It is somewhat of a single elongated bongo. The drummer tends to play around 2 and 4, with a syncopated, rather than a backbeat feel. These beats are important to the overall feel of the Nyahbingi rhythm, but the repeater has a very improvisational role in bingi because it is seen as the carrier of spirit. It is held on the floor between the knees and played with the fingertips.

=== Shekere ===
The shekere or shaka, which is commonly found throughout Africa and the Caribbean Latin America is also used in Nyahbingi. The shekere player has a somewhat flexible role: He/she has been known to play on “1”, “1&”, “1” and “3” or “1&”...“3&”

=== Chants ===
Niyabinghi chanting typically includes recitation of the Psalms, but may also include variations of well-known Christian hymns and adopted by Rastafarians. The rhythms of these chants were eventually an influence of popular ska, rocksteady and reggae music. The chants contain ideas of black redemption and repatriation. They help people to participate and feel included in the Rastafarian community.

== See also ==
- Mansions of Rastafari
- Reggae genres
