= Helen Watson (singer-songwriter) =

- Origin: Manchester, England
- Genres: Folk; blues; soul; jazz; pop
- Occupations: Singer; songwriter
- Years active: 1960s–present
- Labels: EMI; Columbia; RCA; Building; Fledg'ling
- Website: helenwatson.net

Helen Watson is an English singer-songwriter. Her music encompasses blues, soul, jazz, pop and folk.

== Biography ==
Born in Manchester, she began performing on the folk-club circuit during the late 1960s whilst working as a teacher in Manchester. During the 1970s and 1980s she was a singer with blues band Loose Lips and a member of the Manchester quartet Well Knit Frames, which also included Martin McGroarty (who would become her regular writing partner). Watson was also a backing singer with Carmel on an extensive world tour. She sang on several of Suns of Arqa's early LPs (Musical Revue, Wadada Magic, India?) which were released between 1983 and 1984.

Watson made a demo tape with McGroarty which found its way to Keith Hopwood at Pluto Music. Hopwood signed Watson and introduced her to music publisher and manager Deke Arlon. Soon afterwards, Watson signed with EMI Records, releasing her debut album Blue Slipper in 1987. Produced by Glyn Johns, the record featured contributions from various notable musicians including Bill Payne, Richie Hayward, Paul Barrere, George Hawkins, Michael Landau, Steve Lukather and Bernie Leadon (the first time that members of Little Feat had played together since the death of Lowell George).

A second album, The Weather Inside, came out in 1989, again produced by Glyn Johns with the same cast of session musicians and featuring Andy Fairweather-Low. Whilst signed to EMI, Watson toured supporting Joe Cocker and Black.

Watson signed to RCA for 1992's Companion Gal, which was recorded at the Rockfield Studios in Wales. Andy Fairweather-Low once again lent his talents, as did Brinsley Schwarz. In support of the album, Watson played shows at the Half Moon in Putney, the Band on the Wall and London's Tenor Clef. Lack of interest at the record company meant Watson's days working with major labels came to an end shortly afterwards.

She spent the next three years working with Christine Collister, Barb Jungr and Michael Parker as part of Hell Bent Heaven Bound, which toured the United States, Canada and Europe (and released an album of songs from the show in 1993). Watson also formed an all-female group called Daphne's Flight, (with Christine Collister, Melanie Harrold, Julie Matthews and Chris While), releasing an eponymous album in 1995.

In the ensuing decade, Watson released several albums which were mostly acoustic folk music, and toured the UK regularly. She continued to work with other artists, notably Emmylou Harris and Linda Ronstadt on their 1999 album Western Wall: The Tucson Sessions. Watson also produced Christine Collister's 1996 album Blue Aconite and appeared on releases by Ashley Hutchings.

In December 2006, Watson completed another tour of smaller venues in the UK, including shows with David Hughes and Christine Collister. From March to May 2007, she toured as singer with Snake Davis's band Burden of Paradise before returning to solo shows in July of that year. In 2008, she released the album Headrest. Two years later she released an EP, Fiver with five original songs.

== Solo discography ==
- Blue Slipper (EMI/Columbia) (1987)
- The Weather Inside (EMI/Columbia) (1989)
- Companion Gal (RCA) (1992)
- Notes on Desire (Building) (1995)
- Somersault (Fledg'ling Records) (1997)
- Doffing (Fledg'ling Records) (1999)
- Lifesize (Fledg'ling Records) (2002)
- Headrest (Independent) (2008)
- Fiver (Corvax Mewsic) (2010)
