= Echo Minott =

Echo Minott (born Noel Phillips in 1963) is a Jamaican reggae and dancehall singer whose music career began in the 1980s. His albums from his early years included collaborations with artists such as Frankie Paul and Sly & Robbie. His first release under the name Echo Minott was the 7" single Ten Miles. His early 7" single releases included double A-sides with artists such as Yellowman, Triston Palma, Johnny Osbourne and Cocoa Tea on the flipside, before his breakthrough hit single "Lazy Body" in 1985. A prolific recording artist, he has featured on over 100 releases. In the 1990s, Echo voiced his first jungle music track, a remix of "Murda Weapon". Echo Minott continues to collaborate with producers of reggae, dancehall and jungle music today.

== Political views ==
Echo's number one hit song in Jamaica "What the Hell the Police Can Do?" tackled the subject of domestic violence over a riddim recorded by Steely & Clevie. It caused some controversy in Jamaica and prompted a rush of other artists to record songs about interactions with Jamaican police. On his album with DJ Air Afrique Man a Do Road, Echo wrote a song in response to the Black Lives Matter movement and the ongoing problems of racism, police brutality and the killing of black people. A proponent of conscious dancehall, Echo has been openly critical of "dutty" dancehall lyrics in 21st century dancehall music, and has urged Jamaican artists to go back to writing conscious lyrics and to honour the roots of reggae.
