= Bop Cassettes =

Defunct independent record label

Bop Cassettes is a defunct, Manchester-based, independent record label. It released records (and cassettes) for many Manchester bands in the late 1980s, including the Man From Delmonte, Toss the Feathers, Suns of Arqa, Space Heads, Mr Spin.

Bop Cassettes was based on New Mount Street, Manchester within the same building as Mike Shaft's Sunset Radio station.

Bop Cassettes released Mr Spin Droppin' it 'Best ov Hip Hop 1988 Mix' in August 1989, UK release.
