= Revenge of the Mozabites =

Studio album by Suns of Arqa
- Released: 1980
- Recorded: Cargo Studios, Rochdale and Berry Street Studio, London, 1979
- Genre: Electronic, Reggae
- Length: 36:06 (1980 LP), 39:51 (2001 CD)
- Label: Rocksteady Records MICKL01, Arka Sound ARKA CD 33116
- Producer: Adrian Sherwood and Michael Wadada

Suns of Arqa chronology
Revenge of the Mozabites (1980)	Musical Revue (1983)

Revenge of the Mozabites is the first studio album by the band Suns of Arqa, recorded in 1979 and released in 1980 by Rocksteady Records. The album was produced by Suns of Arqa founder Michael Wadada (credited on the sleeve as Michael Mafia), and his friend Adrian Sherwood (credited on the sleeve as Adran Ridims).

The tracks on this album are completely eclectic with many different genres featured on the tracks. The styles include Dub, Irish, Indian, and a little flamenco. All tracks from this album were made available on CD in 1992 on the compilation Arqaology, released on Arka Sound.

The full album was finally released on CD with its original cover art and track listing by Arka Sound in 2001, with a bonus track "Acid Tabla Remix" which was originally released on the single "GD Magick" in 1983.

The album was re-issued on CD in the US by Corbett vs Dempsey in 2017, with three bonus tracks. 'Asian Rebel (Hyphen Dub)' is a dub remix by Brian Hyphen and both this and 'Acid Tabla (Hyphen Edit)' were previously released on the Acid Tabla 12", the latter being the 12" A-Side. 'Sanaiscara Saturn (Hyphen Edit)' is a new edit which is significantly faster and shorter than the original.

== Track listing ==
=== Light Side ===
1. "Acid Tablas" – 3:44
2. "World Peace, A Dream?" – 2:12
3. "Scully's Reel" – 1:29
4. "Bali Citra" – 3:37
5. "Scully's Jig" – 1:49
6. "Piece Of The World" – 1:08
7. "Acid Tabla Dub" – 3:00

=== Dark Side ===
1. "Ananta Snake Dance" – 7:22
2. "Return Of The Mozabites" – 3:35
3. "Sanaiscara Saturn" – 6:31
4. "Paintings Of A Cave" – 1:24
5. "Acid Tabla Remix" - 3:45 **On 2001 CD re-issue only.

=== 2017 US CD Bonus Tracks ===
1. "Asian Rebel (Hyphen Dub)" - 5:16
2. "Sanaiscara Saturn (Hyphen Edit)" - 3:54
3. "Acid Tabla (Hyphen Edit)" - 6:09

== Personnel ==
As well as founding member Michael Wadada, the band on this album features Style Scott on drums, Mark Stone on flamenco guitar, Ian Green on bassoon, Tony Sullivan on banjo and Moot Beret on Chinese Shawm.
