= Band on the Wall =

Live music venue in Manchester, England

Coordinates: 53.4852°N 2.2342°W

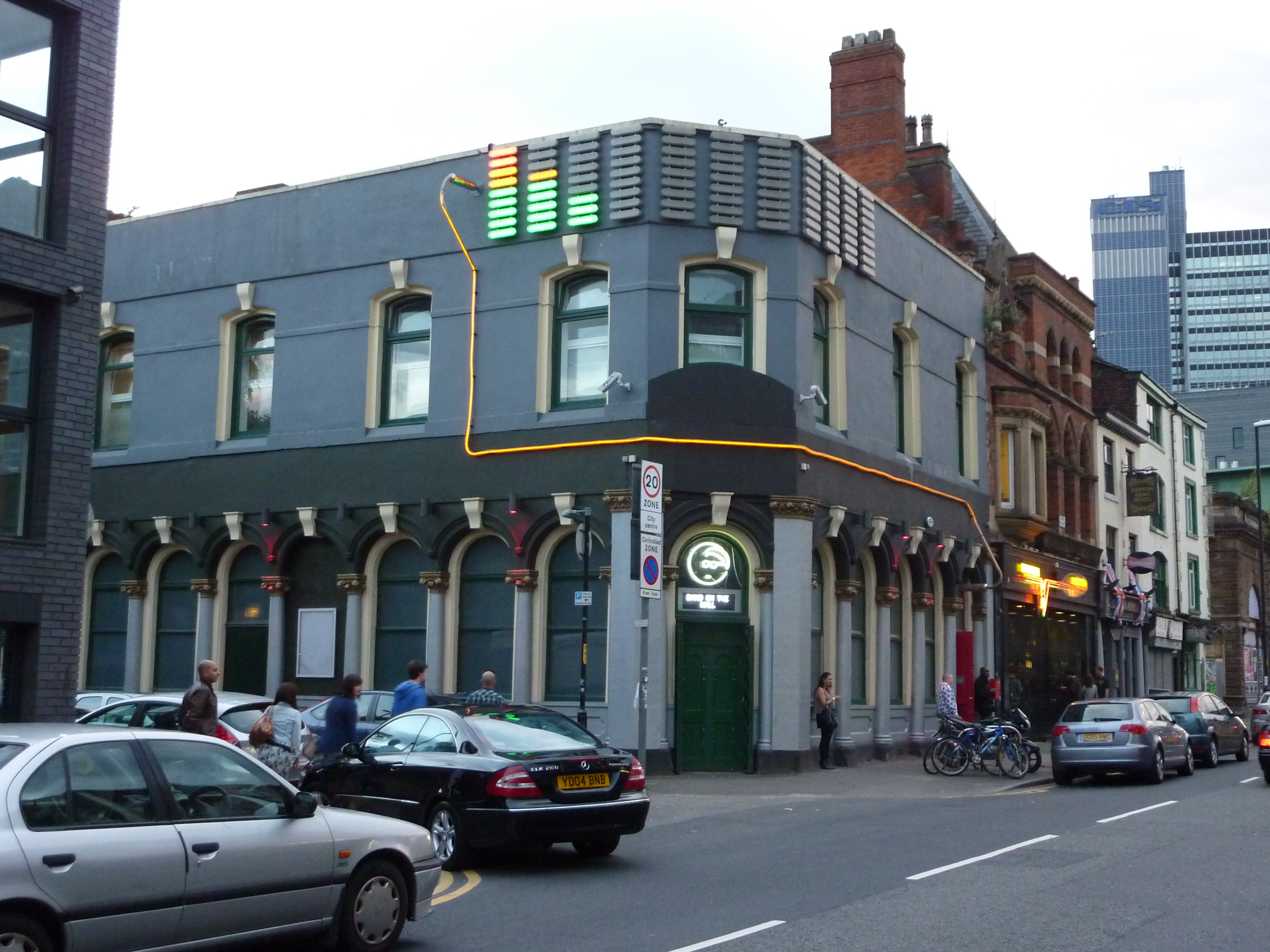
Band on the Wall pictured on the venue's 80th birthday, 7 July 2012

Band on the Wall is a live music venue in the Northern Quarter of Manchester, England.

== History ==
=== Early history ===
The building dates back to around 1862 when a local brewery, the McKenna Brothers, built it as the flagship pub of their operation. It was called the George and Dragon; the first licence on the site was granted to Elizabeth March in 1803. No-one knows when music started to be played at the venue but market pubs were well known for their musical connections, and the nearby Smithfield Markets and textile factories ensured that this was a bustling area with many musicians and buskers. Manchester was then at its height as the first industrial city at the forefront of the Industrial Revolution.

The 'Band on the Wall' was a nickname from the 1930s when the landlord of the time Ernie Tyson placed a stage high on the far wall of the pub on which the musicians played. A regular band of two accordions, piano, drums, a singer and occasionally a saxophone would play.

During World War II the venue was popular with British, American, Canadian and French servicemen, as well as the local market traders and mill workers. Italian prisoners of war and deserters were rumoured to frequent the establishment. The band often played on during air raids, particularly as they became more common. Walter Greenwood wrote that a record 24,000 bottles of beer were sold here on one day of a Bank Holiday weekend.

=== Later history ===
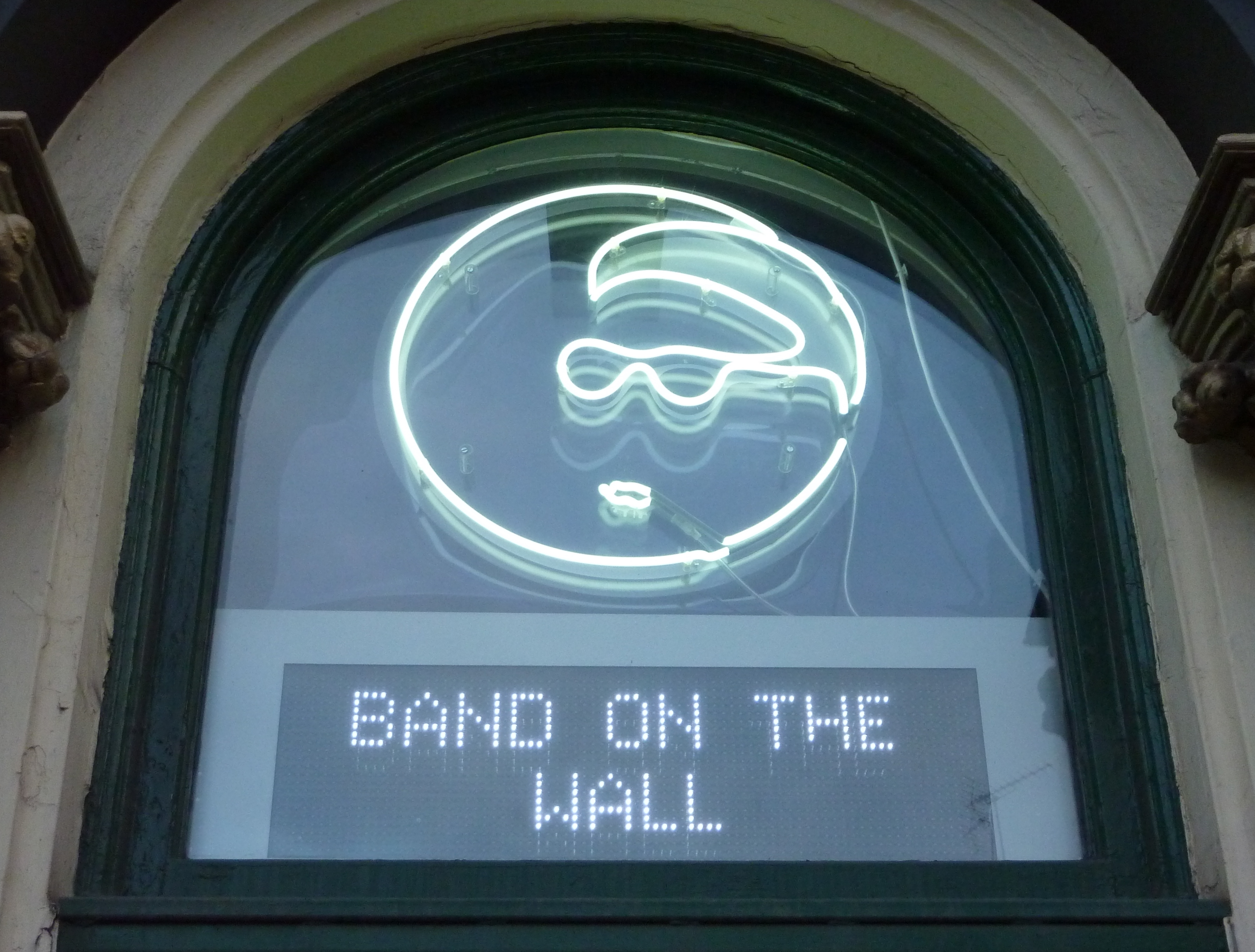
Band on the Wall's logo

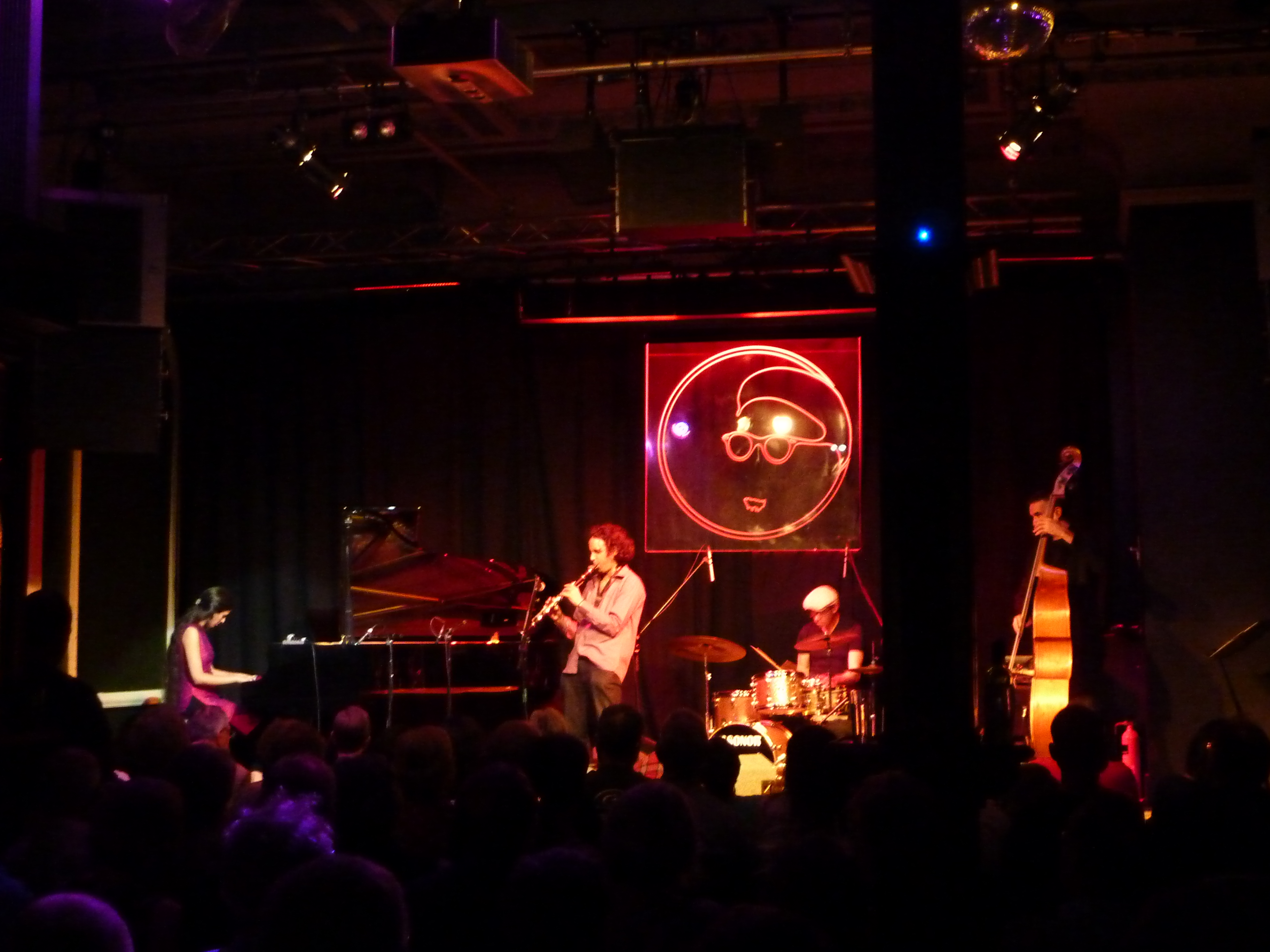
The Zoe Rahman Quartet playing at Band on the Wall during the Manchester Jazz festival in 2012

The area fell into decline during the middle of the 20th century as the textile manufacturing industry declined and many people left the area; the market was also suffering.

In 1975 local jazz musician Steve Morris and his business partner Frank Cusick bought the George & Dragon with the idea of turning it into a jazz club; a conversation with Johnny Roadhouse convinced them to name it the Band on the Wall. Jazz musicians from the local area as well as international artist played at the club. The late 1970s saw the emergence of a new sound, punk, and it was at the Band on the Wall that many of the Manchester punk bands played. This was part of the New Manchester Review nights, a fanzine and listings magazine which was the starting point for the now defunct City Life. Many notable post-punk bands played during this time including Buzzcocks and the Fall, amongst others. The venue was also used by the Manchester Musicians Collective. An album entitled A Manchester Collection was released by Object Records featuring some of those members in April 1979. Several other bands later released music through Factory Records, including Joy Division and A Certain Ratio. In 1982 the venue briefly closed for some internal redevelopment work. It was after the reopening that the Dizzy Gillespie logo was first used. It was during this decade that the venue began to gain an international reputation for so-called "World Music" and a programme that covered multiple genres. Performers who went on to gain international reputations included Mick Hucknall, who played on several occasions as Frantic Elevators. Other notable performances came from Purrkur Pillnikk, who supported The Fall for three dates in 1982, with supporting vocals from a young Björk.

=== Rebirth ===
Band on the Wall is operated by Inner City Music Ltd, a registered charity. The organisation was awarded £3.2 million in July 2007, in combined awards by Arts Council England and the Heritage Lottery Fund as part of a £4 million project to transform the venue into a 21st-century centre for music.

The building was refurbished before reopening on 25 September 2009 with a performance by the venue's patrons Julian Joseph and Mica Paris.

On 18 June 2018, Inner City Music Ltd announced that Arts Council England had approved £1.65 million stage two capital funding for the venue's Bigger, Better, Stronger expansion plan. The plans included the renovation of the derelict Cocozza building, which adjoins the venue and the enlargement of the auditorium by demolishing the wall from which it derived its name.

On 3 March 2022, Band on the Wall reopened with a larger stage and increased capacity from 350 to 520.

=== Brighter Sound ===
Brighter Sound, formerly known as GMMAZ (Greater Manchester Music Action Zone), is a creative music education company founded in 2000 which had their office at Band on the Wall. They ran music projects at the venue and elsewhere for children and young people aged up to 19, work with emerging musicians and music practitioners, and deliver organisational development for companies that work with young people through music, across Manchester and the wider North. The young people who take part write their own material and develop their skills as songwriters, musicians and collaborators. Projects last for anything from a week to a year. Brighter Sound participants have performed at the nationwide Children in Need Choir in 2011 singing "Keep Holding On" by Avril Lavigne, the Lowry Theatre, and worked with musicians such as Elbow, Schlomo and Soweto Kinch. A project delivered as a partnership between Brighter Sound and Band on the Wall in 2012 provided opportunities for emerging musicians from across the UK to work with The Unthanks.

== Awards and nominations ==
In 2009 Band on the Wall was named by the Brecon Jazz Festival as one of 12 venues which had made the most important contributions to jazz music in the United Kingdom, reflecting its history as one of Manchester's premier jazz venues and its current role in bringing music to new audiences. It finished second in the voting for the inaugural award.

In 2010, Band on the Wall's chairperson Kathy Dyson won a Parliamentary Jazz Award for her services to education, and music programmer Mike Chadwick won a silver Sony Award for his radio work. Band on the Wall's website (and developers Cahoona) won a Big Chip Award in the 'not for profit' category.

Band on the Wall was voted the 'Best Night Spot' at the 2010 Manchester Tourism Awards.

In 2017, Band on the Wall won the award for 'Best Venue Teamwork' in the 'Arts Centre' subcategory at the Live UK Music Business Awards.

Band on the Wall was voted the 'Best live venue' at the 2019 City Life Awards.

In March 2019, Attitude is Everything awarded Band on the Wall an 'Accessibility Starts Online Award' in the 'Venue under 500 capacity' category.

In April 2024 Band on the Wall Won the Nordoff & Robbins Northern Music Awards Inspirational Venue (Under 2000) Award.

== See also ==
- List of jazz clubs
- List of Music Venues
