= List of Niyabinghi chants =

Niyabinghi chanting typically includes recitation of the Psalms, but may also include variations of well-known Christian hymns and adopted by Rastafarians. The rhythms of these chants were eventually an influence of popular ska, rocksteady and reggae music. Chanting is also a ritual performed in Rastafari 'groundations' and Nyabinghi assemblies, which are days-long gatherings of rastafarians.

Niyabinghi chants include:

- "400 Million Blackman"
- "400 Years" (its lyrics influenced Peter Tosh's "400 Years")
- "Babylon In I Way"
- "Babylon Throne Gone Down" (arranged by Bob Marley to "Rastaman Chant" in 1973)
- "Banks of the River"
- "Behold Jah live"
- "Blackman Get Up Stand Up" (its lyrics influenced Bob Marley's and Peter Tosh's "Get Up, Stand Up" in 1973)
- "Brimstone"
- "Chant Zion Chant"
- "Closer Than a Brother"
- "Come sight up in Jah Army"
- "Fool Fool"
- "Have a little light in I"
- "I'n'I Riding"
- "I Am Getting Ready"
- "Idemption Trodding"
- "I Must Trod Home"
- "I Shall Not Remove" (its lyrics influenced Bob Marley's "Forever Loving Jah")
- "I Will Not Go With You"
- "Jah Got the Whole World"
- "Jah Wind Blow East"
- "Leave Babylon"
- "Little Children"
- "Mystery Babylon Have To Move" / "Him Have To Move"
- "Never Get Burn"
- "New Name"
- "No Night in Zion" (arranged and released by Culture in 1997, arranged and released by Luciano in 2001)
- "Nyahbinghi Voyage" (arranged and released by Steel Pulse)
- "One Day Nearer Home"
- "Over Hills and Valleys"
- "Peace and Love"
- "Promise to Hear I Chant"
- "Rastafari Conquer"
- "Rastafari Know What This Gathering For"
- "Rivers of Babylon" (arranged and released by The Jamaicans, Boney M arrangement became a world hit)
- "Rock-of-my Soul"
- "Rock of Ises"
- "Roll River Jordan"
- "Run Come Rally"
- "Satta Massagana"
- "Send One Mighty Ingel"
- "So Long Rastafari" (arranged by Bob Marley in 1978; arranged and released by Dennis Brown in 1979-also check out SO LONG-Count Ossie-1973)
- "Take a Sip"
- "The Lion of Judah" / "The Conquering Lion" (arranged by Bob Marley in 1976)
- "The Things You Do" (arranged and released by Sizzla Kalonji)
- "Universal Tribulation"
- "Volunteer Ithiopian"
- "What a Weeping"
- "What a Woe"
- "Will You Be Ready"
- "Zion Land"
- "We are the children of Ancient Africa"
