= Praga Khan discography =

- Studio albums: 8
- Soundtrack albums: 2
- Live albums: 2
- Compilation albums: 3
- Singles: 33
- Video albums: 1
- Remix albums: 2
- Samplers: 1

The comprehensive discography of Praga Khan, a Belgium-based new beat artist, consists of eight studio albums, two live albums, three compilation albums, two remix albums two soundtrack albums, thirty-three singles, one sampler, and one video album.

This list does not include material by Praga Khan supremo Maurice Engelen, that was recorded with 101, 2 Body's, Alpha Beta, Angel Ice, Anthony Prince, Baba Yaga, Babe Instinct, Boy Toy, Channel X, Code Red, The Damage Twins, Digital Orgasm, Dirty Harry, DNM, E-Angel, Electric Shock, The Executive Board, Forza, Groove Reactor, Heaven is Venus, Heavenly Bodies, The Immortals, JK Magick, Kaotix, Lina, Lords of Acid, M.N.O., Major Problem, Moments of Ecstasy, Mr. & Mrs. Freak, Musical Reporters, Nasty Thoughts, Overnight Sensations, Phantasia, Quinine, Rhythm Kings, Save Sex, Science Lab, Shakti, Subtrance, Tattoo of Pain, Time Zone, Tribe 22, Wild Girls, or Zsa Zsa Deluxe.

== Studio albums ==
Year	Album details	Peak chart positions
Year	Album details	BEL (FL)
1993	A Spoonful of Miracle: Released: 1993; Format: CD	—
1996	Conquers Your Love: Released: 1996; Label: Format: CD	—
1998	Pragamatic: Released: 1998; Label: Fingerlicking Good Records, Never Records; Format: CD	—
1999	Twenty First Century Skin: Released: 1999; Label: Format: CD	10
2000	Mutant Funk: Released: 2000; Label: Fingerlicking Good Records, Antler-Subway, Never Records; Format: CD	2
2002	Freakazoids: Released: 2002; Label: Fingerlicking Good Records, Antler-Subway, Never Records; Format: CD	9
2004	Electric Religion: Released: 2004; Label: Stella Artois Music, Recovered; Format: CD	28
2006	Soundscraper: Released: 2006; Label: Petrol; Format: CD	31
2013	SoulSplitter: Released: 2013; Label: SonicAngel; Format: CD	5
2017	MindGames: Released: 2017; Label: ArtFabric – ART 1702; Format: CD	—

== Live albums ==
Year	Album details
2005	The Next Dimension: Released: 2005; Label: Okina Music Group; Format: CD
2009	Frame by Frame: Released: 2009; Label: Okina Music Group; Format: CD

== Remix albums ==
Year	Album details
1999	Twenty First Century Skinned: Released: 1999; Label: Fingerlicking Good Records, Antler-Subway; Format: CD
2001	Mixed Up: Released: 2001; Label: Never Records; Format: CD

== Video albums ==
Year	Album details
2005	The Next Dimension: Released: 2005; Label: Self-released; Format: DVD

== Compilation albums ==
Year	Album details	Peak chart positions
Year	Album details	BEL (FL)
2003	Khantastic: Released: 2003; Label: Fingerlicking Good Records; Format: CD	16
2005	Essential: Released: 2005; Label: PID; Format: CD	—
2010	Alle 40 Goed: Released: 26 Feb, 2010; Label: EMI Music Belgium; Format: CD	—

== Soundtracks ==
Year	Album details
2001	Falling: Released: 2001; Label: Fingerlicking Good Records; Format: CD
2003	Not Strictly Rubens: Released: 2003; Label: Okina Music Group; Format: CD
2007	Ben X Originele muziek van de film: Released: 2007; Label: EMI Music Belgium; Format: CD

== Samplers ==
Year	Album details
1999	Praga Khan Sampler: Released: 27 July 1999; Label: Never Records; Format: CD

== Singles ==
Year	Details	Peak chart positions			
Year	Details	BEL (FL)	BEL (FL) Tip	AUS	UK
1988	"Bula Bula": Released: 1988; Label: House Records; Format: CD, 7", 12"	—	—	—	—
1989	"Out of Control": Released: 1989; Label: Beat Box International; Format: 12"	—	—	—	—
1991	"(Kick Back for the) Rave Alarm": Released: 1991; Label: Beat Box International; Format: 7", 12"	—	—	—	—
1992	"Free Your Body/Injected with a Poison": Released: 1992; Label: Sonic Records; Format: CD, 7", 12"	—	—	—	16
1992	"Injected with a Poison": Released: 1992; Label: Beat Box International; Format: CD, 12"	—	—	—	52
1992	"Rave Alert": Released: 1992; Label: Beat Box International; Format: CD, 12"	—	—	—	39
1993	"Phantasia Forever": Released: 1993; Label: RCA; Format: CD, 7", 12"	—	—	—	—
1994	"Begin to Move": Released: 1994; Label: Avex; Format: CD	—	—	—	—
1995	"Gun Buck": Released: 1995; Label: Jive; Format: CD, 12"	—	—	—	—
1996	"Love Me Baby": Released: 1996; Label: Never; Format: 12"	—	—	—	—
1996	"Jazz Trippin'": Released: 1996; Label: Never; Format: CD, 12"	—	—	—	—
1998	"Injected with a Poison '98 Remixes": Released: 1998; Label: Never; Format: CD, 12"	—	14	—	—
1999	"Lonely": Released: 1999; Label: Antler-Subway; Format: CD, 12"	—	—	—	—
1999	"Luv U Still": Released: 1999; Label: Antler-Subway; Format: CD, 12"	—	—	—	—
1999	"Breakfast in Vegas": Released: 1999; Label: Antler-Subway; Format: CD, 12"	34	—	83	—
1999	"Visions & Imaginations": Released: 1999; Label: Antler-Subway; Format: CD, 12"	—	—	—	—
2000	"The Power of the Flower": Released: 2000; Label: Antler-Subway; Format: CD, 12"	37	—	—	—
2000	"Love": Released: 2000; Label: Antler-Subway; Format: CD, 12"	—	19	—	—
2000	"Sayonara Greetings": Released: 2000; Label: Antler-Subway; Format: CD, 12"	—	—	—	—
2001	"Falling": Released: 2001; Label: Fingerlicking Good; Format: CD	—	—	—	—
2001	"Rhythm": Released: 2001; Label: Fingerlicking Good; Format: CD	—	5	—	—
2002	"Glamour Girl": Released: 2002; Label: Fingerlicking Good, Antler-Subway; Format: CD	—	6	—	—
2002	"No Earthly Connection": Released: 2002; Label: Fingerlicking Good; Format: CD	—	—	—	—
2003	"Love Power": Released: 2003; Label: Fingerlicking Good; Format: CD	—	6	—	—
2003	"Tausend Sterne": Released: 2003; Label: EMI; Format: CD	—	—	—	—
2003	"The Key to the Kingdom": Released: 2003; Label: Okina Music Group; Format: CD	—	—	—	—
2003	"Kiss the Sky": Released: 2003; Label: Fingerlicking Good; Format: CD	—	—	—	—
2004	"2004 (Life)": Released: 2004; Label: Stella Artois Music, Recovered; Format: CD	—	6	—	—
2004	"Supermodel": Released: 2004; Label: Stella Artois Music, Recovered; Format: CD	—	9	—	—
2004	"Time": Released: 2004; Label: Self-released; Format: CD	—	—	—	—
2006	"Right or Wrong": Released: 2006; Label: Okina Music Group; Format: CD	—	—	—	—
2006	"We Fuel Our Own High": Released: 2006; Label: Petrol; Format: CD	—	—	—	—
2006	"Pick-Up Truck": Released: 2006; Label: Petrol; Format: CD	—	—	—	—

== See also ==
- Maurice Engelen discography
