= Maurice Engelen discography =

The comprehensive discography of Praga Khan, a Belgium-based new beat artist, consists of all works recorded by Maurice Engelen. also known as Praga Khan.

== 101 ==
Singles

- 1988 Rock to the Beat
- 1989 Move Your Body
- 1989 Just as Long as I Got You (House Mix)
- 1989 It's Not Over
- 1990 Hear Me Coming
- 1990 Busy ZZee is in Town!

== 2 Body's ==
Singles

- 1989 B'Gay/Astoria (Split single with Spaghetti's)
- 1990 4 Dancetrax
- 1996 Astoria (Remixes)

== Alpha Beta ==
Singles

- 1989 Games for Boys
- 1990 Oh You!/Satisfaction (Split single with Miss Lie)

== Angel Ice ==
Singles

- 1991 Je N'Aime Que Toi
- 1991 Girls Come Later
- 1991 N'Aie Pas Peur

== Anthony Prince ==
Singles

- 1996 Vox-O-Matic

== Baba Yaga ==
Singles

- 1995 Rave Planet

== Babe Instinct ==
Singles

- 1997 Disco Babes from Outer Space

== Boy Toy ==
Singles

- 1989 Touch My Body

== Channel X ==
Studio albums

- 1994 To the Top
- 1997 Tuned In... Turned On

Singles

- 1991 Rave the Rhythm
- 1991 Groove to Move
- 1992 A Million Colours
- 1994 Take It to the Top
- 1995 Love is Everything
- 1996 The Rhythm of the Night
- 1996 Feel My Love / Rave in the Key of X
- 1997 Keep on Movin'
- All Your Love
- So High

== Code Red ==
Singles

- 1991 In Your Dreams / Dreams Forever
- 1992 Dreamer Dream
- 1993 Good Feelings

== Digital Orgasm ==
Studio Albums

- 1992 Appearances Are Deceptive (also released as DO It or Come Dancin in some regions)

Singles

- 1991 Moog Eruption
- 1991 Running Out of Time
- 1991 Startouchers
- 1991 Guilty of Love

== Dirty Harry ==
Singles

- 1988 D'Bop
- 1989 Double B

== DNM ==
Singles

- 1989 French Kiss

== E-Angel ==
Singles

- 1996 Fly Me Over the Rainbow

== Electric Shock ==
Singles

- 1988 Don't Talk About Sex

== The Executive Board ==
Singles

- 1988 I Do Anything

== Forza ==
Singles

- 1990 Viva Belgica

== Groove Reactor ==
Singles

- 1992 Magick

== Heaven is Venus ==
Singles

- 1994 Be My Drug

== Heavenly Bodies ==
Singles

- 1996 Temptation

== The Immortals ==
Studio albums

- 1994 Mortal Kombat: The Album

Singles

- 1993 Mortal Kombat
- 1994 Sonya (Go Go Go)

== Kaotix ==
Singles

- 1997 Suburban Trancemission

== Lina ==
Singles

- 1990 Beats of Love

== Lords of Acid ==
- 1991 Lust
- 1994 Voodoo-U
- 1997 Our Little Secret
- 2000 Farstucker
- 2012 Deep Chills
- 2018 Pretty in Kink

== M.N.O. ==
Singles

- 1991 God of Abraham

== Major Problem ==
Singles

- 1989 Acid Queen
- 1989 I Still Have a Dream
- 1990 Love Parasite

== Moments of Ecstasy ==
Singles

- 1988 You and Me
- 1989 Wanna Get Out!

== Mr. & Mrs. Freak ==
Singles

- 1996 Hey Hey Hey
- Party 'N' Jam

== Musical Reporters ==
Singles

- 1987 Blow Job (It's Hard to be president)

== Nasty Thoughts ==
Singles

- 1988 Acid Sex
- 1989 Rock the House

== Phantasia ==
Singles

- 1991 Violet Skies
- 1991 Inner Light

== Praga Khan ==
Studio Albums

- 1993 A Spoonful of Miracle
- 1996 Conquers Your Love
- 1998 Pragamatic
- 1999 Twenty First Century Skin
- 2000 Mutant Funk
- 2002 Freakazoids
- 2004 Electric Religion
- 2006 Soundscraper
- 2013 Soulsplitter

== Quinine ==
Studio albums

- 1995 Regrets Only

Singles

- 1996 Dreamscape

== Rhythm Kings ==
Singles

- 1989 A la Recherche du Temps Perdue
- 1989 One for the Money

== Save Sex ==
Singles

- 1987 I Don't Do a Thing

== Science Lab ==
Singles

- 1991 Flesh & Blood

== Shakti ==
Studio albums

- 1987 Demonic Forces
- 1990 Shakti

Singles

- 1988 Forbidden Dreams/The Awakening

== Subtrance ==
Singles

- 1995 Without?

== Tattoo of Pain ==
Studio Albums

- 1996 Vengeance is Mine

== Time Zone ==
Singles

- 1991 World of God
- 1991 Praise God

== Tribe 22 ==
Singles

- 1988 Aciiiiiiied - New Beat

== Wild Girls ==
Singles

- 1996 Party Time

== Zsa Zsa Deluxe ==
Studio Albums

- 1998 EigenWijs

Singles

- 1997 Lekker High
- 1997 Lekker High Remixes
- 1997 GSM Syndroom
- 1997 DeDoofPot

== Remixes ==
- White Zombie - Electric Head Pt. 1 (Satan in High Heels Mix) (credited as The Damage Twins)
- Rob Zombie - Superbeast (Porno Holocaust Mix) (credited as The Damage Twins)* Pussy

== See also ==
- Praga Khan discography
