= Lords of Acid discography =

This is the discography for Belgian post-industrial/acid house/techno band Lords of Acid.

== Studio albums ==
- 1991 Lust
- 1994 Voodoo-U
- 1997 Our Little Secret
- 2001 Farstucker
- 2012 Deep Chills
- 2018 Pretty in Kink
- 2026 Mundo Bizarro

== Compilations ==
- 1998 Heaven Is an Orgasm
- 1999 Expand Your Head
- 2001 On the Racks
- 2002 Private Parts
- 2003 Greatest T*ts
- 2016 Smoking Hot
- 2022 Beyond Booze

== Other releases ==
- 1998 [R]ejected Tracks (released as a bonus CD to the Praga Khan album Pragamatic)
- 2001 Lust ... Stript (Special instrumental edition)
- 2001 VooDoo-U ... Stript (Special instrumental edition)
- 2001 Our Little Secret ... Stript (Special instrumental edition)
- 2002 Farstucker ... Stript (Special instrumental edition)

== Singles / EPs ==
- 1988 "I Sit on Acid" - US Dance #44
- 1990 "Hey Ho!"
- 1991 "Take Control" - US Dance #4
- 1991 "Rough Sex" - US Dance #12
- 1992 "Moog Eruption" - UK Singles #62
- 1992 "A Million Colours" - US Dance #23
- 1992 "Startouchers" - UK Singles #31
- 1993 "I Must Increase My Bust" - US Dance #20
- 1993 "Running Out Of Time" - US Dance #23 - UK Singles #16
- 1994 "The Crablouse"
- 1995 "Do What You Wanna Do"
- 1996 "I Sit on Acid"
- 1997 "Rubber Doll"
- 1998 "Pussy" - US Singles #123
- 1999 "Am I Sexy?"
- 1999 "Lover"
- 2000 "Lover Boy/Lover Girl"
- 2003 "Gimme Gimme"
- 2003 "Scrood Bi U"
- 2011 "Little Mighty Rabbit"
- 2012 "Pop That Tooshie"
- 2012 "Paranormal Energy"
- 2012 "Vampire Girl"
- 2026 "Dream Boy"
- 2026 "El Mundo Esta Loco"

== Music videos ==
- "Take Control"
- "The Crablouse"
- "Acid Queen"
- "I Sit On Acid 2000"
- "Scrood Bi U"
- "Gimme Gimme"
- "Little Mighty Rabbit"
- "Pop That Tooshie"

== Motion picture soundtrack appearances ==
- 1992 Bad Lieutenant - "Lets Get High"
- 1993 Sliver - "The Most Wonderful Girl"
- 1995 Virtuosity - "Young Boys"
- 1995 Strange Days - "Drink My honey", "The Real Thing"
- 1999 The Debtors - "Pussy", "Lets Get High", "Special Moments"
- 1999 Austin Powers: The Spy Who Shagged Me - "Am I Sexy?"
- 2000 The Wog Boy - "Am I Sexy?"
- 2000 Whipped - "Am I Sexy?"
- 2002 40 Days and 40 Nights - "Spank My Booty"
- 2003 A Man Apart - "Rover Take Over"
- 2004 Paparazzi - "Sex Bomb"
- 2007 Ben X - "Glad I'm Not God", "Feed My Hungry Soul"

== Music in television ==
- 2003 Malcolm in the Middle Season 5, Episode 1: "Vegas" - "Am I Sexy?"
- 2010 Top Gear 2010 Specials, Episode 1: American Road Trip - "The Crablouse"

== Trailers ==
- 2000 Dinosaur - "The Crablouse"
- 2000 What Women Want - "Am I Sexy?"
- 2002 xXx - "Take Control"
- 2005 Chicken Little - "The Crablouse"
- 2006 Cars - "The Crablouse"
- 2010 Party Down - "Am I Sexy?"
- 2010 Sucker Punch - "The Crablouse"
