= On the Racks =

Greatest hits album by Lords of Acid
- Released: 2001
- Recorded: 1988–2000
- Label: Never Records
- Producer: Lords of Acid

Lords of Acid chronology
Farstucker (2000)	On the Racks (2001)	Private Parts (2002)

On the Racks is a hits compilation album by Belgian electronic band Lords of Acid. It contains tracks originally appearing on the band's four studio albums Lust, Voodoo-U, Our Little Secret and Farstucker but the songs are censored for the general public. Also included is the song "The Real Thing", which appeared on the soundtrack to the film Strange Days.

According to the Lords of Acid official website, this album was released in 2001 by Never Records, although according to Allmusic, On the Racks was issued in 2003 by Sanctuary Records, indicating that the album received delayed releases in different territories.

Two additional Lords of Acid hits compilations would follow this — one for Europe (Private Parts) and one for the U.S. (Greatest T*ts)

== Track listing ==
1. "Take Control"
2. "Hey Ho!"
3. "Rough Sex"
4. "Drink My Honey"
5. "Young Boys"
6. "Lover Boy/Lover Girl"
7. "Lover"
8. "Feed My Hungry Soul"
9. "Pump My Body to the Top"
10. "Sex Bomb"
11. "VooDoo-U"
12. "I Like It"
13. "I Sit on Acid"
14. "Stripper"
15. "The Real Thing"
