= Private Parts (album) =

Greatest hits album by Lords of Acid
- Released: November 10, 2002
- Recorded: 1988–2002
- Label: Fingerlicking Good
- Producer: Lords of Acid

Lords of Acid chronology
On the Racks (2001)	Private Parts (2002)	Greatest T*ts (2003)

Private Parts is a hits compilation album by Belgian electronic band Lords of Acid in 2002. Private Parts was issued by Fingerlicking Good Records in European territories only. It contains tracks originally appearing on the band's four studio albums Lust, Voodoo-U, Our Little Secret and Farstucker. All the songs on the album have been re-recorded with Deborah Ostrega's vocals (except "Crablouse" and "I Sit on Acid") Also included are three new tracks ("Gimme Gimme", "Nasty Love", and "Stoned on Love Again"), a new remix of the band's 1988 dance hit "I Sit on Acid" and the uncensored music video for "Gimme Gimme".

== Track listing ==
1. "Gimme Gimme"
2. "Fingerlickin' Good"
3. "Pussy"
4. "I Sit on Acid 2000"
5. "Rubber Doll"
6. "LSD=Truth"
7. "(A Treatise on the Practical Methods Whereby One Can) Worship the Lords"
8. "The Most Wonderful Girl"
9. "Nasty Love"
10. "Scrood Bi U"
11. "Lover"
12. "The Crablouse"
13. "Am I Sexy?"
14. "Stoned on Love Again"
15. "Let's Get High" (Rob Swift Remix)
16. "I Sit on Acid" (Original version)
