= Greatest T*ts =

Greatest hits album by Lords of Acid
- Released: 2003
- Recorded: 1988–2002
- Label: Sanctuary Records
- Producer: Lords of Acid

Lords of Acid chronology
Private Parts (2002)	Greatest T*ts (2003)	Deep Chills (2012)

Censored album cover

Professional ratings
Review scores
Source	Rating
AllMusic	3.5/5 stars

Greatest T*ts is a greatest hits compilation album by Belgian electronic band Lords of Acid and the third hits set released by the band. It contains tracks originally appearing on the band's four studio albums Lust, Voodoo-U, Our Little Secret and Farstucker and was issued in the U.S. only by Sanctuary Records.

The tracks "Gimme Gimme", "Nasty Love", and "Stoned on Love Again" were released in the U.S. for the first time with this collection, although they had appeared one year earlier on the Europe-only album Private Parts.

Like their 1994 album Voodoo-U, Greatest T*ts was released with a censored and an uncensored album cover.

Greatest T*ts contains the music video for "Gimme Gimme".

== Track listing ==
1. "Gimme Gimme"
2. "Pussy"
3. "I Sit on Acid"
4. "The Crab Louse"
5. "Am I Sexy?"
6. "Stoned on Love Again"
7. "Marijuana in Your Brain"
8. "Rough Sex"
9. "Rubber Doll"
10. "Take Control"
11. "Scrood Bi U"
12. "The Most Wonderful Girl"
13. "Do What You Wanna Do"
14. "Lover"
15. "Nasty Love"
