= Antler-Subway Records =

Antler-Subway Records is a Belgian record label based in Aarschot. Originally, Antler was the main label and Subway Records a sublabel, but in 1989 they merged to form one label specialized in all kinds of dance music. Antler was created in 1981 by Roland Beelen as a home for Belgian New wave music with bands like Siglo XX and Nacht und Nebel. Beelen was one third of the producers Morton Sherman Bellucci. Subway was the label of Maurice Engelen aka Praga Khan. In 1993 it was announced that producer Rick Rubin had created White Lbls as a sublabel of his American Recordings label, to release dance music from Antler-Subway artists.

Antler-Subway was acquired by EMI in 1995, but stayed in Aarschot until 2000.

Described as "leading Belgian dance independent" by Billboard in 2000, they were mainly active in different kinds of dance music, and were one of the main labels in the new beat and EBM genres in the late 1980s, released acts like Lords of Acid in the 1990s, and in the 2000s had success with acts like Milk Inc., Ian Van Dahl, Lasgo and Kate Ryan. For example in June 2000 they had at the same time the #1, #3 and #5 spot in the Belgian singles charts with songs by Milk Inc., Drive By Shooters and La Luna, and #8 in the album charts with Praga Khan.

== Notable releases ==
- A Split-Second, Flesh (single), 1986: one of the records that started new beat.
- Absolom
- Astroline
  - Feel the Fire, single, 1998, top 10 hit in Belgium
- Attrition, 1 album in 1988
- Belle Perez, 1999-2002, two albums and a series of singles
- Dee Dee
  - Forever, 2001 single, UK #12
- Fiocco, 1 album and 6 Flemish top 10 singles (1997-2000)
- Ian Van Dahl
  - Ace (Ian Van Dahl album), 2002 album, peaked at #7 on the UK albums chart
  - Will I?, single, UK #5
  - Castles in the Sky, UK #3
  - Lost & Found, 2004 album
- Jessy De Smet, 1 album Angel; 1999, #1 in Flanders, plus a series of singles
- Kate Ryan
  - Different, 2002 album, certified gold in Poland and Switzerland
  - Scream for More, 2002 single, top 10 in Belgium
  - UR (My Love), 2002 single
  - Désenchantée, 2002 single, top 10 in 8 European countries
  - Mon cœur résiste encore, single 2002, top 10 in Belgium and Spain
  - Libertine, 2002 single, top 10 in 5 European countries
  - Stronger, 2004 album, certified gold in Poland
  - Only If I, 2003 single, top 10 in Spain
  - The Promise You Made, single, 2004, top 10 in Belgium and Poland
  - Goodbye, 2004 single
- Klinik: 7 albums, 1987-1992
- Lasgo
  - Some Things, 2001, #30 on the UK albums charts
  - Something, 2001 single, #4 in the UK, #35 in the US
  - Alone, 2002 single, UK #7
  - Pray (Lasgo song), 2002 single, UK #17, Spain #8
- Lords of Acid:
  - Lust, 1991
  - Voodoo-U, 1994
  - Our Little Secret, 1997, reached #100 at the US Billboard 200
  - Heaven Is an Orgasm, 1998
  - Expand Your Head, 1999
  - Farstucker, 2001, reached #160 on the US Billboard 200
- Martyn Bates, 3 albums, 1988-1990
- Milk Inc., all releases between 1997 and 2006, including 4 albums and 19 top 10 singles in Flanders
- Nacht und Nebel, 1982-1985, 2 albums and the hit single Beats of Love, #3 in Belgium
- Poésie Noire: 12 albums, 1986-1991
- Praga Khan; see Praga Khan discography
- Siglo XX
- Suns of Arqa: Jaggernaut, 1989 album
- Vomito Negro, 2 albums, 1991-1992
- New Beat Take 1, Take 2 and Take 3 are three compilation albums of New Beat records released by Antler-Subway: all 3 are certified gold in Belgium.
