= Mea Fisher =

American singer

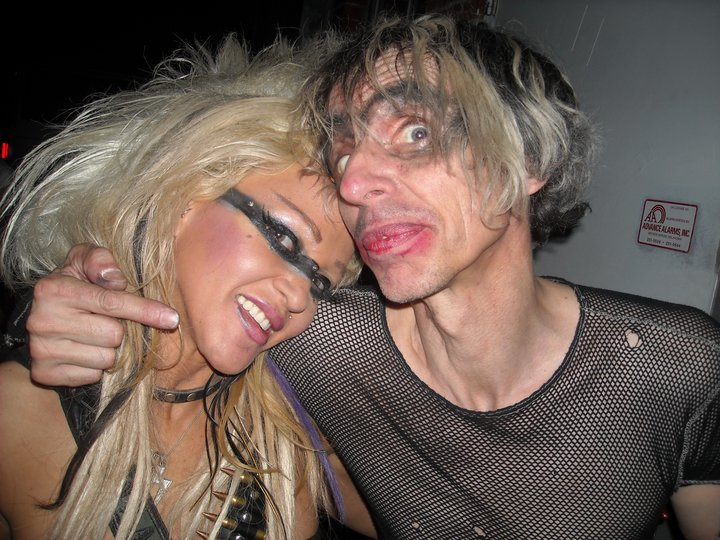
- Mea (left) with Praga Khan of Lords of Acid

Background information
- Born: Kansas City, United States
- Origin: Chicago, Illinois
- Genres: Electronica, house, industrial dance
- Occupations: Dj, Vocalist, Producer
- Years active: Around 2000-Present
- Label: After Hours

Mea Fisher aka DJ Mea is an American electronic music DJ, vocalist, and producer known for singing live vocals over her DJ sets. She gained prominence as the lead singer for the industrial rock band Lords of Acid touring and recording an album with the band.

== Musical career ==
In 2000, Fisher was working in the Chicago house scene, collaborating with producers. She performed on the Funky Tekno Tribe Tour as its only female DJ. Her first DJ mix compilation was released in 2000, under the label After Hours.

In 2008, she formed an industrial band called MeandMyMachine. She later fulfilled her role as the lead singer for electro-industrial rock band Lords of Acid, joining them on their 2011 Sonic Angel tour and Extreme Fest Tour in 2017, and providing lead vocals on their 2012 album, Deep Chills.

Shortly after the band's first tour with her as the front woman, she did a live performance at Coachella 2012 as herself, billed as “Mea” with her own live band, opening the festival both weekends where she played The Sahara Tent at the Coachella Festival,

Her first musical project for film was her part of a movie score that led to a soundtrack single to the major motion picture, “Freelancers” starring Robert Deniro, Forest Whitaker & 50 Cent released by Lionsgate Films.

She has also worked as a music producer for video games and film such as Psylab and Kung Fu Factory, having created music for games available on Xbox and PlayStation.

== Discography ==
=== Lords of Acid ===
- Deep Chills - 2012

== Personal life ==
Mea was born and raised in Kansas City, and lives in Los Angeles
