= Billy Santoro =

American gay pornographic film actor

- Born: Bill Gray; 1975 or 1976 (age 50–51)
- Education: University of Pittsburgh
- Occupation: Pornographic film actor
- Years active: 2013–present

Bill Gray, known professionally as Billy Santoro, is an American gay pornographic actor. He first began performing in gay pornographic films in 2013 as an exclusive model for Men.com, and appeared in Lucas Entertainment's first-ever bareback film alongside his then-boyfriend Seth Santoro later that year. He became a popular performer in the mid-2010s and appeared in over 200 gay pornographic films by 2017. He later became known for his controversies, including his tweets advocating for the shooting of Black people during the George Floyd protests in 2020.

== Career ==
Santoro began performing in pornographic films at age 38 and initially intended to only perform for one year. In June 2013, he signed an exclusive contract with Men.com for six months, for whom he made his debut appearance in Boy Ranch Part 1 in July 2013. In September 2013, he starred in the first bareback film for gay pornographic film studio Lucas Entertainment, which had previously exclusively made films with condoms and had spoken out against bareback films, with his then-boyfriend Seth Treston. He won the Grabby Award for Best Performer - Web in May 2014. By that year, he had performed in films for the pornographic studios MenAtPlay, Hot House, and ChaosMen. He released a 2015 calendar featuring photos of him, titled Hot Outside, in November 2014. By 2015, Santoro had performed in around 40 gay pornographic videos, including several for Kink.com. By April 2016, he began working on Leaked and Loaded, his website for homemade pornographic films. In 2017, he had appeared in over 200 pornographic scenes. He became a board member for the Adult Performance Artists Guild in April 2018 but resigned later that month, claiming that the organization did not protect pornographic film actors, specifically those who were HIV-positive.

== Personal life and public image ==
Santoro has stated that, prior to performing in pornographic films, he received a degree in business from the University of Pittsburgh. He was a one-time resident of Washington, D.C., where he was a bartender and the general manager of the EFN Lounge and Motley Bar. One year before becoming a pornographic actor, Santoro started dating fellow gay pornographic actor Seth Santoro, who previously went by the name Seth Treston, and the two later got married in 2013. The two divorced in 2017 and Seth alleged later that year on social media that Billy had been physically abusive toward him. In 2014, Str8UpGayPorn called Santoro "one of today's most in-demand, mainstream gay porn stars". Garridan P. Faxton of Fleshbot called Santoro "the hardest-working man in skin-business" in 2015 for his consistent appearances in new pornographic films. AVN called him one of "the industry's hottest performers" in 2017.

PassTheTea.com described Santoro as "a bit of a controversial figure in porn" and "a polarizing figure" in 2016. Santoro tweeted in March 2019 that he would not film pornographic videos with "someone [he had] filmed with in the past" who had "gotten fat" and that he was "not a fan of looking at [their] fat body rolling around all over Twitter", which his Twitter followers criticized as fatphobic. He called detractors of the tweet "snowflakes". Until 2020, Santoro and his husband Gage Santoro filmed pornographic videos for their OnlyFans accounts at their apartment on Oxford Street in Sydney, Australia, during the COVID-19 pandemic, where the police were called on them by neighbors at least three times for failing to social distance. The strata committee of their building unanimously voted to evict them in December 2020 for breaking a noise regulation by-law.

=== Racist tweets and faked suicide attempt ===
In response to the George Floyd protests, Santoro made a post on his Facebook account in June 2020 in which he wrote that "America ... let [its] blacks loot as a way of protest" and encouraged police officers to "shoot first". The post led to social media backlash against Santoro, who claimed in response to it that he had "lashed out full of emotional stress" due to the killing of his friend during looting in Philadelphia. Social media users then circulated other posts by Santoro, one in which he claimed that he had not experienced gay bashing from any "white, redneck Trump supporter" but had from "African American men who live in Shaw in DC", and another in which he responded to a restaurant's pro-Black Lives Matter tweet about being able to replace their property if it was destroyed during protests by tweeting that "the blacks will just breed more hatred towards them". Santoro's posts were widely criticized by social media users—including fellow gay pornographic actor Austin Wolf—as racist and his pornographic account on the subscription-based platform JustForFans was soon taken down by the company, who tweeted that what he wrote was "vile". His OnlyFans account was also deleted and he deleted his personal Twitter account. He then created a new joint Twitter account with his husband, gay pornographic actor Gage, who posted photos of Santoro sitting in a hospital bed and claimed that he had attempted suicide over the backlash.

Later that month, he variously claimed that JustForFans, gay sex toy company Fort Troff, gay pornographic studio Dominic Ford, and underwear company JJ Malibu were all continuing to support and affiliate themselves with him, to which they each responded on Twitter and stated that they had cut ties with him. In October 2020, Santoro posted a video on Twitter, claiming that his posts had been made under the influence of meth. Santoro admitted in December of that year that he had not actually attempted suicide and that he had actually been in the hospital to get an ingrown hair removed. In December 2020, Samantha Hutchinson and Stephen Brook of The Sydney Morning Herald wrote that Santoro and his husband "had gained international notoriety due to racist social comments they blamed on a meth addiction".

== Awards and nominations ==
List of awards and nominations, with award, year, category, nominated work, result, and reference shown
Award	Year	Category	Nominee(s)	Result	Ref.
Cybersocket Web Awards	2014	Best Porn Star	Himself	Nominated	
Cybersocket Web Awards	2015	Best Porn Star	Himself	Nominated	
Cybersocket Web Awards	2016	Best Porn Star	Himself	Nominated	
Cybersocket Web Awards	2016	Best Sex Scene	So You Think You Can Fuck Season 5, Round 2	Nominated	
Cybersocket Web Awards	2017	Best Porn Star	Himself	Nominated	
Cybersocket Web Awards	2017	Best Personality	Leaked and Loaded	Nominated	
Cybersocket Web Awards	2018	Best Porn Star	Himself	Nominated	
Cybersocket Web Awards	2019	JustFor.fans Model of the Year	Himself	Nominated	
Grabby Awards	2014	Best Newcomer	Himself	Nominated	
Grabby Awards	2014	Manly Man	Himself	Nominated	
Grabby Awards	2014	Web Performer of the Year	Himself	Won	
Grabby Awards	2015	Performer of the Year	Himself	Nominated	
Grabby Awards	2015	Web Performer of the Year	Himself	Won	
Grabby Awards	2016	Best Versatile Performer	Himself	Nominated	
Grabby Awards	2016	Best Group	So You Think You Can Fuck Season 5, Episode 9	Nominated	
Grabby Awards	2016	Best Group	Tahoe-Keep Me Warm	Nominated	
Grabby Awards	2016	Best Duo	An Offer He Can't Refuse	Nominated	
Grabby Awards	2016	Performer of the Year	Himself	Nominated	
Grabby Awards	2016	Hottest Flip	Runaway 3	Nominated	
Grabby Awards	2016	Hottest Rimming	Forgive Me Father 2	Nominated	
Grabby Awards	2016	Web Performer of the Year	Himself	Nominated	
Grabby Awards	2017	Best Versatile Performer	Himself	Nominated	
Grabby Awards	2017	Best Group	Brandon Wilde's First Gang Bang	Nominated	
Grabby Awards	2017	Performer of the Year	Himself	Nominated	
Grabby Awards	2017	Hottest Rimming	Silhouette	Nominated	
Grabby Awards	2017	Hottest Flip	Silhouette	Nominated	
Grabby Awards	2019	Best Versatile Performer	Himself	Nominated	
GayVN Awards	2018	Favorite Daddy	Himself	Nominated	
GayVN Awards	2018	Social Media Star	Himself	Nominated	
XBIZ Awards	2015	Gay Performer of the Year	Himself	Nominated	
