= Expand Your Head =

- The album cover features Amanda Lepore & Richard Sommers

Remix album by Lords of Acid
- Released: 27 July 1999
- Recorded: 1988–1997
- Length: 74:50
- Label: Antler-Subway Records
- Producers: Praga Khan, Oliver Adams, Jade 4 U, Carl Johansen, Lords of Acid

Lords of Acid chronology
Heaven Is an Orgasm (1998)	Expand Your Head (1999)	Farstucker (2001)

Cover of Praga Khan sampler CD
- First pressings came with a 5 track Praga Khan sample CD

Audio
- "Album" playlist on YouTube

Professional ratings
Review scores
Source	Rating
AllMusic	2.5/5 stars

Expand Your Head is a compilation album from Belgian electronic dance music band Lords of Acid consisting mostly of remixes. Three of the album's seventeen tracks were new compositions ("Am I Sexy?", "As I Am" & "Who Do You Think You Are?"). Track seventeen is an unlisted cover of Labelle's "Lady Marmalade".

First pressings came with ten stickers and a five track Praga Khan sampler CD. Several of the remixes included on Expand Your Head had been previously released on Lords of Acid singles.

== Track listing ==
No.	Title	Writer(s)	Remixed by	Length
1.	"Am I Sexy?"	Praga Khan, Jade 4 U, Carl Johansen, Oliver Adams		3:35
2.	"Lover" (Cake Mix)	Khan, Jade 4 U, Adams	KMFDM	4:17
3.	"Rough Sex" (The All Night Grinder Mix)	Adams, Van Lierop, Somora	Critter	4:48
4.	"The Crablouse" (Super Scratcher with a Golden Shower Rainbow Mix)	Khan, Jade 4 U, Adams, J.K. Magick	Luc van Acker	4:41
5.	"As I Am"	Khan, Jade 4 U, Johansen		3:01
6.	"Who Do You Think You Are?"	Khan, Jade 4 U, Johansen		3:19
7.	"I Sit on Acid" (Mickey Blotter Mix)	Van Lierop, Khan, Van Oekel, Chris Inger	Johansen	2:58
8.	"Pussy" (Pussymphony II Mix)	Khan, Jade 4 U, Adams	Chris Vrenna	8:28
9.	"Let's Get High" (Reach Out and Touch the Sky Mix)	Adams, Van Lierop, Somora	Rob Swift	3:14
10.	"Spank My Booty" (Paddles and Whipped Cream Mix)	Khan, Jade 4 U, Adams	Tipsy	3:27
11.	"Rubber Doll" (Pucker Up Sweetie and Blow Me Up Gently Mix)	Khan, Jade 4 U, Adams	Jamie Myerson	5:00
12.	"Marijuana in Your Brain" (Dope Smokin' Mix)	Khan, Jade 4 U, Adams, Magick	Robbie Hardkiss	4:41
13.	"Rough Sex" (Whip Mix)	Adams, Van Lierop, Somora	Joey Beltram	4:04
14.	"I Sit on Acid" (Satan on the Cibes Mix)	Van Lierop, Khan, Van Oekel, Inger	God Lives Underwater	4:05
15.	"Rubber Doll" (Do You Mind If We Dance Wif Yo Dates? Mix)	Khan, Jade 4 U, Adams	Frankie Bones	4:04
16.	"I Must Increase My Bust" (Detroit Hardcore Mix)	Adams, Van Lierop, Somora	Richie Hawtin	4:52
17.	"Lady Marmalade" (Unlisted bonus track)	Bob Crewe, Kenny Nolan		3:23
Total length:				74:50

Praga Khan Sampler
No.	Title	Writer(s)	Length
1.	"Supersonic Lovetoy"	Khan, Adams	3:24
2.	"Lonely"	Khan, Adams	5:33
3.	"Injected with a Poison" (Original Version)	Khan, Jade 4 U, Adams	5:03
4.	"My Mind is My Enemy"	Khan, Adams	4:12
5.	"Jazz Trippin'"	Khan, Adams	7:02
Total length:			25:14
