= Coop (artist) =

American artist (born 1968)

- Born: Chris Cooper; 1968 (age 57–58); Tulsa, Oklahoma, United States
- Occupations: Illustrator and Hot rod artist
- Movement: Lowbrow

Chris Cooper is an American illustrator and hot rod artist working from Austin, Texas best known by the name Coop. He was born in Tulsa, Oklahoma in 1968, and describes his occupation as "Insensitive Artiste." His work consists primarily of barely clothed or nude Bettie Page-style 1950s soft pornography and B-movie monsters, with the female characters often taking the role of "Devil-Women." The image most often associated with his work however is the face of a grinning devil with a smoking cigar clamped in its teeth.

In 1991, pop artist Frank Kozik convinced Coop to expand into poster art. Coop has designed posters for rock bands such as Boss Hog, White Zombie, and Rocket from the Crypt, as well as for the Reverend Horton Heat, Lords of Acid, MxPx, Green Day, Nirvana, Soundgarden and Foo Fighters. Coop has illustrated the album cover artwork for Lords of Acid's 1994 album Voodoo-U, NOFX's 1995 album I Heard They Suck Live!!, Boyd Rice's 1995 album Hatesville!, The Ramones' 1997 album We're Outta Here!, and various others. Coop has also provided cover art for numerous releases on the independent record labels Sympathy for the Record Industry and Reptilian Records. He designed the logo and most of the band merchandise (t-shirts, buttons, coffee mugs, et cetera) for the novelty rock band The Go-Nuts. He was a contributing artist to the magazine Answer Me!

Coop is an avid hot rod enthusiast and well known amongst the Kustom Kulture community. He makes an annual appearance at the Mooneyes Xmas party. He was a member of the Church of Satan during the lifetime of its founder, Anton LaVey, and created a recruitment poster for the organization.

Coop released his first book in 2001, called Devil's Advocate: The Art of Coop, which was given a 2002 Firecracker Alternative Book Award. In 2002 he released The Big Fat One, containing 1008 pages of collected sketches. In 2011 he released Idle Hands: The Art of Coop, Vol. 2. He also periodically releases self-published 'zines.

== Bibliography ==
- Cooper, Chris (2000). Devil's Advocate: The Art of Coop. Aperient Press. ISBN 978-0971237421.
- Cooper, Chris (2002). The Big Fat One: The Collected Sketchbooks of Coop. Aperient Press. ISBN 978-0971237438.
- Cooper, Chris (2011). Idle Hands: The Art of Coop, Vol. 2. Baby Tattoo Books. ISBN 978-1614040026.

== See also ==
- Lowbrow (art movement)
- Kustom Kulture
- LaVeyan Satanism
