= Private Parts =

Private Parts may refer to:

- Intimate parts, such as the human sex organs
- Private Parts (book), a 1993 autobiography by Howard Stern
  - Private Parts (1997 film), a film based on Stern's book
    - Private Parts: The Album, a soundtrack album from the film
- Private Parts (1972 film), a black comedy horror film by Paul Bartel
- Private Parts (album), a 2002 album by Lords of Acid
