= Not Strictly Rubens =

Soundtrack album by Praga Khan
- Released: 2003
- Recorded: 2003
- Genre: acid house
- Label: Okina Music Group

Praga Khan chronology
| Falling (2001) | Not Strictly Rubens (2003) |

Not Strictly Rubens is the second soundtrack album by Praga Khan. It was released in 2003 and performed by The Royal Ballet of Flanders.

== Track listing ==
1. "The Creator" – 3:49
2. "Fulfillment / Disappointement" – 4:54
3. "Female Shapes" – 2:35
4. "Revealing Women" – 2:33
5. "We Will Not" – 4:55
6. "Duet" – 5:27
7. "Receive the Light" – 5:24
8. "The Common People" – 5:41
9. "Garden of E." – 7:40
10. "The Key to the Kingdom" – 7:16
