= Heaven Is an Orgasm =

Compilation album by Lords of Acid
- Released: 1998
- Recorded: 1988–1997
- Label: Antler-Subway Records
- Producer: Praga Khan, Oliver Adams, Jade 4 U, Carl Johansen

Lords of Acid chronology
Our Little Secret (1997)	Heaven Is an Orgasm (1998)	Expand Your Head (1999)

Original, limited-edition cover

Audio
- "Album" playlist on YouTube

Professional ratings
Review scores
Source	Rating
AllMusic	4/5 stars

Heaven Is an Orgasm is a compilation album from the Belgian electronic band Lords of Acid. It consists of B-sides, outtakes and unreleased material and was originally available exclusively through Lords of Acid's website. The initial pressing of 500 copies sold out quickly, and because of popular demand for the album, it was given a wider release in 1998 by Antler-Subway Records. The re-issue of Heaven Is an Orgasm contained new cover art.

Although named similarly, "She and Mr. Jones", and "She and Mrs. Jones" are different songs. While they have the same music, and similar chorus, the lyrics are in fact different. "She and Mrs. Jones" originally appeared on the album Voodoo-U.

== Track listing ==
No.	Title	Writer(s)	Length
1.	"Superstar"	(Praga Khan, Jade 4 U, Oliver Adams)	3:54
2.	"Praise the Lords"	(Praga Khan, Jade 4 U, Oliver Adams, J.K. Magick)	4:04
3.	"Stay Awake"	(Praga Khan, Jade 4 U, Oliver Adams)	4:26
4.	"The Dude"	(Praga Khan, Jade 4 U, Oliver Adams, J.K. Magick)	3:32
5.	"Feel So Alive"	(Carl Johansen, Jade 4 U, J.K. Magick)	3:25
6.	"Orchestral Sinsations"	(Praga Khan, Oliver Adams)	4:03
7.	"Acid Queen"	(Praga Khan, Inger, Van Oekel)	5:45
8.	"The Mirror"	(Praga Khan, Jade 4 U, J.K. Magick)	4:08
9.	"Robot Love"	(Praga Khan, Jade 4 U, Oliver Adams, J.K. Magick)	4:03
10.	"Don't Kill for Love"	(Praga Khan, Jade 4 U, Oliver Adams, J.K. Magick)	3:42
11.	"Undress and Possess"	(Praga Khan, Oliver Adams)	5:19
12.	"She and Mr. Jones" (Uncensored Version)	(Praga Khan, Jade 4 U, Oliver Adams, J.K. Magick)	4:52
