= Free Your Body/Injected with a Poison =

"Free Your Body / Injected with a Poison"

Single by Praga Khan
- Released: 1991
- Recorded: 1991
- Length: 28:24
- Label: House Records

Praga Khan singles chronology
"(Kick Back for the) Rave Alarm" (1991)	"Free Your Body / Injected with a Poison" (1991)	"Injected with a Poison" (1992)

"Free Your Body" is a single written and recorded by Belgian acid house musician Praga Khan. It consists of the songs "Free Your Body" and "Injected with a Poison". Subsequent remixes of "Injected with a Poison" incorporated elements of "Free Your Body" and were released as singles.

== Track listing ==
- Belgian CD Single
1. "Free Your Body" - 5:01
2. "Injected with a Poison" - 5:55
3. "Free Your Body" - 3:31
4. "Injected with a Poison" - 3:40
- Belgian/UK/Italian Vinyl Single
1. "Free Your Body" - 5:16
2. "Injected with a Poison" - 5:22
- French CD Single
1. "Free Your Body (Original 7" Mix)" - 3:34
2. "Injected with a Poison (Original 7" Mix)" - 3:42
3. "Free Your Body (Original 12" Mix)" - 5:04
4. "Injected with a Poison (Original 12" Mix)" - 5:58
5. "Free Your Body ... Injected with a Poison (There's a Rainbow Inside My Mind) (UK Remix)" - 5:05
6. "Free Your Body ... Injected with a Poison (We Don't Need That Anymore) (Adams Groove Mix)" - 5:01
- German/French 12" Single
1. "Free Your Body (Original 12" Mix)" - 5:04
2. "Injected with a Poison (Original 12" Mix)" - 5:54
3. "Injected with a Poison (There's a Rainbow Inside Your Mind) (UK Remix)" - 5:01
4. "Injected with a Poison (We Don't Need That Anymore) (Adams Groove Mix)" - 5:01
- US CD Single
1. "Free Your Body (Injected With A Poison Mix) 5:55
2. "Free Your Body (Ultra Sonic Dance Mix)" - 5:28
3. "Kick Back for the Rave Alarm" - 5:02
4. "Free Your Body (Original Mix)" - 5:01
5. "Free Your Body (U.K. Rave Mix)" - 5:02
6. "Rave Alarm (Instrumental)" - 5:02
7. "Free Your Body (Injected with a Poison: '92 MNO Remix)" - 5:41
- US 12" Single
1. "Free Your Body (Ultra Sonic Dance Mix)" - 5:28
2. "Free Your Body (Original Mix)" - 3:30
3. "Kick Back For The Rave Alarm" - 5:02
4. "Free Your Body (UK Rave Mix)" - 5:02
5. "Free Your Body (Injected with a Poison '92 MNO Remix)" - 5:41

== Charts ==
Chart performance for "Free Your Body/Injected with a Poison"
Chart (1992)	Peak position
UK Singles (OCC)	16
