= Rave Alert =

Single by Praga Khan

from the album A Spoonful of Miracle
- Released: 1992
- Length: 24:23
- Label: Beat Box International

Praga Khan singles chronology
"Injected with a Poison" (1992)	"Rave Alert" (1992)	"Phantasia Forever" (1993)

"Rave Alert" is a song written and recorded by Belgian musician Praga Khan. It is a version of his earlier song "Rave Alarm" with additional vocals by Jade 4 U. It was featured on A Spoonful of Miracle and Conquers Your Love.

== Track listing ==
1. "Rave Alert!" (Full Alert Radio Version) – 3:46
2. "Rave Alert!" (Full Alert Mix) – 5:12
3. "Rave Alert!" (Over the Mountain Mix) – 5:11
4. "Rave Alert!" (Into the Valley Mix) – 5:09
5. "Rave Alert!" (Full Vocal Alert) – 5:05

== Charts ==
Chart performance for "Rave Alert"
Chart (1992)	Peak position
UK Singles (OCC)	39
UK Dance (Music Week)	22
UK Club Chart (Music Week)	34
