= Alana Evans =

American pornographic film actress

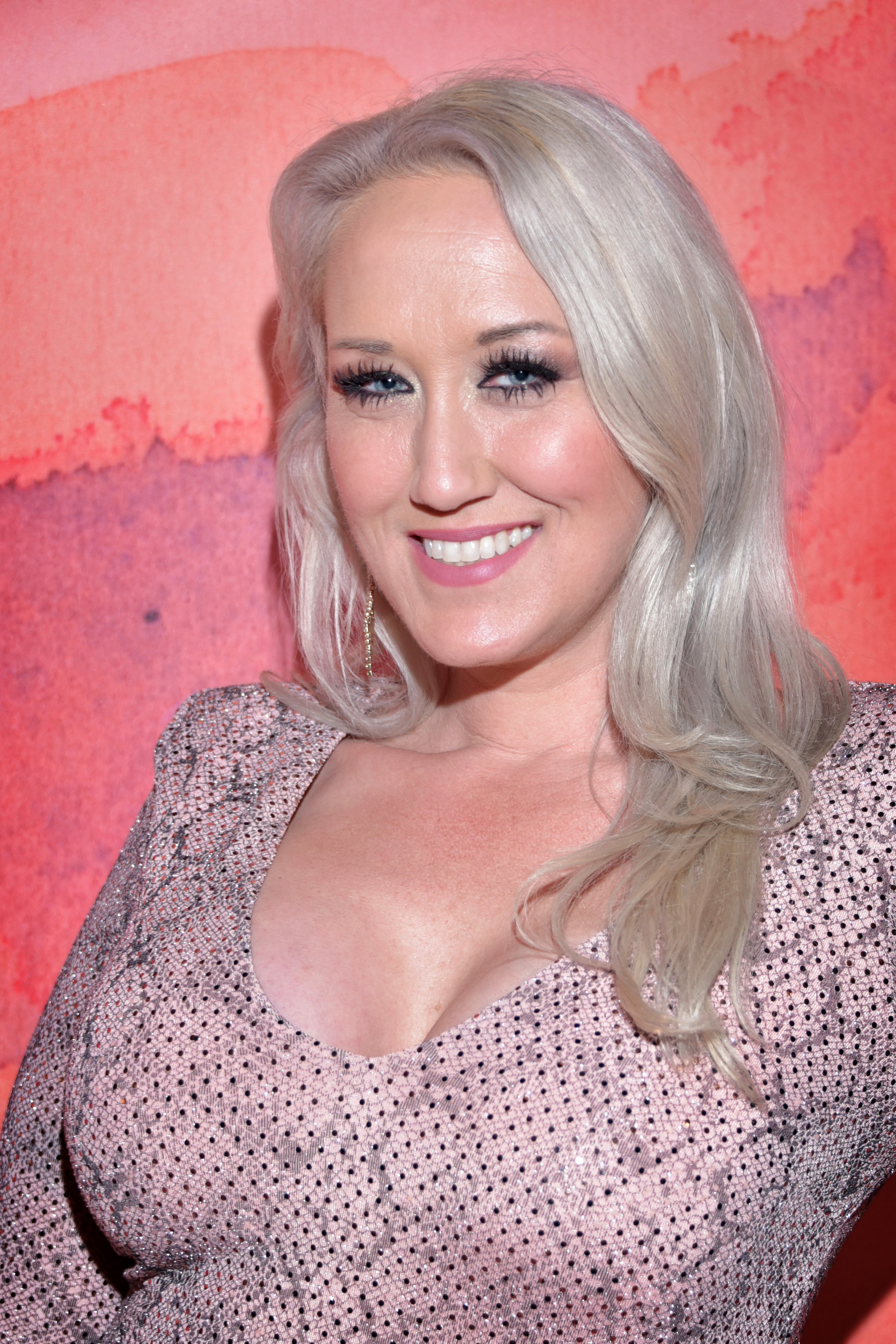
- Evans in 2019
- Other names: Jenna Talia; Superpinkninja
- Occupation: Pornographic film actress
- Height: 5 ft 5 in (1.65 m)
- Website: alanaevans.com

Alana Evans is an American pornographic film actress. She was inducted into the AVN Hall of Fame in 2015 and the XRCO Hall of Fame in 2019.

== Career ==
Alana Evans entered the sex work industry after her husband was injured in his job. She became president of the Adult Performance Artists Guild (APAG), a federally recognised union, in February 2018, having previously been vice-president before her predecessor Sean Michaels' resignation.

== Other ventures ==
In September 2006, Alana and Chris Evans created a porn production company called CreamWorks Films. The studio's first film, Pick 'Em Young, featured Alana performing with 18–21 year old new male performers that were recruited through Myspace. Alana focused on producing and casting while Chris focused on directing and editing.

In November 2008, Alana and Chris Evans launched another production company, Royalty X Films. The company's first film was Super Pink Holes.

On September 20, 2011, Evans and pornographic film actress Misti Dawn launched an interactive video gaming website called PwnedByGirls.com, which allows subscribers to play video games with porn stars via Xbox Live or on the PlayStation Network.

In 2012, Evans made her professional singing debut with the song "Pop That Tooshie", which is the lead single from the Lords of Acid album Deep Chills. In June 2014, she released a song titled "Make You Love Me."

In February 2014, Evans began writing a column titled "The Stoned Gamer" for High Times magazine.

== Awards ==
- 2002 XRCO Award – Unsung Siren
- 2007 AVN Award – Best Solo Sex Scene – Corruption
- 2015 AVN Hall of Fame
- 2019 XRCO Hall of Fame
- 2019 Urban X Hall of Fame
