= Forever (Dee Dee song) =

2001 single by Dee Dee

Single by Dee Dee
- Released: 16 July 2001
- Genre: Techno, dance-pop
- Length: 3:51
- Label: Antler-Subway
- Songwriters: Erik Vanspauwen, Christophe Chantzis, Diana Trippaers, Tommie Kidjemet
- Producers: Erik Vanspauwen, Christophe Chantzis

Dee Dee singles chronology
"Forever" (2001)	"The One" (2002)

"Forever" is a song by Belgian dance music group Dee Dee. It was released in July 2001 as a single and reached number 12 in the United Kingdom the following year.

== Track listing ==
12-inch maxi

1. "Forever" (extended version) – 6:42
2. "Forever" (Ian Van Dahl remix) – 8:08
3. "Forever" (Elijah McMillan remix) – 8:18
4. "Forever" (Perfect Sphere remix) – 7:08

== Charts ==
Chart (2001–2002)	Peak position
Australia (ARIA)	71
Austria (Ö3 Austria Top 40)	38
Belgium (Ultratop 50 Flanders)	13
Europe (Eurochart Hot 100)	51
Germany (GfK)	38
Scottish Singles Sales (Official Charts)	4
UK Singles (Official Charts)	12
UK Dance (Official Charts)	4

== Release history ==
Region	Date	Format(s)	Label(s)	Ref.
Belgium	16 July 2001	12-inch vinyl	Antler-Subway	
United Kingdom	8 July 2002	12-inch vinyl; CD; cassette	Incentive	
