= Falling (Praga Khan album) =

Soundtrack album by Praga Khan
- Released: 2000
- Genre: Acid House
- Length: 49:09
- Label: Fingerlicking Good Records

Praga Khan chronology
Falling (2000)	Not Strictly Rubens (2003)

Falling is the sixth studio album by Praga Khan and is the soundtrack to the Belgian film Falling. It was released in 2001.

== Track listing ==
1. "Falling" – 4:22
2. "Stranger in Lamastre" – 5:22
3. "Don't Wanna Loose You" – 5:12
4. "Staying" – 2:09
5. "Stargirl" – 4:00
6. "Guilt" – 3:29
7. "Sin" – 7:35
8. "Killing Time" – 3:16
9. "Choose Your Moment" – 4:30
10. "Reflections" – 3:51
11. "The Real Gun" – 1:44
12. "Rhythm" – 3:45
