= Adult Performance Artists Guild =

Sex worker's union

- Headquarters: San Fernando Valley, California, USA
- Website: apagunion.com

Adult Performance Artists Guild (APAG), formerly known as the Adult Performers Actors Guild, is an American union for sex workers involved in any aspect of the adult industry. Taking over from Sean Michaels, its president from 2018 onwards has been Alana Evans. The guild is the first federally recognized pornographic labor union in the United States. Its aims include industry-wide programs for healthcare, and retirement savings and better pay and rights for performers. APAG engages in negotiation with pornographic production companies, American lawmakers, and social media platforms.

== Structure and leadership ==
Sean Michaels served as the first president of the Adult Performers Actors Guild. In 2018, Michaels drew criticism from APAG members who saw him as reducing his participation in the union. Alana Evans was selected as the next president. She withdrew from sex work to take the role, saying that Michaels had been "blackballed" in the pornographic industry for his involvement in APAG.

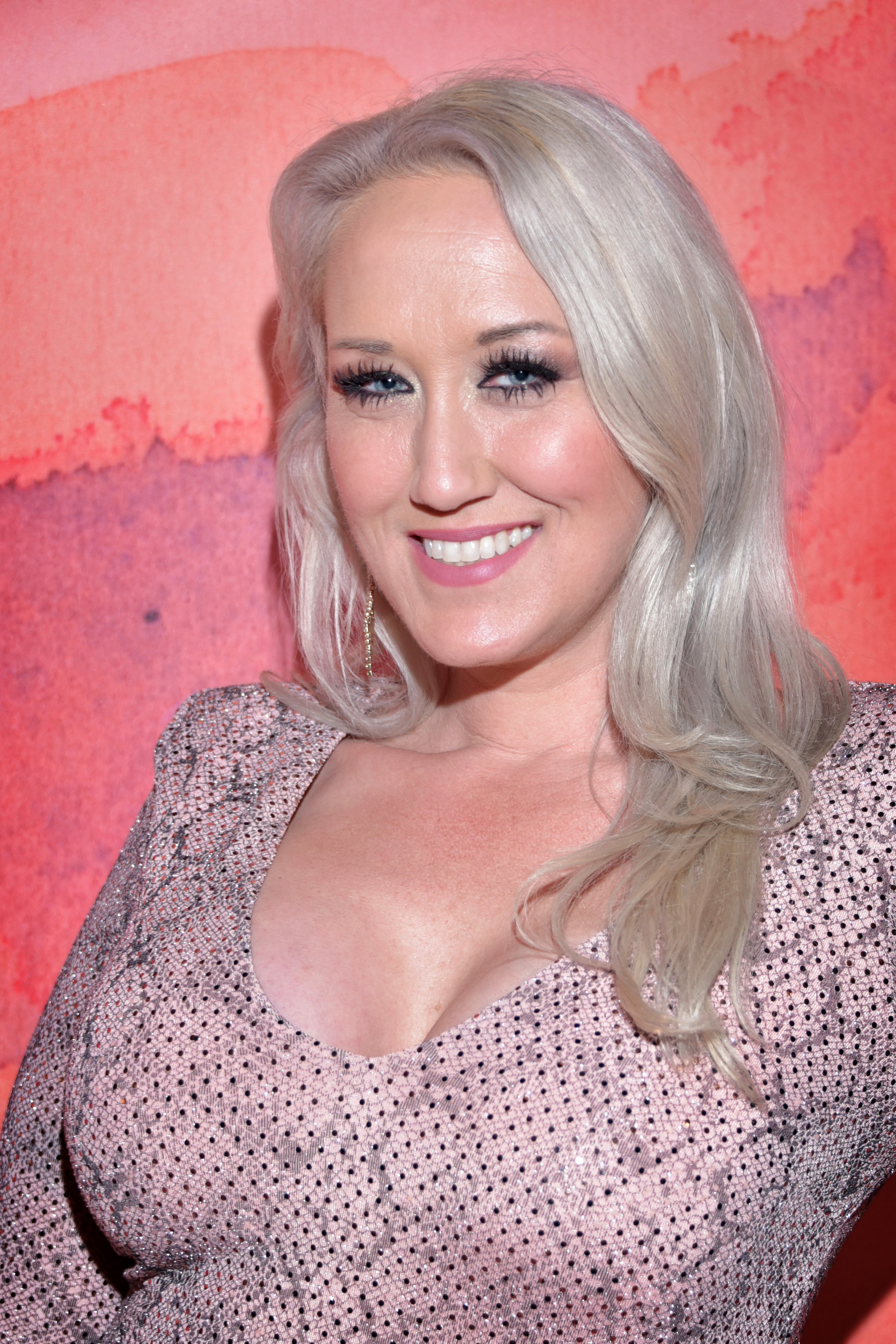
Alana Evans retired from working as a pornographic actor upon assuming presidency of APAG.

The Adult Performers Actors Guild was a subsidiary of the International Entertainment Adult Union (IEAU). In 2020, the IEAU supported for a bill that would have forced pornographic actors to get a public occupational license and give fingerprinting records to the government. Evans said that the IEAU invoked her name in promotion of the bill, without APAG's knowledge. IEAU filed with the U.S. Department of Labor to terminate APAG and recover its assets in March 2020. Evans and the other APAG officers filed a lawsuit against IEAU accusing fraud, unpaid wages and defamation. APAG changed its name to Adult Performance Artists Guild in December 2020 after separating from IEAU and going through reorganization.

In May 2021, APAG was the first pornographic labor union to be federally recognized in the United States. Evans reported their membership had risen in the aftermath from 300 to 1,300 by September 2021. Meanwhile, the IEAU decried APAG as a "guild gone rogue" that was being controlled by the Free Speech Coalition.

== Activities ==
APAG represents pornographic actors, strippers and other sex workers. They arrange contracts with pornographic companies and studios on behalf of their members, most of whom are independent contractors. The organization has a recommended performer consent checklist form, and an "on-set stewards program" wherein experienced former performers attend filming sessions. The guild supports policies of guaranteed pay, an industry healthcare scheme and a Social Security system for workers. They believe production companies should pay for performers' required STD testing.

APAG advises members on online sex work such as OnlyFans content creation. The guild negotiates with Instagram and Twitter in contesting content produced by sex workers that has been removed by the platforms. A campaign in 2019 by APAG, including a protest outside Instagram's headquarters and an open letter with 200 signatories, drew attention to 1,300 performers who said that their Instagram accounts were deleted despite not depicting nudity or sex. They drew similar attention to OnlyFans in 2020 over sex workers who said their accounts were deactivated without warning or sufficient explanation.

The guild meet with American lawmakers to consult on bills that relate to the sex industry. In 2020, they opposed the Stop Internet Sexual Exploitation Act, which was rejected. They want "occupation" to be a protected characteristic that companies cannot discriminate against, to alleviate difficulties pornographic figures have in opening bank accounts or securing housing. Evans wrote for The Daily Beast in opposition to the exclusion of sex workers from the Consolidated Appropriations Act, 2021, a stimulus payment act during the COVID-19 pandemic. In the same publication, she was critical of Mastercard's role in OnlyFans's reversed decision to ban pornography from its platform.
