= Freakazoids (album) =

Freakazoidz

Studio album by Praga Khan
- Released: 2002
- Recorded: 2002
- Length: 56:07
- Label: Antler-Subway, Fingerlicking Good Records, Never Records

Praga Khan chronology
Mutant Funk (2000)	Freakazoidz (2002)	Electric Religion (2004)

Singles from Freakazoidz
- 1. "Glamour Girl" Released: 2002; 2. "No Earthly Connection" Released: 2002; 3. "Tausend Sterne" Released: 2002

Freakazoidz is the sixth studio album by Praga Khan. It was released in 2002.

== Track listing ==
1. "Glamour Girl" – 3:20
2. "Visions of Heaven" – 5:08
3. "Kinky World" – 3:58
4. "Picture This" – 4:57
5. "Tausend Sterne" – 4:30
6. "Because of You" – 3:38
7. "Look into the Future" – 5:31
8. "Freakazoidz" – 2:55
9. "No Earthly Connection" – 6:48
10. "Skin to Skin" – 5:17
11. "Fame" – 3:14
12. "Your Lyin' Eyes" – 6:59

== Credits ==
The entire album was written, arranged and produced by Praga Khan and Oliver Adams and mixed by Oliver. The vocals were recorded by Carl S. Johansen. Belgian actress Isabelle Nouwen provides the female vocals on Glamour Girl.
