= Morton Sherman Bellucci =

Morton (Jo Casters), Sherman (Herman Gillis) and Belluci (Roland Beelen) were among the founders of the New Beat musical trend that started in Belgium and expanded to elsewhere in Western Europe in and around 1987. Combined, they released over 100 recordings under various names in less than a year during the peak of the movement.

== Aliases ==
- The Acid Kids
- The Airplane Crashers
- Balearic Beach
- Beat Professor
- Berliner Meisterschaft
- Boys & Girls At The University
- The Brotherhood Of Sleep
- The Brothers
- Bulgarka
- Chinese Ways
- The Crumbsuckers
- Danse Macabre
- Ei Mori
- Erotic Dissidents
- Explorers Of The Nile
- Freak Brothers
- Fruit Of Life
- The Hippies On LSD
- J.E.T.
- Kings Of Agreppo
- Mission Impossible
- The Moneymakers
- Mr. Horse
- New Beat Generation
- New Beat Sensation
- Opium Monks
- Probably The Best Band In The World
- Secrets Of China
- Super Nova
- Taste Of Sugar
- The Techno Bastards
- TNT Clan
- Trio Balkana
- The Vacuum Cleaners

The nickname "Morton-Sherman-Belucci" is allegedly a parody on the prolific 1980s Hi-NRG producer team of Stock, Aitken & Waterman.
