= Injected with a Poison =

1992 single by Praga Khan

Single by Lords Of Acid (labelled as Praga Khan featuring Jade 4U)

from the album A Spoonful of Miracle, Conquers Your Love and Pragamatic
- Released: 1992
- Recorded: 1992
- Genre: Hardcore; Techno; Eurodance; rave; synth-pop; dance-pop
- Length: 24:52
- Label: Beat Box International
- Songwriter(s): Olivier Jean Jacques Adams; Maurice Engelen; Cornelia Anita Van Lierop

Lords Of Acid (labelled as Praga Khan featuring Jade 4U) singles chronology
"Free Your Body/Injected with a Poison" (1992)	"Injected with a Poison" (1992)	"Rave Alert" (1992)

"Injected with a Poison" is a song written and recorded by Belgian musicians Praga Khan, Jade 4U, and Oliver Adams, who make up the Eurodance act Lords Of Acid. Various mixes of the song were featured on the albums A Spoonful of Miracle, Conquers Your Love, and Pragamatic. The song is popular at raves. The song peaked at 14 on charts in Belgium and 52 in the United Kingdom.

== Music ==
"Injected with a Poison" is an example of Belgian techno and runs at the speed of 149bpm, which is fast when compared to other songs in the genre. It is a remix of an earlier version of the song, which was released on the debut Praga Khan featuring Jade 4U single "Free Your Body/Injected with a Poison", incorporating elements of "Free Your Body" (in particular, Jade 4U's vocals).

Kat Stevens of Freaky Trigger writes that the "intense" song is "spontaneous" and "full of variety" with "at least eight things going on at any time," noting its incorporation of acid [(acid techno)] squelching, Jade 4U's "whooping" vocals, the disturbing song name vocal samples, piano breaks, as well as what she described as "an underwater electric whisk" and "one of those duck-calling kazoo things." In only four bars, each of the track's constituent parts build ups to a crescendo, before "switching over to something completely different," while the track also sporadically grounds itself with "a quick 4/4 ‘barp-barp-barp-barp’" in order for it "to get its breath back."

The vocals "Injected with a Poison" were sampled from the American televangelist Robert Schambach.

== '92 track listing ==
- Belgian 12" single
1. "Injected with a Poison (MNO Power Mix)" - 5:02
2. "Injected with a Poison (UK Groove Mix)" - 5:02
- German/UK 12" single
1. "Injected with a Poison (Adam's Power Mix)" - 5:01
2. "Injected with a Poison (Rehab Mix)" - 5:33
3. "Injected with a Poison (Radio Edit)" - 3:41
- UK CD single
1. "Injected with a Poison (Digital Orgasm Radio Remix)" - 3:53
2. "Injected with a Poison (Adam's Power Mix)" - 5:01
3. "Free Your Body" - 5:01
4. "Injected with a Poison (Original Mix)" - 5:23
5. "Injected with a Poison (Rehab Mix)" - 5:34

== '98 Track listing ==
"Injected with a Poison '98 Remixes"

Single by Praga Khan
- Released: 1998
- Recorded: 1998
- Genre: Big beat
- Length: 5:01
- Label: Never Records
- Songwriter(s): Olivier Jean Jacques Adams; Maurice Engelen; Cornelia Anita Van Lierop

Praga Khan singles chronology
"Jazz Trippin'" (1996)	"Injected with a Poison '98 Remixes" (1998)	"Lonely" (1999)

- Belgian/Singapore CD single
1. "Injected with a Poison (Pat Krimson Mix)" - 4:42
2. "Injected with a Poison (DJ Taucher Mix)" - 7:35
3. "Injected with a Poison (Space Frog's No Way Out Mix)" - 6:30
4. "Injected with a Poison (Baby Doc Remix)" - 6:11
5. "Injected with a Poison (Pragamatic Album Mix)" - 5:05
6. "Injected with a Poison (DJ Don & Svenson's Speed Garage Mix)" - 5:20
7. "Injected with a Poison (DJ Jan Mix)" - 7:25
8. "Injected with a Poison (Adams Power Mix '92)" - 5:02
9. "Injected with a Poison (Milk Incorporated Mix)" - 4:43
10. "Injected with a Poison (Damage Twins Mix)" - 6:11
- Belgian 12" single (Version 1)
1. "Injected with a Poison (DJ Taucher Mix)" - 7:35
2. "Injected with a Poison (Space Frog's No Way Out Mix)" - 6:30
3. "Injected with a Poison (DJ Jan Mix)" - 7:25
4. "Injected with a Poison (Milk Incorporated Mix)" - 4:43
- Belgian 12" single (Version 2)
1. "Injected with a Poison (Baby Doc Remix)" - 6:11
2. "Injected with a Poison (Hixxy's Hardcore Mix)" - 4:53
3. "Injected with a Poison (DJ Don & Svenson's Speed Garage Mix)" - :20
4. "Injected with a Poison (Damage Twins Mix)" - 6:11
- Belgian 12" single (Version 3)
1. "Injected with a Poison (Pat Krimson Mix)" - 4:42
2. "Injected with a Poison (Adams Power Mix) (92)" - 5:02
3. "Injected with a Poison (Pragamatic Album Mix)" - 5:05
4. "Injected with a Poison (D'Bop's Whistle & Glove Mix)" - 7:32
- Belgian "Pat Krimson Remix" single
1. "Injected with a Poison (Pat Krimson Mix)" - 3:20
2. "Injected with a Poison (Pragamatic Radio Mix)" - 3:21
- French/Australian CD single
1. "Injected with a Poison (Pat Krimson Radio Mix)" - 3:26
2. "Injected with a Poison (Milk Incorporated 7" Vocal Mix)" - 2:54
3. "Injected with a Poison (Babe Instinct's Mutan Disco Edit Mix)" - 3:22
4. "Injected with a Poison (Space Frog's No Way Out Radio Edit Mix)" - 3:50
5. "Injected with a Poison (Don & Svenson's Speed Garage Radio Edit Mix)" - 3:12
6. "Injected with a Poison (Pragamatic Radio Mix)" - 3:23
- French 12" single
1. "Injected with a Poison (Pat Krimson Mix)" - 4:49
2. "Injected with a Poison (DJ Taucher Mix)" - 7:37
3. "Injected with a Poison (Don & Svenson's Speed Garage Mix)" - 5:22
4. "Injected with a Poison (Babe Instinct's Mutan Disco Mix)" - 6:03
- US CD single
1. "Injected with a Poison (Pat Krimson Mix)" - 4:49
2. "Injected with a Poison (DJ Taucher Mix)" - 7:37
3. "Injected with a Poison (Baby Doc Remix)" - 6:14
4. "Injected with a Poison (DJ Don & Svenson's Speed Garage Mix)" - 5:21
5. "Injected with a Poison (Space Frog's No Way Out Mix)" - 6:33
6. "Injected with a Poison (Lords of Acid Sinsational Mix)" - 6:11
7. "Injected with a Poison (Milk Incorporated Mix)" - 4:43
- US 12" single
1. "Injected with a Poison (Baby Doc Remix)" - 6:14
2. "Injected with a Poison (DJ Don & Svenson's Speed Garage Mix)" - 5:21
3. "Injected with a Poison (Lords Of Acid Sinsational Mix)" - 6:11
4. "Injected with a Poison (Space Frog's No Way Out Mix)" - 6:33
- Injected with a Poison / Begin to Move
1. "Injected with a Poison (Babe Instinct's Mutant Disco Remix)" - 5:48
2. "Injected with a Poison (Danger in Progress Mix)" - 5:32
3. "Begin to Move (The Dark Zone Mix)" - 4:49
4. "Begin to Move (DJ Da Rick Remix)" - 4:30

== Charts ==
Chart performance for "Injected with a Poison"
Chart (1998–2001)	Peak position
Belgium (Ultratip Bubbling Under Flanders)	14
UK Singles (OCC)	52
