= Mutant Funk =

Album by Praga Khan

Studio album by Praga Khan
- Released: May 5, 2000
- Genre: Big beat; electronic; trip hop; acid house
- Length: 57:43
- Label: Antler-Subway, Fingerlicking Good Records, Never Records

Praga Khan chronology
Twenty First Century Skin (1999)	Mutant Funk (2000)	Freakazoids (2002)

Singles from Mutant Funk
- 1. "The Power of the Flower" Released: 2000; 2. "Sayonara Greetings" Released: 2000; 3. "Love" Released: 2000

Mutant Funk is the fifth studio album by Belgian electronic musician Praga Khan. It was released on May 5, 2000.

== Track listing ==
1. "The Power of the Flower" – 6:00
2. "Love" – 4:29
3. "Meditation" – 5:18
4. "Keep the Dream Alive" – 5:28
5. "Pittsburgh Angel" – 4:52
6. "Sayonara Greetings" – 3:55
7. "Dreamcatcher" – 4:55
8. "Turn Me On" – 3:13
9. "Northern Lights" – 6:02
10. "The Moon" – 5:30
11. "Immortal Sin" – 3:45
12. "Eyeless in El Paso" – 4:10

=== Certifications ===
Region	Certification	Certified units/sales
Belgium (BRMA)	Gold	25,000^{*}
^{*} Sales figures based on certification alone.
