= Dee Dee (band) =

Belgian dance music project

- Origin: Belgium
- Genres: Eurodance, vocal trance
- Years active: 2001–present
- Label: EMI (Netherlands)
- Members: Christophe Chantzis; Diana Trippaers; Erik Vanspauwen; Tommie Kidjemet

Dee Dee is a Belgian vocal trance and eurodance music project. The group consists of vocalist Diana Trippaers and producers Christophe Chantzis, Erik Vanspauwen & Tommie Kidjemet. Dee Dee was successful across Europe in the early 2000s with a string of trance and eurodance tracks and were most famous for "Forever", which reached number 12 on the UK Singles Chart.

== History ==
"Forever" was released on 16 July 2001 on vinyl by A&S Recordings. On 2 August 2001 it entered the Belgian dance chart at number 6. Dee Dee did their first TV performance together with the CD single release on 3 September 2001. Dee Dee spent almost 10 weeks in the official Belgian top 20. This result, combined with the amount of vinyls exported, resulted in many license offers from EMI, Ministry of Sound and Robbins Entertainment, with releases in Spain, Hungary, Italy, Germany, Australia, Italy, Denmark, the Netherlands, US and the UK. It was certified gold in Hungary, and was nominated for Best Dance Song at the International Dance Music Awards in Miami. It also reached number one on the German dance charts and just outside the top 10 on the UK Singles Chart, which was supported with a BBC Top of the Pops performance and a UK club tour.

"Forever" was followed up in 2002 with the second single called “The One". Again, this received much radio airplay, and hit number one charts worldwide. It was nominated for the "Donna Awards", at that time and was followed with a US and UK tour. 2003 saw the release of "Pour Toujours" (French version of "Forever") released with Independence Records in France. 2004 promised a full album with 17 finished tracks but they never reached release. Dee Dee disappeared from the dance scene.

The Dee Dee team decided to re-form the group, with Tommie Kidjemet leaving the team and with a new co-songwriter Shalamon Baskin (aka T-Spoon) joining the team, they decided to do worldwide collaborations as an attempt to bring Dee Dee back onto the charts. In 2009 they saw their release of "Love Will Rise Again" with German project 2 Vibez. 2009 also saw Dee Dee working with German Producer Mike Nero to create a revamped version for the classic "The One" and called it “The One 2009". Many collaborations followed. 2010 started with Dee Dee feat. Ray & Snyder "I Want You Back", and it was signed in Hungary and received a lot of radio airplay and hit the Hungarian charts. Later that year they worked with Israeli producer Roni Meller for the track "Will I Be Free?" "Will I Be Free?" even reached third place on the Eurodanceweb awards for Israel, and in 2011 producer Mike Candy did a remix for this song.

== Recent activities ==
The band started to work again in 2013, Starting with Kimura feat. Dee Dee "The Chosen", an uplifting trance track, was released worldwide on 14 December with many remixes. Hands-Up record De-Liver feat. Dee Dee "Give Me a Sign", was released February 2013. Both tracks were featured on Future Trance compilation N 65.

Other releases include Marsall Ventura feat. Dee Dee "See the Light", Dan Winter feat. Dee Dee "Yahmondana", Cold Rush feat. Dee Dee and Drew Darcy "Body Calling", Chris Von Dutch & Silver Nikan feat. Dee Dee "It's My Life", and Pinch & Dash feat Dee Dee "Show Me Love".

== Discography ==
=== Singles ===
- 2001: "Forever" – UK #12
- 2002: "The One" – UK #28
- 2004: "Pour Toujours" ("Forever" French version)
- 2009: "The One 2009" (Featuring Mike Nero)
- 2009: "Into the Night" (Featuring Parisi & Delvino)
- 2010: "Love Will Rise Again" (Featuring 2 Vibez)
- 2010: "I Want You Back" (featuring Ray & Snyder)
- 2010: "The Day After (Will I Be Free)" (Featuring Roni Meller)
- 2012: "The Chosen" (Featuring Kimura)
- 2013: "Show Me Love" (Featuring Pinch & Dash)
- 2013: "Give Me a Sign" (Featuring De-Liver)
- 2013: "It's My Life" (Featuring Van Dutch & Silver Nikan)
- 2014: "See the Light" (Featuring Marçal Ventura, Alex De Guirior & Submission DJ)
- 2016: "In My Heart" (Featuring Dreamy)
- 2016: "Yamandana" (Featuring Dan Winter & Ryan T.)
- 2016: "Time Will Tell" (Featuring Maratone)
- 2016: "Music Is Love" (Featuring Pinch & Dash)
- 2017: "Edge of Love" (Featuring Amos & Riot Night)
- 2018: "Follow the Sound" (Featuring Van Dutch & Silver Nikan)
- 2019: "Forever 2019" (Featuring Iversoon & Alex Daf)
- 2019: "Never Look Back" (Featuring Amos & Riot Night)
- 2020: "Just a Girl" (Featuring Storyteller)
