= Twenty First Century Skin =

Studio album by Praga Khan
- Released: 1999
- Recorded: 1999
- Length: 57:49
- Label: Antler-Subway, Fingerlicking Good Records, Never Records

Praga Khan chronology
Pragamatic (1998)	Twenty First Century Skin (1999)	Mutant Funk (2000)

Singles from Twenty First Century Skin
- 1. "Lonely" Released: 1999; 2. "Visions & Imaginations" Released: 1999; 3. "Breakfast in Vegas" Released: 1999

Twenty First Century Skin is the fourth studio album by Praga Khan. It was released in 1999.

== Track listing ==
1. "Breakfast in Vegas" – 6:09
2. "Isolation" – 5:41
3. "Visions & Imaginations" – 4:15
4. "Far Beyond the Sun" – 5:26
5. "What's Wrong With Me" – 4:14
6. "Lonely" – 5:33
7. "Supersonic Lovetoy" – 3:23
8. "Lady Alcohol" – 4:25
9. "Bored Out of My Mind" – 4:47
10. "Begin to Move" – 6:08
11. "One Foot in the Grave" – 4:09
12. "Adult Entertainment" – 3:34

== Charts ==
Chart performance for "Breakfast in Vegas"
Chart (1999)	Peak position
Australia (ARIA)	83
Belgium (Ultratop 50 Flanders)	34
