= Deep Chills =

Studio album by Lords of Acid
- Released: 10 April 2012
- Recorded: 2011
- Genres: Electro-industrial, electronic rock, acid techno
- Length: 1:12:06
- Labels: Lektroland, Metropolis Records, dpulse recordings
- Producer: Lords of Acid

Lords of Acid chronology
Greatest T*ts (2003)	Deep Chills (2012)	Smoking Hot (2016)

Singles from Deep Chills
- 1. "Little Mighty Rabbit" Released: 27 September 2011; 2. "Pop That Tooshie" Released: 16 March 2012; 3. "Paranormal Energy" Released: 1 May 2012

Audio
- "Album" playlist on YouTube

Deep Chills is the fifth studio album from Belgian electro-industrial band Lords of Acid. It was released on 10 April 2012 on Metropolis Records and marks the band's first studio album in 12 years. It is also their first studio album to be released on Metropolis. With the exception of Praga Khan, who founded the band, Deep Chills features an entirely new lineup from previous releases and marks the first time an American vocalist to take on vocal duties for an album.

The album features guest vocals from porn star Alana Evans on "Pop That Tooshie", as well as vocals from Zak Bagans, star of Ghost Adventures and host of Paranormal Challenge, on the track "Paranormal Energy". The collaboration with Zak Bagans has spawned a collaborative side project between Bagans and Khan titled Necrofusion. In addition, there is also a song dedicated to the official Lords of Acid fan club and online community, Children of Acid.

The album's cover art was designed by Karl Kotas and is a spoof of Cheap Thrills by Big Brother and the Holding Company.

== Production ==
The album's production was halted on 19 April 2011 when a recording session at Lords of Acid's Belgium-based recording studio was interrupted by a police raid. Neighbors had complained of "hedonistic chantings" coming from the studio. Khan and the studio staff were detained and questioned for three hours by the police. Following their release, police refused to release Khan's ID card to him until he agreed to submit to a drug test.

The album's production also took an unexpected turn during a May recording session when Khan's studio computer took on a life of its own and began writing its own music. Khan described the experience, stating "While working on a new Lords of Acid track tremendous fear shook my heart as I tried to edit a melody line on my cubase. All of a sudden it felt like the computer came to life, notes started to change position creating a new melody, completely different from the original one." He went on to say there was no way his computer could have been hacked as it was not connected to the Internet. This "ghost track" was turned into the song "Paranormal Energy".

Deep Chills is the first album to take to social media outlets asking fans what subject matter they wanted on the album. Fans were allowed to vote and name songs on polls through Facebook.

== Critical reception ==
Professional ratings
Review scores
Source	Rating
AllMusic	3.5/5 stars
PopMatters	6/10 discs
ReGen Magazine	3/5 stars
Spin	3/10

Allmusic gave the album a three and a half star rating, saying that "Deep Chills is an odd comeback, filled with that cheeky, whip-crack spirit one minute and a squeaky-clean '90s soundtrack attitude the next."

== Track listing ==
All tracks are written by Praga Khan & Erhan Kurkun, except where noted.

No.	Title	Writer(s)	Length
1.	"Little Mighty Rabbit"		4:37
2.	"Drowning in Ecstasy"		4:54
3.	"Long Johns"	Praga Khan, Glenn Engelen	4:56
4.	"Sole Sucker"	Praga Khan, Glenn Engelen	4:16
5.	"Pop That Tooshie" (featuring Alana Evans)	Praga Khan, Glenn Engelen	4:35
6.	"The Love Bus"		3:20
7.	"Children of Acid"		5:34
8.	"Hot Magma"	Praga Khan, Erhan Kurkun, Glenn Engelen	4:23
9.	"Medicine Man"		7:06
10.	"Censorship Blows"		4:33
11.	"Slip 'n Slide"		3:31
12.	"Mary, Queen of Slots"		3:10
13.	"Paranormal Energy" (featuring Zak Bagans)	Praga Khan, Glenn Engelen	4:34
14.	"Surfin' Hedgehog"		12:47

Hidden track
No.	Title	Writer(s)	Length
15.	Untitled (silence)		4:01
16.	"Paranormal Energy" (Remix)	Praga Khan, Glenn Engelen	4:52
Total length:			72:06

== Music videos ==
Three videos were officially released in support of the album. The first was "Little Mighty Rabbit", followed by "Pop That Tooshie" (both of which have "remix" videos) and finally the "banned" video "Long Johns". "Long Johns" almost didn't see a release after it was originally rejected by the Apple TV censors. It appeared on the adult video site XTube on May 15, 2013, nearly one year after the video was finished.

== Personnel ==
- Mea Fisher (a.k.a. DJ Mea) – lead vocals
- Praga Khan – keyboards, programming, backing vocals
- Virus – guitars
- Murv Douglas – bass
- Kirk Salvador – drums, e-percussion
- Glenn Engelen – additional music, arrangements
- Erhan Kurkun – additional music, arrangements
