= Farstucker =

Studio album by Lords of Acid
- Released: 27 February 2001
- Recorded: 2000
- Label: Antler-Subway Records
- Producer: Lords of Acid

Lords of Acid chronology
Expand Your Head (1999)	Farstucker (2001)	On the Racks (2001)

Farstucker Stript cover (2001)

Audio
- "Album" playlist on YouTube

Professional ratings
Review scores
Source	Rating
AllMusic	3/5 stars
PopMatters	(favorable)
Rolling Stone	(favorable)

Farstucker is the fourth studio album from Belgian electronic band Lords of Acid. It was released on February 27, 2001, on Antler-Subway Records and marks the band's full transition from the new beat sound of their earlier work to an industrial music collective, with use of more live instruments. This is the first Lords of Acid album to be released following the departure of founding member Nikkie Van Lierop (aka Jade 4 U), and the first featuring new vocalist Deborah Ostrega.

Lyrically, Lords of Acid maintain their trademark themes of sex, drugs and hedonism.

Jade 4 U provides backing vocals on "Rover Take Over".

Farstucker peaked at number 160 on the U.S. Billboard 200 chart. Like prior studio albums Lust, Voodoo-U and Our Little Secret, Farstucker was re-issued in 2002 in a "Stript" version, with all vocals removed.

The title is a spoonerism of "Starfucker".

== Track listing ==
No.	Title	Writer(s)	Length
1.	"Scrood Bi U"	Johansen, Khan	4:42
2.	"Lover Boy/Lover Girl"	Bev, Johansen, Khan	3:14
3.	"Rover Take Over"	Adams, Jade 4 U, Khan	3:37
4.	"Pain and Pleasure Concerto"	Johansen, Khan, Kurkun	1:44
5.	"Slave to Love"	Adams, Khan	3:23
6.	"Sex Bomb"	Loose, Shatter	3:33
7.	"Take Off"	Johansen, Khan	1:05
8.	"Stripper"	Adams, Khan	3:36
9.	"Lucy's Fucking Sky"	Jade 4 U, Johansen, Khan	6:26
10.	"(A Treatise on the Practical Methods Whereby One Can) Worship the Lords"	Adams, Khan	3:46
11.	"A Ride with Satan's Little Helpers"	Johansen, Khan	2:34
12.	"Feed My Hungry Soul"	Johansen, Khan	4:19
13.	"I Like It"	Bev, Johansen, Khan	2:56
14.	"Surfin' Muncheez"	DeLaLuna, Johansen, Khan	1:36
15.	"Get Up, Get High"	Adams, Khan	4:08
16.	"Dark Lover Rising"	Johansen, Khan	1:32
17.	"Kiss Eternal"	Johansen, Khan	4:28
18.	"Lick My Chakra"	Johansen, Khan	1:23
19.	"Glad I'm Not God!"	Bev, Johansen, Khan	3:33

Transworld Edition Bonus Track
No.	Title	Writer(s)	Length
20.	"Venus (Edit)"	Khan	4:20

Best Buy Edition Bonus Track
No.	Title	Writer(s)	Length
20.	"Get Up 'n Jam"	Khan	4:04

European Edition Track
No.	Title	Writer(s)	Length
4.	"I Sit on Acid (2000) a.k.a. (Live American Tour Mix)"	Adams, Jade 4 U, Khan	2:38

Special Remastered Band Edition (Released September 22, 2017)
No.	Title	Writer(s)	Length
20.	"Stripper (Praga Khan Remix)"	Adams, Khan	3:40
21.	"Venus"	Khan	5:00
22.	"Get Up 'n Jam"	Khan	4:04

== Personnel ==
- Maurice Engelen (aka Praga Khan) - Vocals, synthesizers, drum programming
- Deborah Ostrega - vocals
- Olivier Adams - synthesizers, engineering
- Wim Daans - guitars, synthesizers
- Erhan Kurkun - bass
- Kurt Liekens - drums, electronic percussion
