= SoulSplitter =

Studio album by Praga Khan
- Released: 2013
- Recorded: 2013
- Genre: Alternative dance, synthpop, acid house
- Label: Sonic Angel (under exclusive license of Universal Belgium)
- Producer: Erhan Kurkun, Praga Khan

Praga Khan chronology
| Soundscraper (2006) | SoulSplitter (2013) | MindGames (2017) |

SoulSplitter is the ninth studio album by Praga Khan. It was released in 2013.

== Track listing ==
1. "You Lift Me Higher" – 4:51
2. "We Follow the Sun" – 6:14
3. "Sometimes" – 6:25
4. "SoulSplitter" – 5:53
5. "The Girl with Crystal Hair" – 3:45
6. "Jennifer" – 6:39
7. "The Sinner" – 4:35
8. "Up Against the World" – 4:40
9. "Lemon Drops and Pixie Dreams" – 4:16
10. "I Am Your Drug (feat. Inja Van Gastel)" – 5:32
11. "Liquid Lightning" – 4:38
12. "Lady Strange" – 3:53

== Charts ==
Album charts
| Chart | Peak position |
|---|---|
| Belgian Albums (Ultratop Flanders) | 5 |
