= A Spoonful of Miracle =

Studio album by Praga Khan
- Released: 1993

Praga Khan chronology
A Spoonful of Miracle (1993)	Conquers Your Love (1996)

Singles from A Spoonful of Miracle
- 1. "Rave Alert" Released: 1992; 2. "Injected with a Poison" Released: 1992; 3. "Phantasia Forever" Released: 1993; 4. "Love Me Baby" Released: 1993

A Spoonful of Miracle is the debut studio album by Praga Khan. It was released in 1993 and is credited as Praga Khan & Jade 4 U. With the exception of the tracks "Give Me Your Lovin'", Flesh & Blood", "I Will Survive", and "Love-Peace-Freedom", all of the songs are featured on his next studio album, Conquers Your Love. The songs "Injected with a Poison", "Phantasia Forever", "Moonday", and "Love Me Baby" are different mixes than those on Conquers Your Love.

== Track listing ==
1. "Injected with a Poison" – 5:03
2. "Phantasia Forever" – 3:45
3. "I Feel Good" – 3:14
4. "Give Me Your Lovin'" – 4:26
5. "Rave Alert" – 3:56
6. "Moonday" – 3:11
7. "Travel Through Time" – 3:24
8. "God of Abraham" – 3:43
9. "Flesh & Blood" – 3:46
10. "Love Me Baby" – 3:48
11. "I Will Survive" – 3:59
12. "Love-Peace-Freedom" – 3:59
