= Pragamatic =

Studio album by Praga Khan
- Released: 1998
- Recorded: 1998
- Genre: Big beat, acid house, electronic rock, downtempo
- Length: 55:32
- Label: Fingerlicking Good Records, Never Records

Praga Khan chronology
Conquers Your Love (1996)	Pragamatic (1998)	Twenty First Century Skin (1999)

Singles from Pragamatic
- 1. "Injected with a Poison '98 Remixes" Released: 1998; 2. "Luv U Still" Released: 1998; 3. "My Mind Is My Enemy" Released: 1998

Pragamatic is the third studio album by Praga Khan. It was released in 1998 and featured a new version of "Injected with a Poison".

The Never Records pressing came packaged with a bonus disc titled [R]ejected Tracks containing four Lords of Acid tracks. The second track on this album, "Acid Queen", was originally released in 1988 under the pseudonym Major Problem.

== Track listing ==
1. "Luv U Still" – 5:28
2. "Remove the Armour" – 2:50
3. "I Want You" – 3:44
4. "Insanity" – 3:59
5. "Look at Me Now" – 4:28
6. "My Mind Is My Enemy" – 4:11
7. "Injected with a Poison" – 5:06
8. "Independence" – 4:06
9. "City of a Thousand Sins" – 6:36
10. "No Sense At All" – 7:09
11. "Stoned on Your Love" – 4:36
12. "Wasting My Time" – 3:24
- [R]ejected Tracks
1. "Undress and Possess - Part 2" – 4:54
2. "Acid Queen" – 5:44
3. "Superstar" – 3:53
4. "She and Mrs. Jones (Uncensored Version)" – 4:52
