= Electric Religion =

Studio album by Praga Khan
- Released: 19 April 2004
- Label: Stella Artois Music, Recovered
- Producer: Praga Khan, C. S. Johansen, Oliver Adams

Praga Khan chronology
Freakazoids (2002)	Electric Religion (2004)	Soundscraper (2006)

Singles from Electric Religion
- 1. "2004 (Life)" Released: 2004; 2. "Supermodel" Released: 2004; 3. "Time" Released: 2005

Electric Religion is the seventh studio album by Praga Khan. It was released in 2004 and also contained two behind the scenes videos from Praga Khan's tours.

== Track listing ==
1. "Supermodel" – 3:29
2. "Give Me a Reason" – 3:39
3. "2004 (Life)" (Extended Club Mix) – 6:33
4. "Hollywood" – 4:06
5. "Naked" – 3:40
6. "The Test of Life" – 4:26
7. "Lord, Lord, Lord" – 4:28
8. "Love and Hate" – 5:57
9. "Temptation" – 3:39
10. "Mistress of Dreams" – 5:05
11. "Time" – 4:11
12. "Sugar Sugar" – 3:24
