= Soundscraper =

Studio album by Praga Khan
- Released: 2006
- Recorded: 2006
- Label: Petrol
- Producer: Oliver Adams, Praga Khan

Praga Khan chronology
Electric Religion (2004)	Soundscraper (2006)	SoulSplitter (2013)

Singles from Soundscraper
- 1. "Right or Wrong" Released: 2006; 2. "We Fuel Our Own High" Released: 2006; 3. "Pick-Up Truck" Released: 2007

Soundscraper is the eighth studio album by Praga Khan. It was released in 2006.

== Track listing ==
1. "Heal Me" – 7:30
2. "We Fuel Our Own High" – 3:53
3. "Pick-Up Truck" – 5:38
4. "Right or Wrong" – 4:52
5. "Don't U Tell Me" – 4:29
6. "Picasso’s Dream" – 6:31
7. "Earth & Space" – 3:40
8. "United in Love" – 4:39
9. "Sweet Angel Ice" – 3:38
10. "China Lady" – 6:41
11. "You Break My Heart" – 4:22
