= Conquers Your Love =

Studio album by Praga Khan
- Released: 1996
- Label: Never Records

Praga Khan chronology
A Spoonful of Miracle (1993)	Conquers Your Love (1996)	Pragamatic (1998)

Singles from Conquers Your Love
- 1. "Gun Buck" Released: 1995; 2. "Jazz Trippin'" Released: 1996; 3. "Love Me Baby" Released: 1996

Conquers Your Love is the second studio album by Praga Khan. It was released in 1996 and featured many songs from his previous album, A Spoonful of Miracle, some of them in different mixes. The songs "Injected with a Poison", "Phantasia Forever", "Moonday", and "Love Me Baby" are different mixes than those on A Spoonful of Miracle.

== Track listing ==
Producers: Oliver Adams and Praga Khan.

No.	Title	Writer(s)	Length
1.	"Begin to Move"	JK Magick, Jade 4 U	5:08
2.	"Injected with a Poison"	Jade 4 U, Oliver Adams	5:00
3.	"Phantasia Forever"	Jade 4 U, Oliver Adams	4:48
4.	"Travel Through Time"	Jade 4 U, Oliver Adams	5:21
5.	"Love Me Baby"	Jade 4 U, Oliver Adams	3:46
6.	"Gun Buck"	JK Magick, Maurice Capillaire, Oliver Adams	6:13
7.	"Rave Alert"	Jade 4 U, Marco Rosso, Oliver Adams	3:53
8.	"I Feel Good"	Oliver Adams	3:12
9.	"Be My Drug"	JK Magick, Jade 4 U	5:58
10.	"Double Function"	Maurice Capillaire, Oliver Adams	5:37
11.	"Make My Dreams Reality"	Jade 4 U, Oliver Adams	5:39
12.	"Moonday"	Jade 4 U, Oliver Adams	4:39
13.	"Jazz Trippin'"	Jacqui Jair, Oliver Adams	7:02
14.	"God of Abraham"	Jade 4 U, Oliver Adams	4:30
