= Lust (Lords of Acid album) =

- While Natalie Delaet is featured on the cover of Lust, she had left the band prior to its recording, and none of the album's tracks feature her vocals.

Studio album by Lords of Acid
- Released: 25 October 1991
- Genres: Industrial dance, rave
- Length: 60:51
- Labels: Antler-Subway Records; Caroline Records
- Producers: Jade 4 U, Oliver Adams, Praga Khan, Agaric, Bhab, Jachri Praha

Lords of Acid chronology
Lust (1991)	Voodoo-U (1994)

Audio
- "Album" playlist on YouTube

Professional ratings
Review scores
Source	Rating
AllMusic	4.5/5 stars
Christgau’s Consumer Guide	B+
Entertainment Weekly	B
Tom Hull	B

Lust is the debut album by Belgian band Lords of Acid, released in 1991. The band had released several 12-inch singles prior to their full-length debut, and these songs ("I Sit on Acid" and "Hey Ho!") were already dance club hits.

Continuing with their outrageous sexually-explicit, always tongue-in-cheek, often humorous lyrical themes, Lust had earned positive reviews from music critics, both in and out of the dance music community. As the album's title implies, the tracks touch upon various sexually related topics, including sadism and masochism ("Rough Sex"), breast size ("I Must Increase My Bust"), sex with aliens ("Spacy Bitch") and oral and anal sex ("I Sit on Acid", whose entire lyrical content consists of the chant "I wanna sit on your face").

"The Most Wonderful Girl", an ode to self-love and masturbation, also appeared on the soundtrack to the film Sliver.

The song "Let's Get High" features samples from Bill Cosby: Himself. The track "Hey Ho!" originally contained a sample of "Heigh-Ho" from the 1937 Walt Disney film Snow White and the Seven Dwarfs; however, this sample was removed on most international releases of the album (except the original Belgian release) most likely due to copyright issues; the sample, however, would be restored in the 2017 remastered re-release.

Lust has been re-issued twice: in 1996 (three bonus tracks added, "Paris France" and "Wet Dream" and "I Sit on Acid 96 Mix") and in 2001 in a "Stript" version, which presented the entire album with all vocals removed.

== Track listing ==
Maurice Joseph François Engelen is given songwriting credit as "Somora" on tracks 1–4, 6–9, 11. He is credited under his more common pseudonym, Praga Khan, for "I Sit on Acid", and "The Wet Dream" & "Paris France" on the 1996 reissue. Jade 4 U is credited under her real name, Nikkie Van Lierop, on the original album. She is credited as Jade 4 U on "The Wet Dream" and "Paris France" on the reissue.

All tracks are written by Oliver Adams, Nikkie Van Lierop & Somora, except where noted.

No.	Title	Writer(s)	Length
1.	"Take Control"		4:41
2.	"Rough Sex"		4:51
3.	"Let's Get High"		5:16
4.	"The Most Wonderful Girl"		4:46
5.	"I Sit on Acid" (Original)	Van Lierop, Praga Khan, Harry Van Oekel, Chris Inger	5:52
6.	"Spacy Bitch"		5:32
7.	"Pump My Body to the Top"		5:08
8.	"Mixed Emotions"		4:27
9.	"Lessons in Love"		4:21
10.	"Hey Ho!"	Agaric, Bhab	4:42
11.	"I Must Increase My Bust"		4:31
12.	"I Sit on Acid" (Remix)	Van Lierop, Khan, Van Oekel, Inger	6:22
Total length:			60:51

Re-issued bonus tracks
No.	Title	Writer(s)	Length
13.	"Paris France"	Khan, Jade 4 U, Adams, J.K. Magick	3:33
14.	"The Wet Dream"	Khan, Jade 4 U, Carl S, Johansen, J.K. Magick	3:47
15.	"I Sit on Acid" (96 Mix)	Van Lierop, Khan, Van Oekel, Inger	4:24
Total length:			72:35

== Personnel ==
- Praga Khan: Vocals, Synthesizers, Programming
- Oliver Adams: Synthesizers, Programming
- Jade 4 U: Vocals, Synthesizers, Programming

== Production ==
- Produced By Jade 4 U, Oliver Adams & Praga Khan, except "Hey Ho!" by Agaric & Bhab, and "I Sit on Acid" (Remix) by Jachri Praha.
- Mixed By Oliver Adams, except "The Wet Dream" by Carl S. Johansen.
