= Our Little Secret (album) =

Studio album by Lords of Acid
- Released: 22 July 1997
- Recorded: 16 February 1997
- Label: Antler-Subway Records
- Producer: Praga Khan, Oliver Adams, Carl Johansen

Lords of Acid chronology
Voodoo-U (1994)	Our Little Secret (1997)	Heaven Is an Orgasm (1998)

Our Little Secret Stript cover

Audio
- "Album" playlist on YouTube

Professional ratings
Review scores
Source	Rating
AllMusic	3/5 stars
Pitchfork	4.8/10

Our Little Secret is the third studio album from Belgian electronic band Lords of Acid. It was released in 1997 on Antler-Subway Records. Both musically and lyrically, Lords of Acid maintain the industrial music and sexually charged songs found on their previous album Voodoo-U, but with more of a house feel. Lead vocal duties on Our Little Secret were performed by Jade 4 U. The front CD cover is a photo of a woman from the waist up, while the unfolded CD cover booklet is the completed full-body photograph which reveals an outline of a penis in her blue jeans.

Displaying the band's trademark tongue-in-cheek humor, the back cover of the album presented Our Little Secret as a live recording of a classical music concert, as presented by "The Lords of Acid Orchestra". The song titles are presented with faux, intentionally pretentious parentheticals pertaining to classical pieces.

Our Little Secret was the first Lords of Acid album to hit the U.S. Billboard 200, peaking at number 100. As was the case with their Lust and Voodoo-U albums, Our Little Secret was re-issued in 2001 as a "Stript" version, which removed all vocals. The album features one of their most recognizable hits, "Pussy".

== Reception ==
In advance of the album's release, Never Records revealed that 170,000 copies of the album had been shipped to retailers.

The album's lead single, "Rubber Doll", went into late-night rotation on some modern rock radio stations, including KTCL in Denver.

== Track listing ==
All tracks are written by Praga Khan, Jade 4 U and Oliver Adams.

No.	Title	Length
1.	"Lover (Cantata)"	3:56
2.	"Rubber Doll (Opus)"	3:14
3.	"Fingerlickin' Good"	3:46
4.	"LSD = Truth (Solo)"	4:30
5.	"Man's Best Friend"	3:14
6.	"Cybersex (Scherzo)"	4:08
7.	"Pussy (Round)"	4:05
8.	"Deep Sexy Space (Chorale)"	2:26
9.	"Doggie Tom (Overture)"	3:47
10.	"(Concerto for) Me and Myself"	4:15
11.	"Spank My Booty (Reprise)"	3:52
12.	"The Power Is Mine (Coda)"	4:22
13.	"You Belong to Me (Theme)"	4:07
14.	"Horror Movie (Hidden Track)"	4:35

2017 Special Remastered Band Edition Bonus Tracks
No.	Title	Length
14.	"Pussy (Box Banger)"	5:40
15.	"Lover (KMFDM 'Cake Mix)"	4:16
16.	"Rubber Doll (Frankie Bones)"	6:57
17.	"Horror Movie"	4:35
