= Voodoo-U =

- Voodoo-U, designed by Coop.

Studio album by Lords of Acid
- Released: 25 October 1994
- Recorded: 1991–1994
- Studio: Adams Studio
- Genre: Industrial rock, breakbeat hardcore
- Length: 49:33
- Label: Antler-Subway Records; American Recordings
- Producer: Jade 4 U, Praga Khan, Lords of Acid

Lords of Acid chronology
Lust (1991)	Voodoo-U (1994)	Our Little Secret (1997)

Censored cover

Voodoo-U Stript cover (2001)

Audio
- "Album" playlist on YouTube

Professional ratings
Review scores
Source	Rating
AllMusic	3/5 stars
Tiny Mix Tapes	5/5 stars

Voodoo-U is the second studio album from Belgian electronic band Lords of Acid. It was released in 1994 on Rick Rubin's American Recordings label.

The album's cover art was available in both a censored and uncensored version — the uncensored version featuring nude, fluorescent-orange-colored lesbian devils having a sexual orgy. All of the artwork for Voodoo-U, including both covers, was designed by American hot-rod artist Coop.

Lead vocal duties on Voodoo-U are performed by Ruth McArdle and backing vocals by Jade 4U, while some songs feature only Jade 4U. The album's first single, "The Crablouse", is an ode to pubic lice.

Voodoo-U was re-issued in 1996 with bonus tracks ("Young Boys Go To Studio 54", "Lords on 45" "Crablouse" [Van Acker Mix], "Real Thing"). The title "Lords on 45" is a play on Stars on 45, as it is a medley of Lords of Acid singles.

As was the case with Lust, Voodoo-U was re-issued in 2001 as a "Stript" version, with all vocals removed.

"Young Boys" was included in the motion picture soundtrack for Virtuosity. "The Crablouse" was played on the TV show Top Gear 2010 Specials, Episode 1: American Road Trip and was also featured in the teaser trailer for the 2011 film Sucker Punch. "Drink My Honey" is featured in the motion picture soundtrack for the 1995 film Strange Days.

== Reception ==
The album begins the band's move from the rave sounds of predecessor Lust to a heavier, industrial music style. Lyrically, the band maintains their outrageous sex-and-drugs themes. Although not as universally praised as their debut album Lust, Voodoo-U earned positive reviews from music critics. With this album, Lords of Acid ventured on their first world headlining tour with a full backing band.

== Track listing ==
No.	Title	Writer(s)	Length
1.	"Voodoo-U"	Praga Khan, Jade 4 U, Carl Johansen, J.K. Magick	3:58
2.	"The Crablouse"	Khan, Jade 4 U, Oliver Adams, Magick	4:15
3.	"She And Mrs. Jones"	Khan, Jade 4 U, Magick	4:40
4.	"Do What You Wanna Do"	Khan, Jade 4 U, Johansen, Magick	4:06
5.	"Young Boys"	Khan, Jade 4 U, Adams, Magick	3:55
6.	"Out Comes The Evil"	Khan, Jade 4 U, Magick	4:24
7.	"Mr. Machoman"	Khan, Jade 4 U, Adams, Magick	4:34
8.	"Marijuana In Your Brain"	Khan, Jade 4 U, Adams, Magick	3:57
9.	"Special Moments"	Khan, Jade 4 U, Johansen, Magick	4:04
10.	"Dirty Willy"	Khan, Jade 4 U, Adams, Magick	3:44
11.	"Drink My Honey"	Khan, Jade 4 U, Johansen, Magick	4:01
12.	"Blowing Up Your Mind"	Khan, Jade 4 U, Johansen, Magick	3:56
Total length:			49:33

Re-Issued Bonus Tracks
No.	Title	Writer(s)	Length
13.	"Young Boys Go To Studio 54"	Khan, Jade 4 U, Adams, Magick	3:27
14.	"Lords On 45"	Khan, Jade 4 U, Adams	3:55
15.	"The Crablouse (Van Acker Mix)"	Khan, Jade 4 U, Adams, Magick	4:40
16.	"The Real Thing"	Khan, Jade 4 U, Adams	3:32
Total length:			65:07

== Personnel ==
- Praga Khan: Producer, Arranged By
- Jade 4 U: Producer, Arranged By, Backing Vocals
- Ruth McArdle: Vocals
- Bart Van Huyck, Kris Dries, Luc van Acker: Guitar
- Dirk Walter & Katherine Delaney: Design
