= Lords of Acid =

Belgian/American electronic music group

- Origin: Antwerp, Belgium
- Genres: Acid house, industrial dance music, new beat, belgian techno
- Years active: 1988–present
- Labels: Lektroland, Metropolis, dpulse, American, Caroline
- Members: Praga Khan; Olivier Adams; Carla Harvey
- Past members: Ludo Camberlin; Ruth McArdle; Deborah Ostrega; Nikkie Van Lierop; DJ Mea; Erhan Kurkun; Marieke Bresseleers
- Website: lordsofacid.com

Lords of Acid is an electronic music group, originally formed in 1988 by Praga Khan, Oliver Adams, and Jade 4U. The band is known for their provocative lyrics, blending techno, acid house, and industrial music with themes of sexuality, drug use, and hedonism. Their debut album, Lust (1991), became an underground hit, establishing their signature sound.

== History ==
Lords of Acid debuted with the new beat single "I Sit on Acid" in 1988. Created by Praga Khan, Olivier Adams, and Jade 4U; their debut album, 1991's Lust (along with additional singles "Rough Sex" and "I Must Increase My Bust"). Their second album, Voodoo-U (1994), features Industrial dance music. This was followed by Our Little Secret (1997), a B-side compilation titled Heaven Is an Orgasm (1998), and a remix album titled Expand Your Head (1999). In 2000 they released a more rock-influenced fourth album titled Farstucker and in 2003, after being in the business for fifteen years, released a greatest hits album called Greatest T*ts.

Their fifth album Deep Chills was released on 10 April 2012. Tracks on the album included "Children of Acid", "Paranormal Energy" with Zak Bagans, and "Pop That Tooshie" with Alana Evans.

In 2017, Lords of Acid re-released their back catalogue of albums through Metropolis Records as Special Remastered Band Editions, the albums featured bonus tracks selected from B-sides from singles with artwork re-designed by artist/producer Jo-Z Lords. In 2018, Lords of Acid released their sixth album Pretty in Kink following a successful Kickstarter campaign.

In late November 2024, manager Marc Jordan teased the next LP saying "The album will feature vocals from a well-known American female vocalist, known for her groundbreaking stage presence and powerhouse vocals". On 3 January 2025, this was revealed to be former Butcher Babies vocalist, Carla Harvey.

Ruth McArdle died in December 2024.

Lords of Acid's soundtrack credits include Austin Powers: The Spy Who Shagged Me, Sliver, Blade,Strange Days, Bad Lieutenant, Paparazzi, Virtuosity, Sucker Punch, and Mortal Kombat.

The group have also released material under the names Digital Orgasm, Channel X, MNO and Major Problem. A single album was released as both Digital Orgasm and Channel X.

== Band members ==
=== Current members ===
- Praga Khan – keyboards, programming, backing vocals
- Olivier Adams – percussion, guitars, bass, keyboards, programming, backing vocals (studio only)
- DieTrich Thrall – live bass
- Carla Harvey - lead vocals
- Joe Letz – live drums (2026-present)

=== Key former members ===
- Erhan Kurken – guitars, bass, keyboards, programming
- Ludo Camberlin (a.k.a. Carl S. Johansen) – guitars, keyboards, programming
- Ruth McArdle (a.k.a. Lady Galore and Cherrie Blue) – vocals on Voodoo-U (died 2024)
- Deborah Ostrega – lead vocals on Farstucker and Private Parts
- Nikkie Van Lierop (a.k.a. Jade 4U and Darling Nikkie) – lead vocals, keyboards, programming
- Mea Fisher (a.k.a. DJ Méa) – lead vocals on Deep Chills
- Marieke Bresseleers – lead vocals on Pretty in Kink

=== Other contributors ===
- Zak Bagans – guest vocals
- Corina Braemt (a.k.a. Laurena) – Backing Vocals
- Hans Bruyninckx (a.k.a. Hans-X)
- Wim Daans (a.k.a. Shai de la Luna) – live keyboards, programming
- Doggy Dave – live bass (1994,1995,2018)
- Lacey Conner Sculls - live vocals 2010
- Rocco Corsari – guest vocals
- Erica Dilanjian – live backing vocals (Sextremefest tour)
- Natalie Delaet – live vocals, dancer
- Murv Douglas – live bass (Sextreme Ball, SonicAngel tour)
- Glenn Engelen – music and arrangements
- Alana Evans – guest vocals
- Inja Van Gastel – live backing vocals, keyboards, dancer
- Kurt Liekens (a.k.a. Kurt McGuinness) – drums, electronic percussion
- Virus – live guitars (SonicAngel tour)
- Joe Haze – live guitars (Sextremefest tour)
- Gigi Ricci - Live Vocals (Make Acid Great Again Tour)
- Tejo De Roeck (a.k.a. Tej-Doo) – additional keyboards and programming
- Kirk Salvador – live drums, electronic percussion (Sextreme Ball, SonicAngel Tour)
- Roland Turner – live keyboards (Sextremefest tour)
- Sin Quirin – guitars (Sextreme Ball)
- Galen Waling - live drums (2016–2026)
- Creighton Emrick - live guitars (2024–2026)
- Jack Tankersley - live guitars (2026)

== Discography ==
- Lust (1991)
- Voodoo-U (1994)
- Our Little Secret (1997)
- Farstucker (2001)
- Deep Chills (2012)
- Pretty in Kink (2018)
- Mundo Bizarro (2026)
