= Praga Khan =

Belgian electronic musician

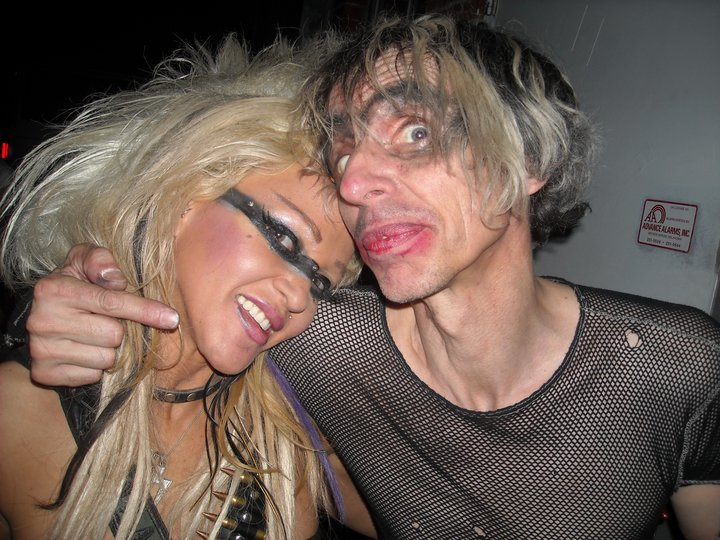
- Praga Khan (right) in 2011

Background information
- Also known as: Khan Project, Maurice Engelen, Somora
- Born: Maurice Joseph François Engelen; 7 January 1959 (age 67); Herselt, Belgium
- Genres: Hardcore techno, new beat, Belgian techno, acid house, trance, industrial dance
- Occupations: Musician, singer, songwriter, producer
- Instruments: Vocals, synthesizer
- Years active: 1980–present
- Label: SonicAngel
- Member of: Lords of Acid

Maurice Joseph François Engelen (born 7 January 1959), known by his stage name Praga Khan, is a Belgian electronic musician. Khan is considered one of the leading pioneers of the new beat/acid house/techno electronic dance music scene that originated in Belgium. Khan has also contributed to the theatrical scene with his musical collaborations in The Next Dimension and Code Red. The group mostly performs in English, but has also released singles in German (Tausend Sterne).

== Career ==
In the late 1980s, Khan teamed up with Jade 4U (Nikkie van Lierop) and Olivier Adams to form Lords of Acid and multiple other projects including Channel X and Digital Orgasm. Khan's most famous solo work is "Injected with a Poison" (1992). The single "Free Your Body / Injected with a Poison", by Praga Khan featuring Jade 4U, reached No. 16 in the UK singles chart. "Rave Alert" also charted (No. 39).

In 1992, Channel X's "Rave the Rhythm" was included in the soundtrack for Basic Instinct, after director Paul Verhoeven had by chance heard the track in a New York City disco during the shooting. After this, other tracks were included into other movies, including Sliver, Virtuosity, Strange Days and Bad Lieutenant. He also composed a music album for the video game Mortal Kombat, with Olivier Adams as The Immortals.

Khan produced three mixes of the song "Again" for the band Alice in Chains, released as B-sides on international CD singles in 1996. In the liner notes of 1999's Music Bank box set collection, Alice in Chains guitarist Jerry Cantrell said of the mixes:

This guy, Praga Khan, did three different mixes ... the second one (Trip hop Mix) had horns and strings without too many guitars or drums, which I kinda liked. Then there was [the "Tattoo of Pain Mix"], which was cool too. We put a couple out as "B" sides in Europe. Personally, I never got used to the idea that you had to give some places extra songs and not others, it should be the same for everybody as far as I'm concerned.

With the release of the CD 21st Century Skin in 1999, Khan became a major music act in his home country. The album included the singles "Breakfast in Vegas", "Luv U Still" (Pragamatic) and "Lonely". The album sold more than 25,000 copies. This earned him a place at Rock Werchter, where he performed live.

At the end of 1999, Praga Khan performed as a solo act in the United States for the first time (as an opener for Lords of Acid, with the same musicians) and released the album Mutant Funk that same year. The album rapidly climbed the charts, spending two weeks at No. 2 in the Belgian album chart. The band performed at Werchter again, this time as headliners on the big stage on the first day. This was the first Belgian act to achieve this. The album was a success and included the hits "Power of the Flower", "Sayonara Greetings" and "Love".

Praga Khan also appeared as a judge on the Belgian edition of X Factor.

In June 2010, Khan announced that the Lords of Acid project would be touring the US during July and August 2010, bringing along their friends My Life with the Thrill Kill Kult, for what was being billed as the "Sextreme Ball". Although the Lords of Acid had indicated that there was a dispute over the ownership of some of their "official" websites, Khan began using his personal and professional social media accounts, to help raise awareness of the tour.

Khan released the album SoulSplitter in 2013 and performed a concert at Ancienne Belgique (with support by Psy'Aviah) to celebrate 25 years on stage.

Khan announced via his Twitter that his 10th album MindSnatcher would be released on 31 March 2015, but the album was delayed due to the re-establishment of Praga Khan's second studio. The new album was renamed MindGames and the release date was rescheduled for 27 October 2016, but further postponements led the CD to ultimately be released on 21 May 2017.

== Discography ==
=== Studio albums ===
- A Spoonful of Miracle (1993)
- Conquers Your Love (1996)
- Pragamatic (1998)
- Twenty First Century Skin (1999)
- Mutant Funk (2000)
- Freakazoids (2002)
- Electric Religion (2004)
- Soundscraper (2006)
- SoulSplitter (2013)
- MindGames (2017)

=== Other works ===
Praga Khan has recorded material with Olivier Adams and Nikkie Van Lierop (Jade 4U), frequently simultaneously. These projects include but are not limited to Channel X, Digital Orgasm, The Immortals, Lords of Acid, MNO and 101.
