= Songs in the Key of Life Tour =

2014–15 concert tour by Stevie Wonder

- Tour by Stevie Wonder
- Location: North America
- Associated album: Songs in the Key of Life
- Start date: November 6, 2014
- End date: November 24, 2015
- Legs: 3
- No. of shows: 44
- Box office: $41.7 million

Stevie Wonder concert chronology
- Wonder Summer's Night Tour (2008–09); Songs in the Key of Life Tour (2014)

The Songs in the Key of Life Tour was a concert tour by American recording artist Stevie Wonder. The set list for the tour showcases performances of Wonder performing every song from his eighteenth studio album, Songs in the Key of Life, which coincides with the anniversary of the album's original release in September 1976.

== Setlist ==
1. "Love's in Need of Love Today"
2. "Have a Talk with God" ft Frédéric Yonnet
3. "Village Ghetto Land"
4. "Contusion"
5. "Sir Duke"
6. "I Wish"
7. "Knocks Me Off My Feet"
8. "Pastime Paradise"
9. "Summer Soft"
10. "Ordinary Pain"
11. "Saturn"
12. "Ebony Eyes"

Intermission

1. "Isn't She Lovely"
2. "Joy Inside My Tears"
3. "Black Man"
4. "All Day Sucker"
5. "Easy Goin' Evening (My Mama's Call)" ft Frédéric Yonnet
6. "Ngiculela – Es Una Historia – I Am Singing"
7. "If It's Magic"
8. "As"
9. "Another Star"
10. "Superstition"

== Tour dates ==
| Date | City | Country | Venue |
|---|---|---|---|
North America
| November 6, 2014 | New York City | United States | Madison Square Garden |
| November 9, 2014 | Washington, D.C. | United States | Verizon Center |
| November 11, 2014 | Boston | United States | TD Garden |
| November 14, 2014 | Chicago | United States | United Center |
| November 16, 2014 | Philadelphia | United States | Wells Fargo Center |
| November 20, 2014 | Auburn Hills | United States | The Palace of Auburn Hills |
| November 22, 2014 | Atlanta | United States | Philips Arena |
| November 25, 2014 | Toronto | Canada | Air Canada Centre |
| November 29, 2014 | Las Vegas | United States | MGM Grand Garden Arena |
| December 3, 2014 | Seattle | United States | Key Arena |
| December 5, 2014 | Oakland | United States | Oracle Arena |
| December 20, 2014 | Inglewood | United States | The Forum |
| March 17, 2015 | Denver | United States | Pepsi Center |
| March 20, 2015 | Houston | United States | Toyota Center |
| March 22, 2015 | Dallas | United States | American Airlines Center |
| March 24, 2015 | New Orleans | United States | Smoothie King Center |
| March 27, 2015 | Louisville | United States | KFC Yum! Center |
| March 29, 2015 | Minneapolis | United States | Target Center |
| April 1, 2015 | Columbus | United States | Schottenstein Center |
| April 4, 2015 | Austin | United States | Frank Erwin Center |
| April 7, 2015 | Nashville | United States | Bridgestone Arena |
| April 9, 2015 | Baltimore | United States | Royal Farms Arena |
| April 12, 2015 | Brooklyn | United States | Barclays Center |
| April 14, 2015 | Newark | United States | Prudential Center |
| September 30, 2015 | Montreal | Canada | Bell Centre |
| October 3, 2015 | Washington, D.C. | United States | Verizon Center |
| October 7, 2015 | Philadelphia | United States | Wells Fargo Center |
| October 9, 2015 | Toronto | Canada | Air Canada Centre |
| October 11, 2015 | Hartford | United States | XL Center |
| October 14, 2015 | Newark | United States | Prudential Center |
| October 16, 2015 | Chicago | United States | United Center |
| October 19, 2015 | Pittsburgh | United States | Consol Energy Center |
| October 23, 2015 | Kansas City | United States | Sprint Center |
| October 25, 2015 | St. Louis | United States | Scottrade Center |
| October 31, 2015 | San Antonio | United States | AT&T Center |
| November 3, 2015 | Oklahoma City | United States | Chesapeake Energy Arena |
| November 5, 2015 | Little Rock | United States | Verizon Arena |
| November 7, 2015 | Indianapolis | United States | Bankers Life Fieldhouse |
| November 10, 2015 | Knoxville | United States | Thompson–Boling Arena |
| November 14, 2015 | Charlotte | United States | Time Warner Cable Arena |
| November 17, 2015 | Charlottesville | United States | John Paul Jones Arena |
| November 19, 2015 | Buffalo | United States | First Niagara Center |
| November 21, 2015 | Detroit | United States | Joe Louis Arena |
| November 24, 2015 | New York City | United States | Madison Square Garden |

== Grossing ==
- 2014: $13.6 million from 12 shows
- 2015: $28.1 million from 34 shows
- Total: $41.7 million from 46 shows
