= Songs in the Key of Life =

1976 studio album by Stevie Wonder

Studio album by Stevie Wonder
- Released: September 28, 1976
- Recorded: 1974–1976
- Studios: Crystal Sound, Hollywood; Record Plant, Los Angeles; Record Plant, Sausalito; The Hit Factory, New York City
- Genres: R&B; soul; pop; progressive soul; soul jazz
- Length: 85:43; 104:49 (including A Something's Extra EP)
- Label: Tamla
- Producer: Stevie Wonder

Stevie Wonder chronology
Fulfillingness' First Finale (1974)	Songs in the Key of Life (1976)	Looking Back (1977)

Singles from Songs in the Key of Life
- 1. "I Wish" Released: November 24, 1976; 2. "Isn't She Lovely" Released: February 1977 (non-US single); 3. "Sir Duke" Released: March 1977; 4. "Another Star" Released: August 1977; 5. "As" Released: October 1977

Songs in the Key of Life is the eighteenth studio album by the American singer, songwriter and musician Stevie Wonder. A double album which included an extra EP, it was released on September 28, 1976, by Tamla Records, a division of Motown. The album is regarded as the culmination of Wonder's "classic period" of recording, which began in 1972 with Music of My Mind.

By 1974, Wonder was one of the most successful figures in popular music; his previous albums Music of My Mind (1972), Talking Book (1972), Innervisions (1973), and Fulfillingness' First Finale (1974) marked a long string of consecutive critical successes. However, by March 1975, Wonder seriously considered quitting the music industry and emigrating to Ghana to aid children with disabilities. Plans for a farewell concert had already begun when Wonder changed his mind and signed a new contract with Motown on August 5, 1975. This outlined a seven-year, seven-album deal, with full artistic control. This deal included $13 million up front, a potential bonus of up to $20 million, 20% of the royalties, and ownership of the publishing rights. At the time, it was the biggest recording deal in history.

Songs in the Key of Life was released as a double LP with a four-song bonus EP. It debuted at number one on the Billboard 200 chart, becoming only the third album to achieve that feat, and the first by an American artist. Both the lead single "I Wish" and follow-up single "Sir Duke" reached number one on the Billboard Hot 100. The album spent thirteen consecutive weeks at number one on the Billboard 200, becoming the album with the most weeks at number one during the year, and was the second-best-selling album of 1977 in the US. In 2005, the album was certified Diamond by the Recording Industry Association of America (RIAA), indicating sales of 5 million units for a double album.

The album won Album of the Year at the 19th Grammy Awards and is the best-selling and most critically acclaimed album of Wonder's career. It is now widely regarded as one of the greatest albums in the history of popular music, and many musicians have remarked on its influence on their own work. It was voted number 89 in Colin Larkin's All Time Top 1000 Albums and ranked number 4 on Rolling Stone's 2020 list of the "500 Greatest Albums of All Time". In 2002, the album was inducted into the Grammy Hall of Fame, and in 2005 it was inducted into the National Recording Registry by the Library of Congress, which deemed it "culturally, historically, or aesthetically significant".

== Background ==
By 1976, Stevie Wonder had become one of the most popular figures in R&B and pop music, not only in the United States, but worldwide. Within a short space of time, the albums Talking Book, Innervisions and Fulfillingness' First Finale were top five successes, with the latter two winning the Grammy Award for Album of the Year in 1974 and 1975. In 1975, Wonder became serious about quitting the music industry and emigrating to Ghana to work with handicapped children. He had expressed his anger with the way the U.S. government was running the country. A farewell concert was considered but Wonder changed his mind and signed a new contract with Motown on August 5, 1975. At the time, rival labels such as Arista and Epic were also interested in him. The contract was laid out as a seven-year, seven-album, $37 million deal ($221,382,189 in 2025 dollars) and gave Wonder full artistic control, making this the largest deal made with a recording star up to that point. Shortly after signing the contract, Wonder took a year off from music.

There was huge anticipation for the new album, which was initially scheduled for release around October 1975. It was delayed when Wonder felt that further remixing was essential. According to him, Motown's marketing campaign decided to take advantage of the delay by producing "We're almost finished" T-shirts. Work on the new album continued into early 1976. The working title was Let's See Life the Way It Is, before Wonder settled on Songs in the Key of Life. The title would represent the formula of a complex "key of life" and the proposals for indefinite success. After a two-year wait, the album was released on September 28, 1976, as an augmented double LP with a bonus 7-inch EP titled A Something's Extra (featuring "Saturn", "Ebony Eyes", "All Day Sucker", and "Easy Goin' Evening (My Mama's Call)"), and a 24-page lyric and credit booklet.

== Recording ==
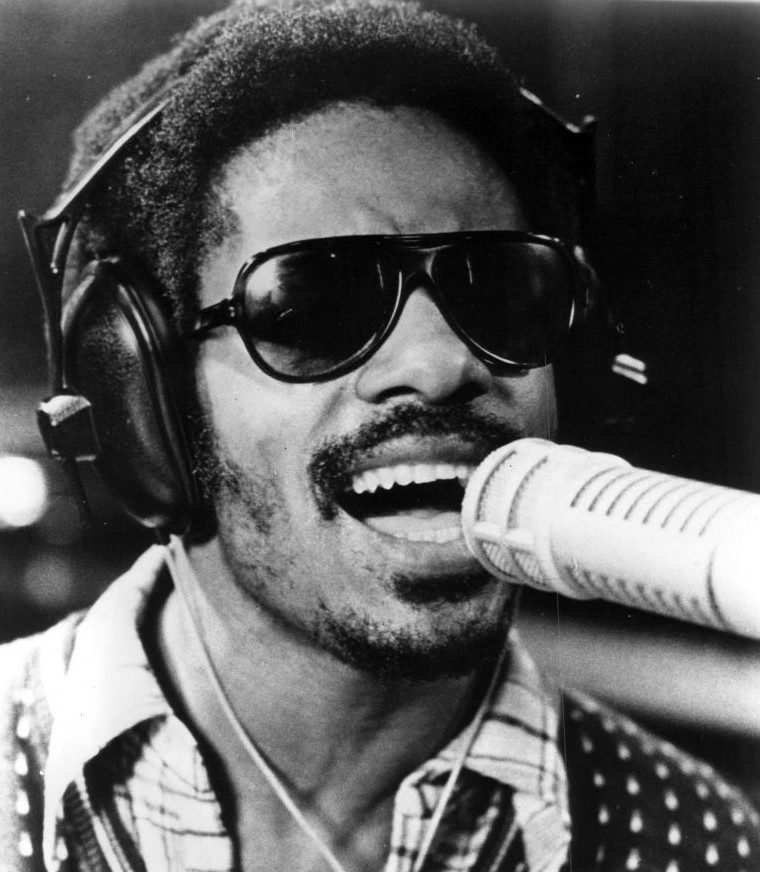
Wonder used an Electro-Voice RE20 microphone (pictured) to record his voice for upbeat songs such as "I Wish". A variety of microphones was used for other songs.

It was recorded primarily at Crystal Sound studio in Hollywood, with some sessions recorded at the Record Plant studios in Hollywood and Sausalito; final mixing was conducted at Crystal Sound. During a period when Crystal Sounds had a prior obligation to record another artist, the production team traveled to the Hit Factory in New York City to work for about six weeks, but only used one basic track from those sessions. As a perfectionist, Wonder spent long hours in the studio for almost every track he recorded. He was "not eating or sleeping, while everyone around him struggled to keep up." According to Wonder, "If my flow is goin', I keep on until I peak." Bassist Nathan Watts remembered getting home at 3 am after very long hours in the studio, only to have Wonder phone to request him return immediately to help with "I Wish".

A total of 130 people worked on the album, but Wonder's artistic vision remains evident. Among the musicians who contributed were Herbie Hancock who played Fender Rhodes on "As", George Benson who played electric guitar on "Another Star", and Minnie Riperton and Deniece Williams who added backing vocals on "Ordinary Pain". Michael Sembello appears throughout the album, playing guitar on several tracks and also co-writing "Saturn" with Wonder. While Wonder wrote most of the songs on the album himself, some of the album's most socially-conscious songs had co-writers. Wonder wrote "Village Ghetto Land" and "Black Man" with Gary Byrd, and he wrote "Have a Talk with God" with his brother Calvin Hardaway.

== Composition ==
Songs in the Key of Life is an augmented double album with 17 songs. The themes are varied, and include religious beliefs, love, romance, nostalgia, parenthood, inequality, music as a language and racial discrimination. Wonder played, wrote and arranged the majority of the album. "Love's in Need of Love Today" opens the album with critiques in society and with instrumentation made by Wonder and Eddie 'Bongo' Brown. The album encompassed a large range of genres including funk, jazz, R&B, progressive soul, classical (notably the synthesized string arrangement in "Village Ghetto Land") and pop.

== Critical reception ==
Professional ratings
Review scores
Source	Rating
AllMusic	5/5 stars
Christgau's Record Guide	A
Encyclopedia of Popular Music	4/5 stars
The Great Rock Discography	8/10
MusicHound R&B	5/5 stars
Pitchfork	10/10
Rolling Stone	5/5 stars
The Rolling Stone Album Guide	5/5 stars

At the time of the album's release, reporters and music critics, and everyone who had worked on it, traveled to Long View Farm, a recording studio in Massachusetts, for a press preview. Everybody received autographed copies of the album and Wonder gave interviews. Critical reception was immediately positive. The album was viewed as a guided tour through a wide range of musical styles and the life and feelings of the artist. It included recollections of childhood, of first love and lost love. It contained songs about faith and love among all peoples and songs about social justice for the poor and downtrodden. In The Village Voice's annual Pazz & Jop critics poll, it was voted as the best album of the year.

From 1973, Wonder's presence at the Grammy Awards ceremonies was consistent – he attended most of the ceremonies and also often performed on stage – but in 1976 he did not attend and was not nominated for any awards, as he had not released any new material during the previous year. When Paul Simon accepted the award for Album of the Year at the 18th Grammy Awards (for Still Crazy After All These Years), he jokingly thanked Stevie for not releasing an album that year, as Wonder had won the award at the two preceding ceremonies (for Innervisions and Fulfillingness' First Finale). When, a year later, Wonder was again nominated in the category for Songs in the Key of Life (which also received six other nominations), the album was seen as the favorite by many critics to take the award. The other nominees were Breezin' by George Benson, Chicago X by Chicago, Silk Degrees by Boz Scaggs, and the other favorite, Peter Frampton’s Frampton Comes Alive!, which was also a huge critical and commercial success.

Wonder was again absent from the 19th Grammy Awards ceremony, as he was visiting Africa. In February 1977, he traveled to Nigeria for two weeks, primarily to explore his musical heritage, as he put it. A satellite hook-up was arranged so he could accept his Grammys from across the sea, but when Bette Midler announced the results during the ceremony, the audience was only able to see Wonder at a phone smiling and giving thanks, as the video signal was poor and the audio inaudible. Andy Williams went on to make a public blunder when he asked the blind-since-six-weeks-old Wonder, "Stevie, can you see us?" In all, Wonder won in four out of the seven categories in which he was nominated at the Grammys that year: Album of the Year, Producer of the Year, Best Male Pop Vocal Performance, and Best Male R&B Vocal Performance (for "I Wish").

== Commercial performance ==
Highly anticipated, the album surpassed all commercial expectations. It debuted at number 1 on the Billboard Pop Albums Chart on October 8, 1976, becoming only the third album in history to achieve that feat (after British singer/composer Elton John's albums Captain Fantastic and the Brown Dirt Cowboy and Rock of the Westies, both from 1975), and the first by an American artist. In Canada, it achieved the same feat, entering the RPM national albums chart at number one on October 16. The album spent thirteen consecutive weeks at number one in the US, eleven of which were in 1976, making it the album with the most weeks at number one during that year. During those eleven weeks, Songs in the Key of Life managed to block four other albums from reaching the top: Boz Scaggs’s Silk Degrees, Earth, Wind & Fire's Spirit, Led Zeppelin's soundtrack for The Song Remains the Same and Rod Stewart's A Night on the Town. On January 15, 1977, the album finally dropped to number two behind Eagles' Hotel California, and it fell to number four the following week, but on January 29 it returned to the top for a fourteenth and final week. By the end of its run, it had spent 35 weeks inside the top ten of the Billboard albums chart and was on the chart for a total of 80 weeks. The album also saw longevity atop the Billboard R&B/Black Albums chart, spending 20 non-consecutive weeks at number one.

The album became the second-best selling album of 1977 in the US (behind only Fleetwood Mac's blockbuster Rumours), and was the highest-selling R&B/Soul album on the Billboard Year-End chart that same year. It was certified Diamond by the RIAA in 2005, indicating sales of 5 million copies in the US alone (though a Diamond certification is awarded for sales of 10 million units, the RIAA counts each individual record or disc included with an album as a separate unit).

Songs in the Key of Life was also the most successful of Wonder's albums in terms of singles, the first of which, the upbeat "I Wish", was released in November 1976, more than a month after the album was released. On January 15, 1977, the song reached number one on the Billboard R&B chart, where it spent five weeks. Seven days after, it also reached the summit of the Billboard Hot 100, although it spent only one week at number one. The track became an international top 10 single, and reached number five in the UK. "I Wish" became one of Wonder's standards and remains one of his most sampled songs. The follow-up single, the jazzy "Sir Duke", was released in March 1977 and surpassed the commercial success of "I Wish". It also reached number one on the Billboard Hot 100 (where it spent three weeks, starting on May 21) and the R&B chart (for one week, starting on May 28), but it reached number two in the UK, where it was kept from the top spot by the song "Free" by Deniece Williams, who provided backing vocals on Wonder's album.

Released during the second half of 1977, as sales for the album began to decline, the last two singles from Songs in the Key of Life failed to match the success of "I Wish" and "Sir Duke". "Another Star" was released in August and reached number 32 on the Hot 100 (number 18 on the R&B chart, and number 29 in the UK), and "As" came out two months later, peaking at number 36 on both the Pop and R&B charts. Though not released as a single, "Isn't She Lovely" received wide radio airplay and became one of Wonder's most popular songs. David Parton's cover of the song, recorded and released soon after Wonder's album, gave him a top 10 hit in the UK in early 1977.

== Legacy and influence ==
Over time, Songs in the Key of Life became a standard, and it is considered Wonder's signature album, even by Wonder himself: "Of all the albums," he told Q magazine for their April 1995 issue, "Songs in the Key of Life I'm most happy about. Just the time, being alive then. To be a father and then… letting go and letting God give me the energy and strength I needed." It has been cited as one of the greatest albums in popular music history. For example, in 2001, the TV network VH1 named it the seventh greatest album of all time; in 2003, it was ranked number 56 on Rolling Stone Magazine's list of the 500 greatest albums of all time (it was number 57 on the 2012 version of the list, and number 4 on the 2020 edition); it was included in the book 1001 Albums You Must Hear Before You Die; and in April 2008, it was voted the "Top Album of All Time" by the Yahoo! Music Playlist Blog, using a formula that combined four parameters – "Album Staying Power Value + Sales Value + Critical Rating Value + Grammy Award Value".

Many musicians have remarked on the quality of the album and its influence on their own work. Elton John said, in his notes about Wonder for Rolling Stone's 2003 list of "The Immortals – The Greatest Artists of All Time" (in which Wonder was ranked number 15): "Let me put it this way: wherever I go in the world, I always take a copy of Songs in the Key of Life. For me, it's the best album ever made, and I'm always left in awe after I listen to it." In an interview with Ebony magazine, Michael Jackson called Songs in the Key of Life his favorite Stevie Wonder album. George Michael cited the album as his favorite of all time. He released a live recording of "Love's in Need of Love Today" as a B-side to "Father Figure" in 1987 and performed the song on his Faith tour the next year, performed "Village Ghetto Land" at the Nelson Mandela 70th Birthday Tribute in 1988, covered "Pastime Paradise" and "Knocks Me Off My Feet" on his 1991 Cover to Cover tour, and (with Mary J. Blige) had a hit single in 1999 with a cover of "As".

Many R&B singers have praised the album: Mariah Carey generally names it as one of her favorites, and Whitney Houston remarked on its influence on her singing (at Houston's request, the album was played throughout the photo sessions for her compilation album Whitney: The Greatest Hits, as can be seen on the home video release that accompanied that album). Its influence has even been felt by heavy metal musicians. Gene Hoglan, drummer for Dark Angel, has credited Stevie Wonder with creating the blast beat, while Mastodon drummer Brann Dalor has cited Wonder has a major influence on him. Pantera singer Phil Anselmo describing a live performance of Songs in the Key of Life as "a living, breathing miracle".

The album's tracks have provided numerous samples for rap and hip-hop artists. "Pastime Paradise" was reworked by Coolio as "Gangsta's Paradise" in 1995. That same year, smooth jazz artist Najee recorded a cover album titled Najee Plays Songs from the Key of Life, which is based entirely on Wonder's album. In 1999, Will Smith used "I Wish" as the base for his US number-one single "Wild Wild West" (Smith's song repeated the main melody of "I Wish" as a riff and re-formed some of Wonder's lyrics).

In December 2013, Wonder did a live concert performance of the entire album at the Nokia Theater in Los Angeles. The event was his 18th annual House Full of Toys Benefit Concert, and featured some of the singers and musicians who are featured on the original album, as well as several from the contemporary music scene. Then, in November 2014, Wonder began performing the entire album in a series of concert dates in the US and Canada. The start of the tour coincided with the 38th anniversary of the release of Songs in the Key of Life.

In September 2026, Wonder announced a tour celebrating the 50th Anniversary of the album's release. During each date of the tour, the album will be played in its entirety. According to the Rolling Stone press release, the tour is scheduled to begin in Birmingham, U.K. on October 13, 2026 kicking off the European leg through November 12th. A U.S. leg will follow beginning November 19th in New York before finishing in Los Angeles on December 19th. On September 28th, the 50th anniversary of the album's release, Songs in the Key of Life – The EP was surprise released, consisting of four outtakes from the original album sessions: "It's Easier," "My Life Story of Love," "I Can See the Sun in Late December" and "I'm Into Livin'". Wonder stated in a press release: "We didn’t add these songs to the album, but they were part of what I was feeling and discovering as we made it. They bring me back to that time in my life, and now they get to become part of yours."

== Track listing ==
=== Original release ===
All tracks are written by Stevie Wonder, unless otherwise noted.

Side one
No.	Title	Writer(s)	Length
1.	"Love's in Need of Love Today"		7:06
2.	"Have a Talk with God"	Wonder; Calvin Hardaway	2:42
3.	"Village Ghetto Land"	Wonder; Gary Byrd	3:25
4.	"Contusion" (instrumental)		3:46
5.	"Sir Duke"		3:52
Total length:			20:51

Side two
No.	Title	Length
1.	"I Wish"	4:12
2.	"Knocks Me Off My Feet"	3:36
3.	"Pastime Paradise"	3:27
4.	"Summer Soft"	4:14
5.	"Ordinary Pain"	6:16
Total length:		21:45

Side three
No.	Title	Writer(s)	Length
1.	"Isn't She Lovely"		6:34
2.	"Joy Inside My Tears"		6:30
3.	"Black Man"	Wonder; Byrd	8:27
Total length:			21:31

Side four
No.	Title	Length
1.	"Ngiculela – Es Una Historia – I Am Singing" (translation by Thoko Mdalose Hall, Raymond Maldonado)	3:48
2.	"If It's Magic"	3:12
3.	"As"	7:08
4.	"Another Star"	8:28
Total length:		22:16

=== A Something's Extra ===
Original LP editions included a bonus 7-inch EP, titled A Something's Extra, containing four bonus tracks. These songs were later included as bonus tracks on CD and streaming versions of the album.

Initial CD reissues (1984 to 1997) have a slightly altered running order, with two bonus tracks per disc. Disc one ends with "Saturn" and "Ebony Eyes", while disc two ends with "All Day Sucker" and "Easy Goin' Evening". CD reissues from 2000 to the present day now contain all four bonus tracks at the end of disc two, thus reverting to the original running order of the 1976 2×LP+7-inch first edition issue.

Side one
No.	Title	Writer(s)	Length
1.	"Saturn"	Wonder; Michael Sembello	4:54
2.	"Ebony Eyes"		4:11
Total length:			9:05

Side two
No.	Title	Length
1.	"All Day Sucker"	5:06
2.	"Easy Goin' Evening (My Mama's Call)" (instrumental)	3:55
Total length:		9:01

=== Songs in the Key of Life 50th Anniversary – The EP ===
On September 28, 2026, exactly 50 years after the album's original release, Wonder released Songs in the Key of Life – The EP, containing four previously unreleased songs recorded during the album's sessions. The EP was released ahead of Wonder performing Songs in the Key of Life in full on an arena tour in Europe and the US, beginning in Birmingham on October 13, 2026. The tour continues across Europe before returning to the UK followed by five US cities: New York City, Chicago, Washington, D.C., Detroit and Los Angeles.

All tracks are written by Stevie Wonder, except where noted.

No.	Title	Writer(s)	Length
1.	"It's Easier"		5:09
2.	"My Life Story of Love"	Wonder; Susaye Greene	3:58
3.	"I Can See the Sun in Late December"		4:37
4.	"I'm Into Livin'"		5:44
Total length:			19:28

== Personnel ==
Credits adapted from Songs in the Key of Life liner notes.

- Stevie Wonder – lead vocals (A1–A3, A5–F1), backing vocals, harmonica, keyboards, synth bass, drums, percussion, handclaps, arrangement, producer
- Al Fann Theatrical Ensemble – verbal replies (C3)
- George Benson – backing vocals, guitar (D4)
- Shirley Brewer – additional backing vocals (A4, B5), handclaps (C1), percussion (D1)
- Carolyn Dennis – backing vocals (F1)
- Michael Gray – backing vocals (B3, additional on A4)
- Susaye Greene – backing vocals (C2)
- Renee Hardaway – backing vocals (B1), percussion (D1)
- Hare Krishna (Choir) – backing vocals (B3)
- Terry Hendricks – backing vocals (B5)
- Josie James – backing vocals (D4, additional on A4)
- Madelaine "Gypsy" Jones – backing vocals (B5)
- Lynda Laurence – backing vocals (B5)
- Artece May – additional backing vocals (A4), handclaps (C1)
- Charity McCrary – backing vocals (B5)
- Linda McCrary – backing vocals (B5)
- Minnie Riperton – backing vocals (B5)
- Sundray Tucker – backing vocals (B5), handclaps (C1)
- West Angeles Church of God Choir – backing vocals (B3)
- Mary Lee Whitney – backing vocals (B5, D3)
- Deniece Williams – backing vocals (B5)
- Wonderlove – background vocal group (A4)
- Syreeta Wright – backing vocals (B5)
- Brenda Barrett – handclaps (C1)
- Colleen Carleton – handclaps (C1)
- Carole Cole – handclaps (C1)
- Nelson Hayes – handclaps (C1)
- Dave Henson – handclaps (C1, D3)
- Edna Orso – handclaps (C1)
- Yolanda Simmons – handclaps (D3)
- Josette Valentino – handclaps (C1, D3), percussion (D1)
- Nathan Alford, Jr. – percussion (D4)
- Charles Brewer – percussion (D1)
- Eddie "Bongo" Brown – collinga-style percussion (A1)
- John Fischbach – percussion (D1)
- Carmello Hungria Garcia – timbales (D4)
- Bobbye Hall – cuíca, percussion (B3)
- Nelson Hayes – percussion (D1), handclaps (C1)
- Nastee Latimer – percussion (B4)
- Amale Mathews – percussion (D1)
- Marietta Waters – percussion (D1)
- Greg Brown – drums (D3)
- Raymond Pounds – drums (A4–B1)
- Ben Bridges – rhythm guitar (A4, A5, B4, E1, F1)
- Peter "Sneaky Pete" Kleinow – steel guitar (E2)
- Dean Parks – guitar (D3)
- Michael Sembello – lead guitar (A4, A5, B5, E1), rhythm guitar (F1)
- W. G. Snuffy Walden – lead guitar (F1)
- Nathan Watts – bass guitar (A4–B1, D3, D4, E2, F2), percussion (D1), handclaps (D3)
- Ronnie Foster – organ (B4)
- Herbie Hancock – keyboards, handclaps (D3)
- Greg Phillinganes – keyboards (A4, C1, C2, E1)
- Stephen St. Croix – Marshall Time Modulator (F1)
- George Bohanon – trombone (C3)
- Glenn Ferris – trombone (C3)
- Jim Horn – saxophone (E2)
- Trevor Lawrence – tenor saxophone (A5, B1, D4)
- Steve Madaio – trumpet (A5, B1, C3, D4)
- Raymond Maldonado – trumpet (A5, B1, D4), percussion (B3)
- Hank Redd – alto saxophone (A5, B1, B5, C3, D4), tenor saxophone (C3)
- Dorothy Ashby – harp (D2)
- Bobbi Humphrey – flute (D4)

== Charts ==
=== Weekly charts ===
Chart (1976–77)	Peak position
Australian Kent Music Report	6
Austrian Albums Chart	15
Canadian RPM Albums Chart	1
Dutch Albums Chart	1
Japanese Oricon Albums Chart	40
New Zealand Albums Chart	5
Norwegian VG-lista Albums Chart	6
Swedish Albums Chart	9
UK Albums Chart	2
US Billboard 200	1
West German Media Control Albums Chart	23

Chart (2026)	Peak position
Belgian Albums (Ultratop Flanders)	165

=== Year-end charts ===
Chart (1976)	Position
Australian Albums Chart	49
Canadian Albums Chart	3
Dutch Albums Chart	14
French Albums Chart	11
UK Albums Chart	21

Chart (1977)	Position
Australian Albums Chart	39
Canadian Albums Chart	5
Dutch Albums Chart	7
German Albums Chart	34
UK Albums Chart	18
US Billboard 200	2

== Certifications ==
Region	Certification	Certified units/sales
Australia (ARIA)	Platinum	50,000^{^}
Canada (Music Canada)	2× Platinum	200,000^{^}
Denmark (IFPI Danmark)	Gold	10,000^{‡}
France (SNEP)	Gold	100,000^{*}
Italy (FIMI)	Gold	25,000^{‡}
New Zealand (RMNZ)	Platinum	15,000^{‡}
United Kingdom (BPI)	Platinum	300,000^{^}
United States (RIAA)	Diamond	5,000,000^{^}
^{*} Sales figures based on certification alone.^{^} Shipments figures based on certification alone.^{‡} Sales+streaming figures based on certification alone.

== See also ==
- List of 1970s albums considered the best
- List of Billboard 200 number-one albums of 1976
- List of Billboard 200 number-one albums of 1977
- List of Billboard number-one R&B albums of 1976
- List of Billboard number-one R&B albums of 1977
