= Marcel King =

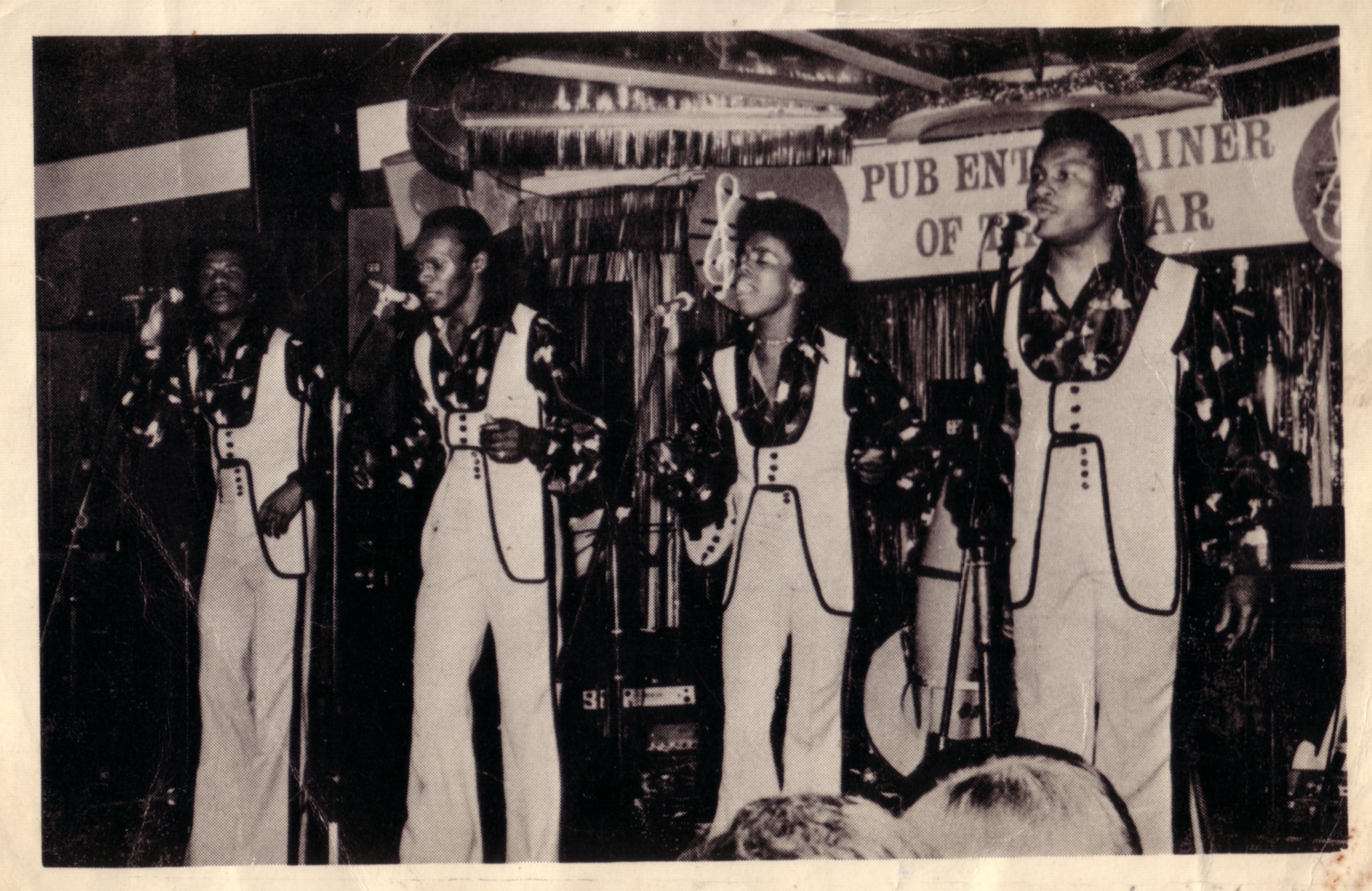
- Sweet Sensation in 1971 (Marcel King second from the right)

Background information
- Born: 4 January 1957; Manchester, England
- Died: 5 October 1995 (aged 38); Manchester, England
- Genres: Soul
- Years active: 1970s-1995
- Formerly of: Sweet Sensation

Marcel Neville King (4 January 1957 - 5 October 1995) was a British tenor singer, who sang lead vocals for Sweet Sensation.

== Career ==
=== Sweet Sensation ===
King joined Sweet Sensation as a teenager, and was the youngest member of the group. He appeared with the group on New Faces. Their second single "Sad Sweet Dreamer", released in 1974, went to number one in the United Kingdom. Marcel, known for his distinctive high tenor voice, was the lead vocalist. In 1975, King left Sweet Sensation, and was replaced by Recardo "Rikki" Patrick. After failing to represent the United Kingdom in A Song for Europe, they were dropped by Pye Records and disbanded with the status of a One-hit wonder group.

=== Solo ===
In 1984, King tried to start a solo career. He recorded a song titled "Reach for Love", that featured Donald Johnson of A Certain Ratio and Bernard Sumner of Joy Division and New Order playing backing instruments on the record. According to New Order manager Rob Gretton, he was a "massive fan of King and thought he was as good of a singer as Michael Jackson". He released four records between March 1984 and March 1985. At the time of his death, King ran a recording studio in Hulme called "The Kitchen".

== Personal life and death ==
King died of a brain haemorrhage in Manchester on 5 October 1995, aged 38.

In 1997, King's son, Zeus, was shot to death in a gang feud in Longsight, Manchester.

== Solo singles ==
- "Reach for Love" / "Keep on Dancin'" (12", Factory FAC-92, March 1984)
- "Reach for Love (New York remix)" / "Reach for Love (dub)" / "Keep on Dancin'" (12", Factory FAC-92-R, February 1985)
- "Reach for Love (New York remix)" / Reach for Love (dub)" (12", Factory Benelux FBN-43, March 1985)
- "Hollywood Nights" (6:02) / "Hollywood Nights (instrumental)" (3:53) (12", Debut 12-DEBT-1, 1985)

== Additional ==
- Marcel King image
