= Sweet Sensation (band) =

British soul group

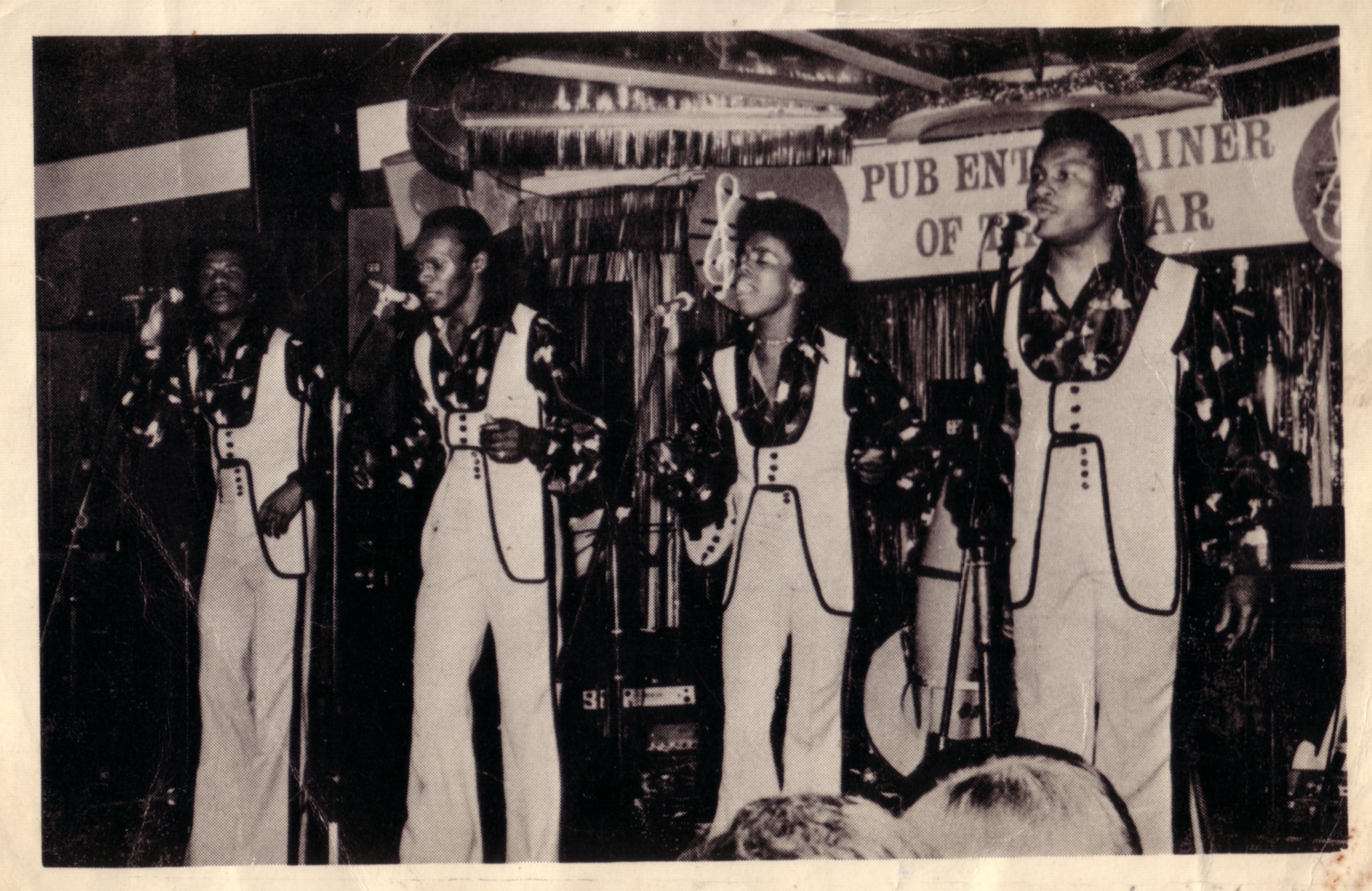
- A promotional image of the group in the Pub Entertainer of the Year competition

Background information
- Origin: Manchester, England
- Genres: Soul
- Years active: 1971–1978
- Label: Pye Records
- Past members: Junior Daye; Roy Flowers; Vincent James; Barry Johnson; Paul Douglas; Marcel King; Rikki Patrick; St. Clair L. Palmer; Gary Shaughnessy; Leroy Smith; Delroy Drummond

Sweet Sensation was an eight-piece British soul group who had some success in the mid-1970s. They are best known for their 1974 No. 1 UK hit, "Sad Sweet Dreamer".

== Career ==
Formed in Manchester in 1971, the band came to prominence after appearing on the ITV talent show New Faces. Under the guidance of panellist Tony Hatch, the band signed to Pye Records. The debut single "Snowfire" failed to reach the charts, but the follow-up "Sad Sweet Dreamer" was a UK number one single in October 1974 that also reached No. 14 on the U.S. Billboard Hot 100 the following spring. The follow-up "Purely by Coincidence" reached No. 11 in the UK in January 1975. Both songs were written by David Parton.

Follow-up singles "Hide Away from the Sun", "Mr Cool", "Sweet Regrets" and "Mail Train" all failed to make the charts over the next couple of years. In 1977, the band participated in A Song for Europe in an attempt to represent the United Kingdom at the Eurovision Song Contest. Their song "You're My Sweet Sensation" ended in eighth place. Subsequently, they were then dropped by Pye and disbanded shortly after. However, they were the forerunners of many similar acts from the Real Thing to Imagination.

The youngest member and lead vocalist, Marcel King, tried to resurrect a solo career in 1985, and with Donald Johnson (A Certain Ratio) and Bernard Sumner (New Order) recorded "Reach for Love" (written by King) for Factory Records without commercial success, followed by "Hollywood Nights" for ZYX. King died of a brain hemorrhage on 5 October 1995 at age 38.

Bass guitarist Barry Johnson later joined Quando Quango and then Aswad.

Founder member Leroy Smith was found dead in his Manchester flat on 15 January 2009. He died from bronchopneumonia at age 56.

== Band members ==
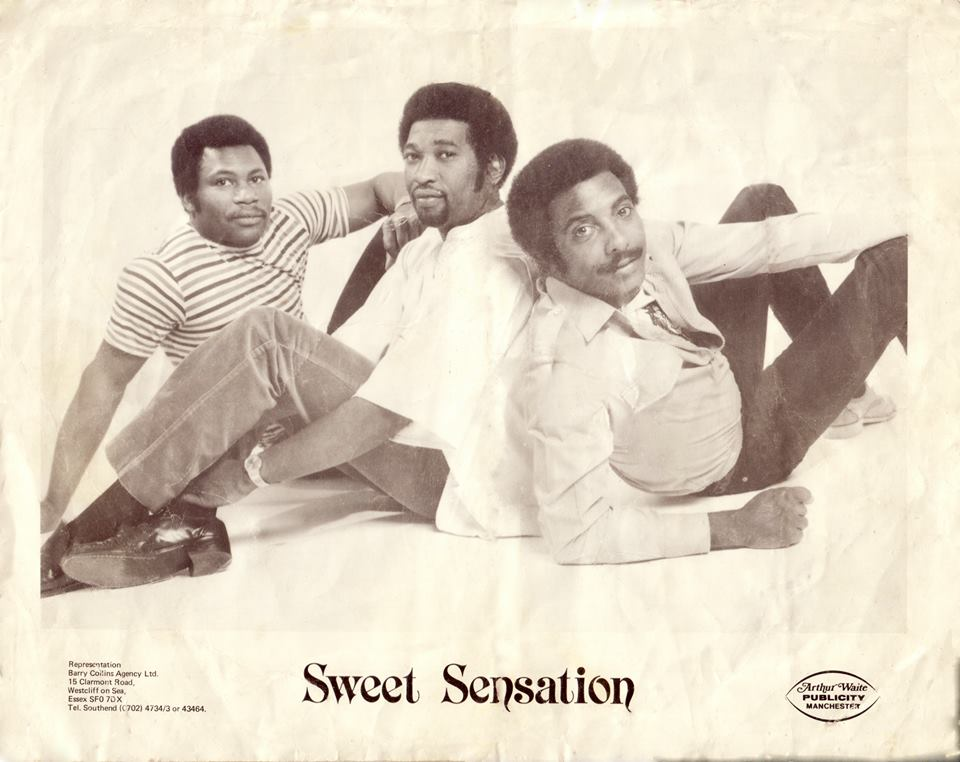
Sweet Sensation publicity photo of original founding members

- Junior Daye (born 26 June 1950, Kingston, Jamaica) – vocalist
- Roy Flowers (born 4 August 1951, Kingston, Jamaica) – drummer
- Vincent James (born 12 February 1951, St. Mary's, Jamaica - died 9 May 2019) – vocalist
- Barry Johnson (born 20 August 1954, Kingston, Jamaica) – bassist
- Marcel King (born Marcel Neville King, 4 January 1957, Manchester – died 5 October 1995) – vocalist
- St. Clair L. Palmer (born 4 March 1954, St. Kitts) – vocalist
- Gary Shaugnessy (born 25 July 1953, Manchester) – guitarist
- Leroy Smith (born 3 September 1952, Kingston, Jamaica – died 15 January 2009) – keyboardist
- Delroy Alexander Drummond (born 26 December 1950, Kingston, Jamaica) – vocalist

Recardo "Rikki" Patrick replaced Marcel King in 1975.

== Discography ==
=== Album ===
- 1975: Sweet Sensation (Pye) (released as "Sad Sweet Dreamer" in North America) (US No. 163)

=== Singles ===
Year	Title	Label	Peak chart positions				Certifications
Year	Title	Label	US Adult	US R&B	US	UK	Certifications
1974	"Snow Fire"	Pye Records	—	—	—	—	
1974	"Sad Sweet Dreamer"	Pye Records	18	63	14	1	BPI: Silver
1975	"Purely by Coincidence"	Pye Records	—	—	—	11	
1975	"Hide Away from the Sun"	Pye Records	—	—	—	—	
1975	"Mr Cool"	Pye Records	—	—	—	—	
1976	"Sweet Regrets"	Pye Records	—	—	—	—	
1976	"Mail Train"	Pye Records	—	—	—	—	
1977	"You're My Sweet Sensation"	Pye Records	—	—	—	—	
1977	"Wake Up and Be Somebody"	Pye Records	—	—	—	—	
"—" denotes releases that did not chart or were not released in that territory.

=== Marcel King solo discography ===
- "Reach for Love" / "Keep on Dancin'" (12", Factory FAC-92, March 1984)
- "Reach for Love (New York remix)" / "Reach for Love (dub)" / "Keep on Dancin'" (12", Factory FAC-92-R, February 1985)
- "Reach for Love (New York remix)" / Reach for Love (dub)" (12", Factory Benelux FBN-43, March 1985)
- "Hollywood Nights" (6:02) / "Hollywood Nights (instrumental)" (3:53) (12", Debut 12-DEBT-1, 1985)
