= Black Man (song) =

Song by Stevie Wonder

from the album Songs in the Key of Life
- Released: 1976
- Genre: Funk rock
- Length: 8:30
- Songwriters: Stevie Wonder; Gary Byrd
- Producer: Stevie Wonder

Licensed audio
- "Black Man" on YouTube

"Black Man" is a track on the 1976 Stevie Wonder album Songs in the Key of Life. The song was written by Wonder and Gary Byrd.

The song was written about Wonder's desire for worldwide interracial harmony, and criticism of racism. The lyrics referred prominently to Crispus Attucks, widely considered the first martyr of the American Revolution. Wonder deliberately chose this theme as the United States Bicentennial was underway at the time of recording.

== Lyrics ==
The opening verses refer to 12 people, with four people per verse each, broken by the chorus and bridge. The song uses color terminology for race.

1. a black man – first man to die for the American flag (Crispus Attucks)
2. the redman – first people on American ground (Native American people)
3. a brown man – guide on the first Columbus trip (Pedro Alonso Niño)
4. the yellow man – laid tracks for railroads (Chinese workers)
5. a black man – first heart surgeon (Dr. Daniel Hale Williams)
6. a redman – helped pilgrims to survive at Plymouth (Squanto)
7. a brown man – leader for farm workers' rights (Cesar Chavez)
8. a white man – inventor of incandescent light bulb (Thomas Edison)
9. a black man – created first clock to be made in America (Benjamin Banneker)
10. a red woman – scout who helped lead Lewis and Clark Expedition (Sacagawea)
11. a yellow man – pioneer of martial arts in America (Bruce Lee)
12. a white man – Emancipation Proclamation (Abraham Lincoln)

The second section is a call-and-response format, calling out 17 people.

1. Matthew Henson – a black man – first man to set foot on the North Pole
2. Squanto – a redman – first American to show the pilgrims at Plymouth the secrets of survival in the New World
3. Sing Kee – a yellow man – soldier of Company G who won high honors for extraordinary heroism in World War I
4. Cesar Chavez – a brown man – leader of United Farm Workers who helped farm workers maintain dignity and respect
5. Dr. Charles Drew – a black man – founder of blood plasma and the director of the Red Cross blood bank
6. Sacagawea – a red woman – great American heroine who aided the Lewis and Clark Expedition
7. Hayakawa – a yellow man – famous educator and semanticist who made outstanding contributions to education in America
8. Garrett Morgan – a black man – invented the world's first stop light and the gas mask
9. Harvey William Cushing – a white man – American surgeon who was one of the founders of neurosurgery
10. Benjamin Banneker – a black man – man who helped design the nation's capitol, made the first clock to give time in America and wrote the first almanac
11. Hiawatha – a red man – legendary hero who helped establish the league of Iroquois
12. Michio Kushi – a yellow man – leader of the first macrobiotic center in America
13. Jean Baptiste – a black man – founder of the city of Chicago in 1772
14. Dennis Banks – a red man – one of the organizers of the American Indian movement
15. Luis de Santángel – a white man – Jewish financier who raised funds to sponsor Christopher Columbus' voyage to America
16. Harriet Tubman – a black woman – woman who led countless slaves to freedom on the Underground Railroad
17. T. J. Marshall – a black man – inventor of the fire extinguisher (barely heard during fadeout)
