= Whitney Houston memorial service =

2012 memorial service of American singer and actress

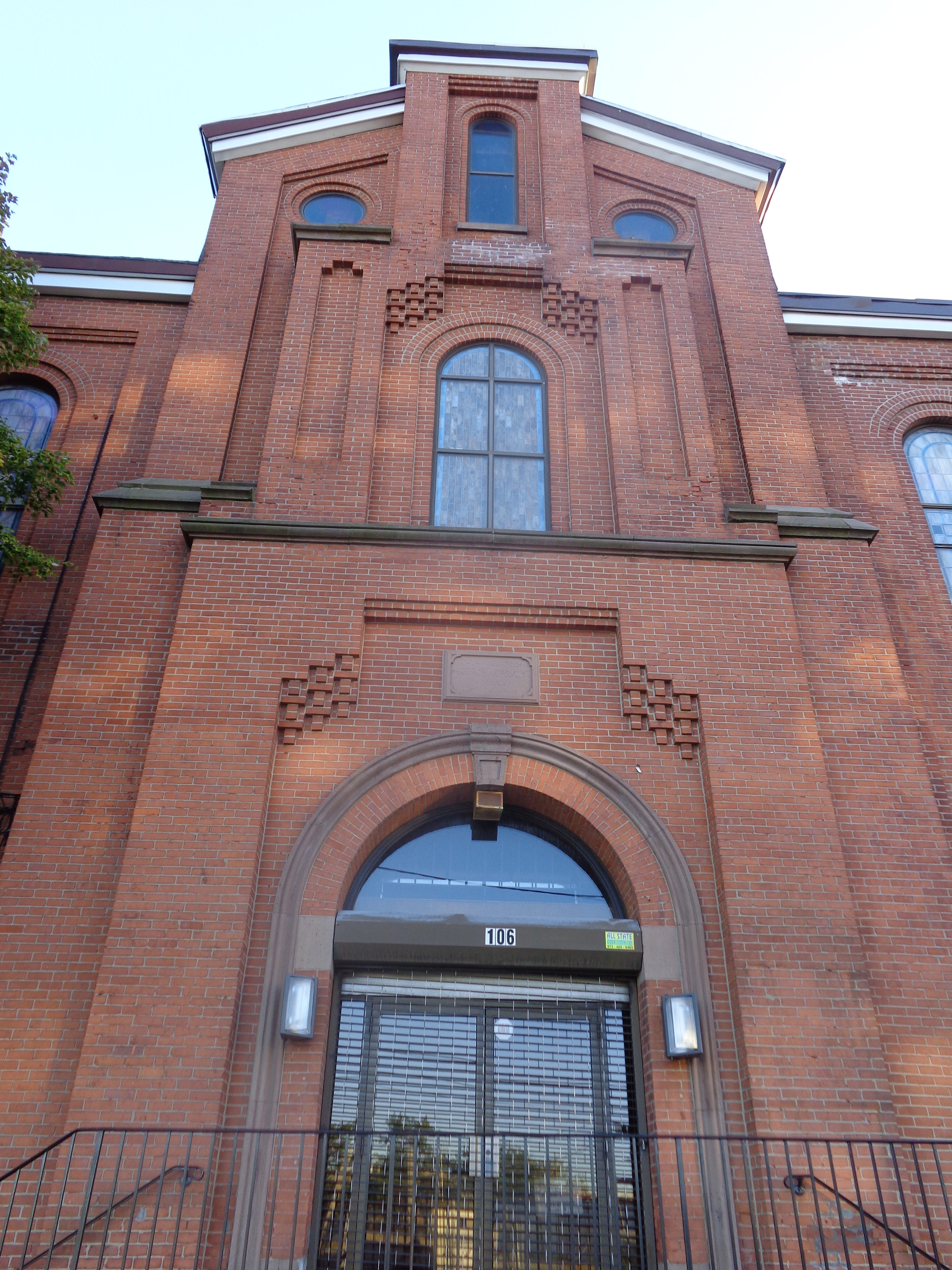
- Held at New Hope Baptist Church, where Houston sang as a child.
- Date: February 18, 2012
- Location: New Hope Baptist Church, Newark, New Jersey, United States

An invitation-only memorial service for American cultural icon Whitney Houston, which was broadcast globally, was held on February 18, 2012, at New Hope Baptist Church in Newark, New Jersey, seven days after her death. The homegoing was preceded by a private wake at the Whigham Funeral Home in Newark. Houston was subsequently buried at Fairview Cemetery in Westfield, New Jersey, next to her father John Houston Jr.

Plans to have a public memorial service at the Prudential Center were thwarted by Houston's mother Cissy Houston. Eventually, the family decided on New Hope due to hopes of wanting a more private and intimate memorial rather than at an arena. Fans who couldn't get in gathered at barricades during the funeral. The memorial began at approximately 12:00 p.m. local time and was to end at around 2:00 p.m. but extended to nearly 4:00 p.m. On the day of the service, all New Jersey flags flew at half-staff in honor of Houston.

Stevie Wonder, Alicia Keys, Kim Burrell, BeBe Winans, CeCe Winans, Donnie McClurkin and R. Kelly either sang Houston's songs or reinterpreted other songs in honor of the singer while Bishop TD Jakes gave a sermon. Aretha Franklin, who was supposed to perform at the funeral, pulled out for health reasons, while Bobby Brown attended the funeral but left early after arguments over his and his family's seating in the church.

Others such as Tyler Perry, BeBe Winans, Dionne Warwick, Rickey Minor, Houston's sister-in-law and manager Pat and security guard Ray Watson spoke of their memories of Houston while Clive Davis, Kevin Costner, her co-star in The Bodyguard and Marvin Winans gave eulogies. Toward the end of the funeral, Houston's casket was lifted and carried off by pallbearers as Houston's iconic rendition of "I Will Always Love You" played on the speakers.

== Background ==
=== Initial plans ===
Houston died on February 11, 2012 in Beverly Hills, California at the Beverly Hilton hotel, the same night she was to attend Clive Davis's pre-Grammy party, which was subsequently turned into a tribute to the late artist.

Following her autopsy, Houston's body was flown back from California to her home state of New Jersey by Tyler Perry's private jet on February 13.

There were rumors spreading that a public memorial service, similar to Houston's contemporary, singer Michael Jackson's, would be held at the 18,000-seated Prudential Center. However, Houston's mother Cissy Houston turned down that plan, telling people that she "shared Whitney with the public long enough".

Instead, the family agreed to have a more private, invitation-only funeral at Houston's childhood church, New Hope Baptist Church, which seated more than 1,500 and was where Houston first sang solos as a preteen.

The decision to do so was to have a more private and intimate memorial to remember her “rather than at a large event or an arena.”

Said Carolyn Whigham of Whigham Funeral Home at the time, “They have shared her for 30-some years with the city, with the state, with the world. This is their time now for their farewell.”

=== Private wake ===
On February 17, a private wake was held at the Whigham Funeral Home in Newark, attended by most of Houston's family, including her daughter Bobbi Kristina Brown and Houston's elder brother Michael.

The wake generated controversy after a picture of Houston in her open casket was sent to the National Enquirer, who posted the photo in the cover of their February 22 issue, with the title "Whitney: The Last Photo! Inside Her Private Viewing".

The singer was laid in a golden casket with cream-colored lining accentuated with her childhood nickname, "Nippy," and music symbols. Houston was wearing a purple dress, a diamond brooch, earrings and gold slippers. The Enquirer never revealed who sent the photo. The funeral home denied leaking the photo. Houston's family spoke out against the photo leak.

== Service ==
Hours before the service began on February 18, mourners fell quiet as Houston's gold casket — draped in white roses and purple lilies — entered the church, lifted by three police officers, followed by Houston's mother, who was carried side by side by family members as the choir, dressed in white and gold robes, sang in hushed tones, "Whitney, Whitney, Whitney". According to reports, Cissy and Houston's daughter Bobbi Kristina were seen holding each other throughout the funeral.

The service reportedly began at around 12:18 p.m., eighteen minutes after it was supposed to began, starting with the choir singing "The Lord Is My Shepherd" before remarks were read by New Hope minister Rev. Joe A. Carter, who started the service by saying "We're here today with hearts broken, but with God's strength we celebrate the life of Whitney Houston." Carter was then followed by Cory Booker, then the mayor of Newark, took to the pulpit and stated, "May we understand that while we weep now, weeping may endure through the night, but joy—joy cometh in the morning."

This was then followed by gospel singer Donnie McClurkin, singing his song "Stand", which Houston's family had requested he sang.

After an introduction by Dionne Warwick, Tyler Perry spoke at the podium, stating, "There are two constants that I know about Whitney Houston: there was a grace that carried her from heaven down through Miss Cissy Houston, a grace that brought her up through singing. The other thing I know for sure: Whitney Houston loved the Lord."

Perry also mentioned his "candid" conversations with Houston, recalling the singer telling him that she "wasn't even supposed to be able to speak, let alone sing, because of an incident that happened to her as a child," stating that Houston held on to her faith, adding "Before I could get words out to encourage her, she would say, 'But the Lord'" and that "nothing was able to separate her from her love of God."

Singer BeBe Winans, teary-eyed, told the congregation about their friendship, which started in the mid-1980s telling them "We spent a lot of time together and we talk about her voice and we talk about her talent, which was a beautiful thing, but what I’m going to miss is crazy Whitney".

Illuminating this point, Winans recalled Houston buying him and sister CeCe outfits for a debut headlining tour the sibling duo were planning. Houston mentioned buying suits for the duo and the entire band and buying her a dress because, Winans added, "she decided at the height of her career she was going to come sing background with BeBe and CeCe", despite the fact that it "made Clive mad." When Winans told her that it wasn't necessary and that it "wasn't a material relationship", Houston asked them, "you my brother and sister, right?" to which Winans said "yes". Houston then asked "and I'm your sister, right? And we love each other, right?" to which Winans again said "yes" to both questions.

The congregation erupted in laughter when Winans mentioned Houston asking them, "and y'all broke, right? And I'm rich, right? And I can buy what I want to for y’all, right?" to which Winans added, "And that is the Whitney. That is the Whitney," then adding that that was the Houston he would miss the most before launching into his song, "I Really Miss You", which Winans had originally written for his late elder brother Ron, but re-dedicated to Houston.

Winans was then followed by Bishop TD Jakes, who delivered a rousing sermon about the "promise of tomorrow", telling the congregation, "Death has not won. Your tears may flow. The flowers might wither. You will find people you love may leave you outwardly, but (they) will not leave you inwardly."

Kim Burrell, one of Houston's friends, came after him to sing her rendition of Sam Cooke's "A Change Is Gonna Come", in which was rewritten in honor of Houston, starting with the words "she was born in Newark". After ending the song, Burrell went down to the audience where Houston's mother sat in the front and the two embraced each other.

Kevin Costner delivered an emotional eulogy to Houston recalling their shared religious Baptist faith and the singer and actress's nervousness in accepting and participating in The Bodyguard as well as the obstacles she had to overcome to receive the role including her race and the fact that it was her first film as well as her own concerns about being "good enough" for the role, praising her talent, stating, "Whitney, if you could hear me now, I would tell you, you weren't just good enough, you were great. You made The Bodyguard the picture that it was. A lot of leading men could have filled my part. But Whitney, you're the only one who I believed could have played [the character of] Rachel Marron at that time. I was your pretend-bodyguard once long ago, and now you're gone too soon."

Costner ended his eulogy with the words, "So off you go, Whitney, off you go. Escorted by an army of angels to your heavenly Father, and when you sing before Him, don’t you worry. You’ll be good enough." Costner was received with a standing ovation following his eulogy.

After tearfully remembering Houston as a mentor to young female artists including her, singer and pianist Alicia Keys, who co-penned Houston's final hit, "Million Dollar Bill", sang "Send Me an Angel" while playing piano.

Clive Davis, her longtime boss and mentor, took to the podium to talk about their 30-year professional and personal relationship, saying, "I loved her very much. Whitney was purely and simply one of a kind. Yes, she admitted to crises in her life. Yes, she confessed to Oprah about her searing battles. But when I needed her, she was there for me. An eternally loyal friend."

Stevie Wonder recalled "this is an emotional moment for me" and then joked, "In my little fantasy world, I had a little crush on Whitney", adding, "I just had so much respect for her love of music", before singing his songs, "Ribbon in the Sky", which he rewrote for Houston, and "Love's in Need of Love Today", on the piano.

Her sister-in-law and former manager Pat Houston said of Houston, "Even when she was tired and a bit lost, she gave and gave, and then gave some more. When she didn't want to do things, she did it anyway, and we are so much better because of it."

Pat was then followed by her brother and Houston's longtime security guard of 11 years, Ray Watson, who spoke of memories being with Houston, including her last days in which he recalled the singer talking "biblically", adding "She laid her head on my shoulder and said, 'We are gonna be all right.'"

R. Kelly gave a rendition of Houston's hit, "I Look to You", which he'd written for her, while fighting back tears before finally completing the song. Warwick returned to the pulpit to read the poem written for the occasion, "Don't Grieve for Me, Now I'm Free".

CeCe Winans then took to the pulpit to belt the song "Don't Cry for Me", which she had originally recorded in 1988 and which Houston herself covered live during an AIDS benefit concert in 1994, and "Jesus Loves Me", a song Houston recorded for the soundtrack to The Bodyguard.

Houston's former musical director and longtime friend of over 30 years, Rickey Minor, took to the podium recalling his friendship with Houston, which started when the singer was 18, adding "It didn't take me long to realize that I love Whitney Houston. … What a voice. Not a voice. The voice."

Marvin Winans, who had presided over the wedding of Houston's marriage to Bobby Brown, delivered the final eulogy, which lasted over 30 minutes and included his siblings BeBe, CeCe, Michael, Carvin and Angie & Debbie ending at around 3:34 p.m. Winans told the Detroit Free Press that he felt like he had lost a sibling upon learning of Houston's death.

During his eulogy, Winans recalled he and brother Carvin had attended one of Houston's concerts in 1985 during the time they were in the sibling group the Winans after being told Houston had covered the group's 1984 hit "Tomorrow" in her performances and subsequently the entire Winans family launched into an impromptu version of the song to pay tribute to Houston.

Following the end of Winans's eulogy, Houston's casket was lifted off by pallbearers as the sound of Houston's "I Will Always Love You" played on the speakers; as the casket was lifted up, Cissy Houston could be heard wailing loudly, "my baby, my baby!" She was then carried off tearfully by family members as Houston's casket left the church. Houston was buried on February 19, 2012, in Fairview Cemetery, in Westfield, New Jersey, next to her father, John Russell Houston Jr., who had died in February 2003.

=== Guest list ===
The participants were Rev. Joe A. Carter (New Hope minister), Cory Booker, gospel singers Donnie McClurkin, Kim Burrell, BeBe Winans and CeCe Winans, TD Jakes, Kevin Costner, Alicia Keys, Clive Davis, Stevie Wonder, Pat Garland-Houston, Ray Watson, R. Kelly, Dionne Warwick, Rickey Minor and Marvin Winans.

In addition to the above people, other celebrities who attended the funeral included Mariah Carey, who duetted with Houston on their 1998 hit, "When You Believe" from The Prince of Egypt along with her then-husband Nick Cannon, Oprah Winfrey, Brandy, Brandy's brother Ray J (who was seen crying during the service and had to be consoled by Brandy), Monica, Swizz Beatz, Mary J. Blige, Chaka Khan, Queen Latifah, songwriter Diane Warren, civil rights activists and ministers Jesse Jackson and Al Sharpton, Elton John, New Jersey governor Chris Christie, Spike Lee, Bill Cosby, Denzel Washington, Houston's co-star in The Preacher's Wife, her Waiting to Exhale co-stars Angela Bassett, Loretta Devine and Lela Rochon, Jennifer Hudson, Roberta Flack, Jay-Z, Beyoncé and Jordin Sparks, her co-star in her final film, Sparkle.

Singer Jermaine Jackson, with whom worked with Houston on her acclaimed debut album and allegedly engaged in a clandestine affair that later influenced the recording and music video of her first number one hit, "Saving All My Love for You", was reportedly so distraught over Houston's death that he decided to skip the funeral.

Houston's lifelong friend and former personal assistant Robyn Crawford attended the funeral, sitting in the seventh row of seats.

=== Chris Christie half-staff flag order ===
Four days before the service on February 14, New Jersey governor Chris Christie announced in a press conference that all state and government flags in the state of New Jersey would be flown at half-staff in honor of Houston on the day of her funeral. Christie stated during the press conference: "Obviously, Whitney Houston was an important part of the fabric, the cultural fabric of this state," adding that Houston was part of the same "pantheon of great New Jersey musical talents" as [fellow Jersey musicians] Bruce Springsteen and Frank Sinatra." Christie further added, "She was a cultural icon in this state and her accomplishments in her life were a source of great pride for many people in this state and for this state as a whole. On that basis, I think she's entitled to have that recognition made for her." The order followed a similar one for late E Street Band member Clarence Clemons following his death in June 2011.

The announcement, however, wasn't without controversy as some critics, including military families and citizens feeling that the half-staff honor should only go to elected officials, first responders, and military service members who have died in the line of duty, while others brought up the singer's personal issues. Others, however, defended the decision with some stating it "wouldn't be a discussion if the person being honored was New Jersey's Jon Bon Jovi or Bruce Springsteen" with Teresa Masterson reporting that flags in New Jersey flew at half-staff following Sinatra's own death in 1998.

The Wednesday before the funeral, Christie defended his decision, rejecting complaints that Houston "forfeited the good things that she did" because of her struggles with substance abuse, adding "what I would say to everybody is there but for the grace of God go I." Christie claimed the honor to Houston was due to her being a "cultural icon" and a "daughter of New Jersey".

=== Aretha Franklin's absence ===
One of the guests who wasn't able to make it to the funeral was Aretha Franklin, who was scheduled to sing Houston's hit "Greatest Love of All" at the event but health problems, such as leg spasms and locked leg muscles, kept her from coming that morning.

However, Franklin would generate controversy when she performed later that night at Radio City Music Hall, leading to some rumors she was disinvited to the funeral by the Houston family, which Franklin denied.

Franklin reportedly said in a statement on February 23, "Extra TV, the New York Post and Newsday (New York) should stop the BS," noting her 50-year friendship with Houston's mother Cissy, adding "I have four invitations and parking passes that were sent to me for the funeral. Extra TV, the New York Post and Newsday (New York) are more interested in sensationalism and negative speculations than the truth." She added: "Cissy does not need ridiculous speculation and neither do I – particularly at this time … Knowing Cissy as well as I do, I know Whitney left home right and properly."

Franklin did pay tribute to Houston the night of her Radio City performance, giving a gospel-inflected rendition of "I Will Always Love You" and calling Houston "one of the greatest singers to ever touch a microphone".

=== Bobby Brown controversy ===
Houston's ex-husband, singer Bobby Brown, attended the funeral but left early before the service began.

Prior to the start of the funeral, news media caught a visibly upset Brown being consoled by people before leaving the premises. It was later learned Brown had arrived with an entourage of nine, including his then-girlfriend Alicia Etheridge, three of his children Landon, LaPrincia and Bobby Jr., and several siblings and that after an altercation with security, decided to leave. In a statement, Brown said: "My children and I were invited to the funeral of my ex-wife Whitney Houston. We were seated by security and then subsequently asked to move on three separate occasions."

He added, "I fail to understand why security treated my family this way and continue to ask us and no one else to move. Security then prevented me from attempting to see my daughter Bobbi-Kristina. In light of the events, I gave a kiss to the casket of my ex-wife and departed as I refused to create a scene." Adding that his children were "distraught" over the treatment, Brown said, "This was a day to honor Whitney. I doubt Whitney would have wanted this to occur. I will continue to pay my respects to my ex-wife the best way I know how."

=== Kevin Costner's decision ===
According to Kevin Costner, he initially was just going to attend the funeral and grieve in private but his decision to speak was influenced by Dionne Warwick, who called him and convinced him to speak at the funeral.

Costner stated, "I got a call from Dionne Warwick and I could tell in her voice she was broken. I said yes to her when I had been saying no all week."

While preparing to step to the podium, Costner was told that CNN was broadcasting the service and asked him if he could shorten what turned out to be a "17-minute eulogy" so they could cut to commercials to which the actor flatly refused, telling them "they can play the commercial while I'm talking, I don't care." CNN allowed the eulogy to air.

=== Cissy Houston's letter to Whitney ===
During funeral proceedings, attendants received the funeral program in which contained a letter written by Houston's mother Cissy.

The letter was later reported by Vibe magazine, which stated in the letter that Houston "always gave without expecting anything in return." The letter also revealed that she never told [Houston] that when she was born she was told that the singer would not be with her long."

The letter read:

"Dearest Whitney:

The presence of God blessed our home with life, love, joy and peace. You and your brothers were the center of divine love attracting God's richest blessings. You were a child of God. We had so much love in our home that was truly from on high.

You always gave without expecting anything in return and our love was the force that multiplied these blessings higher and higher. I never told you that when you were born the Holy Spirit told me that you would not be with me long and I thank God for the beautiful flower he allowed me to raise and cherish for 48 years.

God said it's time Nippy; your work is done. The other day on February 11th He came for you. But not without warning. For two months now I have been depressed, crying, lonesome and sad not knowing why.

On Saturday, before I found out about your transition, my doorbell rang. I went to answer it but there was no one there. It rang again and again, no one was there so I called the concierge to tell him someone was ringing my doorbell. He checked the cameras and told me that no one was there. You promised me you were coming to spend time with me after the Grammys. I believe the spirits allowed you to come after all.

How I love you Nippy and how I miss you, your beautiful smile, your special little things you used to say to me and sometimes you'd call just to say hi Mommie, I love you so much, I loved you so much more.

I love you, I'll miss you,

Thank you for being such a wonderful daughter.

Rest my baby girl in Peace, you're now in the arms of Jesus."

=== Live broadcast and media coverage ===
Houston's funeral was televised and reportedly drew millions. It was reported by Adweek that Houston's funeral was viewed by over nine million viewers across all cable news networks in the US alone. Because Saturday viewerships are "usually slow", Houston's funeral set records for Saturday cable TV viewership.

According to CNN stats, the funeral was watched by over 5.4 million viewers on the channel. 1.42 and 1.38 million viewers respectively watched the proceedings on HLN and Fox News, while over 709,000 viewers watched on MSNBC.

The funeral was also streamed on the Associated Press, which reported that the live stream accumulated 7.3 million streams and had two million unique visitors during the funeral, surpassing the all-time AP Live streams from the British royal wedding of Prince William and Kate Middleton.

== Bibliography ==
- Houston, Cissy (2013). Remembering Whitney: My Story of Love, Loss, and the Night the Music Stopped. HarperCollins. ISBN 978-0-06-223839-9.
