= Salomé de Bahia =

Brazilian singer

Salomé de Bahia (born 23 June 1945) is a Brazilian vocalist.

== Biography ==
Salomé de Bahia was born on 23 June 1945 in Salvador. She lives in Paris. De Bahia's musical career started in 1958. She met Parisian DJ and producer Bob Sinclar in 1997 in jazz cafe Chez Felix in Paris. De Bahia gained wider popularity in 1998 when she started to cooperate with Sinclar and they released the compilation Sun Sun on Sony records. She also adopted songs such as Stevie Wonder's "Another Star", listed as "Outro Lugar", as well as Barry Manilow's "Copacabana". She is a versatile singer and sings in various musical genres like bossa nova, salsa, jazz and electronic music.

== Discography ==
=== Albums ===
- (2002) Cabaret - EastWest Records
- (2005) Brasil - Tommy Boy Entertainment

=== Singles & EPs ===
- (1979) Jack, Jack, Jack/Red Balloon - Jupiter Records
- (1997) Bob Sinclar Feat. Salomé De Bahia - Eu So Quero Um Xodo (12", Ltd) - Columbia Records
- (1999) Outro Lugar - Yellow Productions
- (2001) Tormento de Amor - Yellow Productions
- (2002) Theme of Rio - Yellow Productions
- (2004) Taj Mahal - Yellow Productions
- (2005) Copacabana - Yellow Productions
- (2008) Prok & Fitch Present Salome de Bahia - Outro Lugar - Stealth records
- (2008) DJ Wady & Patrick M / Prok & Fitch Present Salomé De Bahia - Pacha Ibiza 2008/2 - Vendetta records
