= Love's in Need of Love Today =

1976 song by Stevie Wonder

Song by Stevie Wonder

from the album Songs in the Key of Life
- Released: September 28, 1976
- Genre: Soul; R&B
- Length: 7:05
- Label: Tamla
- Songwriter: Stevie Wonder
- Producer: Stevie Wonder

Licensed audio
- "Love's in Need of Love Today" on YouTube

"Love's in Need of Love Today" is a song written by American singer, songwriter and musician Stevie Wonder. A soulful R&B ballad, it is the opening track from his 1976 album, Songs in the Key of Life.

== Composition ==
Wonder conceived the title phrase of "Love's in Need of Love Today" before the rest of the lyrics. In 2015, he said the following of the song's meaning and its personal significance to him:

The concept I had in mind was that for love to be effective, it has to be fed. Love by itself is hollow. [...] When I was finished [recording the song], I listened to the playback and realized the song was perfect to open the album [Songs in the Key of Life], to set the entire tone. [...] It's still emotional for me. When I performed it in New York recently, I broke down. I've seen people come and go, and live and die, cry and laugh. It all came rushing back.

Wonder began writing "Love's in Need of Love Today" in late 1974, while at a hotel in New York, when his then-partner Yolanda Simmons was pregnant with their daughter Aisha. He recorded a demo of the song in the key of D in his hotel room on a Fender Rhodes piano, using a portable Nakamichi cassette recorder.

The first lines of the song ("Good morn' or evening friends / Here's your friendly announcer / I have serious news to pass on to everybody") were influenced by church radio programs, 1950s gospel quartets, and singer-songwriter Sam Cooke. Author Zeth Lundy described the song's lyrics as being "from the perspective of a DJ or preacher or barker or simply God-possessed vessel—[they are the album's] rallying cry, quieting the crowd and disseminating information. It's a self-conscious 'announcement' track in the vein of Sgt. Pepper's Lonely Hearts Club Band or The Village Green Preservation Society's title track; the narrator directly addresses the listener and details his concerns about the ongoing battle between love and hate, a topic the album goes on to tote throughout its 105 minutes."

== Recording ==
In 1975, Wonder brought the demo recording of the song to Crystal Sound studio in Hollywood, California, where he further developed its lyrics and chords. Unlike the demo recording, Wonder decided to play the song in the key of E-flat, which he felt better suited his voice and overall "felt better, spiritually". He also developed the song's choral introduction, which is performed by Wonder using overdubbing.

Wonder provided the song's vocals and played most of the instruments present on the recording: the Clavinet, bass synthesizer, and drums. He also added elements of strings using a Yamaha GX-1, drawing inspiration from the string sounds found in the music of Al Green. Musician Eddie "Bongo" Brown contributed congas to the track.

== Live performances ==
In 1985, Wonder performed "Love's in Need of Love Today" as a duet with English singer-songwriter George Michael at the Apollo Theater for the television special Motown Returns to the Apollo.

In 2001, Wonder performed the song with the a cappella group Take 6 during America: A Tribute to Heroes, a benefit concert held in the aftermath of the September 11 attacks. The performance won a Grammy Award for Best R&B Performance by a Duo or Group with Vocals at the 45th Annual Grammy Awards.

Wonder performed the song at Whitney Houston's memorial service in February 2012.

Wonder performed the "Love's in Need of Love Today" on January 30, 2025 at Intuit Dome in Inglewood, California for FireAid to help with relief efforts for the January 2025 Southern California wildfires.

== Cover versions ==
In 1987, George Michael released a live cover performance of "Love's in Need of Love Today", recorded at Wembley Arena, as the B-side of his single "Father Figure". Michael went on to perform the song live during his 1988–1989 world concert tour the Faith Tour. In 1993, Michael performed the song at the Concert of Hope, held on World AIDS Day at Wembley Arena, dedicating the song to those in the audience who had lost someone to HIV/AIDS.

Whitney Houston opened her South Africa concerts with the song in 1994, which aired on HBO live November 12. The opening concert was eventually released for its 30th anniversary in theaters and on CD/vinyl.

In 2020, during the NBA All-Star weekend, American rapper and singer Queen Latifah performed a cover of the song at the United Center in Chicago on the night before the 2020 NBA All-Star Game.

== Personnel ==
- Stevie Wonder – lead and backing vocals, clavinet, Fender Rhodes piano, Yamaha GX-1 synth, synth bass, drums
- Eddie "Bongo" Brown – congas
