= Lau Sing Kee =

American soldier and businessman (1896–1967)

Lau Sing Kee (January 25, 1896 - June 3, 1967) was a World War I recipient of the United States Army's Distinguished Service Cross and France's Croix de Guerre for extraordinary heroism in combat, the first Chinese American to receive these honors. Later, he was a businessman and civic leader in New York City's Chinese community. In 1957 he was convicted and sentenced to two and a half years in prison for selling false documents to aid in the evasion of the then discriminatory restrictions on Chinese immigration to the United States.

== Early life ==
Lau Sing Kee was born into an immigrant family at a time when the Chinese Exclusion Act (1882) and subsequent federal laws severely restricted not only Chinese immigration to the United States but also the rights of Chinese already living in the U.S. His family resided in Saratoga, California, then moved to nearby San Jose. His father made a living as a store owner and labor contractor. He attended local schools. His Chinese surname was Lau, but when it was mistakenly listed as Kee he accepted the change. Becoming known as Sing Kee, he would pass down Kee as the family name to his progeny.

== World War I heroism ==
Sing Kee moved from California to Manhattan's Chinatown in 1917, the year that the United States entered World War I. He soon enlisted in the Army, serving in the 77th Infantry Division, which was originally recruited from New York City and the vicinity; its members were nicknamed the “Cosmopolitans” because of their wide variety of ethnic backgrounds. The division arrived in France in April 1918 and in July first engaged in combat at the Battle of Chateau-Thierry. In mid August, Private Kee's 306th Infantry Regiment held a position at the village of Mont-Notre-Dame in northern France during a German offensive. Kee was one of twenty runners taking messages between the command post and front line units, encountering machine gun fire, bombs, and poison gas. As the rest of the messengers were either killed or incapacitated during the two day battle, Kee carried on alone, maintaining communications despite shrapnel wounds and the effects of gassings, refusing to be evacuated. The Allied Line at Mont-Notre-Dame held and soon was part of a successful counter-attack.

== Accolades ==
In November, the month of the Armistice, Kee was promoted to color sergeant, skipping several grades of rank. He was awarded a Wound Chevron (a forerunner of the Purple Heart) and the Distinguished Service Cross, the U.S. military's second highest award for heroism, as well as France's Croix de Guerre with silver gilt star. A fellow soldier described him as "the best American in the regiment". The press coverage of Kee's bravery at times reflected the irony of a man from an officially deprecated ethnic group in America, the Chinese, becoming a bona fide American war hero. The Los Angeles Evening Herald reminded its readers that here, a person such as Sing Kee was routinely called a "little chink". Upon his return from Europe in the spring of 1919, Kee participated in parades in New York City (where the New York Times described him as the event's "star exotic") and in San Jose, California where he was joined by his parents.

== Post war pursuits ==
After the war Kee resumed his residence in New York's Chinatown and in 1924 he found work as a translator for the Bureau of Immigration on Ellis Island. In the same year he married Ina Chan of Guangdong province in China. It was an arranged marriage with the bride arriving in the United States only weeks before the Immigration Act of 1924 went into effect, restricting Chinese immigration even further by prohibiting Asian American citizens from bringing intended spouses from Asia to the U.S. The couple would have five children.

In the 1930s Kee left the Immigration Bureau to become a restaurant manager and later an owner. He joined the On Leong Tong (Chinese Merchants Association) which had close ties to Tammany Hall, the city's famed Democratic party machine. He was active in veterans groups. In the late 30s and early 40s the Sino-Japanese War and the Chinese Civil War caused the numbers seeking refuge from East Asia to increase. Sing Kee went into business as a travel agent and immigration broker.

== Violation of immigration laws ==
With each nation battling Japan, the United States and China became allies in World War II and in 1943 the Chinese Exclusion Act was repealed. The overseas spouses and children of Chinese-American citizens could now legally come to the United States. Beyond that, however, legal immigration remained extremely limited with a fixed quota of 105 visas annually for Chinese ethnics. In this context, combined with the prospect and then the reality of a Communist victory in the Chinese Civil War, the practice of creating paper sons thrived. Fraudulent documents were created and sold purporting to show that American citizens had children or spouses overseas and thus eligible to migrate to the United States. Booklets called halgoons were sent to overseas "sons" and sometimes to stateside "parents" with family facts needed to pass routine interrogations. In 1956 Sing Kee was arrested in connection to these activities, and in 1957 he was convicted of violating U.S. immigration laws. He was fined and sentenced to two and a half years in prison. An appeal to a Federal Circuit Court failed and the U.S. Supreme Court declined to hear the case.

== Last years ==
Following his time served at the Danbury Federal Correctional Institution, Kee lived on Staten Island. There he maintained his interest in veterans' affairs, but, plagued by diabetes, his health deteriorated. Lau Sing Kee died on June 3, 1967, two years after the Immigration and Nationality Act of 1965 abolished restrictive ethnic quotas. In 1997 his body was interred in Arlington National Cemetery. In 2011 the U.S. Senate formally apologized for the many decades of laws and policies in America that discriminated against the Chinese.

== Family legacy ==
Two of Lau Sing Kee's children, attorney Norman Lau Kee and medical doctor Herbert Lau Kee, became civic leaders in New York's Chinese-American community. A grandson, Glenn Lau Kee, became the New York State Bar Association's first Asian-American president (2014-2015).

== Stevie Wonder tribute ==
The 1976 Stevie Wonder song Black Man contains the following lyric:

Who was the soldier of Company G who won
high honors for courage and heroism in World War I?
Sing Kee - a yellow man.
