= Stephen St. Croix =

Stephen St. Croix (born Steven Curtis Marshall) (1948–2006) was a multifaceted American artist, audio engineer, producer, equipment designer and inventor.

== Personal life ==
St. Croix was born in Baltimore, Maryland spent his childhood partly in Scottsdale, Arizona. He loved the Caribbean islands, hence the name "St. Croix" which refers to Saint Croix, U.S. Virgin Islands. He first became interested in music and audio electronics while sweeping floors in an alcohol-free nightclub in Phoenix. He was an avid motorcyclist and was interested in improving turbo boost on engines.

He died May 6, 2006, in Woodbine, Maryland, of skin cancer at the age of 58.

== Professional career ==
St. Croix was a columnist for Mix Magazine with which he collaborated for 18 years, authoring the popular "Fast Lane" column until right up to his death. Prior to that, he was a technical editor and consultant to R-E/P magazine and created the "Living with Technology" column. He founded Marshall Electronic (not to be confused with Marshall Amplification or video company Marshall Electronics of Torrance, California) and was one of the first digital mastering engineers to use the first true stereo real-time analyzer (RTA), which he designed himself (Intelligent Devices AD-1 Pro Audio Analyzer). St. Croix also designed and built the Marshall Time Modulator. He redesigned the interface for the Quantec Room Simulator, and also held a patent for guitar synthesizer technology.

In 1995, St. Croix was the main contributor to the design and development of the PARIS digital audio workstation in conjunction with EMU-Ensoniq. He even helped on the marketing of these products. He was passionate about music and taught Audio mastering to a select few. His mastering theories, based on the interpretation of his RTA technologies, have been extended by others but the same principles of frequency alignment still remain.

Other companies St. Croix did design and marketing consultation for were Hybrid Arts, Wadia and Symetrix.

== Music ==
St. Croix played drums (self-taught), electric guitars and keyboards. St. Croix also reconstructed and restored the soundtracks from the films "Wizard of Oz", "Easter Parade", "Yankee Doodle Dandy" and "Gone with The Wind".

Stevie Wonder used the Marshall Time Modulator on "Songs in the Key of Life" and Journey through the Secret Life of Plants.
