= Sir Duke =

1977 single by Stevie Wonder

Single by Stevie Wonder

from the album Songs in the Key of Life
- B-side: "He's Misstra Know-It-All"
- Released: March 22, 1977
- Genre: Pop; R&B; jazz; soul
- Length: 3:52
- Label: Tamla
- Songwriter: Stevie Wonder
- Producer: Stevie Wonder

Stevie Wonder singles chronology
"I Wish" (1976)	"Sir Duke" (1977)	"Another Star" (1977)

"Sir Duke" is a song composed and performed by Stevie Wonder from his 1976 album Songs in the Key of Life. Released as a single in 1977, the track topped the U.S. Billboard Hot 100 and Black Singles charts, and reached number two in the UK Singles Chart, his joint biggest hit there at the time. Billboard ranked it as the No. 18 song of 1977.

The song was written in tribute to Duke Ellington (hence the name Sir Duke), the influential jazz musician who had died in 1974. The lyrics also refer to Count Basie, Glenn Miller, Louis Armstrong, and Ella Fitzgerald. Wonder re-recorded the song for the 1995 live album Natural Wonder.

== Background ==
Wonder wrote the song as a tribute to Duke Ellington, the jazz composer, bandleader, and pianist who had influenced him as a musician. Wonder had already experienced the death of two of his idols (Dinah Washington and Wes Montgomery) after attempting to collaborate with them.

After Ellington died in 1974, Wonder wanted to write a song acknowledging musicians he felt were important. He later said, "I knew the title from the beginning but wanted it to be about the musicians who did something for me. So soon they are forgotten. I wanted to show my appreciation."

Wonder pays tribute to "some of music's pioneers" in the song: "There's Basie, Miller, Satchmo, and the king of all, Sir Duke / And with a voice like Ella's ringing out / There's no way the band can lose".

Wonder recorded other tributes to people he admired, including the 1980 songs "Master Blaster", dedicated to Bob Marley, and "Happy Birthday", which pleaded for what would eventually become the Martin Luther King Jr. Day holiday in the United States.

== Reception ==
Cash Box said that "it's a tribute to jazz and roots, with a beat that lies somewhere between jazz and funk, and a horn section that dances on winged feet." Record World said upon its single release: "Already familiar from its radio play and already on The Singles Chart, it is shaping up as a major hit." New York Times critic John Rockwell said that it's "not Wonder's most compelling song, but nice that it should be so popular."

== Personnel ==
- Stevie Wonder - vocals, electric piano, percussion
- Raymond Maldonado - trumpet
- Steve Madaio - trumpet
- Raymond Pounds - drums
- Nathan Watts - bass guitar
- Michael Sembello - lead guitar
- Ben Bridges - rhythm guitar
- Hank Redd - alto saxophone
- Trevor Lawrence - tenor saxophone

== Charts ==
=== Weekly charts ===
Weekly chart performance for "Sir Duke"
Chart (1977–1978)	Peak position
Australia (Kent Music Report)	69
Austria (Ö3 Austria Top 40)	10
Belgium (Ultratop 50 Flanders)	22
Belgium (Ultratop 50 Wallonia)	24
Canada Top Singles (RPM)	1
Germany (GfK)	10
Netherlands (Single Top 100)	19
New Zealand (Recorded Music NZ)	24
Norway (VG-lista)	8
Switzerland (Schweizer Hitparade)	4
UK Singles (Official Charts)	2
US Billboard Hot 100	1
US Hot R&B/Hip-Hop Songs (Billboard)	1
US Billboard Adult Contemporary	3
US Dance Club Songs (Billboard)	2

Chart (2014)	Peak position
South Korea International (Circle)	72

=== Year-end charts ===
Year-end chart performance for "Sir Duke"
Chart (1977)	Rank
Canada	11
US Billboard Hot 100	18
US Billboard Adult Contemporary	43

== Certifications ==
Certifications for "Sir Duke"
Region	Certification	Certified units/sales
Canada (Music Canada)	Gold	75,000^{^}
New Zealand (RMNZ)	Platinum	30,000^{‡}
United Kingdom (BPI)	Platinum	600,000^{‡}
^{^} Shipments figures based on certification alone.^{‡} Sales+streaming figures based on certification alone.
