= Isn't She Lovely =

1976 promotional single by Stevie Wonder

- Motown CD single reissue (1996)

Promotional single by Stevie Wonder

from the album Songs in the Key of Life
- Released: 1976
- Recorded: 1975
- Genre: Soul
- Length: 6:33 (album version); 3:20 (radio version)
- Label: Tamla
- Songwriter: Stevie Wonder
- Producer: Stevie Wonder

Audio video
- "Isn't She Lovely" (album version) on YouTube

"Isn't She Lovely" is a song by Stevie Wonder from his 1976 album, Songs in the Key of Life. The lyrics celebrate the birth of his daughter, Aisha Morris. Wonder collaborated on the song with Harlem songwriter and studio owner Burnetta "Bunny" Jones.

== Background ==
The song opens side 3 of Songs in the Key of Life, and starts with a baby's first cry recorded during an actual childbirth. A recording of Wonder bathing Aisha as an older toddler is brought into the final section of the song, mixed with Wonder's extended chromatic harmonica solo. All of the instruments heard in the song are played by Wonder, except for some keyboard parts played by Greg Phillinganes. During the recording process, bassist Nathan Watts laid down a bass guitar line to serve as a guide track for Wonder, but Wonder eventually replaced this with his own keyboard bass performance.

The more-than-six-minute song was not released as a single, as Wonder was unwilling to shorten the song to fit the 7", 45 rpm format. Even without a single release, the song received so much airplay that it reached number 23 on the Adult Contemporary chart in January 1977. The radio version shortens the intro and much of the tail-end of the song with a fade out. Since then, the song has become a jazz and pop standard, covered by many artists. Wonder performed the song live for Queen Elizabeth II at her Diamond Jubilee Concert on June 4, 2012, with lyrics modified to refer to the Queen.

== Releases ==
The song was not issued as a commercial single and therefore it did not appear on the major charts in the US and UK. However, due to radio airplay, it reached number 23 on the Billboard Adult Contemporary chart (then known as the Easy Listening chart) on January 29, 1977.

== Personnel ==
- Stevie Wonder – vocals, harmonica, percussion, RMI Electra Piano, Fender Rhodes, bass synth, drums
- Greg Phillinganes – keyboards
- Aisha Morris – bathing, assorted babbling noises, muse
- Yolanda Simmons — talking in recording, mother of muse, bathing assistant

== Cover versions ==
- Joe Beck opens his 1983 trio album Relaxin' with the song
- English singer-songwriter David Parton released the song in 1976, which was a UK number 4 hit in early 1977. It spent nine weeks on the chart, and became the 54th biggest hit of the year. Parton's version gave him one-hit wonder status in the United Kingdom.
- Jazz guitarist Lee Ritenour included the song on his 1977 instrumental album Captain Fingers.
- Pianist/percussionist Victor Feldman recorded a jazz instrumental version for his 1977 album The Artful Dodger.
- Clarinetist and bandleader Woody Herman fronted a big band version in 1978 on the album Fatha Herman and his Thundering Herd.
- Saxophonist/arranger Bill Holman included the song on his 1987 album The Bill Holman Band.
- In November 2012, an acoustic version sung by Jimmy Higham and Jon Walmsley reached number 41 on the UK Singles Chart.
- In June 2026, a cover version sung by YouTuber JobbytheHong appeared in "Remember", the series finale for The Amazing Digital Circus, serving as a leitmotif for the character of Jax. Series creator Gooseworx provided the arrangement.

== Chart history ==
Year	Artist	IR	SA	UK	U.S. Billboard	
Year	Artist	IRMA	Springbok	Singles Chart	U.S. Hot 100	U.S. AC
1976	Stevie Wonder	—	—	94 (Note: The track reached #94 on the UK Singles Chart in June 2012, based on download sales)	—	23
1977	David Parton	3	—	4	105	—
1977	Leslie Kleinsmith	—	12	—	—	—
2012	Jimmy Higham & Jon Walmsley	—	—	41	—	—

Stevie Wonder

Chart (2010)	Peak position
South Korea International (Circle)	15

== Certifications ==
Region	Certification	Certified units/sales
Denmark (IFPI Danmark)	Gold	45,000^{‡}
New Zealand (RMNZ)	2× Platinum	60,000^{‡}
United Kingdom (BPI)	Platinum	600,000^{‡}
United States (RIAA)	Gold	500,000^{*}
^{*} Sales figures based on certification alone.^{‡} Sales+streaming figures based on certification alone.
