= Pastime Paradise =

1976 song performed by Stevie Wonder

Song by Stevie Wonder

from the album Songs in the Key of Life
- Released: 1976
- Genre: Funk
- Length: 3:27
- Label: Motown
- Songwriter: Stevie Wonder
- Producer: Stevie Wonder

Licensed audio
- "Pastime Paradise" on YouTube

"Pastime Paradise" is a song by American musician Stevie Wonder, recorded for his 1976 album Songs in the Key of Life.

The song was one of the first to use a synthesizer (the Yamaha GX-1) to sound like a full string section. Built initially from synth tracks rather than from a drummer setting the basic rhythm, the song is augmented with rhythm performances from Wonder, Ray Maldonado, and Bobbye Hall, and a persistent "chinging" bell pattern by Hare Krishna musicians. A gospel choir from West Angeles Church of God and a Hare Krishna chanting group culminate in a multicultural finale.

== Meaning and reception ==
Ian McCann, of the Financial Times, writes that "The song’s lyrics are not entirely coherent, but their meaning is plain: in the west, we enjoy endless distractions, but are we satisfied? Are we working for a better future in this world or the next?" Steve Lodder writes in his book Stevie Wonder: A Musical Guide to the Classic Albums that "listeners may understand the song in one of two ways. One way is the comparison and contrast of the difference between the negative attitude of someone with a flawed past, and the positive outlook of someone who wishes for a perfect future in this life or the next. The other way is a description of how selfish materialism and laziness cannot compare to a strong work ethic which brings the great reward of Heaven."

== Covers and sampling ==
Mary J. Blige's "Time", as well as Coolio's "Gangsta's Paradise" and its parody, "Amish Paradise" by "Weird Al" Yankovic, each sample or interpolate the song. Patti Smith, Chick Corea and Billy Mackenzie have recorded covers of the song. In 2004, the English boy band Blue built their song "Curtain Falls" around a repeating sample of "Pastime Paradise". IAM also sampled the song in "Tam Tam de l'Afrique" at the chorus. Ian McCann of the Financial Times says that Bob Marley's 1980 song "Pimper's Paradise" also takes inspiration from the song.

== See also ==
- Prelude and Fugue in C minor, BWV 847
