= David Parton =

English singer-songwriter and record producer

- Born: David Eric Stanley Parton; 1948 (age 77–78)
- Origin: Newcastle Under Lyme, Staffordshire, England
- Genres: Pop, Rock, R&B
- Instrument: Vocals

David Parton (born David Eric Stanley Parton, 1948) is an English singer-songwriter and record producer from Newcastle Under Lyme, Staffordshire, England. He is also known as Des Parton, based on the initials of his first three names.

== Career ==
Parton was the frontman of Strange Fox, who were nurtured by Tony Hatch in the early 1970s. Parton achieved songwriting success writing songs for Sweet Sensation in the mid-1970s, namely "Sad Sweet Dreamer" which was a number 1 single in the UK, and "Purely by Coincidence" which also charted. He arranged and co-produced both tracks with Tony Hatch and Jackie Trent.

In 1975, Parton released an album entitled Snaps on the Buk record label, a short lived imprint of Decca Records. A year later he re-emerged with a band called The Cyril Dagworth Players, where Parton masqueraded as Dagworth. They released one album, also co-produced by Parton and Hatch.

Parton then sang a cover version of Stevie Wonder's "Isn't She Lovely" which he again co-produced with Hatch. When the original contracted singer (Marcel King from Sweet Sensation) was unable to re-create Wonder's vocal nuances, rather than dispose of the backing track, Parton sang the lead vocal, and it was decided to issue this version. It was released in 1976 and charted in the UK Singles Chart in January 1977 for nine weeks, reaching number 4 (Stevie Wonder's original was not released as a single, but peaked at number 94 in the UK Singles Chart in 2012 based on downloads following his performance of the song at the Diamond Jubilee of Elizabeth II). Lack of further chart action saw Parton dubbed as a one-hit wonder. He later worked as a songwriter and producer based in Cheshire.

He has generally sung and played guitar with local bands from north Staffordshire.

== Songwriting credits ==
- "Sad Sweet Dreamer" – Sweet Sensation
- "Purely by Coincidence" – Sweet Sensation
- "Belinda" – Coup De Cœur

== Discography ==
=== Albums ===
- Snaps – Buk Records – 1975

All tracks written & arranged by Des Parton

1. "Lawman" – (5:36)
2. "Eyes as Sad as Yours" (4:20)
3. "All the Live Long Day" (4:48)
4. "Oh for the Glory" (5:53)
5. "Queenie" (4:14)
6. "Jane" (3:25)
7. "The Nigger's Coming" (2:48)
8. "Something for the Likes of You" (3:42)
9. "Longest Journey" (3:17)
10. "Vandal" (3:51)

=== Singles ===
Year	Title	UK	Certifications
1977	"Isn't She Lovely"	4	BPI: Silver
1977	"In Everything You Do"	—	
1978	"Let's Make This Dream Last Forever"	—	
"—" denotes releases that did not chart.
