= Sad Sweet Dreamer =

Single by Sweet Sensation

from the album Sad Sweet Dreamer
- B-side: "Surething, Yes I Do"
- Released: 1974
- Recorded: 1974
- Genre: Pop; soul
- Length: 3:10
- Label: Pye
- Songwriter: David Parton
- Producers: David Parton; Tony Hatch

Sweet Sensation singles chronology
"Sad Sweet Dreamer" (1974)	"Hide Away from the Sun" (1975)

"Sad Sweet Dreamer" is a song by Sweet Sensation, which was a number-one single on the UK Singles Chart for one week in October 1974.

The second single from the British soul group, a soaring soul ballad heavily influenced by the Stylistics (and led by lead vocalist Marcel King's falsetto), "Sad Sweet Dreamer" became their first hit. It was written by David Parton and co-produced by Tony Hatch and Parton. The song reached No. 14 on the U.S. Billboard Hot 100 the following spring. It charted similarly in Canada. Both Hatch and Jackie Trent sang on the track to augment Sweet Sensation. Hatch wanted to work with them after they were discovered on New Faces whilst he was on the judging panel. The song was covered by French singer Joe Dassin as "Carolina (Sad Sweet Dreamer)" in 1975.

The song can be heard in the 2009 UK television series Red Riding. It is also featured in the 2013 film Rush.

== Chart history ==
=== Weekly charts ===
Chart (1974–75)	Peak position
Australia KMR	24
Canada RPM Top Singles	10
Canada RPM Adult Contemporary	19
Ireland (IRMA)	3
South Africa	8
UK Singles Chart	1
U.S. Billboard Hot 100	14
U.S. Billboard Adult Contemporary	18
U.S. Cash Box Top 100	17

=== Year-end charts ===
Chart (1974)	Rank
UK	39

Chart (1975)	Rank
Canada	149
US (Joel Whitburn's Pop Annual)	132
