= Another Star =

- French single cover

Single by Stevie Wonder

from the album Songs in the Key of Life
- B-side: "Creepin'"
- Released: August 1977
- Genre: Disco
- Length: 8:28 (album version); 5:17 (single edit)
- Label: Tamla
- Songwriter: Stevie Wonder
- Producer: Stevie Wonder

Stevie Wonder singles chronology
"Sir Duke" (1977)	"Another Star" (1977)	"As" (1977)

"Another Star" is a song written and performed by Stevie Wonder from his 1976 album Songs in the Key of Life. It is the final track on side four of the double LP. The flute player Bobbi Humphrey appears in the last section of the song.

Released as a single in 1977, it reached number 32 on the Billboard Hot 100, number 29 Easy Listening, number 18 on the Black Singles chart, and number 2 on the Dance/Disco chart, also reaching number 51 in Canada and number 29 in the UK.

== Background ==
Cash Box said that "a foot-tapping, Latin-influenced rhythm and an unforgettable 'La la la' chorus are but two of the hooks that will take this record to the upper reaches of the pop and R&B charts." Record World said that "Wonder's venture into salsa also gives him a chance to stretch out vocally more than on past singles."

In Rolling Stone's original review of the album, Vince Aletti wrote that the song "bursts with an aching, tender passion that’s turned loose in the dense, danceable Brazilian-flavored production." Writing in Stylus Magazine, Mallory O'Donnell described it as "a joyous song about heartbreak."

== Personnel ==
Taken from album liner notes

- George Benson – guitar, background vocals
- Nathan Watts – bass
- Nathan Alford Jr. – percussion
- Carmello Hungria Garcia – timbales
- Trevor Lawrence – tenor saxophone
- Hank Redd – alto saxophone
- Raymond Maldonado – trumpet
- Steve Madaio – trumpet
- Bobbi Humphrey – flute
- Josie James – background vocals

== Chart performance ==
Chart (1977)	Peak position
Canada	51
UK Singles (Official Charts Company)	29
US Billboard Easy Listening	29
US Billboard Hot 100	32
US Billboard National Disco Action Top 40	2
US Billboard Hot Black Singles	18

== Cover versions ==
- The song was covered by Kathy Sledge, who released the song as a single. Sledge's version peaked at number fifty-four on the UK Singles Chart in 1995.
- Brazilian singer Salomé de Bahia released a dance version of the song with Portuguese lyrics in 1999.

== In popular culture ==
- The song featured as the theme tune to the BBC's TV coverage of the 2014 FIFA World Cup in Brazil.
