= Marshall Time Modulator =

Musical effects device

The Marshall Time Modulator is an analog delay line-based musical effects device created by Stephen St. Croix that could be used to produce a wide variety of flanging and chorus effects.

The device was heavily used by the record producer Martin Hannett, whom Paul Humphreys (of OMD) has said "used it on everything". Bands who worked with Hannett described it as the "Marshall Time Waster."
