= Thomas J. Martin =

American inventor and improved fire extinguisher patent holder

- Born: 1842; United States
- Died: Iowa, US
- Other name: Thomas J Marshall
- Known for: Invention of an improved fire extinguisher
- Spouse: Evaline Moore Kidd

Thomas J. Martin (1842–1872) was awarded a patent for improvement to the fire extinguisher in 1872. The invention involved the use of pipes to carry water upwards and valves in the ceiling acting as sprinklers to extinguish fires in buildings.

Thomas Jefferson Martin was born on 29 May 1842. Martin was wounded at the battle of Shiloh.

In 1868, Martin married Evaline Moore Kidd.

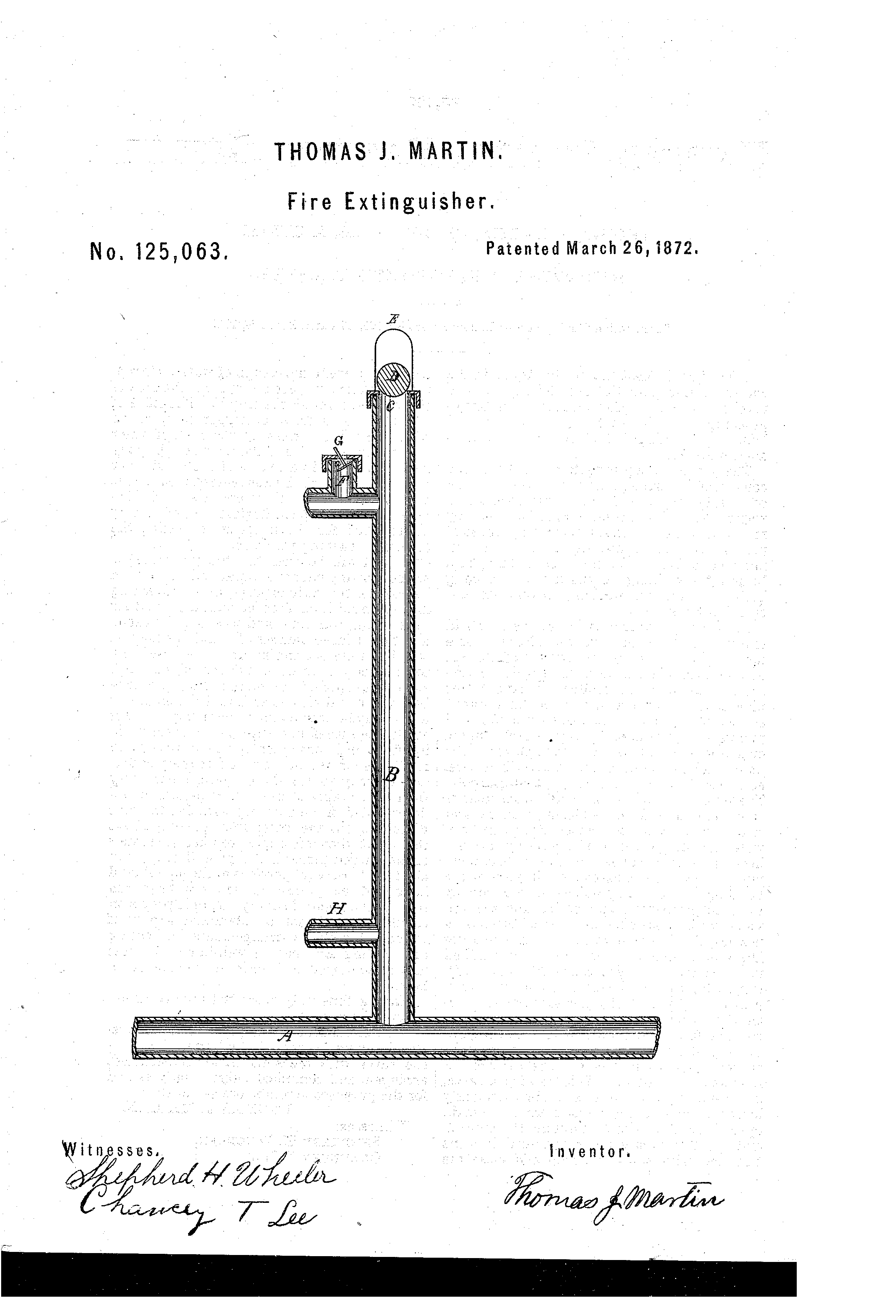
Diagram from Thomas J. Martin's fire extinguisher patent from 1872.

== Notes ==
In some sources, the name is given as Thomas Marshall including on Henry Baker's 1899 list.
